= Miss France Monde =

Beauty contest and title in France

Miss France Monde Miss Monde France
- Type: Beauty pageant
- Headquarters: Paris
- Country represented: France
- Qualifies for: Miss World
- First edition: 1951; 75 years ago
- Most recent edition: 2026
- Current titleholder: Indira Ampiot; Guadeloupe
- President & National Director: Frédéric Gilbert
- Franchise Owner/License Holder: Miss France
- Language: French
- Website: miss-france.fr

Miss France Monde or Miss Monde France (English: Miss France World or Miss World France) is a title that has been officially and unofficially conferred upon French representatives to Miss World since 1951. The franchise license holder to crown Miss France for the Miss World contest has varied throughout the years.

The most recent Miss France Monde is Indira Ampiot of Guadeloupe, who was crowned Miss France Monde 2026 on May 18, 2026.

== History ==
The official sash and title of Miss France Monde/Miss Monde France (Miss France World/Miss World France) first appeared in 1999 at the initiative of Michel Leparmentier, member and organizer of the historic Miss France Committee (also referred to as the Miss France Committee of Paris), with the election of Sandra Bretonès, now a television presenter and host, whose first runner-up was Karine Ferri, currently a presenter on TF1. Before then, the titleholders were mostly referred to as "Miss France" even if they had never won Miss France or participated in the pageant and had won a pageant/title from a competing organization and/or separate pageant. Between 1999 and 2003, five young women were therefore elected by the historic Miss France Committee (Miss France Committee of Paris) founded in 1954. After the 2003 edition of Miss World, the Miss France Committee of Geneviève de Fontenay (also referred to as the Miss France Company or the Miss France Organization) regained the license franchise after de Fontenay sold the pageant to Endemol France, which later became Endemol Shine France and is now Banijay France (the French branch of the Dutch television production company Endemol, later Endemol Shine, now Banijay), after outbidding the historic Miss France Committee of Paris for the Miss World license and has been the license holder/franchise owner since. From 2004 to 2025, they were also the license holder/franchise owner for Miss France Univers.

== Titleholders ==
Color key

- Winner
- Runner-Up
- Semifinalist
- Ended as a special awards winner but was unplaced
- Did not compete/Replaced/Dethroned

Year	Miss France Monde	Region Represented/Regional Title	Qualification Method	Placement at Miss World	Special Awards and Challenge Events
2026	Indira Ampiot	Miss Guadeloupe 2022	Miss France 2023	Top 12	Miss World Top Model (Winner overall and Winner for Europe); Miss World Beauty with a Purpose (Top 24 overall and Top 6 for Europe); Miss World Europe (1st Runner-Up)
2025	Agathe Cauet	Miss Nord-Pas-de-Calais 2022	1st Runner-Up at Miss France 2023	Unplaced	Head to Head Challenge (Top 20 overall and Top 5 for Europe); Miss World Multimedia (Top 20 overall and Top 5 for Europe); Miss World Sports (Top 32 overall and Top 8 for Europe)
2024	Indira Ampiot	Miss Guadeloupe 2022	Miss France 2023	No contest in 2024 due to the delays of the 2023 pageant and the decision to have the next edition be in 2025.	
2023	Clémence Botino	Miss Guadeloupe 2019	Miss France 2020	Top 40	Miss World Top Model (Top 20 overall and Top 5 for Europe)
2022	Clémence Botino	Miss Guadeloupe 2019	Miss France 2020	No contest in 2022 due to constant delays of this pageant along with the delay of the 2021 pageant.	
2021	April Benayoum	Miss Provence 2020	1st Runner-Up at Miss France 2021	Top 13	Miss World Top Model (Top 13 overall)
2020	Vaimalama Chaves	(French Polynesia) Miss Tahiti 2018	Miss France 2019	No contest in 2020 due to the COVID-19 pandemic.	
2019	Ophély Mézino	Miss Guadeloupe 2018	1st Runner-Up at Miss France 2019	1st Runner-Up; Miss World Europe	Miss World Beauty with a Purpose (Top 10); Miss World Sports & Fitness (Top 32); Miss World Top Model (3rd Runner-Up)
2019	Vaimalama Chaves	(French Polynesia) Miss Tahiti 2018	Miss France 2019	Withdrew and was replaced due to scheduling conflicts between Miss World 2019 and Miss France 2020. And also chose to accompany the contestants of Miss France 2020 to their trip to Tahiti rather than compete internationally, thus, also opting out of Miss Universe 2019 as well.	
2018	Maëva Coucke	Miss Nord-Pas-de-Calais 2017	Miss France 2018	Top 12	Head to Head Challenge (Top 20); Miss World Multimedia (Top 5); Miss World Top Model (Winner)
2017	Aurore Kichenin	Miss Languedoc-Roussillon 2016 (Languedoc)	1st Runner-Up at Miss France 2017	Top 5	Miss World Beauty with a Purpose (Top 20); Head to Head Challenge (Winner for Group 4); Miss World Top Model (Top 30)
2017	Alicia Aylies	Miss Guyane 2016 (Miss French Guiana 2016)	Miss France 2017	Withdrew and was replaced due to scheduling conflicts between Miss World 2017 and Miss Universe 2017.	
2016	Morgane Edvige	Miss Martinique 2015	1st Runner-Up at Miss France 2016	Top 20	Miss World Top Model (Top 5)
2016	Iris Mittenaere	Miss Nord-Pas-de-Calais 2015	Miss France 2016	Withdrew and was replaced due to scheduling conflicts between Miss World 2016 and Miss France 2017.	
2015	Hinarere Taputu	(French Polynesia) Miss Tahiti 2014	1st Runner-Up at Miss France 2015	Top 11	Miss World Interview (3rd Runner-Up); Miss World People's Choice Award (Top 5); Miss World Sports & Fitness (Top 24); Miss World Top Model (Top 5)
2015	Camille Cerf	Miss Nord-Pas-de-Calais 2014	Miss France 2015	Withdrew and was replaced due to scheduling conflicts between Miss World 2015 and Miss France 2016.	
2014	Flora Coquerel	Miss Orléanais 2013 (Centre/ Centre-Val de Loire)	Miss France 2014	Unplaced	Miss World Interview (Winner); Miss World People's Choice Award (Top 23); Miss World Top Model (Top 20); World Fashion Dress Design (Top 5)
2013	Marine Lorphelin	Miss Bourgogne 2012 (Miss Burgundy 2012)	Miss France 2013	1st Runner-Up; Miss World Europe	Miss World Beach Beauty (1st Runner-Up); Miss World Beauty with a Purpose (5th Runner-Up); Miss World Interview (Winner); Miss World Sports & Fitness (Top 20); Miss World Top Model (2nd Runner-Up); World Fashion Dress Design (Winner)
2012	Delphine Wespiser	Miss Alsace 2011	Miss France 2012	Unplaced	Miss World Interview (Top 20); Miss World Top Model (Top 57)
2011	Clémence Oleksy	Miss Auvergne 2010	2nd Runner-Up at Miss France 2011	Unplaced	Miss World Beach Beauty (Top 36); Miss World Beauty wit a Purpose (Top 77); Miss World Top Model (Top 20)
2010	Virginie Dechenaud	Miss Rhône-Alpes 2009	1st Runner-Up at Miss France 2010	Top 25	Miss World Beach Beauty (Top 20)
2009	Chloé Mortaud	Miss Albigeois Midi-Pyrénées 2008 ( Midi-Pyrénées)	Miss France 2009	3rd Runner-Up	Miss World Beach Beauty (3rd Runner-Up); Miss World Top Model (Top 12); World Fashion Designer Dress (Top 12)
2008	Laura Tanguy	Miss Pays de la Loire 2007	2nd Runner-Up at Miss France 2008	Unplaced	
2008	Valérie Bègue	Miss Réunion 2007	Miss France 2008	Barred from competing internationally at Miss World 2008 and Miss Universe 2008.	
2007	Rachel Legrain-Trapani	Miss Picardie 2006 (Miss Picardy 2006)	Miss France 2007	Unplaced	
2006	Laura Fasquel	Miss Albigeois Midi-Toulousain 2005 ( Midi-Pyrénées)	2nd Runner-Up at Miss France 2006	Unplaced	
2005	Cindy Fabre	Miss Normandie 2004 (Miss Normandy 2004)	Miss France 2005	Unplaced	
2004	Lætitia Marciniak	(County of Artois) (French Hainaut) Miss Artois-Hainaut 2003 ( Nord-Pas-de-Calais)	3rd Runner-Up at Miss France 2004	Unplaced	
2003	Virginie Dubois		Miss France Monde 2003	Unplaced	
2002	Caroline Chamorand	Miss Hauts-de-Seine 2001 ( Île-de-France) [historical Miss France Committee of Paris title]	Miss France Monde 2002	Unplaced	
2002	Sylvie Tellier	Miss Lyon 2001 ( Rhône-Alpes)	Miss France 2002	Withdrew in protest due to the contest being held in Nigeria because of the Amina Lawal incident.	
2001	Emmanuelle Chossat	Miss Franche-Comté 2000 (historical Miss France Committee of Paris title)	Miss France Monde 2001	Unplaced	
2000	Karine Meier	Miss Lorraine 1999 (historical Miss France Committee of Paris title)	Miss France Monde 2000	Unplaced	
1999	Sandra Benotès	Miss Nord-Pas-de-Calais 1998 (historical Miss France Committee of Paris title)	Miss France Monde 1999	Unplaced	
1998	Véronique Caloc	Miss Martinique 1997	1st Runner-Up at Miss France 1998	1st Runner-Up	
1998	Sophie Thalmann	Miss Lorraine 1997	Miss France 1998	Withdrew and was replaced due to scheduling conflicts between Miss World 1998 and Miss France 1999.	
1997	Laure Belleville	Miss Pays de Savoie 1995 (Rhône-Alpes)	Miss France 1996	Unplaced	
1996	Séverine Deroualle	(Duchy of Anjou) Miss Anjou 1995 (Pays de la Loire)	4th Runner-Up at Miss France 1996	Unplaced	
1995	Hélène Lantoine	Miss Flandre 1994 (Miss Flanders (French Flanders) 1994) [ Nord-Pas-de-Calais]	1st Runner-Up at Miss France 1995	Unplaced	
1994	Radiah Latidine	Miss Guyane 1993 (Miss French Guiana 1993)	2nd Runner-Up at Miss France 1994	Unplaced	
1993	Véronique de la Cruz	Miss Guadeloupe 1992	Miss France 1993	Top 10	
1992	Linda Hardy	Miss Pays de la Loire 1991	Miss France 1992	Unplaced	
1991	Mareva Georges	(French Polynesia) Miss Tahiti 1990	Miss France 1991	Top 10	
1990	Gaëlle Voiry	Miss Aquitaine 1989	Miss France 1990	Unplaced	
1989	Peggy Zlotkowski	Miss Aquitaine 1988	Miss France 1989	Unplaced	
1988	Claudia Frittolini	Miss Alsace 1987	1st Runner-Up at Miss France 1988	Unplaced	
1987	Nathalie Marquay	Miss Alsace 1986	Miss France 1987	6th Runner-Up	
1986	Catherine Carew	Miss Guadeloupe 1985	Miss Outre-Mer 1986 at Miss France 1986	Unplaced	
1985	Nathalie Jones	Miss Nouvelle-Calédonie 1984 (Miss New Caledonia 1984)	Miss Outre-Mer 1985 at Miss France 1985	Unplaced	
1984	Martine Robine	Miss Normandie 1983 (Miss Normandy 1983)	Miss France 1984	Unplaced	
1983	Frédérique Leroy	Miss Bordeaux 1982 ( Aquitaine)	1st Runner-Up at Miss France 1983 then Miss France 1983	Unplaced	
1982	Martine Philipps	Miss Franche-Comté 1981	1st Runner-Up at Miss France 1982	Unplaced	
1981	Isabelle Benard	Miss Normandie 1980 (Miss Normandy 1980)	Miss France 1981	Unplaced	
1980	Patricia Barzyk	(Jura (department)) Miss Jura 1979 ( Franche-Comté)	Miss France 1980	2nd Runner-Up	
1979	Sylvie Paréra	Miss Marseille 1978 ( Provence)	Miss France 1979	Unplaced	
1978	Kelly Hoarau	Miss Réunion 1977	1st Runner-Up at Miss France 1978	Unplaced	
1977	Véronique Fagot	Miss Poitou 1976 ( Poitou-Charentes)	Miss France 1977	Top 15	
1976	Monique Uldaric	Miss Réunion 1975	Miss France 1976	Unplaced	
1975	Sophie Perin	Miss Lorraine 1974	Miss France 1975	Unplaced	
1974	Edna Tepava	(French Polynesia) Miss Tahiti 1973	Miss France 1974	Unplaced	
1973	Isabelle Krumacker	Miss Lorraine 1972	Miss France 1973	Unplaced	
1972	Claudine Cassereau	Miss Poitou 1971 ( Poitou-Charentes)	3rd Runner-Up at Miss France 1972 then Miss France 1972	Unplaced	
1971	Myriam Stocco	Miss Languedoc-Roussillon 1970 (Languedoc)	Miss France 1971	6th Runner-Up	
1970	Michelle Beaurain	Miss Paris 1969 ( Île-de-France)	Miss France 1970	Unplaced	
1969	Suzanne Angly	Miss Alsace 1968	Miss France 1969	Top 15	
1968	Nelly Gallerne		1st Runner-Up at Miss Cinémonde 1968	Top 15	
1967	Carole Noe		1st Runner-Up at Miss Cinémonde 1967	Top 15	
1966	Michèle Boule	Miss Cannes 1965 [ (County of Nice) Côte d’Azur (French Riviera)]	Miss France 1966	Top 15	
1965	Christiane Sibellin	Miss Lyon 1964 ( Rhône-Alpes)	Miss France 1965	Top 16	
1964	Jacqueline Gayraud	Miss Vendée 1963 ( Pays de la Loire)	Miss France 1964	Top 16	
1963	Muguette Fabris	Miss Île-de-France 1962	Miss France 1963	5th Runner-Up	
1962	Monique Lemaire	(Côtes-d'Armor) Miss Côte d'Émeraude 1961 (Miss Emerald Coast 1961) [ Bretagne (Brittany)]	Miss France 1962	2nd Runner-Up	
1961	Michèle Wargnier	Miss Bretagne 1960 (Miss Brittany 1960)	Miss France 1961	3rd Runner-Up	
1960	Diane Medina	Paris (Île-de-France)) [Competed through the French Committee of Elegance which organized their own Miss France pageant with Mademoiselle France]	Mademoiselle France 1960	Top 15	
1960	Yolanda Biecosai	(Competed through the French Committee of Elegance which organized their own Miss France pageant with Mademoiselle France)	Mademoiselle France 1960	Withdrew and was Replaced	
1959	Marie Hélène Trové	(Competed through the French Committee of Elegance which organized their own Miss France pageant with Mademoiselle France)	Mademoiselle France 1959	Unplaced	
1958	Claudine Auger	Paris (Île-de-France)	Miss Cinémonde 1957	1st Runner-Up	
1957	Claude Inès Navarro	Miss French Algeria 1957		5th Runner-Up	
1956	Geneviève Solare	Paris (Île-de-France) [Competed through the French Committee of Elegance which organized their own Miss France pageant with Mademoiselle France]	Mademoiselle France 1956	Unplaced	
1955	Gisèle Thierry	Paris (Île-de-France) [Competed through the French Committee of Elegance which organized their own Miss France pageant with Mademoiselle France]	Mademoiselle France 1955	5th Runner-Up	
1954	Claudine Bleuse	Miss Provence 1954 [Title through the French Committee of Elegance which organized their own Miss France pageant with Mademoiselle France]	2nd Runner-Up at Mademoiselle France 1954	3rd Runner-Up	
1954	Monique Lambert	(County of Nice) Miss Côte d’Azur 1954 (Miss French Riviera 1954) [Title through the French Committee of Elegance which organized their own Miss France pageant with Mademoiselle France]	Mademoiselle France 1954	Withdrew and was Replaced	
1953	Denise Perrier	(Saint-Raphaël, Var) Miss Saint-Raphaël 1953 (Note: Denise Perrier had won Miss Saint-Raphaël 1953 as her regional title for Mademoiselle France 1953 due to winning the title while on vacation in the French Riviera. Perrier is originally from Ambérieu-en-Bugey in Ain, Rhône-Alpes.) ( (County of Nice) Côte d’Azur/French Riviera) [Title through the French Committee of Elegance which organized their own Miss France pageant with Mademoiselle France]	Mademoiselle France 1953	Miss World 1953	
1952	Nicole Drouin	(County of Nice) Miss Côte d’Azur 1950 (Miss French Riviera 1950)	Miss France 1951	5th Runner-Up	
1951	Jacqueline Lemoine	Paris (Île-de-France)	Miss Bikini France 1951	3rd Runner-Up	
