= Miss France Univers =

Beauty contest and title in France

Miss Universe France
- Type: Beauty pageant
- Headquarters: Paris
- Country represented: France
- Qualifies for: Miss Universe
- First edition: 1952; 74 years ago
- Most recent edition: 2026
- Current titleholder: Garance Authié; Île-de-France
- President: Inés Ligron
- Franchise Owner/License Holder: Miss Universe via Miss Universe France
- Language: French

Miss France Univers or Miss Univers France (English: Miss France Universe or Miss Universe France) is a title that has been officially and unofficially conferred upon French representatives to Miss Universe since 1952. The franchise license holder to crown Miss France for the Miss Universe contest has varied throughout the years.

The most recent Miss France Univers is Garance Authié of Île-de-France, who was crowned Miss France Univers 2026 on 18 October 2026.

== History ==
The early years of the title (and exceptionally afterwards), the ladies representing France at Miss Universe were not from the Miss France Committee and held the title of Miss Cinémonde (named after the French film magazine), most of them were actresses before or after their election. Claude Godard was the very first French woman to compete in Miss Universe at the first edition of the competition in 1952.

Initially, only the young woman holding the title of Miss France obtained the right to compete in Miss Europe and the two main international beauty pageants, namely Miss Universe and Miss World. However, following an internal decision by the Miss France organization, or due to scheduling conflicts between the two events, it is common and permitted for the runners-up of Miss France to participate in one of the two world pageants or Miss Europe. In 1963, Monique Lemaire was the first Miss Universe participant from the Miss France Committee/Miss France Company (then chaired by Louis Poirot/Louis de Fontenay, Geneviève de Fontenay's partner). Marie-Thérèse Tullio, 2nd Runner-Up of Miss France 1965, was the very first runner-up in a national pageant to represent the country at Miss Universe in 1965.

In 1986, while Valérie Pascale was Miss France, Catherine Carew was Miss Overseas at Miss France for that year and was appointed to represent France at Miss Universe and Miss World that year in place of Pascale. A similar decision happened the previous year, with the Miss Overseas at that Miss France contest with Nathalie Jones representing France at Miss World 1985. On 11 May 2001, Élodie Gossuin placed in the top 10 of the Miss Universe 2001 pageant in Bayamón, Puerto Rico, despite rumors questioning whether or not she was actually a woman, which turned out to be false when it was determined that she was actually a woman.

The official sash and title of Miss France Univers/Miss Univers France (Miss France Universe/Miss Universe France) first appeared in 2003 at the initiative of Michel Leparmentier, member and organizer of the historic Miss France Committee (also referred to as the Miss France Committee of Paris), with the appointing of Emmanuelle Chossat as representative for France at Miss Universe 2003. Before then, the titleholders were mostly referred to as "Miss France" even if they had never won Miss France or participated in the pageant and had won a pageant/title from a competing organization and/or separate pageant. In 2003, one young woman was therefore elected by the historic Miss France Committee (Miss France Committee of Paris) founded in 1954. After the 2003 edition of Miss Universe, the Miss France Committee of Geneviève de Fontenay (also referred to as the Miss France Company or the Miss France Organization) regained the license franchise after de Fontenay sold the pageant to Endemol France, which later became Endemol Shine France and is now Banijay France (the French branch of the Dutch television production company Endemol, later Endemol Shine, now Banijay), after outbidding the historic Miss France Committee of Paris for the Miss Universe license and has been the main license holder/franchise owner since.

Two Miss France and Miss Universe France winners were national directors of the Miss France Company: Sylvie Tellier from 2007 to 2022 and Cindy Fabre from 2022 to 2025. Sylvie Tellier also served as a French translator and commentator several times on the Miss Universe election for the French airing of the pageant on Paris Première and Cindy Fabre also held the titles of Miss France Monde and Miss France Europe.

On 28 May 2026, the Miss France Company, on behalf of its president Frédéric Gilbert, announced via a press release its withdrawal from the Miss Universe contest, following the controversies that occurred during the 2025 edition and the questionable outcome of the contest. The last French woman representing France from an external committee was Emmanuelle Chossat, in 2003. Due to the withdrawal of the Miss France Company, the Miss Universe Organization announced that it will directly organize a selection process to choose France's representative for Miss Universe 2026 with Miss Univers France 2026.

France has sent the following to the Miss Universe competition:

- 58 candidates from the Miss France contest by the Miss France Company (1963, 1965-1967, 1971-2002, 2004-2025)
- 16 from an external committee (1952-1962, 1964, 1968-1970, 2003)
- 1 from the Miss Universe Organization (2026)

France and Canada are the only countries to have participated in every edition of Miss Universe. The United States, the home country of the pageant and its headquarters, only missed out on this feat due to the disqualification of Miss USA 1957 at Miss Universe 1957.

To date, two French women have won the Miss Universe crown:

- Christiane Martel, Miss Universe 1953
- Iris Mittenaere, Miss Universe 2016.

== Titleholders ==
Color key

- Declared as the Winner
- Ended as Runner-Up or Top 5
- Ended as Semifinalist
- Ended as a special awards winner but was unplaced
- Did not compete/Replaced/Dethroned

Year	Miss Universe France	Region Represented/Regional Title	Qualification Method	Placement at Miss Universe	Special Awards
2026	Garance Authié	Île-de-France; Appointed without regional and national pageants (Miss Universe title through selection directly from Miss Universe.)	Miss Univers France 2026	TBD	
2026	Angélique Angarni-Filopon	Miss Martinique 2024	Miss France 2025	Withdrawal from the Miss France Company due to the controversial outcome of the previous contest.	
2025	Ève Gilles	Miss Nord-Pas-de-Calais 2023	Miss France 2024	Top 30	
2024	Indira Ampiot	Miss Guadeloupe 2022	Miss France 2023	Top 30	
2023	Diane Leyre	Miss Île-de-France 2021	Miss France 2022	Unplaced	
2022	Floriane Bascou	Miss Martinique 2021	1st Runner-Up at Miss France 2022	Unplaced	
2022	Diane Leyre	Miss Île-de-France 2021	Miss France 2022	Reallocated to the 2023 edition due to lack of time for preparation available for this edition which prompeted Diane Leyre to opt out of competing. Was allowed to compete the following year.	
2021	Clémence Botino	Miss Guadeloupe 2019	Miss France 2020	Top 10	
2021	Amandine Petit	Miss Normandie 2020 (Miss Normandy 2020)	Miss France 2021	Reallocated to the 2020 edition due to scheduling conflicts between Miss Universe 2021 and Miss France 2022.	
2020	Amandine Petit	Miss Normandie 2020 (Miss Normandy 2020)	Miss France 2021	Top 21	
2020	Clémence Botino	Miss Guadeloupe 2019	Miss France 2020	Reallocated to the 2021 edition due to Miss France wanting to make sure that Amandine Petit could compete at Miss Universe without running into scheduling conflicts.	
2019	Maëva Coucke	Miss Nord-Pas-de-Calais 2017	Miss France 2018	Top 10	
2019	Vaimalama Chaves	(French Polynesia) Miss Tahiti 2018	Miss France 2019	Chose to accompany the contestants of Miss France 2020 to their trip to Tahiti rather than compete internationally, thus, opting out of Miss Universe 2019. Also could not compete at Miss World 2019 due to scheduling conflicts between Miss World 2019 and Miss France 2020 along with her preparation for the pageant.	
2018	Eva Colas	Miss Corse 2017 (Miss Corsica 2017)	1st Runner-Up at Miss France 2018	Unplaced	
2018	Maëva Coucke	Miss Nord-Pas-de-Calais 2017	Miss France 2018	Withdrew and was replaced due to scheduling conflicts between Miss World 2018 and Miss Universe 2018.	
2017	Alicia Aylies	Miss Guyane 2016 (Miss French Guiana 2016)	Miss France 2017	Unplaced	
2016	Iris Mittenaere	Miss Nord-Pas-de-Calais 2015	Miss France 2016	Miss Universe 2016	
2015	Flora Coquerel	Miss Orléanais 2013 (Centre/ Centre-Val de Loire)	Miss France 2014	Top 5 (3rd Runner-Up)	
2015	Camille Cerf	Miss Nord-Pas-de-Calais 2014	Miss France 2015	Reallocated to the 2014 edition due to scheduling conflicts between Miss Universe 2015 and Miss France 2016.	
2014	Camille Cerf	Miss Nord-Pas-de-Calais 2014	Miss France 2015	Top 15	
2014	Flora Coquerel	Miss Orléanais 2013 (Centre/ Centre-Val de Loire)	Miss France 2014	Reallocated to the 2015 edition due to Miss France wanting to make sure that Camille Cerf could compete at Miss Universe without running into scheduling conflicts.	
2013	Hinarani de Longeaux	(French Polynesia) Miss Tahiti 2012	1st Runner-Up at Miss France 2013	Unplaced	
2013	Marine Lorphelin	Miss Bourgogne 2012 (Miss Burgundy 2012)	Miss France 2013	Withdrew and was Replaced	
2012	Marie Payet	Miss Réunion 2011	2nd Runner-Up at Miss France 2012	Top 10 (6th Runner-Up)	
2012	Delphine Wespiser	Miss Alsace 2011	Miss France 2012	Withdrew and was replaced due to scheduling conflicts between Miss Universe 2012 and Miss France 2013.	
2011	Laury Thilleman	Miss Bretagne 2010 (Miss Brittany 2010)	Miss France 2011	Top 10 (6th Runner-Up)	
2010	Malika Ménard	Miss Normandie 2009 (Miss Normandy 2009)	Miss France 2010	Top 15	
2009	Chloé Mortaud	Miss Albigeois Midi-Pyrénées 2008 ( Midi-Pyrénées)	Miss France 2009	Top 10 (5th Runner-Up)	
2008	Laura Tanguy	Miss Pays de la Loire 2007	2nd Runner-Up at Miss France 2008	Unplaced	
2008	Valérie Bègue	Miss Réunion 2007	Miss France 2008	Barred from competing internationally at Miss World 2008 and Miss Universe 2008.	
2007	Rachel Legrain-Trapani	Miss Picardie 2006 (Miss Picardy 2006)	Miss France 2007	Unplaced	
2006	Alexandra Rosenfeld	(Languedoc-Roussillon) Miss Languedoc 2005	Miss France 2006	Unplaced	
2005	Cindy Fabre	Miss Normandie 2004 (Miss Normandy 2004)	Miss France 2005	Unplaced	
2004	Lætitia Bléger	Miss Alsace 2003	Miss France 2004	Unplaced	
2003	Emmanuelle Chossat	Franche-Comté; Appointed without regional and national pageants (historical Miss France Committee of Paris title)	Miss France Univers 2003	Unplaced	
2002	Sylvie Tellier	Miss Lyon 2001 ( Rhône-Alpes)	Miss France 2002	Unplaced	
2001	Élodie Gossuin	Miss Picardie 2000 (Miss Picardy 2000)	Miss France 2001	Top 10	
2000	Sonia Rolland	Miss Bourgogne 1999 (Miss Burgundy 1999)	Miss France 2000	Top 10	
1999	Mareva Galanter	(French Polynesia) Miss Tahiti 1998	Miss France 1999	Unplaced	
1998	Sophie Thalmann	Miss Lorraine 1997	Miss France 1998	Unplaced	
1997	Patricia Spehar	Miss Paris 1996 ( Île-de-France)	Miss France 1997	Unplaced	
1996	Laure Belleville	Miss Pays de Savoie 1995 ( Rhône-Alpes)	Miss France 1996	Unplaced	
1995	Corine Lauret	Miss Réunion 1994	2nd Runner-Up at Miss France 1995	Unplaced	
1994	Valérie Claisse	Miss Pays de la Loire 1993	Miss France 1994	Unplaced	
1993	Véronique de la Cruz	Miss Guadeloupe 1992	Miss France 1993	Unplaced	
1992	Linda Hardy	Miss Pays de la Loire 1991	Miss France 1992	Unplaced	
1991	Mareva Georges	(French Polynesia) Miss Tahiti 1990	Miss France 1991	Top 10	
1990	Gaëlle Voiry	Miss Aquitaine 1989	Miss France 1990	Unplaced	
1989	Pascale Meotti	Miss Franche-Comté 1988	3rd Runner-Up at Miss France 1989	Unplaced	
1988	Claudia Frittolini	Miss Alsace 1987	1st Runner-Up at Miss France 1988	Unplaced	
1987	Nathalie Marquay	Miss Alsace 1986	Miss France 1987	Unplaced	
1986	Catherine Carew	Miss Guadeloupe 1985	Miss Outre-Mer 1986 at Miss France 1986	Unplaced	
1985	Suzanne Iskandar	Miss Alsace 1984	Miss France 1985	Unplaced	
1984	Martine Robine	Miss Normandie 1983 (Miss Normandy 1983)	Miss France 1984	Unplaced	
1983	Frédérique Leroy	Miss Bordeaux 1982 ( Aquitaine)	1st Runner-Up at Miss France 1983 then Miss France 1983	Unplaced	
1982	Martine Philipps	Miss Franche-Comté 1981	1st Runner-Up at Miss France 1982	Unplaced	
1981	Isabelle Benard	Miss Normandie 1980 (Miss Normandy 1980)	Miss France 1981	Unplaced	
1980	Brigitte Choquet	Miss Roussillon 1979	Unplaced at Miss France 1980	Unplaced	
1979	Sylvie Paréra	Miss Marseille 1978 ( Provence)	Miss France 1979	Unplaced	
1978	Brigitte Konjovic	Miss Paris 1977 ( Île-de-France)	1st Runner-Up at Miss France 1978 then Miss France 1978	Unplaced	
1977	Véronique Fagot	Miss Poitou 1976 ( Poitou-Charentes)	Miss France 1977	Unplaced	
1976	Monique Uldaric	Miss Réunion 1975	Miss France 1976	Unplaced	
1975	Sophie Perin	Miss Lorraine 1974	Miss France 1975	Unplaced	
1974	Brigitte Flayac	Miss Arcachon 1973 ( Aquitaine)	5th Runner-Up at Miss France 1974	Unplaced	
1973	Isabelle Krumacker	Miss Lorraine 1972	Miss France 1973	Unplaced	
1972	Claudine Cassereau	Miss Poitou 1971 ( Poitou-Charentes)	3rd Runner-Up at Miss France 1972 then Miss France 1972	Unplaced	
1971	Myriam Stocco	Miss Languedoc-Roussillon 1970 (Languedoc)	Miss France 1971	Top 12	
1970	Françoise Durand-Behot		Exterior Committee	Unplaced	
1969	Agathe Cognet	Paris (Île-de-France)	Miss Cinémonde 1969	Unplaced	
1968	Elizabeth Cadren	Paris (Île-de-France)	Miss Cinémonde 1968	Top 15	
1967	Anne Vernier	Miss Aquitaine 1966	1st Runner-Up at Miss France 1967	Unplaced	
1966	Michèle Boule	Miss Cannes 1965 [ (County of Nice) Côte d’Azur (French Riviera)]	Miss France 1966	Unplaced	
1965	Marie-Thérèse Tullio	Miss Marseille 1964 ( Provence)	2nd Runner-Up at Miss France 1965	Unplaced	
1964	Edith Noël		Exterior Committee	Top 10	
1963	Monique Lemaire	(Côtes-d'Armor) Miss Côte d'Émeraude 1961 (Miss Emerald Coast 1961) [ Bretagne (Brittany)]	Miss France 1962	Top 15	
1962	Sabine Surget		Exterior Committee	Unplaced	
1961	Simone Darot		Exterior Committee	Top 15	
1960	Florence Anne Marie Normand Eyrie		Miss Cinémonde 1960	Unplaced	
1959	Françoise Saint-Laurent		Miss Cinémonde 1959	Top 15	
1958	Monique Boulinguez		Miss Cinémonde 1958	Unplaced	
1957	Lisa Simon		Miss Cinémonde 1957	Unplaced	
1956	Anita Treyens		Miss Cinémonde 1956	Top 15	
1955	Claudie Petit		Miss Cinémonde 1955	Unplaced	
1954	Jacqueline Beer		Miss Cinémonde 1954	Top 16	
1953	Christiane Martel		Miss Cinémonde 1953	Miss Universe 1953	
1952	Claude Godard		Exterior Committee	Unplaced	
