= Virginie Dechenaud =

French beauty pageant titleholder

- Born: 7 January 1986 (age 40); Grenoble, France
- Education: Grenoble School of Management
- Height: 1.74 m (5 ft 8 1/2 in)
- Beauty pageant titleholder
- Title: Miss Rhône-Alpes 2009; Miss World France 2010
- Major competitions: Miss France 2010 (1st Runner-Up); Miss World 2010 (Top 25)

Virginie Dechenaud (born 7 January 1986) is a French model and beauty pageant titleholder who held the title of Miss World France 2010. She had previously won Miss Rhône-Alpes 2009 and placed as the first runner-up at Miss France 2010, leading to her appointment as Miss World France. Dechenaud represented France at Miss World 2010, where she placed in the top 25.

== Life and career ==
Dechenaud was born on 7 January 1986 in Grenoble and raised in the town of La Frette in the Isère department. She graduated with a master's degree in marketing from the Grenoble School of Management in 2010.

=== Pageantry ===
In 2008, Dechenaud competed for the Miss Dauphiné 2008 pageant, where she placed as the second runner-up. This qualified her for the Miss Rhône-Alpes 2008 pageant, where she placed as the fourth runner-up. She returned to Miss Rhône-Alpes the following year, where she won the title. As Miss Rhône-Alpes, Dechenaud represented the region at the Miss France 2010 pageant in Nice. She advanced into the top 12 and the top five, where she eventually placed as the first runner-up to Malika Ménard of Normandy. After Miss France, Dechenaud was appointed Miss World France 2010 by the Miss France Company and represented the country at the Miss World 2010 pageant in Sanya. She ultimately finished in the top 25.

In 2011, Dechenaud began working as a communications officer for the Isère department. In 2024, she joined the Miss Rhône-Alpes Committee as a co-regional director alongside Thierry Mazars of the Miss Languedoc Committee In 2026, she became the sole regional director of the Miss Rhône-Alpes Committee.

Awards and achievements
Preceded by Chloé Mortaud	Miss World France; 2010	Succeeded by Clémence Oleksy
Preceded by Armonie Jenton	Miss Rhône-Alpes; 2009	Succeeded by Elisa Charbonnier
