= Miss Rhône-Alpes =

French beauty pageant

- Type: Beauty pageant
- Headquarters: Rhône-Alpes, France
- Members: Miss France
- Official language: French
- Regional director: Virginie Dechenaud

Miss Rhône-Alpes is a French beauty pageant which selects a representative for the Miss France national competition from the region of Rhône-Alpes. Women representing the region under various different titles have competed at Miss France since 1928, although the Miss Rhône-Alpes title was not used regularly until 1987.

The current Miss Rhône-Alpes is Julia Grid-Costantino, who was crowned Miss Rhône-Alpes 2025 on 19 September 2025. Seven women from Rhône-Alpes have gone on to win Miss France.

- Yvette Labrousse, who was crowned Miss France 1930, competing as Miss Lyon
- Sylvie-Rosine Numez, who was crowned Miss France 1957, competing as Miss Saint-Étienne
- Christiane Sibellin, who was crowned Miss France 1965, competing as Miss Lyon
- Christiane Lillio, who was crowned Miss France 1968, competing as Miss Saint-Étienne
- Sylvie Bertin, who was crowned Miss France 1988, competing as Miss Pays d'Ain
- Laure Belleville, who was crowned Miss France 1996, competing as Miss Pays de Savoie
- Sylvie Tellier, who was crowned Miss France 2002, competing as Miss Lyon

== Results summary ==
- Miss France: Yvette Labrousse (1929; Miss Lyon); Sylvie-Rosine Numez (1956; Miss Saint-Étienne); Christiane Sibellin (1964; Miss Lyon); Christiane Lillio (1967; Miss Saint-Étienne); Sylvie Bertin (1987; Miss Pays d'Ain); Laure Belleville (1995; Miss Pays de Savoie); Sylvie Tellier (2001; Miss Lyon)
- 1st Runner-Up: Sophie Hernandez (1984; Miss Lyon); Isabelle Vitry (1991; Miss Savoie); Virginie Dechenaud (2009)
- 2nd Runner-Up: Michèle Dumonteil (1961)
- 3rd Runner-Up: Ariane Quatrefages (1999); Nawal Benhlal (2000; Miss Lyon); Fanny Anselme (2002)
- 4th Runner-Up: Valérie Chouvet (1991; Miss Saint-Étienne Pays du Forez); Virginie Gaudenèche (2005; Miss Pays d'Ain)
- 5th Runner-Up: Florence Lefranc (1977); Delphine Brossard (1996); Florence Jacquinot (1997; Miss Pays d'Ain); Cloé Biessy (2007); Julie Jacquot (2012)
- 6th Runner-Up: Nadia Dumont (1993; Miss Pays de Savoie); Armonie Jenton (2008)
- Top 12/Top 15: Marie-Pierre Damarin (1988); Sandrine Gaudin (1989); Rachel Detain (1989; Miss Pays d'Ain); Annabelle Excoffon (1990); Christelle Abry (1992; Miss Lyon); Nagège Pichol-Thievend (1992; Miss Savoie); Tiphaine Coulot (1994; Miss Pays de Savoie); Daphnée Delarche (1999; Miss Lyon); Tiphaine Guerineau (2000; Miss Pays d'Ain); Leslie Rouzier (2004; Miss Dauphiné); Émilie Arrault (2006); Edwige Tiare (2009; Miss Pays de Savoie); Nora Bengrine (2015); Dalida Benaoudia (2017); Anaïs Roux (2020); Charlotte Faure (2021); Esther Coutin (2022)

== Gallery ==
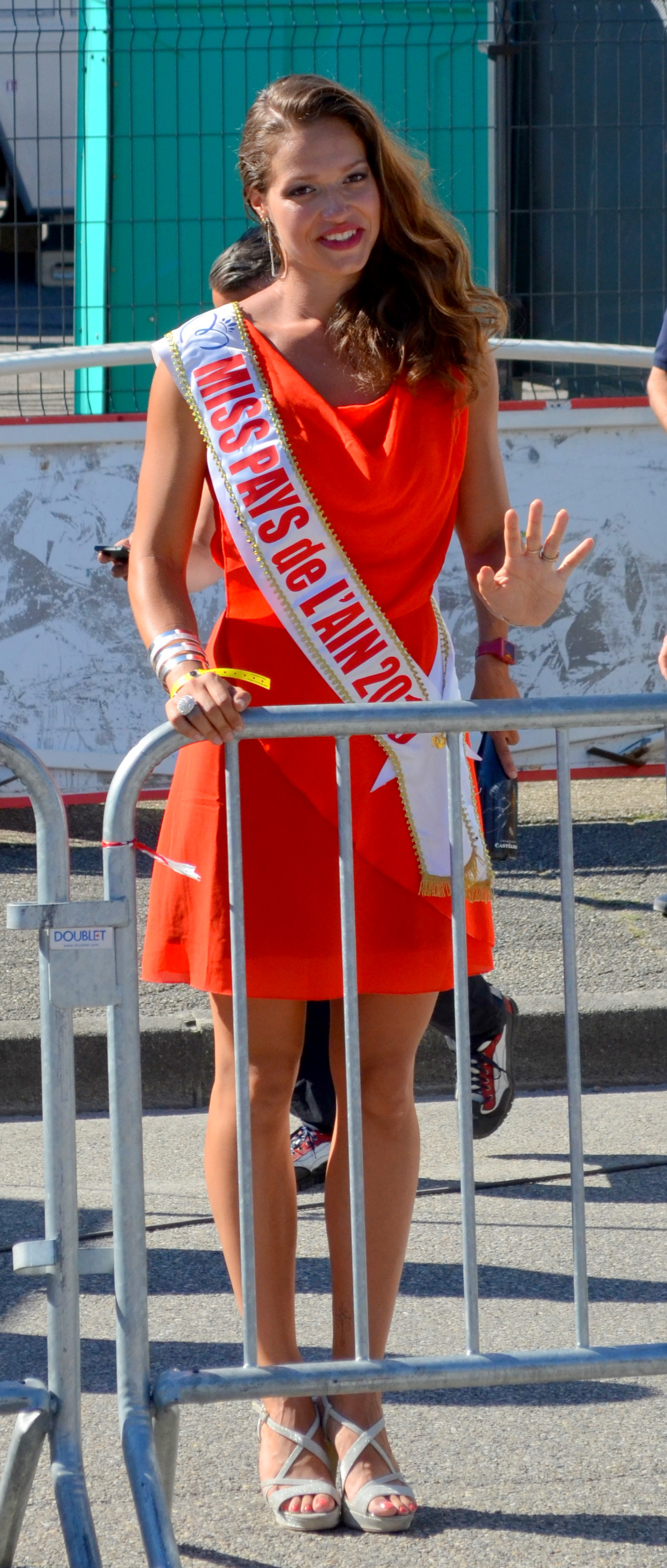
Miss Rhône-Alpes 2016
Camille Bernard

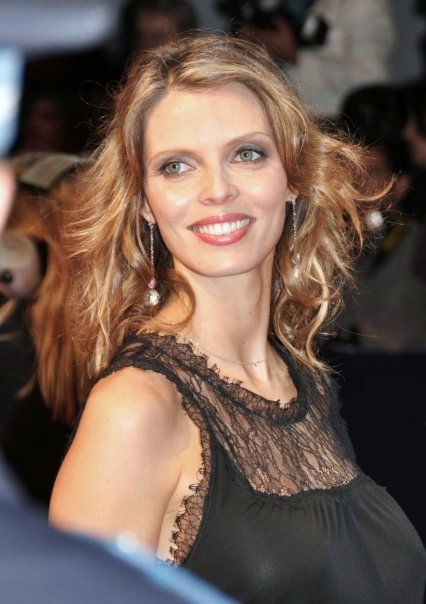
Miss Lyon 2001 and Miss France 2002
Sylvie Tellier

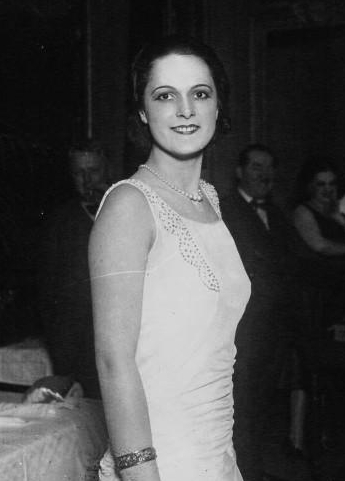
Miss Lyon 1929 and Miss France 1930
Yvette Labrousse

== Titleholders ==
Year	Name	Age (Note: Ages at the time of Miss France)	Height	Hometown	Miss France placement	Notes
2026	Julia Grid-Costantino	23	1.74 m (5 ft 8 1/2 in)	Lyon	TBD	
2025	Noémie Baiamonte	21	1.70 m (5 ft 7 in)	Replonges		
2024	Alexcia Couly	22	1.72 m (5 ft 7 1/2 in)	Villeurbanne	Top 15	
2023	Alizée Bidaut	22	1.74 m (5 ft 8 1/2 in)	Saint-Genis-sur-Menthon		
2022	Esther Coutin	24	1.71 m (5 ft 7 1/2 in)	Passy	Top 15	
2021	Charlotte Faure	20	1.72 m (5 ft 7 1/2 in)	Biviers	Top 15	
2020	Anaïs Roux	23	1.73 m (5 ft 8 in)	Lyon	Top 15	
2019	Chloé Prost	20	1.78 m (5 ft 10 in)	Légny		
2018	Pauline Ianiro	19	1.79 m (5 ft 10 1/2 in)	Saint-Denis-lès-Bourg		
2017	Dalida Benaoudia	24	1.78 m (5 ft 10 in)	Lyon	Top 12	
2016	Camille Bernard	20	1.78 m (5 ft 10 in)	Grenoble		
2015	Nora Bengrine	20	1.72 m (5 ft 7 1/2 in)	Saint-Martin-d'Hères	Top 12	
2014	Aurore Thibaud	20	1.73 m (5 ft 8 in)	Fontaine		
2013	Mylène Angelier	22	1.77 m (5 ft 9 1/2 in)	Sarcey		
2012	Julie Jacquot	24	1.72 m (5 ft 7 1/2 in)	Lyon	Top 12 (5th Runner-Up)	
2011	Cindy Saroul	20	1.73 m (5 ft 8 in)	Valence		
2010	Elisa Charbonnier	21	1.76 m (5 ft 9 1/2 in)	Châtillon-sur-Chalaronne		
2009	Virginie Dechenaud	23	1.74 m (5 ft 8 1/2 in)	La Frette	1st Runner-Up	Top 25 at Miss World 2010
2008	Armonie Jenton	18	1.74 m (5 ft 8 1/2 in)	Viriat	Top 12 (6th Runner-Up)	
2007	Cloé Biessy	19	1.74 m (5 ft 8 1/2 in)	Prévessin-Moëns	Top 12 (5th Runner-Up)	
2006	Émilie Arrault	24	1.75 m (5 ft 9 in)	Saint-Symphorien-d'Ozon	Top 12	
2003	Audrey Vignon			Amplepuis		
2002	Fanny Anselme			Oullins	3rd Runner-Up	
2001	Mélanie Georges			Septème		
2000	Lætitia Sauzet			Villeneuve		
1999	Ariane Quatrefages	22	1.72 m (5 ft 7 1/2 in)	Villette-d'Anthon	3rd Runner-Up	
1998	Laure Chalançon	20	1.73 m (5 ft 8 in)			
1997	Stéphanie Loricourt	19	1.76 m (5 ft 9 1/2 in)	Saint-Laurent-de-Mure		
1996	Delphine Brossard				Top 12 (5th Runner-Up)	
1995	Karine Rouvière					
1994	Angélique Correia					
1992	Laurence Benguigui					
1991	Sabine Alotte					
1990	Annabelle Excoffon		1.80 m (5 ft 11 in)	Voiron	Top 12	
1989	Sandrine Gaudin				Top 12	
1988	Marie-Pierre Damarin				Top 12	
1987	Catherine Sontag					
1985	Karin Brun					
1977	Florence Lefranc				5th Runner-Up	Competed as Miss Alpes
1961	Michèle Dumonteil				2nd Runner-Up	

=== Miss Dauphiné ===
In 1985, 1993, and from 2004 to 2006, the departments of Drôme and Isère competed separately as Miss Dauphiné.

Year	Name	Age	Height	Hometown	Miss France placement	Notes
2006	Lauriane Jaud	19	1.75 m (5 ft 9 in)	Montélimar		
2005	Maud Tordjman	19	1.74 m (5 ft 8 1/2 in)	Valence		
2004	Leslie Rouzier	22	1.84 m (6 ft 1/2 in)	Grenoble	Top 12	
1993	Laure Dumousseau					
1985	Rachelle Lizzi					

=== Miss Haute-Savoie ===
In 1976, 1986, 1987, and 1989, the department of Haute-Savoie crowned its own representative for Miss France. In 1978 and 1979, the title Miss Léman was used instead, while in 1977, the title Miss Léman-Haute-Savoie was used.

Year	Name	Age	Height	Hometown	Miss France placement	Notes
1989	Daphné Dasse					
1987	Nathalie Aubert					
1986	Valérie Brudieu					
1979	Marielle Burquier					
1978	Marie-Laure Harroch					
1977	Martine Bonnaz					
1976	Christine Charrière					

=== Miss Isère ===
In 1970, the department of Isère crowned its own representative for Miss France.

Year	Name	Age	Height	Hometown	Miss France placement	Notes
1970	Marie-Claude Court					

=== Miss Loire-Forez ===
From 1998 to 2009, the department of Loire competed separately as Miss Loire-Forez. Various titles were used to represent the department in the 1990s, including Miss Saint-Étienne, Miss Saint-Étienne Pays du Forez, Miss Nouvelle-Loire, and Miss Saint-Étienne Loire.

Year	Name	Age	Height	Hometown	Miss France placement	Notes
2009	Marion Léoncini	23	1.78 m (5 ft 10 in)	Montbrison		
2008	Lauriane Perez	20	1.72 m (5 ft 7 1/2 in)	Saint-Étienne		
2007	Laura Varillon	18	1.78 m (5 ft 10 in)	Saint-Chamond		
2005	Célia Clémancon	24	1.75 m (5 ft 9 in)	Saint-Chamond		
2004	Karine Guerit	21	1.74 m (5 ft 8 1/2 in)	Saint-Étienne		
2003	Sophie Blanchard			Saint-Étienne		
2002	Émilie Eymard					
2001	Aurélie Brun					
2000	Alexandra Mellinas			Montbrison		
1999	Stéphanie Gros	23	1.81 m (5 ft 11 1/2 in)			
1998	Sandy Dahléry	21	1.75 m (5 ft 9 in)			
1997	Aline Wangler	18	1.81 m (5 ft 11 1/2 in)			
1996	Christelle Arcis					
1995	Karine Plazzer			Saint-Étienne		
1994	Karine Fort					
1993	Grazielle Condelo	18				
1992	Maud Mahuet					
1991	Valérie Chouvet				4th Runner-Up	
1990	Sandrine Karmoussi					
1967	Christiane Lillio	17		Saint-Étienne	Miss France 1968	
1956	Sylvie-Rosine Numez			Saint-Étienne	Miss France 1957	

=== Miss Lyon ===
In 1928, 1929, 1964, and from the 1970s to 2000s, the Lyon Metropolis and department of Rhône competed separately under various titles, such as Miss Lyon, Miss Grand Lyon, and Miss Lyonnais.

Year	Name	Age	Height	Hometown	Miss France placement	Notes
2005	Roxanne Roblot-Bouvier	19	1.78 m (5 ft 10 in)	Meyzieu		
2004	Alexandra Lemarchand	23	1.80 m (5 ft 11 in)	Toussieu		
2003	Stéphanie Augris			Lyon		
2002	Marie Comte			Lyon		
2001	Sylvie Tellier	24	1.72 m (5 ft 7 1/2 in)	Lyon	Miss France 2002	Competed at Miss Universe 2002 National director of the Miss France Committee (2007–2022)
2000	Nawal Benhlal			Lyon	3rd Runner-Up	Competed at Miss International 2001
1999	Daphnée Delarche	19	1.74 m (5 ft 8 1/2 in)	Lyon	Top 12	
1998	Hélène Néron-Bancel	22	1.75 m (5 ft 9 in)	Lyon		
1997	Séverine Plasse	22	1.72 m (5 ft 7 1/2 in)	Lyon		
1996	Angélique Sage			Lyon		
1995	Frédérique Collin			Lyon		
1994	Marie-Caroline Berthet	19				
1993	Nathalie Didelot					
1992	Christelle Abry	23		Lyon	Top 12	
1991	Stéphanie Serano					
1990	Katia Petryk					
1986	Valérie Ollagnier					
1985	Annie Lafay					
1984	Sophie Hernandez				1st Runner-Up	
1979	Magali Vouilloz					
1978	Jocelyne Mercier					
1976	Michèle Pouzol					
1964	Christiane Sibellin	16		Lyon	Miss France 1965	Top 16 at Miss World 1965
1929	Yvette Labrousse	22		Oullins	Miss France 1930	
1928	Eugénie Argoud					

=== Miss Pays d'Ain ===
In 1979, 1985, and from 1988 to 2005, the department of Ain competed separately under the title Miss Pays d'Ain. In 1986 and 1987, the title Miss Bresse Bugey was used instead, while in 1970, the title Miss Bugey was used.

Year	Name	Age	Height	Hometown	Miss France placement	Notes
2005	Virginie Gaudenèche	25	1.72 m (5 ft 7 1/2 in)	Reyrieux	4th Runner-Up	
2004	Chrystelle Caton	23	1.73 m (5 ft 8 in)	Misérieux		
2003	Aurélie Julien			Chatillon-sur-Chalaronne		
2002	Madeline Cabanon					
2001	Patricia Recanati					
2000	Tiphaine Guerineau			Ferney-Voltaire	Top 12	
1999	Alexia Darnis	20	1.72 m (5 ft 7 1/2 in)			
1998	Clotilde Badré	19	1.71 m (5 ft 7 1/2 in)			
1997	Florence Jacquinot	20	1.77 m (5 ft 9 1/2 in)	Bellegarde-sur-Valserine	Top 12 (5th Runner-Up)	
1996	Carine Boireau					
1995	Stéphanie Pouchoy					
1994	Sophie Grenard					
1993	Nathalie Levrat	24				
1992	Marina Richaud	18				
1991	Stéphanie Vallée					
1990	Virginie Guillermin					
1989	Rachel Detain				Top 12	
1988	Cécile Crouzet					
1987	Sylvie Bertin	21		Ferney-Voltaire	Miss France 1988	
1986	Catherine Hecquet					
1985	Sandrine Maisson					
1979	Martine Mercier					
1970	Roselyne Rivière					

=== Miss Pays de Savoie ===
From 1993 to 2014, the departments of Savoie and Haute-Savoie competed separately under the title Miss Pays de Savoie.

Year	Name	Age	Height	Hometown	Miss France placement	Notes
2014	Aurore Péron	18	1.76 m (5 ft 9 1/2 in)	Saint-Jean-de-Maurienne		
2013	Julie Legros	22	1.70 m (5 ft 7 in)	Aiton		
2012	Graziella Byhet	24	1.77 m (5 ft 9 1/2 in)	Veyrier-du-Lac		
2011	Valentine Borel-Hoffmann	18	1.80 m (5 ft 11 in)	Annecy		
2010	Marion Guichard	22	1.76 m (5 ft 9 1/2 in)	Saint-Alban-Leysse		
2009	Edwige Tiare	22	1.77 m (5 ft 9 1/2 in)	Albertville	Top 12	
2008	Wendy Gex	19	1.80 m (5 ft 11 in)	Ville-la-Grand		
2007	Sonia Guillet	24	1.77 m (5 ft 9 1/2 in)	Cruet		
2006	Charlotte Viandaz	18	1.74 m (5 ft 8 1/2 in)	Meythet		
2005	Nouara Slimani	21	1.83 m (6 ft 0 in)	Thônes		
2004	Stéphany Delva	20	1.77 m (5 ft 9 1/2 in)	Valleiry		
2003	Clémentine Fitaire					
2002	Élodie Bordignon			Chambéry		
2001	Anne-Valérie Michellier			Onnion		
2000	Caroline Plan	21	1.73 m (5 ft 8 in)			
1999	Nathalie Jacquier	22	1.70 m (5 ft 7 in)			
1998	Christine Lavaut	18	1.78 m (5 ft 10 in)			
1997	Virginie Torre					
1996	Séverine Martin					
1995	Laure Belleville	19	1.73 m (5 ft 8 in)	Lathuile	Miss France 1996	Competed at Miss Universe 1996 Competed at Miss World 1997
1994	Tiphaine Coulot			Les Contamines-Montjoie	Top 12	
1993	Nadia Dumont				Top 12 (6th Runner-Up)	

=== Miss Savoie ===
In 1986, from 1976 to 1979, and from 1990 to 1992, the department of Savoie crowned its own representative for Miss France.

Year	Name	Age	Height	Hometown	Miss France placement	Notes
1992	Nagège Pichol-Thievend				Top 12	
1991	Isabelle Vitry				1st Runner-Up	
1990	Karine Michel					
1986	Véronique Loschi					
1979	Brigitte Barbin					
1978	Brigitte Vanin					
1977	Brigitte Perez					
1976	Nicole Basset					
