= University of French Guiana =

Public university in French Guiana

Coordinates: 4.9320°N 52.3019°W

- Université de Guyane
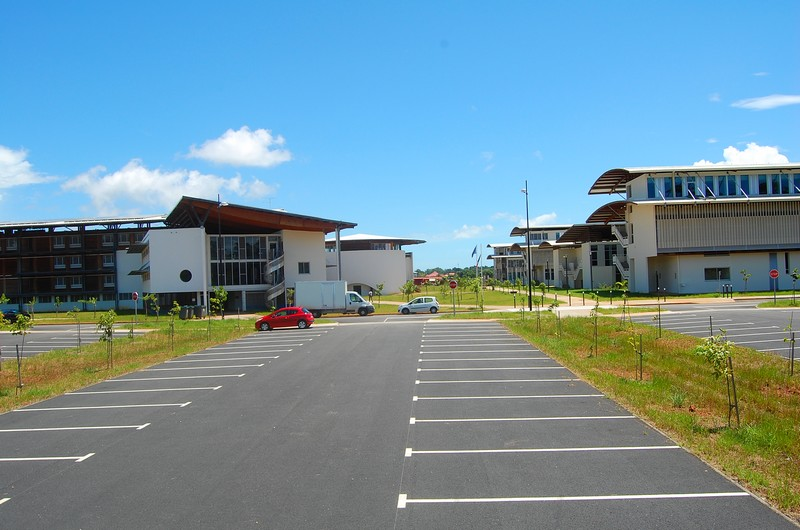
- Type: Public university
- Established: 30 July 2014
- President: Antoine Primerose
- Students: 2.034
- Location: Cayenne, France
- Website: www.univ-guyane.fr

The University of French Guiana (French: Université de Guyane) is a French public university, created in 2014 in French Guiana. It was formed from two existing campuses of the University of the French West Indies and Guiana.

== History ==
A conflict over funding for French Guiana relative to West Indian students led to a strike paralyzing the university for more than a month during the 2013–2014 academic year, with faculty, staff and students calling for independence. An agreement to end the conflict was signed on 11 November 2013.

The new University of French Guiana was created by decree, published July 30, 2014.

== Notable people ==
- Alicia Aylies (born 1998), Miss France 2017

== See also ==
- University of the French West Indies
