= Miss Martinique =

French beauty pageant

- Type: Beauty pageant
- Headquarters: Martinique, France
- Members: Miss France
- Official language: French
- Regional director: Flora Renault

Miss Martinique is a French beauty pageant which selects a representative for the Miss France national competition from the overseas region of Martinique. The first Miss Martinique was crowned in 1977, while the pageant has been organized regularly since 1984.

The current Miss Martinique is Maureen-Alycia Lucea-Merlin, who was crowned Miss Martinique 2026 on 13 June 2026.

== Results summary ==
- Miss France: Angélique Angarni-Filopon (2025)
- 1st Runner-Up: Véronique Caloc (1997); Morgane Edvige (2015); Floriane Bascou (2021)
- 2nd Runner-Up: Elsa Victoire (1987)
- 3rd Runner-Up: Camille René (2012); Axelle René (2022)
- 5th Runner-Up: Brigitte Matrol (1985); Murielle-Justine Jobello (1994); Charlène Civault (2011)
- 6th Runner-Up: Vanessa Aimée (2006); Anaïs Corosine (2010)
- Top 12/Top 15: Flora Renault (2003); Laure-Anaïs Abidal (2017)

== Gallery ==
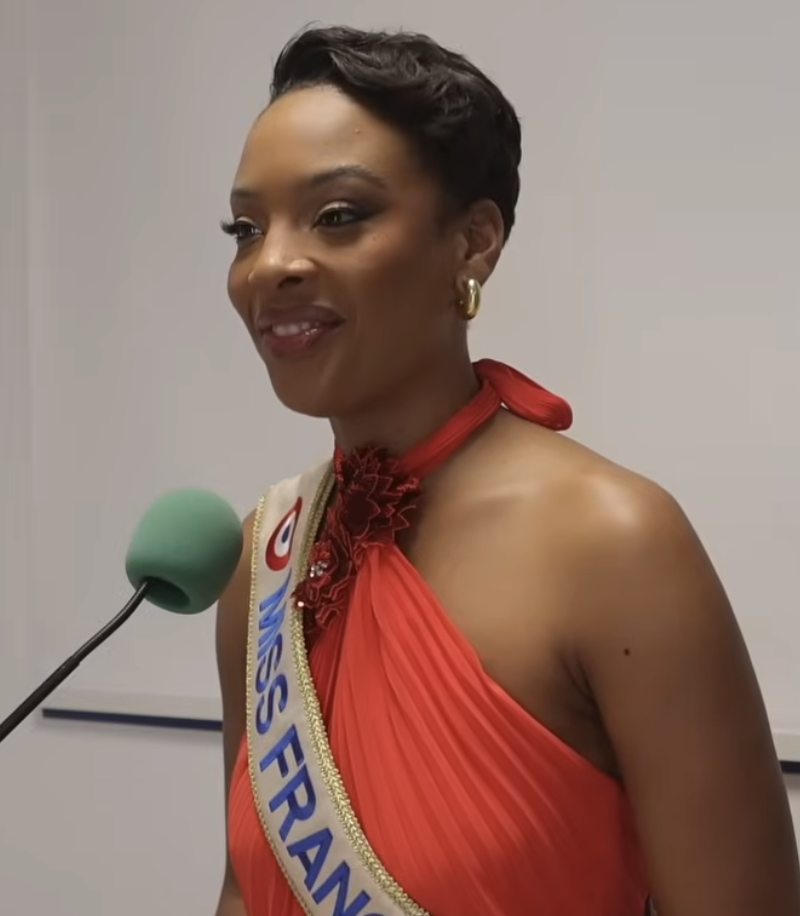
Miss Martinique 2024 and Miss France 2025
Angélique Angarni-Filopon

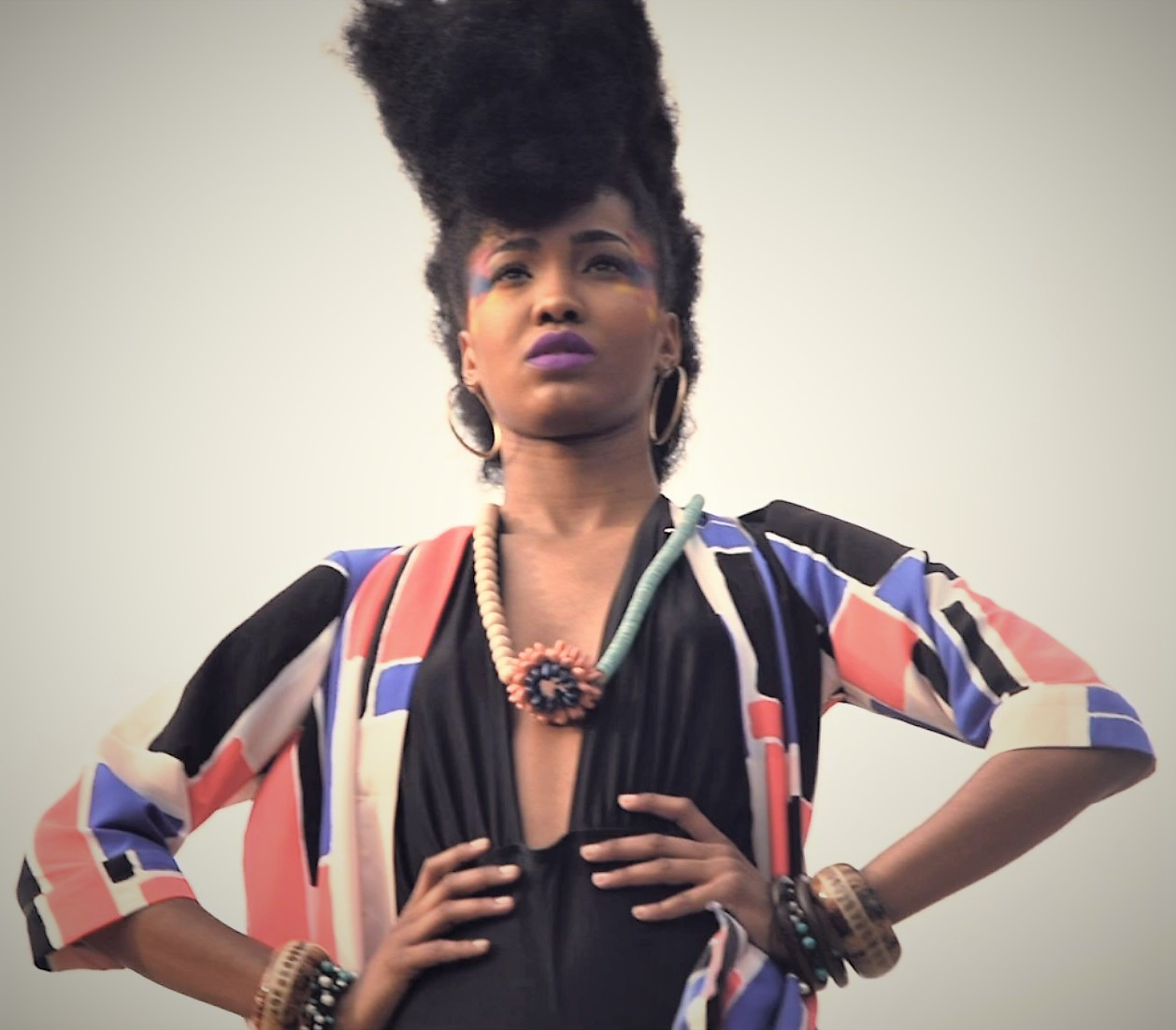
Miss Martinique 2015
Morgane Edvige

== Titleholders ==
Year	Name	Age (Note: Ages at the time of Miss France)	Height	Hometown	Miss France placement	Notes
2026	Maureen-Alycia Lucea-Merlin	24	1.76 m (5 ft 9 1/2 in)	Fort-de-France	TBD	
2025	Léaline Patry	21	1.70 m (5 ft 7 in)	Le François		
2024	Angélique Angarni-Filopon	34	1.83 m (6 ft 0 in)	Fort-de-France	Miss France 2025	
2023	Chléo Modestine	21	1.75 m (5 ft 9 in)	Le Vauclin		
2022	Axelle René	21	1.77 m (5 ft 9 1/2 in)	Le Robert	3rd Runner-Up	Top 40 at Miss World 2023 (representing Martinique) Top 22 at Miss Grand International 2025 (representing Martinique)
2021	Floriane Bascou	19	1.71 m (5 ft 7 1/2 in)	Le Lamentin	1st Runner-Up	Competed at Miss Universe 2022 (representing France)
2020	Séphorah Azur	23	1.78 m (5 ft 10 in)	Schœlcher		
2019	Ambre Bozza	21	1.77 m (5 ft 9 1/2 in)	Sainte-Luce		
2018	Olivia Luscap	18	1.77 m (5 ft 9 1/2 in)	Le Robert		
2017	Jade Voltigeur	18	1.75 m (5 ft 9 in)	Fort-de-France	Did not compete	Voltigeur was disqualified from competing in Miss France after she was deemed to have a tattoo that was too large in size. She was permitted to keep her title, but was replaced by Abidal, her first runner-up, as Martinique's representative at Miss France.
2017	Laure-Anaïs Abidal	21	1.75 m (5 ft 9 in)	Fort-de-France	Top 12	Voltigeur was disqualified from competing in Miss France after she was deemed to have a tattoo that was too large in size. She was permitted to keep her title, but was replaced by Abidal, her first runner-up, as Martinique's representative at Miss France.
2016	Aurélie Joachim	18	1.79 m (5 ft 10 1/2 in)	Ducos		3rd Runner-Up at Miss World 2025 (representing Martinique)
2015	Morgane Edvige	19	1.78 m (5 ft 10 in)	Le François	1st Runner-Up	Top 20 at Miss World 2016 (representing France)
2014	Moëra Michalon	19	1.70 m (5 ft 7 in)	Le Marigot		
2013	Nathalie Frédal	19	1.75 m (5 ft 9 in)	Gros-Morne		
2012	Camille René	18	1.76 m (5 ft 9 1/2 in)	Le Lamentin	3rd Runner-Up	Competed at Miss Supranational 2013 (representing France)
2011	Charlène Civault	23	1.83 m (6 ft 0 in)	Fort-de-France	Top 12 (5th Runner-Up)	
2010	Anaïs Corosine	23	1.75 m (5 ft 9 in)	Le Lamentin	Top 12 (6th Runner-Up)	
2009	Cindy Chénière	20	1.73 m (5 ft 8 in)	Le François		
2008	Laura Fidi	18	1.77 m (5 ft 9 1/2 in)	Fort-de-France		
2007	Bianca Careto	19	1.70 m (5 ft 7 in)	Schœlcher		
2006	Vanessa Aimée	20	1.75 m (5 ft 9 in)	Fort-de-France	Top 12 (6th Runner-Up)	
2005	Christine Nemorin	22	1.75 m (5 ft 9 in)	Fort-de-France		
2004	Lydia Martial	19	1.77 m (5 ft 9 1/2 in)			
2003	Flora Renault			Fort-de-France	Top 12	
2002	Séverine Cyrille					
2001	Florence Jean-Louis					
2000	Peggy Chény			Schœlcher		
1999	Axelle Negouai-Isaac	20	1.73 m (5 ft 8 in)			
1998	Louisiane Pellan	21	1.77 m (5 ft 9 1/2 in)			
1997	Véronique Caloc	22	1.85 m (6 ft 1 in)	Fort-de-France	1st Runner-Up	1st Runner-Up at Miss World 1998 (representing France)
1995	Valérie-Betty Villeronce					
1994	Murielle-Justine Jobello				Top 12 (5th Runner-Up)	
1993	Valérie Pierrode				Did not compete	
1992	Christelle Marie-Luce	22				
1991	Sandrine Jox			Fort-de-France		
1990	Pascale Louiset					
1988	Martine Timard					
1987	Elsa Victoire				2nd Runner-Up	6th Runner-Up at Miss Wonderland 1988 (representing France)
1986	Guylaine Fonsat					
1985	Brigitte Matrol				5th Runner-Up	
1984	Marie-Line Babot					
1979	Jocelyne Pigeonneau					
1977	Murielle Péloponèse					
