= Garance Authié =

French beauty pageant titleholder

- Education: IE University; London Business School
- Beauty pageant titleholder
- Title: Miss Universe France 2026
- Major competitions: Miss Universe France 2026; (Winner); Miss Universe 2026; (TBD)

Garance Authié is a French beauty pageant titleholder who was crowned Miss Universe France 2026. She will represent France at the Miss Universe 2026 in Puerto Rico.

== Early life and education ==
Garance Authié is from Paris, Île-de-France, France. She completed her secondary education (Baccalauréat) with honors (mention) at the age of 17.

== Pageantry ==
=== Miss Universe France 2026 ===
Authié competed in the Miss Universe France 2026, which marked the inaugural edition following the separation of Miss France from Miss Universe. She successfully reached the top 3 alongside Mareva Michel and Lilou Emeline-Artuso.

At the final night, held on October 18, 2026, at the Pullman Hotel in Paris, Authié won the crown.

=== Miss Universe 2026 ===
Authié will represent her country at Miss Universe 2026, which will be held in November 2026 in Puerto Rico.

Awards and achievements
Preceded by Eve Gilles (Nord-Pas-de-Calais)	Miss France Universe; 2026	Incumbent
