= Miss French Guiana =

Beauty contest

- Type: Beauty pageant
- Headquarters: French Guiana, France
- Members: Miss France
- Official language: French
- Regional director: Nouh Chaia Vernet

Miss French Guiana (French: Miss Guyane) is a French beauty pageant which selects a representative for the Miss France national competition from the overseas region of French Guiana. The first Miss French Guiana was crowned in 1960, while the first Miss French Guiana to compete in Miss France was crowned in 1987. The regional competition has been held regularly since 1998.

The current Miss French Guiana is Sandra Justine, who was crowned Miss French Guiana 2026 on 11 July 2026. One woman from French Guiana has been crowned Miss France:

- Alicia Aylies, who was crowned Miss France 2017

== Results summary ==
- Miss France: Alicia Aylies (2016)
- 1st Runner-Up: Audrey Ho-Wen-Tsaï (2023)
- 2nd Runner-Up: Radiah Latidine (1993)
- Top 12/Top 15: Marie-Josée Nallamoutou-Sancho (1988); Nathalie Mathurin (1995); Sabrina Louis (1998); Céline Claire-Eugénie (2004); Mandy Nicolas (2007); Tineffa Naisso (2009); Anaële Veilleur (2011); Ruth Briquet (2017); Mélysa Stephenson (2021)

== Gallery ==
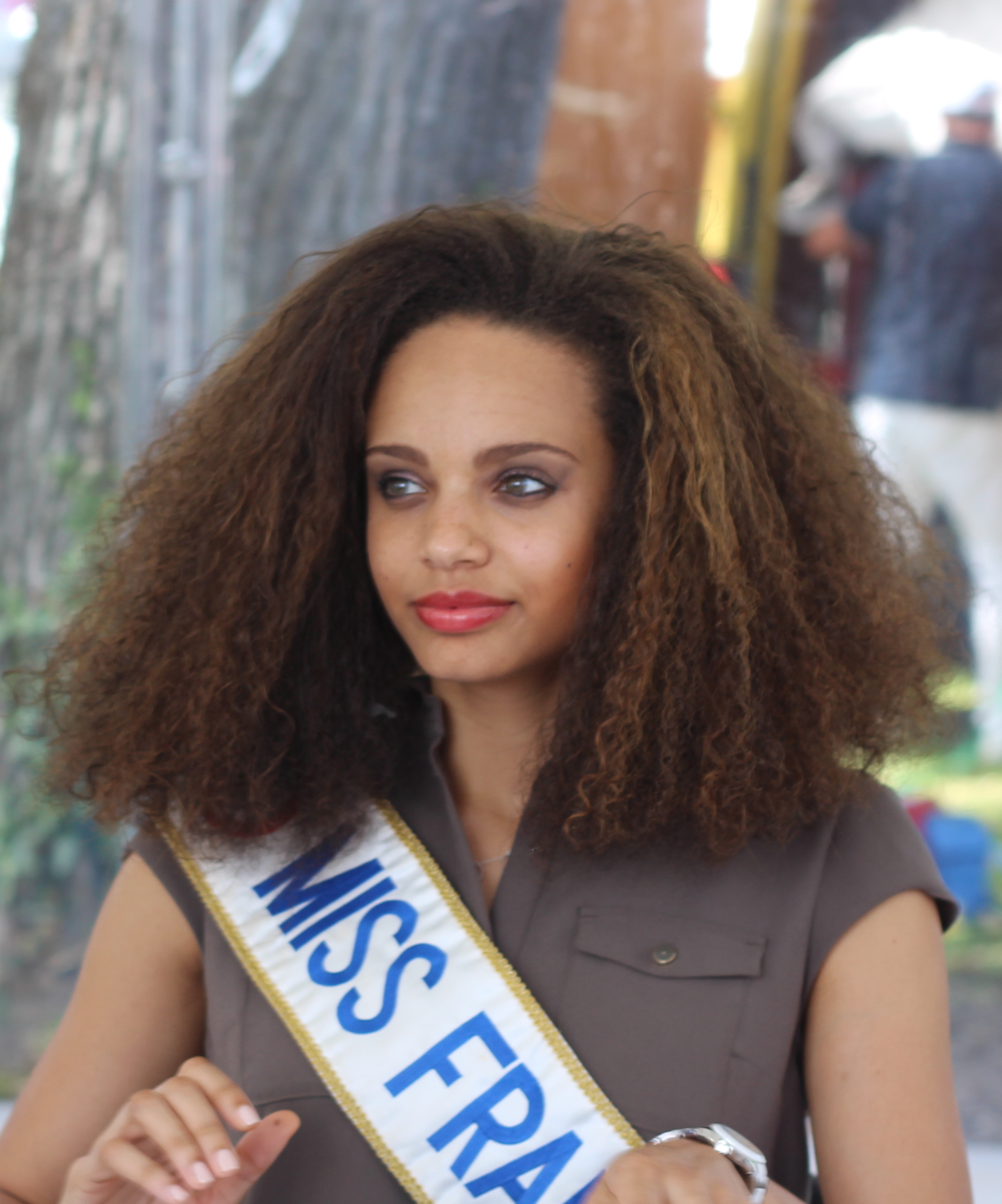
Miss French Guiana 2016 and Miss France 2017
Alicia Aylies

== Titleholders ==
Year	Name	Age (Note: Ages at the time of Miss France)	Height	Hometown	Miss France placement	Notes
2026	Sandra Justine	23	1.77 m (5 ft 9 1/2 in)	Kourou	TBD	
2025	Alicia Mertosetiko	20	1.72 m (5 ft 7 1/2 in)	Remire-Montjoly		
2024	Jade Fansonna	22	1.74 m (5 ft 8 1/2 in)	Matoury		
2023	Audrey Ho-Wen-Tsaï	18	1.73 m (5 ft 8 in)	Kourou	1st Runner-Up	Top 40 at Miss World 2026 (representing French Guiana)
2022	Shaïna Robin	21	1.74 m (5 ft 8 1/2 in)	Kourou		
2021	Mélysa Stephenson	19	1.71 m (5 ft 7 1/2 in)	Remire-Montjoly	Top 15	
2020	Héléneschka Horth	23	1.73 m (5 ft 8 in)	Awala-Yalimapo		
2019	Dariana Abé	21	1.74 m (5 ft 8 1/2 in)	Apatou		
2018	Laureline Decocq	19	1.76 m (5 ft 9 1/2 in)	Remire-Montjoly		
2017	Ruth Briquet	24	1.73 m (5 ft 8 in)	Cayenne	Top 12	
2016	Alicia Aylies	18	1.77 m (5 ft 9 1/2 in)	Matoury	Miss France 2017	Competed at Miss Universe 2017 (representing France)
2015	Estelle Merlin	21	1.83 m (6 ft 0 in)	Cayenne		
2014	Valéria Coelho Maciel	19	1.71 m (5 ft 7 1/2 in)	Kourou		
2013	Henriette Groneveltd	21	1.75 m (5 ft 9 in)	Remire-Montjoly		
2012	Corinne Buzare	24	1.78 m (5 ft 10 in)	Kourou		
2011	Anaële Veilleur	19	1.73 m (5 ft 8 in)	Remire-Montjoly	Top 12	
2010	Julie-Malika Grosse	18	1.74 m (5 ft 8 1/2 in)	Cayenne		
2009	Tineffa Naisso	20	1.79 m (5 ft 10 1/2 in)	Matoury	Top 12	
2008	Carmen Prince	20	1.72 m (5 ft 7 1/2 in)	Remire-Montjoly		
2007	Mandy Nicolas	18	1.82 m (5 ft 11 1/2 in)	Kourou	Top 12	
2006	Glawdys Epailly	20	1.75 m (5 ft 9 in)	Montsinéry-Tonnegrande		
2005	Leilia Chérubin-Jeannette	20	1.76 m (5 ft 9 1/2 in)	Iracoubo		
2004	Céline Claire-Eugénie	22	1.80 m (5 ft 11 in)		Top 12	
2003	Méïda Bourgeois					
2002	Stella Gauthier					
2001	Dhéa Samson					
2000	Myriam Hyerso			Cayenne		
1999	Sylvia Montoute	18	1.74 m (5 ft 8 1/2 in)			
1998	Sabrina Louis	19	1.79 m (5 ft 10 1/2 in)		Top 12	
1994	Nathalie Mathurin				Top 12	
1993	Radiah Latidine				2nd Runner-Up	
1988	Marie-Josée Nallamoutou-Sancho				Top 12	
1987	Lilia Roger					
1984	Rose Nicole Lony				Did not compete	Competed at Miss Universe 1984 (representing French Guiana)
1983	Marie-Georges Achamana				Did not compete	Competed at Miss Universe 1983 (representing French Guiana)
1977	Evelyne Randel				Did not compete	Competed at Miss Universe 1977 (representing French Guiana)
1960	George Néron				Did not compete	
