= Y'a pas photo =

Y'a pas photo was a French television program shown on TF1 from September 1997, produced by Loribel and animated by Laurent Fontaine and Pascal Bataille, with help from Sophie Thalmann, Sabrina Kléber, and Georges Chétochine. The program took as its subject various subjects from society, and also showed reports on associated subjects. Its style was altered in September 2001; it received a new decor, and showed more debates.

Among notable presenters on the program was Valérie Bénaïm.
