= Inès Ligron =

French fashion and beauty expert

- Born: Agnès Ligron; Montpellier, France
- Occupations: Entrepreneur; National director of Miss World Singapore (2016); National Director of Miss Universe Japan (1998-2009); President of Miss Universe France (2026-)
- Title: Miss Universe France President
- Website: http://inesligron.com/

Inès Ligron is a French fashion and beauty expert, best known for her work with fashion houses, beauty firms, advertising agencies, and magazine editors. Ligron also owns a beauty academy in Japan called WCBA by Ines Ligron. Ines is the face of IROKA by KAO in Japan and has developed 2 fragrances for their latest laundry products.

Ligron was the national director of Japan from 1997 until 2009, when she revamped the Miss Universe Japan pageant into a greater sponsorship and television event. She produced the 56th Miss Universe winner and two runners-up during her ten years with The Miss Universe Organization. On August 17, 2026, it was announced that Ligron had been appointed President of the Miss France Univers Committee.

Ligron filmed a French reality television series called Les Anges Gardiens (The Guardian Angels) with Jean-Claude Van Damme and Jean-Roch. Ligron is the former National Director of the Miss World Singapore Organization.

== Early life ==
Inés Ligron was born Agnès Ligron in Montpellier, France, the daughter of Pierre and Monique Ligron. Ligron changed her first name from Agnès to Spanish Inés (or French Inès) when she was 25, because she started working in Spain where people could not say her name correctly, and in English it sounded too old-fashioned. Ligron grew up in the South of France near Montpellier because her parents had to leave Paris due to the allergies of her younger brother. She has a sister, Mireille Ligron and a brother, Philippe Ligron. She studied literature, learned 3 languages, and enrolled in a fashion and cosmetic school in Montpellier called Inter Beaute. Before working as the National Director of Miss Universe in Japan, she worked with European cosmetic companies and designed a line of cosmetics consisting of make-up and skin care products for Montagut, and the products were to be sold in China. Ligron worked with IMG Models after moving to Hong Kong.

In 1995, Ligron became the Asia/Pacific director of IMG model in Hong Kong.

== Career ==
Acting as an agent for some Hollywood agencies, she has worked with Sarah Jessica Parker, Penélope Cruz, Jennifer Lopez, Maria Sharaprova, and Beyoncé, securing booking to contracts for endorsements and for multi-media events.

Based in Hong Kong, Ligron acted as IMG Models Asia-Pacific Director. IMG Models is a prominent modeling agency with headquarters in New York and celebrity supermodels such as Gigi Hadid, Miranda Keir, Tyra Banks, Milla Jovovich, Liv Tyler, Kaia Gerber, Gisele Bündchen, Carolyn Murphy, Alek Wek, Angela Lindervall, Nicki Taylor, and Lauren Hutton.

With the help of her numerous appearances on national televisions in Japan, France, and Hong Kong as a fashion leader, Ligron has reached many followers. Her success led her to sign a multi-year contract with a tele-marketing company called Oak Lawn Marketing whom produced a series of 8 DVDs which were the bible of fashion and beauty for any woman in Japan. Ligron's DVD sales are combined with the four books that she has published (three in Japan and two in Thailand).

Ligron was appointed Best National Director by the Miss Universe Organization in 2007.

Ligron has appeared on numerous magazines in Japan: (25 ans, Maquia, Voce, Biteki, AnAn, Grazia, Anhelo, Marie-Claire, Vogue, Domani, Elle, Bi-Story, Crea, More, Fytte, Croissant, Glamorous, Lucere, Da Vinci, Ar, Seven Seas, Hers, Alluxe, Vingtaine, WWD, Bijin-Hyakka, Pretteen, Spur, Savvy, Cheek, Pinky, Hanako, Tarzan, Nikkei Health...)

== Books ==
In the year 2011, Ligron published 2 books in Thailand. She published another book in Japan in 2012.

== Present work ==
Ligron is the CEO of WCBA, a chain of beauty schools in Japan.

Ligron appears several times a day on numerous Japanese television channels promoting her Ines Secret DVDs. She is also featured in women magazines in Japan. She is currently ranked by the Rakuten website as number 6 most influential personality in beauty and style (and the only foreigner to appear in the top 10 list).

On August 17, 2026, Ligron was appointed as the President of the Miss France Univers Committee following its separation from Miss France earlier that year.

== Personal life ==
Ligron is married to Ken Berger, a Jewish man.
