= Aurore Kichenin =

French beauty pageant model (born 1995)

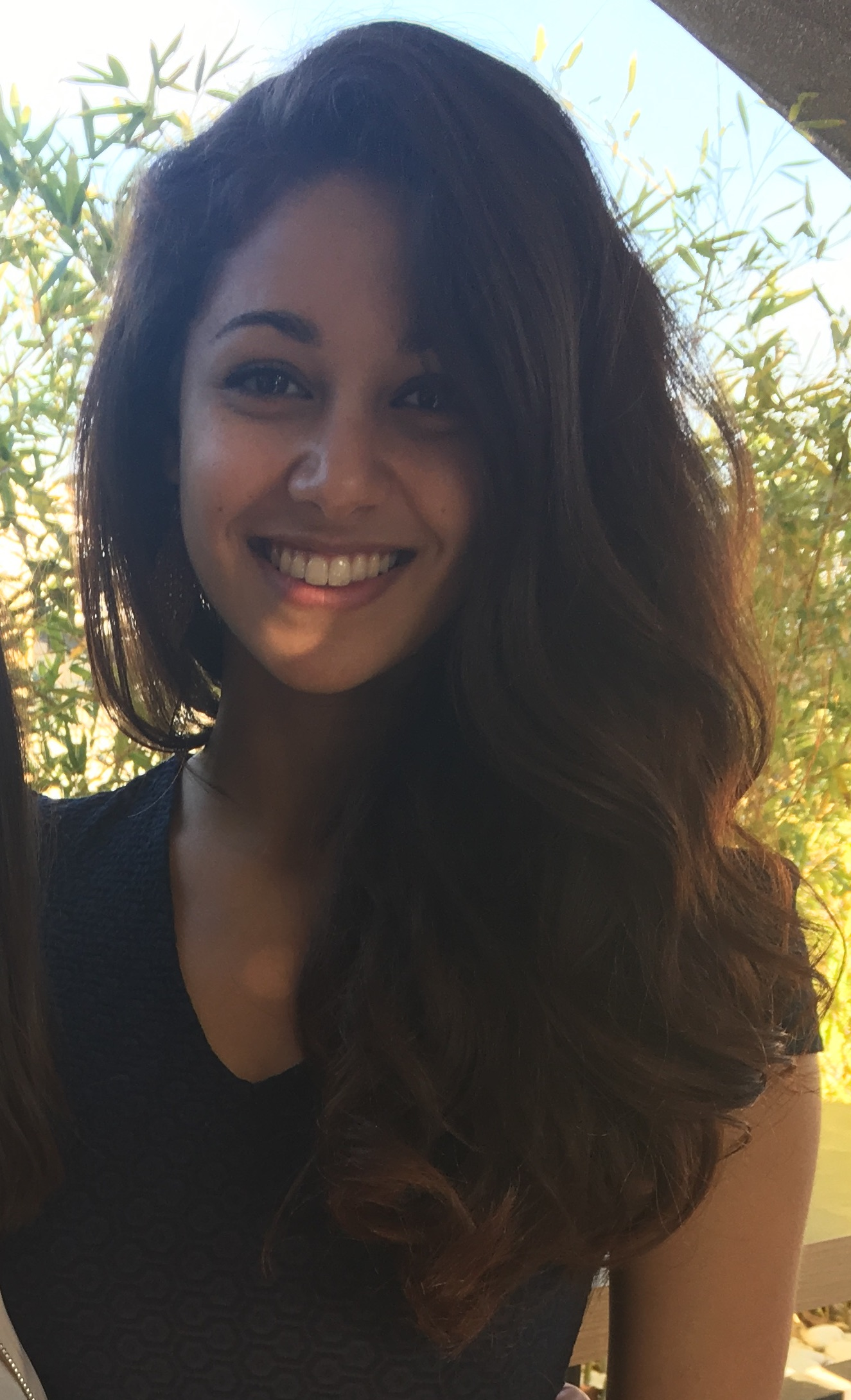
- Aurore Kichenin in 2017.
- Born: 23 January 1995 (age 31); Clamart, France
- Beauty pageant titleholder
- Title: Miss Palavas 2014; Miss Montpellier 2016; Miss Languedoc-Roussillon 2016; Miss World France 2017
- Hair color: Brown
- Eye color: Black
- Major competitions: Miss France 2017 (1st Runner-Up); Miss World 2017 (Top 5)

Aurore Kichenin (born 23 January 1995) is a French model, politician and beauty pageant titleholder who was the 1st Runner-Up at Miss France 2017 and represented France at Miss World 2017 in Sanya, after being Miss Languedoc-Roussillon 2016.

== Early life ==
Kichenin was born on 23 January 1995 in Clamart in the Hauts-de-Seine department to a Réunionese father of Malbar descent and a French mother of Polish descent. She later moved to the town of Jacou in the Hérault department, near Montpellier, where she was raised.

Kichenin was educated at Lycée Georges-Frêche in Montpellier, where she received a brevet de technicien supérieur (BTS) diploma in tourism in 2016. Prior to competing in Miss France, Kichenin was a third-year university student studying applied foreign languages with a specialization in Portuguese.

== Pageantry ==
=== Miss France 2017 ===
Kichenin began her pageantry career in 2014, when she was crowned Miss Palavas 2014. She later was crowned Miss Montpellier 2016 and was given the right to compete in the Miss Languedoc-Roussillon 2016 competition.

On 6 August 2016, she went on to be crowned Miss Languedoc-Roussillon 2016 in Carnon and received the right to represent Languedoc-Roussillon in Miss France 2017. On 17 December 2016 she competed at Miss France 2017 where she is the 1st runner-up.

=== Miss World 2017 ===
Aurore represented France at Miss World 2017 in Sanya, China where she placed in the Top 5. She was Top 30 in the Top Model competition and Top 20 in the Beauty with a Purpose competition.

== Politics ==
In 2021, Kichenin stood as a candidate in the 2021 French regional elections in Occitanie for The Republicans political party on the electoral list of Aurélien Pradié.

Awards and achievements
Preceded by (Martinique) Morgane Edvige	Miss World France; 2017	Succeeded by (Nord-Pas-de-Calais) Maëva Coucke
Preceded by (Martinique) Morgane Edvige	Miss France 1st Runner-Up; 2017	Succeeded by (Corsica) Eva Colas
Preceded by Anaïs Marin/Léna Stachurski	Miss Languedoc-Roussillon; 2016	Succeeded by Alizée Rieu
Preceded by Mathilda Barret	Miss Montpellier; 2016	Succeeded by Coline Vayssière
