= Angélique Angarni-Filopon =

French beauty pageant titleholder

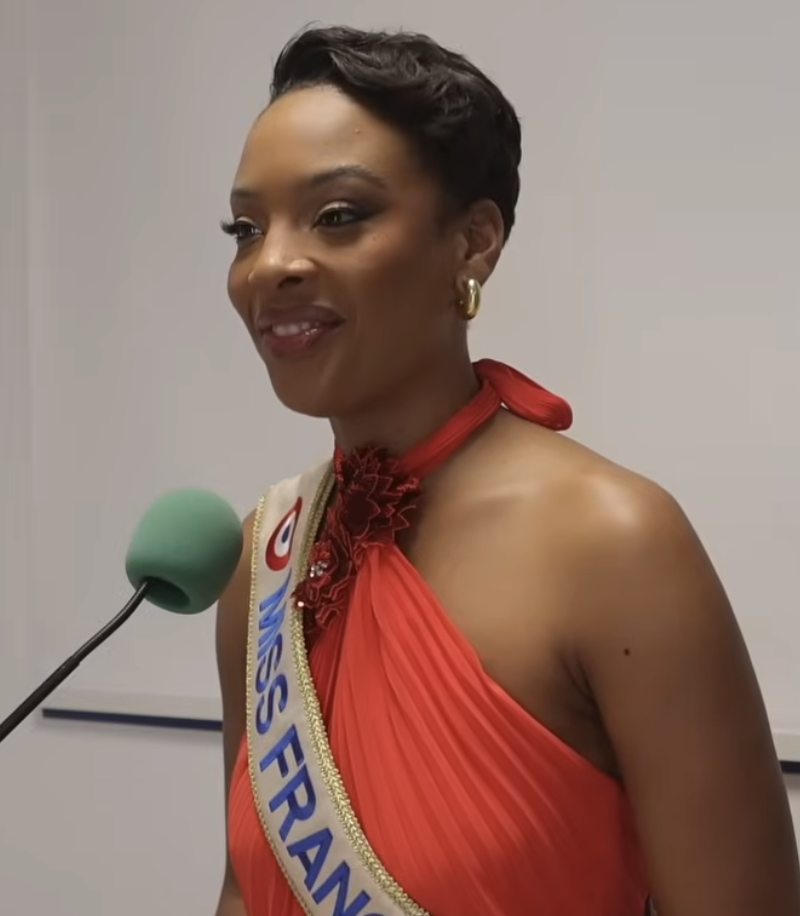
- Angarni-Filopon in 2025
- Born: Angélique Cindy Marie Denise Angarni-Filopon; 9 October 1990 (age 35); Sartrouville, France
- Height: 1.83 m (6 ft 0 in)
- Beauty pageant titleholder
- Title: Miss Martinique 2024; Miss France 2025
- Major competitions: Miss France 2025; (Winner)

Angélique Cindy Marie Denise Angarni-Filopon (born 9 October 1990) is a French beauty pageant titleholder who won Miss France 2025. She had previously won Miss Martinique 2024 and is the first woman from Martinique to win Miss France. At age 34, Angarni-Filopon was also the oldest woman to ever become Miss France.

== Early life ==
Angélique Cindy Marie Denise Angarni-Filopon was born on 9 October 1990 in the town of Sartrouville in the Yvelines department to Martinican parents Jean-Pierre Angarni and Viviane Filopon. Her father is a former police sergeant and local politician, while her mother worked as a nursing assistant. Angarni-Filopon's parents separated when she was 12 years old, and she was later raised in the town of Vauréal in the Val-d'Oise department with her siblings. After being raised in the Paris region, Angarni-Filopon relocated permanently to Martinique in 2023.

Angarni-Filopon began her career working as a sales advisor for Air France, and later trained to become a flight attendant. She began working as an Air Caraïbes flight attendant in 2017, and later worked as a bilingual assistant for the airline from 2020 to 2023. Prior to becoming Miss France, Angarni-Filopon was cabin crew for Corsair International.

== Pageantry ==
Angarni-Filopon's first pageant was Miss Martinique 2011, where she was first runner-up. The following year, she competed in the Miss Île-de-France 2012 pageant.

After the relaxation of eligibility rules, including the abolishment of the 18–24 age limit at Miss France, Angarni-Filopon entered and won Miss Martinique 2024, aged 33. She became the oldest woman to win a regional title and to enter Miss France.

Angarni-Filopon won Miss France 2025 on 14 December 2024 at the Futuroscope Arena. Having turned 34 years old in the months prior to the competition, Angarni-Filopon became the oldest woman to win Miss France, in addition to the first woman representing Martinique.

Angarni-Filopon's reign as Miss France ended on 6 December 2025, after she crowned Hinaupoko Devèze as her successor at Miss France 2026.

=== Cyberbullying and Charlie Hebdo controversy ===
Immediately after the Miss France 2025 competition, Angarni-Filopon was subjected to a wave of racism and criticism on social media due to her age and physical appearance. In response to the comments, Angarni-Filopon received the support of former Miss France titleholders including Diane Leyre, Alexandra Rosenfeld, and Flora Coquerel, and the Miss France Company stated that they would file a criminal complaint against the perpetrators.

The controversy was later intensified in January 2025, during an interview on Sud Radio. During the interview, Angarni-Filopon was asked about the right to blasphemy and whether she would say the "Je suis Charlie" slogan in honor of the 10-year anniversary of the Charlie Hebdo shooting. Angarni-Filopon declined to repeat the slogan or comment on her opinions on blasphemy, igniting widespread criticism on social media, including from Charlie Hebdo. Her decision to not respond to the questions was defended by several former Miss France titleholders, citing the responsibility of a Miss France titleholder to remain neutral during political debates. She had earlier refused to comment on the Pelicot rape case for the same reason, which also resulted in criticism and controversy. The controversy led to the decision to not renew national director Cindy Fabre's contract with the Miss France Company that month, and additionally led to the cancelation of the bulk of Angarni-Filopon's media appearances for several months. In November 2025, Miss France Company president Frédéric Gilbert revealed that Angarni-Filopon had considered resigning the Miss France title as a result of the Charlie Hebdo controversy, but ultimately decided not to. By the end of her reign in December 2025, the French media had remarked that Angarni-Filopon's reign as Miss France was marked by "low media presence".

== Post-pageantry ==
In December 2025, it was announced that Angarni-Filopon would appear as a celebrity contestant in the fifteenth season of the French version of Dancing with the Stars, which premiered in January 2026. Angarni-Filopon was partnered with French professional dancer Yann-Alrick Mortreuil. They were eliminated in the 13 March 2026 episode, becoming the fourth couple to be eliminated from the show.

Awards and achievements
Preceded by Eve Gilles	Miss France; 2025	Succeeded by Hinaupoko Devèze
Preceded by Chléo Modestine	Miss Martinique; 2024	Succeeded by Léaline Patry
