= Morgane Edvige =

French model and beauty pageant titleholder

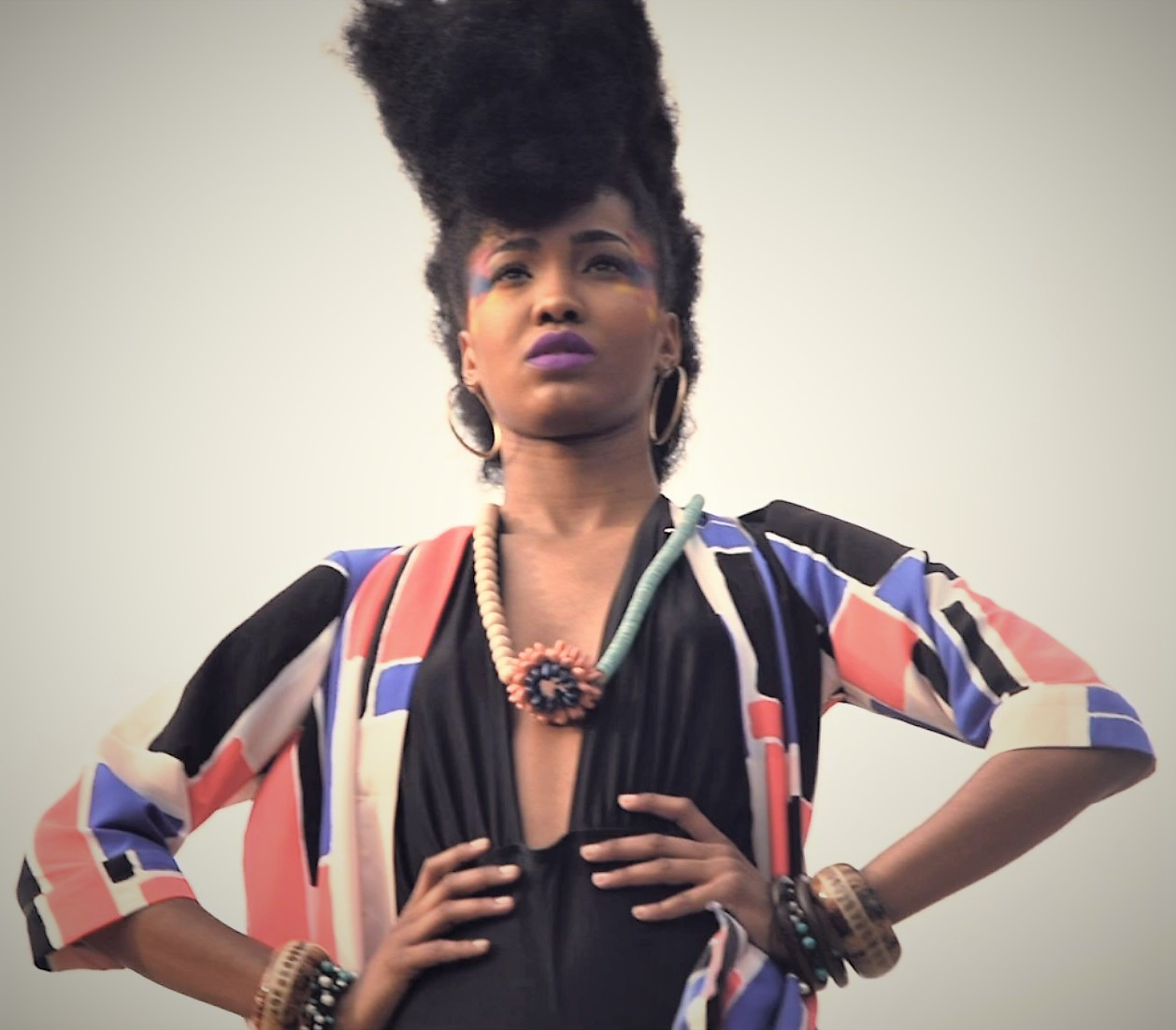
- Edvige at a modeling shoot at Sainte-Marie, Martinique in 2018
- Born: 24 April 1996 (age 30); Le François, Martinique
- Height: 1.78 m (5 ft 10 in)
- Beauty pageant titleholder
- Title: Miss Martinique 2015; Miss World France 2016
- Hair color: Brown
- Eye color: Black
- Major competitions: Miss Martinique 2015 (Winner); Miss France 2016 (1st Runner-Up); Miss World 2016 (Top 20)

Morgane Edvige (born 24 April 1996) is a French model and beauty pageant titleholder who was the 1st Runner-Up at Miss France 2016 and represented France at Miss World 2016 in United States.

== Personal life ==
Morgane works as a model in France.

== Pageantry ==
=== Miss France 2016 ===
On 25 September 2015, she went on to be crowned Miss Martinique 2015 in Fort-de-France and received the right to represent Martinique in Miss France 2016. On 19 December 2015 she competed as Miss Martinique at Miss France 2016 where she placed 1st Runner-Up. The winner, Iris Mittenaere, Miss Nord - Pas-de-Calais, was crowned Miss Universe 2016 in January 2017.

=== Miss World 2016 ===
Morgane represented France at Miss World 2016 in Washington, D.C. where she placed in the Top 20. She was Top 5 in the Top Model competition.

Awards and achievements
Preceded by (French Polynesia) Hinarere Taputu	Miss World France; 2016	Succeeded by (Languedoc-Roussillon) Aurore Kichenin
Preceded by (French Polynesia) Hinarere Taputu	Miss France 1st runner-up 2016	Succeeded by (Languedoc-Roussillon) Aurore Kichenin
Preceded by Moëra Michalon	Miss Martinique; 2015	Succeeded by Aurélie Joachim
