= Malika Ménard =

French beauty pageant titleholder

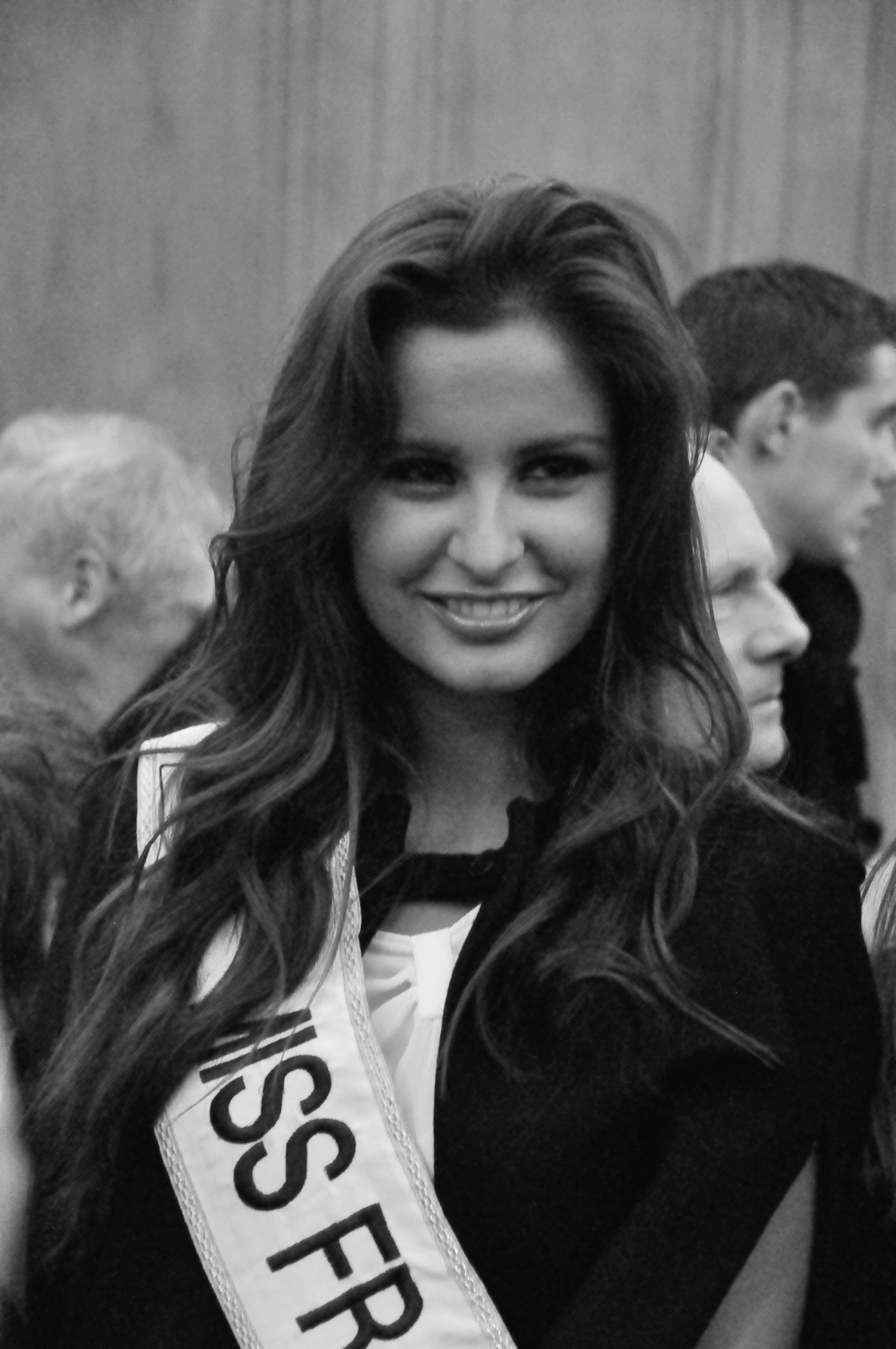
- Ménard in Caen in 2010
- Born: 14 July 1987 (age 39); Rennes, France
- Education: University of Caen Normandy
- Occupations: Model; television presenter
- Height: 1.76 m (5 ft 9 1/2 in)
- Beauty pageant titleholder
- Title: Miss Calvados 2009; Miss Normandy 2009; Miss France 2010
- Hair colour: Brown
- Eye colour: Blue
- Major competitions: Miss France 2010 (Winner); Miss Universe 2010 (Top 15)

Malika Ménard (born 14 July 1987) is a French model, tv host and beauty pageant titleholder, who was crowned Miss France 2010. She later represented France in Miss Universe 2010, placing in the Top 15.

== Life and career ==
=== Early life ===
Ménard was born on 14 July 1987 in Rennes, but later grew up in Hérouville-Saint-Clair. She received a baccalauréat degree in social sciences from Lycée Malherbe in Caen, and later began studying law at the University of Caen Normandy. She additionally worked as a hostess at Stade Michel d'Ornano and Stade Malherbe, Caen.

Her name, Malika, means "queen" in Arabic, and is very common in many Arab and Berber communities. She was firstly believed to be of Kabyle Berber descent; however, she has clarified that she is "100% French", and that her mother named her Malika because they lived in Morocco.

She is married to Karim, born in 1974, since 2024.

=== Pageantry ===
Ménard began her pageantry career after being crowned Miss Calvados 2009 on 17 September 2009. As Miss Calvados, she received the right to compete at the Miss Normandy 2009 competition, which she went on to win as well. She then was given the right to represent the region of Normandy at Miss France 2010.

Ménard went on to compete at Miss France 2010 in Nice, where she was crowned the winner. Ménard was the first winner of Miss France to be chosen solely by viewers rather than the judging panel, and she received 34% of the public vote. She later represented France at Miss Universe 2010 in Las Vegas, Nevada, placing within the Top 15. During Miss Universe 2010, Ménard was one of a number of contestants who refused to participate in a topless photoshoot. If she had agreed to participate, she would have faced dethronement as Miss France, as rules state that no titleholder may pose nude prior to, during, or after their reign.

Ménard crowned her successor Laury Thilleman in Caen on 4 December 2010.

=== Television career ===
In February 2011, Ménard began hosting the show Paris tout compris on France 3, replacing Virginie de Clausade who went on maternity leave. She later became the permanent host of the show the following year after de Clausade joined TF1. Since September 2013, Ménard has hosted the show Paris, le club with Jean-Philippe Lustyk on France 3. The show is dedicated to the Paris football club Paris Saint-Germain F.C.

On 28 June 2014, Ménard participated in the television game show Fort Boyard. In May 2015, she appeared in the music video for the song "On verra" by Nekfeu. She was also a judge at the Miss France 2017 competition in Montpellier on 17 December 2016. In May 2017, she joined the channel NRJ 12 to host Dans les secrets de..., an investigative program. In June of that year, she also began hosting 9h50 le matin en Normandie on France 3 Normandie.

Awards and achievements
Preceded by (Midi-Pyrénées) Chloé Mortaud	Miss Universe France; 2010	Succeeded by (Brittany) Laury Thilleman
Preceded by (Midi-Pyrénées) Chloé Mortaud	Miss France; 2010	Succeeded by (Brittany) Laury Thilleman
Preceded by Johanna Moreau	Miss Normandy; 2009	Succeeded by Juliette Polge
Preceded by Marie-Line Pardoel	Miss Calvados; 2009	Succeeded by Anastasia Lécureur
