= Alicia Aylies =

French model

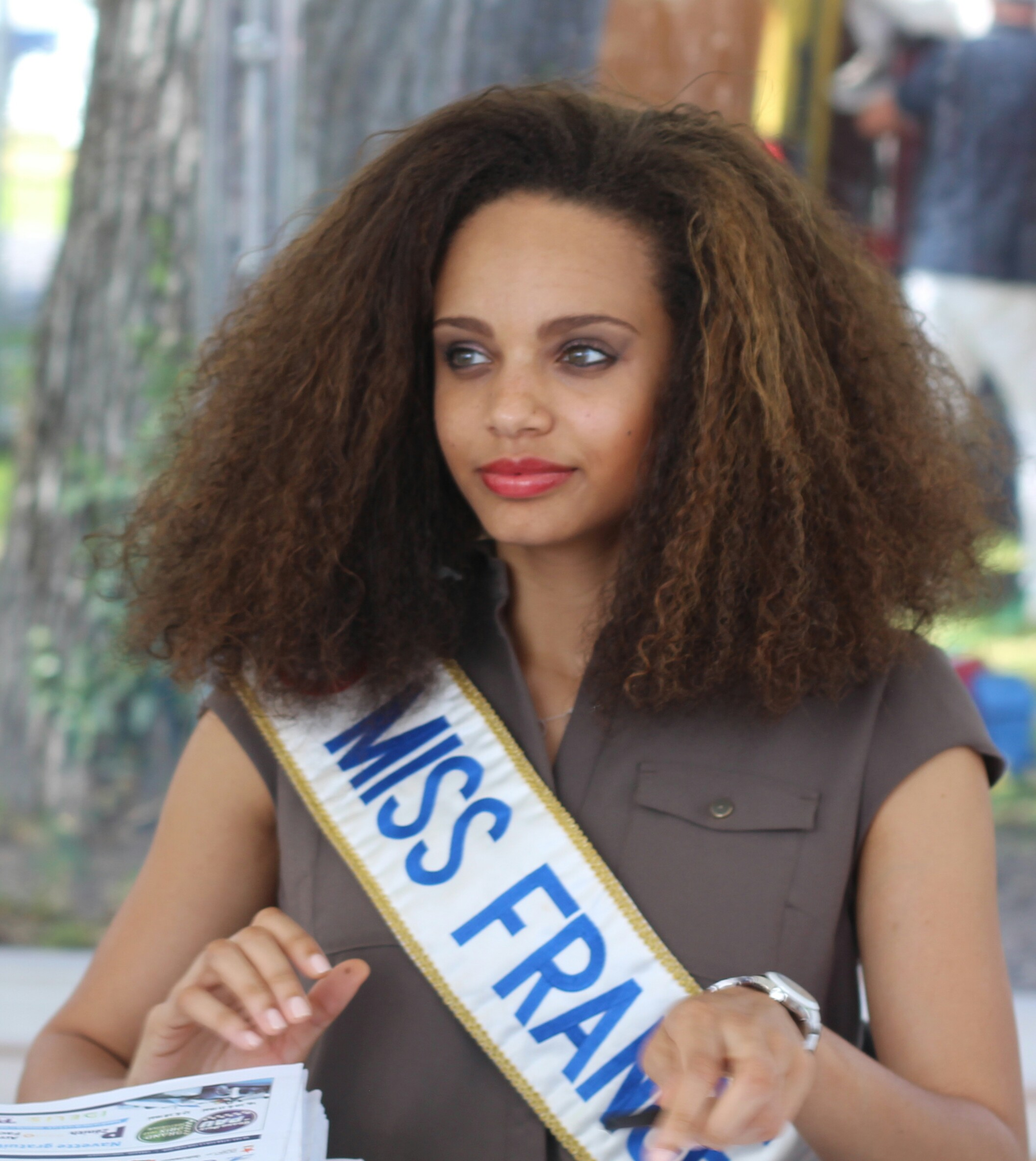
- Alicia Aylies in 2017
- Born: 21 April 1998 (age 28); Fort-de-France, Martinique, France
- Education: University of French Guiana
- Occupation: Model
- Height: 1.77 m (5 ft 9 1/2 in)
- Children: 1
- Beauty pageant titleholder
- Title: Miss French Guiana 2016; Miss France 2017
- Hair color: Brown
- Eye color: Green
- Major competitions: Miss France 2017 (Winner); Miss Universe 2017 (Unplaced)
- Musical career
- Genres: Pop; R&B
- Instrument: Vocals
- Years active: 2021–present
- Label: Scorpio

Alicia Aylies (born 21 April 1998) is a French singer, model, and beauty pageant titleholder who was crowned Miss France 2017. Aylies had previously won Miss French Guiana 2016, becoming the first representative from French Guiana to win Miss France. She later represented France at Miss Universe 2017.

After completing her reign as Miss France, Aylies began a music career. She released her debut single "Mojo" with Scorpio Music in December 2021.

== Life and career ==
Aylies was born on 21 April 1998 in Fort-de-France to Martiniquais parents. Her father, Philippe Aylies, works as an environmental manager, and her mother, Marie-Chantal Belfroy, is a driving school instructor. Aylies is an only child.

When she was two years old, her parents separated and Aylies moved to Matoury, French Guiana with her mother. She attended school in Remire-Montjoly and graduated from lycée with a diploma in science in 2016. After graduating, she began studying law at the University of French Guiana.

== Pageantry ==
=== Miss France 2017 ===
Aylies represented French Guiana at the Miss France 2017 pageant. On 17 December 2016, she was crowned Miss France by Miss France 2016 Iris Mittenaere in Montpellier. She is the first Miss French Guiana to be crowned Miss France. In January 2017, she accompanied then-national director Sylvie Tellier to the Philippines to watch her Miss France predecessor Iris Mittenaere win the title of Miss Universe 2016.

=== Miss Universe 2017 ===
As Miss France 2017, Aylies represented France at the Miss Universe 2017 pageant and was one of the heavy favourites but was unplaced.

== Post-pageantry ==
Aylies embarked on a music career in 2021, with the release of her debut single "Mojo" in December 2021, by French music label Scorpio Music.

== Personal life ==
In December 2022, Aylies announced that she was pregnant with her first child. She later gave birth to a daughter in April 2023.

== Discography ==
=== Singles ===
| Single | Year | Peak chart positions | Album |
| Single | Year | FRA | Album |
|---|---|---|---|
| "Mojo" | 2021 | — | Non-album singles |
| "Abuser" | 2022 | — | Non-album singles |

Awards and achievements
| Preceded by (Nord-Pas-de-Calais) Iris Mittenaere | Miss Universe France; 2017 | Succeeded by (Corsica) Eva Colas |
| Preceded by (Nord-Pas-de-Calais) Iris Mittenaere | Miss France; 2017 | Succeeded by (Nord-Pas-de-Calais) Maëva Coucke |
| Preceded by Estelle Merlin | Miss French Guiana; 2016 | Succeeded by Ruth Briquet |
