= Sophie Thalmann =

French model (born 1976)

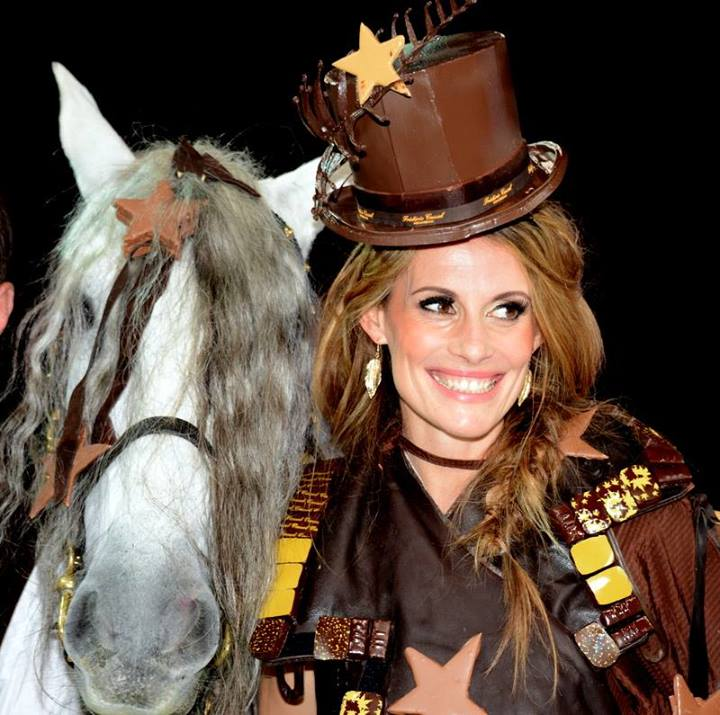
- Sophie Thalmann in 2013 at the Salon du Chocolat.
- Born: 7 May 1976 (age 50); Bar-le-Duc, Meuse, France
- Height: 5 ft 11 in (1.80 m)
- Spouse: Christophe Soumillon
- Beauty pageant titleholder
- Title: Miss France 1998
- Major competitions: Miss Lorraine 1997; Miss Meuse; Miss Universe 1998 (Unplaced)

Sophie Thalmann (born 7 May 1976) is a French tv host and beauty pageant titleholder. She was crowned Miss Lorraine 1997 and Miss France 1998.

== Early life and education ==
Thalmann was born in Bar-le-Duc in the department of Meuse, the daughter of the owner of a driving school and a seamstress. She studied in Nancy and gained a diploma in public relations in the arts and cultural sector. She then studied at the European Institute of Cinema and Audiovisual at the University of Lorraine in Nancy.

== Miss France ==
In 1996, at the age of 20, Thalmann won the title of Miss Meuse and was runner up in the Miss Lorraine contest. The following year she won the title of Miss Lorraine in Bar-le-Duc, which qualified her to enter the Miss France contest on 13 December 1997. She was crowned Miss France at age 21 in Deauville in front of a TV audience of 15 million.

For the year she reigned as Miss France, Thalmann travelled the country with Geneviève de Fontenay, director of Miss France, and appeared as a guest in a number of television programmes. She participated in the game shows une famille en or on TF1 and Fort Boyard on France 2.

On 12 May 1998, Thalmann represented France at the Miss Universe contest, which took place in Honolulu, but did not make it into the final ten. For the Miss World contest that took place on 26 November 1998 in Mahé, Seychelles, she was replaced by her first runner-up Véronique Caloc, who went on to be first runner-up to Linor Abargil. On 12 July 1998 she appeared at the FIFA World Cup Final at the Stade de France, where France were victorious over Brazil.

== Television career ==
Thalmann began her career on television in 1999 with her first season on Téléfoot on TF1. For three seasons she co-hosted the programme alongside Thierry Roland. She then co-hosted other programmes on the same channel such as Y'a pas photo (1999–2000), Les Petits Princes (2000), Combien ça coûte ? (2001–2002) with Jean-Pierre Pernaut and Le bêtisier du sport (2001–02).

In 2004, she co-hosted with Vous pouvez répéter la question ? on France 3. She then presented Le matin de Diane on 10 June 2007 on the Equidia channel. From 2006 to 2009 she presented Sophie club and once a month during the season from 2004–05 she presented J'ai aimé un cheval. In November 2009, she started presenting Ch'val dire à Sophie on the same channel. She also hosted radio programmes including Passionnément Sophie in 2001 on France Bleu Sud Lorraine and Les tontons footeux in 2003 on RTL.

== Personal life ==
Thalmann married Belgian jockey Christophe Soumillon on 22 July 2006. The couple have three children, daughter Charlie (born September 2005), son Mika (born November 2008) and son Robin (born April 2017).

== Titles ==
- Miss France 1998
- Miss Lorraine 1997
- 1st runner-up at Miss Lorraine 1996
- Miss Meuse 1996

== Books ==
- 2001 : Ça fait quoi d'être Miss France ? (Michel Lafon)
- 2003 : Cheval mon ami (Jacques-Marie Laffont)
- 2006 : Passions chevaux (Flammarion)
- 2008 : Au galop (Hachette)
- 2009 : Mon journal d'équitation (Hachette)
- 2013 : Un nouveau pensionnaire, Book 1 of series: Mes amis les chevaux (Hachette jeunesse)
