= La Frette, Isère =

La Frette
- Commune
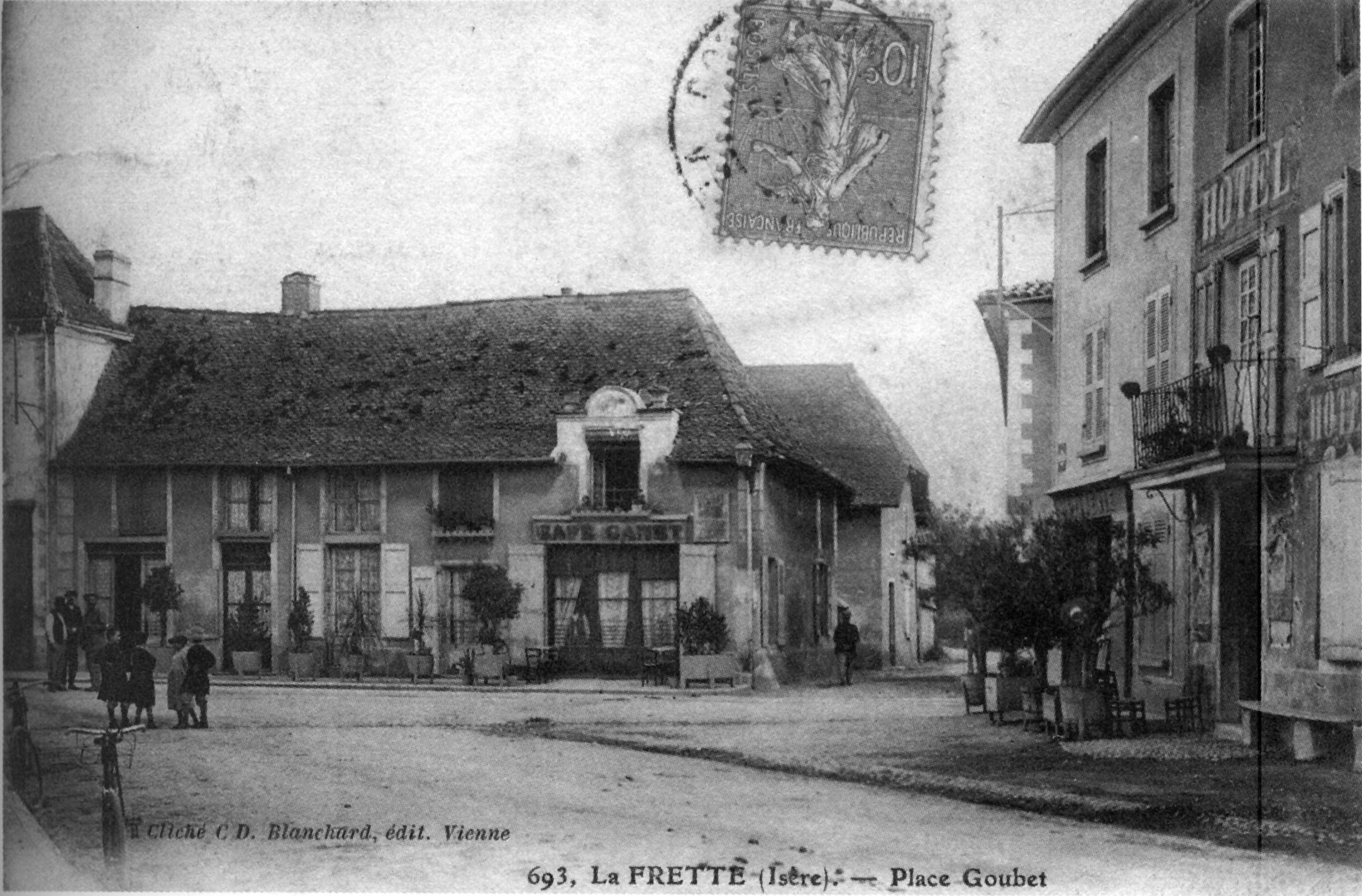
- La Frette in 1906
- Location of La Frette
- Location within France Location within Auvergne-Rhône-Alpes
- Coordinates: 45°23′29″N 5°21′41″E
- Country: France
- Region: Auvergne-Rhône-Alpes
- Department: Isère
- Arrondissement: Vienne
- Canton: Bièvre

Government
  - Mayor (2020–2026): Bernard Crézé
- Area^{1}: 11.8 km^{2} (4.6 sq mi)
- Elevation: 430 m (1,410 ft)
- Highest elevation: 669 m (2,195 ft)
- Lowest elevation: 407 m (1,335 ft)
- Population (2023): 1,083
  - Density: 91.8/km^{2} (238/sq mi)
- Time zone: UTC+01:00 (CET)
  - Summer (DST): UTC+02:00 (CEST)
- INSEE/Postal code: 38174 /38260
- ^{1} French Land Register data, which excludes lakes, ponds, glaciers > 1 km^{2} (0.386 sq mi or 247 acres) and river estuaries.

La Frette (French pronunciation: [la fʁɛt]) is a commune in the Isère department in southeastern France.

== Population ==
Historical population
Year	Pop.	±% p.a.
1968	764	—
1975	729	−0.67%
1982	810	+1.52%
1990	870	+0.90%
1999	822	−0.63%
2007	1,023	+2.77%
2012	1,101	+1.48%
2017	1,094	−0.13%
2023	1,083	−0.17%
Source: INSEE

== See also ==
- Communes of the Isère department
