= Miss France 2010 =

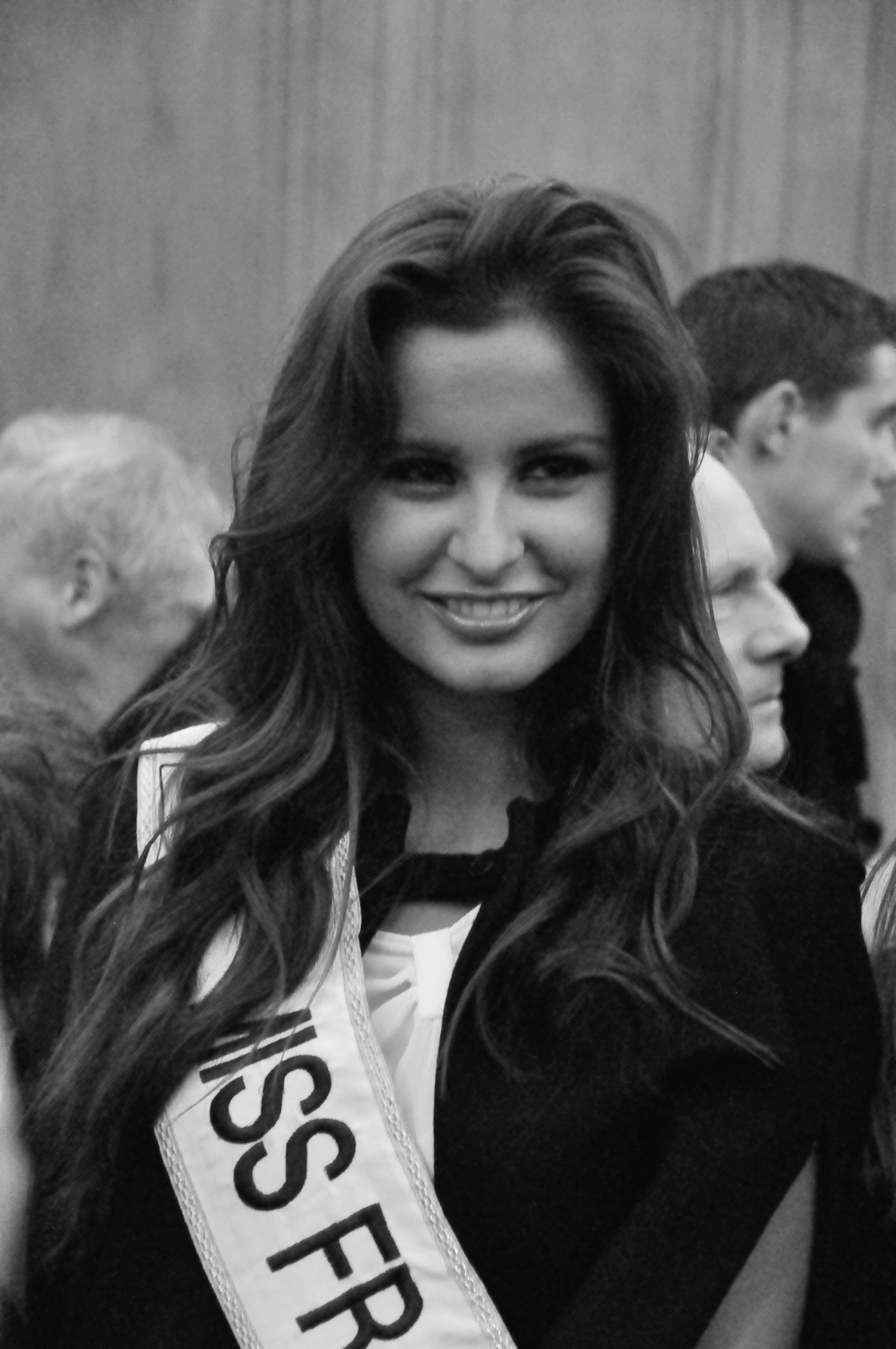
- Date: December 5, 2009
- Presenters: Jean-Pierre Foucault; Genevieve de Fontenay; Sylvie Tellier; Yves Derisbourg
- Entertainment: Robbie Williams
- Venue: Palais Nikaïa, Nice, Provence-Alpes-Côte d'Azur, France
- Broadcaster: TF1
- Entrants: 37
- Placements: 12
- Debuts: Béarn-Gascogne
- Withdrawals: Languedoc-Roussillon; New Caledonia
- Returns: Languedoc; Roussillon
- Winner: Malika Ménard; Normandy
- Congeniality: Kelly Bochenko; Paris
- Photogenic: Lisa Alberici; Île-de-France

Miss France 2010 was the 63rd Miss France pageant, held at the Palais Nikaïa in Nice, Provence-Alpes-Côte d'Azur, France, on 5 December 2009. Malika Ménard of Normandy was crowned by Chloé Mortaud of Albigeois Midi-Pyrénées at the end of the event.

For the first time since 1987, Miss France was chosen by viewer voting, after the five finalists had been announced during the live broadcast. Only the judges had selected the five finalists out of the top twelve.

The 37 contestants traveled to Martinique for fashion shoots, videos and interviews, from 13 to 21 November.

== Results ==
=== Placements ===
| Placement | Contestant |
|---|---|
| Miss France 2010 | Normandy – Malika Ménard |
| 1st Runner-Up | Rhône-Alpes – Virginie Dechenaud |
| 2nd Runner-Up | Brittany – Mélanie Craignou |
| 3rd Runner-Up | Provence – Emilie Corbi |
| 4th Runner-Up | Quercy Rouergue – Nathalie Ample |
| Top 12 | Champagne-Ardenne – Cécile Brandao; Côte d'Azur – Anaïs Governatori; French Guiana – Tineffa Naïsso; Limousin – Justine Posé; Mayotte – Elodie Anridhoini; Orléanais – Cassandre Roland; Pays de Savoie – Edwige Tiare |

=== Order of announcements ===
Top 12

- 1. Rhône Alpes
- 2. Champagne Ardenne
- 3. Orléanais
- 4. Brittany
- 5. Quercy Rouergue
- 6. Normandy

- 7. Mayotte
- 8. Provence
- 9. French Guiana
- 10. Côte d'Azur
- 11. Limousin
- 12. Pays de Savoie

Top 5

- 1. Normandy
- 2. Provence
- 3. Quercy Rouergue
- 4. Rhône Alpes
- 5. Brittany

== Preliminary events ==
=== Martinique ===
The delegates of Miss France 2010 visited the island of the Martinique for their preparation trip. They visited the island but they also did photo shoots and other activities.

== Judges ==
- Arielle Dombasle - Actress
- Jean-Luc Reichmann - Television Personality
- Mareva Galanter - Miss France 1999
- Jean-Paul Gaultier - Designer
- Farida Khelfa- Actress
- Jimmy Jean-Louis - Actor on NBC's Heroes
- Xavier Deluc - Actor

== Contestants ==
| Region | Name | Age | Height | Hometown |
|---|---|---|---|---|
| Albigeois Midi-Pyrénées | Laura Faroult | 21 | 1,73 | Lavelanet |
| Alsace | Sophie Mathes | 19 | 1,72 | Strasbourg |
| Aquitaine | Aurélie Zengerlin | 21 | 1,77 | Douzillac |
| Artois Hainaut | Astrid Ponchel | 21 | 1,79 | Maubeuge |
| Auvergne | Mégane Potier | 19 | 1,73 | Vichy |
| Béarn Gascogne | Marine Bories | 20 | 1,72 | Léon |
| Berry Val de Loire | Elodie Martel | 19 | 1,72 | Dreux |
| Brittany | Mélanie Craignou | 19 | 1,78 | Louannec |
| Burgundy | Jenna Tournay | 19 | 1,75 | Talant |
| Champagne Ardenne | Cécile Brandao | 21 | 1,72 | Saint-Dizier |
| Corsica | Célina Nicolai | 21 | 1,77 | Ajaccio |
| Côte d'Azur | Anaïs Governatori | 20 | 1,72 | Nice |
| Flandre | Aline Bourgeois | 20 | 1,75 | Roubaix |
| Franche-Comté | Estelle Diop | 19 | 1,80 | Belfort |
| French Guiana | Tineffa Naïsso | 20 | 1,79 | Kourou |
| Guadeloupe | Angélique Duro | 20 | 1,78 | Saint-François |
| Île de France | Lisa Alberici | 20 | 1,78 | Valenton |
| Languedoc | Manon Ricci | 18 | 1,73 | Montpellier |
| Limousin | Justine Posé | 18 | 1,77 | Chameyrat |
| Loire Forez | Marion Léoncini | 23 | 1,78 | Montbrison |
| Lorraine | Marina Garau | 22 | 1,70 | Bouzonville |
| Martinique | Cindy Chenière | 20 | 1,75 | le François |
| Mayotte | Élodie Anridhoini | 19 | 1,74 | Chirongui |
| Normandy | Malika Ménard | 22 | 1,76 | Hérouville-Saint-Clair |
| Orléanais | Cassandre Roland | 18 | 1,71 | Orléans |
| Paris | Kelly Bochenko | 23 | 1,75 | Paris |
| Pays de la Loire | Amélie Taugourdeau | 23 | 1,70 | Le Coudray-Macouard |
| Pays de Savoie | Édwige Tiare | 22 | 1,77 | Albertville |
| Picardy | Juliette Boubaaya | 19 | 1,72 | Saint-Quentin |
| Poitou Charentes | Rachel Jeannot | 23 | 1,73 | Civray |
| Provence | Emilie Corbi | 21 | 1,76 | Bouc-Bel-Air |
| Quercy Rouergue | Nathalie Ample | 19 | 1,79 | Labastide-Saint-Pierre |
| Réunion | Kim Hoa Buraut | 18 | 1,82 | Saint Denis |
| Rhône-Alpes | Virginie Dechenaud | 23 | 1,74 | La Frette |
| Roussillon | Céline Callivrousis | 22 | 1,70 | Perpignan |
| St. Pierre & Miquelon | Marie Serba | 18 | 1,80 | Saint-Pierre |
| Tahiti | Léna Bonno | 20 | 1,77 | Moorea |

== Regional pageant notes ==
=== Region changes ===
- Languedoc-Roussillon, split into Languedoc and Roussilllon

=== Returning region ===
- Bearn-Gascogne

=== Withdrawals ===
- New Caledonia

== Crossovers ==
Contestants who previously competed or will be competing at international beauty pageants:

Miss Universe

- 2010: Normandy - Malika Ménard (Top 15)
  - (Las Vegas, United States)
  - France's representative

Miss World

- 2010: Rhône Alpes - Virginie Dechenaud (Top 25)
  - (Sanya, China)
  - France's representative

Miss Caraïbes Hibiscus

- 2010: French Guiana - Tineffa Naïsso (Winner)
  - (St Martin, France)
  - Guyane's representative
