= Miss France 2017 =

87th Miss France competition, national beauty pageant edition

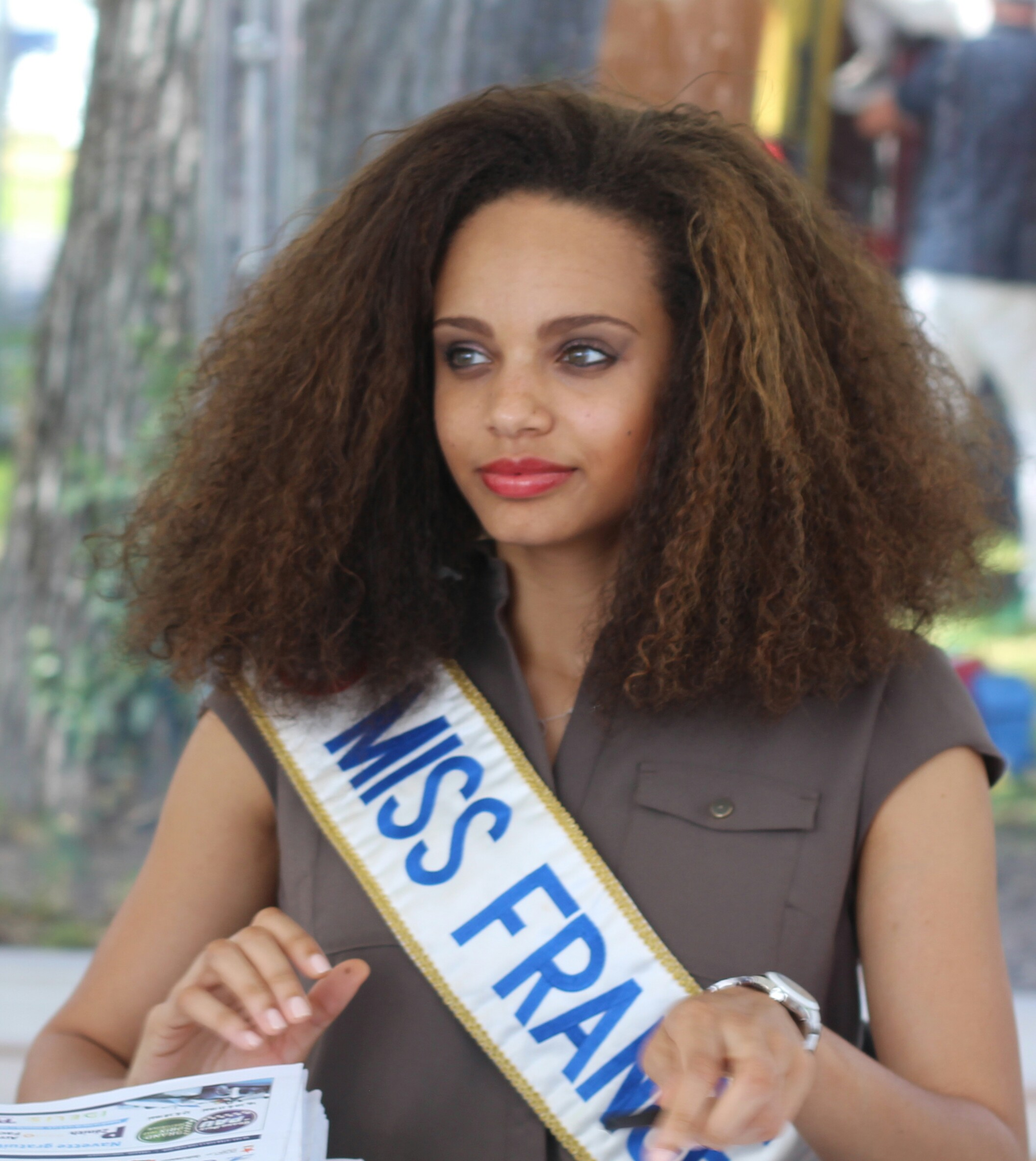
- Miss France 2017 Alicia Aylies
- Date: 17 December 2016
- Presenters: Jean-Pierre Foucault; Sylvie Tellier; Iris Mittenaere
- Venue: Park&Suites Arena, Montpellier
- Broadcaster: TF1
- Entrants: 30
- Placements: 12
- Debuts: St. Martin and St. Barthelemy
- Withdrawals: Languedoc; Roussillon; St. Pierre and Miquelon
- Returns: Languedoc-Roussillon
- Winner: Alicia Aylies; French Guiana
- Congeniality: Myrtille Cauchefer; Picardy
- Photogenic: Jade Scotte; Côte d'Azur

Miss France 2017 was the 87th edition of the Miss France pageant, held on 17 December 2016, at Park&Suites Arena in Montpellier.

It was the first time that the pageant took place in Montpellier and in the Languedoc-Roussillon region.

The ceremony was held at TF1, and was presented by Jean-Pierre Foucault and the national director Sylvie Tellier.

The winner was Miss French Guiana, Alicia Aylies, who gave to her region its first ever Miss France title. The winner succeeded Iris Mittenaere, Miss France 2016 from Nord-Pas-de-Calais.

== Results ==
=== Placements ===
| Placement | Contestant |
|---|---|
| Miss France 2017 | Guyane – Alicia Aylies |
| 1st Runner-Up | Languedoc-Roussillon – Aurore Kichenin |
| 2nd Runner-Up | Tahiti – Vaea Ferrand |
| 3rd Runner-Up | Guadeloupe – Morgane Thérésine |
| 4th Runner-Up | Lorraine – Justine Kamara |
| Top 12 | Reunion – Ambre Nguyen (5th runner-up); Brittany – Maurane Bouazza (6th runner-up); Alsace - Claire Godard; Aquitaine - Axelle Bonnemaison; Île-de-France – Meggy Pyaneeandee; Normandy – Esther Houdement; Picardy – Myrtille Cauchefer |

== Preparation ==
The 30 contestants, Iris Mittenaere and the national director Sylvie Tellier had travelled to Reunion Island from 23 November to 1 December. The rehearsals took place in Montpellier.

The theme of the 2017 event was Le Noël des Miss (The Misses' Christmas). Each round centered around a different theme related to the celebration of Christmas. Iris Mittenaere appeared as a Christmas fairy, turning the pages of a storybook to reveal each segment.

- Presentation round, group 1: Christmas toys
- Presentation round, group 2: Ice floes
- Regional costumes: Christmas market (featuring Flora Coquerel and Camille Cerf)
- Swimsuits: Christmas elves
- Announcement of top 12
- Top 12 evening gown: Winter palace
- Top 12 swimsuit: Christmas in Réunion
- Announcement of top 5
- Top 5 presentation round: Christmas illuminations
- Top 5 evening gown: Christmas Eve

== Contestants ==
| Region | Name | Age | Height | Hometown | Elected on |
|---|---|---|---|---|---|
| Alsace | Claire Godard | 19 | 181 cm (5 ft 11 1/2 in) | Riedisheim | 4 September in Pulversheim |
| Aquitaine | Axelle Bonnemaison | 19 | 176 cm (5 ft 9 1/2 in) | Castelculier | 8 October in Villeneuve-sur-Lot |
| Auvergne | Océane Faure | 20 | 171 cm (5 ft 7 1/2 in) | Moulins | 21 October in Montluçon |
| Brittany | Maurane Bouazza | 20 | 173 cm (5 ft 8 in) | Plumelin | 30 September in Gourin |
| Burgundy | Naomi Bailly | 21 | 171 cm (5 ft 7 1/2 in) | Neuilly-lès-Dijon | 18 September in Chevigny-Saint-Sauveur |
| Centre − Loire Valley | Cassandre Joris | 20 | 170 cm (5 ft 7 in) | Prasville | 17 September in Déols |
| Champagne-Ardenne | Charlotte Patat | 19 | 182 cm (5 ft 11 1/2 in) | Cormontreuil | 23 September in Bar-sur-Aube |
| Corsica | Laetitia Duclos | 19 | 170 cm (5 ft 7 in) | Porticcio | 9 September in Porticcio |
| Côte d'Azur | Jade Scotte | 23 | 172 cm (5 ft 7 1/2 in) | Castellar | 7 August in Cogolin |
| Franche-Comté | Melissa Nourry | 20 | 171 cm (5 ft 7 1/2 in) | Pirey | 23 October in Dole |
| French Guiana | Alicia Aylies | 18 | 177 cm (5 ft 9 1/2 in) | Matoury | 8 October in Cayenne |
| Guadeloupe | Morgane Thérésine | 21 | 177 cm (5 ft 9 1/2 in) | Le Gosier | 27 August in Terre-de-Haut |
| Île-de-France | Meggy Pyaneeandee | 22 | 172 cm (5 ft 7 1/2 in) | Le Blanc-Mesnil | 29 June in Paris |
| Languedoc-Roussillon | Aurore Kichenin | 21 | 174 cm (5 ft 8 1/2 in) | Castelnau-le-Lez | 6 August in Carnon |
| Limousin | Romane Komar | 18 | 175 cm (5 ft 9 in) | Feytiat | 16 September in Brive-la-Gaillarde |
| Lorraine | Justine Kamara | 19 | 172 cm (5 ft 7 1/2 in) | Dombasle-sur-Meurthe | 3 September in Vittel |
| Martinique | Aurélie Joachim | 18 | 179 cm (5 ft 10 1/2 in) | Ducos | 14 October in Fort-de-France |
| Mayotte | Naima Madi Mahadali | 19 | 175 cm (5 ft 9 in) | Bouéni | 27 August in Mamoudzou |
| Midi-Pyrénées | Virginie Guillin | 23 | 178 cm (5 ft 10 in) | Tarascon-sur-Ariège | 7 October in Saint-Gaudens |
| New Caledonia | Andrea Lux | 18 | 175 cm (5 ft 9 in) | Bourail | 20 August in Païta |
| Nord-Pas-de-Calais | Laurine Maricau | 22 | 170 cm (5 ft 7 in) | Wavrin | 24 September in Orchies |
| Normandy | Esther Houdement | 20 | 183 cm (6 ft 0 in) | Butot | 11 October in Mortagne-au-Perche |
| Pays de Loire | Carla Loones | 21 | 177 cm (5 ft 9 1/2 in) | Le Fresne-sur-Loire | 1 October in Gorron |
| Picardy | Myrtille Cauchefer | 24 | 176 cm (5 ft 9 1/2 in) | Albert | 25 September in Beauvais |
| Poitou-Charentes | Magdalène Chollet | 19 | 172 cm (5 ft 7 1/2 in) | Neuville-de-Poitou | 16 October in Chateaubernard |
| Provence | Noémie Mazella | 19 | 176 cm (5 ft 9 1/2 in) | Marseille | 5 August in Cogolin |
| Réunion | Ambre Nguyen | 19 | 178 cm (5 ft 10 in) | Saint-Denis | 27 August in Saint-Denis |
| Rhône-Alpes | Camille Bernard | 20 | 173 cm (5 ft 8 in) | Grenoble | 22 October in Feurs |
| Saint Martin & Saint Barthélemy | Anaëlle Hippolyte | 18 | 175 cm (5 ft 9 in) | Marigot | 20 August in Grand Case |
| Tahiti | Vaea Ferrand | 22 | 175 cm (5 ft 9 in) | Papeete | 24 June in Papeete |

== Ranking ==
=== First round ===
A jury composed of partners (internal and external) of the company Miss France pre-selects 12 young women, during an interview that took place on 15 December.

| Numero | Contestant |
|---|---|
| 1 | Miss Ile-de-France |
| 2 | Miss Réunion |
| 3 | Miss Normandy |
| 4 | Miss Aquitaine |
| 5 | Miss French Guiana |
| 6 | Miss Languedoc-Roussillon |
| 7 | Miss Guadeloupe |
| 8 | Miss Alsace |
| 9 | Miss Lorraine |
| 10 | Miss Brittany |
| 11 | Miss Picardy |
| 12 | Miss Tahiti |

=== Second round ===
The 50% jury and the 50% public choose the five candidates who can still be elected. A ranking of 1 to 12 is established for each of the two parties.

| Contestant | Public | Jury | Total |
|---|---|---|---|
| Miss French Guiana | 12 | 12 | 24 |
| Miss Languedoc-Roussillon | 10 | 12 | 22 |
| Miss Tahiti | 11 | 9 | 20 |
| Miss Lorraine | 8 | 10 | 18 |
| Miss Guadeloupe | 9 | 9 | 18 |
| Miss Réunion | 7 | 7 | 14 |
| Miss Brittany | 6 | 5 | 11 |
| Miss Picardy | 4 | 5 | 9 |
| Miss Alsace | 5 | 3 | 8 |
| Miss Ile-de-France | 1 | 6 | 7 |
| Miss Aquitaine | 3 | 3 | 6 |
| Miss Normandy | 2 | 3 | 5 |

=== Last round ===
| Candidates | Results |
|---|---|
| Miss French Guiana | 27,89% |
| Miss Languedoc-Roussillon | 26,16% |
| Miss Tahiti | 21,66% |
| Miss Guadeloupe | 13,04% |
| Miss Lorraine | 11,27% |

== Special prizes ==
| Prize | Contestant |
|---|---|
| Prize of General Culture | Île-de-France – Meggy Pyaneeandee (18/20) |
| Prize of Elegance | Provence - Noémie Mazella |
| Prize "Best in swimsuit" | St Martin & St Barthélemy - Anaëlle Hyppolite |
| Prize "Best regional costume" | Brittany - Maurane Bouazza |
| Prize of Congeniality | Picardy - Myrtille Cauchefer |
| Prize "Miss Photogenic" | Côte d'Azur - Jade Scotte |

== Judges ==
The names of the judges were announced on November, 24:

| Membre | | Notes |
|---|---|---|
| Arielle Dombasle | Arielle Dombasle (president) | Actress and singer |
| Ingrid Chauvin | Ingrid Chauvin | Actress |
| Amir Haddad | Amir Haddad | Singer, French representative at Eurovision 2016 |
| Michèle Bernier | Michèle Bernier | Actress and humorist |
| Christophe Barratier | Christophe Barratier | Director and producer |
| Tony Yoka | Tony Yoka | Boxer, Olympic medalist in Rio Olympics 2016 |
| | Malika Ménard | Miss France 2010 |

== Notes about the contestants ==
- Miss French Guiana, Alicia Aylies, was born in Martinique.
- Miss Île-de-France, Meggy Pyaneeandee, was born in Paris to Mauritian parents.
- Miss Côte d'Azur, Maria Pavelin, was born in Zagreb, Croatia. She decided to withdraw from the competition due to a job opportunity. Subsequently, her first runner-up, Jade Scotte, took over.
- Miss Languedoc-Roussillon, Aurore Kichenin, has Reunionese, Polish and Russian origins.
- Miss Reunion Island, Ambre Nguyen, is of Vietnamese origin.
- Miss Lorraine, Justine Kamara, has Guadeloupean and Guinean origins.
- Miss Limousin, Romane Komar, is of Swedish origin.
- Miss Pays de Loire, Carla Loones, has Spanish and Flemish origins.
- the original Miss Centre, Loire Valley, Margaux Legrand-Guérineau, withdrew from her title for personal reasons. Her first runner-up Cassandre Joris assumed the title. On 4 November, Legrand-Guerineau announced that she was actually dethroned for some photos which were contrary to the rules of the pageant.
- The average age of the contestants is 19.9 and the average height is 1.75 m (5 ft 9 in)

== National and International placements ==
- French Guiana wins for the first time ever the Miss France pageant.
- Tahiti is placed for fifth consecutive time, for the fifth consecutive time in the top five and for the second consecutive time as second runner-up.
- Alsace is placed for fourth consecutive year.
- Aquitaine is placed for third consecutive year.
- Brittany and Reunion Island are placed for second consecutive year.
- Lorraine is placed for the first time since the Miss France 2009 pageant.
- Normandy is placed for the first time since the Miss France 2011 pageant.
- French Guiana is placed for the first time since the Miss France 2012 pageant.
- Ile-de-France, Guadeloupe and Picardy are placed for the first time since the Miss France 2015 pageant.
- Languedoc-Roussillon Aurore Kichenin placed as a Top 5 Finalist at Miss World 2017, held in Sanya, China.
- Martinique Aurélie Joachim placed as 3rd Runner-up at Miss World 2025 (representing Martinique), held in Telangana, India.
