= Miss France 2024 =

94th Miss France competition, national beauty pageant edition

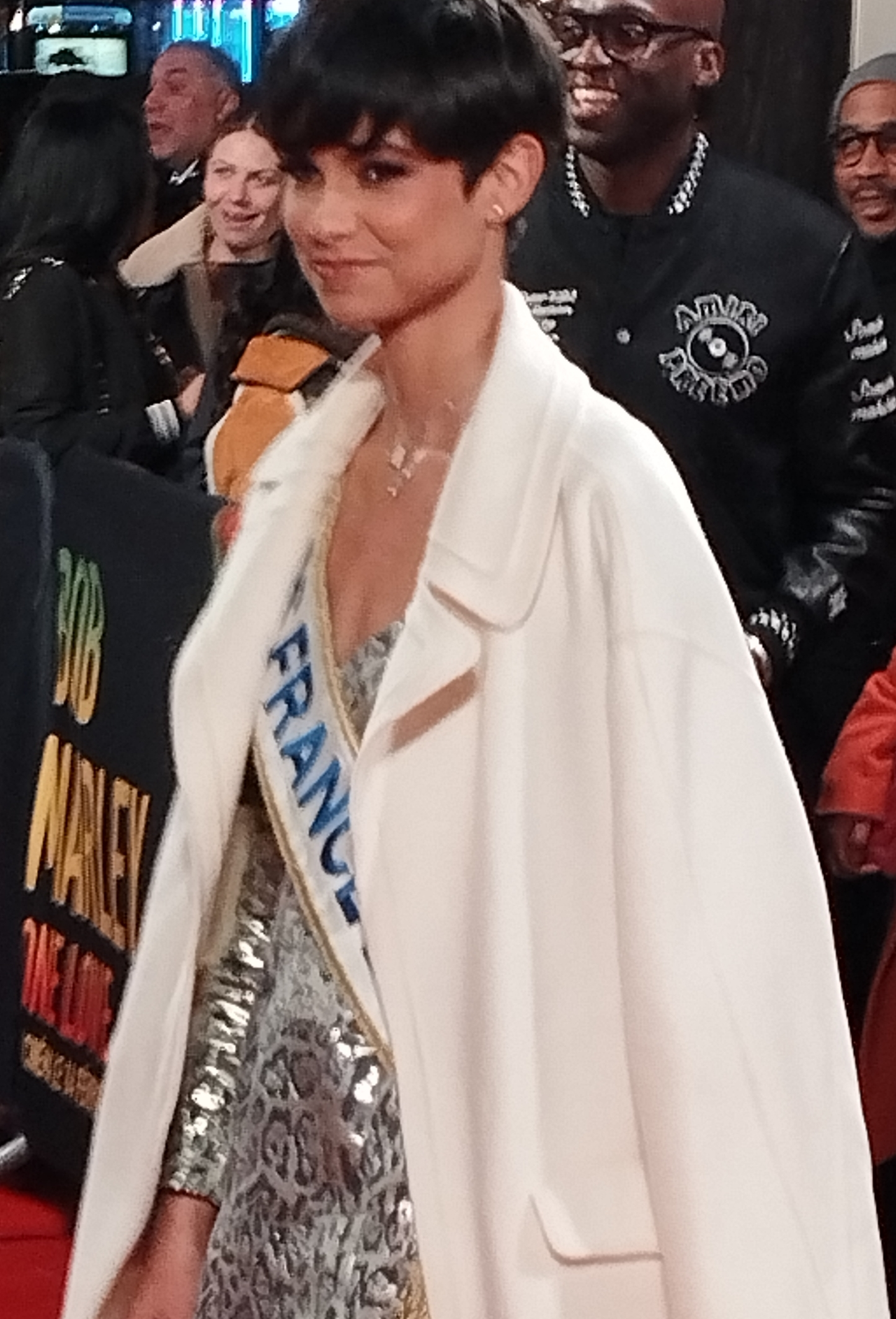
- Miss France 2024, Eve Gilles
- Date: 16 December 2023
- Presenters: Jean-Pierre Foucault; Cindy Fabre
- Venue: Zénith de Dijon, Dijon, Bourgogne-Franche-Comté
- Broadcaster: TF1; MyTF1
- Entrants: 30
- Placements: 15
- Withdrawals: Saint Martin and Saint Barthélemy
- Returns: Mayotte
- Winner: Eve Gilles; Nord-Pas-de-Calais

Miss France 2024 was the 94th edition of the Miss France pageant, held at the Zénith de Dijon in Dijon, France, on 16 December 2023. Indira Ampiot of Guadeloupe crowned Eve Gilles of Nord Pas-de-Calais as her successor at the end of the event.

The 2024 edition marked the first time Sylvie Tellier has not served as a co-presenter of the show since joining the production for Miss France 2009, following her departure from Miss France at the conclusion of Miss France 2023, in addition to the first edition since the death of Geneviève de Fontenay, the president of the Miss France Committee from 1981 to 2007. The 2024 edition was also the final edition of Miss France under the leadership of president Alexia Laroche-Joubert, who departed following the conclusion of the pageant.

== Background ==
=== Location ===
In December 2022, François Rebsamen, the mayor of Dijon and president of the Dijon Métropole, the most-populous city of Burgundy, confirmed that the city had applied to host the Miss France 2024 competition. In June 2023, it was reported by Le Bien Public that the 2024 competition would likely be held at the Zénith de Dijon in Dijon, although this was not yet confirmed by the Miss France Committee. Le Bien Public confirmed later that month that the competition would indeed be held at the Zénith de Dijon. Miss France Committee president Alexia Laroche-Joubert later confirmed in an interview on 1 July that the pageant would be held on 16 December 2023 in Dijon, while a press conference to officially announce the host city was held on 3 July. This marked the second time that the city had hosted Miss France, having previously hosted Miss France 2014.

On 15 July, it was confirmed that the annual overseas trip for the delegates would be to French Guiana. The delegates visited French Guiana for a variety of events, before arriving in Dijon to begin rehearsals.

=== Selection of contestants ===
The 2024 contestants were selected through regional pageants, held between June and October 2023.

The 2024 edition saw the return of Mayotte, following the appointment of a new regional director. Mayotte had previously withdrawn prior to the 2023 edition, due to the resignation of the regional director and inability to find a replacement. Saint Martin and Saint Barthélemy, which competes on a biennial basis, withdrew from the competition in line with their typical schedule of only competing every other year.

A controversy occurred regarding the Miss New Caledonia 2023 pageant, held on 9 September. During the pageant, Mathilda Lelong was crowned the winner, and following her win began her media tour throughout the region in preparation for Miss France. On 13 September, it was reported that Lelong had not actually won the pageant, and due to an error in tabulating the results had actually placed as the third runner-up, while the real winner was Emma Grousset, whom had initially been announced as just the second runner-up. Following the news of the error, the Miss France Committee confirmed its validity in a press release, while the Miss New Caledonia Committee later clarified that the error had occurred while entering the scores of the jury after the top four had been announced, and that the national Miss France Committee would decide how to proceed. On 15 September, the Miss France Committee confirmed that Grousset would be crowned Miss New Caledonia 2023 and compete at Miss France 2024. Following the incident, Lelong stated in an interview that she would resign her newly awarded title as third runner-up to Miss New Caledonia.

== Results ==
=== Placements ===
Placement	Contestant
Miss France 2024	Nord-Pas-de-Calais – Eve Gilles
1st Runner-Up	French Guiana – Audrey Ho-Wen-Tsaï
2nd Runner-Up	Provence – Adélina Blanc
3rd Runner-Up	Guadeloupe – Jalylane Maës
4th Runner-Up	Languedoc – Maxime Teissier
Top 15 (Note: The Top 15 semifinalists are listed in the order that they placed according to the official results.)	Normandy – Wissem Morel (5th Runner-Up); Tahiti – Ravahere Silloux (6th Runner-Up); Île-de-France – Elena Faliez; Pays de la Loire – Clémence Ménard; Burgundy – Luna Lacharme; Roussillon – Élise Aquilina; Côte d'Azur – Karla Bchir; Centre-Val de Loire – Emmy Gisclon; Corsica – Sandra Bak; Midi-Pyrénées – Nadine Benaboud

=== Special awards ===
Prize	Contestant
General Culture Award	Alsace – Adeline Vetter (14.2/20) (Note: The General Culture Award is given to the contestant with the highest score on the general culture exam, which tests contestants' grasp of topics such as history, politics, current events, and pop culture. Miss Alsace received the highest score of 14.2 and was thus given the award.)
Best Regional Costume	Franche-Comté – Sonia Coutant (Note: The costume was created by Celse Manfy.)
Catwalk Award	Normandy – Wissem Morel
Eloquence Award	Aquitaine – Lola Turpin
Adventurer Award	Auvergne – Oriane Mallet
Miss Academy prizes (Note: During the overseas trip in French Guiana, each day one contestant was awarded a badge to highlight a significant achievement of theirs from that day. Following the end of the trip, one of the contestants who had received the most badges received the Miss Academy Award.)
Miss Academy Award	Roussillon – Élise Aquilina
Adventurer Badge	Burgundy – Luna Lacharme; Île-de-France – Elena Faliez
Camaraderie Badge	Aquitaine – Lola Turpin
Connected Badge	(Languedoc-Roussillon) Languedoc – Maxime Teissier
Creativity Badge	Corsica – Sandra Bak
Hairstyle Badge	Champagne-Ardenne – Noa Dutitre
Hardworking Badge	French Guiana – Audrey Ho-Wen-Tsaï
Makeup Badge	Lorraine – Angéline Aron-Clauss; Roussillon – Élise Aquilina
Punctuality Badge	Franche-Comté – Sonia Coutant
Queen of the Dancefloor Badge	French Guiana – Audrey Ho-Wen-Tsaï
Spirit of the Kourou Team Badge	Roussillon – Élise Aquilina

=== Scoring ===
==== Preliminaries ====
A jury composed of partners (internal and external) of the Miss France Committee selected fifteen delegates during an interview that took place on 13 December to advance to the semifinals.

==== Top 15 ====
In the top fifteen, a 50/50 split vote between the official jury and voting public selected five delegates to advance to the top five. Each delegate was awarded an overall score of 1 to 15 from the jury and public, and the five delegates with the highest combined scores advanced to the top five. The delegates with the sixth and seventh highest combined scores were afterwards designated as the fifth and sixth runners-up, respectively, despite not advancing in the competition. In the case of a tie, the jury vote prevailed.

Contestant	Public	Jury	Total
Nord-Pas-de-Calais	13	15	28
French Guiana	15	11	26
(Languedoc-Roussillon) Languedoc	11	14	25
Guadeloupe	14	11	25
Provence	12	11	23
Normandy	9	13	22
(French Polynesia) Tahiti	8	8	16
Île-de-France	2	13	15
Pays de la Loire	10	4	14
Burgundy	5	8	13
Roussillon	6	6	12
(Nice) Côte d'Azur	7	4	11
Centre-Val de Loire	3	6	9
Corsica	4	4	8
Midi-Pyrénées	1	4	5

==== Top five ====
In the top five, a 50/50 split vote between the official jury and voting public determined which contestant was declared Miss France. Each contestant was ranked from first to fifth by the jury and public, and the two scores were combined to create a total score. In the case of a tie, the public vote prevailed.

#	Candidate	Public	Jury	Total
1	Nord-Pas-de-Calais	3	5	8
2	French Guiana	5	2	7
3	Provence	2	4	6
4	Guadeloupe	4	1	5
5	(Languedoc-Roussillon) Languedoc	1	4	5

== Pageant ==
=== Format ===
On 17 November, it was announced in a press conference that the theme for this edition of the competition would be la boîte à musique des Miss (English: The Misses' music box), with competition rounds being inspired by various genres of music.

The competition opened with an introduction performance, featuring a guest appearance from Indira Ampiot. The 30 contestants were then separated into three groups, each consisting of ten contestants, with each group taking part in an initial presentation round. The three presentation rounds were themed after 1980s pop music, salsa music, and rock music, respectively. Afterwards, the 30 contestants presented their regional costumes, created by local designers from their home regions, in a round inspired by music halls and the Moulin Rouge, featuring guest appearances from Clémence Botino, Maëva Coucke, and Amandine Petit. The 30 contestants subsequently participated in the one-piece swimsuit round, inspired by 1930s music and big band.

After that, the Top 15 were announced, followed by a tribute to Geneviève de Fontenay featuring former Miss France titleholders. The Top 15 then competed in a second swimsuit round inspired by flamenco and an evening gown round inspired by Motown music. Afterwards, the Top 5 were announced and presented their ball gowns in a round inspired by opera. After the final question round, the final results were revealed.

=== Judges ===
On 17 November, Sylvie Tellier was announced as the president of the jury, having served as the national director for Miss France from 2007 to 2022. The remainder of the judges were announced on 1 December.

- Sylvie Tellier (President of the Jury) – Miss France 2002 from Rhône-Alpes and former national director of Miss France
- Stéfi Celma – actress and singer
- Adriana Sklenaříková – model and actress
- Nolwenn Leroy – singer
- Nina Métayer – pastry chef
- Estelle Mossely – boxer
- Élodie Poux – comedian and actress

== Contestants ==
30 contestants competed:

Region	Contestant	Age (Note: Ages at the time of the pageant)	Height	Hometown	Placement	Notes
Alsace	Adeline Vetter	27	1.71 m (5 ft 7 1/2 in)	Rossfeld		
Aquitaine	Lola Turpin	19	1.73 m (5 ft 8 in)	Trélissac		Turpin is the daughter of Virginie Leglaive, Miss Berry 2001.
Auvergne	Oriane Mallet	22	1.83 m (6 ft 0 in)	Vichy		
Brittany	Noémie Le Bras	21	1.75 m (5 ft 9 in)	Le Cloître-Pleyben		
Burgundy	Luna Lacharme	18	1.75 m (5 ft 9 in)	La Chapelle-de-Guinchay	Top 15	
Centre-Val de Loire	Emmy Gisclon	22	1.76 m (5 ft 9 1/2 in)	Chambray-lès-Tours	Top 15	
Champagne-Ardenne	Noa Dutitre	22	1.70 m (5 ft 7 in)	Reims		Dutitre is the daughter of football manager Jérôme Dutitre.
Corsica	Sandra Bak	23	1.71 m (5 ft 7 1/2 in)	Ajaccio	Top 15	
(Nice) Côte d'Azur	Karla Bchir	19	1.75 m (5 ft 9 in)	Cannes	Top 15	
Franche-Comté	Sonia Coutant	24	1.72 m (5 ft 7 1/2 in)	Champagnole		
French Guiana	Audrey Ho-Wen-Tsaï	18	1.73 m (5 ft 8 in)	Kourou	1st Runner-Up	
Guadeloupe	Jalylane Maës	18	1.73 m (5 ft 8 in)	Les Abymes	3rd Runner-Up	
Île-de-France	Elena Faliez	28	1.74 m (5 ft 8 1/2 in)	Paris	Top 15	
(Languedoc-Roussillon) Languedoc	Maxime Teissier	20	1.73 m (5 ft 8 in)	Montpellier	4th Runner-Up	
Limousin	Agathe Toullieu	22	1.77 m (5 ft 9 1/2 in)	Cosnac		
Lorraine	Angéline Aron-Clauss	26	1.70 m (5 ft 7 in)	Hilbesheim		
Martinique	Chléo Modestine	21	1.75 m (5 ft 9 in)	Le Vauclin		
Mayotte	Houdayifa Chibaco	22	1.72 m (5 ft 7 1/2 in)	M'Tsangamouji		
Midi-Pyrénées	Nadine Benaboud	23	1.71 m (5 ft 7 1/2 in)	Tarbes	Top 15	
New Caledonia	Emma Grousset	21	1.80 m (5 ft 11 in)	Nouméa		Grousset is the sister of swimmer Maxime Grousset.
Nord-Pas-de-Calais	Eve Gilles	20	1.71 m (5 ft 7 1/2 in)	Quaëdypre	Miss France 2024	
Normandy	Wissem Morel	21	1.76 m (5 ft 9 1/2 in)	Rouen	Top 15	
Pays de la Loire	Clémence Ménard	26	1.74 m (5 ft 8 1/2 in)	La Séguinière	Top 15	
Picardy	Charlotte Cresson	23	1.71 m (5 ft 7 1/2 in)	Nesle		
Poitou-Charentes	Lounès Texier	19	1.73 m (5 ft 8 in)	Périgné		
Provence	Adélina Blanc	25	1.73 m (5 ft 8 in)	Eyragues	2nd Runner-Up	
Réunion	Mélanie Odules	20	1.78 m (5 ft 10 in)	Saint-Paul		
Rhône-Alpes	Alizée Bidaut	22	1.74 m (5 ft 8 1/2 in)	Saint-Genis-sur-Menthon		
Roussillon	Élise Aquilina	21	1.71 m (5 ft 7 1/2 in)	Cabestany	Top 15	
(French Polynesia) Tahiti	Ravahere Silloux	25	1.72 m (5 ft 7 1/2 in)	Papeete	Top 15	Silloux is the cousin of Tumateata Buisson, Miss Tahiti 2021.
