= Miss France 2023 =

93rd Miss France competition, national beauty pageant edition

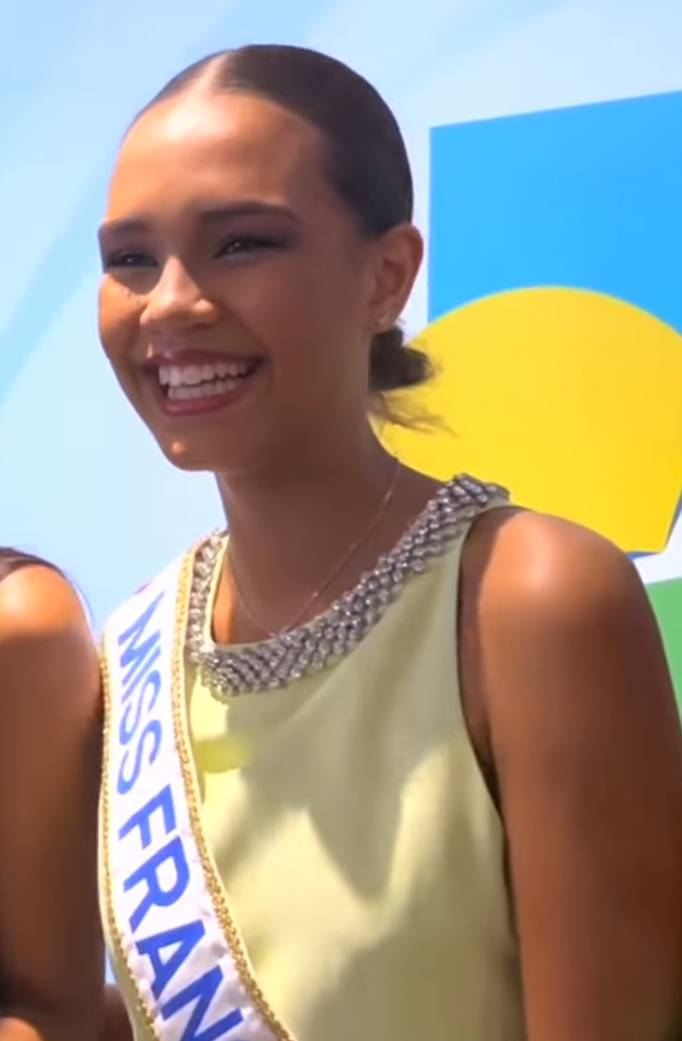
- Miss France 2023, Indira Ampiot
- Date: 17 December 2022
- Presenters: Jean-Pierre Foucault; Sylvie Tellier; Cindy Fabre
- Entertainment: Carla Bruni; Gims
- Venue: M.A.CH 36, Châteauroux, Centre-Val de Loire
- Broadcaster: TF1; MyTF1
- Entrants: 30
- Placements: 15
- Withdrawals: Languedoc-Roussillon; Mayotte
- Returns: Languedoc; Roussillon; Saint Martin and Saint Barthélemy
- Winner: Indira Ampiot; Guadeloupe
- Congeniality: Camille Sedira; Alsace
- Photogenic: Bérénice Legendre; Picardy

Miss France 2023 was the 93rd edition of the Miss France pageant, held at the M.A.CH 36 in Châteauroux, Centre-Val de Loire, France, on 17 December 2022.

Diane Leyre of Île-de-France crowned Indira Ampiot of Guadeloupe as her successor at the end of the event. The 2023 edition marked the first year that Cindy Fabre had overseen Miss France as its national director, taking over from Sylvie Tellier, who had served in the position since 2007.

== Background ==
=== Location ===
In May 2022, it was announced that Miss France 2023 was scheduled to be held at M.A.CH 36 in Châteauroux, Centre-Val de Loire in December 2022. This marked the second time the city hosted the competition, following Miss France 2018. The date of the competition was tentatively set to 17 December 2022, although there was a possibility of it being changed due to the 2022 FIFA World Cup.

Also in May 2022, it was announced that the annual overseas trip for the delegates would be to Guadeloupe. Guadeloupe was originally planned to be the location of the overseas trip for Miss France 2021, until the onset of the COVID-19 pandemic. The delegates visited Guadeloupe for a variety of events, before arriving in Châteauroux to begin rehearsals.

=== Selection of contestants ===
The 2023 edition saw the partition of Languedoc-Roussillon into the individual regions of Languedoc and Roussillon, the first time that the region sent two separate representatives since 2016. Additionally, the region of Saint Martin and Saint Barthélemy returned; Saint Martin and Saint Barthélemy last competed in 2020, and typically competes on a biennial basis. Mayotte withdrew from the competition, following the resignation of its regional director and the inability to find a replacement. This was the first year that Mayotte had been absent since its debut in 2000.

The 2023 edition also marked the first edition where women of any age; married, divorced, and widowed women; women with children; and women with tattoos or non-ear piercings were eligible to compete at Miss France.

== Results ==
=== Placements ===
| Placement | Contestant |
|---|---|
| Miss France 2023 | Guadeloupe – Indira Ampiot |
| 1st Runner-Up | Nord-Pas-de-Calais – Agathe Cauet |
| 2nd Runner-Up | Franche-Comté – Marion Navarro |
| 3rd Runner-Up | Martinique – Axelle René |
| 4th Runner-Up | Auvergne – Alissia Ladevèze |
| Top 15 (Note: The Top 15 semifinalists are listed in the order that they placed according to the official results.) | Côte d'Azur – Flavy Barla (5th Runner-Up); Lorraine – Sarah Aoutar (6th Runner-Up); Midi-Pyrénées – Florence Demortier; Picardy – Bérénice Legendre; Languedoc – Cameron Vallière; Rhône-Alpes – Esther Coutin; Pays de la Loire – Emma Guibert; Roussillon – Chiara Fontaine; Poitou-Charentes – Marine Paulais; Aquitaine – Orianne Galvez-Soto |

=== Special awards ===
| Prize | Contestant |
|---|---|
| General Culture Award | Normandy – Perrine Prunier (17.5/20) (Note: The General Culture Award is given to the contestant with the highest score on the general culture exam, which tests contestants' grasp of topics such as history, politics, current events, and pop culture. Miss Normandy received the highest score of 17.5 and was thus given the award.) |
| Best Regional Costume | (Poitou-Charentes) Pouitou-Charentes – Marine Paulais |
| Miss Congeniality | Alsace – Camille Sedira |
| Miss Photogenic | Picardy – Bérénice Legendre |
| Catwalk Award | Martinique – Axelle René |
| Eloquence Award | Franche-Comté – Marion Navarro |
| Good Manners Award | Normandy – Perrine Prunier |
| Stylist Award | Midi-Pyrénées – Florence Demortier |
| Adventurer Award | (French Polynesia) Tahiti – Herenui Tuheiava |
| Elegance Award | Burgundy – Lara Lebretton |

=== Scoring ===
==== Preliminaries ====
A jury composed of partners (internal and external) of the Miss France Committee selected fifteen delegates during an interview that took place on 14 December to advance to the semifinals.

==== Top 15 ====
In the top fifteen, a 50/50 split vote between the official jury and voting public selected five delegates to advance to the top five. Each delegate was awarded an overall score of 1 to 15 from the jury and public, and the five delegates with the highest combined scores advanced to the top five. The delegates with the sixth and seventh highest combined scores were afterwards designated as the fifth and sixth runners-up, respectively, despite not advancing in the competition. In the case of a tie, the jury vote prevailed.

| Contestant | Public | Jury | Total |
|---|---|---|---|
| Guadeloupe | 15 | 15 | 30 |
| Nord-Pas-de-Calais | 12 | 15 | 27 |
| Auvergne | 11 | 12 | 23 |
| Martinique | 14 | 9 | 23 |
| Franche-Comté | 13 | 9 | 22 |
| (Nice) Côte d'Azur | 7 | 13 | 20 |
| Lorraine | 10 | 9 | 19 |
| Midi-Pyrénées | 6 | 12 | 18 |
| Picardy | 8 | 6 | 14 |
| (Languedoc-Roussillon) Languedoc | 1 | 12 | 13 |
| Rhône-Alpes | 5 | 6 | 11 |
| Pays de la Loire | 9 | 2 | 11 |
| Roussillon | 4 | 6 | 10 |
| Poitou-Charentes | 3 | 6 | 9 |
| Aquitaine | 2 | 2 | 4 |

==== Top five ====
In the top five, a 50/50 split vote between the official jury and voting public determined which contestant was declared Miss France. This was the third year that voting was conducted this way, following a rule change in the 2021 edition. Each contestant was ranked from first to fifth by the jury and public, and the two scores were combined to create a total score. In the case of a tie, the public vote prevailed.

| # | Candidate | Public | Jury | Total |
|---|---|---|---|---|
| 1 | Guadeloupe | 5 | 5 | 10 |
| 2 | Nord-Pas-de-Calais | 4 | 4 | 8 |
| 3 | Franche-Comté | 2 | 3 | 5 |
| 4 | Martinique | 3 | 1 | 4 |
| 5 | Auvergne | 1 | 2 | 3 |

== Pageant ==
=== Format ===
On 18 November, it was announced in a press conference that the theme for this edition of the competition would be cinéma des Miss (English: Cinema of the Misses), with competition rounds being inspired by various films.

The competition opened with an introduction themed after Titanic, with a guest appearance from Diane Leyre. The 30 contestants were initially separated into three groups, each consisting of ten contestants, with each group taking part in an initial presentation round. The three presentation rounds were themed after Rocketman, Harry Potter, and The Avengers, respectively. Afterwards, the 30 contestants presented their regional costumes, created by local designers from their home regions, in a round inspired by Alice in Wonderland. The 30 contestants subsequently participated in the one-piece swimsuit round, inspired by Amélie.

After that, the Top 15 were announced in a round inspired by the Academy Awards, and they then competed in a second swimsuit round inspired by A View to a Kill. The Top 15 later appeared with Carla Bruni and Gims, for a performance of their song "Demain." Afterwards, the Top 5 were announced and presented their evening gowns in a round inspired by Skyfall. After the final question round, the Top 5 participated in their final presentation round, inspired by Maleficent, also featuring a guest appearance from Leyre, before the final results were revealed.

=== Judges ===
The judges were announced on 1 December 2022.

- Francis Huster (President of the Jury) – actor and director
- Clarisse Agbegnenou – judoka
- Dominique Besnehard – actor and film producer
- Arnaud Ducret – actor and comedian
- Kendji Girac – singer
- Bérengère Krief – actress and comedian
- Marine Lorphelin – Miss France 2013 from Burgundy

Camille Lellouche was originally scheduled to serve as a judge, but resigned on 16 December for personal reasons, and was replaced by Krief.

== Contestants ==
The 30 contestants were:

| Region | Delegate | Age (Note: Ages at the time of the pageant) | Height | Hometown | Placement | Notes |
|---|---|---|---|---|---|---|
| Alsace | Camille Sedira | 21 | 1.76 m (5 ft 9 1/2 in) | Bischoffsheim | | |
| Aquitaine | Orianne Galvez-Soto | 23 | 1.73 m (5 ft 8 in) | Lembras | Top 15 | |
| Auvergne | Alissia Ladevèze | 21 | 1.84 m (6 ft 1/2 in) | Vichy | 4th Runner-Up | |
| Brittany | Enora Moal | 21 | 1.71 m (5 ft 7 1/2 in) | Guipavas | | |
| Burgundy | Lara Lebretton | 23 | 1.76 m (5 ft 9 1/2 in) | Givry | | |
| Centre-Val de Loire | Coraline Lerasle | 23 | 1.77 m (5 ft 9 1/2 in) | Ballan-Miré | | |
| Champagne-Ardenne | Solène Scholer | 20 | 1.80 m (5 ft 11 in) | Châlons-en-Champagne | | |
| Corsica | Orianne Méloni | 22 | 1.83 m (6 ft 0 in) | Ajaccio | | |
| (Nice) Côte d'Azur | Flavy Barla | 19 | 1.72 m (5 ft 7 1/2 in) | Nice | Top 15 | |
| Franche-Comté | Marion Navarro | 19 | 1.73 m (5 ft 8 in) | Baume-les-Dames | 2nd Runner-Up | |
| French Guiana | Shaïna Robin | 21 | 1.74 m (5 ft 8 1/2 in) | Kourou | | |
| Guadeloupe | Indira Ampiot | 18 | 1.77 m (5 ft 9 1/2 in) | Basse-Terre | Miss France 2023 | |
| Île-de-France | Adèle Bonnamour | 18 | 1.84 m (6 ft 1/2 in) | Paris | | |
| (Languedoc-Roussillon) Languedoc | Cameron Vallière | 23 | 1.74 m (5 ft 8 1/2 in) | Nîmes | Top 15 | |
| Limousin | Salomé Maud | 23 | 1.74 m (5 ft 8 1/2 in) | Limoges | | |
| Lorraine | Sarah Aoutar | 26 | 1.73 m (5 ft 8 in) | Thionville | Top 15 | |
| Martinique | Axelle René | 21 | 1.77 m (5 ft 9 1/2 in) | Le Robert | 3rd Runner-Up | |
| Midi-Pyrénées | Florence Demortier | 23 | 1.71 m (5 ft 7 1/2 in) | Portet-sur-Garonne | Top 15 | |
| New Caledonia | Océane Le Goff | 26 | 1.72 m (5 ft 7 1/2 in) | Nouméa | | |
| Nord-Pas-de-Calais | Agathe Cauet | 24 | 1.79 m (5 ft 10 1/2 in) | Lille | 1st Runner-Up | |
| Normandy | Perrine Prunier | 23 | 1.71 m (5 ft 7 1/2 in) | Caen | | |
| Pays de la Loire | Emma Guibert | 20 | 1.76 m (5 ft 9 1/2 in) | Poiroux | Top 15 | |
| Picardy | Bérénice Legendre | 26 | 1.71 m (5 ft 7 1/2 in) | Amiens | Top 15 | |
| Poitou-Charentes | Marine Paulais | 20 | 1.74 m (5 ft 8 1/2 in) | Bellevigne | Top 15 | |
| Provence | Chana Goyons | 18 | 1.80 m (5 ft 11 in) | Gassin | | |
| Réunion | Marion Marimoutou | 18 | 1.72 m (5 ft 7 1/2 in) | Saint-André | | |
| Rhône-Alpes | Esther Coutin | 24 | 1.71 m (5 ft 7 1/2 in) | Passy | Top 15 | |
| Roussillon | Chiara Fontaine | 20 | 1.74 m (5 ft 8 1/2 in) | Corneilla-del-Vercol | Top 15 | |
| Saint Martin and Saint Barthélemy | Inès Tessier | 20 | 1.71 m (5 ft 7 1/2 in) | Gustavia | | |
| (French Polynesia) Tahiti | Herenui Tuheiava | 24 | 1.77 m (5 ft 9 1/2 in) | Pirae | | |
