= Miss Aquitaine =

French beauty contest

- Type: Beauty pageant
- Headquarters: Aquitaine, France
- Members: Miss France
- Official language: French
- Regional director: Éric Laurens
- Website: missaquitaine.fr

Miss Aquitaine is a French beauty pageant which selects a representative for the Miss France national competition from the region of Aquitaine. Women representing the region under various different titles have competed at Miss France since 1920, although the Miss Aquitaine title was not used regularly until 1985.

The current Miss Aquitaine is Solène Videau, who was crowned Miss Aquitaine 2026 on 15 May 2026. Seven women from Aquitaine have been crowned Miss France:

- Agnès Souret, who was crowned Miss France 1920
- Jeanne Juillia, who was crowned Miss France 1931, competing as Miss Gascony
- Josiane Pouy, who was crowned Miss France 1952, competing as Miss Côte d'Argent
- Frédérique Leroy, who was crowned Miss France 1983, competing as Miss Bordeaux, following the dethroning of the original winner
- Peggy Zlotkowski, who was crowned Miss France 1989
- Gaëlle Voiry, who was crowned Miss France 1990
- Mélody Vilbert, who was crowned Miss France 1995

== Results summary ==
- Miss France: Agnès Souret (1919); Jeanne Juillia (1930; Miss Gascony); Josiane Pouy (1951; Miss Côte d'Argent); Peggy Zlotkowski (1988); Gaëlle Voiry (1989); Mélody Vilbert (1994)
- 1st Runner-Up: Christine Schmidt (1972; Miss Arcachon); Martine Calzavara (1974; Miss Gascony); Frédérique Leroy (1982; Miss Bordeaux; later Miss France)
- 2nd Runner-Up: Marie-Thérèse Thiel (1970; Miss Gascony); Christine Schmidt (1971; Miss Arcachon); Martine Calzavara (1973; Miss Lot-et-Garonne); Bénédicte Delmas (1991; Miss Côte Basque)
- 3rd Runner-Up: Colette Dezanet (1952; Miss Côte d'Argent); Sylvie Tardy (1989; Miss Périgord); Malaurie Eugénie (2014)
- 4th Runner-Up: Pierrette Descrambes (1960; Miss Guyenne); Thérèse Trady (1961); Josiane Klaasen (1965; Miss Bordeaux); Chantal Braham (1977; Miss Médoc); Maylis Ondicola (1996); Élodie Pleumeckers (2002); Lyse Ruchat (2006)
- 5th Runner-Up: Céline Reiter (2001); Gennifer Demey (2015); Cassandra Jullia (2017); Ambre Andrieu (2021)
- 6th Runner-Up: Christiane Campello (1970); Anne-Sophie Vigno (1996; Miss Béarn); Laura Marque (2024)
- Top 12/Top 15: Nathalie Eyogo (1986); Emmanuelle Mérinot (1990); Renée-Noëlle Chassagne (1992; Miss Périgord); Axelle Bonnemaison (2016); Carla Bonesso (2018); Justine Delmas (2019); Leïla Veslard (2020); Orianne Galvez-Soto (2022)

== Gallery ==
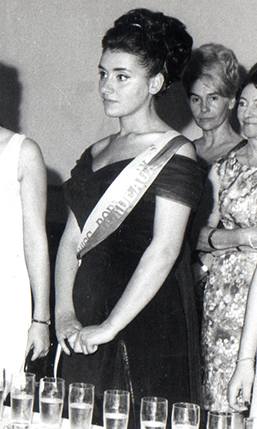
Miss Bordeaux 1965
Josiane Klaasen

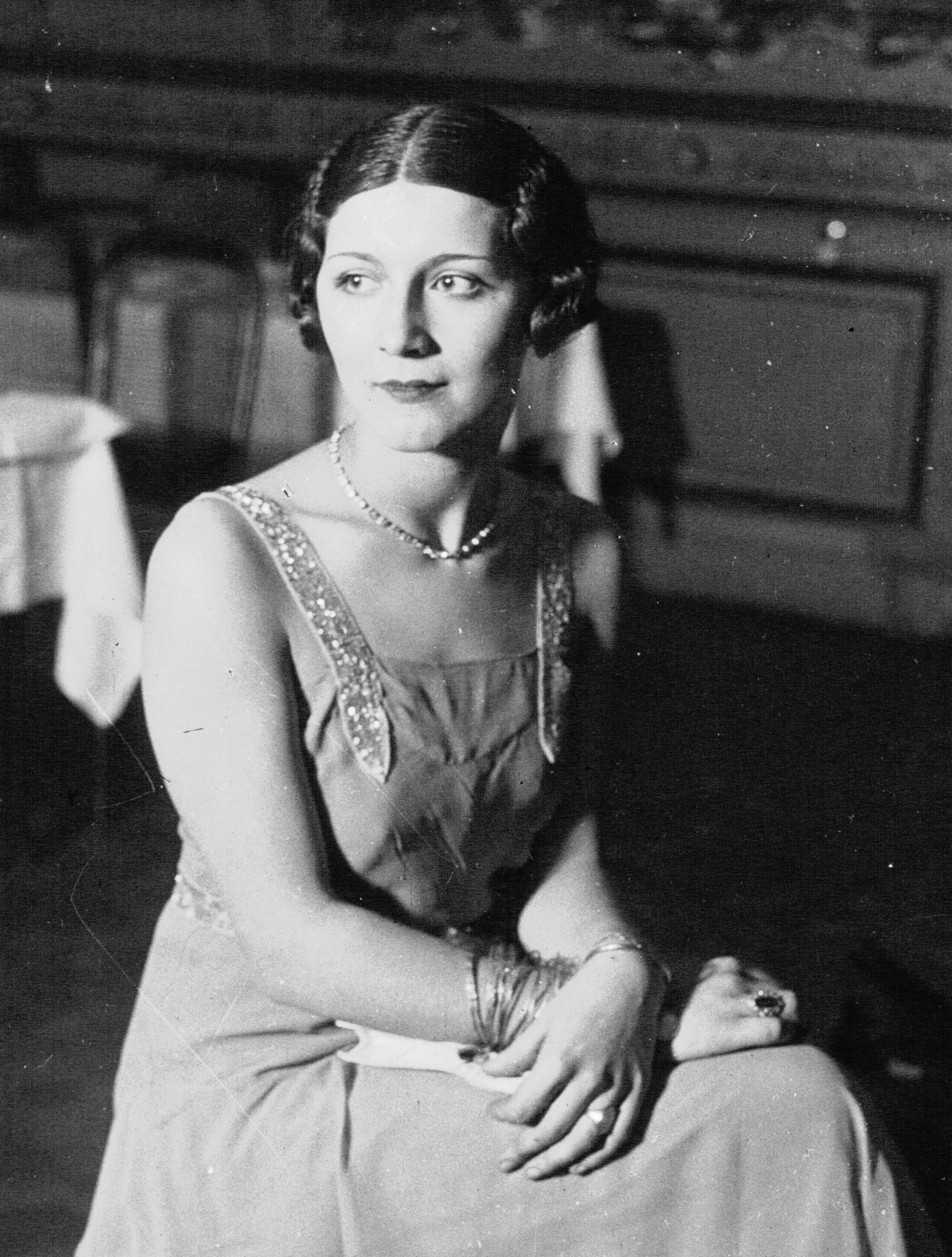
Miss Gascony 1930 and Miss France 1931
Jeanne Juillia

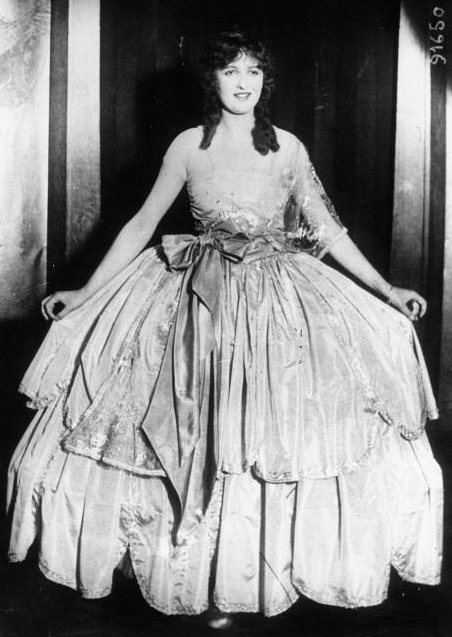
Miss Aquitaine 1919 and Miss France 1920
Agnès Souret

== Titleholders ==
Year	Name	Age (Note: Ages at the time of Miss France)	Height	Hometown	Miss France placement	Notes
2026	Solène Videau	22	1.73 m (5 ft 8 in)	Mérignac	TBD	
2025	Aïnhoa Lahitete	19	1.73 m (5 ft 8 in)	Hendaye		Lahitete was dethroned on 9 December 2025, after a private video leaked of her and Miss Provence 2025, Julie Zitouni, making disparaging comments about other contestants for Miss France 2026.
2024	Laura Marque	25	1.75 m (5 ft 9 in)	Arcachon	Top 15 (6th Runner-Up)	
2023	Lola Turpin	19	1.73 m (5 ft 8 in)	Trélissac		Turpin is the daughter of Virginie Leglaive, Miss Berry 2001.
2022	Orianne Galvez-Soto	23	1.73 m (5 ft 8 in)	Lembras	Top 15	
2021	Ambre Andrieu	22	1.78 m (5 ft 10 in)	Bordeaux	Top 15 (5th Runner-Up)	
2020	Leïla Veslard	18	1.74 m (5 ft 8 1/2 in)	Saint-Mesmin	Top 15	
2019	Justine Delmas	21	1.78 m (5 ft 10 in)	Saint-Sauveur	Top 15	
2018	Carla Bonesso	20	1.76 m (5 ft 9 1/2 in)	Dax	Top 12	
2017	Cassandra Jullia	18	1.72 m (5 ft 7 1/2 in)	Orthevielle	Top 12 (5th Runner-Up)	
2016	Axelle Bonnemaison	19	1.76 m (5 ft 9 1/2 in)	Castelculier	Top 12	
2015	Gennifer Demey	22	1.71 m (5 ft 7 1/2 in)	Lormont	Top 12 (5th Runner-Up)	
2014	Malaurie Eugénie	20	1.76 m (5 ft 9 1/2 in)	Biganos	3rd Runner-Up	
2013	Camille Gafa	22	1.77 m (5 ft 9 1/2 in)	Bordeaux		
2012	Amélie Rigodanzo	20	1.77 m (5 ft 9 1/2 in)	Seyches		
2011	Claire Zengerlin	20	1.74 m (5 ft 8 1/2 in)	Douzillac		Zengerlin is the sister of Aurélie Zengerlin, Miss Aquitaine 2009.
2010	Clémence Thill	20	1.74 m (5 ft 8 1/2 in)	Agen		
2009	Aurélie Zengerlin	21	1.77 m (5 ft 9 1/2 in)	Douzillac		Zengerlin is the sister of Claire Zengerlin, Miss Aquitaine 2011.
2008	Anna Nieto	20	1.76 m (5 ft 9 1/2 in)	Sarlat-la-Canéda		
2007	Caroline Martin	20	1.72 m (5 ft 7 1/2 in)	Pau		
2006	Lyse Ruchat	20	1.73 m (5 ft 8 in)	Villenave-d'Ornon	4th Runner-Up	
2005	Audrey Castet	18	1.82 m (5 ft 11 1/2 in)	Belin-Béliet		Castet was dethroned in January 2006, after participating in Miss France, and replaced by Pontet, her first runner-up.
2005	Karine Pontet				Did not compete	Castet was dethroned in January 2006, after participating in Miss France, and replaced by Pontet, her first runner-up.
2002	Élodie Pleumeckers				4th Runner-Up	
2001	Céline Reiter			Le Passage	Top 12 (5th Runner-Up)	
2000	Laëtitia Cozza			Puch-d'Agenais		
1999	Sonia Benlloch			Port-Sainte-Marie		
1998	Stéphanie Amano	18	1.82 m (5 ft 11 1/2 in)	Sainte-Marthe		
1997	Céline Giusti					
1996	Maylis Ondicola			Lugaignac	4th Runner-Up	
1995	Christelle Riou	18	1.75 m (5 ft 9 in)			
1994	Mélody Vilbert	18		Bordeaux	Miss France 1995	Competed at Miss International 1995
1993	Valérie Amblard					
1992	Karine Zava					
1991	Sandrine Ducher	21		Saint-Médard-en-Jalles		
1990	Emmanuelle Mérinot				Top 12	
1989	Gaëlle Voiry	20		Bordeaux	Miss France 1990	Competed at Miss World 1990
1988	Peggy Zlotkowski	16	1.70 m (5 ft 7 in)	Monflanquin	Miss France 1989	Competed at Miss World 1989
1987	Myriam Saint-Espès	18	1.68 m (5 ft 6 in)	Marmande		
1986	Nathalie Eyogo			Mongauzy	Top 12	
1985	Véronique Marchi			Clairac		
1978	Isabelle Olivier					Olivier was crowned Miss Aquitaine two years in a row.
1977	Isabelle Olivier					Olivier was crowned Miss Aquitaine two years in a row.
1976	Muriel Meyer					
1970	Christiane Campello				6th Runner-Up	
1964	Colette Sainsard					
1961	Thérèse Trady				4th Runner-Up	
1919	Agnès Souret	17		Espelette	Miss France 1920	

=== Miss Arcachon ===
In 1964 and the 1970s, the department of Gironde competed separately under the title Miss Arcachon.

Year	Name	Age	Height	Hometown	Miss France placement	Notes
1978	Catherine Mongeois					
1977	Sophie Chazeau					
1976	Véronique Garcia					
1973	Brigitte Flayac			Arcachon	5th Runner-Up	Competed at Miss Universe 1974.
1972	Christine Schmidt				1st Runner-Up	Schmidt was crowned Miss Arcachon two years in a row.
1971	Christine Schmidt				2nd Runner-Up	Schmidt was crowned Miss Arcachon two years in a row.
1970	Joëlle Placaud					
1964	Josette Venton					

=== Miss Armagnac ===
In 1970, the departments of Gers and Landes competed separately under the titles Miss Armagnac. Women from Gers were eligible to compete, due to the department's historical ties to Armagnac, despite being located in Midi-Pyrénées.

Year	Name	Age	Height	Hometown	Miss France placement	Notes
1970	Jacqueline Stringher					

=== Miss Béarn ===
In 1996, 2003, 2004, and 2009, the departments of Landes and Pyrénées-Atlantiques competed separately under the titles Miss Béarn (1996), Miss Bigorre-Béarn (2003; 2004), and Miss Béarn-Gascogne (2009). In 2003 and 2004, women from Hautes-Pyrénées were also eligible to compete, due to the department's historical ties to Bigorre, despite being located in Midi-Pyrénées.

Year	Name	Age	Height	Hometown	Miss France placement	Notes
2009	Marine Bories	20	1.72 m (5 ft 7 1/2 in)	Léon		
2004	Myriam Barre	18	1.72 m (5 ft 7 1/2 in)	Tarbes		
2003	Marianne Laher			Tarbes		
1996	Anne-Sophie Vigno		1.75 m (5 ft 9 in)	Idron	Top 12 (6th Runner-Up)	

=== Miss Bordeaux ===
From the 1960s to 1980s, the department of Gironde competed separately under the title Miss Bordeaux. In 1977 and 1978, the title was called Miss Grand-Bordeaux.

Year	Name	Age	Height	Hometown	Miss France placement	Notes
1988	Sandrine Scherrer	18	1.76 m (5 ft 9 1/2 in)		Did not compete	
1982	Frédérique Leroy	18		Bordeaux	1st Runner-Up (later Miss France 1983)	Leroy was originally the first runner-up, but took over as Miss France 1983 after the original winner was dethroned for participating in an erotic photoshoot. Competed at Miss Universe 1983 Competed at Miss World 1983
1978	Martine Lajus					Lajus was crowned Miss Bordeaux three years in a row.
1977	Martine Lajus					Lajus was crowned Miss Bordeaux three years in a row.
1976	Martine Lajus					Lajus was crowned Miss Bordeaux three years in a row.
1970	Marie-Hélène Agam					
1965	Josiane Klaasen	22			4th Runner-Up	

=== Miss Côte Basque ===
From the 1960s to 1990s, the department of Pyrénées-Atlantiques competed separately under the title Miss Côte Basque.

Year	Name	Age	Height	Hometown	Miss France placement	Notes
1998	Sandrine Vacchiero	20	1.70 m (5 ft 7 in)			
1991	Bénédicte Delmas	19		Bayonne	2nd Runner-Up	Competed at Miss International 1992
1989	Marie de Epalza					
1988	Anne Féron	19	1.71 m (5 ft 7 1/2 in)			
1970	Paulette Pemartin					
1962	Catherine Feodorove					

=== Miss Côte d'Argent ===
In 1951, 1952, and 1976, the departments of Gironde, Landes, and Pyrénées-Atlantiques competed separately under the title Miss Côte d'Argent. In 1979, a titleholder was crowned under the title Miss Côte-Sud-des-Landes.

Year	Name	Age	Height	Hometown	Miss France placement	Notes
1979	Brigitte Levert					
1976	Danièle Heret					
1952	Colette Dezanet				3rd Runner-Up	
1951	Josiane Pouy	18		Nérac	Miss France 1952	

=== Miss Entre-Deux-Mers ===
In 1976, the department of Gironde competed separately under the title Miss Entre-Deux-Mers.

Year	Name	Age	Height	Hometown	Miss France placement	Notes
1976	Francine Marchiado					

=== Miss Gascony ===
In 1930 and from the 1970s to 2000s, Aquitaine and Midi-Pyrénées crowned a representative under the title Miss Gascony (French: Miss Gascogne), to represent the historic region of Gascony, located between both Aquitaine and Midi-Pyrénées. Representatives crowned Miss Gascony who hailed from Midi-Pyrénées are included in the Miss Midi-Pyrénées article.

Year	Name	Age	Height	Hometown	Miss France placement	Notes
2001	Laurie Dayres			Mont-de-Marsan		
2000	Gaëlle Laplace			Capbreton		
1999	Julie Vieira	19	1.71 m (5 ft 7 1/2 in)	Mont-de-Marsan		
1998	Sandra Foutel	22	1.75 m (5 ft 9 in)	Labenne		
1997	Corinne Plaza	18	1.71 m (5 ft 7 1/2 in)	Soustons		
1996	Sabine Alves De Puga					
1995	Sandrine Dubouil					
1994	Caroline Laffont					
1993	Karine Mathieu					
1992	Myriam Amouroux					
1991	Christine Beau					
1990	Sylvie Chatel			Villeneuve-sur-Lot		
1989	Claudia Compeyrot					
1988	Stéphanie Trupin					
1987	Coralie Nogueras					
1985	Isabelle Monbec			Agen		
1978	Patricia Gleyze					
1976	Marie-Noëlle Dardit					
1974	Martine Calzavara	19		Casteljaloux	1st Runner-Up	Calzavara was crowned Miss Lot-et-Garonne in 1973, and Miss Gascony in 1974.
1970	Marie-Thérèse Thiel				2nd Runner-Up	
1930	Jeanne Juillia	20		Villeneuve-sur-Lot	Miss France 1931	

=== Miss Guyenne ===
In 1960, the departments of Dordogne and Gironde competed separately under the title Miss Guyenne. In 2003 and 2004, the title was known as Miss Aquitaine-Guyenne.

Year	Name	Age	Height	Hometown	Miss France placement	Notes
2004	Annaïck Manella	18	1.72 m (5 ft 7 1/2 in)	Périgueux		
2003	Nathalie Labbé					
1960	Pierrette Descrambes	21	1.72 m (5 ft 7 1/2 in)		4th Runner-Up	

=== Miss Landes ===
In 1976, the department of Landes crowned its own representative for Miss France.

Year	Name	Age	Height	Hometown	Miss France placement	Notes
1976	Rose-Marie Domenech					

=== Miss Lot-et-Garonne ===
In 1973, the department of Lot-et-Garonne crowned its own representative for Miss France. In 1952 and 1970, a representative was crowned under the title Miss Agen, while a representative was crowned under the title Miss Roquefort in 1972.

Year	Name	Age	Height	Hometown	Miss France placement	Notes
1973	Martine Calzavara		1.70 m (5 ft 7 in)	Casteljaloux	2nd Runner-Up	Calzavara was crowned Miss Lot-et-Garonne in 1973, and Miss Gascony in 1974.
1972	Nadine Guerrero	17				
1970	Anne-Marie Archiapati					
1952	Jacqueline Kosiel					

=== Miss Médoc ===
In 1976, 1977, 1986, and 1987, the department of Gironde competed separately under the title Miss Médoc.

Year	Name	Age	Height	Hometown	Miss France placement	Notes
1987	Christelle Bastard					
1986	Valérie Bourguignon					
1977	Chantal Braham				4th Runner-Up	
1976	Claudine Duputh					

=== Miss Monbazillac ===
In 1976 and 1978, the department of Dordogne competed separately under the title Miss Monbazillac. In 1977, the title was called Miss Monbazillac-Périgord.

Year	Name	Age	Height	Hometown	Miss France placement	Notes
1978	Martine Pauliac					
1977	Monique Astan					
1976	Martine Tallet					

=== Miss Périgord ===
From the 1970s to 2000s, the department of Dordogne competed separately under the title Miss Périgord. In 1983 and 1984, the title was known as Miss Périgord-Agenais.

Year	Name	Age	Height	Hometown	Miss France placement	Notes
2005	Murielle Castaing	19	1.72 m (5 ft 7 1/2 in)	Sigoulès		
2004	Sonia Chartier					
2003	Jennifer Leloup					
2002	Aurore Vlamynck			Saint-Mayme-de-Péreyrol		
2001	Céline Fourestié			Saint-Sylvestre-sur-Lot		
2000	Aurélie Prével			La Force		
1999	Stéphanie Lopéra			Périgueux		
1998	Céline Barbaray			Ginestet		
1997	Julie Sambard					
1996	Caren Claret					
1995	Murielle Chamouleau	20		Nontron		
1994	Sophie Danos	18				
1993	Marlène Dazenière			Coulounieix-Chamiers		
1992	Renée-Noëlle Chassagne				Top 12	
1991	Laurence Bazin					
1990	Nelly Gauthier					
1989	Sylvie Tardy			Rouffignac-de-Sigoulès	3rd Runner-Up	
1987	Catherine Yzerd					
1986	Marie-Hélène Hallez					
1985	Sandrine Puybonnieux					
1984	Véronique Petit	18	1.70 m (5 ft 7 in)			
1983	Corinne Rouby	17		Marmande		
1978	Corinne Bernatta					

=== Miss Soulac ===
In 1979, the department of Gironde competed separately under the title Miss Soulac.

Year	Name	Age	Height	Hometown	Miss France placement	Notes
1979	Brigitte Duchemin					
