= Miss Midi-Pyrénées =

French beauty contest

- Type: Beauty pageant
- Headquarters: Midi-Pyrénées, France
- Members: Miss France
- Official language: French
- Regional director: Karine Daries
- Website: www.miss-midi-pyrenees.fr

Miss Midi-Pyrénées is a French beauty pageant which selects a representative for the Miss France national competition from the region of Midi-Pyrénées. Women representing the region under various different titles have competed at Miss France since 1968, although the Miss Midi-Pyrénées title was not used regularly until 2010.

The current Miss Midi-Pyrénées is Carla Rachail, who was crowned Miss Midi-Pyrénées 2026 on 5 September 2026. One woman from Midi-Pyrénées has been crowned Miss France:

- Chloé Mortaud, who was crowned Miss France 2009, competing as Miss Albigeois Midi-Pyrénées

== Results summary ==
- Miss France: Chloé Mortaud (2008; Miss Albigeois Midi-Pyrénées)
- 1st Runner-Up: Marie Borg (1996; Miss Toulouse Midi-Pyrénées)
- 2nd Runner-Up: Marie-Thérèse Thiel (1970; Miss Gascony); Nadia Poullain (1983; Miss Rouergue); Laura Fasquel (2005; Miss Albigeois Midi-Toulousain)
- 3rd Runner-Up: Marie-France Parnot (1983; Miss Quercy); Carole Moretto (1993; Miss Albigeois)
- 4th Runner-Up: Violette Pena (1968; Miss Toulouse-Languedoc); Céline Cassagnes (1990); Nathalie Ample (2009; Miss Quercy-Rouergue)
- 5th Runner-Up: Émeline Laganthe (1989); Carine Bedoya (2000); Christel Leyenberger (2002; Miss Quercy-Rouergue)
- Top 12/Top 15: Brigitte Herrera (1987); Christelle Rocagel (1987; Miss Rouergue); Céline Duthil (1993; Miss Toulouse Midi-Pyrénées); Stéphanie Kaysen (1994; Miss Toulouse); Marie-Alexie Bazerque (2005); Lisa Fernandez (2005; Miss Quercy-Rouergue); Eurydice Rigal (2007; Miss Albigeois Midi-Toulousain); Laura Madelain (2011); Florence Demortier (2022); Nadine Benaboud (2023); Olivia Sirena (2024)

== Gallery ==
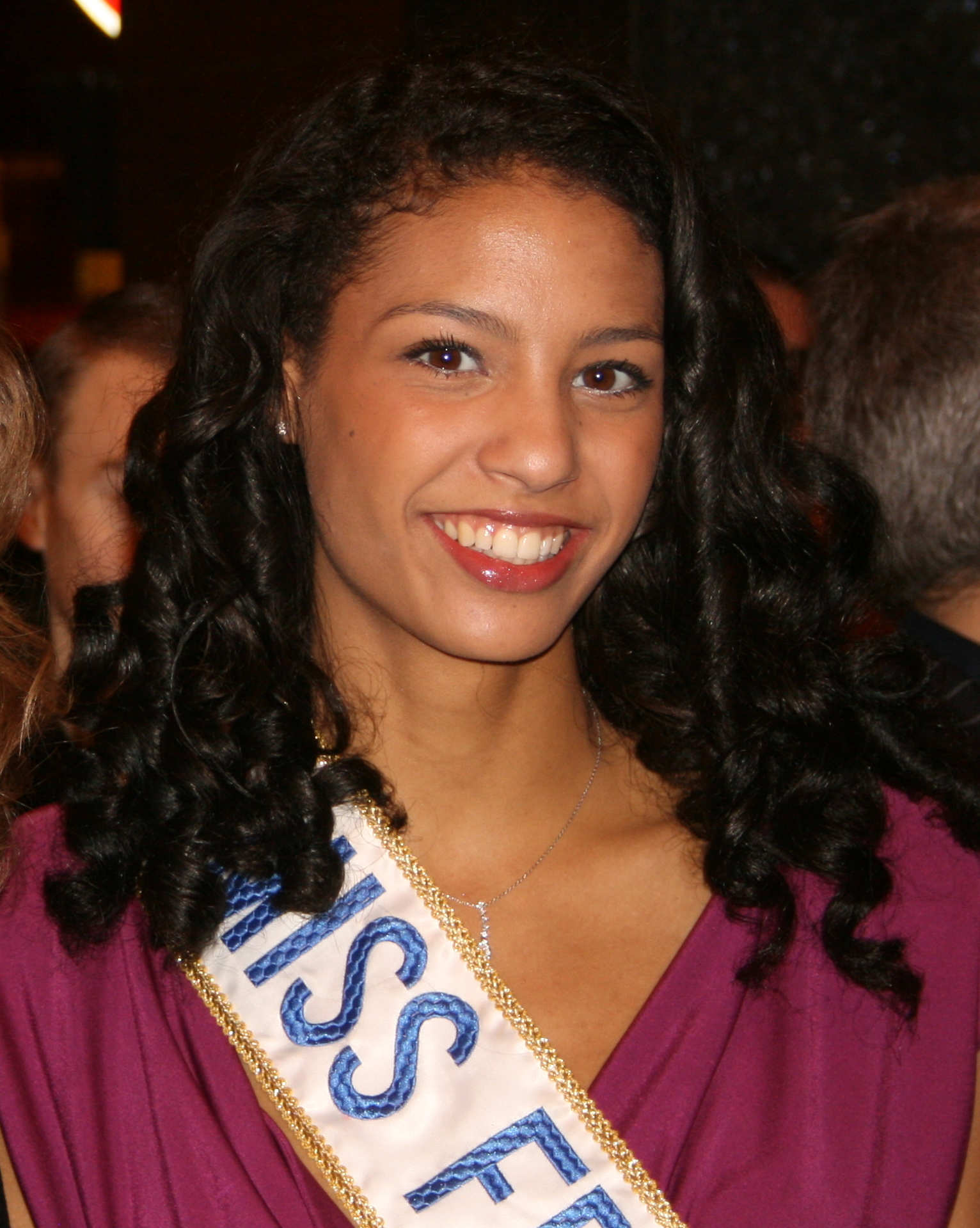
Miss Albigeois Midi-Pyrénées 2008 and Miss France 2009
Chloé Mortaud

== Titleholders ==
Year	Name	Age (Note: Ages at the time of Miss France)	Height	Hometown	Miss France placement	Notes
2026	Carla Rachail	23	1.74 m (5 ft 8 1/2 in)	Toulouse	TBD	
2025	Léa Chabrel	24	1.70 m (5 ft 7 in)	Saint-Jean-de-Verges		
2024	Olivia Sirena	23	1.78 m (5 ft 10 in)	Balma	Top 15	
2023	Nadine Benaboud	23	1.71 m (5 ft 7 1/2 in)	Tarbes	Top 15	
2022	Florence Demortier	23	1.71 m (5 ft 7 1/2 in)	Portet-sur-Garonne	Top 15	
2021	Hannah Friconnet	22	1.70 m (5 ft 7 in)	Labruguière		
2020	Emma Arrebot-Natou	19	1.78 m (5 ft 10 in)	Tournefeuille		
2019	Andréa Magalhaes	21	1.73 m (5 ft 8 in)	Viozan		
2018	Axelle Breil	20	1.80 m (5 ft 11 in)	Toulouse		
2017	Anaïs Dufillo-Medellel	19	1.70 m (5 ft 7 in)	Auch		
2016	Virginie Guillin	23	1.78 m (5 ft 10 in)	Lavelanet		
2015	Emily Segouffin	24	1.73 m (5 ft 8 in)	Chélan		
2014	Laura Pelos	24	1.80 m (5 ft 11 in)	Urdens		
2013	Audrey Bernès	20	1.81 m (5 ft 11 1/2 in)	Toulouse		
2012	Célia Guermoudj	22	1.70 m (5 ft 7 in)	Toulouse		
2011	Laura Madelain	18	1.77 m (5 ft 9 1/2 in)	Figeac	Top 12	
2010	Alison Martin	24	1.73 m (5 ft 8 in)	Tournefeuille		
2002	Cécile Monteil	19	1.76 m (5 ft 9 1/2 in)	Castanet-Tolosan		
2001	Nadia Gillet			Colomiers		
2000	Carine Bedoya			L'Union	Top 12 (5th Runner-Up)	
1992	Stéphanie Viguier			Villefranche-de-Rouergue		
1991	Catherine Bourlier			Villefranche-de-Rouergue		
1990	Céline Cassagnes				4th Runner-Up	
1989	Émeline Laganthe				Top 12 (5th Runner-Up)	
1987	Brigitte Herrera				Top 12	

=== Miss Albigeois ===
From 1993 to 2002, the department of Tarn competed separately under the title Miss Albigeois.

Year	Name	Age	Height	Hometown	Miss France placement	Notes
2002	Emlyne Bounay	18	1.76 m (5 ft 9 1/2 in)	Verfeil		
2001	Nadia Guerraoui		1.75 m (5 ft 9 in)	Aiguefonde		
2000	Émilie Alberge			Saint-Juéry		
1999	Karine Lherm	19	1.71 m (5 ft 7 1/2 in)	Cestayrols		
1998	Virginie Figueiredo	18	1.74 m (5 ft 8 1/2 in)			
1997	Aurélie Bernard	19	1.76 m (5 ft 9 1/2 in)			
1996	Elsa Mazzia					
1995	Audrey Mas					
1994	Carole Venien					
1993	Carole Moretto	18		Albi	3rd Runner-Up	

=== Miss Albigeois Midi-Pyrénées ===
In 2008 and 2009, the region crowned a representative under the title Miss Albigeois Midi-Pyrénées.

Year	Name	Age	Height	Hometown	Miss France placement	Notes
2009	Laura Faroult	21	1.73 m (5 ft 8 in)	Lavelanet		
2008	Chloé Mortaud	19	1.80 m (5 ft 11 in)	Bénac	Miss France 2009	Top 7 at Miss World 2009 Top 10 at Miss Universe 2009

=== Miss Albigeois Midi-Toulousain ===
From 2003 to 2007, the region crowned a representative under the title Miss Albigeois Midi-Toulousain.

Year	Name	Age	Height	Hometown	Miss France placement	Notes
2007	Eurydice Rigal	20	1.80 m (5 ft 11 in)	Saint-Lieux-lès-Lavaur	Top 12	
2006	Ellyn Bermejo	22	1.77 m (5 ft 9 1/2 in)	Montans		
2005	Laura Fasquel	19	1.74 m (5 ft 8 1/2 in)	Lapeyrouse-Fossat	2nd Runner-Up	Competed at Miss World 2006
2004	Aurélie Blazy	21	1.80 m (5 ft 11 in)	Vèbre		
2003	Stéphanie Baldacchino			Toulouse		

=== Miss Armagnac ===
In 1978, the department of Gers competed separately under the title Miss Armagnac.

Year	Name	Age	Height	Hometown	Miss France placement	Notes
1978	Martine Remer					

=== Miss Bigorre-Béarn ===
In 2003 and 2004, the department of Hautes-Pyrénées competed separately under the title Miss Bigorre-Béare.

Year	Name	Age	Height	Hometown	Miss France placement	Notes
2004	Myriam Barre	18	1.72 m (5 ft 7 1/2 in)	Tarbes		
2003	Marianne Laher			Tarbes		

=== Miss Comminges ===
In 1964 and from 1993 to 2002, the department of Haute-Garonne competed separately under the title Miss Comminges.

Year	Name	Age	Height	Hometown	Miss France placement	Notes
2002	Mandy Garcia	20		Rieumes		
2001	Candice Jalran			Saint-Gaudens		
2000	Lætitia Arnaune			Barbazan		
1999	Lucie Portet	19	1.84 m (6 ft 1/2 in)	Lavelanet-de-Comminges		
1998	Roxane Delbes	21	1.78 m (5 ft 10 in)	Montréjeau		
1997	Valérie Danoravo	23	1.71 m (5 ft 7 1/2 in)	Saint-Gaudens		
1996	Carine Vincent					
1995	Stéphanie Castex			Bagnères-de-Luchon		
1994	Marjorie Leroux					
1993	Audrey Ptack			Saint-Gaudens		

=== Miss Comminges Pyrénées ===
From 2003 to 2007, the region crowned a representative under the title Miss Comminges Pyrénées.

Year	Name	Age	Height	Hometown	Miss France placement	Notes
2007	Sandra Laporte	19	1.74 m (5 ft 8 1/2 in)	Labarthe-Rivière		
2006	Aurélia Gasc	21	1.74 m (5 ft 8 1/2 in)	Bonrepos-sur-Aussonnelle		
2005	Marie-Alexie Bazerque	20	1.76 m (5 ft 9 1/2 in)	Seich	Top 12	
2004	Alexia Cardoso	19	1.72 m (5 ft 7 1/2 in)	Miramont-de-Comminges		
2003	Aurélie Savard			Saint-Gaudens		

=== Miss Gascony ===
From the 1970s to 2000s, Midi-Pyrénées and Aquitaine crowned a representative under the title Miss Gascony (French: Miss Gascogne), to represent the historic region of Gascony, now located in Midi-Pyrénées and Aquitaine. Representatives crowned Miss Gascony who hailed from Aquitaine are included in the Miss Aquitaine article.

Year	Name	Age	Height	Hometown	Miss France placement	Notes
2006	Céline Fueyo	22	1.75 m (5 ft 9 in)	Auch		
2004	Audrey Manzoni	19	1.72 m (5 ft 7 1/2 in)	Monfort		
2002	Dorothée Jouhaud	20	1.75 m (5 ft 9 in)	Condom		
1996	Sabine Alves De Puga					
1995	Sandrine Dubouil					
1994	Caroline Laffont					
1993	Karine Mathieu	18		Lavardens		Current regional director of Miss Midi-Pyrénées under her married name, Karine Daries.
1992	Myriam Amouroux					
1991	Christine Beau					
1989	Claudia Compeyrot					
1988	Stéphanie Trupin					
1987	Coralie Nogueras					
1978	Patricia Gleyze					
1976	Marie-Noëlle Dardit					
1970	Marie-Thérèse Thiel				2nd Runner-Up	

=== Miss Midi-Pyrénées-Toulouse ===
From 1997 to 1999, the region crowned a representative under the title Miss Midi-Pyrénées-Toulouse.

Year	Name	Age	Height	Hometown	Miss France placement	Notes
1999	Sophie de Sousa	18	1.77 m (5 ft 9 1/2 in)	Tournefeuille		
1998	Linda Vogel	19	1.76 m (5 ft 9 1/2 in)	Toulouse		
1997	Amandine Mallen	19	1.73 m (5 ft 8 in)			

=== Miss Quercy ===
In the 1980s and 1990s, the departments of Lot and Tarn-et-Garonne competed separately under the title Miss Quercy.

Year	Name	Age	Height	Hometown	Miss France placement	Notes
1998	Magalie Menet	20	1.71 m (5 ft 7 1/2 in)	Vayrac		
1997	Virginie Soulignac	19	1.75 m (5 ft 9 in)			
1996	Delphine Verdié					
1995	Stéphanie Hardoin					
1994	Alexandra Fouilhac					
1992	Catherine Foursat					
1991	Florence Vidal					
1990	Corinne Delpech			Rocamadour		
1989	Nathalie Legras			Figeac		
1988	Géraldine Saidous					
1987	Laurence Leporc					
1986	Christine Mommeja					
1985	Nathalie Vilemain					
1983	Marie-France Parnot				3rd Runner-Up	

=== Miss Quercy-Rouergue ===
From 2001 to 2009, the departments of Aveyron, Lot, and Tarn-et-Garonne competed separately under the title Miss Quercy-Rouergue.

Year	Name	Age	Height	Hometown	Miss France placement	Notes
2009	Nathalie Ample	19	1.79 m (5 ft 10 1/2 in)	Labastide-Saint-Pierre	4th Runner-Up	
2008	Sophie Lopez	18	1.75 m (5 ft 9 in)	Figeac		
2007	Kelly Remus	20	1.77 m (5 ft 9 1/2 in)	Millau		
2006	Laurie Lastra	19	1.73 m (5 ft 8 in)	Montauban		
2005	Lisa Fernandez	18	1.79 m (5 ft 10 1/2 in)	L'Honor-de-Cos	Top 12	
2004	Émilie Rouquié	21	1.78 m (5 ft 10 in)	Gourdon		
2003	Nathalie Forcade			Lunan		
2002	Christel Leyenberger	22		Luc-la-Primaube	Top 12 (5th Runner-Up)	
2001	Frédérique Bourdie			Decazeville		

=== Miss Rouergue ===
In 1977, 1979, 1983, from 1985 to 1993, and in 1995, the department of Aveyron competed separately under the title Miss Rouergue.

Year	Name	Age	Height	Hometown	Miss France placement	Notes
1995	Julie Perdigues			Capdenac		
1993	Carole Cercley			Prades-d'Aubrac		
1992	Séverine Briois			Millau		
1991	Sarah Fortier			Sébazac-Concourès		
1990	Chantal Lauze			Millau		
1989	Karine Malzac			Millau		
1988	Leslie Borro	18	1.74 m (5 ft 8 1/2 in)	Millau	Top 12 (5th Runner-Up)	
1987	Christelle Rocagel				Top 12	
1986	Valérie Espitalier					
1985	Laurence Charras					
1983	Nadia Poullain	16			2nd Runner-Up	
1979	Élisabeth Peret					
1977	Nadine André					

=== Miss Rouergue-Cévennes ===
In 1996, the department of Aveyron competed separately under the title Miss Rouergue-Cévennes.

Year	Name	Age	Height	Hometown	Miss France placement	Notes
1996	Aurore Pecrix			Saint-Rome-de-Cernon		

=== Miss Toulouse ===
Sporadically in the 1970s, 1980s, and 1990s, the department of Haute-Garonne competed separately under the title Miss Toulouse.

Year	Name	Age	Height	Hometown	Miss France placement	Notes
1994	Stéphanie Kaysen				Top 12	
1991	Karine Siegel					
1990	Virginie Puertas					
1989	Martine Caudrillier					
1978	Catherine Dessèvre					Dessèvre was crowned Miss Toulouse in both 1978 and 1977, and was crowned Miss Charentes in 1976.
1977	Catherine Dessèvre					Dessèvre was crowned Miss Toulouse in both 1978 and 1977, and was crowned Miss Charentes in 1976.
1975	Catherine Bras					
1970	Agnès Smetshe					

=== Miss Toulouse Midi-Pyrénées ===
In 1988, 1993, 1995, and 1996, the region crowned a representative under the title Miss Toulouse Midi-Pyrénées.

Year	Name	Age	Height	Hometown	Miss France placement	Notes
1996	Marie Borg	19			1st Runner-Up	2nd Runner-Up at Miss International 1997
1995	Ella Talaya			Toulouse		
1993	Céline Duthil				Top 12	
1988	Nathalie Mihec					

=== Miss Toulouse-Languedoc ===
In 1968, the regions of Midi-Pyrénées and Languedoc-Roussillon crowned a shared representative under the title Miss Toulouse-Languedoc.

Year	Name	Age	Height	Hometown	Miss France placement	Notes
1968	Violette Pena				4th Runner-Up	
