= Miss France 2027 =

Beauty pageant

- Date: 12 December 2026
- Presenters: Jean-Pierre Foucault
- Venue: Futuroscope Arena, Chasseneuil-du-Poitou and Jaunay-Clan, Nouvelle-Aquitaine
- Broadcaster: TF1; TF1+
- Entrants: 31
- Placements: 12
- Returns: Saint Martin and Saint Barthélemy

Miss France 2027 will be the 97th edition of the Miss France pageant. The competition will be held on 12 December 2026 at the Futuroscope Arena in Vienne, Nouvelle-Aquitaine. Hinaupoko Devèze of Tahiti will crown her successor at the end of the event.

== Background ==
=== Location ===
In August 2026, it was announced at the Miss Languedoc pageant that Miss France 2027 would be held on 12 December 2026. On 7 October, the Miss France Company announced that the pageant would be held on 12 December at the Futuroscope Arena, located within the communes of Chasseneuil-du-Poitou and Jaunay-Clan in the Vienne department of Poitou-Charentes, near the city of Poitiers. This will be the fourth time that the Futuroscope hosts the competition and the first since Miss France 2025.

In September 2026, it was announced that the overseas trip would be held in Saint Martin. The contestants will visit Saint Martin for a variety of events, before traveling to the host city to begin rehearsals.

=== Selection of contestants ===
The 2027 contestants were selected through regional pageants, held between April and September 2026.

The 2027 edition will see the return of Saint Martin and Saint Barthélemy, as the region typically takes part on a biennial basis.

== Results ==
| Result | Contestant |
|---|---|
| Miss France 2027 | |
| 1st Runner-Up | |
| 2nd Runner-Up | |
| 3rd Runner-Up | |
| 4th Runner-Up | |
| Top 12 | |

=== Special awards ===
| Prize | Contestant |
|---|---|
| General Culture Award | Picardy – Marie Villez (16.5/20) (Note: The General Culture Award is given to the contestant with the highest score on the general culture exam, which tests contestants' grasp of topics such as history, politics, current events, and pop culture. Miss Picardy received the highest score of 16.5 and was thus given the award.) |

== Pageant ==
On 13 November 2026, it was announced that the theme for the competition would be Les Miss et la mode (English: The misses and fashion), with competition rounds inspired by various eras and styles of fashion.

=== Judges ===
On 13 November, it was confirmed that Sophie Thalmann would serve as a member of the jury and the official godmother of the winner of the Miss France 2027 competition, taking over the role from Camille Cerf.

== Contestants ==
The following 31 contestants will compete:

| Region | Contestant | Age (Note: Ages at the time of the pageant) | Height | Hometown | Placement | Notes |
|---|---|---|---|---|---|---|
| Alsace | Chiara Blazevic | 24 | 1.76 m (5 ft 9 1/2 in) | Rantzwiller | | |
| Aquitaine | Solène Videau | 22 | 1.74 m (5 ft 8 1/2 in) | Mérignac | | |
| Auvergne | Lina Berthelier | 24 | 1.73 m (5 ft 8 in) | Commentry | | |
| Brittany | Margot Ferré-Bernard | 20 | 1.71 m (5 ft 7 1/2 in) | Guipavas | | |
| Burgundy | Ilona Perrot | 23 | 1.76 m (5 ft 9 1/2 in) | La Fermeté | | |
| Centre-Val de Loire | Justine Bourrelier | 26 | 1.76 m (5 ft 9 1/2 in) | Dammarie | | |
| Champagne-Ardenne | Céline Leduc | 24 | 1.83 m (6 ft 0 in) | Tagnon | | |
| Corsica | Satine Nomary | 20 | 1.76 m (5 ft 9 1/2 in) | Grosseto-Prugna | | |
| (Nice) Côte d'Azur | May Haoues | 19 | 1.74 m (5 ft 8 1/2 in) | Cagnes-sur-Mer | | |
| Franche-Comté | Emma Ninot | 21 | 1.74 m (5 ft 8 1/2 in) | Laire | | |
| French Guiana | Sandra Justine | 23 | 1.77 m (5 ft 9 1/2 in) | Kourou | | |
| Guadeloupe | Julia Désirée | 20 | 1.81 m (5 ft 11 1/2 in) | Les Abymes | | |
| Île-de-France | Camilla Alash | 24 | 1.81 m (5 ft 11 1/2 in) | Clichy | | |
| (Languedoc-Roussillon) Languedoc | Candice Gauch | 29 | 1.76 m (5 ft 9 1/2 in) | Mende | | |
| Limousin | Élise Escuriol | 22 | 1.74 m (5 ft 8 1/2 in) | Brive-la-Gaillarde | | |
| Lorraine | Léane Froment | 21 | 1.72 m (5 ft 7 1/2 in) | Gondreville | | |
| Martinique | Maureen-Alycia Lucea-Merlin | 24 | 1.76 m (5 ft 9 1/2 in) | Fort-de-France | | |
| Mayotte | Emma Saïd Issouf | 24 | 1.76 m (5 ft 9 1/2 in) | Mamoudzou | | |
| Midi-Pyrénées | Carla Rachail | 23 | 1.73 m (5 ft 8 in) | Toulouse | | |
| New Caledonia | Lana Prost | 18 | 1.75 m (5 ft 9 in) | Le Mont-Dore | | |
| Nord-Pas-de-Calais | Shana Mendes | 18 | 1.75 m (5 ft 9 in) | Hem | | |
| Normandy | Pauline Gourlez | 22 | 1.71 m (5 ft 7 1/2 in) | Giberville | | |
| Pays de la Loire | Maëlle Hamon | 23 | 1.72 m (5 ft 7 1/2 in) | Les Sorinières | | |
| Picardy | Marie Villez | 26 | 1.73 m (5 ft 8 in) | Amiens | | |
| Poitou-Charentes | Mandy Goudal | 38 | 1.74 m (5 ft 8 1/2 in) | Saintes | | |
| Provence | Ophélie Vitalbo | 28 | 1.71 m (5 ft 7 1/2 in) | Velleron | | |
| Réunion | Laetitia Roguet | 21 | 1.72 m (5 ft 7 1/2 in) | Saint-Benoît | | |
| Rhône-Alpes | Julia Grid-Costantino | 23 | 1.74 m (5 ft 8 1/2 in) | Lyon | | |
| Roussillon | Juliette Gauthier | 23 | 1.74 m (5 ft 8 1/2 in) | Le Boulou | | |
| Saint Martin and Saint Barthélemy | Naïla Parotte | 22 | 1.83 m (6 ft 0 in) | Marigot | | |
| (French Polynesia) Tahiti | Leia Diard | 22 | 1.72 m (5 ft 7 1/2 in) | Arue | | |
