= Miss Roussillon =

French beauty pageant

- Type: Beauty pageant
- Headquarters: Pyrénées-Orientales, France
- Members: Miss France
- Official language: French
- Regional director: Cindy Filipiak

Miss Roussillon is a French beauty pageant which selects a representative for the Miss France national competition from the department of Pyrénées-Orientales in the region of Languedoc-Roussillon. While the first Miss Roussillon was crowned in 1937, the pageant had been organized irregularly until 2022, and was previously under the authority of the Miss Languedoc-Roussillon committee until the formation of the independent Miss Roussillon committee in 2024.

The current Miss Roussillon is Juliette Gauthier, who was crowned Miss Roussillon 2026 on 5 July 2026. One woman from Roussillon has been crowned Miss France:

- Annie Garrigues, who was crowned Miss France 1938, competing as Miss Roussillon

== Results summary ==
- Miss France: Annie Garrigues (1937)
- 4th Runner-Up: Katherina Navegand (1980); Nathalie Huc (1987); Déborah Adelin-Chabal (2025)
- Top 12/Top 15: Marion Castaing (2010); Julie Vialo (2011); Marilou Cubaynes (2012); Sabine Banet (2013); Sheana Vila Real Coimbra (2014); Chiara Fontaine (2022); Élise Aquilina (2023)

== Gallery ==
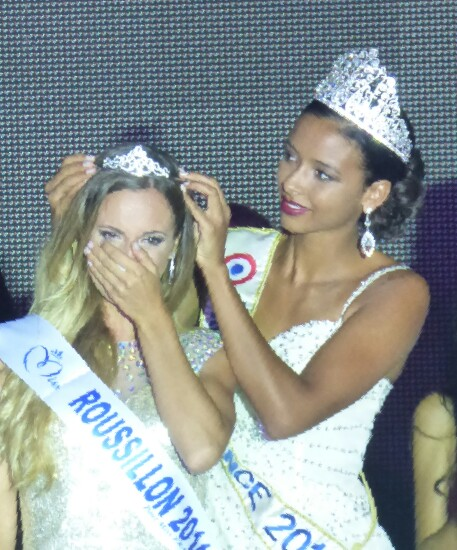
Miss Roussillon 2014
Sheana Vila Real

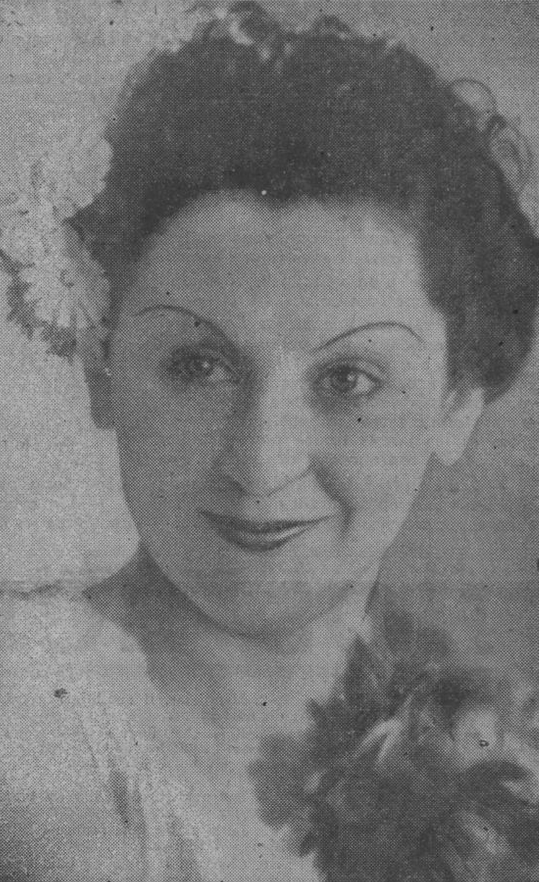
Miss Roussillon 1937 and Miss France 1938
Annie Garrigues

== Titleholders ==
| Year | Name | Age (Note: Ages at the time of Miss France) | Height | Hometown | Miss France placement | Notes |
|---|---|---|---|---|---|---|
| 2026 | Juliette Gauthier | 22 | 1.74 m (5 ft 8 1/2 in) | Le Boulou | TBD | |
| 2025 | Déborah Adelin-Chabal | 18 | 1.75 m (5 ft 9 in) | Cabestany | 4th Runner-Up | Adelin-Chabal is the cousin of former rugby union player Sébastien Chabal. |
| 2024 | Cassiopée Rimbaud | 21 | 1.71 m (5 ft 7 1/2 in) | Laroque-des-Albères | | |
| 2023 | Élise Aquilina | 21 | 1.71 m (5 ft 7 1/2 in) | Cabestany | Top 15 | |
| 2022 | Chiara Fontaine | 20 | 1.74 m (5 ft 8 1/2 in) | Corneilla-del-Vercol | Top 15 | |
| 2015 | Anais Marin | 21 | 1.78 m (5 ft 10 in) | Alénya | | |
| 2014 | Sheana Vila Real | 20 | 1.70 m (5 ft 7 in) | Perpignan | Top 12 | |
| 2013 | Norma Julia | 21 | 1.72 m (5 ft 7 1/2 in) | Perpignan | Did not compete | Julia was crowned Miss Roussillon 2013 and dethroned after less than two weeks when it emerged that she had posed partially nude in an erotic photoshoot, against Miss France rules. She was replaced by Banet, her first runner-up. The pageant was held amidst the disappearance of Allison and Marie-José Benitez, the former of whom was initially meant to be a contestant in the pageant. |
| 2013 | Sabine Banet | 21 | 1.74 m (5 ft 8 1/2 in) | Saleilles | Top 12 | Julia was crowned Miss Roussillon 2013 and dethroned after less than two weeks when it emerged that she had posed partially nude in an erotic photoshoot, against Miss France rules. She was replaced by Banet, her first runner-up. The pageant was held amidst the disappearance of Allison and Marie-José Benitez, the former of whom was initially meant to be a contestant in the pageant. |
| 2012 | Marilou Cubaynes | 24 | 1.73 m (5 ft 8 in) | Cabestany | Top 12 | |
| 2011 | Julie Vialo | 18 | 1.70 m (5 ft 7 in) | Toulouges | Top 12 | |
| 2010 | Marion Castaing | 22 | 1.76 m (5 ft 9 1/2 in) | Canet-en-Roussillon | Top 12 | Castaing was crowned Miss Roussillon 2009 and dethroned after it emerged she had participated in two regional pageants, against Miss France rules, and was replaced by Callivrousis, her first runner-up. After the rule was changed the following year, Castaing competed again and was crowned Miss Roussillon 2010. |
| 2009 | Marion Castaing | 21 | 1.76 m (5 ft 9 1/2 in) | Canet-en-Roussillon | Did not compete | Castaing was crowned Miss Roussillon 2009 and dethroned after it emerged she had participated in two regional pageants, against Miss France rules, and was replaced by Callivrousis, her first runner-up. After the rule was changed the following year, Castaing competed again and was crowned Miss Roussillon 2010. |
| 2009 | Céline Callivrousis | 22 | 1.70 m (5 ft 7 in) | Villeneuve-de-la-Raho | | Castaing was crowned Miss Roussillon 2009 and dethroned after it emerged she had participated in two regional pageants, against Miss France rules, and was replaced by Callivrousis, her first runner-up. After the rule was changed the following year, Castaing competed again and was crowned Miss Roussillon 2010. |
| 2005 | Florence Micolau | 22 | 1.72 m (5 ft 7 1/2 in) | Perpignan | | |
| 1990 | Muriel de Angelis | | | | | In 1990, de Angelis was crowned Miss Roussillon and Birba was crowned Miss Côte Vermeille, and they both represented Pyrénées-Orientales. |
| 1990 | Nathalie Birba | | | | | In 1990, de Angelis was crowned Miss Roussillon and Birba was crowned Miss Côte Vermeille, and they both represented Pyrénées-Orientales. |
| 1988 | Christine Lemaire | | | | | |
| 1987 | Nathalie Huc | | | | 4th Runner-Up | |
| 1986 | Sandra Marti | | | | | |
| 1985 | Béatrice Bonsons | | | | | |
| 1980 | Katherina Navegand | | | | 4th Runner-Up | |
| 1979 | Brigitte Choquet | 23 | 1.75 m (5 ft 9 in) | | | Competed at Miss Universe 1980 |
| 1976 | Angélique Busseron | | | | | Busseron competed as Miss Côte Catalane. |
| 1937 | Annie Garrigues | 19 | | | Miss France 1938 | |
