= Miss Mayotte =

French beauty pageant

- Type: Beauty pageant
- Headquarters: Mayotte, France
- Members: Miss France
- Official language: French
- Regional director: Zalia Said Salim

Miss Mayotte is a French beauty pageant, which selects a representative for the Miss France national competition from the overseas region of Mayotte. The competition was first held in 2000.

The current titleholder is Emma Saïd Issouf, who was crowned Miss Mayotte 2026 on 29 August 2026. No Miss Mayotte winners have gone on to win Miss France.

== Results summary ==
- 3rd Runner-Up: Esthel Née (2008)
- Top 12/Top 15: Maïté Boudy (2002); Élodie-Méryl Anridhoini (2010); Anlia Charifa (2020)

== Gallery ==
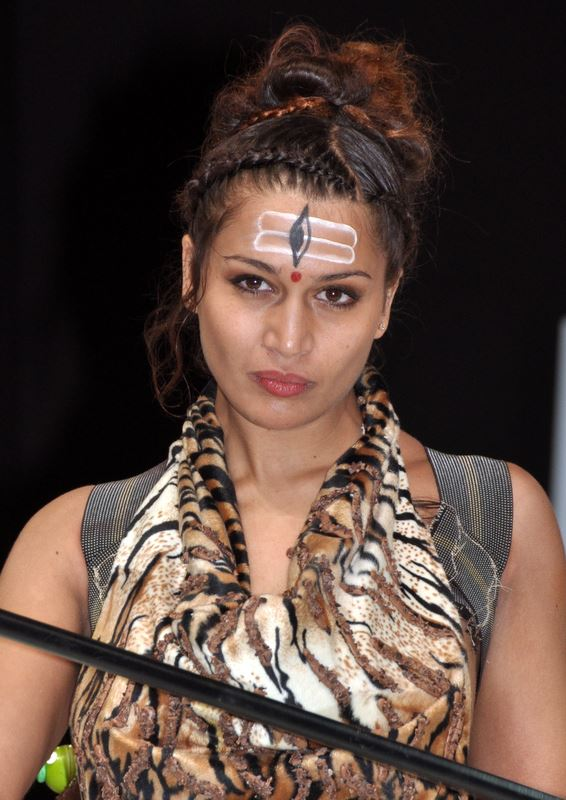
Miss Mayotte 2004
Maeva Schublin

== Titleholders ==
Year	Name	Age (Note: Ages at the time of Miss France)	Height	Hometown	Miss France placement	Notes
2027	Emma Saïd Issouf	24	1.76 m (5 ft 9 1/2 in)	Mamoudzou	TBD	
2025	Kamillat Hervian	24	1.73 m (5 ft 8 in)	Ouangani		
2024	Zaya Toumbou	20	1.73 m (5 ft 8 in)	Acoua		
2023	Houdayifa Chibaco	22	1.72 m (5 ft 7 1/2 in)	M'Tsangamouji		
2021	Anna Ousseni	24	1.70 m (5 ft 7 in)	Sada		
2020	Anlia Charifa	23	1.77 m (5 ft 9 1/2 in)	Dzaoudzi	Top 15	
2019	Eva Labourdère	20	1.75 m (5 ft 9 in)	Mamoudzou		
2018	Ousna Attoumani	20	1.76 m (5 ft 9 1/2 in)	Chiconi		
2017	Vanylle Emasse	20	1.70 m (5 ft 7 in)	Koungou		
2016	Naïma Madi Mahadali	19	1.73 m (5 ft 8 in)	Bouéni		
2015	Ramatou Radjabo	18	1.70 m (5 ft 7 in)	Chirongui		
2014	Ludy Langlade	18	1.76 m (5 ft 9 1/2 in)	Chirongui		
2013	Daniati Yves	24	1.70 m (5 ft 7 in)	Tsingoni		
2012	Stanisla Saïd	22	1.76 m (5 ft 9 1/2 in)	Pamandzi		
2011	Aïcha Ahmed Bachir	20	1.74 m (5 ft 8 1/2 in)	Mamoudzou		
2010	Elisabeth Ongaretto	19	1.70 m (5 ft 7 in)	Mamoudzou		
2009	Élodie-Méryl Anridhoini	19	1.74 m (5 ft 8 1/2 in)	Chirongui	Top 12	
2008	Esthel Née	20	1.80 m (5 ft 11 in)	Bandrélé	3rd Runner-Up	
2007	Nasma Choudjaïdine	18	1.80 m (5 ft 11 in)	Bègles		
2006	Karida Salim	21	1.70 m (5 ft 7 in)	Koungou		
2005	Nayma Bacari	18	1.72 m (5 ft 7 1/2 in)	Sada		
2004	Maeva Schublin	19	1.76 m (5 ft 9 1/2 in)	Mamoudzou		
2003	Natacha Achirafi			Mamoudzou		
2002	Salima Mogne Ahamadi					
2001	Maïté Boudy				Top 12	
2000	Mariame Hassani			Mamoudzou		
