= Cindy Fabre =

Miss France 2005 (born 1985)

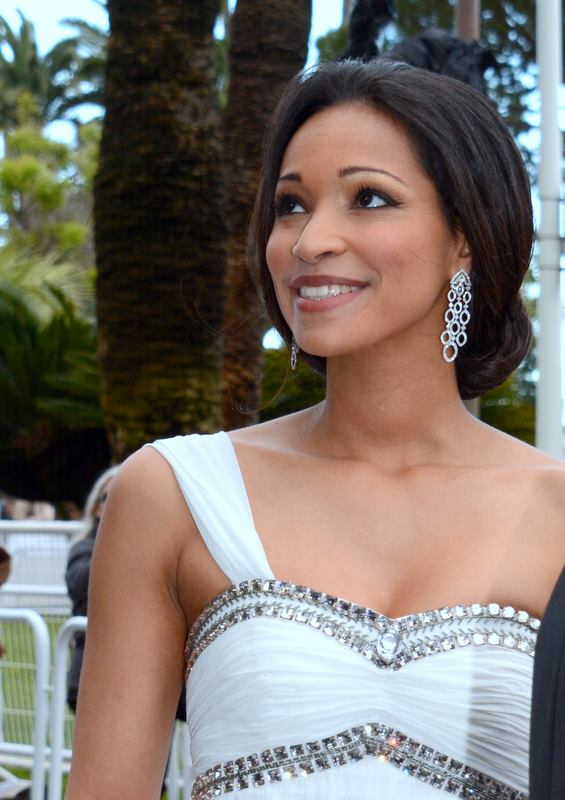
- Fabre at the 2013 Cannes Film Festival
- Born: 26 September 1985 (age 41); Cosne-Cours-sur-Loire, France
- Height: 1.78 m (5 ft 10 in)
- Spouse: Sylvain Camos (m. 2024)
- Children: 1
- Beauty pageant titleholder
- Title: Miss Calvados 2004; Miss Lower Normandy 2004; Miss Normandy 2004; Miss France 2005
- Major competitions: Miss France 2005 (Winner); Miss Universe 2005 (Unplaced); Miss World 2005 (Unplaced); Miss Europe 2005 (2nd Runner-Up)

Cindy Fabre (born 26 September 1985) is a French beauty pageant titleholder who was crowned Miss France 2005. She went on to represent France at the Miss Universe 2005, Miss World 2005, and Miss Europe 2005 pageants, placing as the second runner-up at the latter.

In August 2022, Fabre was announced as the new national director of Miss France, taking over from Sylvie Tellier, who had served in the position since 2007. In January 2025, it was announced that Fabre had left her position with Miss France.

== Early life ==
Fabre was born on 26 September 1985 in Cosne-Cours-sur-Loire in the Nièvre department of Burgundy. Her mother is a nursing assistant from Guadeloupe, while her father is a printer from Burgundy. In 2000, the family moved to the town of Falaise in the Calvados department of Normandy, where she spent the remainder of her upbringing. Prior to becoming Miss France, Fabre studied marketing.

== Pageantry ==
Fabre began her career in pageantry after winning the Miss Calvados 2004 title in Falaise, and later won Miss Lower Normandy 2004 as well. The latter title qualified her for the regional Miss Normandy 2004 pageant in Vire, which she also went on to win. As Miss Normandy 2004, Fabre competed in the Miss France 2005 competition, held in December 2004 in Tours. She ultimately won the competition, becoming the fifth entrant representing Normandy to become Miss France.

As Miss France, Fabre represented France at the Miss Universe 2005, Miss World 2005, and Miss Europe 2005 international pageants. She was unplaced in the former two, but went on to place as the second runner-up at the latter. Fabre completed her reign as Miss France in December 2005, crowning Alexandra Rosenfeld of Languedoc as her successor.

In August 2022, it was announced that Fabre would be joining the Miss France Company as a national director alongside incoming president Alexia Laroche-Joubert, taking over a role that had been held by Sylvie Tellier since 2007. Fabre remained in the role with Miss France following the departure of Laroche-Joubert in December 2023. However, she later left the position in January 2025, after her contract was not renewed amidst a controversial interview after Miss France 2025 featuring Angélique Angarni-Filopon, in which Angarni-Filopon refused to say the "Je suis Charlie" slogan for the ten-year anniversary of the Charlie Hebdo shooting.

== Personal life ==
In July 2012, Fabre announced that she was pregnant with her first child, and later gave birth to her son. With her former partner, Fabre ran the restaurant Le Fabrik in Cannes.

As of 2022, Fabre runs the event planning company EMA Events, and resides in Dijon in Burgundy. In 2024, Fabre married her husband Sylvain Camos.

Awards and achievements
Preceded by (Alsace) Laëtitia Bléger	Miss France; 2005	Succeeded by (Languedoc-Roussillon) Alexandra Rosenfeld
Preceded by Isabelle Mouchel	Miss Normandy; 2004	Succeeded by Delphine Lefebvre
