= Agnès Souret =

French actress and model

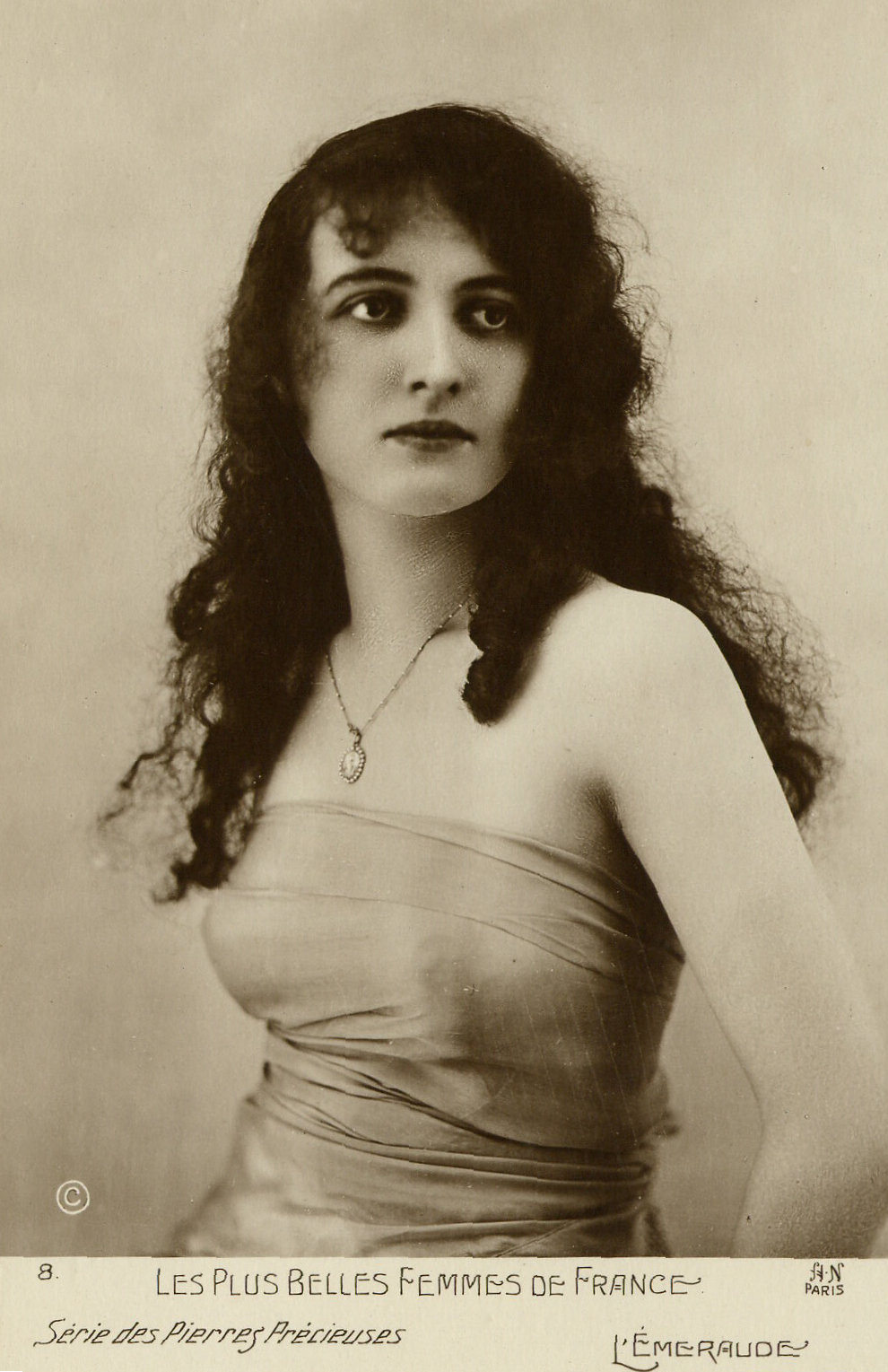
- Born: Jeanne Germaine Berthe Agnès Souret; 21 January 1902; Bayonne, French Third Republic
- Died: 30 September 1928 (aged 26); Argentina
- Years active: 1920–1928

Jeanne Germaine Berthe Agnès Souret (21 January 1902 – 30 September 1928) was a French Basque actress, dancer and beauty pageant titleholder who was the winner of the inaugural Miss France competition in 1920.

== Biography ==
Jeanne Germaine Berthe Agnès Souret was a French-Basque born in Bayonne on 21 January 1902, the daughter of former ballet dancer Marguerite Souret. Her grandfather was Henri Souret, a customs official in the town of Bidarray. Her formative years were spent at Espelette in Labourd, Northern Basque Country.

== La plus belle femme de France ==
In 1919, the dark brown haired, brown eyed Souret was the winner of a beauty competition to become Miss Midi-Pyrénées. In 1920, she was acclaimed as the most beautiful woman in France (La plus belle femme de France) in a contest now regarded as the inaugural Miss France competition. The 17-year-old Souret won over 2,000 entrants and attracted 115,000 votes. In Le Figaro, she was described as a ‘’dazzling beauty’’ In The New York Times, she was called "the fairest in France".

== Career ==
Souret's success in the competition and the subsequent publicity resulted in her becoming for a few years one of the most celebrated women in France. Her photograph was extensively circulated in journals and magazines. (Note: The very first edition of the French film magazine Cinemagazine published in January 1921 features Souret on the front cover)

Details of her life were commonplace in the gossip columns of the early 20s. She appeared in a dancing role at the famous Parisian music hall the Folies Bergère and the Opéra de Monte-Carlo. She was in two films directed by Henry Houry: La Maison des pendus and Le Lys du Mont Saint-Michel. Her fame extended beyond France to the United Kingdom where, in 1922, she appeared in the revue Pins and Needles at the Gaiety Theatre in the West End of London. While in London, she was invited, along with two English actresses, Margaret Leahy and Katherine Campbell, by film director Edward José and producer Joseph M. Schenck for an audition to appear in films in Hollywood travelling to the United States at the end of 1922. Although her screen tests do not appear to have led a role, her beauty was noticed. Her book, The Famous Book of Beauty Secrets, was published by the Chicago Mail Order Company in 1922. (Note: A full page image of Souret's face adorns the front page of the San Francisco Chronicle on 30 September 1923.) Her last film appearance was a minor role in La Tournée Farigoule, directed by Marcel Manchez.

== Death ==
Agnès Souret died of peritonitis on 30 September 1928, aged 26, whilst touring Argentina. To ensure that her body could be repatriated to France, Souret's mother Marguerite raised the money by selling many of her goods including her house at Espelette. Agnès Souret was laid to rest at her home Basque Country village in a tomb that features a sculpture by Lucien Danglade. (Note: In 2002, André Darraïdou, the mayor of Espelette invited the head of Monument historique to visit Souret’s tomb with a view to establishing it for official preservation. A ceremony and an exhibition of Souret's life were organised leading to the tomb becoming a tourist attraction.)

The tomb was classified under Monument historique as a National Heritage Site of France in 2006. The heritage protection was made applicable in September 2006. It is indexed with an identification number in the Base Mérimée, a database of architectural heritage maintained by the French Ministry of Culture, under the reference PM64001441.

== Filmography ==
- 1920: Le Lys du Mont Saint-Michel
- 1921: La Maison des pendus
- 1926 : La tournée Farigoule
