= Miss Saint Martin and Saint Barthélemy =

- Type: Beauty pageant
- Headquarters: Saint Martin, France
- Members: Miss France
- Official language: French
- Regional director: Catherine Vermont de Boisrolin

Miss Saint Martin and Saint Barthélemy (French: Miss Saint-Martin et Saint-Barthélemy) is a French beauty pageant which selects a representative for the Miss France national competition from the overseas collectivities of Saint Martin and Saint Barthélemy. The competition was first introduced as solely Miss Saint Martin in 2012, while it became Miss Saint Martin and Saint Barthélemy in 2016. The regional competition is typically held biennially.

The current Miss Saint Martin and Saint Barthélemy is Naïla Parotte, who was crowned Miss Saint Martin and Saint Barthélemy 2026 on 1 August 2026. No Miss Saint Martin and Saint Barthélemy titleholders have gone on to win Miss France.

== Results summary ==
- Top 12/Top 15: Layla Berry (2019)

== Titleholders ==
Year	Name	Age (Note: Ages at the time of Miss France)	Height	Hometown	Miss France placement	Notes
2026	Naïla Parotte	22	1.82 m (5 ft 11 1/2 in)	Marigot	TBD	
2024	Sasha Bique	20	1.70 m (5 ft 7 in)	Marigot		
2022	Inès Tessier	20	1.71 m (5 ft 7 1/2 in)	Gustavia		
2020	Naïma Dessout	18	1.75 m (5 ft 9 in)	Concordia	Did not compete	Dessout was barred from competing in Miss France amidst a nude photo scandal, but was permitted to continue her reign as Miss Saint-Martin and Saint-Barthélemy.
2019	Layla Berry	20	1.74 m (5 ft 8 1/2 in)	Grande Saline	Top 15	
2018	Allisson Georges	18	1.70 m (5 ft 7 in)	Marigot		
2016	Anaëlle Hyppolite	18	1.75 m (5 ft 9 in)	Marigot		

=== Miss Saint Martin ===
From 2012 until 2016, the competition was titled Miss Saint Martin and only represented Saint Martin.

Year	Name	Age	Height	Hometown	Miss France placement	Notes
2014	Nadika Matthew-Gauthier	19	1.72 m (5 ft 7 1/2 in)	Grand Case		
2012	Suzon Bonnet	22	1.74 m (5 ft 8 1/2 in)	Marigot		
