= Miss France =

Beauty pageant

- Type: Beauty pageant
- Headquarters: Paris
- Country represented: France
- Qualifies for: Miss World Miss Supranational
- First edition: 1920; 106 years ago
- Most recent edition: 2026
- Current titleholder: Hinaupoko Devèze; Tahiti
- President: Frédéric Gilbert
- Language: French
- Website: miss-france.fr

Miss France is a national beauty pageant in France held annually in December. The competition was first held in 1920, and has been organized continuously since 1947. The trademark for the pageant is owned by the company Miss France SAS, and is a subsidiary of Endemol Shine France. The competition is currently aired on TF1. The winner of this pageant may represent France at Miss World or Miss Supranational after ending her reign as Miss France.

The Miss France pageant was first organized in 1920, under the name La plus belle femme de France (English: The most beautiful woman of France), and was held for one additional year before being abandoned until 1927. That year, the competition was rebranded into Miss France, and was held annually until it was disrupted in 1940, due to World War II. In 1947, following the end of the war, the competition was revived and has been held annually since. In 1954, Guy Lévy founded the Miss France Committee (French: comité Miss France) to organize the competition. Geneviève de Fontenay took over the Miss France Committee in 1981, until departing in 2007. Following the departure of de Fontenay, Sylvie Tellier served as the national director of Miss France until August 2022, when she was replaced by Cindy Fabre. In October 2021, Alexia Laroche-Joubert was announced as the new president of the Miss France Committee, working alongside Tellier and later Fabre. In March 2023, Frédéric Gilbert, a longtime producer of Miss France, was appointed by Laroche-Joubert as director-general. Laroche-Joubert departed from the Miss France Committee in December 2023, and was replaced by Gilbert. Fabre later departed as well in January 2025.

Contestants of Miss France must meet a number of eligibility requirements and first win a regional title which qualifies them for the national competition, representing their region. A number of these regions also organize local competitions corresponding with cities and departments within the region, which must be won first before one can progress to competing in the regional competition. The winner of Miss France resides in Paris during her year of reign in a rent-free apartment, in addition to winning a number of additional prizes and sponsorship deals while receiving a monthly salary. The winner may represent France at either Miss World or Miss Supranational, while runners-up and former winners may also be appointed to represent the country as well in cases where the reigning Miss France is unable or unwilling to compete.

The current Miss France is Hinaupoko Devèze, who was crowned on 6 December 2025 at Miss France 2026. She had previously been crowned Miss Tahiti 2025, and is the sixth woman from French Polynesia to win the title.

== History ==
The Miss France was first organized in 1920, under the name La plus belle femme de France (English: The most beautiful woman of France). The competition was founded by journalist Maurice de Waleffe, who chose to have the winner be decided by French filmgoers. After more than 1,700 women applied for the competition, 49 finalists were chosen. The competition was held over the course of several weeks, with filmgoers being given a ballot with seven women, and asked to select their favorite. Agnès Souret was selected as the inaugural winner. The following year, the competition was held again, with Pauline Pô winning the competition. However, La plus belle femme de France was later abandoned after 1921.

Six years later the competition was revived under the name Miss France, with a new format organized by Robert and Jean Cousin. Miss France continued to be held annually until 1940, when World War II disrupted entertainment events. The competition resumed in 1947, and has been held annually since then. Geneviève de Fontenay, who had begun her career with the Miss France Committee in 1954, became its president in 1981, transforming it into a company, and bringing it to a live broadcast in 1986, when the competition became the first edition of Miss France to be broadcast live on national television. The contest was first aired on France Régions 3 and remained on the same channel until 1995. In 1995, the live broadcast of Miss France 1996 was moved to TF1, where it has remained since. In 2011, a dissident competition, Miss Excellence France was launched by Geneviève de Fontenay after her resignation from the Miss France Company in April 2010.

Miss France achieved its first victory at a Big Four international pageant when Sophie Perin won Miss International 1976. Perin had previously won Miss France 1975 and Miss Lorraine 1974. Iris Mittenaere became the company's second major winner when she won Miss Universe 2016. Mittenaere had previously won Miss France 2016 and Miss Nord-Pas-de-Calais 2015.

In October 2021, Alexia Laroche-Joubert was announced as the new president of the Miss France Company, working alongside Sylvie Tellier, the national director. In August 2022, Tellier was reported to have resigned her position as national director of Miss France, and was replaced by Cindy Fabre. Tellier continued to serve in an advisory role with the organization, until her departure at the conclusion of Miss France 2023. In March 2023, Frédéric Gilbert, a longtime producer of Miss France, was appointed by Laroche-Joubert as director-general. In November 2023, Laroche-Joubert announced she would resign from her leadership role with Miss France following the conclusion of Miss France 2024, due to her responsibilities as CEO of Banijay France; she was replaced by Gilbert as president upon her departure. Fabre later departed as well in January 2025. Beginning with Miss France 2026, it was announced that a former Miss France titleholder would now serve as the official godmother to the incumbent titleholder, accompanying her to events and taking on a similar role that de Fontenay, Tellier, and Fabre had served in with past titleholders; the first godmother selected was Camille Cerf, as the godmother to Hinaupoko Devèze.

In 2021, Osez le féminisme, a French feminist organization, sued Miss France and its parent company, Endemol Production, for sexist and discriminatory employment regulations. The lawsuit argued that the contestants in the pageant should be considered employees of the competition, thereby forbidding Miss France and Endemol from engaging in discrimination. A Paris court later dismissed the group's claims and threw out the lawsuit in January 2023.

In April 2024, it was revealed that a museum dedicated to Miss France would open in the town of Saint-Raphaël in the Var department in 2025. The opening of the museum was later postponed to 2026 for budgetary reasons.

In May 2026, the Miss France Company announced that they had suspended their relationship with the Miss Universe Organization due to the controversy surrounding the 2025 edition of the competition. The following month, the Miss France Company confirmed that they would begin sending representatives to compete at Miss Supranational.

== Contestants ==
Each year, contestants are chosen through a series of regional pageants held throughout metropolitan and overseas France in the summer and autumn before the national competition. Over time, the regions represented at Miss France have varied slightly. The following 31 regional pageants currently send contestants to Miss France:

- Miss Alsace
- Miss Aquitaine
- Miss Auvergne
- Miss Brittany
- Miss Burgundy
- Miss Centre-Val de Loire
- Miss Champagne-Ardenne
- Miss Corsica
- Miss Côte d'Azur
- Miss Franche-Comté
- Miss French Guiana
- Miss Guadeloupe
- Miss Île-de-France
- Miss Languedoc
- Miss Limousin
- Miss Lorraine
- Miss Martinique
- Miss Mayotte
- Miss Midi-Pyrénées
- Miss New Caledonia
- Miss Nord-Pas-de-Calais
- Miss Normandy
- Miss Pays de la Loire
- Miss Picardy
- Miss Poitou-Charentes
- Miss Provence
- Miss Réunion
- Miss Roussillon
- Miss Rhône-Alpes
- Miss Saint Martin and Saint Barthélemy
- Miss Tahiti

The regional competitions are organized by regional committees, and contestants must reside in the region they choose to represent. Regional committees have their own discretion as to how they wish to field candidates for the regional competitions. Some choose to organize a number of local competitions corresponding to cities or departments within the region, while others use open casting processes. Public voting is used to select winners of both regional pageants and the national competition. The winner of the national competition subsequently receives a number of prizes, including a rent-free apartment in Paris, sponsorship deals, and a monthly salary.

=== Rules and eligibility ===
In order to compete in Miss France, contestants must meet the following eligibility requirements:

Contestants must:

- Be legally female and of French nationality through birth or naturalization.
- Be at least 18 years old on 1 November of the year of the competition.
- Be at least 1.70 m (5 ft 7 in) tall.
- Have a clean criminal record.

Contestants must not:

- Have had her image exploited in a manner that could be incompatible or pose an obstacle to the organizers' rights.
- Have received cosmetic surgery or use appearance-altering products such as wigs or colored contact lenses.
- Have ever posed partially or completely nude, including after the competition as well.
- Have associated with political or religious propaganda while a regional titleholder.

The pageant's code of ethics also requires that contestants not engage in smoking or public alcohol consumption. Failure to comply with pageant rules carries a fine of 5,000 Euro.

Prior to Miss France 2023, contestants also could not have been married, divorced, or widowed; have children or have been pregnant; be above the age of 24 on 1 November of the year of the competition; or have visible tattoos or non-ear piercings.

== Recent titleholders ==
Year	Miss France	Region	Age (Note: Ages at the time of Miss France)	Hometown	Notes
2026	Hinaupoko Devèze	(French Polynesia) Tahiti	23	Māhina	
2025	Angélique Angarni-Filopon	Martinique	34	Fort-de-France	
2024	Eve Gilles	Nord-Pas-de-Calais	20	Quaëdypre	Top 30 at Miss Universe 2025 1st runner-up at Miss Supranational 2026
2023	Indira Ampiot	Guadeloupe	18	Basse-Terre	Top 30 at Miss Universe 2024 Top 12 at Miss World 2026
2022	Diane Leyre	Île-de-France	24	Paris	

=== Gallery ===
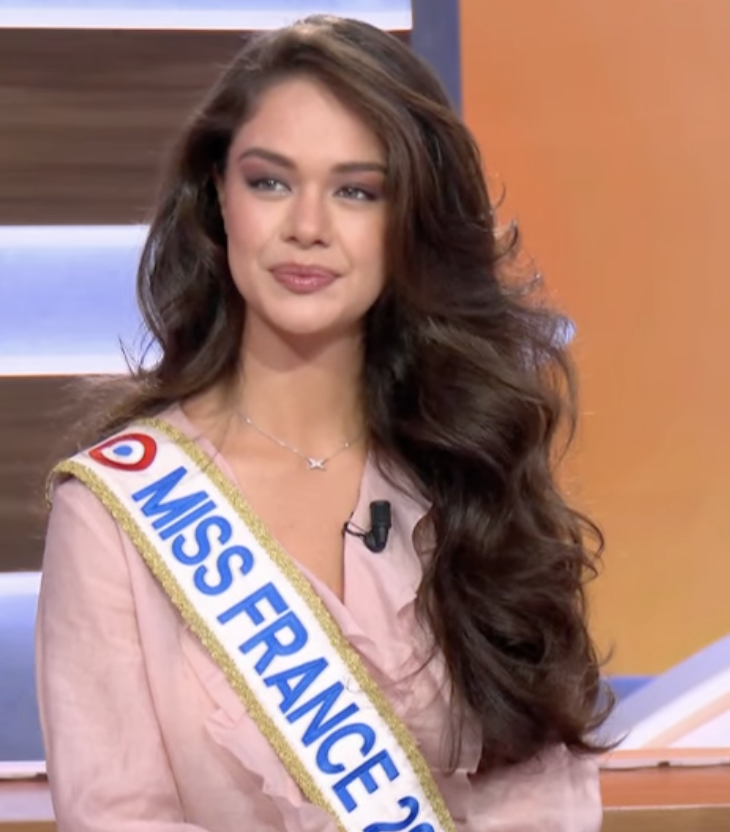
Miss France 2026
Hinaupoko Devèze

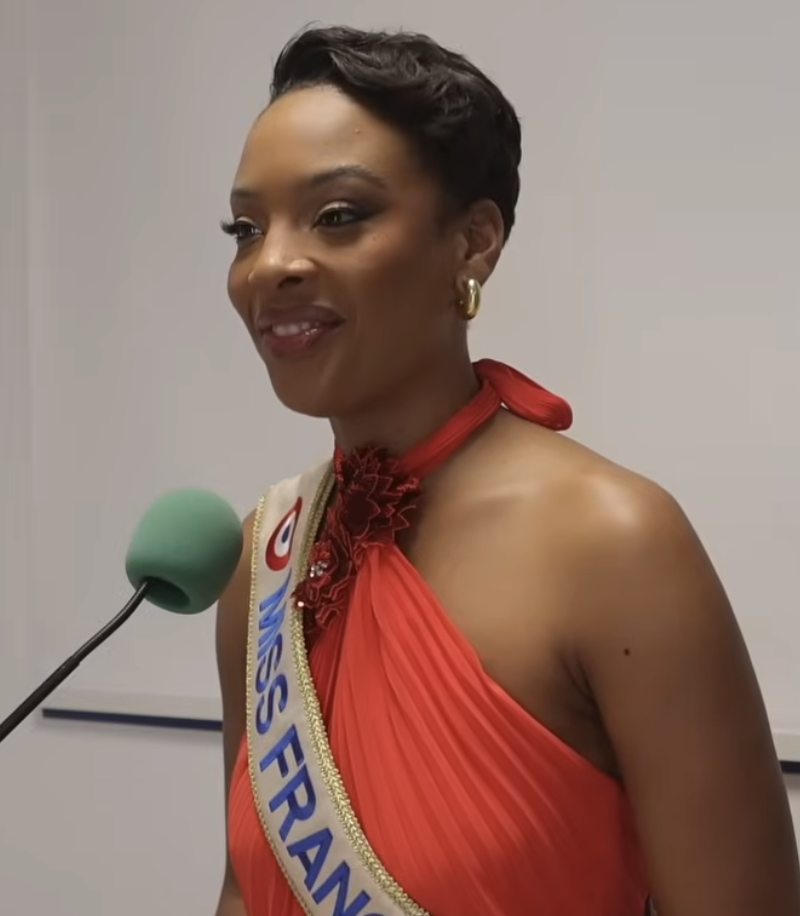
Miss France 2025
Angélique Angarni-Filopon

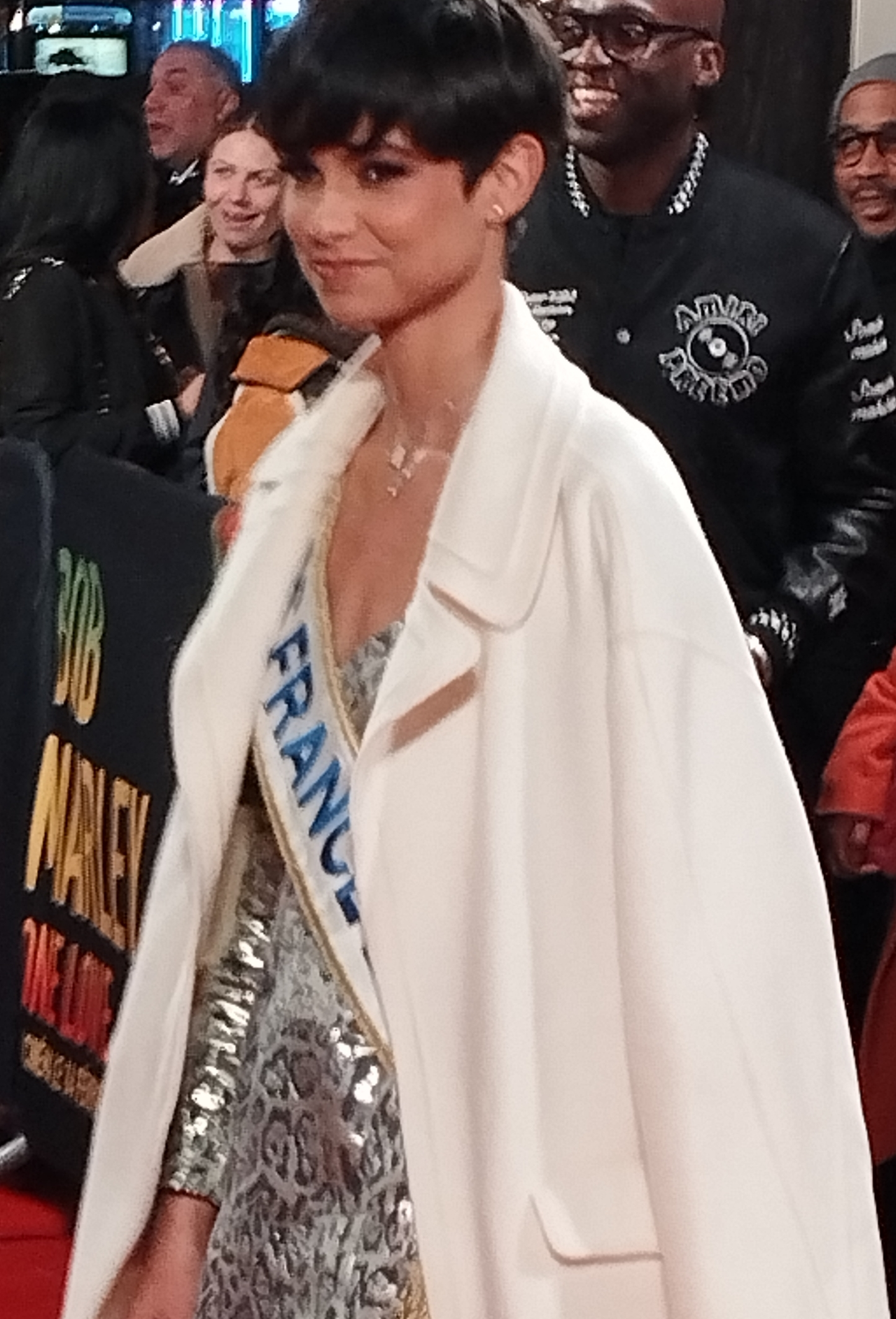
Miss France 2024
Eve Gilles

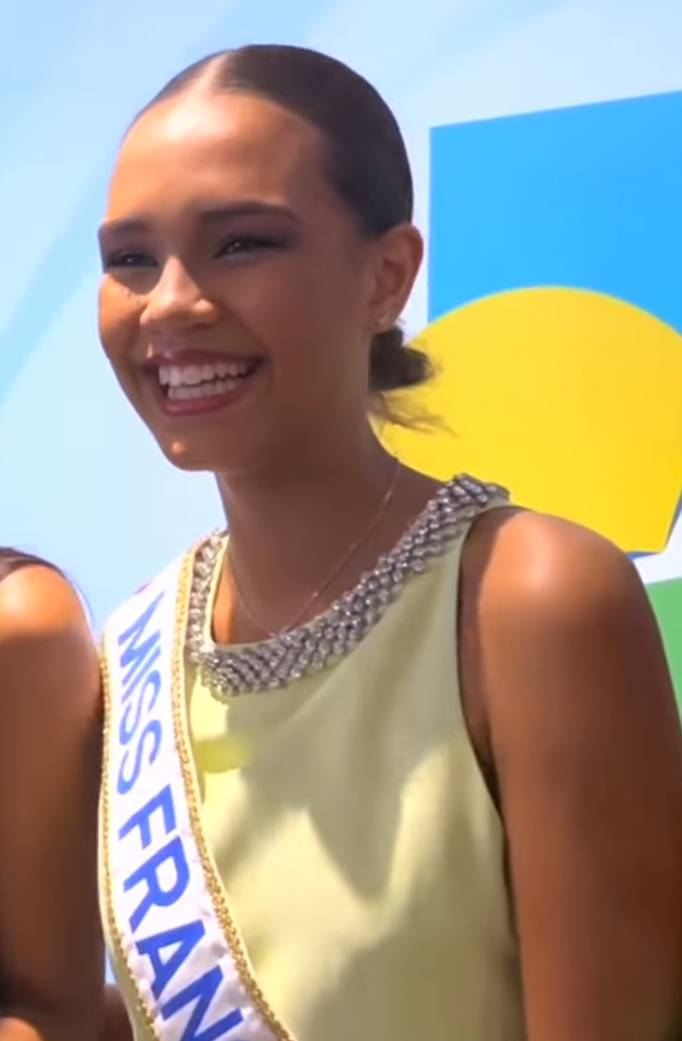
Miss France 2023
Indira Ampiot

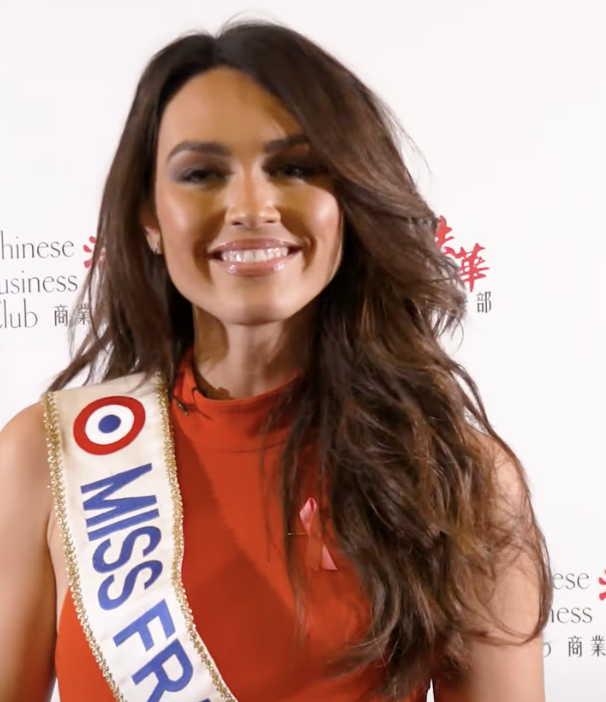
Miss France 2022
Diane Leyre

=== Winners by region ===
Number	Region	Years
16	Île-de-France	1933; 1934; 1935; 1939; 1948; 1949; 1950; 1955; 1963; 1970; 1972 (Note: In 1972, winner Chantal Bouvier de la Motte of Île-de-France resigned the title after suffering serious injuries after falling off of a horse. She was replaced by her first runner-up, Claudine Cassereau of Poitou-Charentes, as Miss France 1972.); 1978 (Note: In 1978, winner Pascale Taurua of New Caledonia resigned the title shortly after winning due to her wishing to remain in New Caledonia and not move to Paris. She was replaced by her first runner-up, Brigitte Konjovic of Île-de-France, as Miss France 1978.); 1983 (Note: In 1983, winner Isabelle Turpault of Île-de-France was dethroned after images taken of her in an erotic photoshoot were released, against pageant rules. She was replaced by her first runner-up, Frédérique Marcelle Leroy of Aquitaine, as Miss France 1983.); 1986; 1997; 2022
7	Normandy	1958; 1967; 1981; 1984; 2005; 2010; 2021
7	Rhône-Alpes	1930; 1957; 1965; 1968; 1988; 1996; 2002
7	Aquitaine	1920; 1931; 1952; 1983; 1989; 1990; 1995
6	(French Polynesia) Tahiti	1974; 1980 (Note: In 1980, winner Thilda Fuller of Tahiti resigned the title three days after winning due to personal reasons. She was replaced by her first runner-up, Patricia Barzyk of Franche-Comté, as Miss France 1980.); 1991; 1999; 2019; 2026
6	Alsace	1940; 1969; 1985; 1987; 2004; 2012
6	Brittany	1928; 1937; 1960; 1961; 1962; 2011
6	(Nice) Côte d'Azur	1932; 1947; 1951; 1954; 1966; 1982
4	Nord-Pas-de-Calais	2015; 2016; 2018; 2024
4	Guadeloupe	1993; 2003; 2020; 2023
4	Picardy	1936; 1953; 2001; 2007
3
3	Burgundy	1964 (Note: In 1964, winner Arlette Collot of Burgundy was dethroned after refusing to travel throughout France as part of her official duties. She was replaced by her first runner-up, Jacqueline Gayraud of Pays de la Loire, as Miss France 1964.); 2000; 2013
3	(Languedoc-Roussillon) Languedoc	1929; 1971; 2006
3	Lorraine	1973; 1975; 1998
3	Pays de la Loire	1964; 1992; 1994
3	Poitou-Charentes	1959; 1972; 1977
2	Réunion	1976; 2008
2	Franche-Comté	1927; 1980
1	Martinique	2025
1	French Guiana	2017
1	Centre-Val de Loire	2014
1	Midi-Pyrénées	2009
1	Provence	1979
1	New Caledonia	1978
1	Morocco (Note: Until 1956, Morocco was under control of France as the French Protectorate in Morocco.)	1956
1	Roussillon	1938
1	Saar (Note: Until 1935, Saarbrücken was part of the Territory of the Saar Basin, a region of Germany that was administered by the United Kingdom and France under the control of the League of Nations.)	1935
1	Corsica	1921
