= Miss Languedoc =

- Type: Beauty pageant
- Headquarters: Languedoc, France
- Members: Miss France
- Official language: French
- Regional director: Thierry Mazars
- Website: www.misslanguedoc.fr

Miss Languedoc (formerly Miss Languedoc-Roussillon) is a French beauty pageant which selects a representative for the Miss France national competition from the departments of Aude, Gard, Hérault and Lozère in the region of Languedoc-Roussillon. Until 2023, the organization was known as Miss Languedoc-Roussillon and also represented the department of Pyrénées-Orientales, sometimes through the Miss Roussillon sister pageant, until the department's separation into the independent Miss Roussillon organization. The first Miss Languedoc-Roussillon was crowned in 1976, although several women have represented the region with various other titles.

The current Miss Languedoc is Candice Gauch, who was crowned Miss Languedoc 2026 on 7 August 2026. Three women from Languedoc have been crowned Miss France:

- Madeleine Mourgues, who was crowned Miss France 1929, competing as Miss Languedoc-Roussillon
- Myriam Stocco, who was crowned Miss France 1971, competing as Miss Languedoc-Roussillon
- Alexandra Rosenfeld, who was crowned Miss France 2006

== Results summary ==
- Miss France: Madeleine Mourgues (1928; Miss Languedoc-Roussillon); Myriam Stocco (1970; Miss Languedoc-Roussillon); Alexandra Rosenfeld (2005; Miss Languedoc)
- 1st Runner-Up: Martine David (1978); Florence Dourdou (1979); Cathy Billaudeau (1985); Jenna Sylvestre (2010); Aurore Kichenin (2016; Miss Languedoc-Roussillon)
- 2nd Runner-Up: Stéphane Bracher (1986; Miss Camargue)
- 3rd Runner-Up: Rouja Chanon (1992; Miss Camargue)
- 4th Runner-Up: Violette Pena (1968; Miss Toulouse-Languedoc); Lætitia Guirodou (1983); Florence Olivier (1989; Miss Littoral Sud); Sandra Praduroux (1992; Miss Littoral Sud); Maxime Teissier (2023)
- 5th Runner-Up: Laure Mazon (2003; Miss Camargue-Cévennes); Lou Lambert (2025)
- 6th Runner-Up: Estelle Rouquette (2000; Miss Cévennes); Alison Cossenet (2011)
- Top 12/Top 15: Roseline Casal (1987; Miss Grande Motte); Anne-Laure Bastide (1995; Miss Cévennes); Céline Gimbert (1997); Céline Torrès (1997; Miss Camargue); Sabrina Dubois (1999; Miss Cévennes); Raphaelle Navarro (2000); Agnès Fouques (2001); Cindy Martinez (2004; Miss Camargue-Cévennes); Marie-Charlotte Méré (2005; Miss Camargue-Cévennes); Anaïs Franchini (2013); Léna Stachurski (2015); Alizée Rieu (2017; Miss Languedoc-Roussillon); Lola Brengues (2018; Miss Languedoc-Roussillon); Marion Ratié (2021; Miss Languedoc-Roussillon); Cameron Vallière (2022)

== Gallery ==
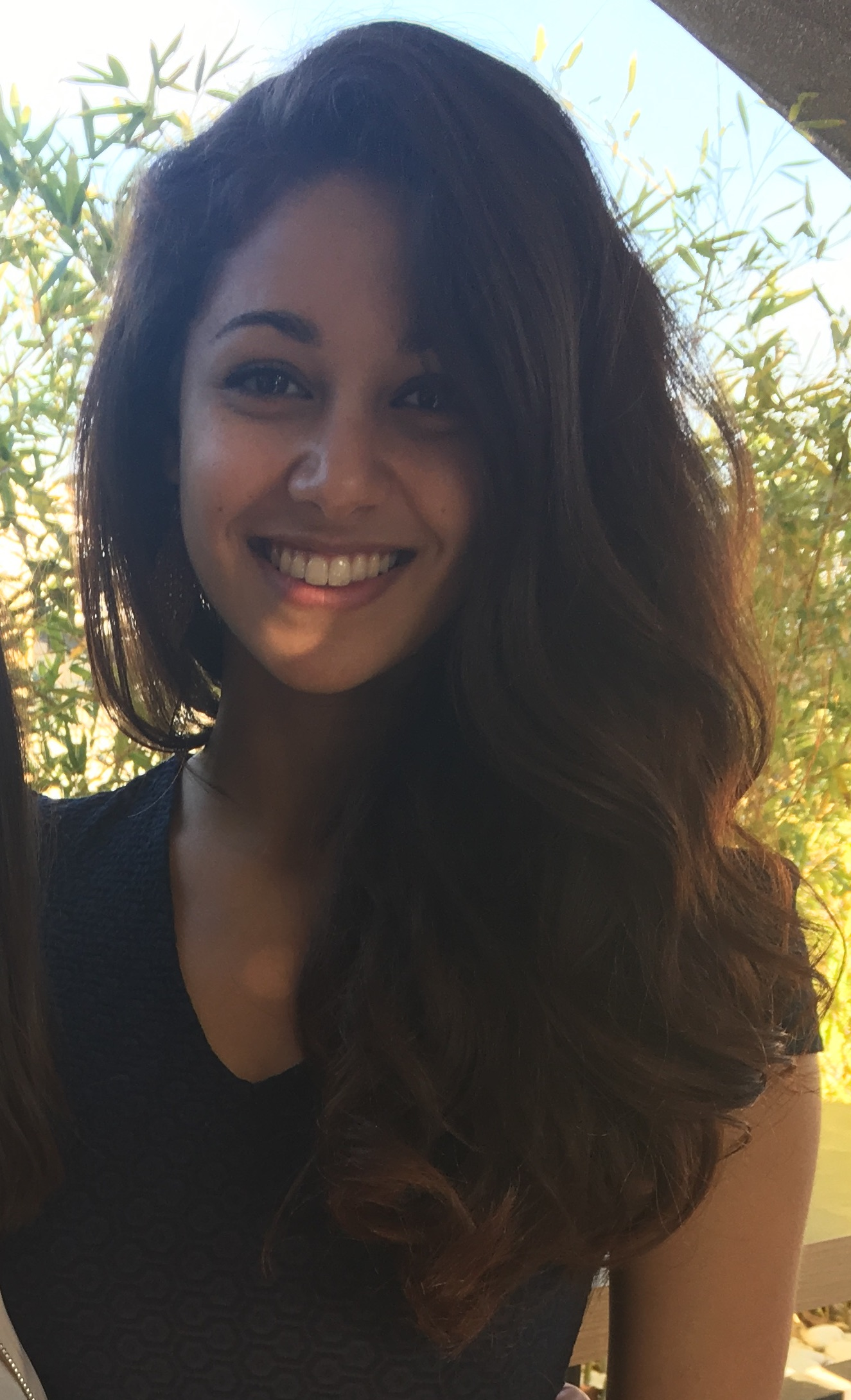
Miss Languedoc-Roussillon 2016
Aurore Kichenin

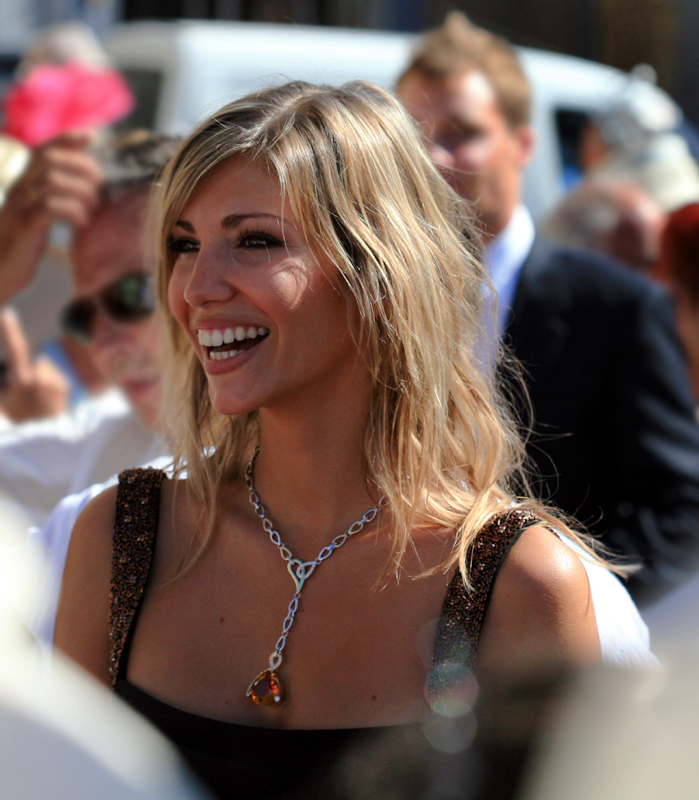
Miss Languedoc 2005 and Miss France 2006
Alexandra Rosenfeld

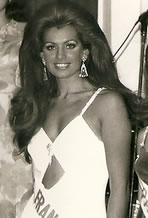
Miss Languedoc-Roussillon 1970 and Miss France 1971
Myriam Stocco

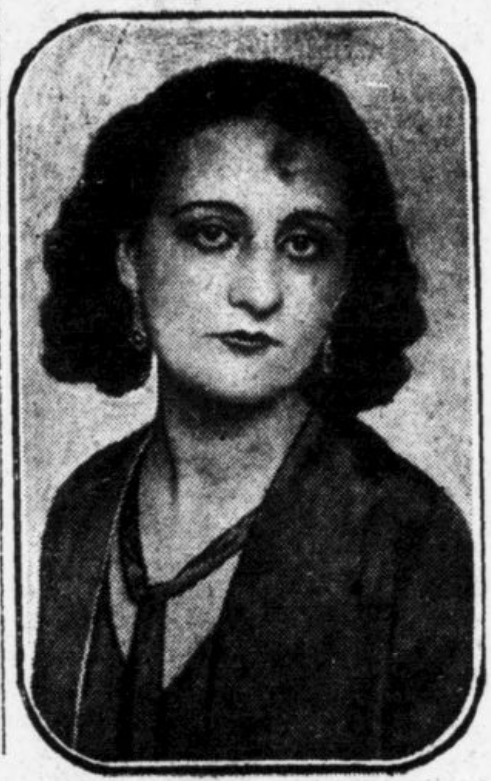
Miss Languedoc-Roussillon 1928 and Miss France 1929
Madeleine Mourgues

== Titleholders ==
Year	Name	Age (Note: Ages at the time of Miss France)	Height	Hometown	Miss France placement	Notes
2026	Candice Gauch	29	1.77 m (5 ft 9 1/2 in)	Mende	TBD	
2025	Lou Lambert	20	1.71 m (5 ft 7 1/2 in)	Mauguio	Top 12 (5th Runner-Up)	
2024	Jade Benazech	18	1.82 m (5 ft 11 1/2 in)	Sallèles-d'Aude		
2023	Maxime Teissier	20	1.73 m (5 ft 8 in)	Montpellier	4th Runner-Up	
2022	Cameron Vallière	23	1.74 m (5 ft 8 1/2 in)	Nîmes	Top 15	
2015	Léna Stachurski	20	1.74 m (5 ft 8 1/2 in)	Roquemaure	Top 12	
2014	Marie Fabre	22	1.70 m (5 ft 7 in)	Lattes		
2013	Anaïs Franchini	22	1.75 m (5 ft 9 in)	Narbonne	Top 12	
2012	Emmanuelle Fabre	22	1.73 m (5 ft 8 in)	Gignac		
2011	Alison Cossenet	19	1.72 m (5 ft 7 1/2 in)	Cournonsec	Top 12 (6th Runner-Up)	
2010	Jenna Sylvestre	22	1.71 m (5 ft 7 1/2 in)	Montpellier	1st Runner-Up	
2009	Manon Ricci	18	1.73 m (5 ft 8 in)	Montpellier		
2006	Stéphanie Pomarès	20	1.76 m (5 ft 9 1/2 in)	Lattes		
2005	Alexandra Rosenfeld	18	1.73 m (5 ft 8 in)	Saint-Thibéry	Miss France 2006	Competed at Miss Universe 2006
2002	Ismaëlle Allouane			Bellegarde		
2001	Agnès Fouques			Alès	Top 12	
2000	Raphaelle Navarro			Montpellier	Top 12	
1999	Carine Balestié	18	1.72 m (5 ft 7 1/2 in)	Lattes		
1998	Séverine Perpina	18	1.74 m (5 ft 8 1/2 in)	Mireval		
1997	Céline Gimbert	18	1.80 m (5 ft 11 in)	Béziers	Top 12	
1996	Carole Pagès					
1995	Laurence Bergonnier					
1994	Cynthia Kastener	22				
1993	Myriam Girardier					
1992	Céline Muratore	18				
1991	Stéphanie Santa					
1990	Catherine Galière					
1989	Sophie Bonnier					
1988	Sophie Lustro					
1987	Laurence Aimable					
1986	Nathalie Provenzano					
1985	Cathy Billaudeau				1st Runner-Up	
1983	Lætitia Guirodou				4th Runner-Up	
1979	Florence Dourdou				1st Runner-Up	
1978	Martine David				1st Runner-Up	
1976	Myriam Sokja					

=== Miss Languedoc-Roussillon ===
For several years, the entire region of Languedoc-Roussillon sent one sole contestant under the title Miss Languedoc-Roussillon.

Year	Name	Age	Height	Hometown	Miss France placement	Notes
2021	Marion Ratié	20	1.72 m (5 ft 7 1/2 in)	Redessan	Top 15	
2020	Illana Barry	19	1.76 m (5 ft 9 1/2 in)	Aigues-Mortes		
2019	Lucie Caussanel	18	1.80 m (5 ft 11 in)	Montblanc		
2018	Lola Brengues	19	1.77 m (5 ft 9 1/2 in)	Congénies	Top 12	
2017	Alizée Rieu	21	1.73 m (5 ft 8 in)	Vallabrix	Top 12	
2016	Aurore Kichenin	22	1.74 m (5 ft 8 1/2 in)	Jacou	1st Runner-Up	Top 5 at Miss World 2017
2008	Cindy Filipiak	22	1.78 m (5 ft 10 in)	Perpignan		
2007	Florence d'Odorico	21	1.82 m (5 ft 11 1/2 in)	Nîmes		
2004	Charlotte Ledet	20	1.72 m (5 ft 7 1/2 in)			
2003	Stéphanie Gamba					
1970	Myriam Stocco			Beaucaire	Miss France 1971	Top 12 at Miss Universe 1971 Top 7 at Miss World 1971
1928	Madeleine Mourgues	22			Miss France 1929	

=== Miss Camargue ===
From the 1980s to 2000s, the region also crowned a representative under the title Miss Camargue.

Year	Name	Age	Height	Hometown	Miss France placement	Notes
2002	Élodie Canville					
2001	Magali Savé			Uzès		
2000	Frédérique Noël			Chaudeyrac		
1999	Audrey Marbouty	18	1.75 m (5 ft 9 in)			
1998	Marion Perbost	18	1.75 m (5 ft 9 in)			
1997	Céline Torrès	20	1.73 m (5 ft 8 in)	Nîmes	Top 12	
1996	Sandrine Montagud			Teyran		
1995	Sylviane Renaudeau					
1994	Armelle Rigaud					
1992	Rouja Chanon	18			3rd Runner-Up	
1991	Laure Dethon					
1989	Michèle Meyer					
1986	Stéphane Bracher				2nd Runner-Up	
1985	Françoise Coulon					

=== Miss Cévennes ===
From the 1990s to 2000s, the region also crowned a representative under the title Miss Cévennes.

Year	Name	Age	Height	Hometown	Miss France placement	Notes
2002	Sophie Larmignat					
2001	Sophie Pépin			Caveirac		
2000	Estelle Rouquette			Frontignan	Top 12 (6th Runner-Up)	
1999	Sabrina Dubois	18	1.81 m (5 ft 11 1/2 in)	Anduze	Top 12	
1998	Christelle Goeury	22	1.78 m (5 ft 10 in)			
1997	Laurence Lamy	18	1.72 m (5 ft 7 1/2 in)	Nîmes		
1995	Anne-Laure Bastide				Top 12	
1994	Karine Saysset					

=== Miss Littoral Sud ===
From the 1980s to 1990s, the region also crowned a representative under the title Miss Littoral Sud.

Year	Name	Age	Height	Hometown	Miss France placement	Notes
1992	Sandra Praduroux	22			4th Runner-Up	
1991	Lucille Viguier					
1990	Catherine Cambon					
1989	Florence Olivier				4th Runner-Up	
1988	Carole Mondon					
1987	Caroline Bruno					
1985	Françoise Torres					

=== Miss Grande Motte ===
From the 1970s to 1980s, the region also crowned a representative under the title Miss Grande Motte.

Year	Name	Age	Height	Hometown	Miss France placement	Notes
1987	Roseline Casal				Top 12	
1979	Véronique Crouail					
1978	Florence Dourdou					
1977	Béatrice Ladenos					
1976	Corinne Maury					

=== Miss Camargue-Cévennes ===
From 2003 to 2005, the region also crowned a representative under the title Miss Camargue-Cévennes.

Year	Name	Age	Height	Hometown	Miss France placement	Notes
2005	Marie-Charlotte Méré	18	1.76 m (5 ft 9 1/2 in)	Carcassonne	Top 12	Competed at Miss International 2006
2004	Cindy Martinez			Alès	Top 12	
2003	Laure Mazon				Top 12 (5th Runner-Up)	

=== Miss Lozère ===
In 1970, the department of Lozère crowned its own representative for Miss France.

Year	Name	Age	Height	Hometown	Miss France placement	Notes
1970	Françoise Saubert					

=== Miss Toulouse-Languedoc ===
In 1968, the regions of Languedoc-Roussillon and Midi-Pyrénées crowned a shared representative under the title Miss Toulouse-Languedoc.

Year	Name	Age	Height	Hometown	Miss France placement	Notes
1968	Violette Pena				4th Runner-Up	
