= Lembras =

- Commune
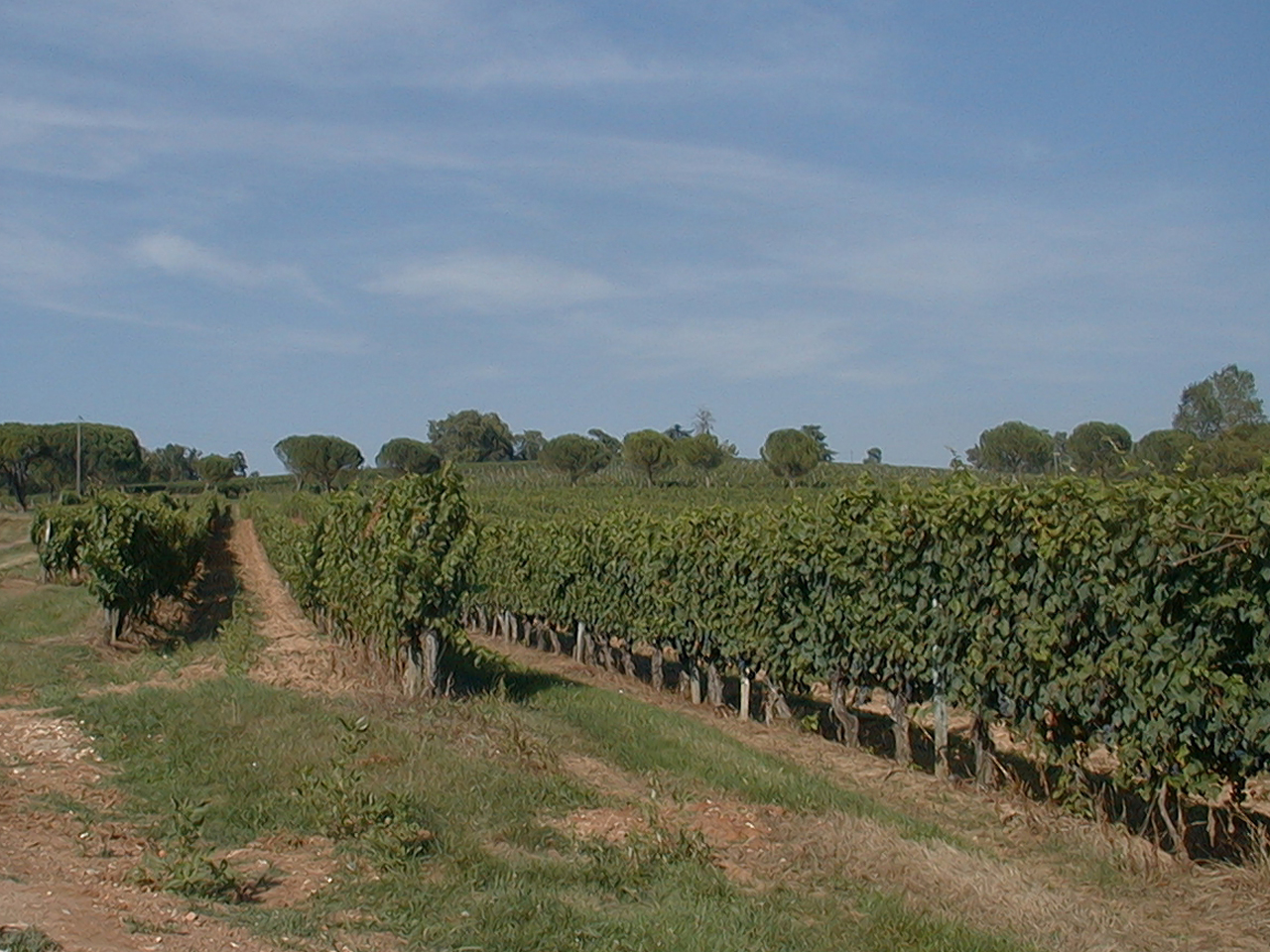
- A vineyard in Lembras

- Coat of arms
- Location of Lembras
- Location within France Location within Nouvelle-Aquitaine
- Coordinates: 44°53′07″N 0°31′28″E
- Country: France
- Region: Nouvelle-Aquitaine
- Department: Dordogne
- Arrondissement: Bergerac
- Canton: Bergerac-2
- Intercommunality: CA Bergeracoise

Government
  - Mayor (2020–2026): Michel Terreaux
- Area^{1}: 10.59 km^{2} (4.09 sq mi)
- Highest elevation: 155 m (509 ft)
- Lowest elevation: 39 m (128 ft)
- Population (2023): 1,259
  - Density: 118.9/km^{2} (307.9/sq mi)
- Time zone: UTC+01:00 (CET)
  - Summer (DST): UTC+02:00 (CEST)
- INSEE/Postal code: 24237 /24100
- ^{1} French Land Register data, which excludes lakes, ponds, glaciers > 1 km^{2} (0.386 sq mi or 247 acres) and river estuaries.

Lembras (French pronunciation: [lɛ̃bʁa]; Occitan: Lembrac) is a commune in the Dordogne department in Nouvelle-Aquitaine in southwestern France.

== Population ==
Historical population
Year	Pop.	±% p.a.
1968	597	—
1975	723	+2.77%
1982	977	+4.39%
1990	1,174	+2.32%
1999	1,194	+0.19%
2007	1,167	−0.29%
2012	1,243	+1.27%
2017	1,142	−1.68%
2023	1,259	+1.64%
Source: INSEE

== See also ==
- Communes of the Dordogne department
