= Miss France 2022 =

92nd Miss France competition, national beauty pageant edition

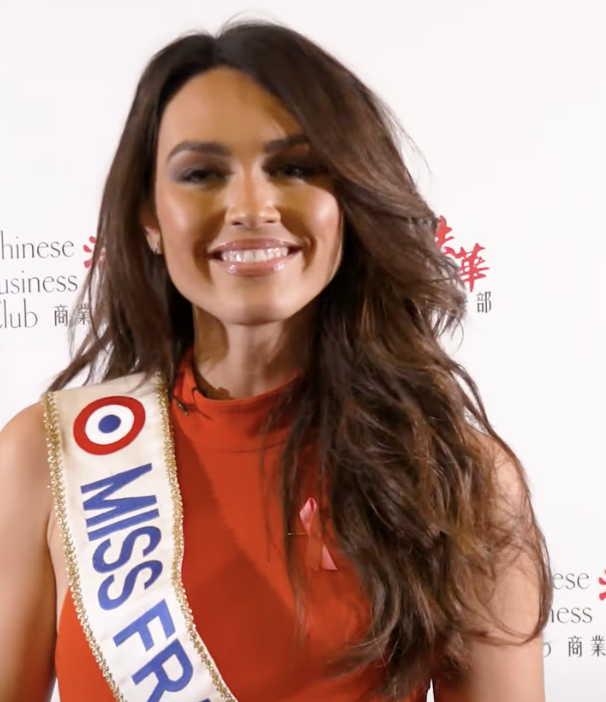
- Miss France 2022, Diane Leyre
- Date: 11 December 2021
- Presenters: Jean-Pierre Foucault; Sylvie Tellier
- Venue: Zénith de Caen, Caen, Normandy
- Broadcaster: TF1; MyTF1
- Entrants: 29
- Placements: 15
- Withdrawals: Wallis and Futuna
- Returns: Tahiti
- Winner: Diane Leyre; Île de France
- Congeniality: Mélysa Stephenson; French Guiana
- Photogenic: Julie Bève; Limousin

Miss France 2022 was the 92nd edition of the Miss France pageant, held at the Zénith de Caen in Caen, Normandy, on 11 December 2021.

Amandine Petit of Normandy crowned Diane Leyre of Île-de-France. Leyre represented France at Miss Universe 2023 held in El Salvador.

== Background ==
=== Location ===
By July 2021, the Zénith de Caen in Caen had confirmed that the venue was scheduled to host the Miss France 2022 competition on 11 December 2021, although this had not been confirmed by the Miss France Committee. On 31 August, it was officially confirmed that the competition would be held at the Zénith de Caen on 11 December.

On 28 August 2021, Sylvie Tellier confirmed that the annual overseas trip for the delegates would return if COVID-19 restrictions allowed for it, with the delegates visiting Réunion. They ultimately did visit Réunion for a variety of events, before going to Caen to begin rehearsals.

=== Selection of contestants ===
After having withdrawn from the 2021 edition due to the COVID-19 pandemic, Tahiti returned to the competition. However, Wallis and Futuna withdrew from the competition, after having returned for the first time since 2005 in the 2021 edition. In September 2021, the committee confirmed through their Facebook account that their withdrawal was due to the COVID-19 pandemic in New Caledonia, where the regional committee for Wallis and Futuna was headquartered.

On 17 November, it was confirmed in a press conference that the 29 contestants would be given labour contracts for the first time, amidst controversy regarding the labour laws and unpaid nature of taking part in the competition in past years.

== Results ==
Placement	Contestant
Miss France 2022	Île-de-France – Diane Leyre
1st Runner-Up	Martinique – Floriane Bascou
2nd Runner-Up	Alsace – Cécile Wolfrom
3rd Runner-Up	(French Polynesia) Tahiti – Tumateata Buisson
4th Runner-Up	Normandy – Youssra Askry
Top 15 (Note: The Top 15 semifinalists are listed in the order that they placed according to the official results.)	Aquitaine – Ambre Andrieu (5th Runner-Up); Réunion – Dana Virin (6th Runner-Up); Nord-Pas-de-Calais – Donatella Meden; Rhône-Alpes – Charlotte Faure; (Nice) Côte d'Azur – Valeria Pavelin; Lorraine – Marine Sauvage; Pays de la Loire – Line Carvalho; French Guiana – Mélysa Stephenson; Corsica – Emma Renucci; Languedoc-Roussillon – Marion Ratié

=== Special awards ===
Prize	Contestant
General Culture Award	Normandy – Youssra Askry (17/20) (Note: The General Culture Award is given to the contestant with the highest score on the general culture exam, which tests contestants' grasp of topics such as history, politics, current events, and pop culture. Miss Normandy received the highest score of 17 and was thus given the award.)
Best Regional Costume	Pays de la Loire – Line Carvalho
Miss Photogenic	Limousin – Julie Bève
Miss Congeniality	French Guiana – Mélysa Stephenson
Catwalk Award	Martinique – Floriane Bascou
Elegance Award	Picardy – Hayate El Gharmaoui
Model Award	Burgundy – Chloé Galissi

=== Scoring ===
==== Preliminaries ====
A jury composed of partners (internal and external) of the Miss France Committee selected fifteen delegates during an interview that took place on 8 December to advance to the semifinals.

==== Top 15 ====
In the top fifteen, a 50/50 split vote between the official jury and voting public selected five delegates to advance to the top five. Each delegate was awarded an overall score of 1 to 15 from the jury and public, and the five delegates with the highest combined scores advanced to the top five. The delegates with the sixth and seventh highest combined scores were afterwards designated as the fifth and sixth runners-up, respectively, despite not advancing in the competition. In the case of a tie, the jury vote prevailed.

Contestant	Public	Jury	Total
Île-de-France	14	15	29
Tahiti	11	15	26
Martinique	15	9	24
Normandy	10	13	23
Alsace	12	9	21
Aquitaine	8	12	20
Réunion	7	12	19
Nord-Pas-de-Calais	6	12	18
Rhône-Alpes	13	4	17
(Nice) Côte d'Azur	9	7	16
Lorraine	3	7	10
Pays de la Loire	2	7	9
French Guiana	5	4	9
Corsica	4	4	8
Languedoc-Roussillon	1	4	5

==== Top five ====
In the top five, a 50/50 split vote between the official jury and voting public determined which contestant was declared Miss France. This was the second year that voting was conducted this way, following a rule change in the 2021 edition. Each contestant was ranked from first to fifth by the jury and public, and the two scores were combined to create a total score. In the case of a tie, the public vote prevailed. If this rule change had not occurred, Martinique would have won, while Alsace would have been first runner-up, followed by Île-de-France, Tahiti, and then Normandy.

#	Candidate	Public	Jury	Total
1	Île-de-France	3	5	8
2	Martinique	5	1	6
3	Alsace	4	2	6
4	(French Polynesia) Tahiti	2	4	6
5	Normandy	1	4	5

== Pageant ==
=== Format ===
On 17 November, it was announced in a press conference that the theme for this edition of the competition would be musical theatre and musical films, with competition rounds being inspired by various notable musical theatre shows and films.

The competition opened with an introduction themed after The Lion King. The 29 contestants were initially separated into three groups, two consisting of ten contestants and one of nine, with each group taking part in an initial presentation round. The three presentation rounds were themed after Mamma Mia!, Mary Poppins, and West Side Story, respectively. Afterwards, the 29 contestants presented their regional costumes, created by local designers from their home regions, in a round inspired by Singin' in the Rain. The 29 contestants subsequently participated in the one-piece swimsuit round, inspired by La La Land.

After that, the Top 15 were announced, and they competed in the two-piece swimsuit round inspired by Chicago. Then the Top Five were announced and presented their evening gowns in a round inspired by Broadway theatre. After the final question round, the Top Five participated in their final presentation round, inspired by Aladdin, before the final results were revealed.

=== Judges ===
- Jean-Pierre Pernaut (President of the Jury) – journalist and reporter
- François Alu – dancer
- Amel Bent – singer and actress
- Philippe Lacheau – actor
- Inès Reg – comedian
- Ahmed Sylla – comedian and actor
- Delphine Wespiser – Miss France 2012 from Alsace

== Contestants ==
The 29 delegates were:

Region	Contestant	Age (Note: Ages at the time of the pageant)	Height	Hometown	Placement	Notes
Alsace	Cécile Wolfrom	24	1.75 m (5 ft 9 in)	Strasbourg	2nd Runner-Up	
Aquitaine	Ambre Andrieu	22	1.78 m (5 ft 10 in)	Bordeaux	Top 15	
Auvergne	Anaïs Werestchack	24	1.77 m (5 ft 9 1/2 in)	Beaumont		
Brittany	Sarah Conan	22	1.73 m (5 ft 8 in)	Lézardrieux		
Burgundy	Chloé Galissi	21	1.72 m (5 ft 7 1/2 in)	Chalon-sur-Saône		
Centre-Val de Loire	Jade Lange	19	1.75 m (5 ft 9 in)	Malesherbes		
Champagne-Ardenne	Léna Massinger	20	1.70 m (5 ft 7 in)	Reims		
Corsica	Emma Renucci	19	1.76 m (5 ft 9 1/2 in)	Bastia	Top 15	
(Nice) Côte d'Azur	Valeria Pavelin	24	1.85 m (6 ft 1 in)	Nice	Top 15	Sister of Maria Pavelin, Miss Côte d'Azur 2016
Franche-Comté	Julie Cretin	21	1.70 m (5 ft 7 in)	Bouverans		
French Guiana	Mélysa Stephenson	19	1.71 m (5 ft 7 1/2 in)	Remire-Montjoly	Top 15	
Guadeloupe	Ludivine Edmond	20	1.76 m (5 ft 9 1/2 in)	Gourbeyre		
Île-de-France	Diane Leyre	24	1.77 m (5 ft 9 1/2 in)	Paris	Miss France 2022	
Languedoc-Roussillon	Marion Ratié	20	1.72 m (5 ft 7 1/2 in)	Redessan	Top 15	
Limousin	Julie Bève	23	1.71 m (5 ft 7 1/2 in)	Meilhards		
Lorraine	Marine Sauvage	23	1.75 m (5 ft 9 in)	Ars-sur-Moselle	Top 15	
Martinique	Floriane Bascou	19	1.71 m (5 ft 7 1/2 in)	Le Lamentin	1st Runner-Up	Sister of track and field athlete Dimitri Bascou
Mayotte	Anna Ousseni	24	1.70 m (5 ft 7 in)	Sada		
Midi-Pyrénées	Hannah Friconnet	22	1.70 m (5 ft 7 in)	Labruguière		
New Caledonia	Emmy Chenin	18	1.76 m (5 ft 9 1/2 in)	La Foa		
Nord-Pas-de-Calais	Donatella Meden	21	1.74 m (5 ft 8 1/2 in)	Lambersart	Top 15	
Normandy	Youssra Askry	24	1.72 m (5 ft 7 1/2 in)	Rouen	4th Runner-Up	
Pays de la Loire	Line Carvalho	20	1.81 m (5 ft 11 1/2 in)	Blain	Top 15	
Picardy	Hayate El Gharmaoui	21	1.72 m (5 ft 7 1/2 in)	Compiègne		Member of the Compiègne Municipal Council, elected in 2020
Poitou-Charentes	Lolita Ferrari	24	1.71 m (5 ft 7 1/2 in)	Rochefort		
Provence	Eva Navarro	19	1.70 m (5 ft 7 in)	Istres		
Réunion	Dana Virin	22	1.73 m (5 ft 8 in)	Sainte-Suzanne	Top 15	
Rhône-Alpes	Charlotte Faure	20	1.72 m (5 ft 7 1/2 in)	Biviers	Top 15	
(French Polynesia) Tahiti	Tumateata Buisson	24	1.81 m (5 ft 11 1/2 in)	Paea	3rd Runner-Up	
