= Miss Alsace =

French regional beauty pageant

- Purpose: Beauty pageant
- Headquarters: Alsace, France
- Official language: French
- Regional director: Céline Rueher
- Affiliations: Miss France

Miss Alsace is a French beauty pageant which selects a representative for the Miss France national competition from the region of Alsace. The first Miss Alsace was crowned in 1939, although the competition was not organized regularly until 1984.

The current Miss Alsace is Chiara Blazevic, who was crowned Miss Alsace 2026 on 14 June 2026. Six women from Alsace have been crowned Miss France:

- Joséphine Ladwig, 1940
- Suzanne Angly, 1969
- Suzanne Iskandar, 1985
- Nathalie Marquay, 1987
- Lætitia Bléger, 2004
- Delphine Wespiser, 2012

== Results summary ==
- Miss France: Joséphine Ladwig (1939); Suzanne Angly (1968); Suzanne Iskandar (1984); Nathalie Marquay (1986); Lætitia Bléger (2003); Delphine Wespiser (2011)
- 1st Runner-Up: Irène Hell (1966); Claudia Frittolini (1987); Dorothée Lambert (1988)
- 2nd Runner-Up: Evelyne Ricket (1957); Sonia Kielwasser (1967); Cécile Wolfrom (2021)
- 3rd Runner-Up: Anne Jandera (1991); Aurélie Roux (2020)
- 4th Runner-Up: Martine Scheffler (1971); Alyssa Wurtz (2014)
- 6th Runner-Up: Florima Treiber (2007)
- Top 12/Top 15: Régine Hubert (1990); Paola Palermo (1992); Barbara Fink (1999); Tiffany Rohrbach (2000); Céline Druz (2002); Stéphanie Wawrzyniak (2006); Laura Strubel (2013); Laura Muller (2015); Claire Godard (2016); Laura Theodori (2019); Isabella Hebert (2024)

== Gallery ==
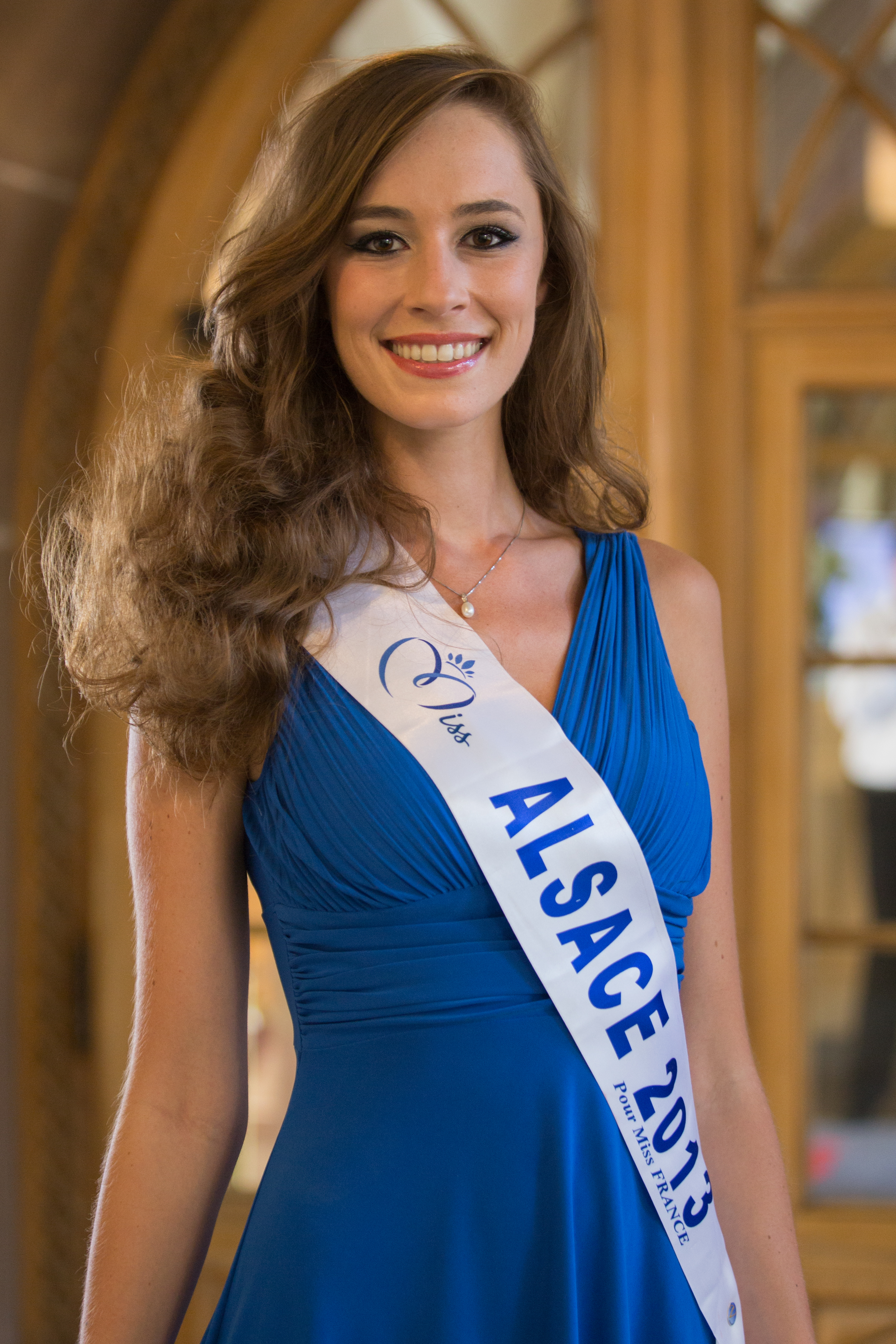
Laura Strubel, 2013

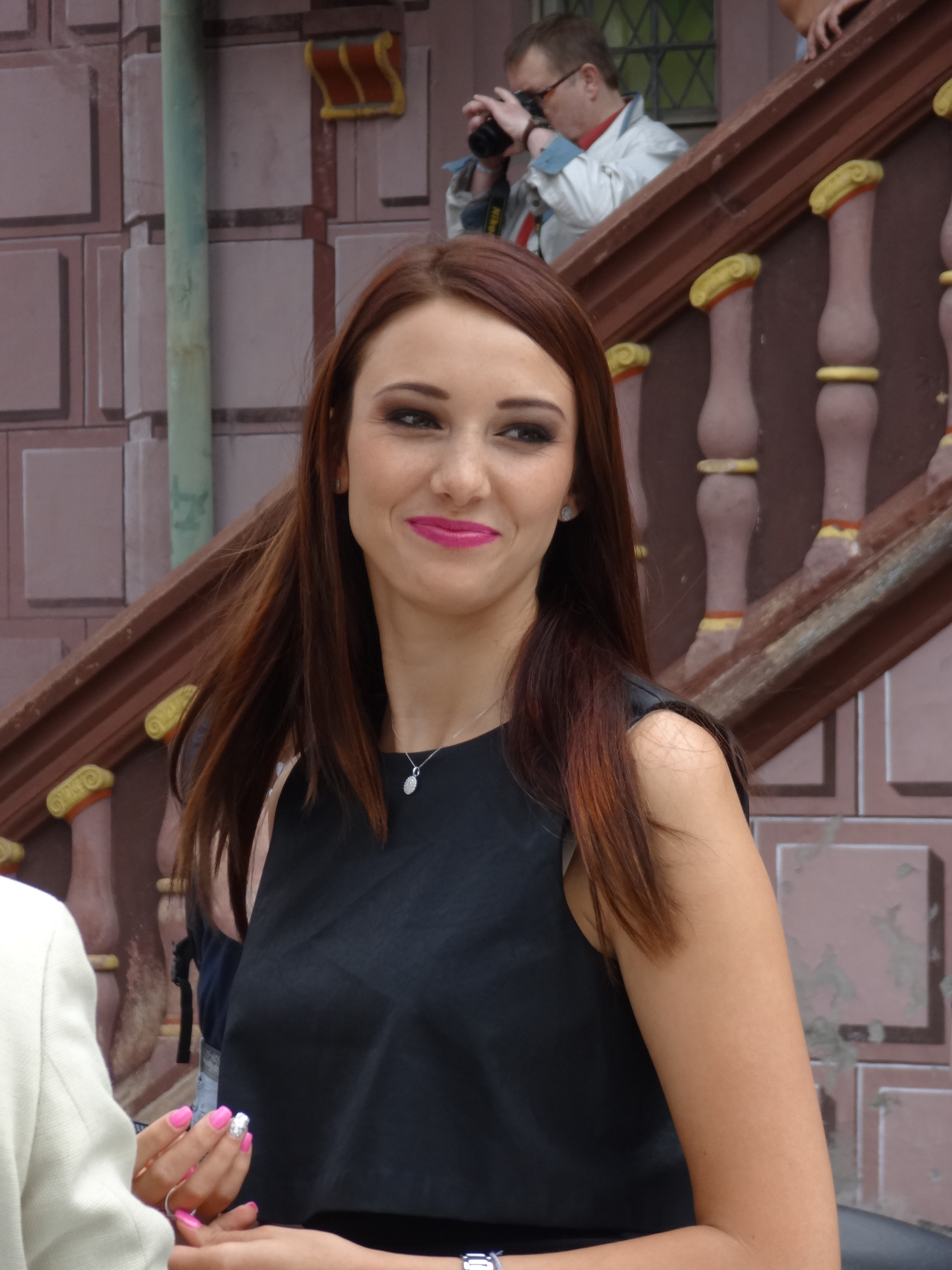
Delphine Wespiser, 2011 and Miss France 2012

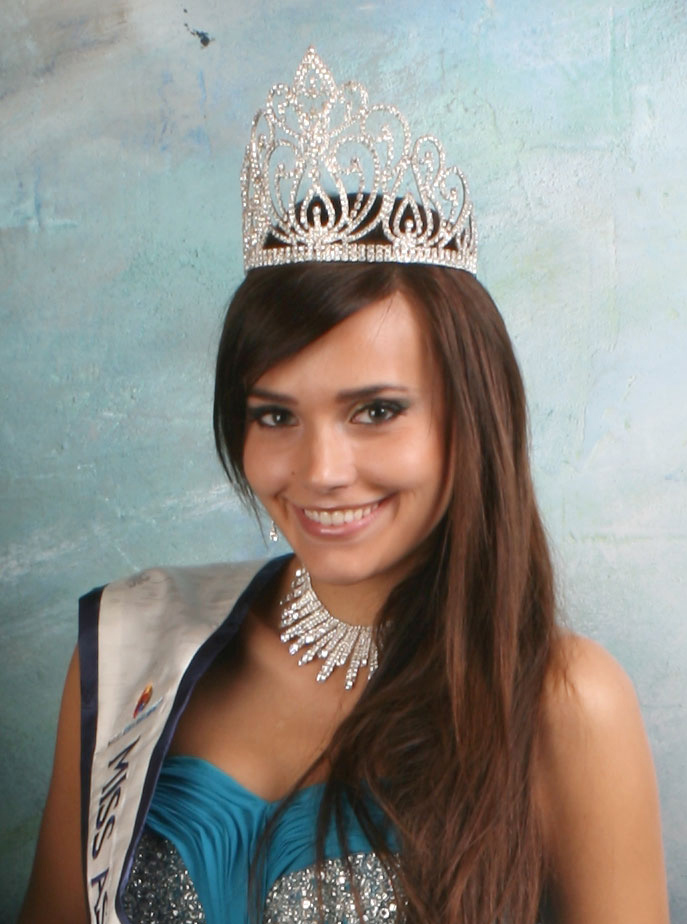
Florima Treiber, 2007

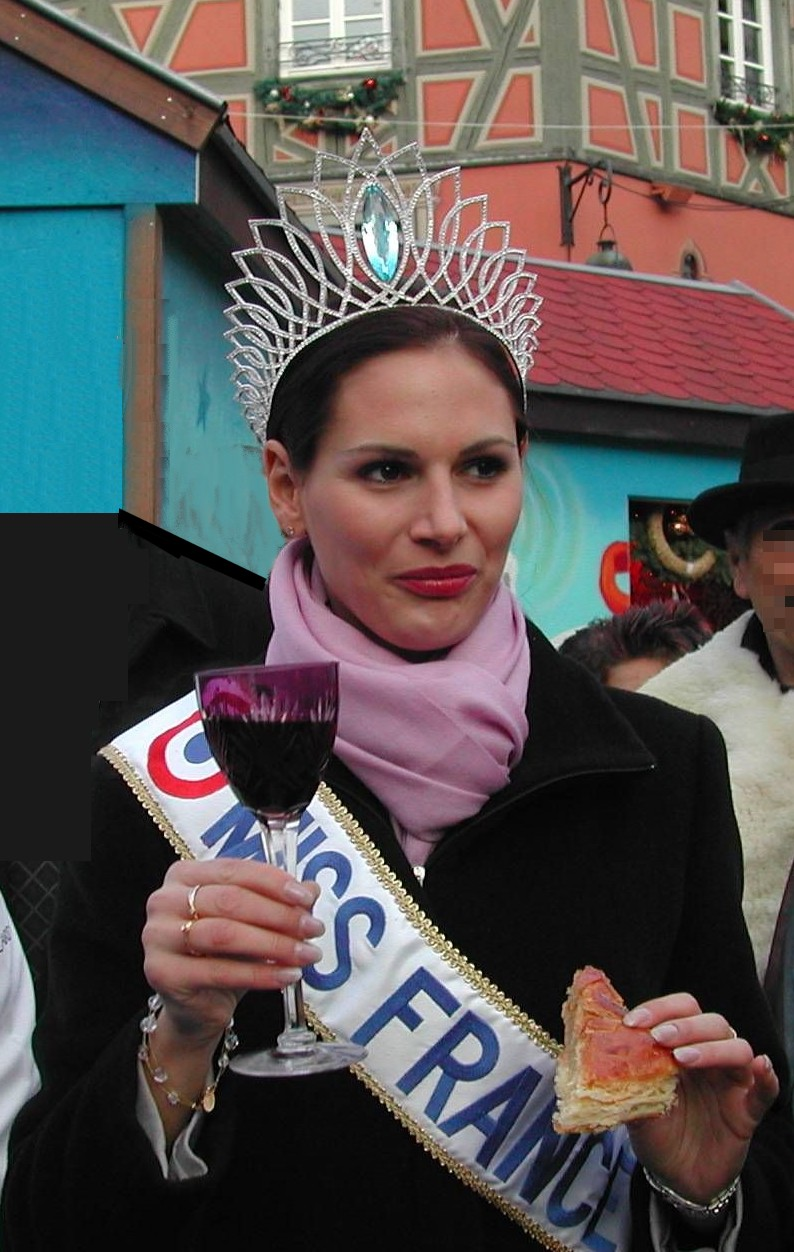
Lætitia Bléger, 2003 and Miss France 2004

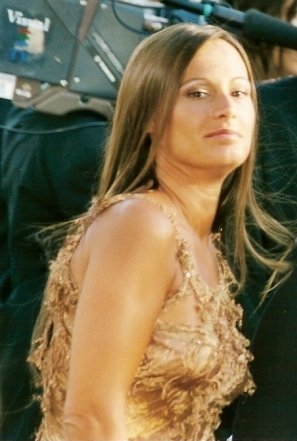
Nathalie Marquay, 1986 and Miss France 1987

== Titleholders ==
Year	Name	Age (Note: Ages at the time of Miss France)	Height	Hometown	Miss France placement	Notes
2026	Chiara Blazevic	24	1.76 m (5 ft 9 1/2 in)	Rantzwiller	TBD	
2025	Julie Decroix	21	1.75 m (5 ft 9 in)	Blotzheim		
2024	Isabella Hebert	20	1.71 m (5 ft 7 1/2 in)	Mundolsheim	Top 15	
2023	Adeline Vetter	27	1.71 m (5 ft 7 1/2 in)	Rossfeld		
2022	Camille Sedira	21	1.76 m (5 ft 9 1/2 in)	Bischoffsheim		
2021	Cécile Wolfrom	24	1.75 m (5 ft 9 in)	Strasbourg	2nd Runner-Up	
2020	Aurélie Roux	24	1.72 m (5 ft 7 1/2 in)	Spechbach-le-Bas	3rd Runner-Up	
2019	Laura Theodori	23	1.72 m (5 ft 7 1/2 in)	Strasbourg	Top 15	
2018	Léa Reboul	22	1.74 m (5 ft 8 1/2 in)	Lingolsheim		
2017	Joséphine Meisberger	21	1.70 m (5 ft 7 in)	Colmar		
2016	Claire Godard	19	1.81 m (5 ft 11 1/2 in)	Riedisheim	Top 12	
2015	Laura Muller	19	1.71 m (5 ft 7 1/2 in)	Sélestat	Top 12	
2014	Alyssa Wurtz	24	1.75 m (5 ft 9 in)	Drusenheim	4th Runner-Up	Top 16 at Miss Earth 2015
2013	Laura Strubel	24	1.82 m (5 ft 11 1/2 in)	Urmatt	Top 12	
2012	Emilie Koenig	22	1.72 m (5 ft 7 1/2 in)	Griesheim-près-Molsheim		
2011	Delphine Wespiser	19	1.75 m (5 ft 9 in)	Magstatt-le-Bas	Miss France 2012	Competed at Miss World 2012
2010	Mathilde Buecher	19	1.78 m (5 ft 10 in)	Heimersdorf		
2009	Sophie Mathes	19	1.72 m (5 ft 7 1/2 in)	Strasbourg		
2008	Carole Weyrich	22	1.77 m (5 ft 9 1/2 in)	Durningen		
2007	Florima Treiber	20	1.80 m (5 ft 11 in)	Colmar	Top 12 (6th Runner-Up)	Top 15 at Miss International 2010
2006	Stéphanie Wawrzyniak	20	1.75 m (5 ft 9 in)	Wittenheim	Top 12	
2005	Jessica Barazzutti	18	1.74 m (5 ft 8 1/2 in)	Ottmarsheim		
2004	Delphine Walter	23	1.76 m (5 ft 9 1/2 in)			
2003	Lætitia Bléger	22	1.72 m (5 ft 7 1/2 in)	Saint-Hippolyte	Miss France 2004	Competed at Miss Universe 2004
2002	Céline Druz				Top 12	
2001	Julie Nobel					
2000	Tiffany Rohrbach			Guebwiller	Top 12	
1999	Barbara Fink			Brumath	Top 12	
1998	Cindy Wolff					
1997	Séverine Baldo					
1996	Lara Maringer			Strasbourg		
1995	Céline Duffort			Dossenheim-sur-Zinsel		
1994	Sandra Schumacher					
1993	Maithé Meyer					
1992	Paola Palermo				Top 12	
1991	Anne Jandera			Bischheim	3rd Runner-Up	
1990	Régine Hubert			Herbsheim	Top 12	
1989	Anita Guerra					
1988	Dorothée Lambert				1st Runner-Up	Competed at Miss International 1989
1987	Claudia Frittolini				1st Runner-Up	Competed at Miss World 1988 Competed at Miss Universe 1988
1986	Nathalie Marquay	19	1.77 m (5 ft 9 1/2 in)	Wittenheim	Miss France 1987	Competed at Miss Universe 1987 Top 12 at Miss World 1987 Top 15 at Miss International 1988 Competed at Miss Europe 1988
1985	Joëlle Lévy					
1984	Suzanne Iskandar	20	1.79 m (5 ft 10 1/2 in)	Lingolsheim	Miss France 1985	Competed in Miss Universe 1985
1979	Marie-Laure Flock					
1978	Lydia Traquandi			Illhaeusern		
1977	Sylvie Obrist					
1976	Doris Horn					
1973	Karine Axtmann					
1971	Martine Scheffler				4th Runner-Up	
1969	Isabelle Grosjean			Schiltigheim		
1968	Suzanne Angly	17	1.68 m (5 ft 6 in)	Mulhouse	Miss France 1969	Top 15 at Miss World 1969 Top 15 at Miss International 1972
1967	Sonia Kielwasser				2nd Runner-Up	
1966	Irène Hell				1st Runner-Up	
1962	Maïté Vernier					
1957	Evelyne Ricket				2nd Runner-Up	
1939	Joséphine Ladwig	16		Bischwiller	Miss France 1940	
