= Miss Réunion =

French beauty contest

- Type: Beauty pageant
- Headquarters: Réunion, France
- Members: Miss France
- Official language: French
- Regional director: Aziz Patel
- Website: www.missreunion.fr

Miss Réunion is a French beauty pageant which selects a representative for the Miss France national competition from the overseas region of Réunion. The competition was first held in 1957, but was not organized regularly until 1974.

The current Miss Réunion is Laetitia Roguet, who was crowned Miss Réunion 2026 on 22 August 2026. Two women from Réunion have been crowned Miss France:

- Monique Uldaric, who was crowned Miss France 1976
- Valérie Bègue, who was crowned Miss France 2008

== Results summary ==
- Miss France: Monique Uldaric (1975); Valérie Bègue (2007)
- 1st Runner-Up: Joëlle Ramyead (1986)
- 2nd Runner-Up: Évelyne Pongérard (1976); Kelly Hoarau (1977); Isabelle Jacquemart (1978); Corine Lauret (1994); Raïssa Boyer (2006); Marie Payet (2011)
- 3rd Runner-Up: Myrose Hoareau (1979); Élodie Lebon (2005); Morgane Soucramanien (2018)
- 4th Runner-Up: Élodie Surray (1999); Azuima Issa (2015); Audrey Chane Pao Kan (2017)
- 5th Runner-Up: Virginie Benoîte (2004); Ambre Nguyen (2016); Lyna Boyer (2020)
- 6th Runner-Up: Raïssa Law Wan (2001); Dana Virin (2021)
- Top 12/Top 15: Bernadette Orboin (1974); Brigitte Adam (1991); Delphine Courteaud (2008); Vanille M'Doihoma (2013); Marie-Morgane Lebon (2019)

== Gallery ==
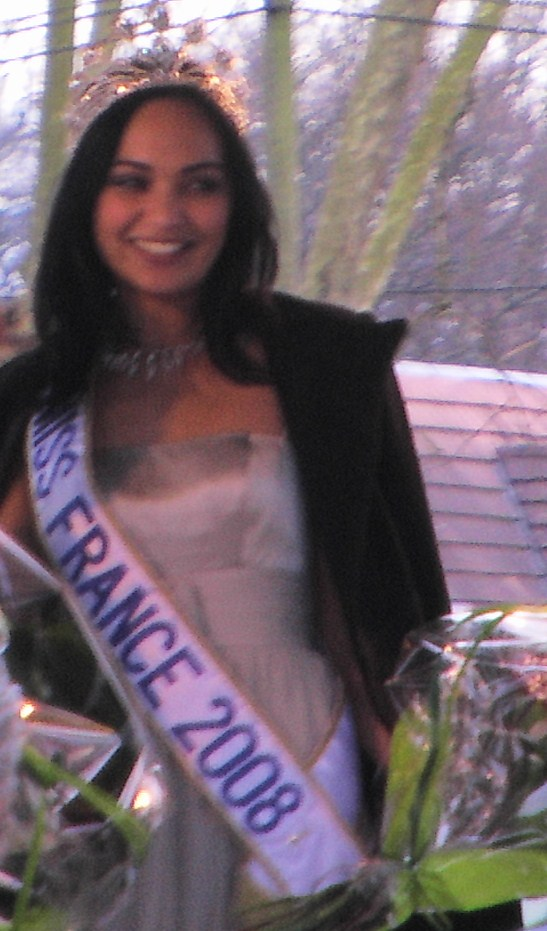
Miss Réunion 2007 and Miss France 2008
Valérie Bègue

== Titleholders ==
Year	Name	Age (Note: Ages at the time of Miss France)	Height	Hometown	Miss France placement	Notes
2026	Laetitia Roguet	20	1.72 m (5 ft 7 1/2 in)	Saint-Benoît	TBD	
2025	Priya Padavatan	20	1.70 m (5 ft 7 in)	Bras-Panon		Padavatan is the niece of politician Jean-Hugues Ratenon.
2024	Marine Futol	18	1.80 m (5 ft 11 in)	Saint-Leu		
2023	Mélanie Odules	20	1.78 m (5 ft 10 in)	Saint-Paul		
2022	Marion Marimoutou	18	1.72 m (5 ft 7 1/2 in)	Saint-André		
2021	Dana Virin	22	1.73 m (5 ft 8 in)	Sainte-Suzanne	Top 15 (6th Runner-Up)	
2020	Lyna Boyer	21	1.73 m (5 ft 8 in)	La Possession	Top 15 (5th Runner-Up)	
2019	Marie-Morgane Lebon	21	1.77 m (5 ft 9 1/2 in)	Saint-Joseph	Top 15	
2018	Morgane Soucramanien	18	1.74 m (5 ft 8 1/2 in)	Sainte-Marie	3rd Runner-Up	
2017	Audrey Chane Pao Kan	19	1.71 m (5 ft 7 1/2 in)	Saint-Joseph	4th Runner-Up	
2016	Ambre Nguyen	20	1.78 m (5 ft 10 in)	Saint-Denis	Top 12 (5th Runner-Up)	
2015	Azuima Issa	19	1.80 m (5 ft 11 in)	Saint-Denis	4th Runner-Up	
2014	Ingreed Mercredi	19	1.71 m (5 ft 7 1/2 in)	Saint-Paul		After making inflammatory comments about the Miss Réunion Committee, Mercredi was dethroned on 28 April 2015. Her reign was completed by Laterrière, her first runner-up.
2014	Anne-Gaëlle Laterrière	24		Saint-Paul	Did not compete	After making inflammatory comments about the Miss Réunion Committee, Mercredi was dethroned on 28 April 2015. Her reign was completed by Laterrière, her first runner-up.
2013	Vanille M'Doihoma	21	1.75 m (5 ft 9 in)	Le Tampon	Top 12	
2012	Stéphanie Robert	21	1.72 m (5 ft 7 1/2 in)	Saint-Paul		
2011	Marie Payet	19	1.78 m (5 ft 10 in)	Saint-Denis	2nd Runner-Up	Top 10 at Miss Universe 2012 (representing France)
2010	Florence Arginthe	18	1.72 m (5 ft 7 1/2 in)	Saint-Joseph		
2009	Kim Hoa Barutaut	18	1.82 m (5 ft 11 1/2 in)	Saint-Denis		
2008	Delphine Courteaud	22	1.72 m (5 ft 7 1/2 in)	La Possession	Top 12	
2007	Valérie Bègue	22	1.74 m (5 ft 8 1/2 in)	Saint-Leu	Miss France 2008	
2006	Raïssa Boyer	19	1.75 m (5 ft 9 in)	Sainte-Marie	2nd Runner-Up	
2005	Élodie Lebon	18	1.78 m (5 ft 10 in)	Les Avirons	3rd Runner-Up	
2004	Virginie Benoîte	22	1.76 m (5 ft 9 1/2 in)	Saint-Joseph	Top 12 (5th Runner-Up)	
2003	Gelsie Robert	19	1.72 m (5 ft 7 1/2 in)	Sainte-Marie		
2002	Stéphanie Tapé			Saint-Philippe		
2001	Raïssa Law Wan	21		Le Port	Top 12 (6th Runner-Up)	
2000	Natacha Delmas			Saint-André		
1999	Élodie Surray	19	1.76 m (5 ft 9 1/2 in)	La Possession	4th Runner-Up	
1998	Angélique Marcel	18	1.71 m (5 ft 7 1/2 in)			
1997	Sandrine Aipar	18	1.73 m (5 ft 8 in)		Did not compete	Aipar withdrew from Miss France 1998 after contracting an illness on the day of the competition.
1996	Fabienne Sabrimoutou					
1995	Béatrice Drula					
1994	Corine Lauret	18	1.74 m (5 ft 8 1/2 in)		2nd Runner-Up	Competed at Miss Universe 1995 (representing France)
1992	Laurence Lam-Wing-Hime	17				
1991	Brigitte Adam				Top 12	
1988	Gilda Payet	17	1.71 m (5 ft 7 1/2 in)			
1986	Joëlle Ramyead				1st Runner-Up	Competed at Miss International 1987 (representing France)
1985	Marie Florestan					Florestan, the first Cafrine winner of Miss Réunion, resigned six months after her crowning due to the racial discrimination she was subjected to. Her reign was completed by Geneviève Lebon, her first runner-up.
1985	Geneviève Lebon				Did not compete	Florestan, the first Cafrine winner of Miss Réunion, resigned six months after her crowning due to the racial discrimination she was subjected to. Her reign was completed by Geneviève Lebon, her first runner-up.
1984	Linda Hoareau					
1983	Marie-Paule Drula					
1982	Dominique Fontaine					
1981	Ginon Manthe					
1980	Patricia Abadie					Competed at Miss Universe 1981 (representing Réunion)
1979	Myrose Hoareau				3rd Runner-Up	
1978	Isabelle Jacquemart				2nd Runner-Up	Competed at Miss Universe 1979 (representing Réunion)
1977	Kelly Hoarau				2nd Runner-Up	Competed at Miss World 1978 (representing France)
1976	Évelyne Pongérard				2nd Runner-Up	Competed at Miss Universe 1978 (representing Réunion)
1975	Monique Uldaric	21	1.72 m (5 ft 7 1/2 in)		Miss France 1976	Competed at Miss Universe 1976 (representing France) Competed at Miss World 1976 (representing France)
1974	Bernadette Orboin				Top 12	
1958	Régine Fontaine					
1957	Monique Hoarau					
