= Miss Pays de la Loire =

- Type: Beauty pageant
- Headquarters: Pays de la Loire, France
- Members: Miss France
- Official language: French
- Regional director: Emilie Bachellereau
- Website: www.misspaysdelaloire.fr

Miss Pays de la Loire is a French beauty pageant which selects a representative for the Miss France national competition from the region of Pays de la Loire. Women representing the region under various different titles have competed at Miss France since 1960, although the Miss Pays de la Loire title was not used regularly until 2006. Until 2010, women from the department of Loire-Atlantique were eligible to compete in Miss Brittany rather than Miss Pays de la Loire, due to the department's historical ties to Brittany despite currently being located within the region of Pays de la Loire.

The current Miss Pays de la Loire is Maëlle Hamon, who was crowned Miss Pays de la Loire 2026 on 10 September 2026. Three women from Pays de la Loire have gone on to win Miss France.

- Jacqueline Gayraud, who was crowned Miss France 1964, competing as Miss Vendée, following the dethroning of the original winner
- Linda Hardy, who was crowned Miss France 1992
- Valérie Claisse, who was crowned Miss France 1994

== Results summary ==
- Miss France: Linda Hardy (1991); Valérie Claisse (1993)
- 1st Runner-Up: Jacqueline Gayraud (1963; Miss Vendée; later Miss France); Marie-Thérèse Vermond (1967; Miss Vendée); Mathilde Couly (2011)
- 2nd Runner-Up: Sandrine Hamidi (1996; Miss Anjou); Sabrina Champin (2004; Miss Maine); Laura Tanguy (2007); Élodie Martineau (2008)
- 4th Runner-Up: Séverine Deroualle (1995; Miss Anjou); Mélinda Paré (2012)
- 5th Runner-Up: Maud Perrochon (1998; Miss Anjou)
- 6th Runner-Up: Maud Garnier (1999); Yvana Cartaud (2019)
- Top 12/Top 15: Sonia Baffour (1991; Miss Anjou); Patricia Blain (1993; Miss Maine); Aude Rautureau (1998); Hélène Leroyer (2000; Miss Anjou); Christine Rambaud (2006); Julie Tagliavacca (2020); Line Carvalho (2021); Emma Guibert (2022); Clémence Ménard (2023)

== Gallery ==
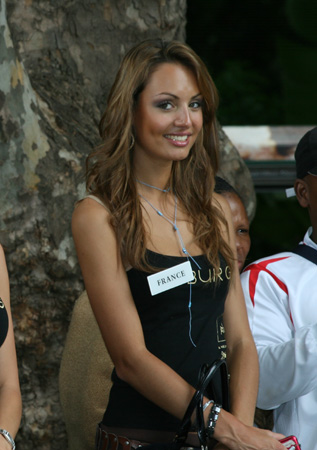
Miss Pays de la Loire 2007
Laura Tanguy

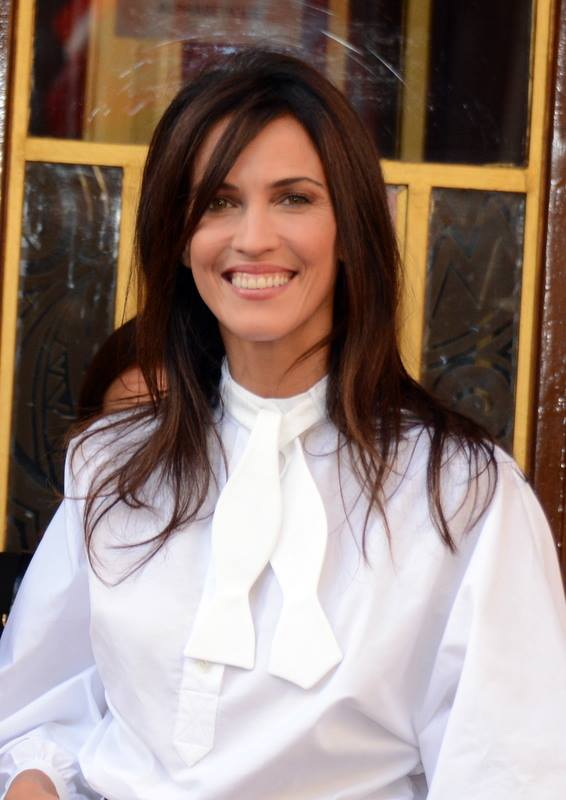
Miss Pays de la Loire 1991 and Miss France 1992
Linda Hardy

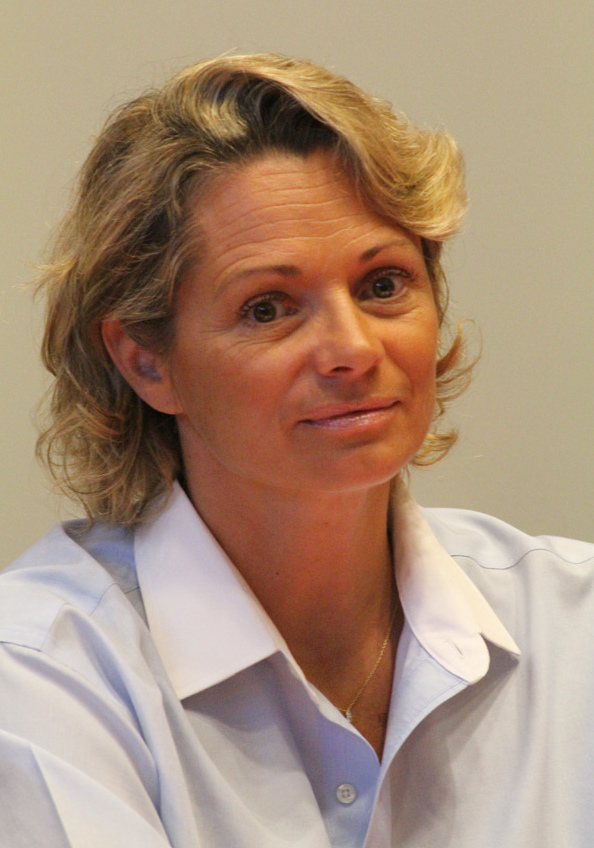
Miss Anjou 1981
Muriel Hermine

== Titleholders ==
Year	Name	Age (Note: Ages at the time of Miss France)	Height	Hometown	Miss France placement	Notes
2026	Maëlle Hamon	23	1.72 m (5 ft 7 1/2 in)	Les Sorinières	TBD	
2025	Lola Winter	19	1.70 m (5 ft 7 in)	Pornichet		
2024	Mélissa Atta Bessiom	26	1.81 m (5 ft 11 1/2 in)	Angers		
2023	Clémence Ménard	26	1.74 m (5 ft 8 1/2 in)	La Séguinière	Top 15	
2022	Emma Guibert	20	1.76 m (5 ft 9 1/2 in)	Poiroux	Top 15	
2021	Line Carvalho	20	1.78 m (5 ft 10 in)	Blain	Top 15	
2020	Julie Tagliavacca	24	1.73 m (5 ft 8 in)	Maulévrier	Top 15	
2019	Yvana Cartaud	18	1.74 m (5 ft 8 1/2 in)	Beaufou	Top 15 (6th Runner-Up)	
2018	Diane Le Roux	22	1.82 m (5 ft 11 1/2 in)	Orvault		
2017	Chloé Guémard	20	1.75 m (5 ft 9 in)	Olonne-sur-Mer		
2016	Carla Loones	21	1.77 m (5 ft 9 1/2 in)	Le Fresne-sur-Loire		
2015	Angélina Laurent	20	1.73 m (5 ft 8 in)	Ruaudin		
2014	Flavy Facon	21	1.76 m (5 ft 9 1/2 in)	Brain-sur-Allonnes		
2013	Marie Plessis	22	1.73 m (5 ft 8 in)	Rochefort-sur-Loire		
2012	Mélinda Paré	18	1.76 m (5 ft 9 1/2 in)	Le Lion-d'Angers	4th Runner-Up	
2011	Mathilde Couly	21	1.72 m (5 ft 7 1/2 in)	Héric	1st Runner-Up	
2010	Laetitia Legros	22	1.78 m (5 ft 10 in)	Saumur		
2009	Amélie Taugourdeau	23	1.70 m (5 ft 7 in)	Le Coudray-Macouard		
2008	Élodie Martineau	21	1.75 m (5 ft 9 in)	Auzay	2nd Runner-Up	
2007	Laura Tanguy	20	1.79 m (5 ft 10 1/2 in)	Écouflant	2nd Runner-Up	Competed at Miss World 2008 Competed at Miss Universe 2008
2006	Christine Rambaud	19	1.82 m (5 ft 11 1/2 in)	Saint-Barthélemy-d'Anjou	Top 12	
1999	Maud Garnier	23	1.83 m (6 ft 0 in)	Nantes	Top 12 (6th Runner-Up)	
1998	Aude Rautureau	18	1.84 m (6 ft 1/2 in)	Saint-Christophe-du-Bois	Top 12	
1997	Caroll Parfait	18	1.73 m (5 ft 8 in)	Saint-Julien-de-Concelles		
1996	Céline Bourban			Saint-Herblain		
1995	Magali Hautbois			Saint-Berthevin		
1994	Roselyne Ferre			Corsept		
1993	Valérie Claisse	21	1.76 m (5 ft 9 1/2 in)	Pornic	Miss France 1994	
1992	Karine Martineau					
1991	Linda Hardy	18	1.75 m (5 ft 9 in)	Saint-Herblain	Miss France 1992	Competed at Miss Universe 1992 Competed at Miss World 1992
1990	Nathalie Fonteneau			Mortagne-sur-Sèvre		
1989	Alexandra Warin					
1988	Anne Février	18	1.67 m (5 ft 5 1/2 in)	Carquefou		
1987	Stéphanie Dubois					
1986	Véronique Ploumion					
1985	Catherine Challier					

=== Miss Anjou ===
From the 1970s until the 2000s, the department of Maine-et-Loire competed separately under the title Miss Anjou. In 1967, the department competed as Miss Val de Loire.

Year	Name	Age	Height	Hometown	Miss France placement	Notes
2005	Vidya Juganaikloo	20	1.75 m (5 ft 9 in)	Chanzeaux		
2004	Émilie Pinheiro	20	1.78 m (5 ft 10 in)	Cholet		
2003	Audrey Gasnier			Varennes-sur-Loire		
2002	Cécile Bourdeau			Angers		
2001	Estelle Davy			Marigné		
2000	Hélène Leroyer			Angers	Top 12	
1999	Laureen Bidi	19	1.80 m (5 ft 11 in)	Cholet		
1998	Maud Perrochon	22	1.81 m (5 ft 11 1/2 in)	Saint-Christophe-du-Bois	Top 12 (5th Runner-Up)	
1997	Sonia Leray	19	1.76 m (5 ft 9 1/2 in)	Sainte-Gemmes-d'Andigné		
1996	Sandrine Hamidi			Chalonnes-sur-Loire	2nd Runner-Up	
1995	Séverine Deroualle	20	1.82 m (5 ft 11 1/2 in)	Avrillé	4th Runner-Up	Competed at Miss World 1996
1994	Estelle Chiron			Pouancé		
1993	Béatrice Glebeau			Le Louroux-Béconnais		
1992	Sarah Vetele					
1991	Sonia Baffour			Segré	Top 12	
1990	Katia Lethieleux			Brézé		
1989	Valérie Broucas					
1988	Véronique Guineheux	19	1.79 m (5 ft 10 1/2 in)			
1987	Laurence Janitor			Bel-Air-de-Combrée		
1986	Nathalie Expert			Saumur		
1981	Muriel Hermine				Did not compete	Hermine did not compete in Miss France in order to train for the 1982 World Aquatics Championships.
1979	Dominique Guilleau					
1978	Corinne Gaborieau					
1977	Martine Rabier					
1976	Édith Marsollier					
1967	Michèle Cailleux					

=== Miss Brière ===
In 1977 and 1978, the department of Loire-Atlantique competed separately under the title Miss Brière.

Year	Name	Age	Height	Hometown	Miss France placement	Notes
1978	Patricia Arel					
1977	Françoise Hellec					

=== Miss Maine ===
In the 1990s and 2000s, the departments of Mayenne and Sarthe competed separately under the title Miss Maine.

Year	Name	Age	Height	Hometown	Miss France placement	Notes
2005	Amandine Tardif	21	1.78 m (5 ft 10 in)	Beaumont-Pied-de-Bœuf		
2004	Sabrina Champin	21	1.73 m (5 ft 8 in)	Le Mans	2nd Runner-Up	
2003	Melgie Vadier			Mulsanne		
2002	Aurélie Paillard			Le Mans		
2001	Tatiana Morin			Notre-Dame-du-Pé		
2000	Karine Tessier			La Flèche		
1996	Angélique Monnier			Le Mans		
1995	Stéphanie Besnardeau			Malicorne		
1993	Patricia Blain			Saint-Michel-de-la-Roë	Top 12	

=== Miss Mayenne ===
In the 1970s and 1980s, the department of Mayenne crowned its own representative for Miss France.

Year	Name	Age	Height	Hometown	Miss France placement	Notes
1986	Cathy Fleury			Ernée		
1985	Delphine Reichert			Saint-Baudelle		
1979	Claudie Clément					
1970	Catherine Cornier					

=== Miss La Baule ===
In 1962, the department of Loire-Atlantique competed separately under the title Miss La Baule.

Year	Name	Age	Height	Hometown	Miss France placement	Notes
1962	Nicole Chauveau					

=== Miss Sarthe ===
In the 1970s and 1980s, the department of Sarthe crowned its own representative for Miss France.

Year	Name	Age	Height	Hometown	Miss France placement	Notes
1988	Sarah Furri	19	1.67 m (5 ft 5 1/2 in)	La Flèche		
1985	Caroline Fattal					
1979	Marie-Thérèse Gaulupeau					
1978	Sylvie Blin					
1977	Brigitte Jarrier					
1976	Brigitte Cuinier					
1970	Mylène Renoult					

=== Miss Vendée ===
In 1964 and 1967, the department of Vendée crowned its own representative for Miss France.

Year	Name	Age	Height	Hometown	Miss France placement	Notes
1967	Marie-Thérèse Vermond				1st Runner-Up	
1963	Jacqueline Gayraud				1st Runner-Up (later Miss France 1965)	Gayraud was originally the first runner-up, but took over as Miss France 1964 after the original winner was dethroned for refusing to travel throughout France as part of her official duties.
