= Miss Lorraine =

French Regional Beauty pageant

- Type: Beauty pageant
- Headquarters: Lorraine, France
- Members: Miss France
- Official language: French
- Regional director: Stéphanie Didon

Miss Lorraine is a French beauty pageant which selects a representative for the Miss France national competition from the region of Lorraine. The first Miss Lorraine was crowned in 1962, although the title was not used regularly until 1985.

The current Miss Lorraine is Léane Froment, who was crowned Miss Lorraine 2026 on 12 September 2026. Three women from Lorraine have been crowned Miss France:

- Isabelle Krumacker, who was crowned Miss France 1973
- Sophie Perin, who was crowned Miss France 1975
- Sophie Thalmann, who was crowned Miss France 1998

== Results summary ==
- Miss France: Isabelle Krumacker (1972); Sophie Perin (1974); Sophie Thalmann (1997)
- 1st Runner-Up: Cynthia Tévéré (2004); Camille Chéyère (2008)
- 2nd Runner-Up: Norma Klein (1969)
- 4th Runner-Up: Flore Skoracki (1986); Justine Kamara (2016)
- 6th Runner-Up: Marylène Bergmann (1975); Sarah Aoutar (2022)
- Top 12 / Top 15: Florence Rose (1987); Betty Pierre (1991); Sandra Thiringer (2001); Emma Virtz (2018); Marine Sauvage (2021); Assia Roosz-Tomenti (2024)

== Gallery ==
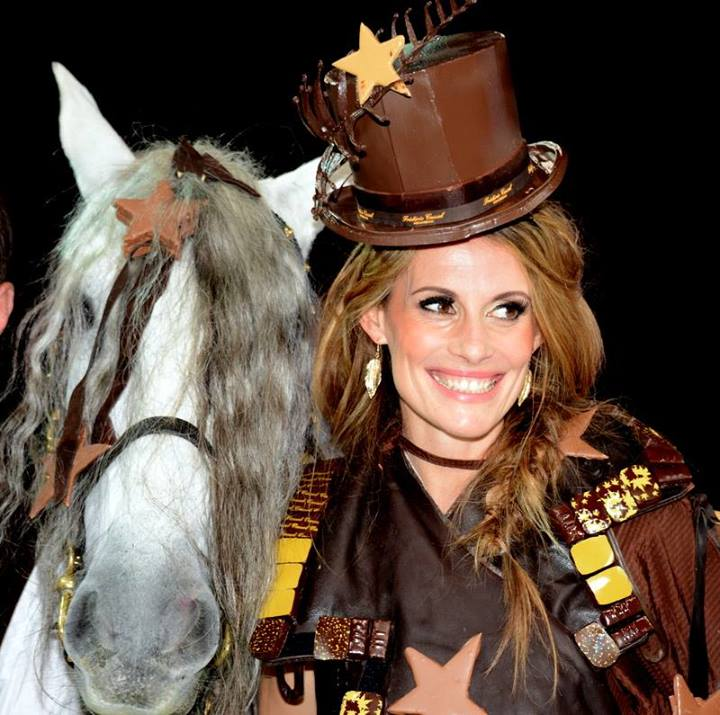
Miss Lorraine 1997 and Miss France 1998
Sophie Thalmann

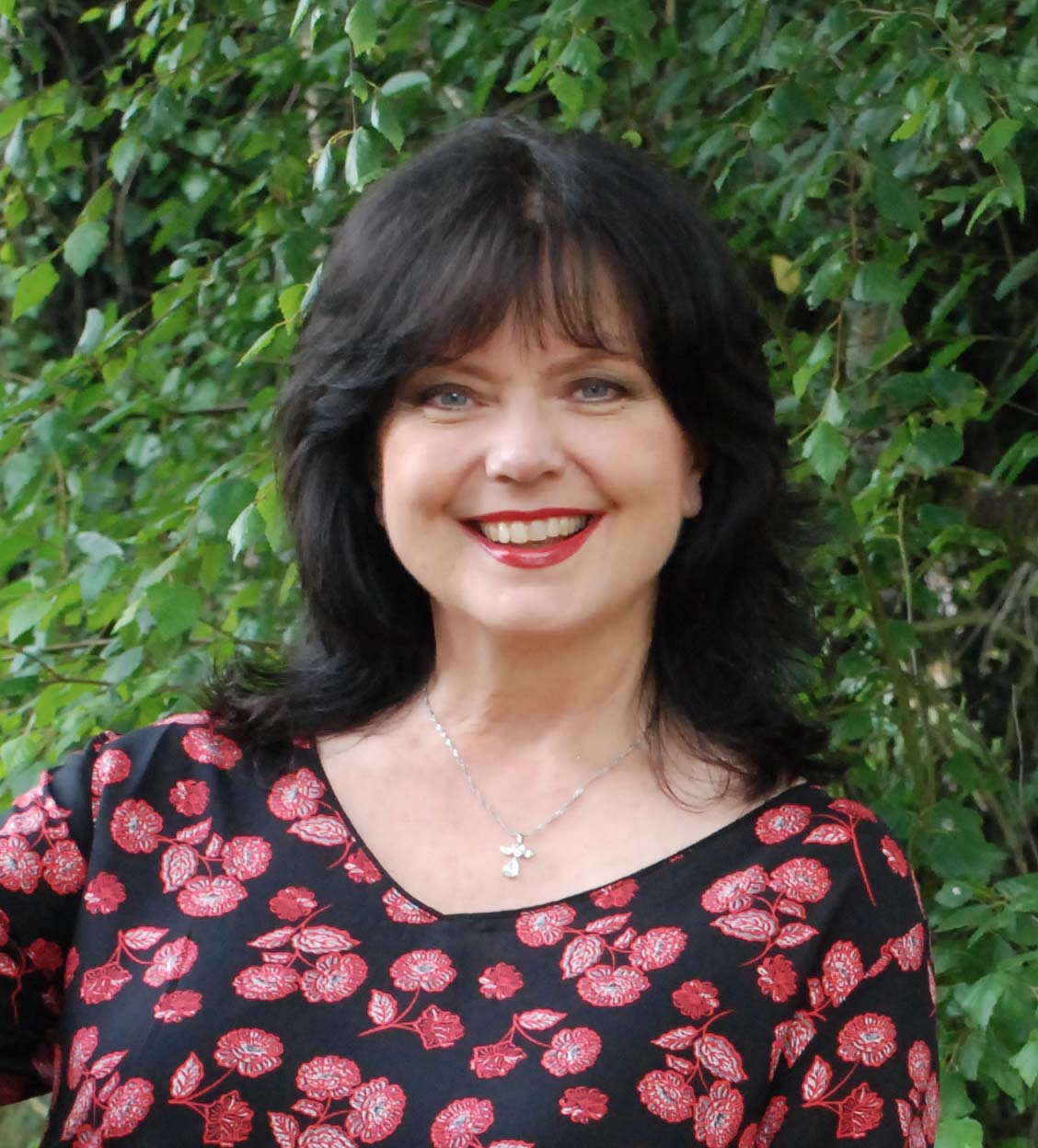
Miss Lorraine 1975
Marylène Bergmann

== Titleholders ==
Year	Name	Age (Note: Ages at the time of Miss France)	Height	Hometown	Miss France placement	Notes
2026	Léane Froment	21	1.72 m (5 ft 7 1/2 in)	Gondreville	TBD	
2025	Camille L'Étang	23	1.72 m (5 ft 7 1/2 in)	Liverdun		
2024	Assia Roosz-Tomenti	25	1.86 m (6 ft 1 in)	Villerupt	Top 15	
2023	Angéline Aron-Clauss	26	1.70 m (5 ft 7 in)	Hilbesheim		
2022	Sarah Aoutar	26	1.73 m (5 ft 8 in)	Thionville	Top 15 (6th Runner-up)	
2021	Marine Sauvage	23	1.75 m (5 ft 9 in)	Ars-sur-Moselle	Top 15	
2020	Diane Febvay	19	1.78 m (5 ft 10 in)	Piblange		
2019	Ilona Robelin	18	1.80 m (5 ft 11 in)	Montenoy		
2018	Emma Virtz	21	1.72 m (5 ft 7 1/2 in)	Villers-lès-Nancy	Top 12	
2017	Cloé Cirelli	21	1.72 m (5 ft 7 1/2 in)	Amanvillers		
2016	Justine Kamara	20	1.72 m (5 ft 7 1/2 in)	Dombasle-sur-Meurthe	4th Runner-up	Competing at Miss Universe 2026 (representing Guinea)
2015	Jessica Molle	18	1.70 m (5 ft 7 in)	Corny-sur-Moselle		
2014	Charlène Lallemand	18	1.74 m (5 ft 8 1/2 in)	Chantraine		
2013	Charline Keck	19	1.79 m (5 ft 10 1/2 in)	Vigy		
2012	Divanna Pljevalcic	20	1.72 m (5 ft 7 1/2 in)	Saint-Avold		
2011	Maud Pisa	21	1.77 m (5 ft 9 1/2 in)	Ham-sous-Varsberg		
2010	Maëva Pax	19	1.70 m (5 ft 7 in)	Sarreinsming		
2009	Marina Garau	22	1.74 m (5 ft 8 1/2 in)	Bouzonville		
2008	Camille Chéyère	21	1.79 m (5 ft 10 1/2 in)	Thionville	1st Runner-up	
2007	Aurélie Charlier	21	1.74 m (5 ft 8 1/2 in)	Homécourt		
2006	Anaïs Piquée	19	1.80 m (5 ft 11 in)	Épinal		
2005	Béatrice Thiery	19	1.76 m (5 ft 9 1/2 in)	Jarny		
2004	Cynthia Tévéré	20	1.83 m (6 ft 0 in)		1st Runner-up	Top 12 at Miss International 2005
2003	Marielle Masson					
2002	Laetitia Ambiehl			Gandrange		
2001	Sandra Thiringer				Top 12	
2000	Aurélie Peter			Saint-Étienne-lès-Remiremont		
1999	Audrey Christophe	19	1.72 m (5 ft 7 1/2 in)			
1998	Karine Meier	18	1.84 m (6 ft 1/2 in)			Meier was dethroned after participating in Miss France, and was replaced by Henry, her first runner-up.
1998	Virginie Henry				Did not compete	Meier was dethroned after participating in Miss France, and was replaced by Henry, her first runner-up.
1997	Sophie Thalmann	21	1.81 m (5 ft 11 1/2 in)	Bar-le-Duc	Miss France 1998	Competed at Miss Universe 1998
1996	Manuela Pereira	21	1.76 m (5 ft 9 1/2 in)	Jezainville		
1995	Estelle Kuntz					
1994	Sandrine Zannoni					
1993	Karine Gautier					
1992	Cécile Bolis					
1991	Betty Pierre				Top 12	
1990	Véronique Mangenot					
1989	Gabrielle Hauss					
1988	Marylin Kasel					
1987	Florence Rose				Top 12	
1986	Carine Humblot				4th Runner-up	
1985	Aline Zuzek					
1981	Valérie Wucher					
1979	Valérie Kohler					
1978	Myriam Moingeon					
1977	Dominique Trotot					
1976	Jacqueline Bayer					
1975	Marylène Bergmann				6th Runner-up	
1974	Sophie Perin	17		Talange	Miss France 1975	Miss International 1976
1972	Isabelle Krumacker	16		Troisfontaines	Miss France 1973	Top 15 at Miss International 1975 Competed Miss Universe 1973 Competed at Miss World 1973
1970	Murielle Jacquot					
1969	Norma Klein				2nd Runner-up	
1962	Liliane Collinet					
