= Miss Limousin =

- Type: Beauty pageant
- Headquarters: Limousin, France
- Members: Miss France
- Official language: French
- Regional director: Nadine Preece
- Website: www.miss-limousin.fr

Miss Limousin is a French beauty pageant which selects a representative for the Miss France national competition from the region of Limousin. Women representing the region under various different titles have competed at Miss France since 1970, although the Miss Limousin title was not used regularly until 1986.

The current Miss Limousin is Élise Escuriol, who was crowned Miss Limousin 2026 on 6 September 2026. No Miss Limousin titleholders have gone on to win Miss France.

== Results summary ==
- 1st Runner-Up: Sophie Vouzelaud (2006)
- 2nd Runner-Up: Cécilia Perrier (1992)
- 3rd Runner-Up: Angélique Dusservaix (1975); Michèle Viravaud (1977)
- 4th Runner-Up: Aude Destour (2018)
- Top 12/Top 15: Florence Bailet (1988); Priscilla Perrault (2000); Chloé Certoux (2008); Justine Posé (2009); Anaïs Berthomier (2017); Léa Graniou (2020); Aloïce Sejotte (2025)

== Gallery ==
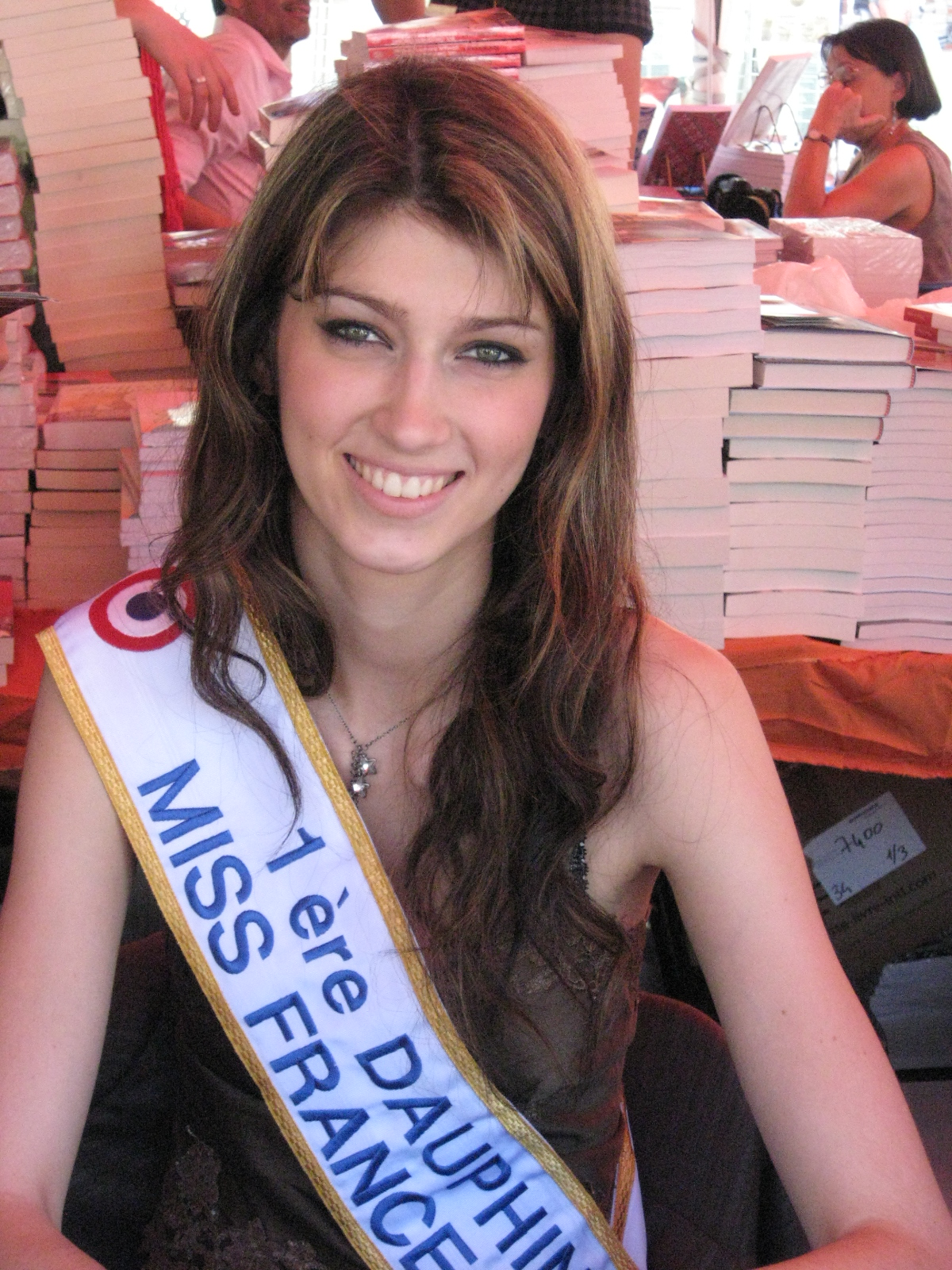
Miss Limousin 2006
Sophie Vouzelaud

== Titleholders ==
From 1999 until 2005, the region competed under the name Miss Marche-Limousin. Prior to 1999 and after 2005, the region has competed as Miss Limousin.

Year	Name	Age (Note: Ages at the time of Miss France)	Height	Hometown	Miss France placement	Notes
2026	Élise Escuriol	22	1.74 m (5 ft 8 1/2 in)	Brive-la-Gaillarde	TBD	
2025	Aloïce Sejotte	24	1.74 m (5 ft 8 1/2 in)	Chamboret	Top 12	
2024	Emma Grégoire	23	1.78 m (5 ft 10 in)	Bort-les-Orgues		
2023	Agathe Toullieu	21	1.77 m (5 ft 9 1/2 in)	Cosnac		
2022	Salomé Maud	23	1.74 m (5 ft 8 1/2 in)	Limoges		
2021	Julie Bève	23	1.71 m (5 ft 7 1/2 in)	Meilhards		
2020	Léa Graniou	20	1.72 m (5 ft 7 1/2 in)	Limoges	Top 15	
2019	Alison Salapic	22	1.72 m (5 ft 7 1/2 in)	Saint-Vaury		
2018	Aude Destour	24	1.76 m (5 ft 9 1/2 in)	Limoges	4th Runner-Up	
2017	Anaïs Berthomier	19	1.71 m (5 ft 7 1/2 in)	Couzeix	Top 12	
2016	Romane Komar	18	1.75 m (5 ft 9 in)	Feytiat		
2015	Emma Bourroux	19	1.80 m (5 ft 11 in)	Saint-Germain-les-Vergnes		
2014	Léa Froidefond	19	1.72 m (5 ft 7 1/2 in)	Allassac		
2013	Caroline Dubreuil	21	1.77 m (5 ft 9 1/2 in)	Limoges		
2012	Sandra Longeaud	23	1.72 m (5 ft 7 1/2 in)	Saint-Victor-en-Marche		
2011	Cindy Letoux	18	1.75 m (5 ft 9 in)	Limoges		
2010	Nellie Valentin	24	1.72 m (5 ft 7 1/2 in)	Brive-la-Gaillarde		
2009	Justine Posé	18	1.77 m (5 ft 9 1/2 in)	Chameyrat	Top 12	
2008	Chloé Certoux	18	1.78 m (5 ft 10 in)	Limoges	Top 12	
2007	Charlotte Brissaud	22	1.78 m (5 ft 10 in)			
2006	Sophie Vouzelaud	19	1.79 m (5 ft 10 1/2 in)	Saint-Junien	1st Runner-Up	Competed at Miss International 2007
2005	Elodie Dargier	20	1.77 m (5 ft 9 1/2 in)	Saint-Vaury		
2004	Wéronika Lazewski	18	1.74 m (5 ft 8 1/2 in)			
2003	Emilie Girodias					
2002	Alexandra Dumitru			Le Palais-sur-Vienne		
2001	Stéphanie Kaczor					
2000	Priscilla Perrault			Limoges	Top 12	
1999	Lucie Magnonneau	20	1.75 m (5 ft 9 in)			
1997	Cécile Chaminade					
1996	Stéphanie Leroy					
1995	Sophie Picaud					
1994	Eurydice Coussot					
1993	Sandra Dunoyer					
1992	Cécilia Perrier				2nd Runner-Up	
1991	Myriam Magron					
1990	Stéphanie Senelas					
1989	Melany Swell					
1988	Florence Bailet				Top 12	
1987	Sylvie Loirat					
1986	Valérie Laurent					
1979	Catherine Laferte					Laferte was crowned Miss Corrèze in 1978, and Miss Limousin in 1979.
1978	Pascale Fayraud					Fayraud was crowned Miss Haute-Vienne in 1977, and Miss Limousin in 1978.
1977	Michèle Viravaud				3rd Runner-Up	
1976	Marie-Josée Santana					
1975	Angélique Dusservaix				3rd Runner-Up	Dusservaix was crowned Miss Limousin two years in a row, in 1974 and 1975, and was crowned Miss Haute-Vienne in 1976.
1974	Angélique Dusservaix					Dusservaix was crowned Miss Limousin two years in a row, in 1974 and 1975, and was crowned Miss Haute-Vienne in 1976.
1970	Francoise Rantian Juillat					

=== Miss Corrèze ===
In 1977 and 1978, the department of Corrèze crowned its own representative for Miss France.

Year	Name	Age	Height	Hometown	Miss France placement	Notes
1978	Catherine Laferte					Laferte was crowned Miss Corrèze in 1978, and Miss Limousin in 1979.
1977	Sylvie Chiquet					

=== Miss Creuse ===
In 1976 and 1977, the department of Creuse crowned its own representative for Miss France.

Year	Name	Age	Height	Hometown	Miss France placement	Notes
1977	Isabelle Panissier					
1976	Dominique Gaumet					

=== Miss Haute-Vienne ===
In 1976 and 1977, the department of Haute-Vienne crowned its own representative for Miss France.

Year	Name	Age	Height	Hometown	Miss France placement	Notes
1977	Pascale Fayraud					Fayraud was crowned Miss Haute-Vienne in 1977, and Miss Limousin in 1978.
1976	Angélique Dusservaix					Dusservaix was crowned Miss Limousin two years in a row, in 1974 and 1975, and was crowned Miss Haute-Vienne in 1976.
