= Miss Brittany =

Beauty contest

- Type: Beauty pageant
- Headquarters: Brittany, France
- Members: Miss France
- Official language: French
- Regional director: Cathy Vallée
- Website: www.missbretagne.fr

Miss Brittany (French: Miss Bretagne; Breton: Itron Breizh) is a French beauty pageant which selects a representative for the Miss France national competition from the region of Brittany. Women representing the region under various different titles have competed at Miss France since 1920, although the Miss Brittany title was not used regularly until 1981. Until 2010, women from the department of Loire-Atlantique were eligible to compete in Miss Brittany, due to the department's historical ties to the region, despite currently being located within the region of Pays de la Loire.

The current Miss Brittany is Margot Ferré-Bernard, who was crowned Miss Brittany 2026 on 25 September 2026. Six women from Brittany have gone on to win Miss France.

- Raymonde Allain, who was crowned Miss France 1928, competing as Miss Côte d'Émeraude
- Jacqueline Janet, who was crowned Miss France 1937, competing as Miss Côte d'Émeraude
- Brigitte Barazer de Lannurien, who was crowned Miss France 1960, competing as Miss Côte d'Émeraude
- Michèle Wargnier, who was crowned Miss France 1961
- Monique Lemaire, who was crowned Miss France 1962, competing as Miss Côte d'Émeraude
- Laury Thilleman, who was crowned Miss France 2011

== Results summary ==
- Miss France: Raymonde Allain (1927; Miss Côte d'Émeraude); Jacqueline Janet (1936; Miss Côte d'Émeraude); Brigitte Barazer de Lannurien (1959; Miss Côte d'Émeraude); Michèle Wargnier (1960); Monique Lemaire (1961; Miss Côte d'Émeraude); Laury Thilleman (2010)
- 1st Runner-Up: Denise Le Brase (1920; Miss Côte d'Émeraude); Anita Treyens (1955); Monique Boulinguez (1957; Miss Côte d'Émeraude); Rolande Cozien (1968); Valérie Guenveur (1982); Christelle Mayet (1983)
- 2nd Runner-Up: Anne-Marie Poggi (1990); Mélanie Craignou (2009)
- 3rd Runner-Up: Marie-Laure Uzel (1978; Graziella Pequin (1987)
- 4th Runner-Up: Bianca Taillard (2008)
- 5th Runner-Up: Annie Cadiou (1970); Denise Kerfast (1971)
- 6th Runner-Up: Maurane Bouazza (2016)
- Top 12/Top 15: Delphine André (1994); Florence Guillou (1999); Nathalie Economides (2003); Audrey Bonecker (2011); Estelle Sabathier (2012); Léa Bizeul (2015)

== Gallery ==
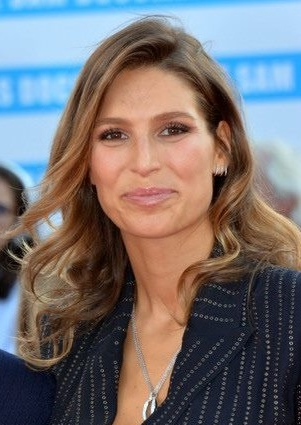
Miss Brittany 2010 and Miss France 2011
Laury Thilleman

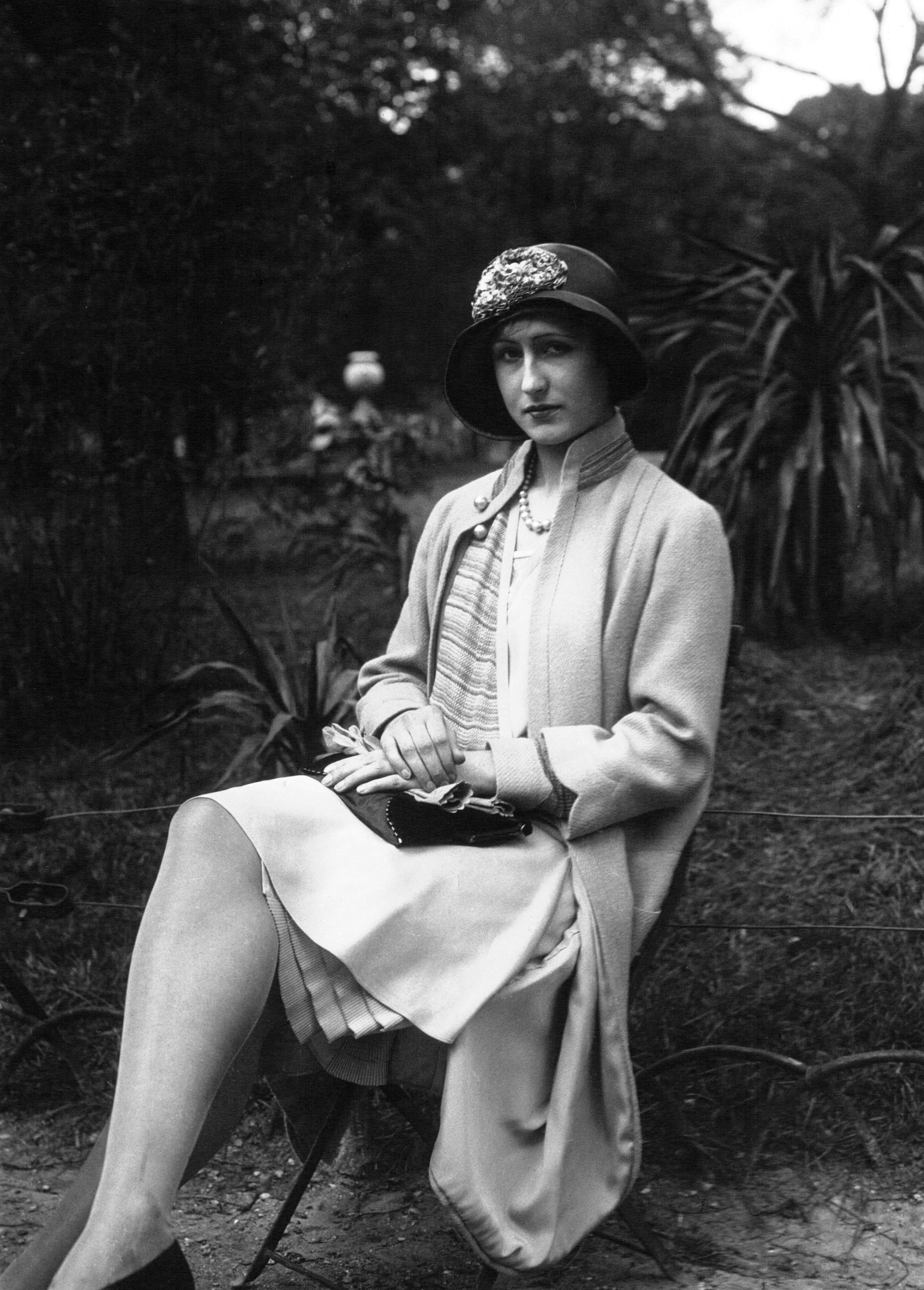
Miss Côte d'Émeraude 1927 and Miss France 1928
Raymonde Allain

== Titleholders ==
Year	Name	Age (Note: Ages at the time of the pageant)	Height	Hometown	Miss France placement	Notes
2026	Margot Ferré-Bernard	20	1.71 m (5 ft 7 1/2 in)	Guipavas	TBD	
2025	Ninon Crolas	18	1.71 m (5 ft 7 1/2 in)	Ploërmel		
2024	Marie Castel	20	1.78 m (5 ft 10 in)	Pleyber-Christ		
2023	Noémie Le Bras	21	1.75 m (5 ft 9 in)	Le Cloître-Pleyben		
2022	Enora Moal	21	1.71 m (5 ft 7 1/2 in)	Guipavas		
2021	Sarah Conan	22	1.74 m (5 ft 8 1/2 in)	Lézardrieux		
2020	Julie Foricher	23	1.77 m (5 ft 9 1/2 in)	Le Relecq-Kerhuon		
2019	Romane Edern	24	1.75 m (5 ft 9 in)	Cléder		
2018	Emilie Bachellereau	22	1.81 m (5 ft 11 1/2 in)	Larmor-Plage		
2017	Caroline Lemée	24	1.77 m (5 ft 9 1/2 in)	Rennes		
2016	Maurane Bouazza	20	1.73 m (5 ft 8 in)	Plumelin	Top 12 (6th Runner-Up)	
2015	Eugénie Journée	23	1.70 m (5 ft 7 in)	Rennes	Did not compete	Journée was dethroned three days after winning the title, after it emerged that she had previously posed topless for a photoshoot. She was replaced by Bizeul, her first runner-up.
2015	Léa Bizeul	18	1.73 m (5 ft 8 in)	Saint-Malo	Top 12	Journée was dethroned three days after winning the title, after it emerged that she had previously posed topless for a photoshoot. She was replaced by Bizeul, her first runner-up.
2014	Maïlys Bonnet	20	1.77 m (5 ft 9 1/2 in)	Vannes		
2013	Marie Chartier	19	1.71 m (5 ft 7 1/2 in)	Étables-sur-Mer		
2012	Estelle Sabathier	21	1.74 m (5 ft 8 1/2 in)	Brest	Top 12	
2011	Audrey Bonecker	23	1.72 m (5 ft 7 1/2 in)	Muzillac	Top 12	Bonecker is the daughter of Isabelle Carayol, Miss Brittany 1974.
2010	Laury Thilleman	19	1.79 m (5 ft 10 1/2 in)	Brest	Miss France 2011	Top 10 at Miss Universe 2011
2009	Mélanie Craignou	19	1.77 m (5 ft 9 1/2 in)	Louannec	2nd Runner-Up	
2008	Bianca Taillard	23	1.76 m (5 ft 9 1/2 in)	Machecoul	4th Runner-Up	
2007	Églantine Morin	21	1.78 m (5 ft 10 in)	Savenay		
2006	Charline Leray	19	1.75 m (5 ft 9 in)	Lusanger		
2005	Cindy Trichereau Duchesne	24	1.83 m (6 ft 0 in)	Nantes		
2004	Amélie Turmel	19	1.72 m (5 ft 7 1/2 in)	Lillemer		
2003	Nathalie Economides	21	1.78 m (5 ft 10 in)	Guidel	Top 12	
2002	Anne-Sophie Pageau			Vigneux-de-Bretagne		
2001	Céline Autricque	20	1.81 m (5 ft 11 1/2 in)	Nantes		
2000	Mélanie Guyomard	19	1.78 m (5 ft 10 in)	Brest		
1999	Florence Guillou	19	1.76 m (5 ft 9 1/2 in)	Saint-Brieuc	Top 12	
1998	Virginie Radier	19	1.78 m (5 ft 10 in)	Ploulec'h		
1997	Nathalie Busson			Châtelaudren		
1996	Séverine André			Trégastel		Sister of Miss Brittany 1994 Delphine André.
1995	Violaine Turpin			Trévé		
1994	Delphine André	19	1.79 m (5 ft 10 1/2 in)	Trégastel	Top 12	Sister of Miss Brittany 1996 Séverine André.
1993	Alexia Dereux-Marchand					
1992	Stéphanie Ducos					
1991	Patricia Mouazec	18	1.79 m (5 ft 10 1/2 in)			
1990	Anne-Marie Poggi	18	1.70 m (5 ft 7 in)	Saint-Briac-sur-Mer	2nd Runner-Up	
1989	Stéphanie Lemarchand					
1988	Lydie Guilment	21	1.67 m (5 ft 5 1/2 in)			
1987	Graziella Pequin			Nantes	3rd Runner-Up	
1986	Catherine Hérault					
1985	Valérie Le Vaillant					
1984	Manuella Pequin			Nantes		
1983	Christelle Mayet				1st Runner-Up	
1982	Valérie Guenveur	18	1.75 m (5 ft 9 in)	Saint-Brieuc	1st Runner-Up	Competed at Miss International 1983
1981	Véronique Morice					
1979	Véronique Guin					
1978	Marie-Laure Uzel			Lorient	3rd Runner-Up	
1976	Christine Robin					
1974	Isabelle Carayol					Carayol is the mother of Audrey Bonecker, Miss Bretagne 2011.
1972	Louise Le Calvez	22	1.76 m (5 ft 9 1/2 in)			
1971	Denise Kerfast				5th Runner-Up	
1970	Annie Cadiou				5th Runner-Up	
1969	Catherine Ledu					
1968	Rolande Cozien			Brest	1st Runner-Up	
1965	Madeleine Calvez	20	1.75 m (5 ft 9 in)			
1964	Chantal Le Coz					
1960	Michèle Wargnier	24	1.78 m (5 ft 10 in)		Miss France 1961	2nd Runner-Up at Miss World 1961
1955	Anita Treyens				1st Runner-Up	Top 15 at Miss Universe 1956
1952	Paulette Le Bourkin					

=== Miss Argoat ===
From 1977 to 1979, the inland area of Brittany, known as Argoat, competed separately.

Year	Name	Age	Height	Hometown	Miss France placement	Notes
1979	Anne Le Maux					
1978	Anne-Yvonne Le Roux					
1977	Yasmine Arnal					

=== Miss Côte d'Émeraude ===
Prior to the 1960s, the departments of Côtes d'Armor and Ille-et-Vilaine competed separately under the title Miss Côte d'Émeraude.

Year	Name	Age	Height	Hometown	Miss France placement	Notes
1967	Martine Henry					
1962	Françoise Minec					
1961	Monique Lemaire	20	1.78 m (5 ft 10 in)	Côtes d'Armor	Miss France 1962	
1959	Brigitte Barazer de Lannurien	22	1.76 m (5 ft 9 1/2 in)		Miss France 1960	
1957	Monique Boulinguez				1st Runner-Up	Competed at Miss Universe 1958
1936	Jacqueline Janet	16	1.74 m (5 ft 8 1/2 in)		Miss France 1937	
1927	Raymonde Allain	16	1.72 m (5 ft 7 1/2 in)		Miss France 1928	
1920	Denise Le Brase	17	1.70 m (5 ft 7 in)		1st Runner-Up	

=== Miss Côte de Granit ===
In the 1970s, the department of Côtes d'Armor competed separately under the title Miss Côte de Granit.

Year	Name	Age	Height	Hometown	Miss France placement	Notes
1979	Catherine Parera					
1977	Corinne Le Goff					
1976	Catherine Matonnier					

=== Miss Finistère ===
In 1967, the department of Finistère crowned its own representative for Miss France.

Year	Name	Age	Height	Hometown	Miss France placement	Notes
1967	Marie Martine Legrand					

=== Miss Morbihan ===
In 1964, the department of Morbihan crowned its own representative for Miss France. In 1979, the department competed under the title Miss Lorient.

Year	Name	Age	Height	Hometown	Miss France placement	Notes
1979	Claudine Gosselin					
1964	Annie Delabre					
