= Miss France 2012 =

82th edition of Miss France

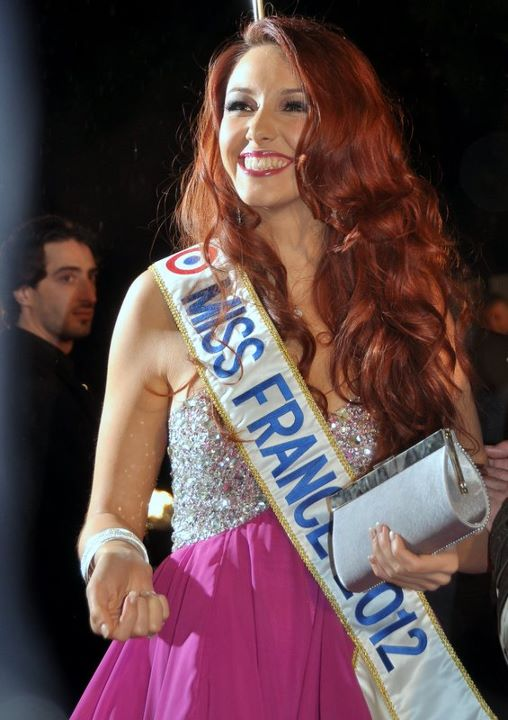
- Date: 3 December 2011
- Presenters: Jean-Pierre Foucault, Sylvie Tellier
- Venue: Parc des Expositions de Penfeld, Brest, France
- Broadcaster: TF1
- Entrants: 33
- Placements: 12
- Winner: Delphine Wespiser; Alsace
- Congeniality: Charlene Civault; Martinique
- Photogenic: Laure Wojnecki; Centre

Miss France 2012 was the 82nd Miss France pageant, held in Brest on 3 December 2011. Miss France 2012, Laury Thilleman of Brittany crowned her successor Delphine Wespiser of Alsace at the end of the event.

It was the first time that the pageant took place in Brest and in the Brittany region.

It was presented by the national director Sylvie Tellier and Jean-Pierre Foucault for the 17th consecutive year. The event was broadcast live by TF1.

The winner was Miss Alsace, Delphine Wespiser, who gave to her region its sixth Miss France title.

== Results ==
=== Placements ===
Placement	Contestant
Miss France 2012	Alsace – Delphine Wespiser
1st Runner-Up	Pays de la Loire – Mathilde Couly
2nd Runner-Up	Réunion – Marie Payet
3rd Runner-Up	Provence – Solène Froment
4th Runner-Up	Côte d'Azur – Charlotte Murray
Top 12	Martinique – Charlène Civault (5th Runner-Up); Languedoc – Alison Cossenet (6th Runner-Up); Brittany – Audrey Bönecker; Burgundy – Elodie Paillardin; French Guiana – Anaële Veilleur; Midi-Pyrénées – Laura Madelain; Roussillon – Julie Vialo

== Preparation ==
The 33 contestants, Laury Thilleman and the national director Sylvie Tellier had travelled to Cancun, in Mexico from November, 3 to November, 12. The rehearsals took place in Brest.

== Contestants ==
Region	Name	Age	Height	Hometown	Elected	Placement
Alsace	Delphine Wespiser	19	175 cm (5 ft 9 in)	Magstatt-le-Bas	October, 2 in Kingersheim	Miss France 2012
Aquitaine	Claire Zengerlin	20	174 cm (5 ft 8 1/2 in)	Douzillac	October, 8 in Aiguillon	
Auvergne	Célia Goninet	19	175 cm (5 ft 9 in)	Clermont-Ferrand	October, 16 in Cébazat	
Brittany	Audrey Bönecker	23	172 cm (5 ft 7 1/2 in)	Muzillac	October, 26 in Pontivy	Top 12
Burgundy	Elodie Paillardin	19	177 cm (5 ft 9 1/2 in)	Gevrey-Chambertin	September, 30 in Châlon-sur-Saône	Top 12
Centre	Laure Wojnecki	18	180 cm (5 ft 11 in)	Vierzon	October, 9 in Déols	
Champagne-Ardenne	Sarah Huard	21	171 cm (5 ft 7 1/2 in)	Reims	October, 21 in Sedan	
Corsica	Camille Mallea	20	172 cm (5 ft 7 1/2 in)	Bastelica	September, 3 in Grosseto-Prugna	
Côte d'Azur	Charlotte Murray	23	179 cm (5 ft 10 1/2 in)	Biot	August, 8 in Vallauris	4th Runner-Up
Franche-Comté	Andrea Vannier	19	176 cm (5 ft 9 1/2 in)	Pelousey	October, 28 in Poligny	
French Guiana	Anaële Veilleur	19	173 cm (5 ft 8 in)	Remire-Montjoly	October, 1st in Cayenne	Top 12
Guadeloupe	Cindy Le Pape	21	172 cm (5 ft 7 1/2 in)	Le Moule	July, 30 in Saine-Anne	
Île-de-France	Meggahnn Samson	20	180 cm (5 ft 11 in)	Paris	October, 14 in Torcy	
Languedoc	Alison Cossenet	19	172 cm (5 ft 7 1/2 in)	Cournonsec	August, 6 in Mauguio	6th Runner-Up
Limousin	Cindy Letoux	18	175 cm (5 ft 9 in)	Limoges	September, 18 in Limoges	
Lorraine	Maud Pisa	21	176 cm (5 ft 9 1/2 in)	Ham-sous-Varsberg	October, 1st in Sarreguemines	
Martinique	Charlène Civault	23	183 cm (6 ft 0 in)	Fort-de-France	July, 16 in Fort-de-France	5th Runner-Up
Mayotte	Aïcha Ahmed	20	174 cm (5 ft 8 1/2 in)	Mamoudzou	September, 3 in Koungou	
Midi-Pyrénées	Laura Madelain	18	177 cm (5 ft 9 1/2 in)	Figeac	October, 7 in Valence	Top 12
New Caledonia	Océane Bichot	20	178 cm (5 ft 10 in)	Nouméa	April, 23 in Nouméa	
Nord-Pas-de-Calais	Sophie Martin	21	173 cm (5 ft 8 in)	Douai	October, 22 in Saint-Amand-les-Eaux	
Normandy	Sophie Duval	20	177 cm (5 ft 9 1/2 in)	Saint-Martin-de-Bonfossé	September, 23 in Coutances	
Orléanais	Audrey Delafoy	19	170 cm (5 ft 7 in)	Illiers-Combray	October, 2 in Montargis	
Pays de Loire	Mathilde Couly	21	172 cm (5 ft 7 1/2 in)	Héric	September, 25 in Châteaubriant	1st Runner-Up
Pays de Savoie	Valentine Borel-Hoffmann	18	179 cm (5 ft 10 1/2 in)	Annecy	October, 15 in Chambéry	
Picardy	Anaïs Merle	20	174 cm (5 ft 8 1/2 in)	Cires-lès-Mello	October, 30 in Beauvais	
Poitou-Charentes	Manika Auxire	22	171 cm (5 ft 7 1/2 in)	Blanzac	September, 24 in Bressuire	
Provence	Solène Froment	19	181 cm (5 ft 11 1/2 in)	Aix-en-Provence	August, 7 in Sisteron	3rd Runner-Up
Réunion	Marie Payet	19	178 cm (5 ft 10 in)	Saint-Denis	July, 16 in Saint-Denis	2nd Runner-Up
Rhône-Alpes	Cindy Saroul	20	173 cm (5 ft 8 in)	Valence	October, 23 in Lagnieu	
Roussillon	Julie Vialo	19	170 cm (5 ft 7 in)	Toulouges	August, 5 in Banyuls-sur-Mer	Top 12
Saint-Pierre-et-Miquelon	Lison Yon	20	173 cm (5 ft 8 in)	Saint-Pierre	July, 9 in Saint-Pierre	
Tahiti	Rauata Temauri	22	170 cm (5 ft 7 in)	Arue	June, 24 in Papeete	

== Ranking ==
=== First round ===
A jury composed of partners (internal and external) of the company Miss France pre-selects 12 young women, during an interview that took place on 1 December.

Numero	Contestant
1	Miss Alsace
2	Miss Côte d'Azur
3	(Languedoc-Roussillon) Miss Languedoc
4	Miss Réunion
5	Miss Roussillon
6	Miss Brittany
7	Miss French Guiana
8	Miss Midi-Pyrénées
9	Miss Burgundy
10	Miss Martinique
11	Miss Provence
12	Miss Pays de Loire

=== Second round ===
The 50% jury and the 50% public choose the five candidates who can still be elected. A ranking of 1 to 12 is established for each of the two parties. In the event of a tie, the jury's ranking prevails : it explains the Top 5 placement of Miss Provence instead of Miss Martinique.

Miss	Public	Jury	Total
Miss Réunion	10	10	20
Miss Alsace	11	8	19
Miss Côte d'Azur	6	12	18
Miss Pays de Loire	12	6	18
Miss Provence	2	12	14
Miss Martinique	5	9	14
Miss Languedoc	9	4	13
Miss French Guiana	7	5	12
Miss Brittany	8	4	12
Miss Roussillon	1	7	8
Miss Burgundy	4	4	8
Miss Midi-Pyrénées	3	4	7

=== Last round ===
Only the audience can choose the winner and her runners-up by voting.

Candidates	Results
Miss Alsace	32.3 %
Miss Pays de Loire	31.6 %
Miss Réunion	23.5 %
Miss Provence	6.6 %
Miss Côte d'Azur	6 %

== Special prizes ==
Prize	Contestant
Prize of General Knowledge	Côte d'Azur – Charlotte Murray
Miss Congeniality	Martinique - Charlène Civault
Miss Photogenic	Centre - Laure Wojnecki
Miss Elegance	Brittany - Audrey Bönecker
Most beautiful smile Award	Île-de-France - Meggahnn Samson
Model Award	Réunion - Marie Payet

== Judges ==
Member
Alain Delon (president)	Actor
Francis Huster	Actor
Denis Brogniart	TV Host and journalist
Sofia Essaïdi	Singer, actress and dancer
Linda Hardy	Actress and Miss France 1992
Lorie	Singer and actress
Pascal Obispo	Singer

== Crossovers ==
Contestants who previously competed or will be competing at international beauty pageants:

Miss World

- 2012 : Alsace – Delphine Wespiser
  - (Ordos City, China)

Miss Universe

- 2012 : Réunion – Marie Payet (Top 10)
  - (Las Vegas, United States)

Miss Supranational

- 2012 : Provence – Solène Froment (Top 20)
  - (Warsaw, Poland)
