= Miss Poitou-Charentes =

- Type: Beauty pageant
- Headquarters: Poitou-Charentes, France
- Members: Miss France
- Official language: French
- Regional director: Éric Laurens
- Website: misspoitouchanrentes.fr

Miss Poitou-Charentes is a French beauty pageant which selects a representative for the Miss France national competition from the region of Poitou-Charentes. Women representing the region under various different titles have competed at Miss France since 1957, although the Miss Poitou-Charentes title was not used regularly until 2006.

The current Miss Poitou-Charentes is Mandy Goudal, who was crowned Miss Poitou-Charentes 2026 on 4 september 2026. Three women from Poitou-Charentes have been crowned Miss France:

- Monique Chiron, who was crowned Miss France 1959, competing as Miss Poitou
- Claudine Cassereau, who was crowned Miss France 1971, competing as Miss Poitou, following the resignation of the original winner
- Véronique Fagot, who was crowned Miss France 1977, competing as Miss Poitou

== Results summary ==
- Miss France: Monique Chiron (1958; Miss Poitou); Véronique Fagot (1976; Miss Poitou)
- 1st Runner-Up: Monique Boucher (1965; Miss Charente); Béatrice Demiaud (1966; Miss Royan); Nadine Labadie Wolf (1970; Miss Côte de Beauté); Claudine Cassereau (1971; Miss Poitou; later Miss France)
- 2nd Runner-Up: Marine Clouet (2000; Miss Poitou)
- 3rd Runner-Up: Michèle Mouix (1966; Miss Aunis)
- 5th Runner-Up: Mathilde Muller (2008)
- Top 12/Top 15: Stéphanie Loizeau (1995); Nancy Bourgeix (1996); Alexandra Bauduin (1997); Andréa Galland (2019); Justine Dubois (2020); Marine Paulais (2022)

== Titleholders ==
The regional title has been known as Miss Poitou-Charentes since 1997, while from 1995 to 1996, it was known as Miss Charentes-Poitou.

Year	Name	Age (Note: Ages at the time of Miss France)	Height	Hometown	Miss France placement	Notes
2026	Mandy Goudal	37	1.74 m (5 ft 8 1/2 in)	Saintes	TBA	
2025	Agathe Michelet	26	1.74 m (5 ft 8 1/2 in)	Saint-Sulpice-de-Royan		
2024	Charlie Bénard	27	1.70 m (5 ft 7 in)	La Couronne		
2023	Lounès Texier	19	1.73 m (5 ft 8 in)	Périgné		
2022	Marine Paulais	20	1.74 m (5 ft 8 1/2 in)	Bellevigne	Top 15	
2021	Lolita Ferrari	24	1.71 m (5 ft 7 1/2 in)	Rochefort		
2020	Justine Dubois	24	1.74 m (5 ft 8 1/2 in)	Angoulême	Top 15	
2019	Andréa Galland	20	1.72 m (5 ft 7 1/2 in)	Niort	Top 15	
2018	Marion Sokolik	23	1.74 m (5 ft 8 1/2 in)	Cognac		
2017	Ophélie Forgit	20	1.71 m (5 ft 7 1/2 in)	Arvert		
2016	Magdalène Chollet	19	1.72 m (5 ft 7 1/2 in)	Neuville-de-Poitou		
2015	Manon Rougier	19	1.79 m (5 ft 10 1/2 in)	Roullet-Saint-Estèphe		
2014	Mathilde Hubert	19	1.73 m (5 ft 8 in)	Cherves-Richemont		
2013	Laura Pierre	19	1.74 m (5 ft 8 1/2 in)	Le Gua		
2012	Typhanie Soulat	21	1.71 m (5 ft 7 1/2 in)	Fontaine-le-Comte		
2011	Manika Auxire	21	1.71 m (5 ft 7 1/2 in)	Blanzac-Porcheresse		
2010	Pearl Crosland	21	1.78 m (5 ft 10 in)	Angoulême		
2009	Rachel Jeannot	23	1.73 m (5 ft 8 in)	Civray		
2008	Mathilde Muller	19	1.77 m (5 ft 9 1/2 in)	Poitiers	Top 12 (5th Runner-Up)	Competed at Miss International 2009
2007	Clémence Dussagne	19	1.72 m (5 ft 7 1/2 in)	Dignac		
2006	Carine Bissirier	21	1.72 m (5 ft 7 1/2 in)	Poitiers		
1999	Sabrina Chauvelin					
1998	Sophie Bernardin					
1997	Alexandra Bauduin				Top 12	
1996	Nancy Bourgeix				Top 12	
1995	Stéphanie Loizeau				Top 12	

=== Miss Charente ===
In 1965, the department of Charente crowned its own representative for Miss France. In 1976, the department crowned its own representative again under the title Miss Angoulême.

Year	Name	Age	Height	Hometown	Miss France placement	Notes
1976	Évelyne Guérin					Guérin was crowned Miss Angoulême in 1976, and Miss Saintonge in 1977.
1965	Monique Boucher				1st Runner-Up	

=== Miss Charente-Maritime ===
In the 1960s and 1970s, the department of Charente-Maritime crowned its own representative for Miss France under various titles, including Miss Aunis (1966), Miss Côte de Beauté (1962; 1970), Miss La Rochelle (1976), Miss Oléron (1967), Miss Royan (1966), Miss Saintes (1962), and Miss Saintonge (1977).

Year	Name	Age	Height	Hometown	Miss France placement	Notes
1977	Évelyne Guérin					Guérin was crowned Miss Angoulême in 1976, and Miss Saintonge in 1977.
1976	Chantal Beaudonnet					
1970	Nadine Labadie Wolf				1st Runner-Up	
1967	Dany Nadeau					
1966	Michèle Mouix				3rd Runner-Up	Mouix was crowned Miss Aunis, while Demiaud was crowned Miss Royan.
1966	Béatrice Demiaud				1st Runner-Up	Mouix was crowned Miss Aunis, while Demiaud was crowned Miss Royan.
1962	Claudine Robin					Robin was crowned Miss Côte de Beauté, while Putier was crowned Miss Saintes.
1962	Danièle Putier					Robin was crowned Miss Côte de Beauté, while Putier was crowned Miss Saintes.

=== Miss Charentes ===
From the 1970s to the 2000s, the departments of Charente and Charente-Maritime competed separately under the title Miss Charentes.

Year	Name	Age	Height	Hometown	Miss France placement	Notes
2005	Chloé Lefebvre	23	1.73 m (5 ft 8 in)	Royan		
2004	Alvina Fournier	19	1.76 m (5 ft 9 1/2 in)			
2003	Gaëlle Coz			Saintes		
2002	Stéphanie Barreau					
2001	Eugénie Lassey			Cognac		
2000	Émilie Saint-Geours			Angoulême		
1994	Astrid Orioux					
1993	Laetitia Buraud					
1992	Linda Roy					
1991	Linda Pinson					
1990	Stéphanie Beau					
1989	Aline Menard					
1977	Béatrice Tixeuil					
1976	Catherine Dessèvre					Dessèvre was also crowned Miss Toulouse in both 1978 and 1977.

=== Miss Deux-Sèvres ===
In 1970, the department of Deux-Sèvres crowned its own representative for Miss France.

Year	Name	Age	Height	Hometown	Miss France placement	Notes
1970	Claudine Gatard					

=== Miss Poitou ===
From the 1950s to the 2000s, the departments of Deux-Sèvres, Vendée, and Vienne competed separately under the title Miss Poitou. Vendée is now located in Pays de la Loire, but women from the department were eligible to compete due to its historical ties to Poitou-Charentes.

Year	Name	Age	Height	Hometown	Miss France placement	Notes
2005	Reva Segonne					
2004	Charlotte Huneau					
2003	Julie Trèves					
2002	Amélie Drapeau					
2001	Caroline Talbot					
2000	Marine Clouet				2nd Runner-Up	
1992	Véronique Goubault					
1990	Rose-Marie Pinheiro					
1989	Stéphanie Vincente					
1979	Aïcha Atmani					
1978	Sophie Parola					Parola was later crowned Miss Centre-Ouest 1979.
1977	Murielle Bertraud					
1976	Véronique Fagot	16		Oiron	Miss France 1977	Top 15 at Miss World 1977
1971	Claudine Cassereau	19		Loudun	1st Runner-Up (later Miss France 1972)	Cassereau was originally the first runner-up, but took over as Miss France 1972 after the original winner suffered severe injuries from falling off of a horse and resigned the title.
1970	Chantal Charruault					
1958	Monique Chiron	21			Miss France 1959	
1957	Françoise Radureau					

=== Miss Vienne ===
In 1979, the department of Vienne crowned its own representative for Miss France.

Year	Name	Age	Height	Hometown	Miss France placement	Notes
1979	Brigitte Moreau					
