= Miss Centre-Val de Loire =

- Type: Beauty pageant
- Headquarters: Centre-Val de Loire, France
- Members: Miss France
- Official language: French
- Regional director: Stéphanie Chanoine

Miss Centre-Val de Loire is a French beauty pageant which selects a representative for the Miss France national competition from the region of Centre-Val de Loire. Women representing the region under various titles have competed at Miss France since 1928, although the Miss Centre-Val de Loire title was not used regularly until 2015.

The current Miss Centre-Val de Loire is Justine Bourrelier, who was crowned Miss Centre-Val de Loire 2026 on 26 April 2026. One woman from Centre-Val de Loire has been crowned Miss France:

- Flora Coquerel, who was crowned Miss France 2014, competing as Miss Orléanais

== Results summary ==
- Miss France: Flora Coquerel (2013; Miss Orléanais)
- 2nd Runner-Up: Karine Richefeu (1989); Amélie Rudler (1998; Miss Berry)
- 4th Runner-Up: Annie Fraile (1970; Miss Touraine)
- 5th Runner-Up: Sandrine Pétoin (1994; Miss Berry); Élodie Thomas (2005; Miss Berry); Cassandre Rolland (2009; Miss Orléanais)
- Top 12/Top 15: Stéphanie Sabourin (1993; Miss Orléanais); Ludivine Julio (1995; Miss Touraine-Sologne); Barbara Niewidziala (1996; Miss Berry); Bérengère Clément (1998; Miss Touraine-Sologne); Anne-Sophie Masson (2003; Miss Berry); Nadège Dabrowski (2006; Miss Berry-Val de Loire); Aline Moreau (2008; Miss Berry-Val de Loire); Chanel Haye (2010; Miss Orléanais); Amanda Xeres (2014); Margaux Bourdin (2015); Jade Simon-Abadie (2019); Emmy Gisclon (2023)

== Gallery ==
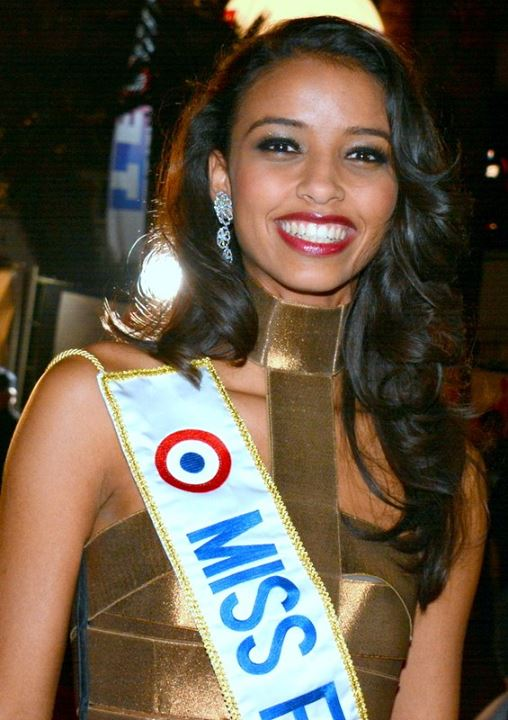
Miss Orléanais 2013 and Miss France 2014
Flora Coquerel

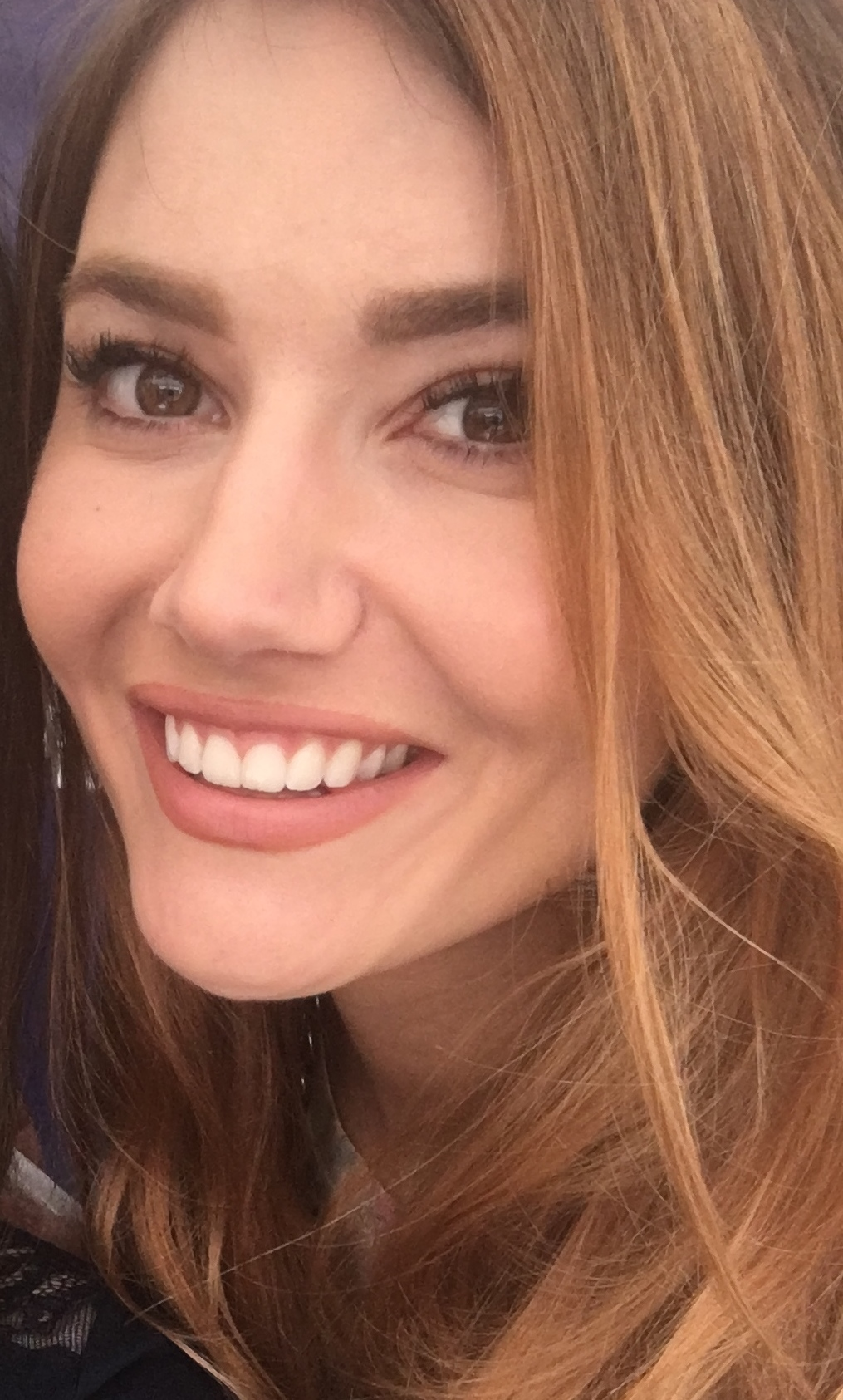
Miss Berry-Val de Loire 2006
Nadège Dabrowski

== Titleholders ==
The regional title has been known as Miss Centre-Val de Loire since 2015, while it was known as Miss Centre from 2010 to 2014.

From 1976 to 1992, the title was called Miss Centre-Ouest.

Year	Name	Age (Note: Ages at the time of Miss France)	Height	Hometown	Miss France placement	Notes
2026	Justine Bourrelier	25	1.76 m (5 ft 9 1/2 in)	Dammarie	TBD	
2025	Anna Valero	19	1.74 m (5 ft 8 1/2 in)	Tours		
2024	Tiffanny Haie	18	1.76 m (5 ft 9 1/2 in)	Rouvres		
2023	Emmy Gisclon	22	1.76 m (5 ft 9 1/2 in)	Chambray-lès-Tours	Top 15	
2022	Coraline Lerasle	22	1.77 m (5 ft 9 1/2 in)	Ballan-Miré		Lerasle resigned her title for personal reasons on 23 December 2022, and her predecessor, Jade Lange, stepped in to complete her reign.
2021	Jade Lange	19	1.75 m (5 ft 9 in)	Malesherbes		Lerasle resigned her title for personal reasons on 23 December 2022, and her predecessor, Jade Lange, stepped in to complete her reign.
2020	Cloé Delavalle	23	1.72 m (5 ft 7 1/2 in)	Chartres		
2019	Jade Simon-Abadie	23	1.73 m (5 ft 8 in)	Neuillé-le-Lierre	Top 15	
2018	Laurie Derouard	23	1.75 m (5 ft 9 in)	Champhol		
2017	Marie Thorin	20	1.77 m (5 ft 9 1/2 in)	Mennetou-sur-Cher		
2016	Cassandre Joris	20	1.70 m (5 ft 7 in)	Prasville		
2015	Margaux Bourdin	18	1.75 m (5 ft 9 in)	Châteauneuf-en-Thymerais	Top 12 (6th Runner-Up)	
2014	Amanda Xeres	18	1.75 m (5 ft 9 in)	Saint-Doulchard	Top 12	
2013	Laure Moreau	20	1.80 m (5 ft 11 in)	Saint-Maur		
2012	Juliette Aquilina Reis	21	1.72 m (5 ft 7 1/2 in)	Saint-Amand-Montrond		
2011	Laure Wojnecki	18	1.80 m (5 ft 11 in)	Vierzon		
2010	Sarah Perrin	23	1.70 m (5 ft 7 in)	Champillet		
1992	Christelle Landeau					
1991	Agnès Fradet					
1990	Katia Terouinard					
1989	Karine Richefeu				2nd Runner-Up	
1988	Sophie Massard					
1987	Évelyne Poignet					
1986	Claude Savignard					
1985	Christine Mau					
1985	Christine Mau					
1984	Véronique Bodier					
1981	Sylvie Detoisien					
1979	Sophie Parola					Parola was previously crowned Miss Poitou 1978.
1976	Lydia Ehereau					

=== Miss Berry ===
From 1994 to 2005, the departments of Cher and Indre competed separately under the title Miss Berry. From 2006 to 2009, the title was known as Miss Berry-Val de Loire.

Year	Name	Age	Height	Hometown	Miss France placement	Notes
2009	Élodie Martel	19	1.72 m (5 ft 7 1/2 in)	Châteauroux		
2008	Aline Moreau	19	1.75 m (5 ft 9 in)	Châteauroux	Top 12	
2007	Aurélie Birbaud	20	1.81 m (5 ft 11 1/2 in)	Salbris		
2006	Nadège Dabrowski	19	1.76 m (5 ft 9 1/2 in)	Saint-Cyr-sur-Loire	Top 12	
2005	Élodie Thomas	23	1.74 m (5 ft 8 1/2 in)	Champillet	Top 12 (5th Runner-Up)	
2004	Séverine Sauvagère	20	1.76 m (5 ft 9 1/2 in)	Châteauroux		
2003	Anne-Sophie Masson				Top 12	
2002	Émilie Dejouhannet			Châteauroux		
2001	Virginie Leglaive			Arçay		Leglaive's daughter Lola Turpin was crowned Miss Aquitaine 2023.
2000	Pauline Claudet			La Guerche-sur-l'Aubois		
1999	Anne Duponchel	19	1.75 m (5 ft 9 in)	Bourges		
1998	Amélie Rudler	18	1.75 m (5 ft 9 in)	Châteauroux	2nd Runner-Up	
1997	Géraldine Allard					
1996	Barbara Niewidziala			Vineuil	Top 12	
1995	Caroline de Vallois			La Berthenoux		
1994	Sandrine Pétoin				Top 12 (5th Runner-Up)	

=== Miss Indre ===
In 1970, the department of Indre crowned its own representative for Miss France.

Year	Name	Age	Height	Hometown	Miss France placement	Notes
1970	Marie-Chantal Clerte					

=== Miss Loir-et-Cher ===
In 1979, the department of Loir-et-Cher crowned its own representative for Miss France.

Year	Name	Age	Height	Hometown	Miss France placement	Notes
1979	Ghislaine Raineau					Raineau was previously crowned Miss Touraine 1978.

=== Miss Orléanais ===
From 1993 to 2014, the departments of Eure-et-Loir, Loir-et-Cher, and Loiret competed separately under the title Miss Orléanais. In 1976 and 1977, the title was called Miss Orléans and represented just Loiret.

Year	Name	Age	Height	Hometown	Miss France placement	Notes
2014	Solène Salmagne	19	1.75 m (5 ft 9 in)	Nogent-le-Roi		
2013	Flora Coquerel	19	1.82 m (5 ft 11 1/2 in)	Morancez	Miss France 2014	Competed at Miss World 2014 Top 5 at Miss Universe 2015
2012	Joy Lartigue	21	1.72 m (5 ft 7 1/2 in)	Pierres		
2011	Audrey Delafoy	19	1.70 m (5 ft 7 in)	Illiers-Combray		
2010	Chanel Haye	20	1.76 m (5 ft 9 1/2 in)	Luisant	Top 12	
2009	Cassandre Rolland	18	1.71 m (5 ft 7 1/2 in)	Marcilly-en-Villette	Top 12 (5th Runner-Up)	
2008	Marion Tricot	19	1.76 m (5 ft 9 1/2 in)	Morancez		
2007	Sandrine Midon	18	1.72 m (5 ft 7 1/2 in)			
2006	Valentine Maurel	21	1.77 m (5 ft 9 1/2 in)	Saint-Firmin-sur-Loire		
2005	Anne-Charlotte Triplet	18	1.82 m (5 ft 11 1/2 in)	La Ferté-Saint-Aubin		
2004	Laetitia Winter	23	1.77 m (5 ft 9 1/2 in)	Nogent-le-Rotrou		
2003	Angélique Dombard					
2002	Stéphanie Chanoine			Dreux		
2001	Magalie Girard			Orléans		
2000	Delphine Dechambre			Montargis		
1999	Hélène Schott-Simonin	18	1.77 m (5 ft 9 1/2 in)			
1998	Stéphanie Amette	23	1.74 m (5 ft 8 1/2 in)			
1997	Adeline Pillon					
1996	Mélanie Muller					
1995	Diane Le Sidaner					
1994	Isabelle Marquet					
1993	Stéphanie Sabourin				Top 12	
1977	Véronique Monfrance					
1976	Annie Carré					

=== Miss Sologne-Val de Loire ===
From 2000 to 2002, the departments of Cher, Loir-et-Cher, and Loiret competed separately under the title Miss Sologne-Val de Loire.

Year	Name	Age	Height	Hometown	Miss France placement	Notes
2002	Nadège Traca					
2001	Carole Roques					
2000	Alexandra Marlière					

=== Miss Touraine ===
In the 1970s, 1980s, and 2000s, the departments of Indre and Indre-et-Loire competed separately under the title Miss Touraine.

Year	Name	Age	Height	Hometown	Miss France placement	Notes
2005	Justine Lepsch	23	1.76 m (5 ft 9 1/2 in)	Tours		
2004	Émilie Lebeur	19	1.77 m (5 ft 9 1/2 in)			
2003	Audrey Michaud					
2002	Julia Loiseau			Loches		
1985	Élisabeth Rabbolini					
1983	Isabelle Herrick					
1981	Brigitte Bodier			Château-la-Vallière		
1978	Ghislaine Raineau					Raineau was later crowned Miss Loit-et-Cher 1979.
1977	Sylvie Gaultier					
1976	Annick Brillet			Monthou-sur-Cher		
1970	Annie Fraile				4th Runner-Up	

=== Miss Touraine-Sologne ===
From 1995 to 1999, the region crowned a representative under the title Miss Touraine-Sologne.

Year	Name	Age	Height	Hometown	Miss France placement	Notes
1999	Karine Bouvier	23	1.84 m (6 ft 1/2 in)			
1998	Bérengère Clément	19	1.82 m (5 ft 11 1/2 in)		Top 12	
1997	Blandine Bourdeau					
1996	Murielle Hoarau					
1995	Ludivine Julio				Top 12	

=== Miss Tours ===
In 1970, the department of Indre-et-Loire competed separately under the title Miss Tours.

Year	Name	Age	Height	Hometown	Miss France placement	Notes
1970	Chantal Rourer					
