= Delphine Wespiser =

Miss France 2012, contestant in Miss World 2012

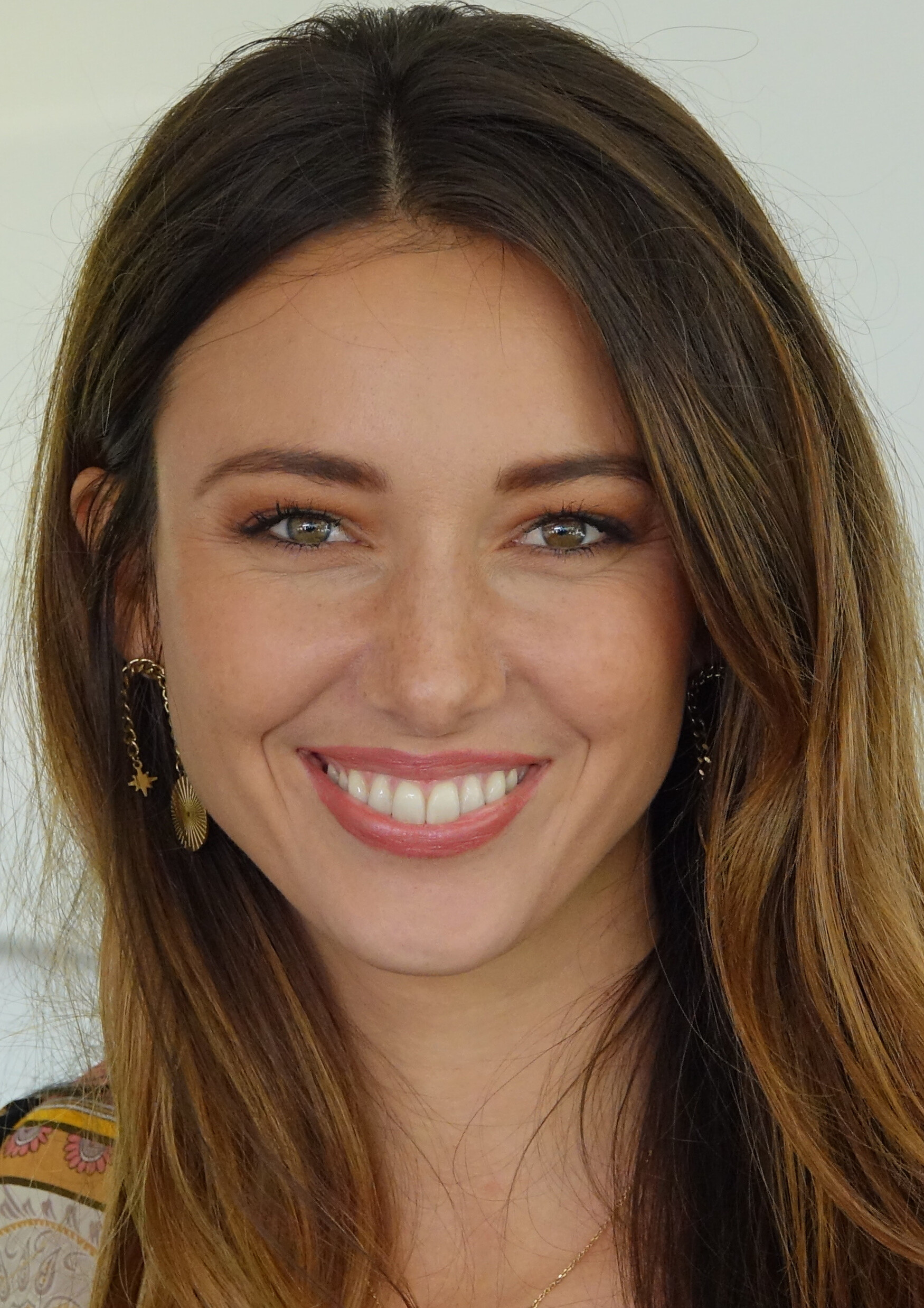
- Wespiser in 2021
- Born: 3 January 1992 (age 34); Mulhouse, Haut-Rhin, France
- Height: 1.75 m (5 ft 9 in)
- Beauty pageant titleholder
- Title: Miss Haut-Rhin 2011; Miss Alsace 2011; Miss France 2012
- Hair color: Brown
- Eye color: Green
- Major competitions: Miss France 2012 (Winner); Miss World 2012 (Unplaced)

Delphine Wespiser (born 3 January 1992) is a French model, TV host, politician and beauty pageant titleholder. She was elected Miss Haut-Rhin 2011, Miss Alsace 2011 and Miss France 2012.

== Biography ==
Delphine Wespiser is from Magstatt-le-Bas, located in the department of Haut-Rhin. She is the daughter of an architect father and a laboratory technician mother and has an older brother. She spent her entire childhood and did her schooling in the region of Alsace. In 2010, she passed her high school final exams in economics and social studies. She then studied international business management, joining the IUT in Colmar.

She was crowned Miss Alsace 2011 in Kingersheim, Haut-Rhin on 2 October 2011. Two months later, she was crowned Miss France 2012 in Brest.

Delphine is the spokesperson of many charitable organizations like "Caravane de la vie" for blood donation. She also defends animal welfare with the International Fund for Animal Welfare, and is a vegetarian. Because of these beliefs, she also had interest in becoming a veterinarian.

In addition to French, she is fluent in English and German. She also speaks Alsatian and promotes the use of regional languages.

== Miss France 2012 ==
=== Election ===
Delphine Wespiser was crowned Miss France 2012 on 3 December 2011 in Brest, succeeding Miss France 2011 Laury Thilleman, obtaining 32.3% from the votes of the audience.

Her runner-ups are:

- 1st runner-up: Miss Pays de Loire, Mathilde Couly
- 2nd runner-up: Miss Réunion, Marie Payet; Miss Universe France 2012
- 3rd runner-up: Miss Provence, Solène Froment
- 4th runner-up: Miss Côte d'Azur, Charlotte Murray
- 5th runner-up: Miss Martinique, Charlène Civault
- 6th runner-up: Miss Languedoc, Alison Cossenet

=== Miss World ===
On 18 August 2012, Delphine Wespiser represented France during the Miss World 2012 election in Ordos City in the region of Inner Mongolia in China, where she failed to reach the semi-final. Her second runner-up Marie Payet participated at the Miss Universe 2012 title on 19 December 2012 in Las Vegas.

=== Miss France year ===
On 28 January 2012, she gave an award at the thirteenth ceremony of the NRJ Music Awards, broadcast live on TF1 at the Midem of Cannes. During that year, Delphine Wespiser met Miss Switzerland 2011 Alina Buchschacher, Miss Ukraine 2012, and Oleysia Stefanko, first runner-up of Miss Universe 2011, as well as other personalities.

She then participated in a special Miss France episode of the game show Fort Boyard, filmed at night and broadcast for Halloween 2012 with former Miss France Sylvie Tellier, Corinne Coman, Lætitia Bléger, Laury Thilleman and journalist Christophe Beaugrand for the International Fund for Animal Welfare. She also participated in the program Un dîner presque parfait (French version of Come Dine with Me) on M6 on the week from Monday 19 to Friday 23 November 2012 in Mulhouse. The program was broadcast again in December 2016 on W9.

== Career after Miss France ==
=== Television ===
After participating as a candidate in Fort Boyard on 31 October 2012 on France 2 during her Miss France year, she became one of the characters of the game show since summer 2013. She has been playing the role of the judge Blanche and since June 2015, she also plays her twin sister Rouge.

She participated in the game show N'oubliez pas les paroles! on France 2 in January 2013. She played with Thomas Hugues and another anonymous contestant for the association Emmaüs Solidarité, and later in January 2015 with Dany Brillant. She also participated several times on the game show Mot de passe (French version of Million Dollar Password) on France 2.

From Monday 10 to Friday 14 April 2017, she participated again in Un Dîner presque parfait in Strasbourg and broadcast on W9. Television presenter Jérôme Anthony was part of the contestants.

=== Politics ===
In 2014, she was a candidate in the municipal elections in Magstatt-le-Bas, on the list of the independent outgoing mayor. She was elected in the first round on 23 March 2014, when the list garnered 51.55% of the votes. She was elected to the council and served for 6 years after deciding to not seek re-election in the 2020 municipal elections. On January 5 and 6, 2022 during the show Touche pas a mon poste!, about the COVID-19 vaccine, she publicly declared against vaccination of children. She claims that following the vaccination campaign, there have been deaths and calls the pro-vaccination doctor, Laurent Alexandre, who claims the opposite, a liar. During the debate, she confirmed that she had been vaccinated completely reluctantly in order to be able to travel. On April 13, 2022, on the set of Don't touch my post!, she re-displayed her hostility towards Emmanuel Macron and estimated, implying Marine Le Pen, {I would like to have a female president, I would like a mother of the French, who unites, who protects, with a woman's sensitivity. We know very well that men talk a lot. Delphine Wespiser claims that Marine Le Pen has a form of benevolence. In an article on the trivialization of far-right ideas in France, the newspaper Le Monde returns to this episode by noting that the former Miss France was not worried about her comments while some time ago, such an outing would have been synonymous with expulsion from the French audiovisual landscape. On February 1, 2024, she declared on Sud Radio: "I love Jordan Bardella. I find him very intelligent, I find him brilliant. I think he has a presidential future".

== Beauty pageants ==
- Miss Haut-Rhin 2011, crowned on 26 March 2011 in Lutterbach.
- Miss Alsace 2011, crowned on 2 October 2011 in Kingersheim.
- Miss France 2012, crowned on 3 December 2011 in Brest.
- Unplaced at Miss World 2012, on 18 August 2012 in Ordos City, China.

Awards and achievements
| Preceded by (Auvergne) Clémence Olesky | Miss World France; 2012 | Succeeded by (Burgundy) Marine Lorphelin |
| Preceded by (Brittany) Laury Thilleman | Miss France; 2012 | Succeeded by (Burgundy) Marine Lorphelin |
| Preceded by Mathilde Buecher | Miss Alsace; 2011 | Succeeded by Emilie Koenig |
| Preceded by Tiffany Yousfi | Miss Haut-Rhin; 2011 | Succeeded by Marine Schnebelen |
