= Laury Thilleman =

French beauty queen

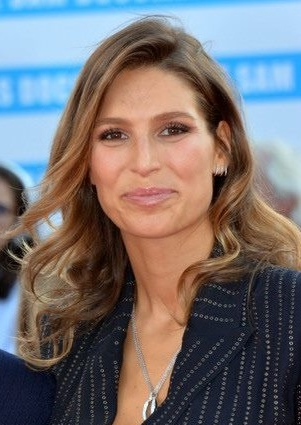
- Born: Laury Betty Thilleman; 30 July 1991 (age 35); Brest, Brittany, France
- Height: 1.78 m (5 ft 10 in)
- Spouse: Juan Arbelaez (m. 2019; sep. 2022)
- Beauty pageant titleholder
- Title: Miss Bretagne Nord 2010; Miss Bretagne 2010; Miss France 2011
- Major competitions: Miss France 2011 (Winner); Miss Universe 2011 (Top 10)

Laury Betty Thilleman (born 30 July 1991) is a French actress, journalist, model, tv host and beauty pageant titleholder who was crowned Miss France 2011 on 4 December 2010. She made the top 10 at Miss Universe 2011.

She graduated from ESC Bretagne Brest. In 2019, Thilleman became an ambassador for UNICEF in France.

== Miss France ==
Thilleman, who stands 1.78 m (5 ft 10 in) tall, competed as Miss Bretagne in her country's national beauty pageant, Miss France 2011, held in Caen, where she became the eventual winner of the title, gaining the right to represent France in the Miss Universe 2011 pageant.

== Miss Universe ==
Thilleman was France's contestant in Miss Universe 2011 held in São Paulo (Brazil) and ranked in top 10 (6th runner up), her 2nd runner-up in Miss France pageant, Clémence Olesky (Miss Auvergne) represented France at the Miss World pageant, held in London. In a phone interview with the newspapers Première, she had been asked what she thought about the pageant winner (Leila Lopes, Miss Angola), she replied, "She was the only girl I didn't know very well. We didn't see her much; she was very discreet. She was often in jeans and not wearing makeup. We were all surprised by her win. Many girls made efforts that were not rewarded. I don't know, something is missing in her temperament. The fact that the competition was held in Brazil surely played a role." Because of this declaration, the Washington Post made an article considering her words as scandalous, "offering some nasty, sore loser, sour grapes, culturally imperious comments about Miss Angola".

== Danse avec les stars ==
In 2013, she took part on the fourth season of French show Danse avec les stars (Dancing with the stars). She finished on seventh place with her dancing partner Maxime Dereymez. On 26 October 2013, they were eliminated finishing 7th out of 10 contestants. She also attended the first Danse avec les stars tour.

== Personal life ==
Thilleman married chef Juan Arbelaez on 21 December 2019 in Brest. On 17 May 2022, the couple announced their separation. She is of Breton descent.

Awards and achievements
Preceded by Malika Ménard	Miss Universe France; 2011	Succeeded by Marie Payet
Preceded by Malika Ménard	Miss France; 2011	Succeeded by Delphine Wespiser
Preceded by Mélanie Craignou	Miss Brittany; 2010	Succeeded by Audrey Bönecker
Preceded by Not awarded	Miss North Brittany; 2010	Succeeded by Not awarded

Preceded by Iveta Mukuchyan, Garik Papoyan and Karina Ignatyan	Junior Eurovision Song Contest presenter 2023; With: Olivier Minne and Ophenya	Succeeded by Ruth Lorenzo, Marc Clotet and Melani García
