= Marie Payet =

French singer and model (born 1992)

- Born: Marie Payet; 17 August 1992 (age 34); Réunion, France
- Height: 1.78 m (5 ft 10 in)
- Beauty pageant titleholder
- Title: Miss Réunion 2011; Miss Universe France 2012
- Hair color: Brown
- Eye color: Brown
- Major competitions: Miss Réunion 2008; (4th Runner-Up); Miss Réunion 2011; (Winner); Miss France 2012; (2nd Runner-Up); Miss Universe 2012; (Top 10)

Marie Payet (born 17 August 1992 in Réunion) is a French singer, model and beauty pageant titleholder who was crowned Miss Réunion 2011 and second runner-up in Miss France 2012, behind Delphine Wespiser. She went on to place in the top ten in Miss Universe 2012.

== Pageantry ==
=== Miss Reunion ===
Payet was crowned Miss Reunion on 16 July 2011. She succeeded Florence Arginthe. She was automatically qualified for the Miss France 2012 pageant.

=== Miss France ===
Delphine Wespiser, Miss Alsace 2011, was crowned Miss France 2012, and subsequently competed in Miss World 2012. Marie —Miss Reunion 2011—placed as 2nd runner-up, earning the right to represent France in Miss Universe 2012 in Las Vegas, USA, on 19 December.

=== Miss Universe ===
Marie Payet finished in the top 10 at Miss Universe 2012. Where she finished in 6th place.

== Career ==
On 12 November 2013, Payet auditioned for the third season of The Voice: la plus belle voix, broadcast on TF1 from 11 January 2014 to 10 May 2014. In the blind auditions, Payet performed This Love (Maroon 5). Unfortunately, none of the coaches turned for her.

== Discography ==
Marie Payet's first passion is music. During her reign as Miss Reunion 2011, a famous Reunionese singer called Bernard Joron, leader of the group Ousanousava, write a song for her. This song entitled 'Fleur Créole' is about the beauty of Métis women.

=== Single ===
- 2012 : Fleur Créole

Awards and achievements
Preceded by (Brittany) Laury Thilleman	Miss Universe France; 2012	Succeeded by (French Polynesia) Hinarani de Longeaux
Preceded by (Auvergne) Clémence Oleksy	Miss France 2nd Runner-Up; 2012	Succeeded by (Nord-Pas-de-Calais) Sophie Garénaux
Preceded by Florence Arginthe	Miss Réunion; 2011	Succeeded by Stéphanie Robert
