= Magstatt-le-Bas =

Commune in Grand Est, France

Magstatt-le-Bas Màschgetz
- Commune
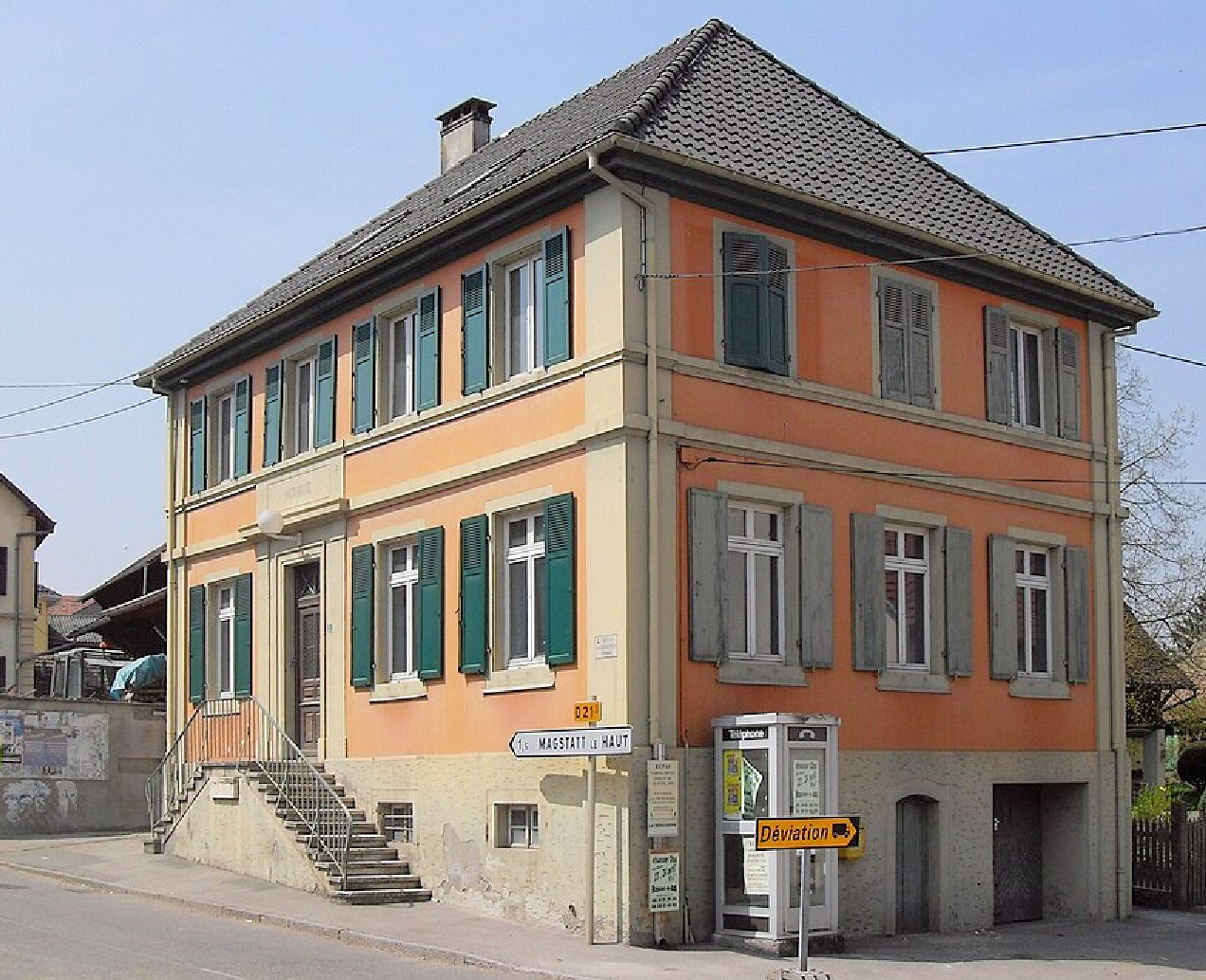
- The town hall in Magstatt-le-Bas

- Coat of arms
- Location of Magstatt-le-Bas
- Location within France Location within Grand Est
- Coordinates: 47°38′22″N 7°24′35″E
- Country: France
- Region: Grand Est
- Department: Haut-Rhin
- Arrondissement: Mulhouse
- Canton: Brunstatt-Didenheim
- Intercommunality: Saint-Louis Agglomération

Government
  - Mayor (2020–2026): Serge Fuchs
- Area^{1}: 3.35 km^{2} (1.29 sq mi)
- Elevation: 310 m (1,020 ft)
- Highest elevation: 395 m (1,296 ft)
- Lowest elevation: 287 m (942 ft)
- Population (2023): 517
  - Density: 154/km^{2} (400/sq mi)
- Time zone: UTC+01:00 (CET)
  - Summer (DST): UTC+02:00 (CEST)
- INSEE/Postal code: 68197 /68510
- ^{1} French Land Register data, which excludes lakes, ponds, glaciers > 1 km^{2} (0.386 sq mi or 247 acres) and river estuaries.

Magstatt-le-Bas (Alemannic German: Màschgetz; German: Niedermagstatt) is a commune in the Haut-Rhin department in Alsace in north-eastern France.

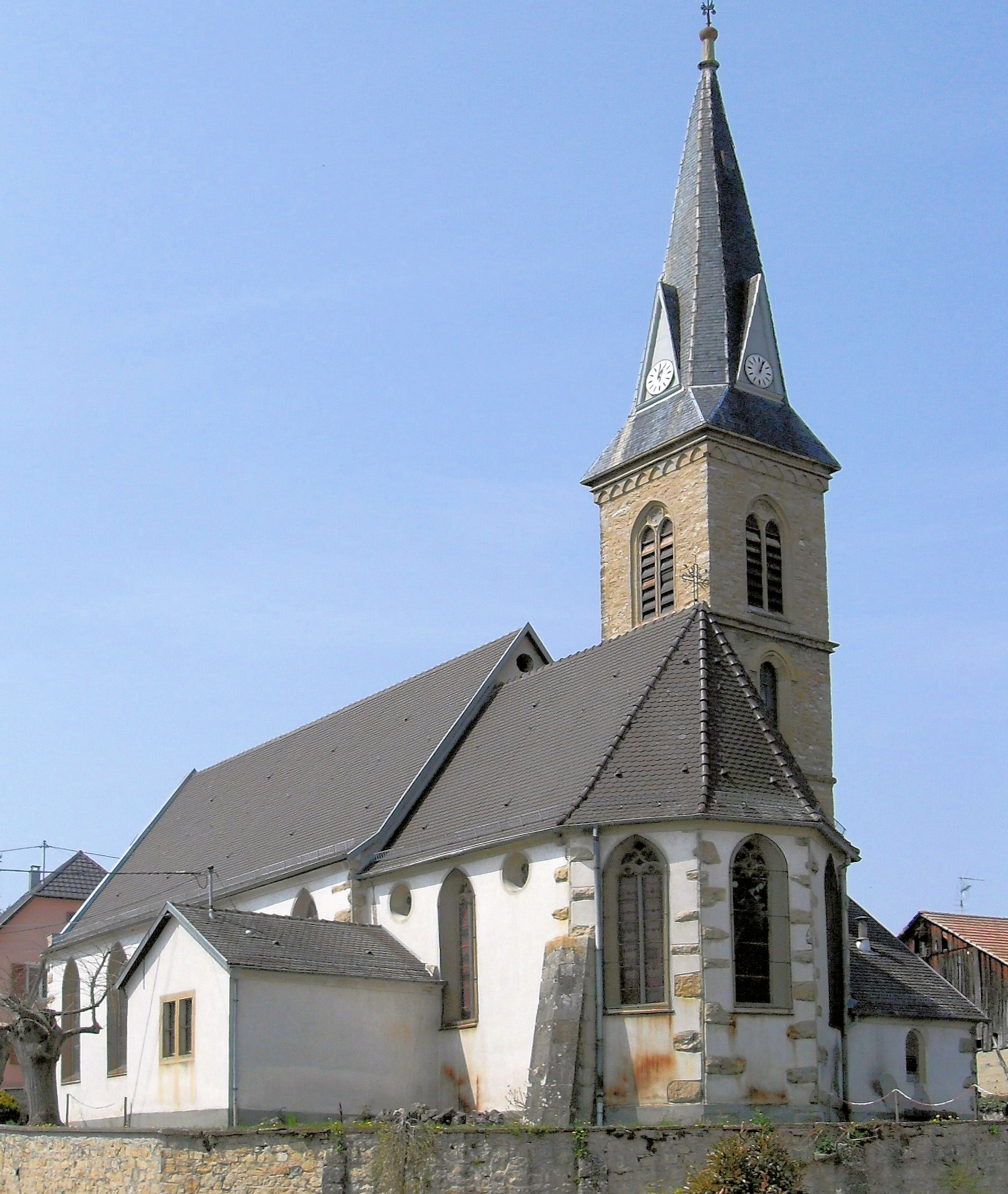
Saint-Michel Church

== See also ==
- Communes of the Haut-Rhin département
- Magstatt-le-Haut
