= Miss France 2011 =

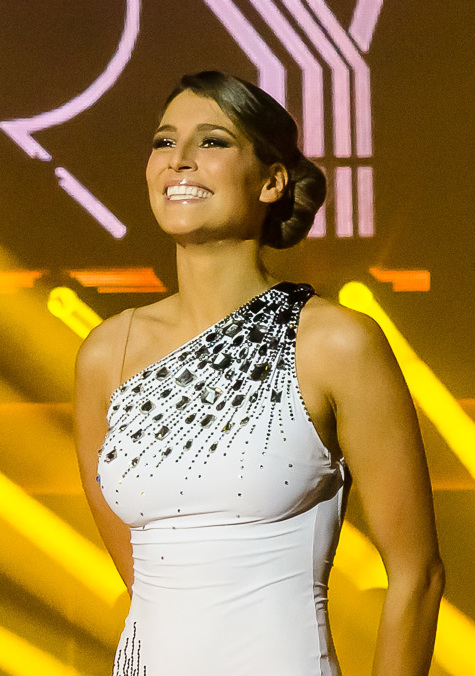
- Laury Thilleman
- Date: 4 December 2010
- Presenters: Jean-Pierre Foucault
- Venue: Zénith de Caen, Caen
- Broadcaster: TF1
- Entrants: 33
- Placements: 12
- Debuts: Miss Centre
- Withdrawals: Miss Albigeois Midi-Pyrénées, Artois Hainaut, Miss Béarn-Gascogne, Miss Berry Val de Loire, Miss Flandre, Miss Loire Forez, Miss Paris, Miss Quercy Rouergue
- Returns: Miss Midi-Pyrénées, Miss New Caledonia, Miss Nord-Pas-de-Calais
- Winner: Laury Thilleman; Brittany
- Congeniality: Julie-Malika Grosse; French Guiana
- Photogenic: Maëva Pax; Lorraine

Miss France 2011 was the 64th Miss France pageant, held at the Zénith de Caen in Caen, France, on 4 December 2010. Laury Thilleman of Brittany was crowned the winner at the end of the event.

== Results ==
=== Placements ===
Placement	Contestant
Miss France 2011	Brittany – Laury Betty Thilleman
1st Runner-Up	Languedoc – Jenna Sylvestre
2nd Runner-Up	Auvergne – Clémence Oleksy
3rd Runner-Up	Picardy – Anastasia Winnebroot
4th Runner-Up	Île-de-France – Sabine Hossenbaccus
Top 12	Provence – Analisa Kebaili (5th runner-up); Martinique – Anaïs Corosine (6th runner-up); Corsica – Jade Morel; Côte d'Azur – Marine Laugier; Normandy – Juliette Polge; Orléanais – Chanel Haye; Roussillon – Marion Castaing
