= Miss Russia 2010 =

18th edition of the Miss Russia competition

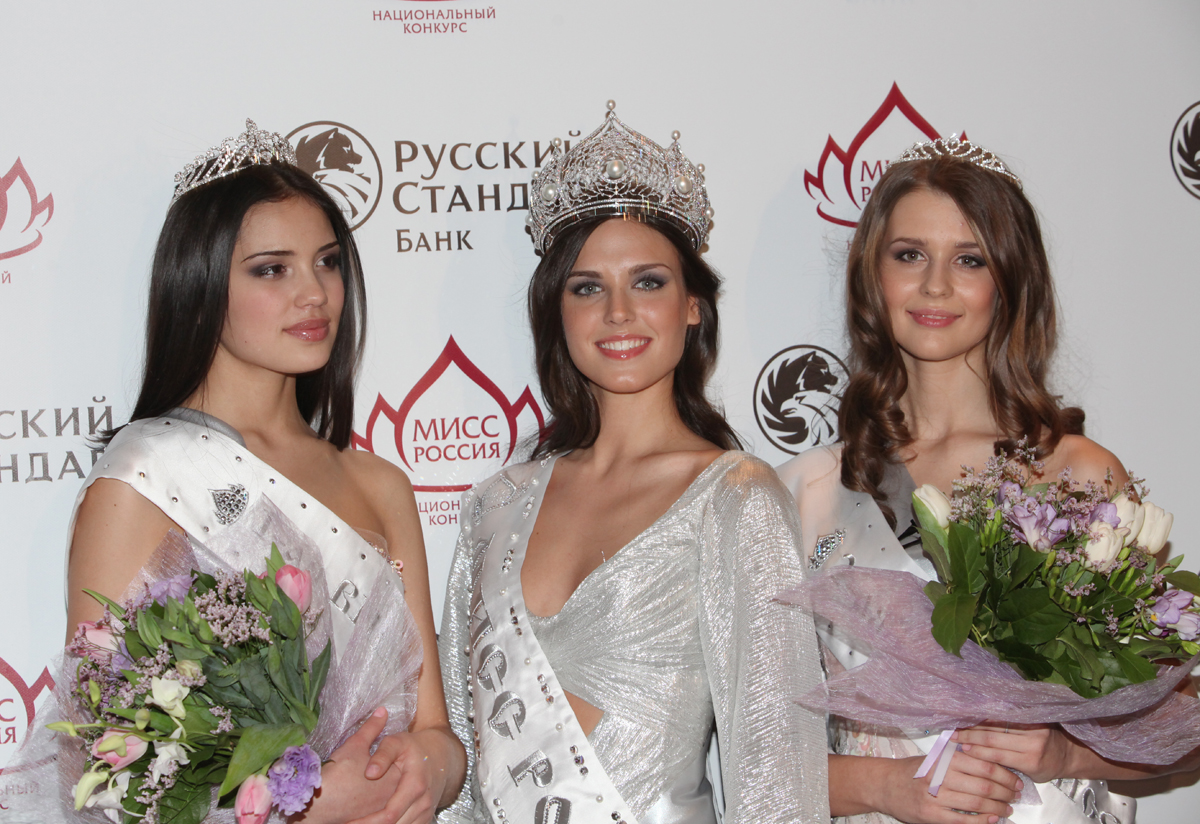
- Miss Russia 2010
- Date: 6 March 2010
- Presenters: Garik Martirosyan and Alsou
- Entertainment: Zhanna Friske, Philip Kirkorov, Mumiy Troll, Band'Eros, Igor Butman
- Venue: Concert Hall Barvikha Luxury Village, Moscow
- Broadcaster: NTV
- Entrants: 51
- Placements: 15
- Winner: Irina Antonenko; Yekaterinburg

Miss Russia 2010 the 18th edition of the Miss Russia pageant, was held in Barvikha Luxury Village Concert Hall in Moscow on 6 March 2010. 51 contestants from all over Russia competed for the crown. Sofia Rudieva of Saint Petersburg crowned her successor, Irina Antonenko of Yekaterinburg, at the end of the event. Stefania Fernandez and Kaiane Aldorino participated in the event.

== The preparatory phase ==
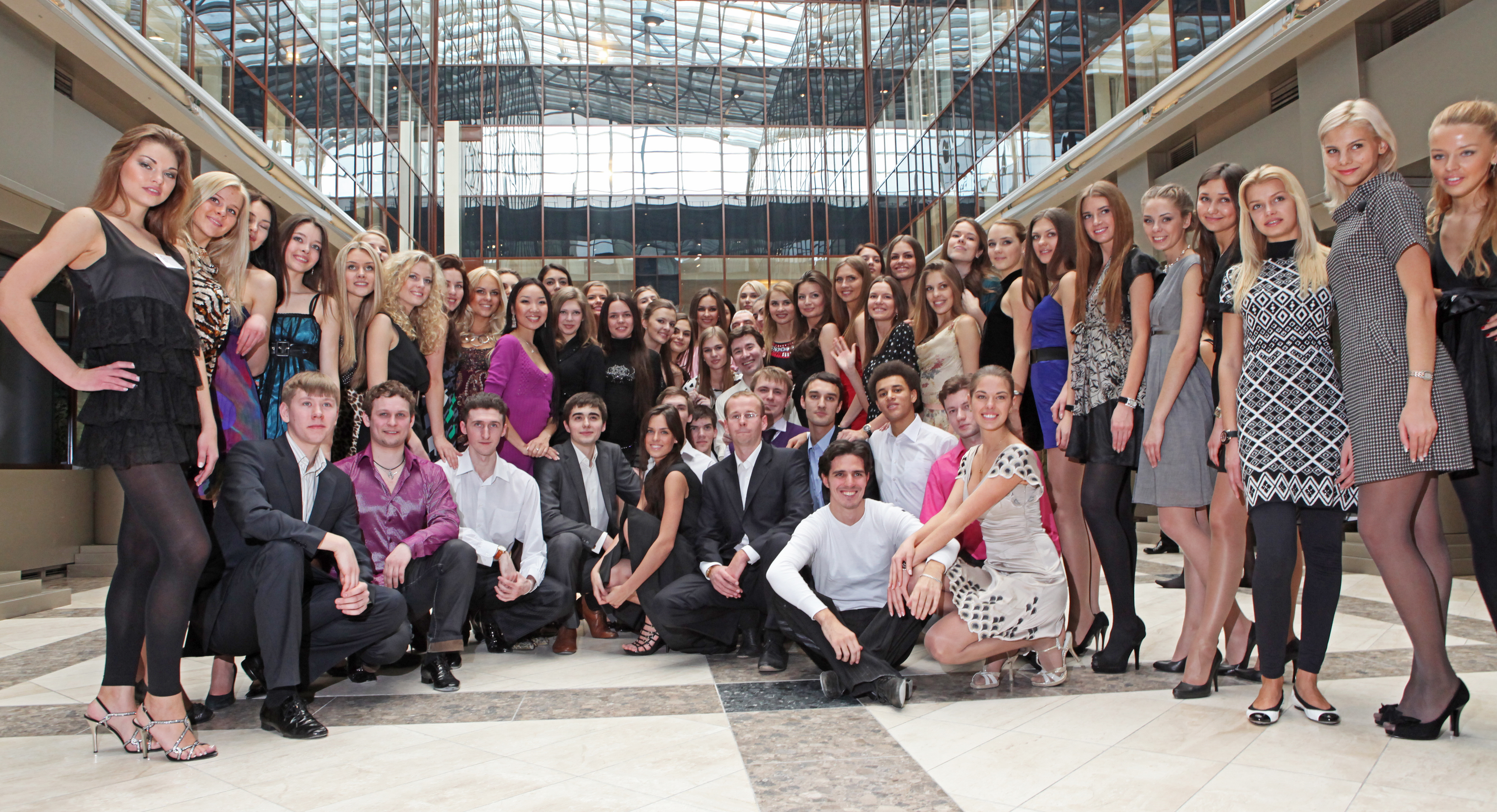
14 February 2010. Finalists of Miss Russia 2010, a rehearsal of the Eighth Viennese Ball in Moscow "

From October to December 2009 and a series of large-scale preliminary rounds. Take part in the qualifying round could any girl satisfying the following conditions: age from 17 to 22 years, rising from 175 cm, the presence of Russian citizenship.

12 February 2010 and the pretender to the title of Miss Russia 2010 "were gathered in Moscow at a preparatory stage for the final awards ceremony. Girls byle located in the suburban five-star hotel "Imperial Park Hotel & SPA». With finalists for a month working stylists beauty "Monet". Also, regular classes in dance fitness y, speech technique and shows. For the finalists was drawn up a special menu that includes dishes from lean fish, meat, and turkey, light soups, as well as a large number of vegetables and fruits. Use Spirits baking and chocolate and was completely prohibited.

14 February 2010 and the candidates together for the first time showed the press. They were invited to a rehearsal "Viennese Ball in Moscow|Eighth Viennese Ball in Moscow", which will be 24 April 2010 and Old Guest House|Living Dvore. Classes were held under the leadership of President «Russian Dance Union» Stanislav Popov. He said the winner of Miss Russia 2010 "will open the Viennese Ball, as it is not excluded that there will be a few more members chosen from among the finalists. Also one of the organizers of the contest, Vera Krasova reported that This year was made the new crown for the winner: This year we have a new crown, is the crown made jewelry house "JT" and it's made in a similar vein, that is, she repeats the silhouettes of the last crown, but differs in texture, the appearance and value. It will have more diamonds, it will look more beautiful.

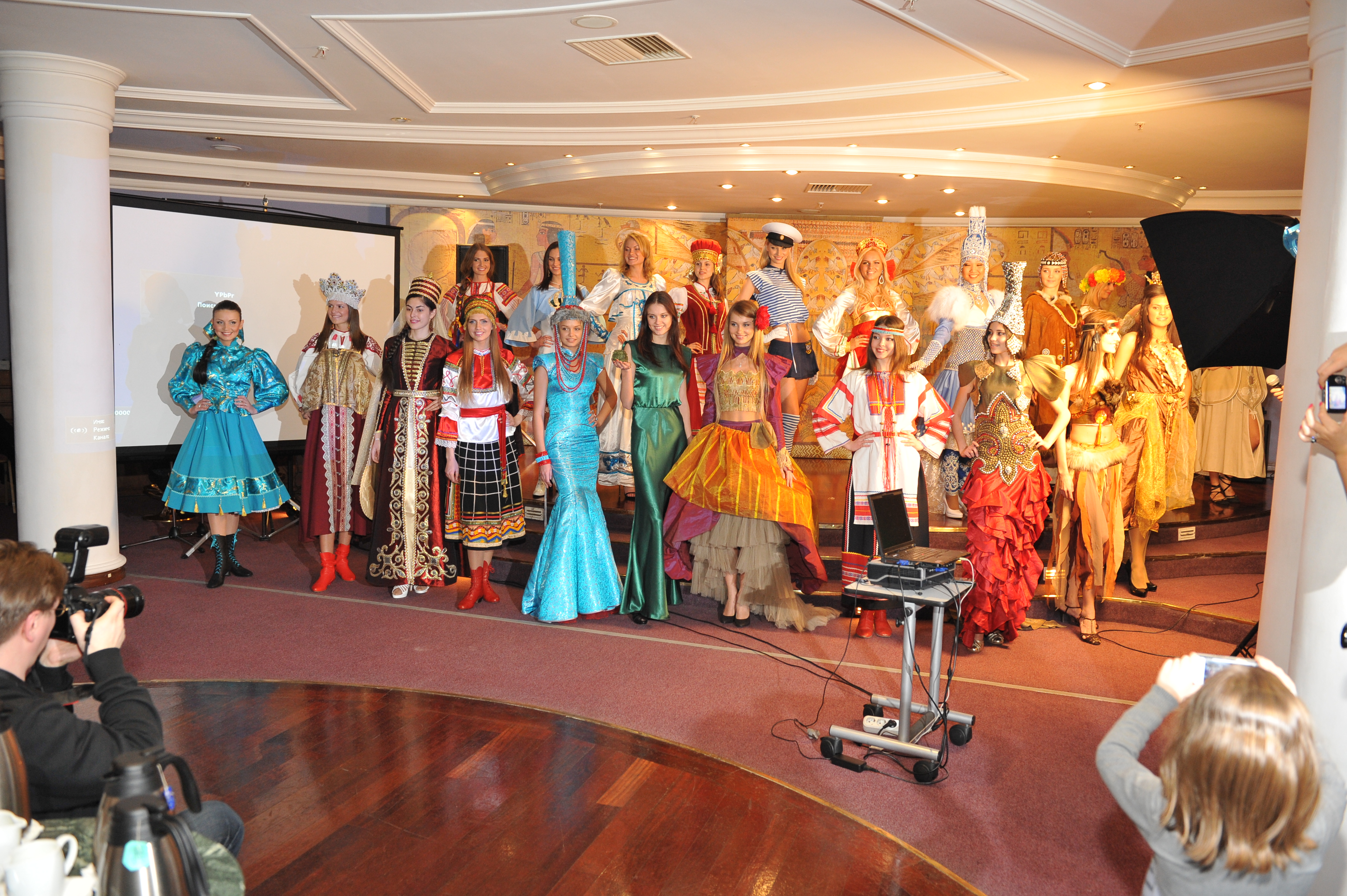
21 February 2010. Miss Russia 2010. Intermediate stage. Competition "National Costume"

15 February 2010 and pretender skated in the shopping center "MEGA Belaya Dacha". The girls were dressed in specially designed costumes for the contest, with the symbols of "Miss Russia" white, blue and red colors. After skiing finalists painted toys in the center of creativity and development. The resulting toys were given to children who were treated in the Research Center of Cardiovascular Surgery. Bakulev|Scientific Center of Cardiovascular Surgery. Bakulev RAMS »

21 February 2010 and in the Imperial Park Hotel & SPA»was a contest" Talents "and competition" National Costume "In addition, this year's first contest took place on" Beauty in the name of philanthropy, in which the girls talked about charity projects, ideas and aspirations that they plan to implement, obtaining the title of Miss Russia 2010 ". To support the finalists before the final ceremony came "Miss Russia 2009 Sofia Rudieva, Miss Russia 2005 Alexandra Ivanovskaya, "Vice-Miss Russia 2007 and Vice-Miss Universe 2008, Vera Krasova, finalist of the Miss Russia 2009 "Olga Zhuk, also known as German designer Philipp Plein. During the press conference, Philip Plain said that at the final ceremony will be held fashion shows in his new collection.

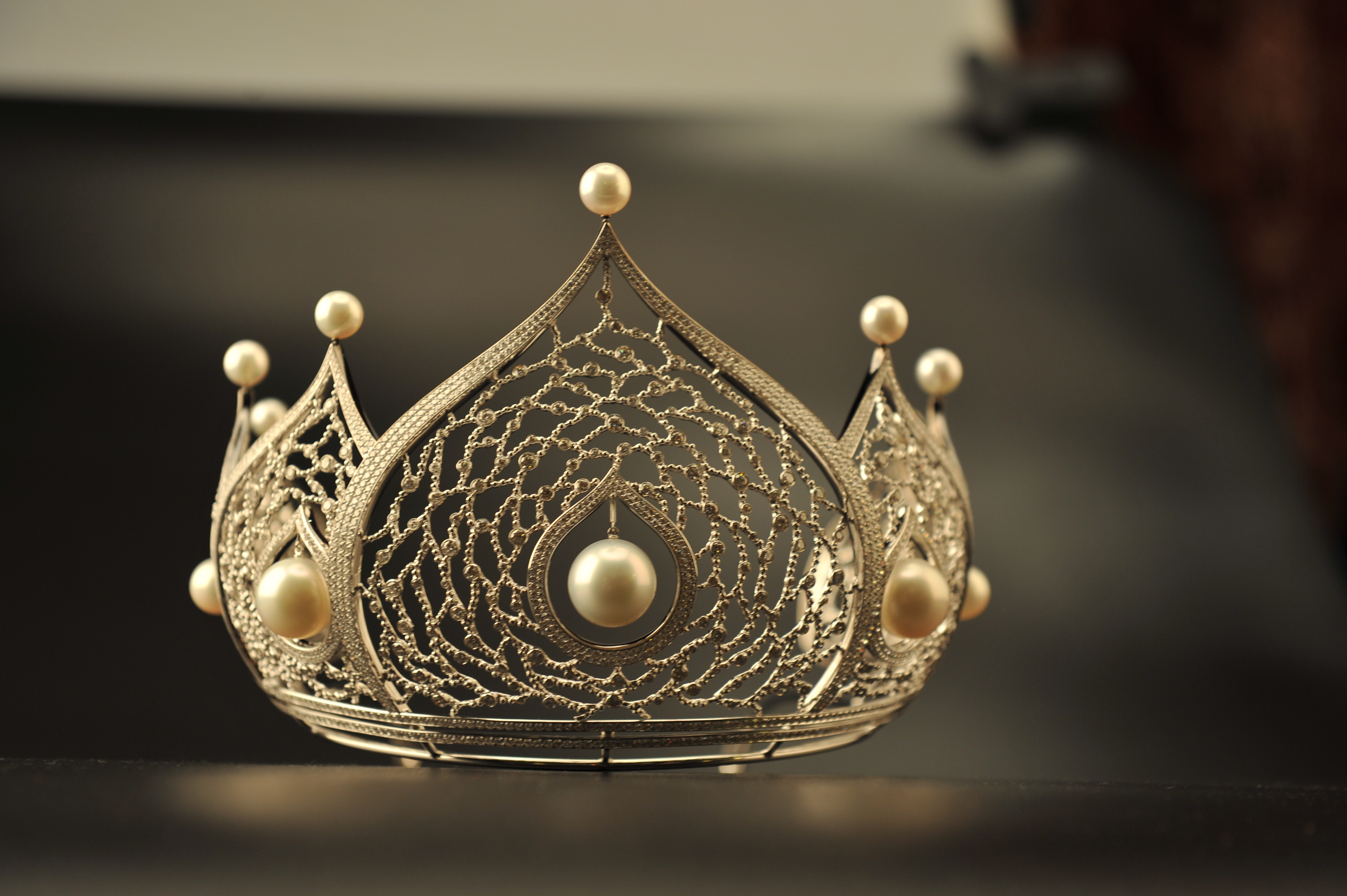
The new crown for the winner of the contest "Miss Russia 2010"

2 March 2010 and in theImperial Park Hotels & SPA»a presentation of a new crown made jewelry house Jewellery Theatre. The crown is made of white gold, 750 carats at its decoration took 2,358 diamonds weighing 62 carats, 14 jewel, the diameter of the largest of whom is 19 mm.- Presentation of the new Crown National Competition "Miss Russia" Decoration estimated at one million dollars. In its manufacturer for jewelers took about three months. The creators assure that the new crown, unlike the predecessor of the corona is much more convenient and easier to order – weighs only a pound. In this regard, Miss Russia 2009 Sofia Rudyeva stated the following: To crown that was on me, it was impossible to wear, it is constantly falling, or dug so that the head and then all day sick. Besides, it was from some heavy metal, and all events at which I was supposed to attend it, became a torture. I am even a little jealous of the new winner. But I will try on the crown before the final.

== Final ==
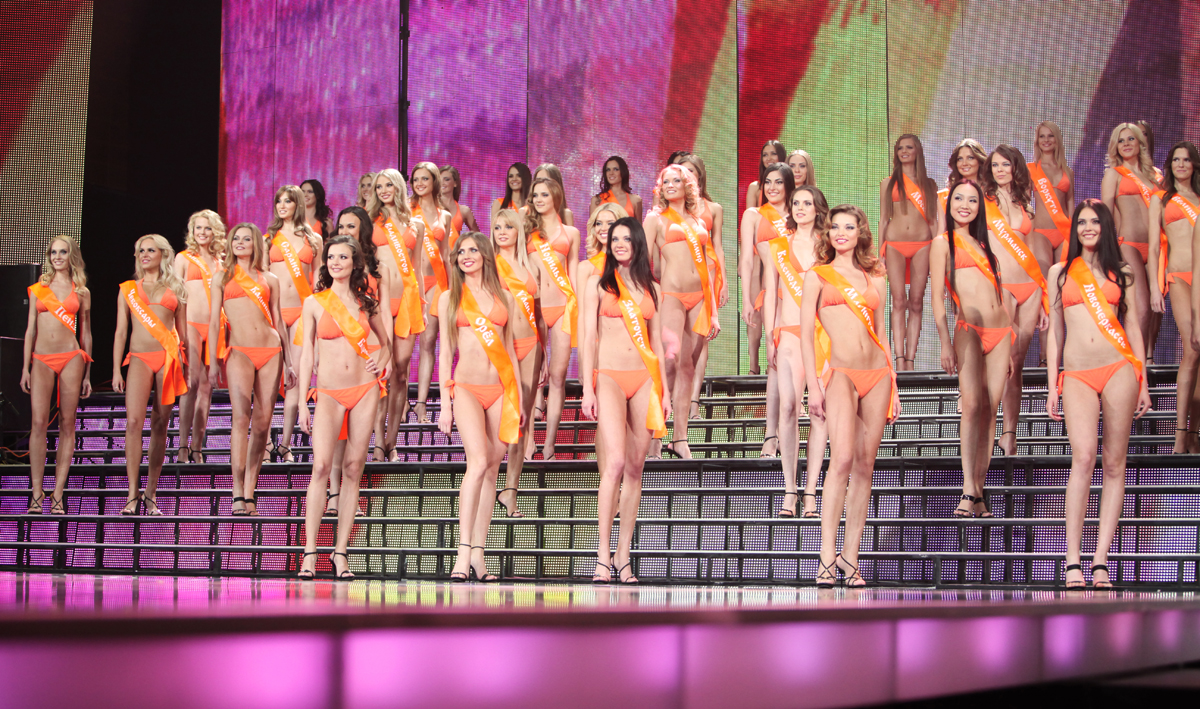
The final ceremony of the contest "Miss Russia 2010"

6 March 2010 and hosted the final of Miss Russia 2010. The award ceremony was led presenter Garik Martirosyan and singer Alsou. After the traditional presentation contest on the stage made saxophonist Igor Butman. In addition, this evening for the guests spoke of "Band'Eros", "Mummy Troll", and singer Philip and singer Zhanna Friske. Distinguished guests were Miss World 2008 Ksenia Sukhinova, Miss Russia 2009 Sofia Rudieva and Miss Universe 2009 Stefanía Fernández.

After the first stage of the competition where the girls were dressed in bathing suits, were chosen the top 15 contestants, who in the second stage came in dresses young designers. In addition, the yield was in evening dress, traditionally provided by a fashion designer Valentin Yudashkin. The final test for the contestants, there was intellectual contest: each of the participants were asked, and the jury assessed a sense of humor and knowledge of participants.

The winner of Miss Russia 2010 "became the model of Yekaterinburg Irina Antonenko, except the title and the crown she received 100 thousand dollars and the right to represent Russia at the forthcoming contest" Miss Universe 2010 and Miss World 2010».

Represent	Candidate	Age	Height
Anapa	Catherine Makovoz	19	1.76 m (5 ft 9 1/2 in)
Astrakhan Oblast	Elena Martynuk	20	1.77 m (5 ft 9 1/2 in)
Barnaul	Elena Masyukova	23	1.77 m (5 ft 9 1/2 in)
Capital City	Maria Lavrova	20	1.73 m (5 ft 8 in)
Cheboksary	Anna Ivanova	19	1.75 m (5 ft 9 in)
Chelyabinsk Oblast	Olga Kononenko	18	1.77 m (5 ft 9 1/2 in)
Frolovo	Alain Samarin	18	1.75 m (5 ft 9 in)
Irkutsk City	Christina Lyzhenkova	21	1.77 m (5 ft 9 1/2 in)
Irkutsk Oblast	MariaOvechkin	19	1.79 m (5 ft 10 1/2 in)
Ivanovo Oblast	Daria Belova	18	1.75 m (5 ft 9 in)
Kaliningrad Oblast	Anastasia Stitch	20	1.76 m (5 ft 9 1/2 in)
Komsomolsk-on-Amur	Olga Nikolaeva	19	1.78 m (5 ft 10 in)
Krasnoyarsk Krai	Ekaterina Maximova	18	1.76 m (5 ft 9 1/2 in)
Krasnoyarsk City	Aliyev Elnar	18	1.76 m (5 ft 9 1/2 in)
Krasnoyarsk Krai	Svetlana Kolesnikova	22	1.79 m (5 ft 10 1/2 in)
Magnitogorsk	Anastasia Creek	23	1.81 m (5 ft 11 1/2 in)
Moscow Oblast	Valeria Yakushkina	19	1.77 m (5 ft 9 1/2 in)
Murmansk Oblast	Xenia Polyanskaya	20	1.82 m (5 ft 11 1/2 in)
Nalchik	Zalina Chechenova	19	1.80 m (5 ft 11 in)
Nizhny Novgorod City	Angelina Alhovik	20	1.76 m (5 ft 9 1/2 in)
Norilsk	Maria Dementieva	19	1.80 m (5 ft 11 in)
Novocherkassk	Catherine Aleshkina	18	1.78 m (5 ft 10 in)
Novokuznetsk	Yana Vologda	18	1.79 m (5 ft 10 1/2 in)
Novosibirsk Oblast	Arina Olvanik	20	1.77 m (5 ft 9 1/2 in)
Omsk City	Valeria Blikova	22	1.73 m (5 ft 8 in)
Orel Oblast	Anna Azarov	22	1.78 m (5 ft 10 in)
Orenburg Oblast	Alla Korkin	21	1.76 m (5 ft 9 1/2 in)
Penza Oblast	Valeria Shkalova	20	1.75 m (5 ft 9 in)
Perm City	Julia Sukrusheva	18	1.77 m (5 ft 9 1/2 in)
Rostov-on-Don	Svetlana Simonova	22	1.75 m (5 ft 9 in)
Saint Petersburg	Alain Muromtseva	21	1.82 m (5 ft 11 1/2 in)
Samara City	Alina Solovyov	19	1.75 m (5 ft 9 in)
Samara Oblast	Irina Alekseeva	22	1.75 m (5 ft 9 in)
Saransk	Xenia Romanova	18	1.80 m (5 ft 11 in)
Smolensk Oblast	Anna Korobkova	18	1.80 m (5 ft 11 in)
Surgut	Faith Mayorov	19	1.78 m (5 ft 10 in)
Tambov Oblast	Anastasia Tolmachev	20	1.75 m (5 ft 9 in)
Tatarstan Republic	Irina Sharipova	18	1.78 m (5 ft 10 in)
Togliatti	Ekaterina Usov	20	1.78 m (5 ft 10 in)
Tver Oblast	Evgenia Guseva	20	1.78 m (5 ft 10 in)
Tyumen Oblast	Irina Vasilieva	20	1.78 m (5 ft 10 in)
Ulan-Ude	Maya Smirnova	18	1.74 m (5 ft 8 1/2 in)
Veliky Novgorod	Olga Kotin	21	1.84 m (6 ft 1/2 in)
Vladimir Oblast	Anna Bogdanova	19	1.81 m (5 ft 11 1/2 in)
Vladivostok	Tamara Zhukova	20	1.85 m (6 ft 1 in)
Volgograd Oblast	Valentina Sobolev	20	1.77 m (5 ft 9 1/2 in)
Vorkuta	Victoria Bogoslavtseva	19	1.76 m (5 ft 9 1/2 in)
Yakutsk	Lana Smetanina	20	1.74 m (5 ft 8 1/2 in)
Yekaterinburg	Irina Antonenko	18	1.78 m (5 ft 10 in)
Yuzhno-Sakhalinsk	Alain Moskalik	22	1.78 m (5 ft 10 in)
Zlatoust	Olga Nazarova	20	1.82 m (5 ft 11 1/2 in)
