= Miss France 2009 =

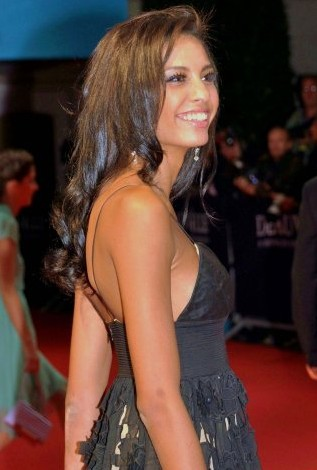
- Chloé Mortaud
- Date: December 6, 2008
- Presenters: Geneviève de Fontenay, Jean-Pierre Foucault, Sylvie Tellier and Yves Derisbourg
- Venue: Puy du Fou, Pays de la Loire
- Broadcaster: TF1
- Entrants: 36
- Placements: 12
- Debuts: Miss Albigeois Midi-Pyrénées; Miss St. Pierre & Miquelon
- Withdrawals: Miss Albigeois Midi-Toulousain; Miss Comminges-Pyrénées
- Winner: Chloé Mortaud; Albigeois Midi-Pyrénées
- Congeniality: Éméné Nyamé; Flandre
- Best National Costume: Hinatea Boosie; Tahiti
- Photogenic: Camille Cheyere; Lorraine

Miss France 2009, the 79nd edition of the Miss France pageant, was held in Puy du Fou, Pays de la Loire on December 6, 2008.

It was the first time that the pageant took place in Puy du Fou and the Pays de la Loire region.

The ceremony was held at TF1, and was presented by Jean-Pierre Foucault and the national director Sylvie Tellier.

Chloé Mortaud of Albigeois Midi-Pyrénées was crowned Miss France 2009 by the outgoing title-holder Valérie Bègue of Réunion, Miss France 2008. She represented France at Miss World 2009 where she placed among Top 7 finalists. She also placed in Top 10 in Miss Universe 2009.

== Results ==
=== Placements ===
Placement	Contestant
Miss France 2009	Albigeois Midi-Pyrénées – Chloé Mortaud
1st Runner-Up	Lorraine – Camille Cheyere
2nd Runner-Up	Pays de la Loire – Elodie Martineau
3rd Runner-Up	Mayotte – Esthel Nee
4th Runner-Up	Brittany – Bianca Taillard
Top 12	Poitou-Charentes – Mathilde Muller (5th Runner-Up); Rhône-Alpes – Armonie Jenton (6th Runner-Up); Berry Loire Valley – Aline Moreau; Guadeloupe – Rebecca Erivan; Limousin – Chloé Certoux; Normandy – Johanna Moreau; Réunion Delphine Courteaud

=== Special awards ===
Prize	Contestant
Best National Costume	Tahiti – Hinatea Boosie
Miss Congeniality (voted by contestants)	Flandre – Emene Nyame
Miss Photogenic (voted by press reporters)	Lorraine – Camille Cheyere
Miss Web	New Caledonia – Aurleia Morelli

== Candidates ==
Represented	Contestant	Age	Height	Hometown
Albigeois Midi-Pyrénées	Chloé Mortaud	19	1.80	Bénac
Alsace	Carole Weyrich	22	1.77	Strasbourg
Aquitaine	Anna Nieto	20	1.74	Sarlat la Canéda
Artois Hainaut	Anne Sophie Sevrette	20	1.79	Lens
Auvergne	Mélanie Billiard	22	1.73	Montluçon
Berry Loire Valley	Aline Moreau	19	1.75	Châteauroux
Burgundy	Tiphanie Deschamps	18	1.75	Chagny
Brittany	Bianca Taillard	23	1.76	Châteaubriant
Champagne Ardenne	Émilie Colomb	19	1.72	Reims
Corsica	María Santa Lucchinacci	24	1.77	Ajaccio
Côte d'Azur	Audrey Sans	20	1.75	Cannes
Flandre	Éméné Nyamé	19	1.82	Roubaix
Franche-Comté	Johanne Kervella	23	1.70	Besançon
Guadeloupe	Rebecca Erivan	18	1.83	Basse-Terre
Guyane	Carmen Prince	20	1.72	Remire Montjoly
Île de France	Pauline Righini	20	1.71	Puteaux
Languedoc-Roussillon	Cindy Filipiak	22	1.76	Perpignan
Limousin	Chloé Certoux	18	1.79	Limoges
Loire Forez	Laurienne Perez	20	1.71	Saint Étienne
Lorraine	Camille Cheyere	21	1.79	Thionville
Martinique	Laura Fidi	18	1.77	Fort de France
Mayotte	Esthel Nee	20	1.79	Bandrélé
New Caledonia	Aurelia Morelli	20	1.75	Nouméa
Normandy	Johanna Moreau	24	1.80	Alençon
Orléanais	Maricon Tricot	19	1.75	Chartres
Paris	Sarah Barzyk	19	1.71	Paris
Pays de la Loire	Élodie Martineau	21	1.74	Auzay
Pays de Savoie	Wendy Gex	19	1.79	Annemasse
Picardy	Katy Josse	22	1.70	Saint Quentin
Poitou-Charentes	Mathilde Muller	19	1.76	Poitiers
Provence	Laurie Imber	19	1.72	Martigues
Quercy Rouergue	Sophie Lopez	18	1.75	Figeac
Réunion	Delphine Courteaud	22	1.72	Saint Denis
Rhône-Alpes	Armonie Jenton	18	1.74	Viriat
Saint Pierre and Miquelon	Cathy Sabarots	22	1.70	Saint Pierre
Tahiti	Hinatea Boosie	20	1.70	Nuku Hiva

== Judges ==
Member
Line Renaud (president)	Actress and singer
Anggun	Singer and songwriter
Patrice Leconte	Director
Rachel Legrain-Trapani	Miss France 2007
Benoît Poelvoorde	Actor
Henri-Jean Servat	Journalist
Kenzo Takada	Fashion designer

== Notes about the contestants ==
- Miss Albigeois Midi-Pyrenees, Chloé Mortaud, is American.
- Miss Brittany, Bianca Taillard, has got Malagasy origins.
- Miss Flandre, Éméné Nyamé, has got Algerian and Cameroonian origins.
- Miss Languedoc-Roussillon, Cindy Filipiak, has many titles : 1st runner-up of Miss Montpellier 2006, 2nd runner-up of Miss Canton of Pigan, 1st runner-up of Miss Hérault 2006, Miss Perolls 2007 and Miss Hérault 2007.
- Miss Martinique, Laura Fidi, has got Senegalese origins.
- Miss New Caledonia, Aurélia Morelli, has got Corsican, Arabic, Tahitian and Japanese origins.
- Miss Paris, Sarah Barzyk, is the daughter of Patricia Barzyk, Miss France 1980 and 1st runner-up of Miss World 1980.
- Miss Franche-Comté, Johanne Kervella, given favorite for this election is not among the 12 semifinalists because it was not the regulatory size (1.70M)

== Notes about the placements ==
- Albigeois Midi-Pyrénées wins for the first time ever the Miss France pageant.
- Réunion is placed for five consecutive year.
- Pays de Loire and Rhône-Alpes is placed for third consecutive year.
- Guadeloupe is placed for second consecutive year.
- Poitou-Charentes is placed for the first time since the Miss France 1998 pageant.
- Mayotte is placed for the first time since the Miss France 2002 pageant.
- Brittany is placed for the first time since the Miss France 2004 pageant.
- Normandy and Lorraine are placed for the first time since the Miss France 2005 pageant.
- Berry Loire Valley and Limousin are placed for the first time since the Miss France 2007 pageant.
- First qualification of Albigeois Midi-Pyrénées for her first participation.

== Crossovers ==
Contestants who previously competed or will be competing at international beauty pageants:

Miss Universe

- 2009: Albigeois Midi-Pyrénées - Chloé Mortaud (Top 10)
  - (Nassau, Bahamas)

Miss Model of the World

- 2009: Flandre - Éméné Nyamé (Winner)
  - (Shenzhen, China)

Miss International

- 2009: Poitou Charentes - Mathilde Muller
  - (Chengdu, China)

Miss World

- 2009: Albigeois Midi-Pyrénées - Chloé Mortaud (3rd Runner-up)
  - (Johannesburg, South Africa)
