= Miss France 2008 =

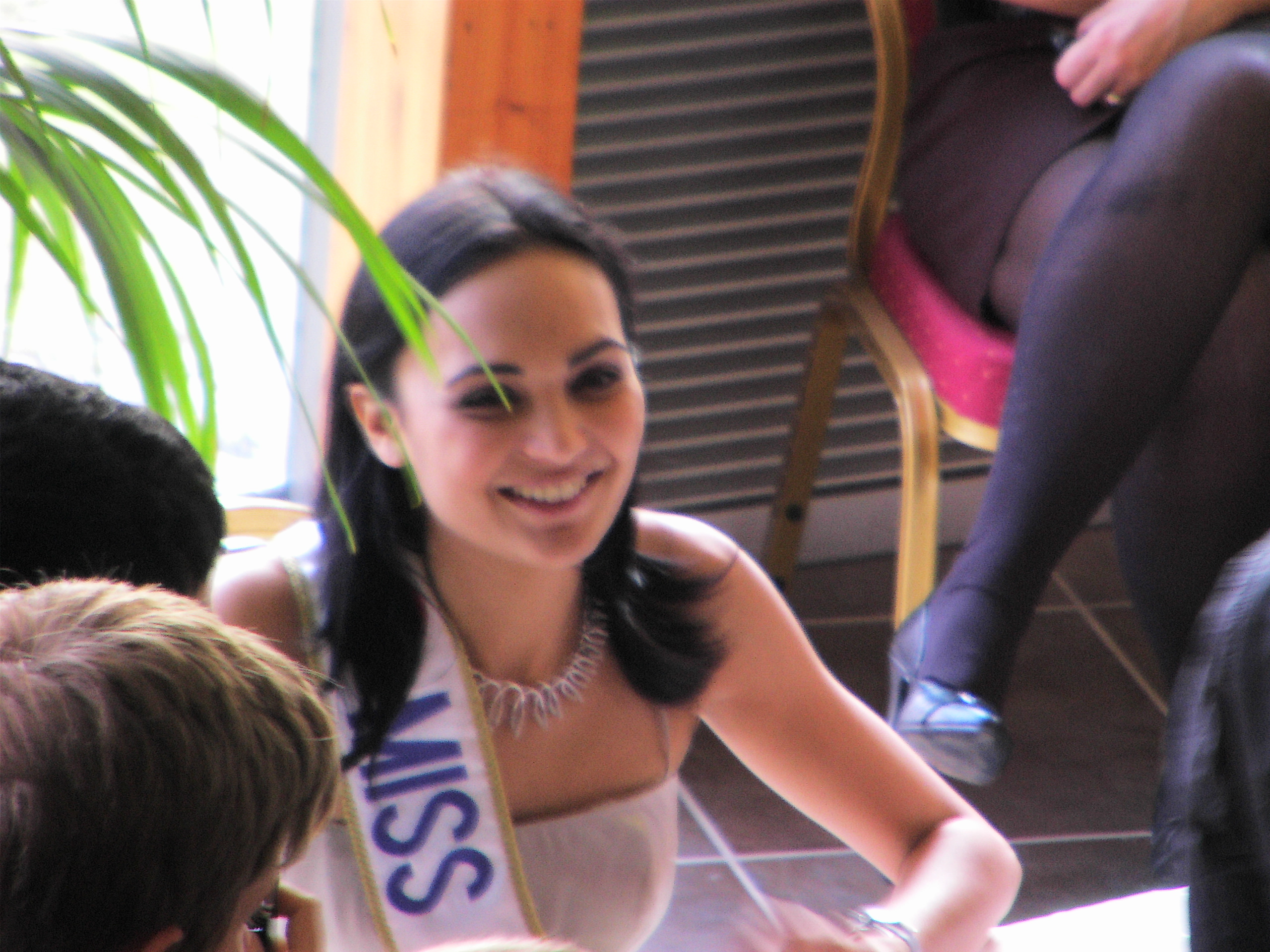
- Valérie Bègue
- Date: December 8, 2007
- Presenters: Jean-Pierre Foucault, Geneviève de Fontenay and Yves Derisbourg
- Entertainment: Patrick Bruel
- Venue: Dunkirk Convention Center, Dunkirk, Nord-Pas-de-Calais
- Broadcaster: TF1
- Entrants: 36
- Placements: 12
- Debuts: Miss New Caledonia
- Withdrawals: Miss Caledonia, Miss Dauphiné, Miss Gascony, Miss Languedoc
- Returns: Miss Languedoc-Roussillon, Miss Loire Forez
- Winner: Valérie Bègue; Réunion

Miss France 2008 was the 78th edition of the Miss France pageant, held in Dunkirk, Nord-Pas-de-Calais, on December 8, 2007.

The ceremony was held at TF1, and was presented by Jean-Pierre Foucault and the Miss France Committee President Geneviève de Fontenay.

Valérie Bègue of Réunion was crowned Miss France 2008 by the outgoing title-holder Rachel Legrain-Trapani of Picardy, Miss France 2007. Bègue was originally supposed to represent France at Miss World 2008 and Miss Universe 2008, but she was replaced by 2nd Runner-Up, Laura Tanguy of Pays de Loire after suggestive photos of Bègue were released to the public and Bègue refused to resign. A compromise was reached that allowed her to keep the title of Miss France 2008 but she was barred from crowning her successor the following year and was stripped of her right to represent France at any international beauty pageant.

== Results ==
Placement	Contestant
Miss France 2008	Réunion – Valérie Bègue
1st Runner-Up	New Caledonia – Vahinerii Requillart
2nd Runner-Up	Pays de la Loire – Laura Tanguy
3rd Runner-Up	Burgundy – Vicky Michaud
4th Runner-Up	Côte d'Azur – Azémina Hot
Top 12	Rhône-Alpes – Cloé Biessy (5th Runner-Up); Alsace – Florima Treiber (6th Runner-Up); Albigeois Midi-Toulousain – Eurydice Rigal; Auvergne – Emmanuelle Lemery; Guadeloupe – Mandy Falla; Guyane – Mandy Nicolas; Paris – Cyrielle Roidot

== Contestants ==
Represented	Contestant	Age	Height	Hometown
Albigeois Midi-Toulousain	Eurydice Rigal	20	1.80 m (5 ft 11 in)	Saint-Lieux-lès-Lavaur
Alsace	Florima Treiber	20	1.80 m (5 ft 11 in)	Colmar
Aquitaine	Caroline Martin	20	1.72 m (5 ft 7 1/2 in)	Pau
Artois-Hainaut	Alexandra Chiacchia	20	1.80 m (5 ft 11 in)	Rombies-et-Marchipont
Auvergne	Emmanuelle Lemery	19	1.81 m (5 ft 11 1/2 in)	Clermont-Ferrand
Berry-Loire Valley	Aurélie Birbaud	20	1.81 m (5 ft 11 1/2 in)	Salbris
Bourgogne	Vicky Michaud	20	1.72 m (5 ft 7 1/2 in)	Bourbon-Lancy
Brittany	Eglantine Morin	19	1.77 m (5 ft 9 1/2 in)	Savenay
Champagne-Ardenne	Deborah Lopez	19	1.77 m (5 ft 9 1/2 in)	
Comminges-Pyrénées	Sandra Laporte	19	1.74 m (5 ft 8 1/2 in)	Labarthe-Rivière
Corsica	Vanessa Mangavel	21	1.80 m (5 ft 11 in)	Ajaccio
Côte d'Azur	Azémina Hot	23	1.80 m (5 ft 11 in)	Nice
Flandre	Elise Logie	22	1.75 m (5 ft 9 in)	Le Quesnoy
Franche-Comté	Laure Amourette	23	1.72 m (5 ft 7 1/2 in)	Laviron
Guadeloupe	Mandy Falla	18	1.76 m (5 ft 9 1/2 in)	Les Abymes
Guyane	Mandy Nicolas	18	1.82 m (5 ft 11 1/2 in)	Kourou
Île de France	Sarah Gernier	20	1.75 m (5 ft 9 in)	Nanterre
Languedoc-Roussillon	Florence d'Odorico	21	1.82 m (5 ft 11 1/2 in)	Nîmes
Limousin	Charlotte Brissaud	21	1.78 m (5 ft 10 in)	
Loire Forez	Laura Varillon	18	1.78 m (5 ft 10 in)	Saint-Chamond
Lorraine	Aurélie Charlier	21	1.74 m (5 ft 8 1/2 in)	Homécourt
Martinique	Bianca Careto	19	1.70 m (5 ft 7 in)	Schœlcher
Mayotte	Nasma Choudjaidine	18	1.80 m (5 ft 11 in)	Bègles
New Caledonia	Vahinerii Requillart	19	1.75 m (5 ft 9 in)	
Normandy	Séverine Daniel	20	1.72 m (5 ft 7 1/2 in)	Chèvreville
Orléanais	Sandrine Midon	18	1.72 m (5 ft 7 1/2 in)	
Paris	Cyrielle Roidot	24	1.75 m (5 ft 9 in)	Paris
Pays de Loire	Laura Tanguy	20	1.79 m (5 ft 10 1/2 in)	Écouflant
Pays de Savoie	Sonia Guillet	24	1.77 m (5 ft 9 1/2 in)	Cruet
Picardy	Julie Tristan	22	1.76 m (5 ft 9 1/2 in)	Compiègne
Poitou-Charentes	Clémence Dussagne	19	1.72 m (5 ft 7 1/2 in)	Dignac
Provence	Angélique Donat	23	1.78 m (5 ft 10 in)	La Garde
Quercy-Rouergue	Kelly Remus	20	1.77 m (5 ft 9 1/2 in)	Millau
Réunion	Valérie Bègue	22	1.74 m (5 ft 8 1/2 in)	Saint-Leu
Rhône-Alpes	Cloé Biessy	19	1.74 m (5 ft 8 1/2 in)	Prévessin
Tahiti	Taoahere Richmond	22	1.73 m (5 ft 8 in)	Pirae

== Crossovers ==
Contestants who previously competed or will be competing at international beauty pageants:

Miss Universe

- 2008: Pays de Loire - Laura Tanguy
  - (Nha Trang, Vietnam)

Miss World

- 2008: Pays de Loire - Laura Tanguy
  - (Johannesburg, South Africa)

Miss International

- 2008: Bourgogne - Vicky Michaud
  - (Macau, Macau)
- 2010: Alsace - Florima Treiber (Top 15)
  - (Chengdu, China)

Miss Model of the World

- 2008: Auvergne - Emmanuelle Lemery
  - (Buenos Aires, Argentina)
- 2010: Albigeois Midi-Toulousain - Eurydice Rigal (6th Runner-up)
  - (Shenzhen, China)

Miss Asia Pacific World

- 2011: Alsace - Florima Treiber
  - (Viña Del Mar, Chile)
