= Cinq =

Cinq is French for 'five', and may refer to:

- CINQ-FM, a multilingual Canadian radio station located in Montreal, Quebec
- Cinq Music Group, an American music distribution, record label, and rights management company
- La Cinq, a French free-to-air television network
- Le Cinq, a gourmet restaurant in Paris, France
- Cinq (playing card), obscure name for a playing card having the number five

== See also ==
- Cinco (disambiguation)
- Cink, an abandoned settlement in southern Slovenia
- Cinque (disambiguation)
- Numéro Cinq, a former online international journal of arts and letters
- Park Cinq, a luxury cooperative apartment building in Manhattan, New York
