= Quinque =

Quinque may refer to:

- Quinque-, a number prefix meaning 5 in English
- Quinque, Virginia, an unincorporated community in Greene County, United States

and also:

- Quinque viae, five arguments regarding the existence of God summarized by the 13th-century Roman Catholic philosopher and theologian St. Thomas Aquinas

== See also ==
- Cinque (disambiguation), an Italian word that carries the meaning of "five"
