= Claudia Ferraris =

Italian model

- Born: Claudia Ferraris; 5 October 1988 (age 38); Bergamo; Lombardia, Italy
- Height: 5 ft 8 in (1.73 m)
- Beauty pageant titleholder
- Title: Miss Lombardia 2006; Miss Universo Italia 2008
- Hair color: Brown
- Eye color: Green
- Major competitions: • Miss Italia 2006 (Top 10) • Miss Universo Italia 2008 (winner) • Miss Universe 2008 (Top 10)

Claudia Ferraris (born 5 October 1988 in Bergamo, Lombardia, Italy) is an Italian model and beauty pageant titleholder who the winner of the Miss Universo Italia 2008 pageant that was held at the Palazzo dei Congressi in Riccione, Emilia-Romagna on 31 May 2008. She represented Italy at the Miss Universe 2008 pageant in Nha Trang, Vietnam on 14 July. She placed in the top 10, ranking 9th at the end of the competition. In 2006, she had entered the Miss Italia pageant as Miss Lombardia and had placed among the top 10 there as well.

Claudia's scores were 7.671 in the swimsuit competition (10th) and 7.729 in the evening gown competition (9th and her final official placement). During the stay in Vietnam for the pageant, Claudia and Miss Venezuela Dayana Mendoza were roommates and became close friends. After Mendoza's win, Claudia was invited to Caracas, Venezuela and appeared on television along with Mendoza herself during Sabado Sensacional on the Venevision channel as part of a show celebrating Mendoza's victory.

Claudia is 5 ft 8 in (1.73 m) and her zodiac sign is a Libra. Her hobbies include speaking English, music, dancing, reading, volleyball and working out. Her dream is to someday become the editor of a fashion magazine.
