= Cinque =

Cinque is Italian for five, and may refer to:

== Places ==
- Cinque Ports, five English ports making up the Confederation of the Cinque Ports
- Cinque Terre, five coastal villages in the province of La Spezia in Italy
- Cinque Island, an island in the Andaman archipelago, India

== Organizations ==
- The Cinque Gallery, defunct NYC fine arts gallery, known for its cultivation of Black and marginalized artists

== People ==
- Joseph Cinqué (c. 1814–c. 1879), leader of the La Amistad slave revolt
- Cinque Mtume or Donald DeFreeze (1943–1974), leader of the Symbionese Liberation Army
- Flaminia Cinque, English actress (born 1964)
- Joe Cinque, Australian murder victim
- Guglielmo Cinque, linguist
- Ruchell "Cinque" Magee, participant in the 1970 Marin County Civic Center attacks who spent decades in prison
- Cinqué Lee, American actress

=== Characters ===
- Cinque Nakajima, in the Magical Girl Lyrical Nanoha series
- Cinque Izumi, in the Japanese TV series Dog Days

== See also ==
- Cinq (disambiguation), French for five
- Cinco (disambiguation)
- Cinquecento, the Renaissance in literature and art in the sixteenth century
- Fiat Cinquecento, a model of car
- Sink (disambiguation)
