= Laura Tanguy =

French beauty pageant contestant

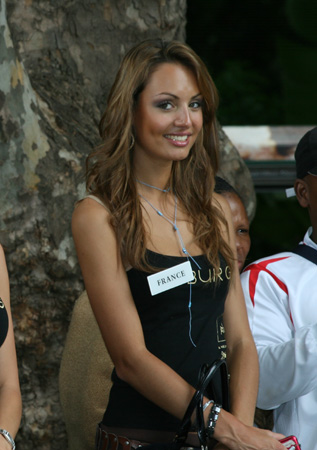
- Born: Laura Tanguy; 2 August 1987 (age 39)
- Beauty pageant titleholder
- Title: Miss France 2008
- Major competitions: Miss France 2008 (2nd Runner up); Miss Universe 2008 (Did not place); Miss World 2008 (Did not place)

Laura Tanguy (born 2 August 1987 in Angers) is a French model and beauty pageant titleholder who was awarded second runner-up of Miss France 2008, having lost to Valérie Bègue in the official scoring. She also competed for the regional preliminary qualifiers for Miss France 2009, and campaigned to represent France at the Miss World and Miss Universe competitions, wishing to recall Valérie Bègue, after suggestive photos were leaked in a magazine two weeks after her coronation.

== Biography ==
Tanguy is the daughter of an engineer and a laboratory assistant in physics and chemistry. She fluently speaks both French and English, having lived in San Antonio up until her adolescence. During her time in France, Tanguy has lived in Écouflant, a town near Angers. She holds an Economic and Social Baccalaureate (Bac d'ES)^{[fr]} (the equivalent of a US high school diploma), and is currently studying at the School of Nursing of Angers.

Tanguy is 5'10" and has green eyes.

== Awards ==
- French representative to Miss Universe 2008
- French representative to Miss World 2008
- New Miss France 2008
- Original 2nd runner-up of Miss France 2008
- Miss Pays de Loire 2007 (representing Cholet)
- Miss Maine-et-Loire 2006
- Miss Chrono des Herbiers 2005
- Finalist at the Elite Model Look 2003 (representing La Baule).

== Representative as Miss France 2008 ==
Following the controversy which arose on 21 December 2007, triggered by the publication of private photos of Valérie Bègue in the magazine Entrevue^{[fr]}, somewhat doubtful of the newly elected Miss France, chairwoman of Miss France Committee, Geneviève de Fontenay, called for the resignation and dismissal of Bègue, two weeks after her reign as Miss France 2008.

After an agreement, Bègue was able to retain her title, but it was adjudicated that she will not participate in any future Miss France contest, Miss Universe 2008, nor any contest in the presence of Geneviève de Fontenay.

On 6 January 2008, the President of the Miss France committee proclaimed Laura Tanguy, second runner-up at Miss France 2008, as the successor of the title, alongside a mandate to represent France in the higher levels of the Miss World and Miss Universe pageants, and to accompany Geneviève de Fontenay to other regional elections (first runner-up, Miss New Caledonia, did not wish to hold the post for reasons relating to her studies).

Awards and achievements
Preceded by (Picardy) Rachel Legrain-Trapani	Miss Universe France; 2008	Succeeded by (Midi-Pyrénées) Chloé Mortaud
Preceded by (Picardy) Rachel Legrain-Trapani	Miss World France; 2008	Succeeded by (Midi-Pyrénées) Chloé Mortaud
Preceded by (Réunion) Raïssa Boyer	Miss France 2nd Runner-Up; 2008	Succeeded by (Pays de la Loire) Élodie Martineau
Preceded by Christine Rambaud	Miss Pays de Loire; 2007	Succeeded by Élodie Martineau
