= Chloé Mortaud =

French model and beauty pageant titleholder

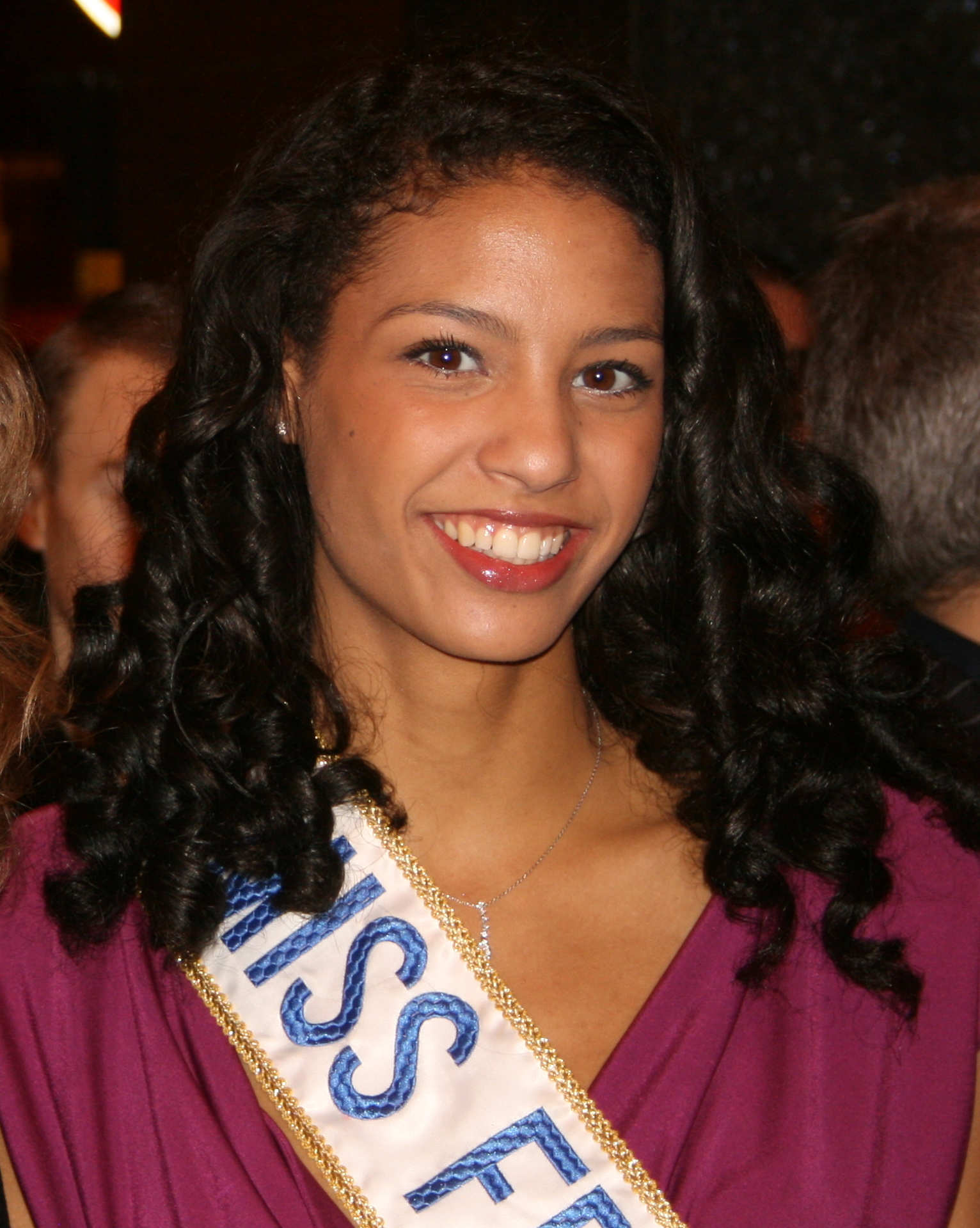
- Mortaud as Miss France 2009
- Born: 19 September 1989 (age 37); Lisieux, France
- Height: 5 ft 11 in (1.80 m)
- Beauty pageant titleholder
- Title: Miss Albigeois Midi-Pyrénées 2008; Miss France 2009
- Hair color: Black
- Eye color: Brown
- Major competitions: Miss France 2009 (Winner); Miss Universe 2009 (Top 10); Miss World 2009 (Top 7)
- Website: www.chloekingmortaud.com

Chloé Mortaud (born 19 September 1989) is a French model and beauty pageant titleholder who was crowned Miss France 2009. She had previously been crowned Miss Albigeois Midi-Pyrénées 2008, becoming the first and only woman from Midi-Pyrénées to be crowned Miss France.

== Early life and education ==
Mortaud was born in Lisieux in the Calvados department to a French father from Poitou-Charentes and an African-American mother from Mississippi, who had emigrated from the United States to France. Her father worked as an agriculture advisor for the Chamber of Agriculture, while her mother was a temp English language instructor at the Chamber of Commerce and Industry. She additionally has a younger brother.

Mortaud spent her early life in Eure, Burgundy, and Vienne, before settling with her family in the town of Bénac in the Ariège department at age 10. Mortaud was educated in the nearby towns of Serres-sur-Arget and Foix, and was studying for a brevet de technicien supérieur (BTS) diploma in international trade in Toulouse, at the time of beginning her career in pageantry.

== Miss Universe 2009 ==
Mortaud represented France at the Miss Universe 2009 pageant and finished in 6th place overall barely missing the top 5 by a mere one-fifth of a point (0.219). This pageant was won by Venezuelan Stefanía Fernández.

== Miss World 2009 ==
Mortaud became a finalist at Miss World 2009 (3rd runner-up) finals on 12 December 2009. She also placed 3rd runner up at the Miss World Beach Beauty competition and placed among the top 12 in the Miss World Top Model competition. Out of seven delegates who competed at Miss Universe 2009 and Miss World 2009, only Chloé and Miss South Africa Tatum Keshwar made the finals in both pageants.

== After Miss France ==
In 2017, Chloé joined journalist Christophe Roux as the French commentators for Miss Universe 2016 in the Philippines, which aired live in France on Paris Première. She became overly emotional when French hopeful Iris Mittenaere was crowned the winner.

Awards and achievements
Preceded by (Pays de la Loire) Laura Tanguy	Miss Universe France; 2009	Succeeded by (Normandy) Malika Ménard
Preceded by (Pays de la Loire) Laura Tanguy	Miss World France; 2009	Succeeded by (Rhône-Alpes) Virginie Dechenaud
Preceded by (Réunion) Valérie Bègue	Miss France; 2009	Succeeded by (Normandy) Malika Ménard
Preceded by Eurydice Rigal	Miss Albigeois - Midi-Pyrénées; 2008	Succeeded by Laura Faroult
