= Levy Li =

Malaysian Chinese model

Levy Li Su Lin
- Born: 20 October 1987 (age 37); Terengganu, Malaysia
- Website: levyli.com/blog/ www.missuniverse.com

Levy Li

Chinese name
- Traditional Chinese: 李素琳
- Simplified Chinese: 李素琳
- Hanyu Pinyin: Lǐ Sùlín
- Jyutping: Lei5 Sou3 Lam4
- Hokkien POJ: Lí Sò͘-lîm
- Tâi-lô: Lí Sòo-lîm

Levy Li Su Lin (Li (李)素琳) (born 20 October 1987) is a Malaysian Chinese model and beauty pageant titleholder who the winner of Miss Malaysia Universe 2008 and represented Malaysia in the Miss Universe 2008 beauty pageant held in Vietnam. Levy is a student, model, spokesperson and entrepreneur.

Levy started off her career as a professional model and spokesperson after winning the Miss Malaysia Universe title which was her first participation in a beauty pageant. Levy is actively involved with Malaysia International Fashion Week, Stylo, and MODA.

In 2008, Levy was appointed as Wacoal Malaysia ambassador and in 2009, Levy was appointed as Shiseido Malaysia ambassador.
