= Claudia Moro =

Spanish model and beauty pageant winner (born 1985)

- Born: Claudia Moro Fernández; November 10, 1985 (age 40); Santiago de Compostela, Spain
- Height: 1.75 m (5 ft 9 in)
- Beauty pageant titleholder
- Title: Miss Madrid 2007; Miss España Universo 2008
- Hair color: Brown
- Eye color: Brown
- Major competitions: Miss Spain 2008 (1st Runner-Up) (Miss España Universo); Miss Universe 2008 (Top 10)

Claudia Moro Fernández (born November 10, 1985, in Santiago de Compostela) is a Spanish model and beauty pageant titleholder who competed in the 2008 Miss Universe pageant, placing seventh overall.

== Miss Spain ==
She represented Madrid at Miss Spain 2008 and placed first runner-up to Patricia Yurena Rodríguez.

== Miss Universe ==
Moro was sent to Miss Universe 2008 due to Rodríguez being underage and finished in the Top 10 (7th overall).

Awards and achievements
Preceded by Natalia Zabala	Miss España Universo; 2008	Succeeded by Estíbaliz Pereira
