= Gasoline Alley (2022 film) =

2022 American film by Edward John Drake

- Official release poster
- Directed by: Edward John Drake
- Written by: Tom Sierchio; Edward John Drake
- Produced by: Corey William Large; Tom Sierchio
- Starring: Devon Sawa; Bruce Willis; Luke Wilson
- Cinematography: Brandon Lee Cox
- Edited by: Justin Williams
- Music by: Scott Currie
- Production company: 308 Ent
- Distributed by: Saban Films
- Release date: February 25, 2022
- Running time: 97 minutes
- Country: United States
- Language: English
- Box office: $32,433

Gasoline Alley is a 2022 American action thriller film directed by Edward John Drake, starring Devon Sawa, Bruce Willis and Luke Wilson. It was released in the United States on February 25, 2022 by Saban Films.

== Plot ==
Tattoo artist Jimmy Jayne owns a tattoo parlor named Gasoline Alley. He is interviewed by Detectives Bill Freeman and Freddy Vargas, who are investigating a mass murder of prostitutes, after a lighter inscribed with his studio's name is found at the crime scene. Jayne is an ex-convict who did five years in prison for accidental manslaughter, and he was the last person to see one of the victims alive. Eventually, Freeman is revealed to be part of a human trafficking ring operating via a tunnel connecting San Diego to Tijuana. The film culminates in a shootout between Freeman and Jayne in a Mexican warehouse; with his expert marksman skills, Jayne incapacitates the rogue detective and his associate with a handful of bullets, and sets the place ablaze.

== Cast ==
- Devon Sawa as Jimmy Jayne
- Bruce Willis as Detective Bill Freeman
- Luke Wilson as Detective Freddy Vargas
- Kat Foster as Christine
- Sufe Bradshaw as Eleanor Rogers
- Johnny Dowers as Erasmus Alcindor
- Rick Salomon as Percy Muleeny
- Kenny Wormald as Dennis Bourke
- Ash Adams as Frank Flosso
- Irina Antonenko as Star
- Carrington Durham as Giselle
- Hope Golds as Lana
- Billy Harlow as Roy
- Vernon Davis as Kaiser the Bouncer
- Steve Eastin as Captain Lew Ferry
- Tracy Curry as Dr Feelgood

== Production ==
Filming began in Tifton, Georgia in March 2021. In June 2021, Saban Films acquired distribution rights to the film.

== Release ==
Gasoline Alley was released in theaters, digital and on VOD on February 25, 2022.

=== Box office ===
As of August 27, 2022, Gasoline Alley grossed $32,433 in the United Arab Emirates and Portugal.

=== Critical reception ===
On the review aggregator website Rotten Tomatoes, 26% of 23 critics' reviews are positive, with an average rating of 4.2/10.
