= Vera Krasova =

Russian model (born 1987)

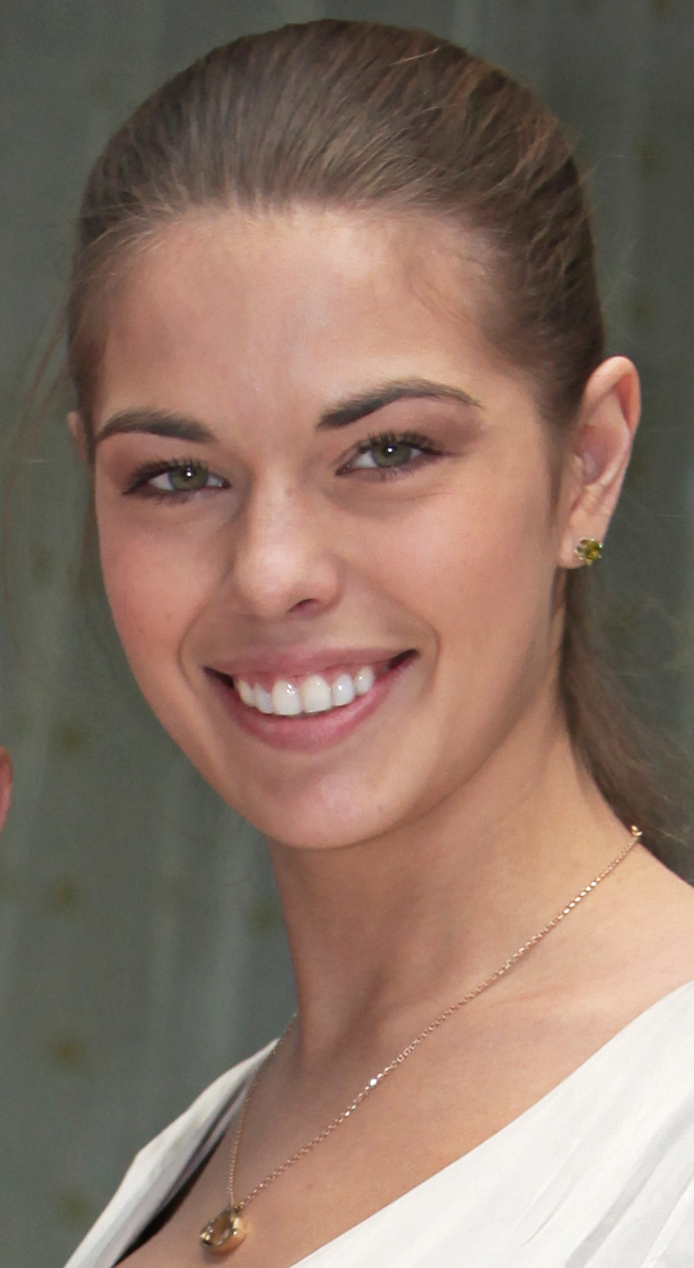
- Born: Vera Krasova; December 11, 1987 (age 38); Moscow, Russian SFSR, Soviet Union
- Height: 5 ft 8 in (1.73 m)
- Spouse: Ilya Kamolov (m.2010)
- Children: 1
- Beauty pageant titleholder
- Title: Miss Universe Russia 2008
- Hair color: Brown
- Eye color: Green
- Major competitions: Miss Russia 2007 (1st Runner-Up); Miss Universe 2008 (3rd Runner-Up)

Vera Krasova (Russian: Вера Красова; born December 11, 1987 in Moscow, Soviet Union) is a Russian model and beauty pageant titleholder. She competed in the 2007 Miss Russia pageant on December 14 where she represented Moscow. Vera made it to the top-3 contestants and placed as the 1st runner-up to the eventual winner Ksenia Sukhinova. Although she wasn't the winner of the national pageant, Miss Russia organization decided to send her to Miss Universe 2008 pageant held in Nha Trang, Vietnam. She reached the top 5 and placed 3rd runner-up, and was the only top 5 contestant from outside Latin America. This was the first time Russia finished in the Top 5 of Miss Universe since Oxana Fedorova in 2002.

Preceded by Tatiana Kotova	Miss Russia Universe; 2008	Succeeded by Sofia Rudieva
Preceded by (South Korea) Honey Lee	3rd Runner-Up Miss Universe; 2008	Succeeded by (Australia) Rachael Finch
