= Miss Universe 2008 =

57th Miss Universe pageant

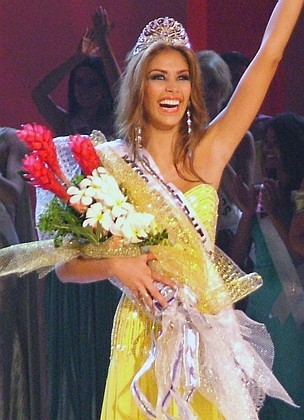
- Dayana Mendoza
- Date: July 14, 2008 (Note: The event was held at 8:00 am local time (UTC+07:00); for the Americas, this was 13 July in their local times.)
- Presenters: Jerry Springer; Mel B
- Entertainment: Lady Gaga
- Venue: Crown Convention Center, Nha Trang, Vietnam
- Broadcaster: NBC, Telemundo (international); VTV (official broadcaster)
- Entrants: 80
- Placements: 15
- Debuts: Kosovo
- Withdrawals: Barbados; Belize; Bulgaria; Guyana; Lebanon; Saint Lucia; United States Virgin Islands; Zambia
- Returns: Cayman Islands; Ghana; Guam; Ireland; Netherlands; Sri Lanka; Trinidad and Tobago; Turkey; United Kingdom; Vietnam
- Winner: Dayana Mendoza; Venezuela
- Congeniality: Rebeca Moreno, El Salvador
- Best National Costume: Gavintra Photijak, Thailand

Miss Universe 2008 was the 57th Miss Universe pageant, held at the Crown Convention Center in Nha Trang, Vietnam, on July 14, 2008. This was the first time that the Miss Universe pageant was broadcast in 1080i High-definition.

At the end of the event, Riyo Mori of Japan crowned Dayana Mendoza of Venezuela as Miss Universe 2008. It was Venezuela's first victory in twelve years, and the fifth victory of the country in the pageant's history.

Contestants from eighty countries and territories competed in this year's pageant. The pageant was hosted by Jerry Springer and member of the UK pop group Spice Girls Mel B. American singer-songwriter Lady Gaga performed in this year's pageant.

The competition also featured the debut of the new CAO Fine Jewelry Crown, which was designed by the Phu Nhuan Jewelry Company and Vietnamese-American jewelry designer Rosalina Lydster. The crown is made with 18k white and yellow gold and platinum, with over 1,000 precious stones including 44 carats (8.8 g) of diamonds. The crown is said to be worth $120,000, and will only be awarded in this edition. The Phoenix Mikimoto Crown will still be used by the winner.

== Background ==
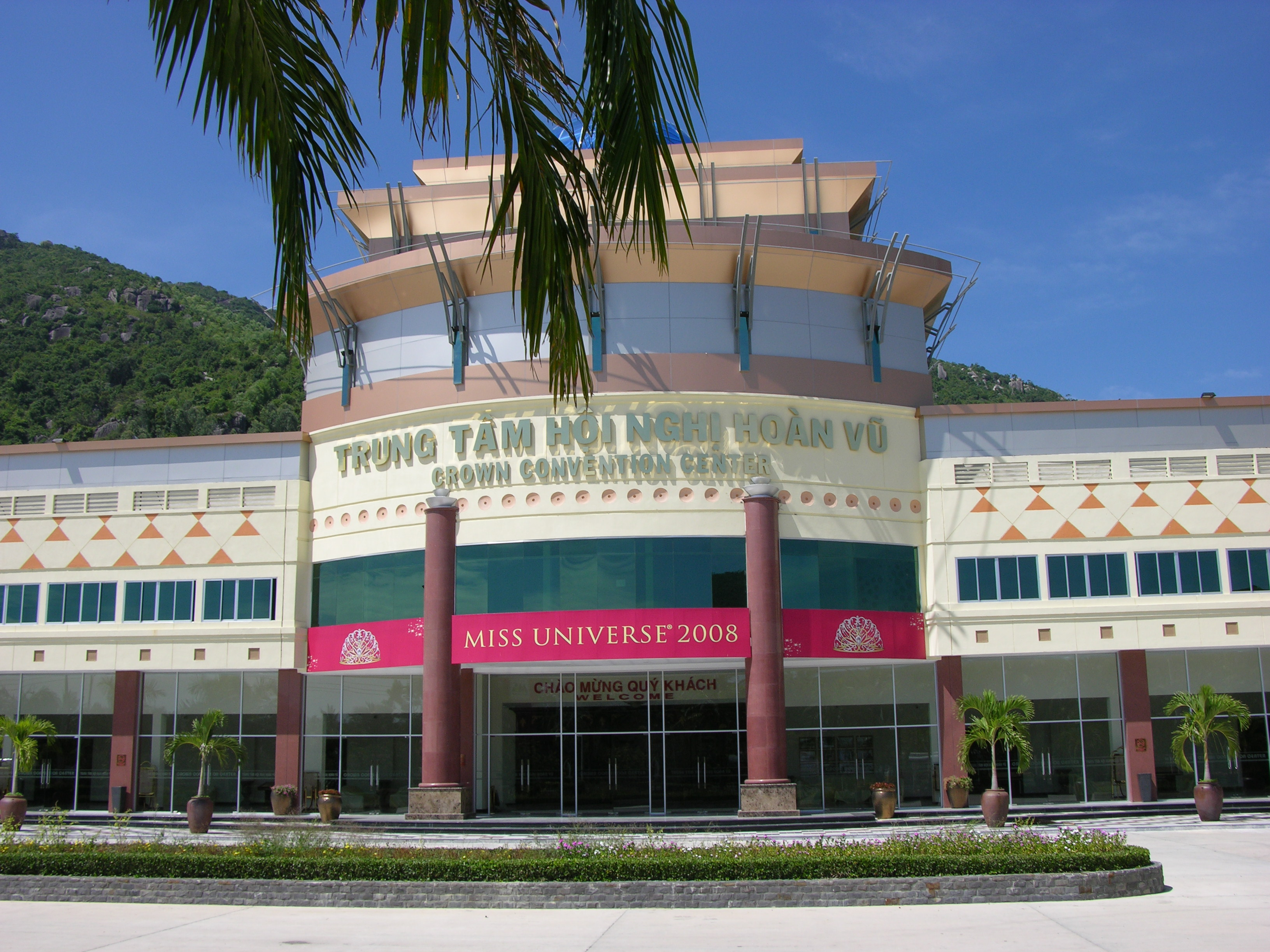
Crown Convention Center, Nha Trang, venue for Miss Universe 2008

=== Location and date ===
In August 2007, representatives of the Miss Universe Organization visited cities that bid to host the pageant such as Dubai and Hanoi to evaluate if these cities can host the pageant. During their stay in Vietnam, Paula Shugart, President of the Miss Universe Organization, also visited the cities of Nha Trang and Da Lat.

On September 26, 2007, the Vietnamese government approved the proposal of Khánh Hòa to host the pageant in Nha Trang in May 2008. This was the first major U.S.-based television production in Vietnam since the end of the Vietnam War. On November 27, 2007, the Miss Universe Organization officially announced at the Sheraton Hotel in Ho Chi Minh City that the competition will take place at the Diamond Bay Resort in Nha Trang on July 14, 2008.

The Crown Convention Center, a 7,500-seat indoor arena with an area of 10,000 square-meters was built for the pageant. It is located at the Diamond Bay Resort and was opened on June 30, 2008. It is the third biggest Convention Center in Southeast Asia.

=== Selection of participants ===
Contestants from eighty countries and territories were selected to compete in the competition. Two of these delegates were appointees to their positions after being a runner-up of their national pageant or being selected through a casting process, while six were selected to replace the original dethroned winner.

Miss Estonia 2008 Kadri Nõgu was replaced by Julia Kovaljova, the first runner-up of Miss Estonia 2008, due to undisclosed reasons. Laura Tanguy, the second runner-up of Miss France 2008, was appointed to represent France after Valérie Bègue, Miss France 2008, was not allowed to compete in international beauty pageants after suggestive photos of her appeared in the media shortly after her crowning. Nino Likuchova, Miss Georgia 2007 was stripped of her title after revealing that she was abducted at the age of 16 and was forced to marry without the consent of her parents. Her first runner-up, Nino Lekveishvili was chosen to take over the title. However, Lekveishvili was also found out to be married. Due to this, Gvantsa Daraselia was appointed to represent Georgia at Miss Universe. Vera Krasova, the first runner-up of Miss Russia 2007, was appointed to represent Russia after Ksenia Sukhinova, Miss Russia 2007, was unable to compete due to her studies. Claudia Moro was appointed as the representative of Spain after Patricia Yurena Rodríguez, Miss Spain 2008, couldn't participate because she did not meet the minimum age requirements. However, Rodríguez competed at Miss Universe five years later. Bojana Borić, the second runner-up of Miss Serbia 2007, was appointed to represent Serbia after Zorana Tasovac, the first runner-up of Miss Serbia 2007, withdrew due to undisclosed reasons.

The 2008 edition saw the debut of Kosovo and the return of the Cayman Islands, Ghana, Guam, Ireland, the Netherlands, Sri Lanka, Trinidad and Tobago, the United Kingdom, and Vietnam. Guam last competed in 2000, the Netherlands and Vietnam last competed in 2005, while the others last competed in 2006. Barbados, Belize, Bulgaria, Guyana, Lebanon, Saint Lucia, the US Virgin Islands, and Zambia withdrew. Tanisha Vernon of Belize withdrew due to internal issues between her and her national organization. Barbados, Bulgaria, Guyana, Lebanon, Saint Lucia, the US Virgin Islands, and Zambia withdrew after their respective organizations failed to hold a national competition or appoint a delegate.

== Results ==
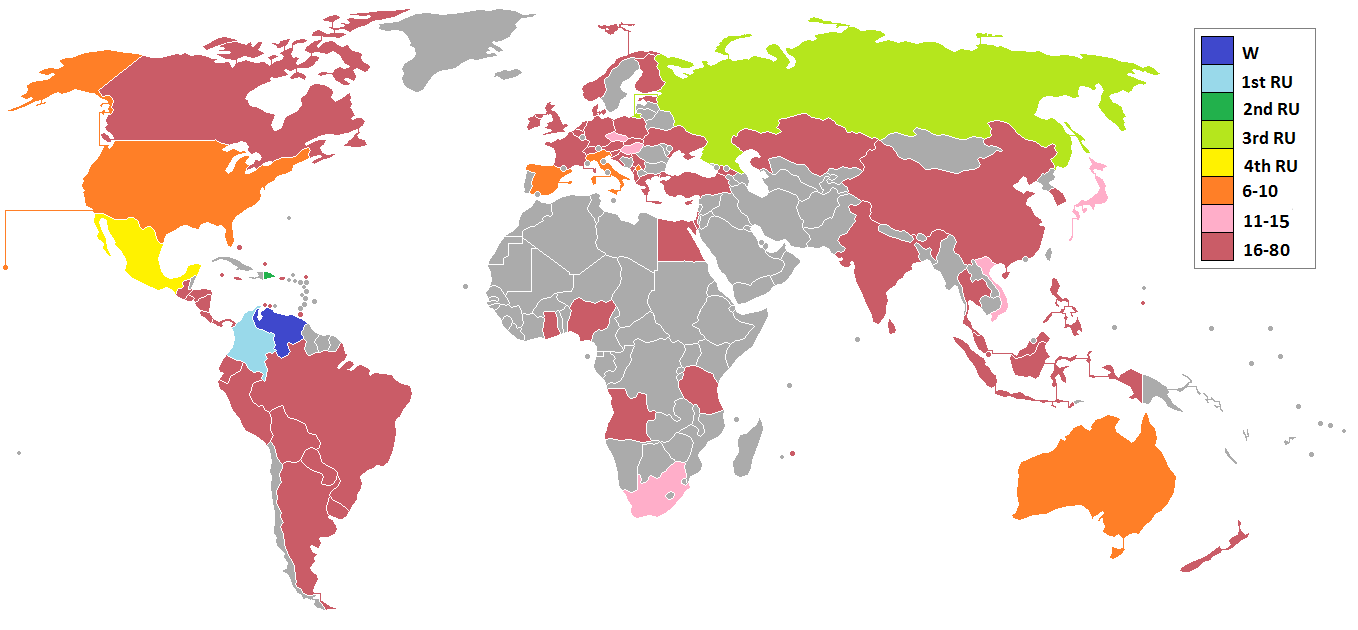
Miss Universe 2008 participating countries and territories.

=== Placements ===
Placement	Contestant
Miss Universe 2008	Venezuela – Dayana Mendoza
1st Runner-Up	Colombia – Taliana Vargas
2nd Runner-Up	Dominican Republic – Marianne Cruz
3rd Runner-Up	Russia – Vera Krasova
4th Runner-Up	Mexico – Elisa Nájera
Top 10	Australia – Laura Dundovic; Italy – Claudia Ferraris; Kosovo – Zana Krasniqi; Spain – Claudia Moro; United States – Crystle Stewart
Top 15	Czech Republic – Eliška Bučková; Hungary – Jázmin Dammak; Japan – Hiroko Mima; South Africa – Tansey Coetzee; Vietnam – Thùy Lâm Nguyễn

=== Special awards ===
Award	Contestant
Best National Costume	Thailand – Gavintra Photijak
Miss Congeniality	El Salvador – Rebeca Moreno
Most Beautiful Figure	Mexico – Elisa Nájera
Miss Ao Dai	Venezuela – Dayana Mendoza

== Pageant ==
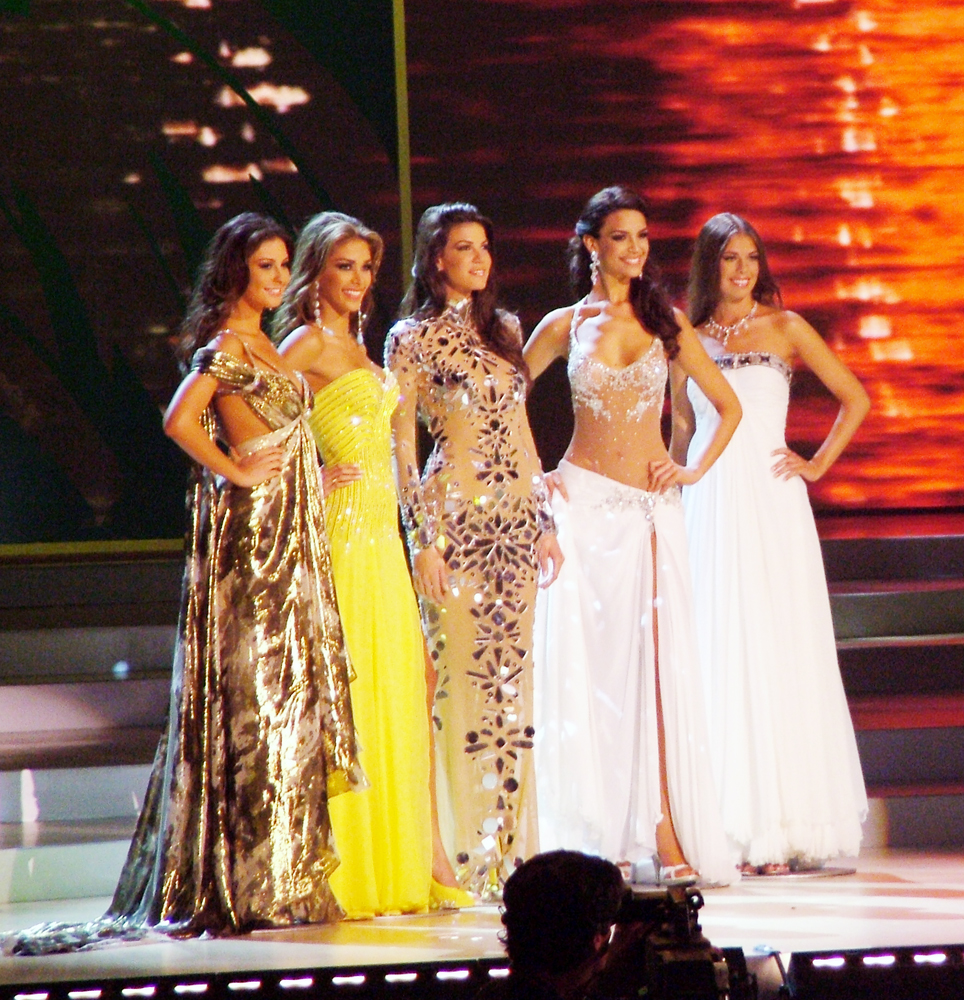
The five finalists (from left to right): Taliana Vargas, Dayana Mendoza, Marianne Cruz, Elisa Nájera, and Vera Krasova.

=== Format ===
Same with 2007, 15 semifinalists were chosen through the preliminary competition— composed of the swimsuit and evening gown competitions and closed-door interviews. The top 15 competed in the swimsuit competition and were narrowed down to the top 10 afterward. The top 10 competed in the evening gown competition and were narrowed down to the top 5 afterward. The top 5 competed in the question and answer round and the final look.

=== Selection committee ===
==== Final telecast ====
- Jennifer Hawkins – Miss Universe 2004 from Australia
- Roberto Cavalli – Italian fashion designer and entrepreneur
- Nadine Velazquez – Puerto Rican actress from the television series My Name is Earl
- Louis Licari – Celebrity hairdresser and beauty expert
- Donald Trump Jr. – Executive Vice President of The Trump Organization
- Nguyen Cong Che – Vietnamese journalist
- Joe Cinque – CEO and President of the American Academy of Hospitality Sciences
- Taryn Rose – Shoe designer
- Isha Koppikar – Indian actress and singer

== Contestants ==
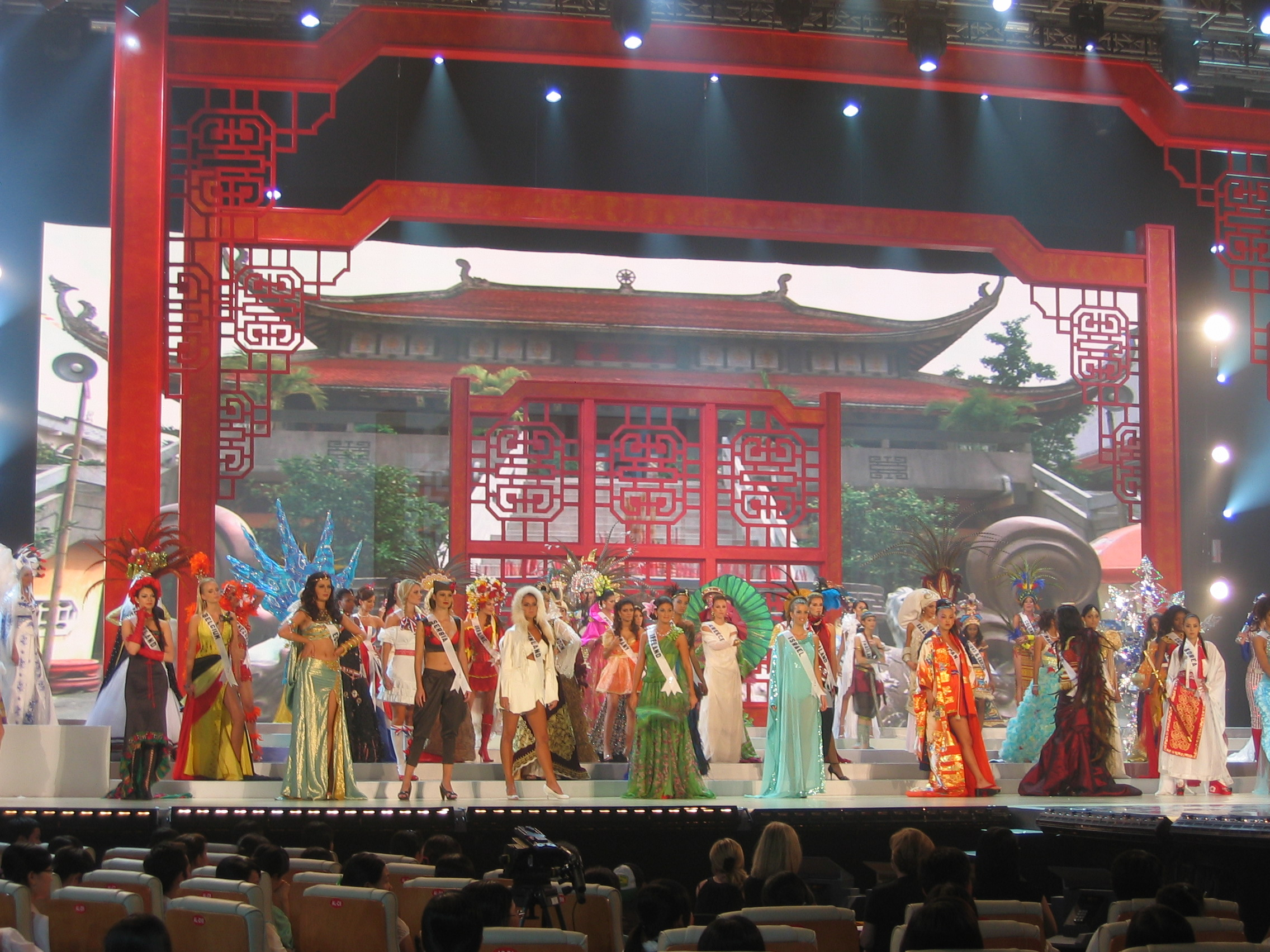
The contestants in their national costumes.

Eighty contestants competed for the title.

Country/Territory	Contestant	Age (Note: Age at time of pageant)	Hometown
Albania	Matilda Mçini	19	Tirana
Angola	Lesliana Pereira	20	M'banza-Kongo
Antigua and Barbuda	Athina James	18	St. John's
Argentina	Maria Silvana Belli	19	Villa Krause
Aruba	Tracey Nicolaas	20	Oranjestad
Australia	Laura Dundovic	21	Sydney
(The Bahamas) Bahamas	Sacha Scott	19	Nassau
Belgium	Alizée Poulicek	21	Huy
Bolivia	Katherine David	19	San Ignacio de Velasco
Brazil	Natálya Anderle	22	Encantado
Canada	Samantha Tajik	26	Richmond Hill
Cayman Islands	Rebecca Parchment	26	West Bay
China	Wei Ziya	25	Chongqing
Colombia	Taliana Vargas	20	Santa Marta
Costa Rica	María Teresa Rodríguez	21	Alajuela
Croatia	Snježana Lončarević	24	Zagreb
Curaçao	Jenyfeer Mercelina	19	Willemstad
Cyprus	Dimitra Sergiou	23	Limassol
Czech Republic	Eliška Bučková	18	Strážnice
Denmark	Maria Sten-Knudsen	18	Copenhagen
Dominican Republic	Marianne Cruz	23	Salcedo
Ecuador	Domenica Saporitti	19	Guayaquil
Egypt	Yara Naoum	20	Cairo
El Salvador	Rebeca Moreno	22	San Salvador
Estonia	Julia Kovaljova	22	Tallinn
Finland	Satu Tuomisto	21	Akaa
France	Laura Tanguy	20	Ecouflant
(Georgia (country)) Georgia	Gvantsa Daraselia	18	Tbilisi
Germany	Madina Taher	21	Elmshorn
Ghana	Yvette Nsiah	21	Accra
Greece	Dionissia Koukiou	22	Athens
Guam	Siera Robertson	18	Yona
Guatemala	Jennifer Chiong	25	Quetzaltenango
Honduras	Diana Barrasa	22	Tegucigalpa
Hungary	Jázmin Dammak	24	Budapest
India	Simran Kaur Mundi	22	Mumbai
Indonesia	Putri Raemawasti	21	Blitar
(Republic of Ireland) Ireland	Lynn Kelly	20	Dublin
Israel	Shunit Faragi	21	Kiryat Tiv'on
Italy	Claudia Ferraris	19	Bergamo
Jamaica	April Jackson	19	Ocho Ríos
Japan	Hiroko Mima	21	Tokushima
Kazakhstan	Alfina Nassyrova	20	Almaty
Kosovo	Zana Krasniqi	19	Pristina
Malaysia	Levy Li	20	Terengganu
Mauritius	Olivia Carey	19	Vacoas
Mexico	Elisa Nájera	21	Celaya
Montenegro	Daša Živković	19	Nikšić
Netherlands	Charlotte Labee	22	The Hague
New Zealand	Samantha Powell	21	Paraparaumu
Nicaragua	Thelma Rodríguez	19	Chinandega
Nigeria	Stephanie Oforka	20	Port Harcourt
Norway	Mariann Birkedal	21	Stavanger
Panama	Carolina Dementiev	19	Panama City
Paraguay	Giannina Rufinelli	22	Luque
Peru	Karol Castillo	18	Trujillo
Philippines	Jennifer Barrientos	22	San Mateo
Poland	Barbara Tatara	24	Łódź
Puerto Rico	Ingrid Marie Rivera	24	Dorado
Russia	Vera Krasova	20	Moscow
Serbia	Bojana Borić	21	Sremska Mitrovica
Singapore	Shenise Wong	26	Singapore
Slovakia	Sandra Manáková	20	Bratislava
Slovenia	Anamarija Avbelj	20	Lukovica
South Africa	Tansey Coetzee	23	Johannesburg
South Korea	Sun Lee	25	Seoul
Spain	Claudia Moro	22	Madrid
Sri Lanka	Aruni Rajapaksha	24	Kandy
Switzerland	Amanda Ammann	21	Abtwil
Tanzania	Amanda Ole Sululu	21	Arusha
Thailand	Gavintra Photijak	21	Nongkhai
Trinidad and Tobago	Anya Ayoung-Chee	26	Maraval
Turkey	Sinem Sülün	19	Istanbul
Turks and Caicos Islands	Angelica Lightbourne	19	Providenciales
Ukraine	Eleonora Masalab	19	Kharkiv
United Kingdom	Lisa Lazarus	20	Swansea
United States	Crystle Stewart	26	Missouri City
Uruguay	Paula Díaz	19	Ciudad de la Costa
Venezuela	Dayana Mendoza	22	Caracas
Vietnam	Thùy Lâm Nguyễn	20	Thái Bình
