= Svetlana Stepankovskaya =

1st Runner-up of Miss Russia 2009 (born 1985)

- Born: Svetlana Stepankovskaya; Russia
- Height: 1.83 m (6 ft 0 in)
- Beauty pageant titleholder
- Title: Miss Russia 2009 (1st Runner-up)
- Hair color: Blond
- Eye color: Blue

Svetlana Stepankovskaya (Russian: Светлана Степанковская; born 1985) is a Russian model and is the 1st runner-up of Miss Russia 2009.

== Miss Russia 2009 ==
Stepankovskaya won the title off Miss Krasnodar in 2008 and represented Krasnodarskiy Kray at the Miss Russia 2009 pageant in Moscow on March 7, where she placed as 1st runner-up to the eventual winner, Sofia Rudieva.

In January 2011, she joined the girl band Mobilnye Blondinki.
