= Irina Antonenko =

Russian actress, model, and beauty pageant titleholder (born 1991)

- Ирина Антоненко
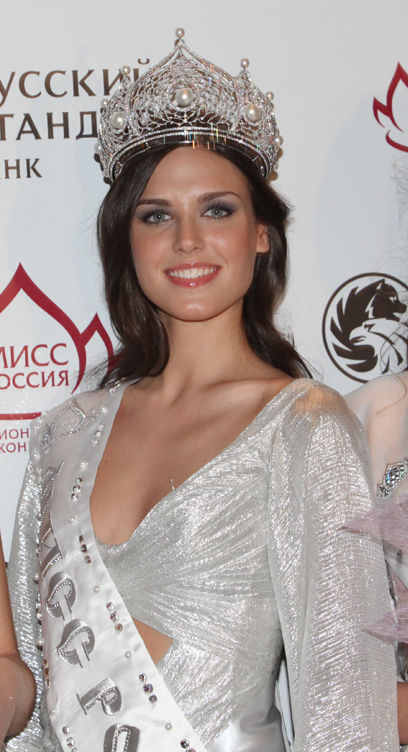
- Antonenko as Miss Russia in 2010
- Born: Irina Igorevna Antonenko; 1 September 1991 (age 35); Magdeburg, Germany
- Height: 1.77 m (5 ft 9 1/2 in)
- Beauty pageant titleholder
- Title: Miss Russia 2010
- Hair color: Brown
- Eye color: Grey
- Major competitions: Miss Russia 2010 (Winner); Miss Universe 2010

Irina Anto (Antonenko) (Russian: Ири́на И́горевна Анто́ненко; born 1 September 1991) is a Russian actress, model and beauty pageant titleholder who was crowned Miss Russia 2010. She also placed in the Top 15 at the Miss Universe 2010 pageant held on August 23, 2010 in Las Vegas.

== Life and career ==
Irina Antonenko was born on 1 September 1991 in Magdeburg, Germany. Her parents, Natalia and Igor Antonenko, were both employees of the police. She completed her high school education in school No. 156. According to the school director, Irina was "a very modest and polite girl." Whilst studying at the school, Antonenko entered her first beauty pageant, in which she failed to make the top three. After finishing high school, she began to study finance at the Ural Finance and Jurisprudence Institute, around the same time, she also started her modelling career.

In 2009, having won the title "Miss Yekaterinburg", Irina decided to go to Moscow to the national beauty contest. In mid-February 2010 it sent to the capital to take part in the preparations for the finals of "Miss Russia".

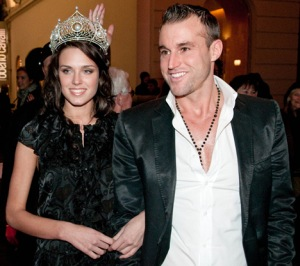
Antonenko and fashion designer Philipp Plein in March 2010 in Moscow

After her coronation as Miss Russia, she started modelling for the world-famous designer Philipp Plein, and also participated in fashion shows by such designers as Olga Deffi, Alina Assi, Ilya Shiyan, Irina Natanova and Vyacheslav Zaitsev, one of the most well-known Russian fashion designers.

Antonenko stands 178 centimetres (5.84 ft) tall, and has the measurements 80 centimetres (31 in) (chest), 61 centimetres (24 in) (waist) and 91 centimetres (36 in) (hips).

While preparing for the Miss Universe 2010 competition, she stated that she doesn't have a boyfriend yet. "I haven’t got any time for boyfriends. My day begins with English classes and come to a end with fashion parade late in the evening. I rarely think about men now, but, of course, love is inside each of us." She will be accompanied by her mother and grandmother to Las Vegas where the contest is held. Her main dress at the competition was a $60,000 Empire style hand-made evening silk dress by Jacob Schaefer. As the traditional gift required by each participant, she brought hand-painted Matryoshkas. Each of them had a picture of one of the 2005-2009 Miss Universe winners.

Antonenko believes her best qualities are persistence, sincerity and friendliness, as well as drive and passion in the fight for victory.

== Filmography ==
The following films feature Irina Antonenko.

Year	Title	Role	Notes
2011	The Darkest Hour	Club beauty	
2014	The Ship	Alena Gromova	TV series
2014	Surprise for the beloved	Nika	TV
2015	Weddings will not be	Alisa	TV
2015	The Ship - 2	Alena Gromova	TV series
2015	Golden Cage	Alina	TV series
2016	Santa Claus. Battle of the Magi	Lina	
2019	Break	Katya	
2022	Gasoline Alley	Star	Movie

Awards and achievements
Preceded by Sofia Rudieva	Miss Russia; 2010	Succeeded by Natalia Gantimurova
