= Natálya Anderle =

Brazilian model (born 1986)

- Born: Natálya Anderle; June 23, 1986 (age 40); Encantado, Rio Grande do Sul, Brazil
- Beauty pageant titleholder
- Title: Miss Rio Grande do Sul 2008; Miss Brasil 2008
- Hair color: Brown
- Eye color: Brown
- Major competitions: Miss Brasil 2008 (Winner); Miss Universe 2008

Natálya Anderle (born June 23, 1986 in Encantado, Rio Grande do Sul) is a Brazilian model and beauty pageant titleholder who won Miss Brazil 2008 and represented her country at Miss Universe 2008. Natálya was crowned (with piece created by Ricardo Vieira) by Miss Brazil 2007, Natália Guimarães.

== Information ==
The winner of the beauty contest received the biggest prize offered since 1954: R$250,000, one car and a china porcelain watch. Miss Brazil 2008 represented Brazil at the Miss Universe 2008, on July 15, Nha Trang, Vietnam.

Natálya represented Encantado at the contest of her state, and she was crowned Miss Rio Grande do Sul on October 16, 2007. When she was asked what she intended to do with the money, she said that she would invest it in her family business; her parents own farms on Rio Grande do Sul and the family owns a large development construction business managed by her brother Lucas Alberto Anderle.

Natálya, 1.75 m (5 ft 9 in), worked as steticist and babysitter in Encantado. Her soccer team is Grêmio. She is graduated in Cosmetology and her favourite film is Legends of the Fall.

Awards and achievements
Preceded by (Minas Gerais) Natália Guimarães	Miss Universo Brasil; 2008	Succeeded by (Rio Grande do Norte) Larissa Costa
Preceded by Carolina Prates Néry	Miss Rio Grande do Sul; 2008	Succeeded by Bruna Gabriele Philibert
