= Miss Saint Pierre and Miquelon =

- Type: Beauty pageant
- Headquarters: Saint Pierre and Miquelon, France
- Members: Miss France
- Official language: French
- Regional director: Marjolaine Poulet

Miss Saint Pierre and Miquelon (French: Miss Saint-Pierre-et-Miquelon) is a French beauty pageant which selects a representative for the Miss France national competition from the overseas collectivity of Saint Pierre and Miquelon. The first titleholder was crowned in 1984, although the pageant was not organized regularly until 2008. Beginning in 2011, the competition became organized on a biennial basis, although a new titleholder has not been crowned since 2017.

The most recent Miss Saint Pierre and Miquelon is Héloïse Urtizbéréa, who was crowned Miss Saint Pierre and Miquelon 2017 on 8 July 2017. No Miss Saint Pierre and Miquelon titleholders have gone on to win Miss France.

== Results summary ==
No Miss Saint Pierre and Miquelon titleholders have reached the semifinals of Miss France.

== Titleholders ==
Year	Name	Age (Note: Ages at the time of Miss France)	Height	Hometown	Miss France placement	Notes
2017	Héloïse Urtizbéréa	18	1.80 m (5 ft 11 in)	Miquelon-Langlade		
2015	Julie Briand	19	1.75 m (5 ft 9 in)	Saint-Pierre		
2013	Clio Victorri	23	1.73 m (5 ft 8 in)	Saint-Pierre		
2011	Lison Yon	20	1.73 m (5 ft 8 in)	Saint-Pierre		
2010	Léa Harnett	18	1.73 m (5 ft 8 in)	Saint-Pierre		
2009	Marie Serba	18	1.80 m (5 ft 11 in)	Saint-Pierre		
2008	Cathy Sabarotz	22	1.70 m (5 ft 7 in)	Saint-Pierre		
1984	Valérie Tillard			Saint-Pierre		
