= Larissa Costa =

Brazilian model

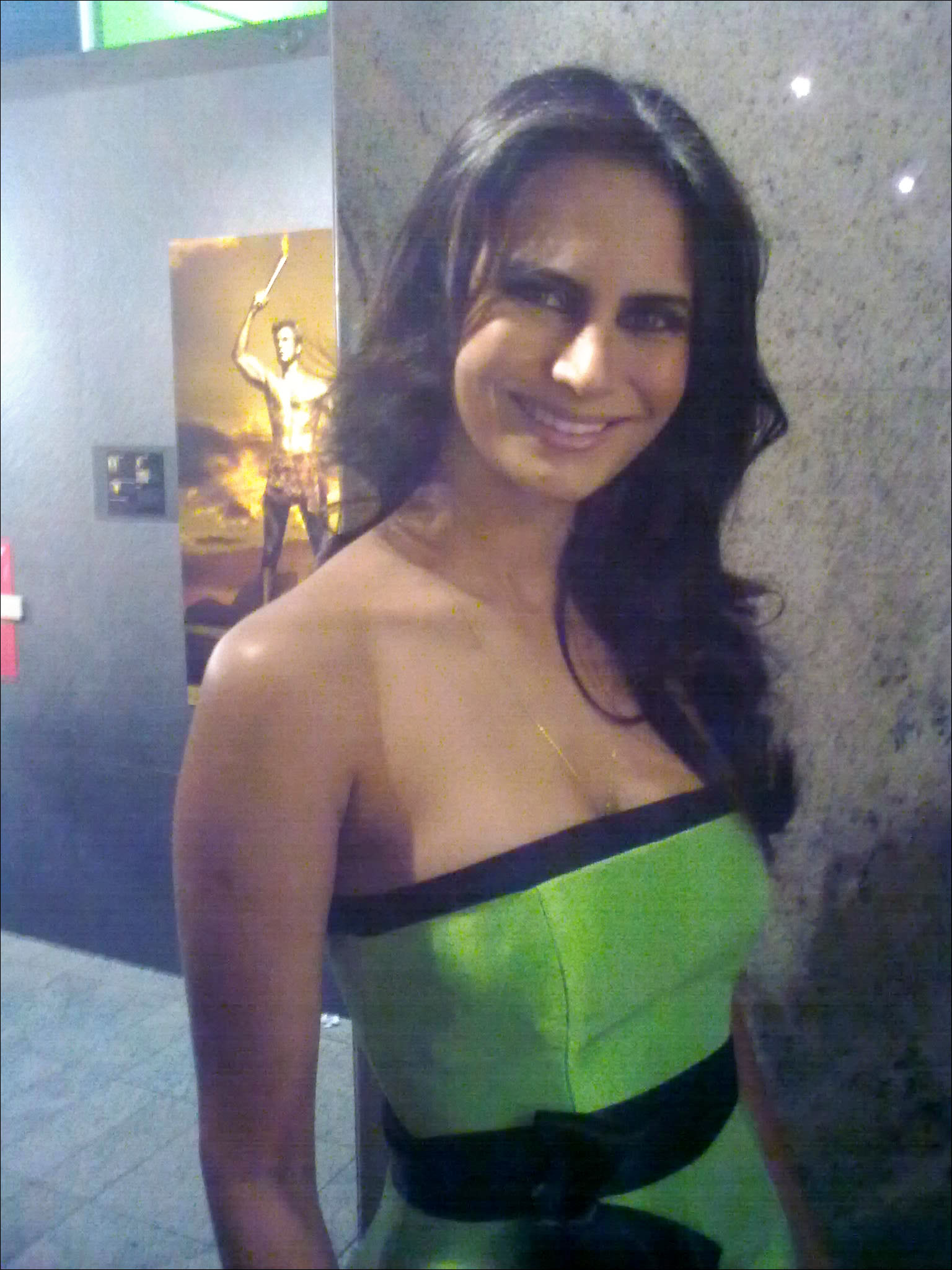
- Born: March 9, 1984 (age 42); Natal, Rio Grande do Norte, Brazil
- Occupations: Pedagogue and model
- Height: 1.76 m (5 ft 9 1/2 in)
- Beauty pageant titleholder
- Title: Miss Rio Grande do Norte 2009; Miss Brasil 2009
- Hair color: Brown
- Eye color: Green
- Major competitions: Miss Rio Grande do Norte 2009 (Winner); Miss Brasil 2009 (Winner)

Larissa Costa Silva de Oliveira (born March 9, 1984), commonly known as Larissa Costa, is a Brazilian model and beauty pageant titleholder who won the Miss Brasil 2009. Larissa Costa represented Brazil in the Miss Universe 2009.

== Biography ==
Born in Natal, Rio Grande do Norte, she is graduated in pedagogy, and works in the Secretaria de Educação de Natal (Secretariat of Education of Natal).

== Pageants ==
Larissa Costa won the Miss Rio Grande do Norte in 2009, representing the city of São Gonçalo do Amarante. She won the national pageant in 2009 representing Rio Grande do Norte state. She beat the 1st runner-up, Rayanne Morais, of Minas Gerais state and the 2nd runner-up, Denise Ribeiro, of the Distrito Federal. Larissa Costa's coronation as Miss Brasil ended her region's 20-year period without winning the beauty contest, as in 1989, Flávia Cavalcante, from Ceará state, won the contest.

She represented Brazil at the Miss Universe 2009 in Nassau, Bahamas but failed to place.

Awards and achievements
Preceded by (Rio Grande do Sul) Natália Anderle	Miss Universo Brasil; 2009	Succeeded by (Minas Gerais) Débora Lyra
Preceded by Andressa Mello	Miss Rio Grande do Norte; 2009	Succeeded by Joyce Oliver
