= Miss Universo Italia 2008 =

Beauty pageant in Riccione, Italy

- Date: May 31, 2008
- Venue: Palariccione, Riccione, Italy
- Winner: Claudia Ferraris

The Miss Universo Italia 2008 pageant was held on May 31, 2008. The chosen winner will represent the Italy at Miss Universe 2008.

== Results ==
- Miss Universo Italia 2008 : Claudia Ferraris
