= Ksenia Sukhinova =

Russian model, actress, presenter, and beauty queen

- Ксе́ния Сухи́нова
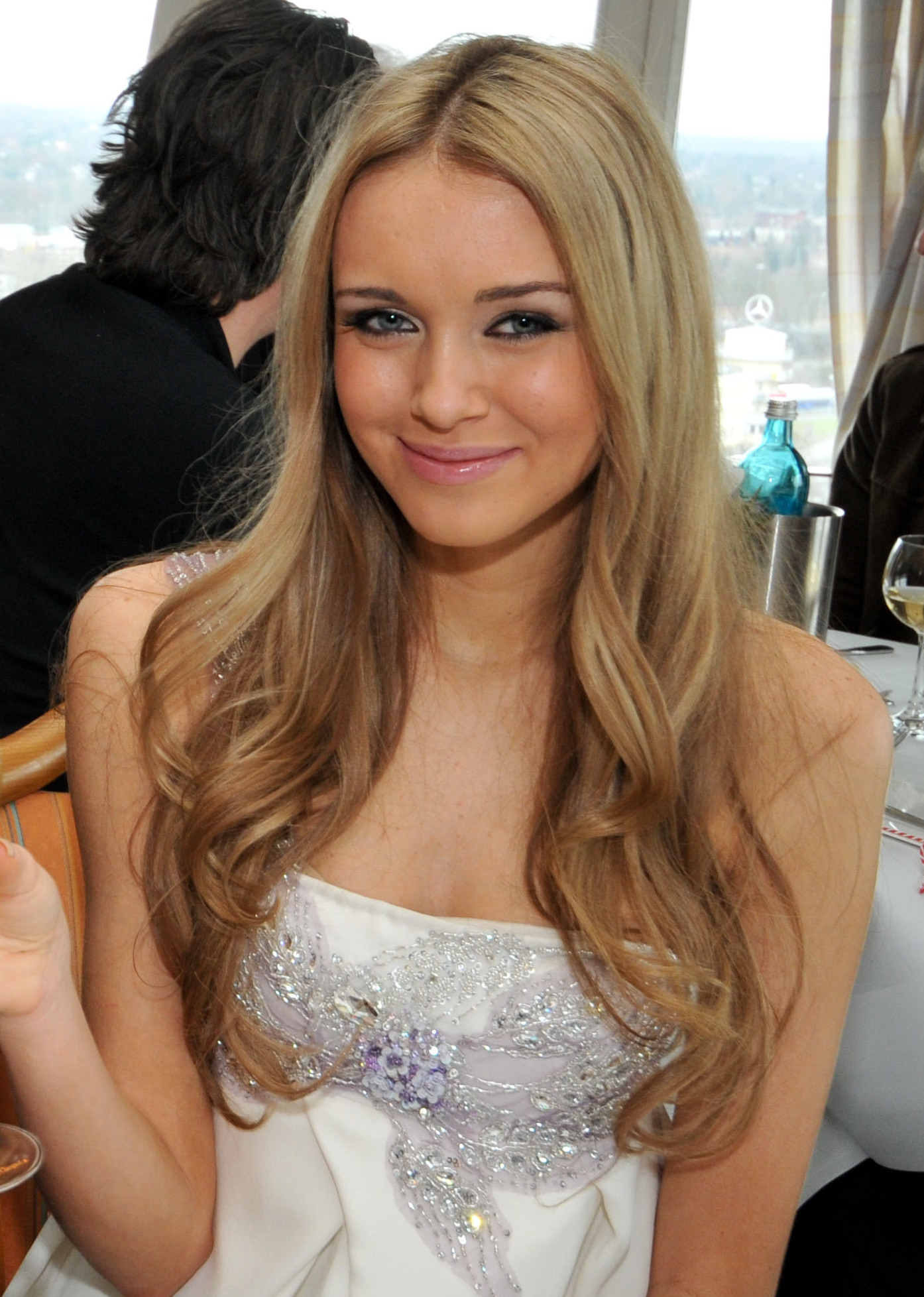
- Born: Ksenia Vladimirovna Sukhinova; 26 August 1987 (age 39); Nizhnevartovsk, Russian SFSR, USSR
- Height: 1.78 m (5 ft 10 in)
- Children: 1
- Beauty pageant titleholder
- Title: Miss Tyumen 2007; Miss Russia 2007; Miss World 2008
- Hair color: Blond
- Eye color: Blue
- Major competitions: Miss Russia 2007 (Winner); Miss World 2008 (Winner)

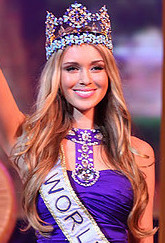
Ksenia Sukhinova during the Miss World coronation ceremony.

Ksenia Vladimirovna Sukhinova (Russian: Ксе́ния Влади́мировна Сухи́нова; born 26 August 1987) is a Russian tv host, model and beauty queen who was crowned Miss World 2008. She was the second Russian woman to win the Miss World title and had previously been crowned Miss Russia 2007.

== Personal life ==
Sukhinova was born in Nizhnevartovsk, Russian SFSR.

Sukhinova's height is 1.78 m (5 ft 10 in), and she has blonde hair and blue eyes. Her first name is often romanized as Ksenya or Kseniya. Her favorite book is The Master and Margarita by Mikhail Bulgakov.

In 2022, she gave birth to a son, Artem. The child's father is Yuri Shefler, her boyfriend, a businessman and the owner of alcoholic beverages manufacturer SPI Group.

== Miss Tyumen ==
Before Sukhinova became Miss Russia 2007 and Miss World 2008, she entered the Miss Tyumen pageant and won the title, becoming Tyumen's representative at Miss Russia 2007.

== Miss Russia 2007 ==
Sukhinova won the 2007 Miss Russia pageant on 14 December 2007 in Moscow, where she represented Tyumen. She surpassed 50 other contestants from across Russia. She was unable to represent Russia at Miss Universe 2008 due to her college studies, so her first runner-up, Vera Krasova, replaced her in the pageant. Krasova placed as the third runner-up to Venezuela's Dayana Mendoza.

== Miss World 2008 ==
On 13 December 2008, Sukhinova was crowned Miss World 2008 at the finals in Johannesburg, South Africa, ahead of 108 other contestants.

At a press conference after her victory, she said: "I am very glad to have brought this crown to Russia. I am proud that it is Russia that got the crown and I devote my victory to the whole country and to its every citizen... and to my grandmother." She also said that she hoped to improve Russia's international image and show that a girl from Russia could personify kindness, beauty and happiness. She is the second Russian woman to win Miss World, some 16 years after Julia Kourotchkina won the title in 1992.

She crowned Kaiane Aldorino of Gibraltar in the 59th Miss World pageant held in South Africa on December 12, 2009.

Awards and achievements
Preceded by (China) Zhang Zilin	Miss World; 2008	Succeeded by (Gibraltar) Kaiane Aldorino
Preceded by (Sweden) Annie Oliv	Miss World Europe; 2008	Succeeded by (Gibraltar) Kaiane Aldorino
Preceded by (China) Zhang Zilin	Miss World Top Model; 2008	Succeeded by (Mexico) Perla Beltrán
Preceded by Tatiana Kotova	Miss Russia; 2007	Succeeded by Sofia Rudieva
