= Sinko =

Sinko may refer to:

- Sinko, Guinea
- Sinko, Senegal, in Sindian Arrondissement
