= Cinco =

Cinco is Spanish and Portuguese for 'five', and may refer to:

== Places ==
- Cinco (crater), a crater on the Moon
- Cinco Ranch, Texas, United States
- Cinco, West Virginia, United States

== Others ==
- Cinco (film), a 2010 Filipino psychological horror film
- Cinco, a fictional company on the Tim and Eric Awesome Show, Great Job! television series
- Cinco, a 2017 comedy special by Jim Gaffigan

== See also ==
- Cinco de Mayo, a celebration held May 5th
- Sinko (disambiguation)
- Synco, the Spanish name for Project Cybersyn, a Chilean economic project during the 1970s
