= Joe Cinque =

American felon and mobster

Joseph V. Cinque (1938) is an American felon and mobster. He was CEO and president of the American Academy of Hospitality Sciences (AAHS).

== Names ==
Cinque has been known by the nicknames "the Preppy Don" and "Joey No Socks". In an April 1995 profile in New York magazine, Cinque was described as a "small-time mobster, a scam artist, and an art fence."

== Career ==
In 1980, Cinque was shot three times and left for dead. While Cinque described the incident as a robbery, officials indicated it was likely an attempted contract killing by the mafia.

== Stolen artworks ==
Cinque was arrested in 1989 on felony charges when stolen art was found in his apartment. After police used a battering ram to gain access to his home, they found 40 works of art, including pieces by Joan Miró and Frederic Remington. Among the artworks were three pieces that had been stolen from Manhattan galleries in April. Cinque had two signed Marc Chagall prints in his possession that were valued at over $20,000 each and were stolen from the Center Art Gallery. He also had a $9000 sculpture by Cecille Schatzberg that had been stolen from the Lever Brothers Gallery. Authorities investigated Cinque's alleged role as a fence for an art theft ring. He was initially charged with criminal possession of stolen property. After an informant relayed a conversation that Cinque had with Gambino boss John Gotti where Gotti said that he would "take care of the D.A." and the D.A.'s office was informed that Cinque had been dealing drugs out of his apartment, a felony charge was sought. Cinque pleaded guilty but did not serve any jail time. Cinque had previously been arrested for criminal possession of stolen property, insurance fraud, and grand larceny. In a memoir, New York plastic surgeon Richard Lawrence Dombroff related that Cinque said he had purchased stolen jewelry and stayed out of prison because he worked as an informant for the government.

== Businesses ==
In partnership with Toby Beavers, Michael Ault, and Gary Pryor, Cinque ran the Surf Club and the Crane Club in New York. He said that he was Beavers' insurance policy against "trouble with the mob" at the Surf Club and the Zulu Lounge. Cinque helped launch the MercBar in 1993, representing the club before the State Liquor Authority.

== Hospitality academy and Donald Trump ==
Cinque is President and CEO of the American Academy of Hospitality Sciences. The academy is run from Cinque's Central Park South apartment in Manhattan and has been cited for extensive connections to the friends and family of Donald Trump. He began the academy's Star Diamond Awards that he deemed the "Academy Awards" of hospitality. In 1989, he moved the organization from Chicago to New York and made its scope international.

== Personal life ==
In 2006, Cinque was pulled over for driving under the influence. He refused a breathalyzer and failed a series of field sobriety tests. He was convicted but later appealed the ruling, with his physician testifying that Cinque had chronic lead poisoning due to "multiple lead pellets in his body." Cinque's former girlfriend, Despina Zahariades, also alleged domestic abuse, saying that he beat her and took her for $60,000.

Alongside Donald Trump Jr., Cinque served as a judge for the 2008 Miss Universe pageant.

At a 2016 New Year's Eve celebration, Cinque awarded president-elect Donald Trump with a “a One-of-a-Kind bronze Eagle award” from the AAHS, where Trump had previously been a trustee.

Cinque appeared alongside Trump at a New Year's Eve party on January 3, 2017.
