= Sofia Rudieva =

Russian actress, model and beauty pageant titleholder

- София Рудьева
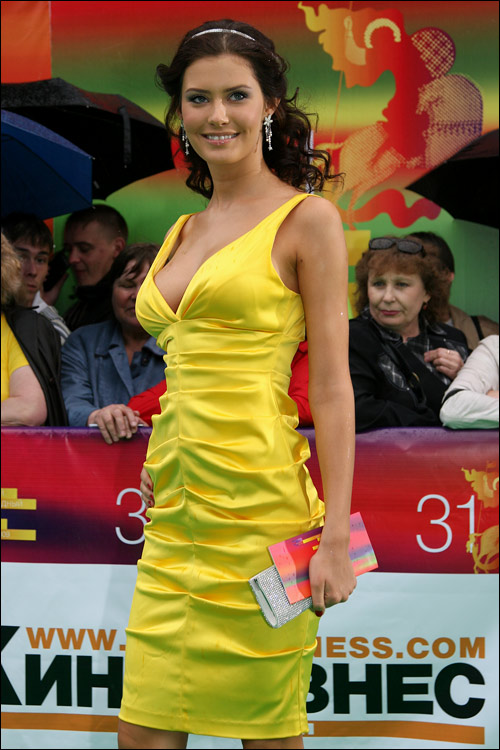
- Rudieva in Moscow, 2009
- Born: Sofya Andreyevna Rudieva; 15 November 1990 (age 34); Leningrad, Soviet Union
- Height: 1.78 m (5 ft 10 in)
- Beauty pageant titleholder
- Title: Miss Russia 2009 (Winner); Miss Universe 2009 (Unplaced)
- Hair color: Brown
- Eye color: Blue

Sofia Andreyevna Rudieva (Russian: София Андреевна Рудьева; born 15 November 1990) is a Russian actress, model and beauty pageant titleholder who was crowned Miss Russia 2009 and then represented Russia at Miss Universe 2009.

== Biography ==
Sofia Rudieva was born in 1990 in Leningrad, now Saint Petersburg.

In March, 2009, she won the Miss Russia 2009 pageant, and was awarded with a $100,000 prize.

After her victory, she was named Russia's representative in the Miss Universe 2009 contest, which was to be held in the Bahamas in August, 2009.

Miss Universe 2009 crown was won by Venezuela's Stefanía Fernández but Sofia did not place.

== See also ==
- Ksenia Sukhinova
- Svetlana Stepankovskaya

Preceded by Ksenia Sukhinova	Miss Russia; 2009	Succeeded by Irina Antonenko
Preceded by Vera Krasova	Miss Russia Universe; 2009	Succeeded by Irina Antonenko
