= American Academy of Hospitality Sciences =

The American Academy of Hospitality Sciences (AAHS) is a for-profit business based in New York City that reviews and bestows awards on hotels, resorts, spas, airlines, cruise lines, automobiles, products, restaurants and chefs. The academy began as a restaurant rating business, founded in 1949. The academy is best known for its International Star Diamond Award.

The academy is based in New York City and is directed by Joseph Cinque. The independence of the organization and its Star Diamond award have been questioned. The academy has been accused of being closely linked to the business interests of 45th and 47th US President Donald Trump. In May 2015, the group listed Trump as an "ambassador extraordinaire" for the Academy. Trump himself, a number of his apparent friends and his sons have all served on the organization's board of trustees.

== See also ==
- Confederation of Tourism and Hospitality
