= Geneviève de Fontenay =

French businesswoman (1932–2023)

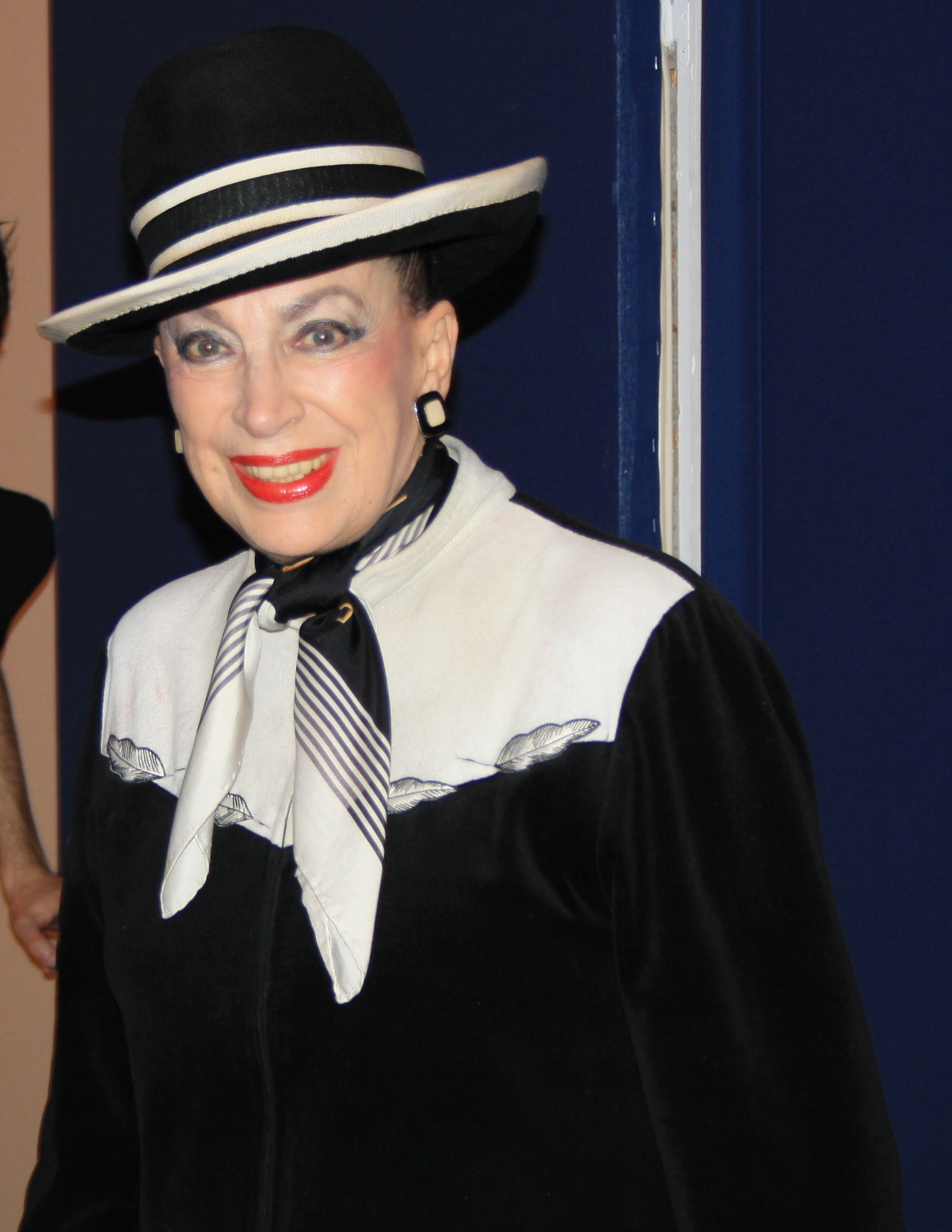
- Fontenay in 2011
- Born: Geneviève Suzanne Marie-Thérèse Mulmann; 30 August 1932; Longwy, France
- Died: 1 August 2023 (aged 90); Saint-Cloud, France
- Occupation: Businesswoman
- Known for: President of the Miss France Committee (1981–2007); President of Miss Prestige National (2010–2016)
- Partner: Louis Poirot (1954–1981; his death)
- Children: 2

Geneviève Suzanne Marie-Thérèse Mulmann (30 August 1932 – 1 August 2023), known professionally as Geneviève de Fontenay (French pronunciation: [ʒənvjɛv də fɔ̃tnɛ]), was a French businesswoman who served as the president of the Miss France Committee from 1981 until 2007. After leaving her position with Miss France, Fontenay created the beauty pageant Miss Prestige National in 2010, and served as its president until her retirement in 2016.

== Early life and education ==
Geneviève Suzanne Marie-Thérèse Mulmann was born on 30 August 1932 in Longwy, Lorraine, as the daughter of André Mulmann and Marie-Thérèse Martin. The eldest of ten children, her father was a mining engineer at the Hagondange steelworks. Fontenay was educated at a hospitality school in Strasbourg, and later moved to Paris to train as a beautician at age 17. In the 1950s, Fontenay settled in Saint-Cloud with her partner, where she began to work as a fashion designer and model.

== Career ==
=== Miss France (1954–2010) ===
Fontenay began her career with the Miss France Committee in 1954 as its general secretary, often taking on extra roles such as chauffeur, coach and costume designer. After Fontenay's partner Louis Poirot became the general delegate of Miss France, Fontenay became his assistant in 1962.

Fontenay became the president of the Miss France Committee in 1981, following the death of Poirot, who had previously held the office. Upon taking control of the organization, Fontenay and her son, Xavier Poirot de Fontenay, transformed the organization into a company. In 2002, they sold portions of the business to Endemol Shine France, to assist with commercial and television aspects of the organization.

Fontenay ignited controversy in France in the aftermath of Miss France 2008 in December 2007, with the crowning of winner Valérie Bègue. Two weeks following Bègue's victory, clothed but suggestive photos of Bègue were released by the French tabloid Entrevue. After the release of the photos, Fontenay appeared on French radio demanding that Bègue resign her title due to the photos or she would be forcibly dethroned, adding that if Endemol Shine France disagreed with the decision, Fontenay would resign as president. Four years prior, Fontenay had successfully obtained the ouster of Lætitia Bléger as Miss France 2004, as Bléger was revealed to have posed nude in the French edition of Playboy, for a ban of six months. When Bègue refused to resign, Fontenay was accused of racism for stating that Bègue should have stayed in her home region of Réunion, part of overseas France, which led to uproar within Réunion. Fontenay ultimately came to a compromise with Bègue, allowing her to remain Miss France while losing the right to represent France internationally at Miss Universe and Miss World.

In the aftermath of the controversy with Bègue, Fontenay left her position as president of the Miss France Committee, while remaining affiliated with the organization. She was replaced by Sylvie Tellier, who began to serve as national director of Miss France, taking on much of the responsibilities previously held by Fontenay as the public face of the competition.

In 2010, Fontenay officially cut ties with Miss France.

=== Miss Prestige Nationale (2010–2016) ===
After severing ties with the Miss France Committee in 2010, Fontenay announced plans to start her own national beauty pageant meant to serve as a competitor to Miss France. Later that year, she launched Miss Nationale, serving as its inaugural president. Following a legal dispute with Michel Le Parmentier, the owner of the Miss Nationale brand, Fontenay confirmed that the pageant would be renamed to Miss Prestige Nationale in 2011. In January 2016, Fontenay stepped down from her role with Miss Prestige Nationale in order to retire from the beauty pageant industry.

== Public image ==
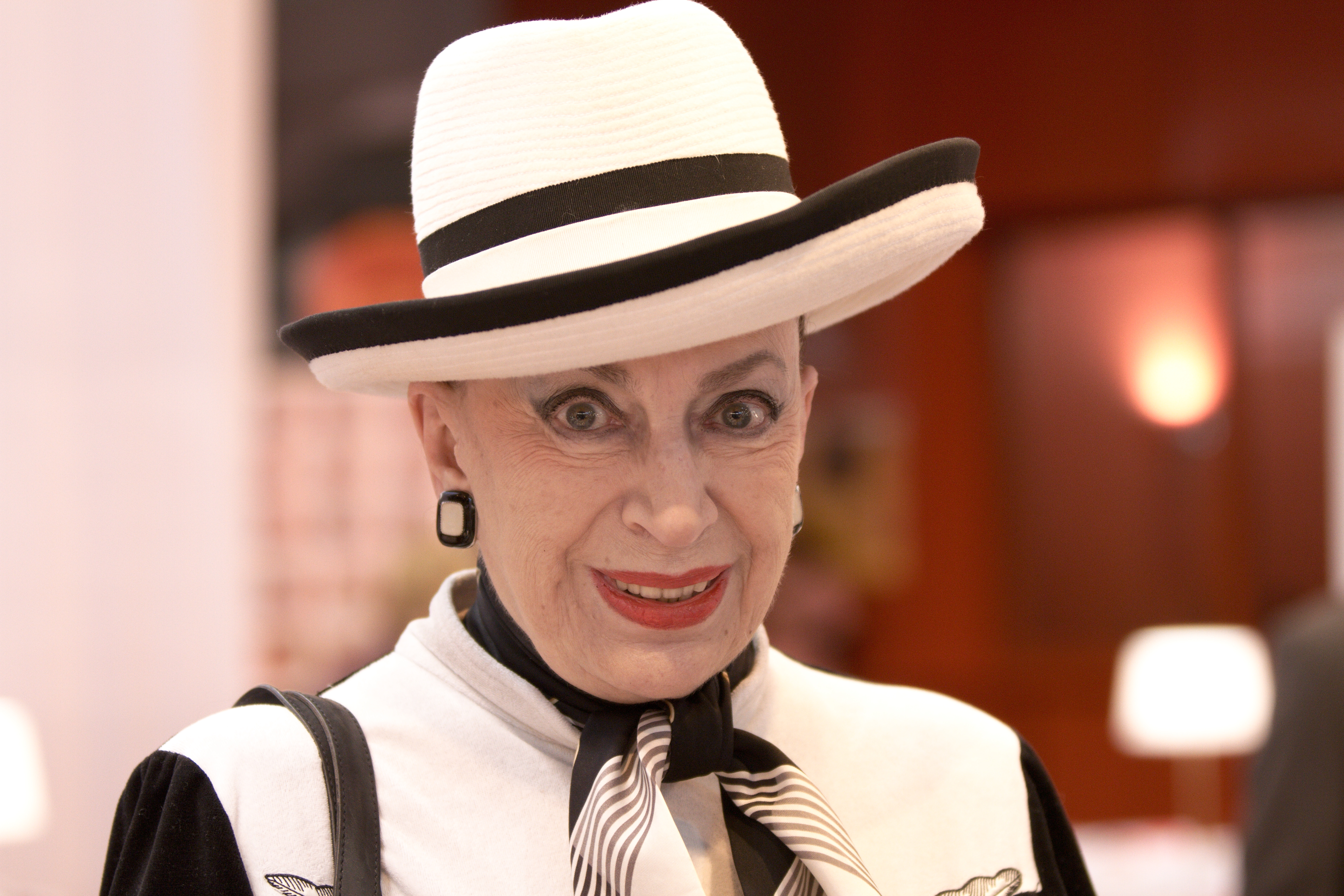
Fontenay in 2010, wearing her signature black and white outfit with a hat.

Throughout her time as a public figure, Fontenay cultivated a reputation for her style of dress. From 1957 until her death, Fontenay continuously wore a brimmed hat in all of her public appearances, while her outfits were almost always made from a black and white color palette. According to Fontenay, she had adopted this style at the advice of her long-term partner Louis Poirot, as he claimed that her head was too small for her body, and a hat would disguise that. The hat became Fontenay's trademark, and she became known as la Dame au Chapeau (English: The lady in the hat) by the French media.

In 2015, Fontenay revealed that she was reportedly offered the Legion of Honour, the highest French order of merit, but declined to be honoured, stating "It's really desacralizing the ribbon to distribute it to anyone, like chocolate medals."

== Personal life ==
Fontenay first met Louis Poirot in 1952, and they became long-term partners when they met again in 1954. Despite claiming to be a former French Resistance fighter and journalist, Poirot was a fraudster who had been convicted of fraud and forgery. As Poirot used the name Louis Poirot de Fontenay professionally, Fontenay also adopted the de Fontenay surname. The couple had two sons together: Ludovic (1954–1984) and Xavier (born 1961). Poirot died in 1981.

=== Political views ===
Fontenay had been outspoken about her political beliefs throughout her time as a public figure. Fontenay supported Arlette Laguiller of Lutte Ouvrière in the 2002 French presidential election, Ségolène Royal of the Socialist Party (PS) in the 2007 presidential election, and François Hollande of PS in the 2012 presidential election. She supported Emmanuel Macron in the 2017 presidential election, although she later became a critic of his. Fontenay described her voting history by saying "I have always voted for the left, except when I voted for Jacques Chirac against Le Pen," referring to the second round of the 2002 presidential election. She also initially supported the yellow vests protests, despite eventually opposing the movement due to disruptions to traffic.

Despite her support for left-wing politics, Fontenay had also been outspoken as a social conservative. In 2016, she publicly came out against LGBT parenting, surrogacy, and assisted reproductive technology for same-sex couples, and joined the La Manif pour tous movement campaigning against same-sex marriage in France. In April 2018, she criticized the "anti-social policy" of Macron by joining an initiative led by Florian Philippot of the far-right The Patriots political party, despite later distancing herself from Philippot. In 2019, when Sylvie Tellier stated that she "would not oppose" transgender women taking part in Miss France, Fontenay referred to the idea as "against nature" and "dishonorable," and that it would "dirty the title of Miss France."

=== Death ===
On 2 August 2023, Fontenay's son announced that she had died in her sleep of cardiac arrest on the night of 1 August, at her Saint-Cloud home. She was 90. She had been growing weak in the time prior to her death, and spent her last moments with her brother and granddaughter.
