= Valérie Bègue =

French beauty pageant titleholder

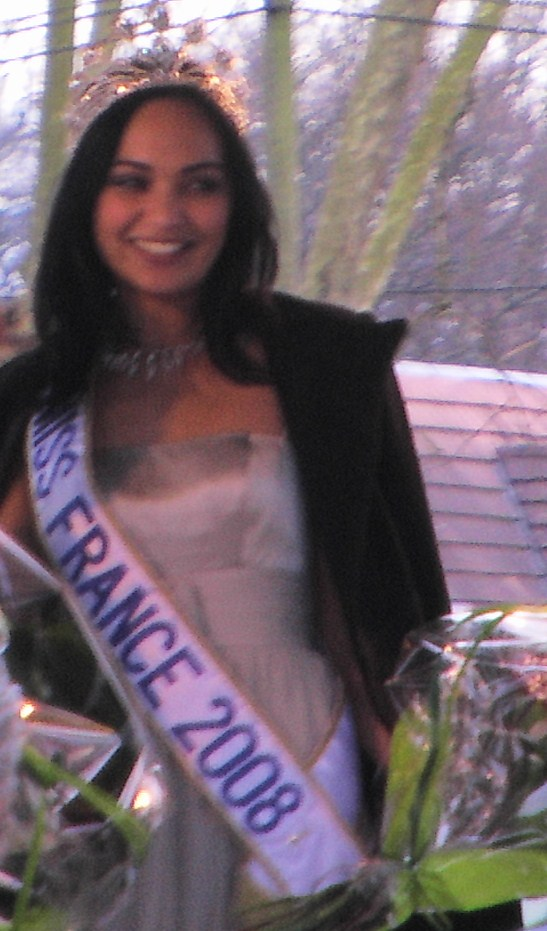
- Born: 26 September 1985 (age 41); Saint-Pierre, Réunion, France
- Height: 1.74 m (5 ft 9 in)
- Spouse: Camille Lacourt (m. 2013–2016)
- Beauty pageant titleholder
- Title: Miss France 2008; Miss Réunion 2007
- Hair color: Black
- Eye color: Amber

Valérie Bègue (born 26 September 1985) is a French reality television personality and beauty pageant titleholder who won Miss France 2008, representing Réunion island, an overseas department of France located in the Indian Ocean. Bègue is the first Miss France from Réunion island since Monique Uldaric, who was elected in 1976.

== Miss France controversy ==
Two weeks after she was crowned Miss France, pictures of Bègue taken before her election, fully clothed but in suggestive poses on rather tame pictures, were released by French tabloid "Entrevue". The President of the Miss France contest, Geneviève de Fontenay, went on French radio to insist that Valérie Bègue should step down and return her crown, or that she would be forcibly disqualified. Fontenay told reporters that if Endemol, the production company which owns the Miss France contest, disagreed with her decision, she would stand down as president.

On a previous occasion, Fontenay had obtained the temporary suspension of Miss France 2004, Lætitia Bléger, for much more suggestive pictures published in the French edition of Playboy magazine, as a Miss France winner is contractually obligated not to pose for controversial pictures for five years after winning the title and an entrant in the Miss France contest must state that she has never posed for nude or partially nude pictures beforehand.

Valérie Bègue took some time to reflect on her decision, and finally decided that she would not stand down voluntarily, explaining that the set of pictures in question were test shots and that she had not authorized their publication. Fontenay was accused of racism and of not wanting a non-French Miss France, after she said that Bègue should stay in Réunion. A public apology was then demanded by people from the island, including a member of the ruling Union for a Popular Movement.

On 28 December 2007, Fontenay announced that Bègue would be allowed to remain as Miss France 2008, as long as she did not take part in any international contests. Fontenay said she had based this position on the fact that the general public, who had helped to choose Bègue as Miss France, had no idea these pictures existed, and that their existence barred Bègue from international competitions, arguing that she did not want such pictures to give a false image of France.

Bègue's first runner-up was Vahinerii Requillart, who represented the island of New Caledonia, another overseas territory of France, which is located in the Pacific Ocean. As a result, the top two finalists of the 2008 Miss France pageant originated from overseas departments of France.

== Other work ==
Valérie Bègue is involved in programmes against breast cancer and genetic diseases.

In 2011, Valérie Bègue was a contestant on the second season of Danse avec les stars – the French version of Dancing with the Stars. She was partnered with professional dancer Grégory Guichard. On October 22, 2011, they were eliminated finishing 7th out of 9 contestants.

== Personal life ==
Bègue was married to Camille Lacourt, a French Olympic swimmer, in August 2013. She has a daughter with him, born in 2012. Lacourt and Bègue divorced in 2016.

== Filmography ==
Year	Title	Role	Director	Notes
2009	Seconde chance	Pauline	Vincent Giovanni	TV series (4 episodes)

Awards and achievements
Preceded by (Picardy) Rachel Legrain-Trapani	Miss France; 2008	Succeeded by (Midi-Pyrénées) Chloé Mortaud
Preceded by Raïssa Boyer	Miss Réunion; 2007	Succeeded by Delphine Courteaud
