= Miss France 2015 =

Camille Cerf, the 85th Miss France

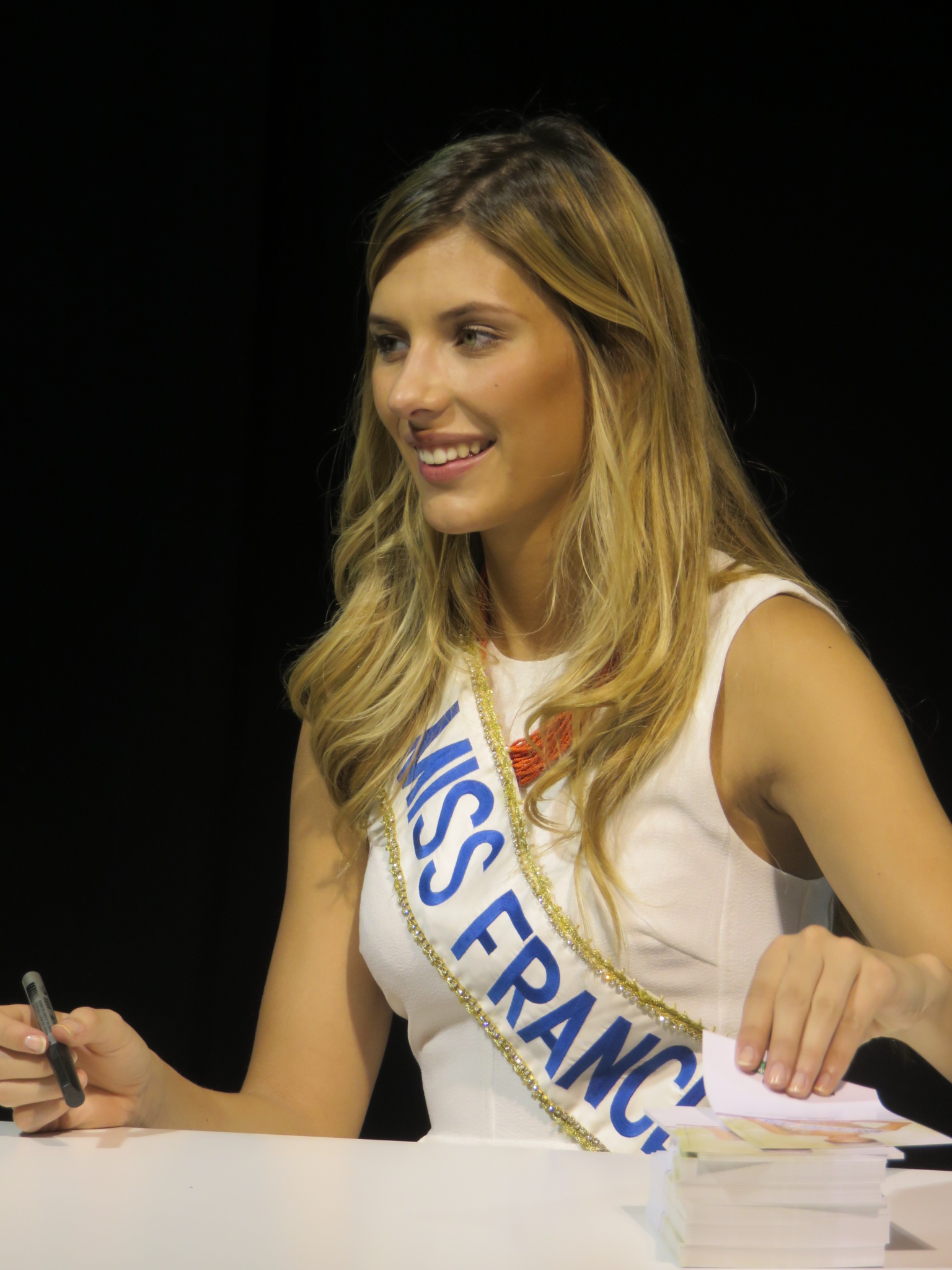
- Camille Cerf, Miss France 2015.
- Date: December 6, 2014
- Presenters: Jean-Pierre Foucault, Sylvie Tellier, Flora Coquerel
- Venue: Zénith d'Orléans, Orléans
- Broadcaster: TF1
- Entrants: 33
- Placements: 12
- Withdrawals: Miss St. Pierre & Miquelon
- Returns: Miss St. Martin
- Winner: Camille Cerf; Nord-Pas-de-Calais
- Congeniality: Chloé Mozar; Guadeloupe
- Photogenic: Marie Fabre; Languedoc

Miss France 2015, the 85th edition of the Miss France pageant, was held on December 6, 2014 at Zénith d'Orléans in Orléans. Miss France 2014, Flora Coquerel of Orléanais (Centre-Val de Loire) crowned her successor Camille Cerf of Nord-Pas-de-Calais at the end of the event. She represented France at Miss Universe 2014. It was the first time that the pageant took place in Orléans and the third time in the Centre-Val de Loire region.

The ceremony was held at TF1, and was presented by Jean-Pierre Foucault and the national director Sylvie Tellier.

The winner was Miss Nord-Pas-de-Calais, Camille Cerf, who gave to her region its first ever Miss France title.

== Results ==
=== Placements ===
Placement	Contestant
Miss France 2015	Nord-Pas-de-Calais – Camille Cerf
1st Runner-Up	Tahiti – Hinarere Taputu
2nd Runner-Up	Côte d'Azur – Charlotte Pirroni
3rd Runner-Up	Aquitaine – Malaurie Eugénie
4th Runner-Up	Alsace– Alyssa Wurtz
Top 12	Picardy – Adeline Legris-Croisel (5th Runner-Up); New Caledonia – Mondy Laigle (6th Runner-Up); Centre – Amanda Xeres; Guadeloupe – Chloé Mozar; Île-de-France – Margaux Savarit; Provence – Anne-Laure Fourmont; Roussillon – Cheana Vila Real Coimbra

== Special prizes ==
Prize	Contestant
Prize of General Knowledge	Île-de-France – Margaux Savarit (19,5/20)
Prize of Hospitality	Normandy – Estrella Ramirez
Prize "Best regional costume"	Franche-Comté – Anne-Mathilde Cali
Prize of Congeniality	Guadeloupe – Chloé Mozar
Prize "Miss Photogenic"	Languedoc – Marie Fabre

== Judges ==
The names of the judges were announced on November, 24.:.

Judge		Notes
Patrick Bruel	Patrick Bruel (president)	Singer and actor.
	Philippe Bas	Actor.
	Valérie Bègue	Miss France 2008.
Stéphane Rousseau	Stéphane Rousseau	Humorist and actor.
Laure Manaudou	Laure Manaudou	Swimmer and olympian at 2004 Summer Olympics.
Jean-Luc Reichmann	Jean-Luc Reichmann	TV host and productor.
	Shy'm	Singer, dancer and winner of the 2nd season of Danse avec les stars

== Contestants ==
Region	Name	Age	Height	Hometown	Elected on
Alsace	Alyssa Wurtz	24	175 cm (5 ft 9 in)	Drusenheim	June, 20 in Colmar
Aquitaine	Malaurie Eugénie	20	176 cm (5 ft 9 1/2 in)	Biganos	October, 11 in Hagetmau
Auvergne	Morgane Laporte	20	176 cm (5 ft 9 1/2 in)	Terjat	September, 13 in Bellerive-sur-Allier
Brittany	Maïlys Bonnet	20	177 cm (5 ft 9 1/2 in)	Lesconil	September, 27 in Damgan
Burgundy	Janyce Guillot	20	182 cm (5 ft 11 1/2 in)	Bruailles	October, 11 in Châlon-sur-Saône
Centre	Amanda Xeres	18	175 cm (5 ft 9 in)	Saint-Doulchard	October, 4 in Déols
Champagne-Ardenne	Mélissa Cervoni	20	177 cm (5 ft 9 1/2 in)	Vanault-les-Dames	October, 10 in Saint-Dizier
Corsica	Dorine Rossi	19	183 cm (6 ft 0 in)	Porto-Vecchio	August, 31 in Grosseto-Prugna
Côte d'Azur	Charlotte Pirroni	21	170 cm (5 ft 7 in)	Roquebrune-Cap-Martin	August, 3 in Mougins
Franche-Comté	Anne-Mathilde Cali	24	173 cm (5 ft 8 in)	Besançon	October, 18 in Port-sur-Saône
French Guiana	Valeria Coelho Maciel	19	171 cm (5 ft 7 1/2 in)	Kourou	October, 11 in Cayenne
Guadeloupe	Chloé Mozar	19	180 cm (5 ft 11 in)	Les Abymes	July, 26 in Les Abymes
Île-de-France	Margaux Savarit	23	176 cm (5 ft 9 1/2 in)	Paris	September, 13 in Évry
Languedoc	Marie Fabre	22	170 cm (5 ft 7 in)	Montpellier	August, 2 in Mauguio
Limousin	Léa Froidefond	19	172 cm (5 ft 7 1/2 in)	Allassac	October, 3 in Limoges
Lorraine	Charlène Lallemand	18	174 cm (5 ft 8 1/2 in)	Chantraine	October, 18 in Yutz
Martinique	Moëra Michalon	20	170 cm (5 ft 7 in)	Le Marigot	July, 25 in Les Trois-Îlets
Mayotte	Ludy Langlade	18	176 cm (5 ft 9 1/2 in)	Chirongui	August, 30 in Mamoudzou
Midi-Pyrénées	Laura Pelos	24	180 cm (5 ft 11 in)	Urdens	October, 10 in Beaumont-de-Lomagne
New Caledonia	Mondy Laigle	20	171 cm (5 ft 7 1/2 in)	Nouméa	August, 23 in Mont-Dore
Nord-Pas-de-Calais	Camille Cerf	19	180 cm (5 ft 11 in)	Coulogne	October, 25 in Saint-Amand-les-Eaux
Normandy	Estrella Ramirez	24	171 cm (5 ft 7 1/2 in)	Sées	September, 26 in Coutances
Orléanais	Solène Salmagne	19	175 cm (5 ft 9 in)	Nogent-le-Roi	October, 5 in Montargis
Pays de Loire	Flavy Facon	21	176 cm (5 ft 9 1/2 in)	Brain-sur-Allonnes	September, 20 in Chantonnay
Pays de Savoie	Aurore Péron	18	176 cm (5 ft 9 1/2 in)	Saint-Jean-de-Maurienne	October, 19 in Cluses
Picardy	Adeline Legris-Croisel	21	177 cm (5 ft 9 1/2 in)	Amiens	October, 26 in Beauvais
Poitou-Charentes	Mathilde Hubert	19	173 cm (5 ft 8 in)	Cherves-Richemont	September, 19 in Buxerolles
Provence	Anne-Laure Fourmont	21	174 cm (5 ft 8 1/2 in)	Toulon	September, 5 in Gémenos
Réunion	Ingreed Mercredi	19	171 cm (5 ft 7 1/2 in)	Saint-Paul	June, 27 in Saint-Denis
Rhône-Alpes	Aurore Thibaud	20	173 cm (5 ft 8 in)	Fontaine	October, 26 in Villefranche-sur-Saône
Roussillon	Chena Vila Real Coimbra	20	170 cm (5 ft 7 in)	Perpignan	August, 10 in Le Barcarès
Saint Martin	Nadika Matthew-Gauthier	19	172 cm (5 ft 7 1/2 in)	Grand Case	July, 27 in Grand Case
Tahiti	Hinarere Taputu	24	174 cm (5 ft 8 1/2 in)	Rurutu	June, 28 in Papeete

== Notes about the placements ==
- Nord-Pas-de-Calais wins for the first time ever the Miss France pageant.
- Côte d'Azur and Provence are placed for sixth consecutive year.
- Roussillon is placed for the fifth consecutive year.
- Tahiti is placed for the third consecutive year as first runner-up.
- Alsace and Guadeloupe are placed for the second consecutive year.
- Nord-Pas-de-Calais and Picardy are placed for the first time since the Miss France 2013 pageant.
- Île-de-France is placed for the first time since the Miss France 2011 pageant.
- New Caledonia is placed for the first time since the Miss France 2008 pageant.
- Aquitaine is placed for the first time since the Miss France 2007 pageant.
- Centre is placed for the first time.

== Crossovers ==
Contestants who previously competed or will be competing at international beauty pageants:

Miss Universe

- 2014: Nord-Pas-de-Calais – Camille Cerf (Top 15)
  - (Miami, United States)

Miss World

- 2015: Tahiti – Hinarere Taputu (Top 11)
  - (Sanya, China)

Miss International

- 2015: Côte d'Azur – Charlotte Pironni (Unplaced)
  - (Tokyo, Japan)

Miss Earth

- 2015: Alsace – Alyssa Wurtz (Top 16)
  - (Vienna, Austria)
