= Miss France 2013 =

Beauty pageant

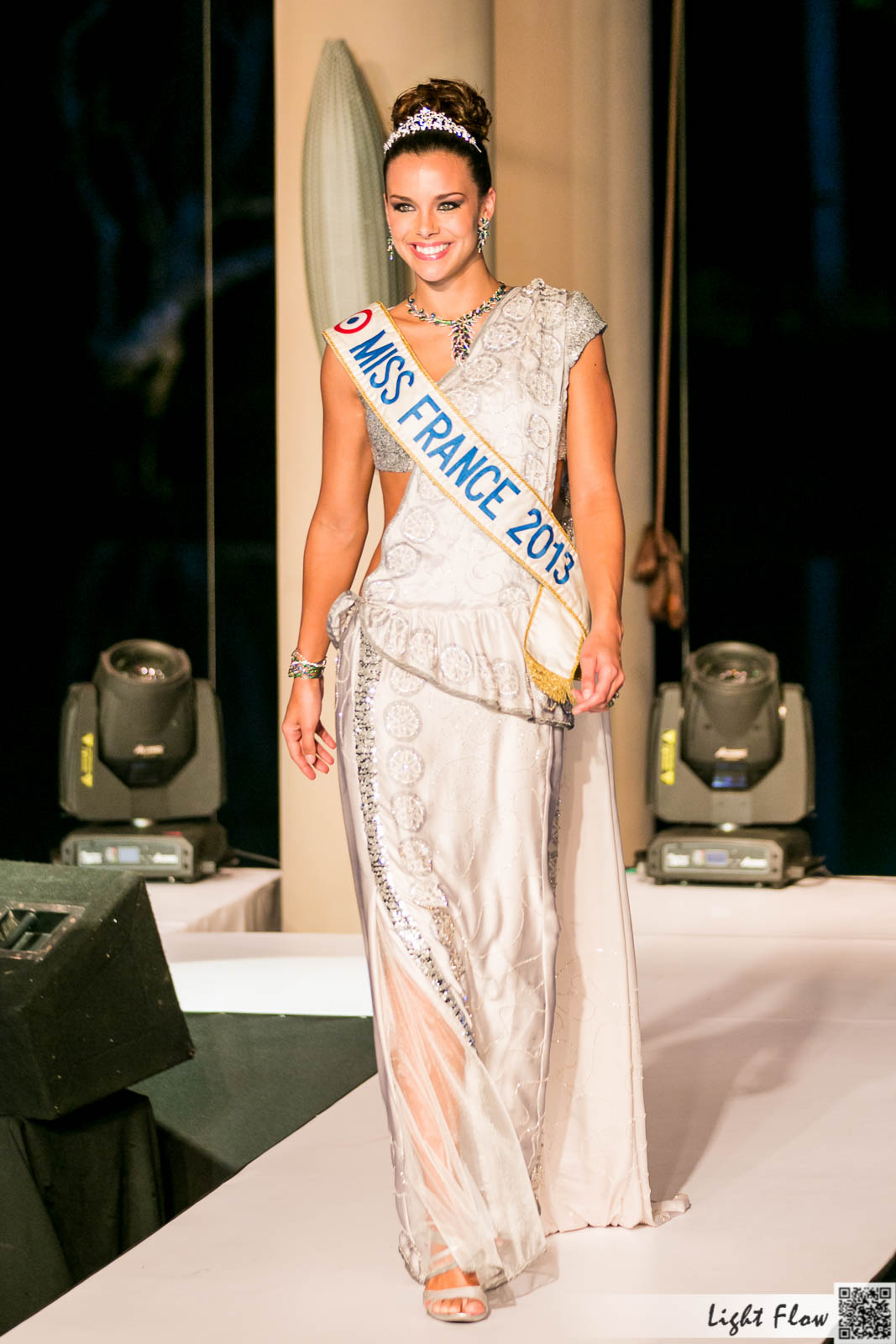
- Date: 8 December 2012
- Presenters: Jean-Pierre Foucault, Sylvie Tellier
- Venue: Zénith de Limoges, Limoges, France
- Broadcaster: TF1
- Entrants: 33
- Placements: 12
- Debuts: Saint-Martin
- Withdrawals: St-Pierre-et-Miquelon
- Winner: Marine Lorphelin; Burgundy
- Congeniality: Pauline Llorca; Normandy
- Photogenic: Emmanuelle Fabre; Languedoc

Miss France 2013 was the 83rd Miss France pageant, held in Limoges on 8 December 2012. Miss France 2012, Delphine Wespiser of Alsace crowned her successor Marine Lorphelin of Burgundy at the end of the event.

It was the first time that the pageant took place in Limoges and in the Limousin region.

It was presented by the national director Sylvie Tellier and Jean-Pierre Foucault for the 18th consecutive year. The event was broadcast live by TF1.

The winner was Miss Burgundy, Marine Lorphelin, who gave to her region its second Miss France title.

== Results ==
=== Placements ===
Placement	Contestant
Miss France 2013	Burgundy – Marine Lorphelin
1st Runner-Up	Tahiti – Hinarani de Longeaux
2nd Runner-Up	Nord-Pas-de-Calais – Sophie Garénaux
3rd Runner-Up	Martinique – Camille René
4th Runner-Up	Pays de la Loire – Mélinda Paré
Top 12	Rhône-Alpes – Julie Jacquot (5th Runner-Up); Côte d'Azur – Charlotte Mint (6th Runner-Up); Champagne-Ardenne – Déborah Trichet; Provence – Marine Mahiques; Picardy – Émilie Mika; Brittany – Estelle Sabathier; Roussillon – Marilou Cubaynes

== Preparation ==
The 33 contestants, Delphine Wespiser and the national director Sylvie Tellier had travelled to Mauritius from November, 15 to November, 22. The rehearsals took place in Limoges.

== Contestants ==
Region	Name	Age	Height	Hometown	Elected	Placement
Alsace	Emilie Koenig	22	172 cm (5 ft 7 1/2 in)	Griesheim-près-Molsheim	June, 17 in Mutzig	
Aquitaine	Amélie Rigodanzo	20	177 cm (5 ft 9 1/2 in)	Seyches	October, 13 in Aiguillon	
Auvergne	Sanne Spangenberg	19	180 cm (5 ft 11 in)	Autry-Issards	October, 14 in Cébazat	
Bourgogne	Marine Lorphelin	19	177 cm (5 ft 9 1/2 in)	Charnay-lès-Mâcon	September, 29 in Autun	Winner
Brittany	Estelle Sabathier	21	174 cm (5 ft 8 1/2 in)	Brest	September, 15 in Pontivy	Top 12
Centre	Juliette Aquilina-Reis	21	172 cm (5 ft 7 1/2 in)	Saint-Amand-Montrond	October, 6 in Déols	
Champagne-Ardenne	Déborah Trichet	22	182 cm (5 ft 11 1/2 in)	Rethel	October, 5 in Sedan	Top 12
Corsica	Louise Robert	22	180 cm (5 ft 11 in)	Ajaccio	September, 1 in Grosseto-Prugna	
Côte d'Azur	Charlotte Mint	19	171 cm (5 ft 7 1/2 in)	Beausoleil	August, 2 in Cannet	6th Runner-Up
Franche-Comté	Charlène Michaut	24	172 cm (5 ft 7 1/2 in)	Allenjoie	October, 20 in Pontarlier	
French Guiana	Corinne Buzare	24	178 cm (5 ft 10 in)	Kourou	October, 6 in Cayenne	
Guadeloupe	Cynthia Tinédor	20	175 cm (5 ft 9 in)	Sainte-Rose	July, 28 in Le Gosier	
Île-de-France	Sabrina Benamara	18	173 cm (5 ft 8 in)	Paris	June, 18 in Paris	
Languedoc	Emmanuelle Fabre	22	173 cm (5 ft 8 in)	Gignac	August, 4 in Mauguio	
Limousin	Sandra Longeaud	23	172 cm (5 ft 7 1/2 in)	Harnes	September, 28 in Saint-Amand-les-Eaux	
Lorraine	Divanna Pljevalcic-Coignard	20	172 cm (5 ft 7 1/2 in)	Saint-Avold	October, 19 in Amnéville	
Martinique	Camille René	18	176 cm (5 ft 9 1/2 in)	Le Lamentin	July, 28 in Saint-Pierre	3rd Runner-Up
Mayotte	Stanisla Saïd	22	176 cm (5 ft 9 1/2 in)	Pamandzi	September, 1 in Mamoudzou	
Midi-Pyrénées	Célia Guermoudj	22	170 cm (5 ft 7 in)	Toulouse	October, 12 in Valence	
New Caledonia	Sandra Bergès	18	173 cm (5 ft 8 in)	Nouméa	September, 1 in Nouméa	
Nord-Pas-de-Calais	Sophie Garénaux	22	172 cm (5 ft 7 1/2 in)	Harnes	September, 28 in Saint-Amand-les-Eaux	2nd Runner-Up
Normandy	Pauline Llorca	24	171 cm (5 ft 7 1/2 in)	Beuvillers	September, 21 in Coutances	
Orléanais	Joy Lartigue	21	172 cm (5 ft 7 1/2 in)	Pierres	October, 7 in Montargis	
Pays de Loire	Mélinda Paré	18	176 cm (5 ft 9 1/2 in)	Le Lion-d'Angers	September, 14 in Le Lion-d'Angers	4th Runner-Up
Pays de Savoie	Graziella Byhet	24	177 cm (5 ft 9 1/2 in)	Veyrier-du-Lac	October, 26 in Chambéry	
Picardy	Émilie Mika	20	175 cm (5 ft 9 in)	Abbeville	October, 21 in Beauvais	Top 12
Poitou-Charentes	Typhanie Soulat	21	171 cm (5 ft 7 1/2 in)	Fontaine-le-Comte	September, 20 in Bressuire	
Provence	Marine Mahiques	19	176 cm (5 ft 9 1/2 in)	Seillans	August, 3 in Istres	Top 12
Réunion	Stéphanie Robert	21	172 cm (5 ft 7 1/2 in)	Saint-Paul	July, 13 in Saint-Denis	
Rhône-Alpes	Julie Jacquot	24	172 cm (5 ft 7 1/2 in)	Lyon	October, 27 in Genas	5th Runner-Up
Roussillon	Marilou Cubaynes	24	173 cm (5 ft 8 in)	Cabestany	August, 5 in Banyuls-sur-Mer	Top 12
Saint-Martin	Suzon Bonnet	22	174 cm (5 ft 8 1/2 in)	Marigot	October, 20 in Marigot	
Tahiti	Hinarani de Longeaux	22	177 cm (5 ft 9 1/2 in)	Hitiaa O Te Ra	June, 23 in Papeete	1st Runner-Up

== Special prizes ==
Prize	Contestant
Prize of General Knowledge	Burgundy – Marine Lorphelin (17/20)
Prize of Congeniality	Normandy - Pauline Llorca
Prize "Miss Photogenic"	Languedoc - Emmanuelle Fabre

== Judges ==
Member
Alain Delon (president)	Actor
Mireille Darc	Actress
Nikos Aliagas	Television presenter
Frédéric Diefenthal	Actor
Adriana Karembeu	Model
Camille Muffat	Swimmer
Alexandra Rosenfeld	Miss France 2006

== Crossovers ==
Contestants who previously competed or will be competing at international beauty pageants:

Miss World

- 2013: Burgundy – Marine Lorphelin (1st Runner-Up)
  - (Bali, Indonesia)

Miss Universe

- 2013: Tahiti – Hinarani de Longeaux
  - (Moscow, Russia)

Miss Earth

- 2013: Nord-Pas-de-Calais – Sophie Garénaux (Top 16)
  - (Muntinlupa, Philippines)

Miss Supranational

- 2013: Martinique – Camille René
  - (Minsk, Belarus)
