= Hinarani de Longeaux =

French model

- Born: 12 June 1990 (age 36); Papeete, French Polynesia
- Height: 1.77 m (5 ft 10 in)
- Children: 2
- Beauty pageant titleholder
- Title: Miss Tahiti 2012; Miss Universe France 2013
- Hair color: Brown
- Eye color: Green
- Major competitions: Miss France 2013 (1st Runner-Up); Miss Universe 2013 (Unplaced)

Hinarani de Longeaux (born 12 June 1990) is a French model and beauty pageant titleholder who was crowned Miss Tahiti 2012. As Miss Tahiti, de Longeaux competed at Miss France 2013, placing as the first runner-up. Afterwards, she was appointed Miss Universe France 2013, and represented France at Miss Universe 2013.

== Early life ==
De Longeaux was born in Papeete on the island of Tahiti in French Polynesia to parents Xavier de Longeaux and Maïma Hunter. On her paternal side, her family originates in Lorraine, and was ennobled in 1698 during the reign of Louis XIV; they are one of the few remaining noble families in France.

In 2007, she began her modeling career after winning a model search competition hosted by Marilyn Agency. Afterwards, she moved to Paris and began modeling internationally. De Longeaux later returned to French Polynesia and became an executive assistant at the online travel agency EASYTahiti.

== Pageantry ==
=== Miss Tahiti 2012 ===
De Longeaux began her pageantry career in 2012, after being selected as a contestant in Miss Tahiti 2012. The final of the competition was held in Papeete on 23 June 2012, where de Longeaux went on to win the crown. As Miss Tahiti, de Longeaux also received the right to represent French Polynesia at Miss France 2013.

Miss France 2013 was held on 8 December 2012 at the Zénith Limoges Métropole in Limoges. During the finals, de Longeaux advanced from the initial pool of thirty-three contestants into the top twelve, and later the top five as well, receiving the highest score from the voting public amongst the top twelve. In the top five, de Longeaux went on to place as the first runner-up, behind winner Marine Lorphelin of Burgundy.

=== Miss Universe France 2013 ===
After placing as the first runner-up at Miss France, de Longeaux was appointed Miss Universe France 2013, giving her the opportunity to represent France at Miss Universe 2013. Miss Universe was later held on 9 November 2013 in Moscow, but was unplaced, officially ending the France's four-year streak of consecutive placements in Miss Universe, from 2009 through 2012. Gabriela Isler of Venezuela won the said pageant. She was later succeeded as Miss Universe France by Camille Cerf, the winner of Miss France 2015.

== Personal life ==
In 2014, the media revealed that de Longeaux was in a relationship with French professional surfer Jérémy Florès. They have two children together.

Awards and achievements
Preceded by Rauata Temauri	Miss Tahiti; 2012	Succeeded by Mehiata Riaria
Preceded by (Réunion) Marie Payet	Miss Universe France; 2013	Succeeded by (Nord-Pas-de-Calais) Camille Cerf
