= Miss France 2014 =

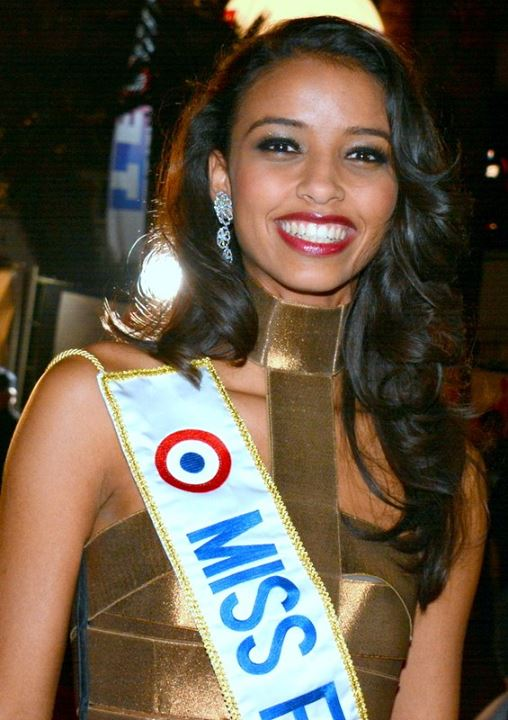
- Flora Coquerel, Miss France 2014
- Date: 13 December 2013
- Presenters: Jean-Pierre Foucault, Sylvie Tellier
- Venue: Zénith de Dijon, Dijon, France
- Broadcaster: TF1
- Entrants: 33
- Placements: 12
- Withdrawals: Saint-Martin
- Returns: St-Pierre-et-Miquelon
- Winner: Flora Coquerel; Orléanais
- Congeniality: Daniati Yves; Mayotte
- Photogenic: Laetitia Vuillemard; Île-de-France

Miss France 2014 was the 84th Miss France pageant, held in Dijon on 13 December 2013. Miss France 2013, Marine Lorphelin of Burgundy crowned her successor Flora Coquerel of Orléanais (now Centre-Val de Loire) at the end of the event.

It was the first time that the pageant took place in Dijon and in the Burgundy region.

The theme of the event was "Disney", it was presented by the national director Sylvie Tellier and Jean-Pierre Foucault for the 19st consecutive year. The event was broadcast live by TF1.

The winner was Miss Orléanais, Flora Coquerel, who gave to her region its first ever Miss France title.

== Results ==
=== Placements ===
Placement	Contestant
Miss France 2014	Orléanais – Flora Coquerel
1st Runner-Up	Tahiti – Mehiata Riaria
2nd Runner-Up	Provence – Laëtizia Penmellen
3rd Runner-Up	Côte d'Azur – Aurianne Sinacola
4th Runner-Up	Guadeloupe – Chloé Deher
Top 12	Auvergne – Camille Blond (5th Runner-Up); Languedoc – Anaïs Franchini (6th Runner-Up); Alsace – Laura Strubel; Burgundy – Marie Reintz; Franche-Comté – Camille Duban; Réunion – Vanille M'Doihoma; Roussillon – Sabine Banet

== Preparation ==
The 33 contestants, Marine Lorphelin and the national director Sylvie Tellier had travelled to Sri Lanka from November, 16 to November, 23. The rehearsals took place in Dijon.

== Contestants ==
Region	Name	Age	Height	Hometown	Elected	Placement
Alsace	Laura Strubel	24	182 cm (5 ft 11 1/2 in)	Urmatt	June, 21 in Colmar	Top 12
Aquitaine	Camille Gafa	22	177 cm (5 ft 9 1/2 in)	Bordeaux	October, 12 in Mios	
Auvergne	Camille Blond	18	171 cm (5 ft 7 1/2 in)	Moulins-sur-Allier	October, 13 in Cébazat	5th Runner-Up
Bourgogne	Marie Reintz	22	179 cm (5 ft 10 1/2 in)	Bligny-lès-Beaune	October, 20 in Autun	Top 12
Brittany	Marie Chartier	19	171 cm (5 ft 7 1/2 in)	Étables-sur-Mer	October, 13 in Gourin	
Centre	Laure Moreau	20	180 cm (5 ft 11 in)	Saint-Maur	October, 5 in Déols	
Champagne-Ardenne	Louise Bataille	18	178 cm (5 ft 10 in)	Reims	September, 26 in Sedan	
Corsica	Cécilia Napoli	19	171 cm (5 ft 7 1/2 in)	Bastia	August, 26 in Ajaccio	
Côte d'Azur	Aurianne Sinacola	19	175 cm (5 ft 9 in)	Vallauris	August, 3 in Vallauris	3rd Runner-Up
Franche-Comté	Camille Duban	19	173 cm (5 ft 8 in)	Gray	October, 18 in Belfort	Top 12
French Guiana	Henriette Groeneveldt	20	175 cm (5 ft 9 in)	Remire-Montjoly	October, 12 in Cayenne	
Guadeloupe	Chloé Deher	18	177 cm (5 ft 9 1/2 in)	Îles des Saintes	July, 27 in Petit-Bourg	4th Runner-Up
Île-de-France	Laëtitia Vuillemard	20	173 cm (5 ft 8 in)	Saint-Germain-lès-Corbeil	June, 26 in Paris	
Languedoc	Anaïs Franchini	22	175 cm (5 ft 9 in)	Montpellier	August, 1st in Carnon	6th Runner-Up
Limousin	Caroline Dubreuil	21	177 cm (5 ft 9 1/2 in)	Limoges	October, 12 in Limoges	
Lorraine	Charline Keck	19	179 cm (5 ft 10 1/2 in)	Vigy	October, 19 in Yutz	
Martinique	Nathalie Frédal	19	175 cm (5 ft 9 in)	Gros-Morne	September, 27 in Fort-de-France	
Mayotte	Daniati Yves	24	170 cm (5 ft 7 in)	Tsingoni	August, 31 in Mamoudzou	
Midi-Pyrénées	Audrey Bernes	20	181 cm (5 ft 11 1/2 in)	Toulouse	October, 11 in Castelsarrasin	
New Caledonia	Agnès Latchimy	22	171 cm (5 ft 7 1/2 in)	Nouméa	August, 3 in Nouméa	
Nord-Pas-de-Calais	Gaëlle Mans	23	180 cm (5 ft 11 in)	Sains-en-Gohelle	October, 25 in Saint-Amand-les-Eaux	
Normandy	Ophélie Genest	19	172 cm (5 ft 7 1/2 in)	Caen	September, 14 in Coutances	
Orléanais	Flora Coquerel	19	182 cm (5 ft 11 1/2 in)	Morancez	October, 6 in Montargis	Winner
Pays de Loire	Marie Plessis	22	173 cm (5 ft 8 in)	Rochefort-sur-Loire	September, 21 in Olonne-sur-Mer	
Pays de Savoie	Julie Legros	22	170 cm (5 ft 7 in)	Aiton	October, 19 in Grand-Bornand	
Picardy	Manon Beurey	19	175 cm (5 ft 9 in)	Argœuves	October, 27 in Beauvais	
Poitou-Charentes	Laura Pierre	19	174 cm (5 ft 8 1/2 in)	Le Gua	September, 20 in Buxerolles	
Provence	Laëtizia Penmellen	19	171 cm (5 ft 7 1/2 in)	Villecroze	August, 2 in Istres	2nd Runner-Up
Réunion	Vanille M'Doihoma	21	175 cm (5 ft 9 in)	Le Tampon	August, 17 in Saint-Denis	Top 12
Rhône-Alpes	Mylène Angelier	22	177 cm (5 ft 9 1/2 in)	Sarcey	October, 27 in Châteauneuf-sur-Isère	
Roussillon	Sabine Banet	21	174 cm (5 ft 8 1/2 in)	Saleilles	August, 11 in Le Barcarès	Top 12
Saint-Pierre-et-Miquelon	Clio Victorri	23	173 cm (5 ft 8 in)	Saint-Pierre	July, 5 in Saint-Pierre	
Tahiti	Mehiata Riaria	22	177 cm (5 ft 9 1/2 in)	Papeete	June, 19 in Papeete	1st Runner-Up

== Special prizes ==
Prize	Contestant
Prize of General Knowledge	Alsace – Laura Strubel (18/20)
Miss « Cinnamon Hospitality 2014 »	Côte d'Azur - Aurianne Sinacola
Prize of Hospitality	Nord-Pas-de-Calais - Gaëlle Mans
Prize of Congeniality	Mayotte - Daniati Yves
Prize "Miss Photogenic"	Île-de-France - Laetitia Vuillemard

== Judges ==
Member
Garou (president)	Singer
Élodie Frégé	Singer
Nathalie Marquay	Miss France 1987
Vincent Niclo	Singer
Jean-Pierre Pernaut	Television presenter
Titoff	Humorist
Sylvie Vartan	Singer

== Crossovers ==
Contestants who previously competed or will be competing at international beauty pageants:

Miss Universe

- 2015: Orléanais – Flora Coquerel (Top 5)
  - (Las Vegas, United States)
- 2026: Guadeloupe Guadeloupe - Chloé Deher (TBA)
  - (San Juan, Puerto Rico)
  - Guadeloupe's representative

Miss World

- 2014: Orléanais – Flora Coquerel
  - (London, United Kingdom)

Miss International

- 2014: Côte d'Azur – Aurianne Sinacola
  - (Tokyo, Japan)

Miss Earth

- 2014: Provence – Laëtizia Penmellen
  - (Manila, Philippines)
