= Sophie Garénaux =

French beauty pageant titleholder and model

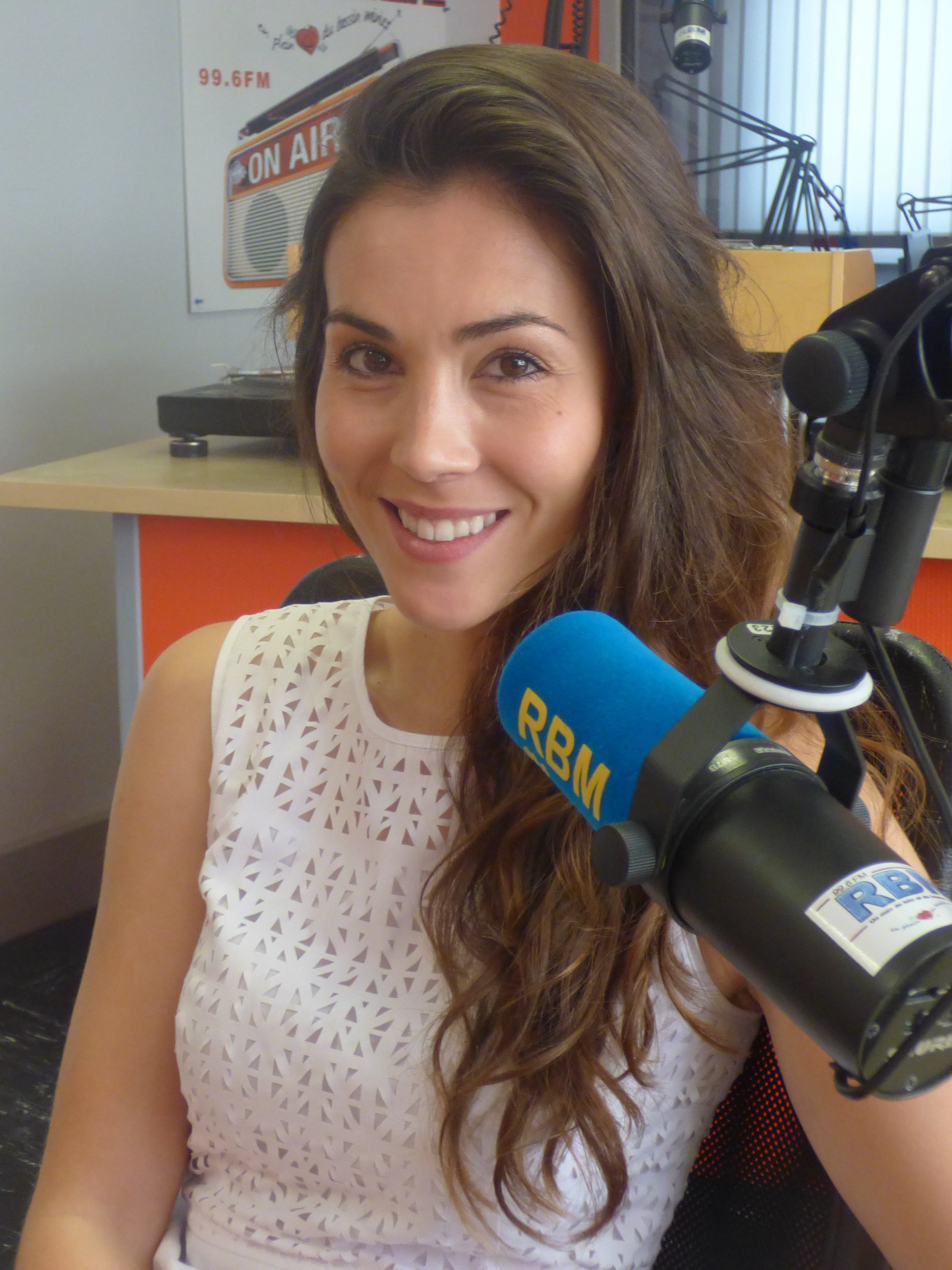
- Garénaux in 2019
- Born: 1990 or 1991 (age 34–35); Harnes, Nord Pas de Calais, France
- Height: 1.72 m (5 ft 8 in)
- Beauty pageant titleholder
- Title: Miss Nord-Pas-de-Calais 2012; Miss Earth France 2013
- Major competitions: Miss France 2013 (2nd Runner-Up); Miss Earth 2013 (Top 16)

Sophie Garénaux (born 1990 or 1991) is a French beauty pageant titleholder and model who was crowned as Miss France 2013 second runner-up and was selected to be France's representative in Miss Earth 2013. She is the first Miss Earth delegate from Miss France Organization headed by Sylvie Tellier. She became Miss Liévin and Miss Nord-Pas-de-calais in 2012.

== Biography ==
=== Early life ===
According to Miss Earth's official website, Sophie describes her childhood as "very fulfilling, punctuated by school year, sport (swimming mostly) and my passion for nature." She also said that she has a "very rewarding family life". Sophie also learned to dance and do theater. She cites yachting as her favorite sport.

Sophie became a member of an organization called "Nature Club" for eight years where she experienced teaching kids about flora and fauna. Aside from teaching, she was able to experience "drill, parks, beaches, nature reserves, wildlife parks and aquatic centers" monthly. She also mentions, "In addition, we have a Center of studies with over 70 animal races, and a large outdoor farm allowing us to gain experience in real contact of the animal world." Because of her involvement in the organization, she became more aware of the environmental problems. They participated in various coastal clean-ups along the beaches of northern France, along with touring in different places for waste management and recycling.

She has learned about "respect, education, meaning of work, discipline, patience and love and appreciation for nature that sustains us" during her childhood days.

=== Miss France 2013 ===
Sophie decided to join the 2013 edition of Miss France and represented her region, Nord-Pas-de-Calais. At the conclusion of the pageant, she was placed as the second runner-up.

The national pageant of France was won by Marine Lorphelin who is France's representative for Miss World 2013 in Indonesia.

=== Miss Earth 2013 ===
"Water is to the Earth what blood is to human beings: Life."

— Sophie Garenaux's message for Miss Earth.

Being selected as Miss Earth France 2013, Sophie flew to the Philippines to participate in Miss Earth 2013 and tried to be Tereza Fajksová's successor.

As a Miss Earth delegate, an environmental advocacy is a must. Based from Miss Earth's website, Sophie's advocacy focuses on water pollution. She mentions "industry, agriculture, waste-water and automobile oil spills" as several factors that contributes to the effects of water pollution. She chooses water pollution because "...it is a major cause of human, animal and plant mortality on a massive scale. Since the late twentieth century, with the use of plastics mainly glass and stainless very poorly degradable, the impact of marine human waste has become increasingly important ! ! Various studies have now found plastic particles in the oceans of the world and at all depths : 100 million tons of plastic waste are scattered in the world's oceans." She said that, "The fight against pollution is difficult, because what is at the bottom or diluted in water is often invisible. In addition, some toxic infiltrated into the ground often produce their effects after a long time! However, we can act!! As we see, the plastic is the material that occupies most of the waste found at sea and eliminate waste, it must first collect."

Aside from water pollution, Sophie also mentions degassing, desludging and waste management. Sophie mentions Guadeloupe, a French territory, to be a victim of waste management.

Sophie also adds that if she became the Miss Earth winner, she will be able to carry out her plans on a global scale where she can contribute for the future.

When asked what she can promote about her country, she answered, "My country is a widespread erstwhile country which belongs to the European community, so we have a huge cultural heritage. Also, as we are a developed country it is very difficult to promote one thing rather than another, but as I'm a little greedy and French, allow I first mention our French gastronomy."

During Miss Earth 2013, Sophie won a bronze medal for the "Resorts Wear Competition" as part of the preliminary activities of Miss Earth 2013. During the finals night, Sophie was declared as part of the Top 16 semi-finalists. However, she was not able to penetrate further. Alyz Henrich of Venezuela was declared as the winner.

Awards and achievements
Preceded by Mathilde Florin (2011)	Miss Earth France; 2013	Succeeded by (Provence) Laëtizia Penmellen
Preceded by (Réunion) Marie Payet	Miss France 2nd Runner-Up; 2013	Succeeded by (Provence) Laëtizia Penmellen
Preceded by Sophie Martin	Miss Nord Pas de Calais; 2012	Succeeded by Gaëlle Mans
