= Mister International Azerbaijan =

- Formation: 2014
- Type: Beauty Pageant
- Headquarters: Baku
- Location: Azerbaijan
- Members: Mister International
- Official language: Azerbaijani
- National Director: Zamir Hüseynov
- Website: Official website

Mister International Azerbaijan (Mister International Azerbaycan) is a national male beauty pageant in Azerbaijan. The grand winner will represent the country at the Mister International pageant. This pageant unrelated to Miss Azerbaijan or Mister Azerbaijan.

== Pageant ==
The Mister International Azerbaijan has been independent pageant since 2014. It is in under Zamir Hüseynov management in Baku, Azerbaijan. The winner expected to be role model of Azerbaijan and become an ambassador for Azerbaijan in Mister International.

== Titleholders ==
Year	Mister Azerbaijan	Hometown	Placement	Special Awards	Notes
2010	Elnur Tagiev	Baku	Unplaced		Closed Election
2014	Ali Zahirli	Baku	Unplaced		
2015	Nihad Quliyev	Baku	Withdrew		
