= Kristina Karjalainen =

Estonian-Finnish beauty queen (born 1989)

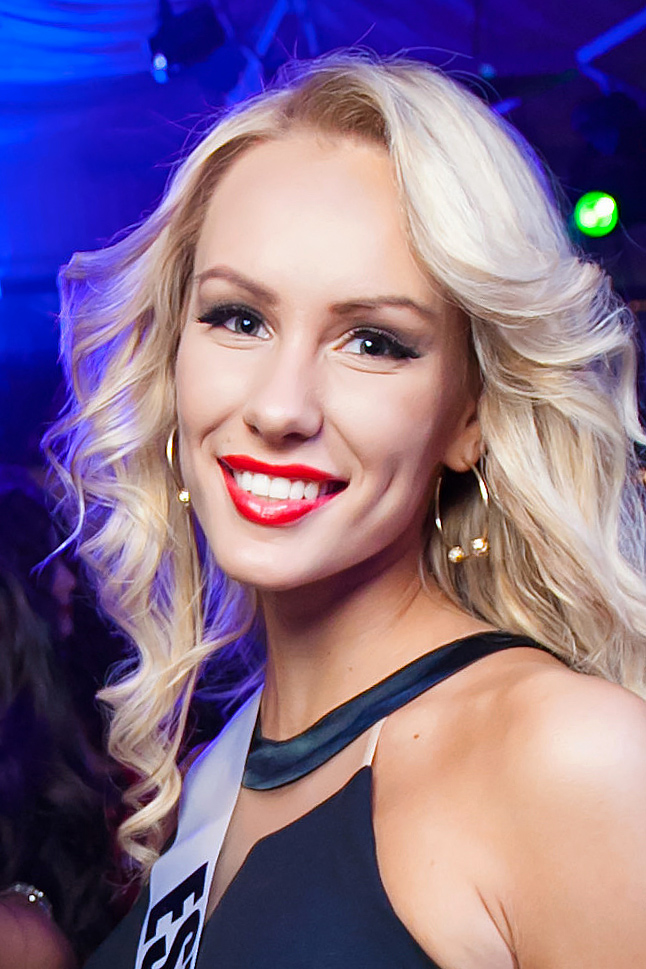
- Born: Kristina Karjalainen; 15 August 1989 (age 37); Tallinn, then part of Estonian SSR, Soviet Union
- Height: 1.81 m (5 ft 11 1/2 in)
- Beauty pageant titleholder
- Title: Miss Globe Finland 2012; Miss Tallinn 2013; Eesti Miss Estonia 2013
- Hair color: Blonde
- Eye color: Green
- Major competitions: Miss Globe International 2012 (Top 5, "Miss Golden Girl"); Eesti Miss Estonia 2013 (Winner); Miss Universe 2013 (Unplaced)

Kristina Karjalainen (born 15 August 1989) is an Estonian-Finnish model and beauty pageant titleholder who won Eesti Miss Estonia 2013 and represented her country at Miss Universe 2013 in Moscow, Russia but unplaced.

== Early life ==
Karjalainen is a freelance-translator, investment advisor and model. She moved from Estonia to Finland with her parents at the age of 3 and currently resides in Tampere. Her mother, also born in Estonia, is Lithuanian and her father, born in Russia, is Finnish. Kristina speaks 6 languages and has mentioned that learning new languages is one of her hobbies. Karjalainen's other hobbies include singing and swimming. She has been married to the finnish DJ and producer Joonas Hahmo since June 2025.

== Miss Globe International 2012 ==
Karjalainen competed at the Miss Globe International 2012 pageant as Miss Globe Finland. She placed in the Top 5 as the 4th runner-up and won the "Miss Golden Girl" award.

== Eesti Miss Estonia 2013 ==
Kristina Karjalainen was crowned Eesti Miss Estonia 2013 at the Toompea Castle in Tallinn, on June 12. She represented Estonia in Miss Universe 2013. Kristina was crowned by Eesti Miss Estonia 2011 (Miss Universe Estonia 2011), Madli Vilsar.

== Other ==
In 2013 Karjalainen was invited to participate in the Finnish version of the Eyeworks format Reality Queens of the Jungle (Viidakon tähtöset in Finnish), but she had to decline for medical reasons. In 2015, she competes in a lifeguard themed reality TV show led by Martina Aitolehti.

Awards and achievements
Preceded by Natalie Korneitsik	Miss Estonia; 2013	Succeeded by TBA
