= Miss Tahiti =

Beauty contest

- Type: Beauty pageant
- Headquarters: French Polynesia, France
- Members: Miss France
- Official language: French
- Regional director: Leiana Faugerat
- Website: www.misstahiti.com

Miss Tahiti is a French Polynesian beauty pageant which selects a representative for the Miss France national competition from the overseas country of French Polynesia. Despite its name, women from all of French Polynesia are eligible to compete, not solely those from Tahiti. Miss Tahiti has been held annually since 1960.

The current Miss Tahiti is Leia Diard, who was crowned Miss Tahiti 2026 on 26 June 2026. Six women from French Polynesia have been crowned Miss France:

- Edna Tepava, who was crowned Miss France 1974
- Thilda Fuller, who was crowned Miss France 1980, and later resigned
- Mareva Georges, who was crowned Miss France 1991
- Mareva Galanter, who was crowned Miss France 1999
- Vaimalama Chaves, who was crowned Miss France 2019
- Hinaupoko Devèze, who was crowned Miss France 2026

== Results summary ==
- Miss France: Edna Tepava (1973); Thilda Fuller (1979; resigned); Mareva Georges (1990); Mareva Galanter (1998); Vaimalama Chaves (2018); Hinaupoko Devèze (2025)
- 1st Runner-Up: Jeanne Burns (1971); Hinarani de Longeaux (2012); Mehiata Riaria (2013); Hinarere Taputu (2014)
- 2nd Runner-Up: Mira Vahiatua (1974); Moea Amiot (1975); Teumere Pater (1988); Vaimiti Teiefitu (2015); Vaea Ferrand (2016); Matahari Bousquet (2019)
- 3rd Runner-Up: Hinano Teanotoga (1997); Tumateata Buisson (2021)
- 4th Runner-Up: Heitiare Tribondeau (2003); Raipoe Adams (2004)
- 6th Runner-Up: Timia Pascaline Teriiero (1977); Ravahere Silloux (2023)
- Top 12/Top 15: Temanava Domingo (2024)

== Gallery ==
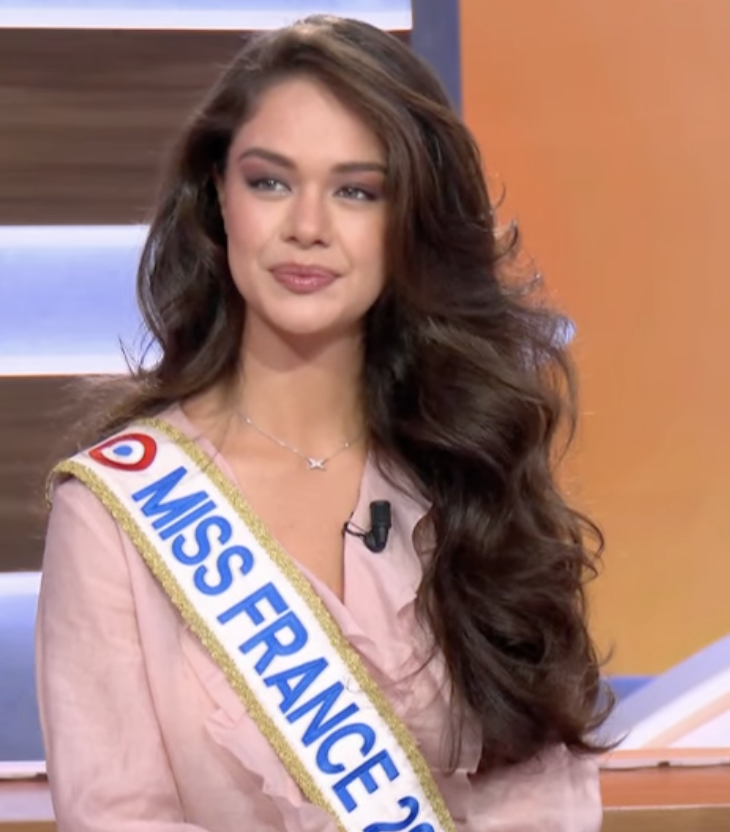
Miss Tahiti 2025 and Miss France 2026
Hinaupoko Devèze

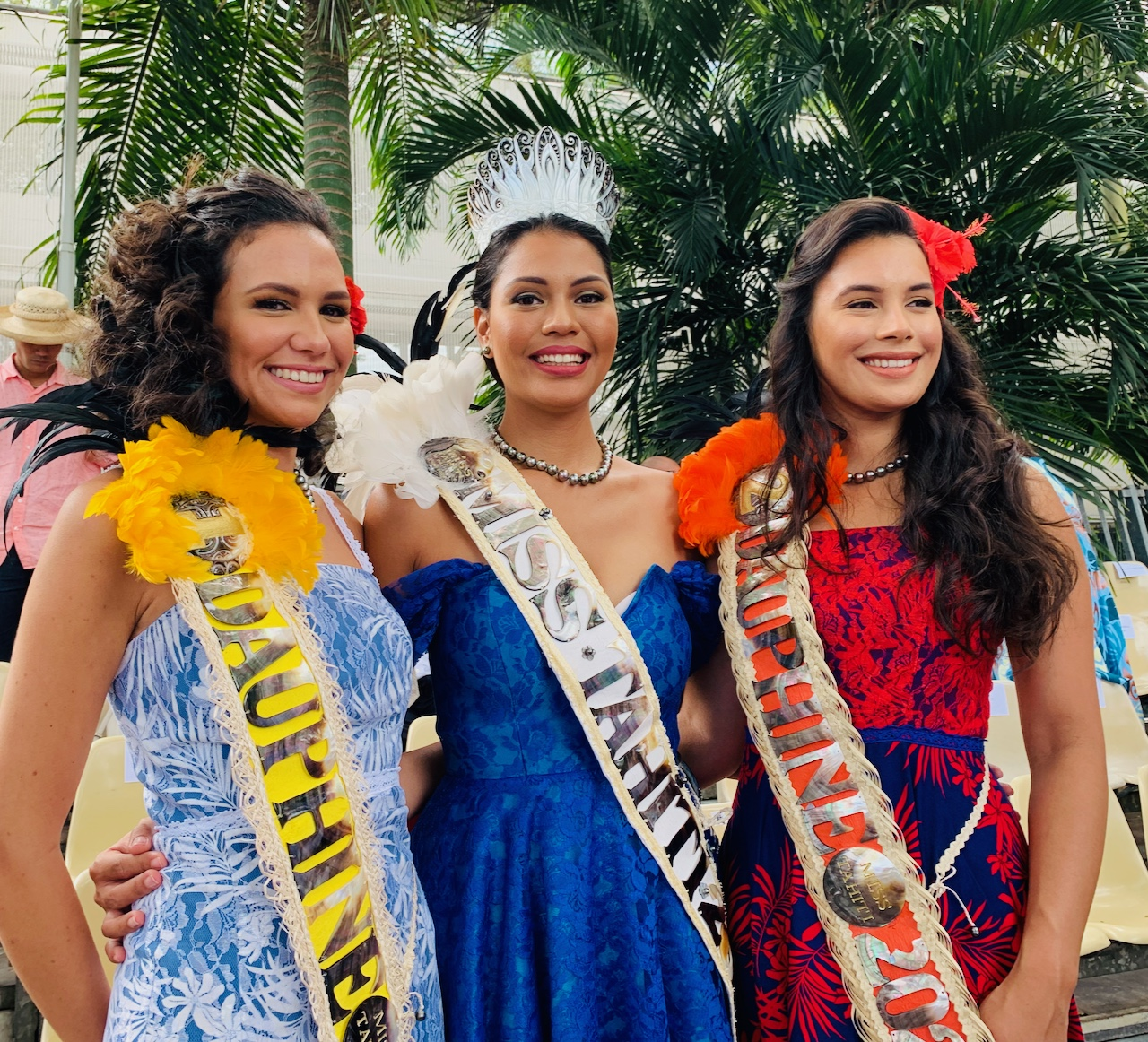
Miss Tahiti 2022 (center)
Herenui Tuheiava

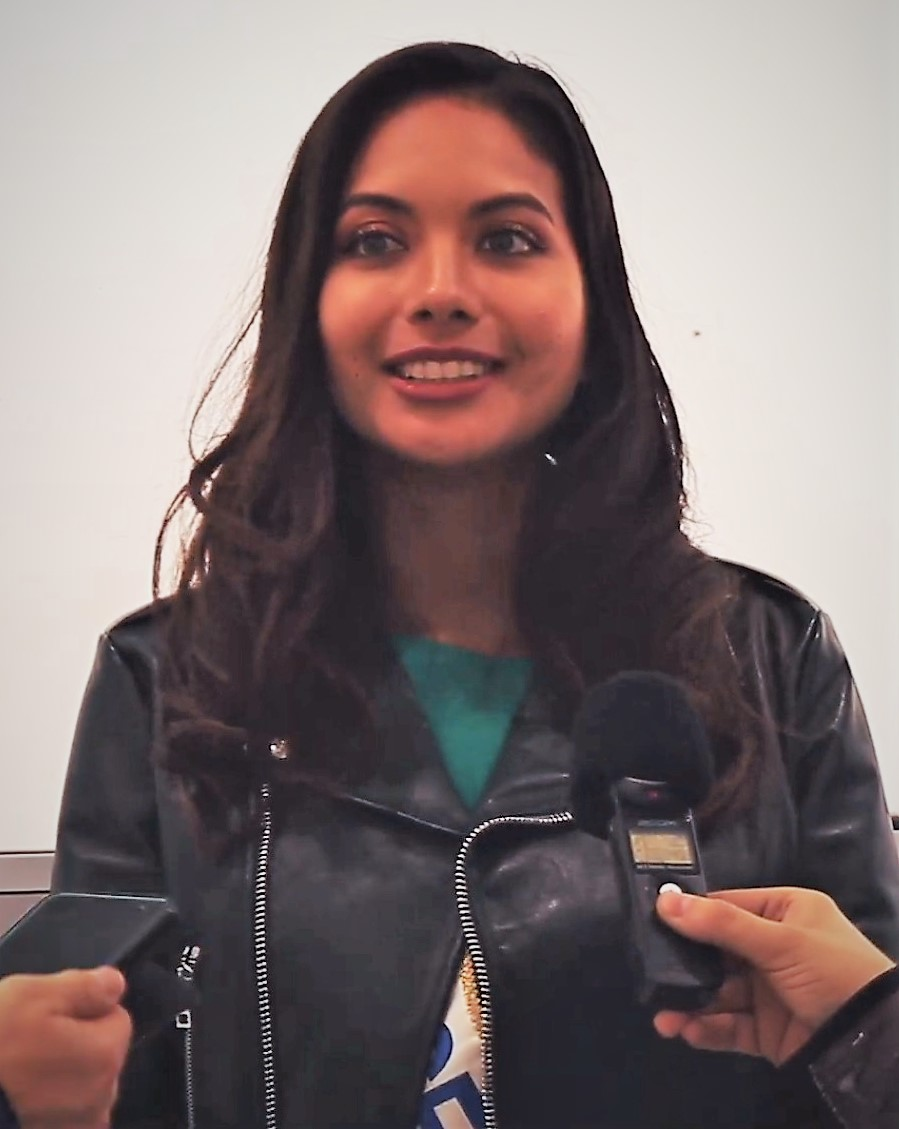
Miss Tahiti 2018 and Miss France 2019
Vaimalama Chaves

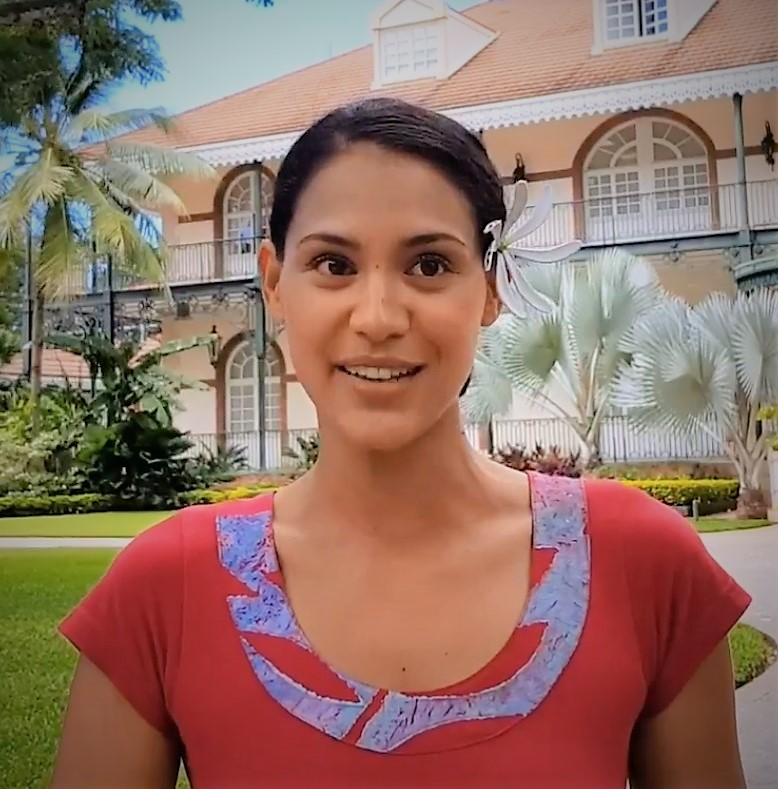
Miss Tahiti 2014
Hinarere Taputu

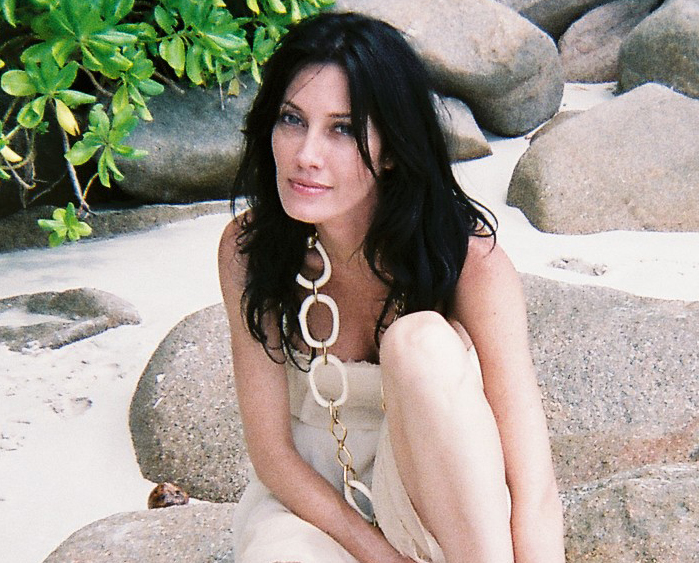
Miss Tahiti 1998 and Miss France 1999
Mareva Galanter

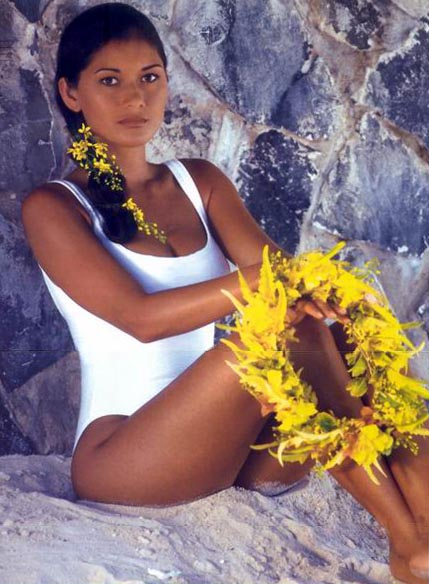
Miss Tahiti 1997
Hinano Teanotoga

== Titleholders ==
Year	Name	Age (Note: Ages at the time of Miss France)	Height	Hometown	Miss France placement	Notes
2026	Leia Diard	22	1.72 m (5 ft 7 1/2 in)	Arue	TBD	
2025	Hinaupoko Devèze	23	1.82 m (5 ft 11 1/2 in)	Māhina	Miss France 2026	
2024	Temanava Domingo	23	1.81 m (5 ft 11 1/2 in)	Punaʻauia	Top 15	
2023	Ravahere Silloux	25	1.72 m (5 ft 7 1/2 in)	Papeete	Top 15 (6th Runner-Up)	Silloux is the cousin of Tumateata Buisson, Miss Tahiti 2021.
2022	Herenui Tuheiava	24	1.77 m (5 ft 9 1/2 in)	Pīraʻe		
2021	Tumateata Buisson	24	1.81 m (5 ft 11 1/2 in)	Pāʻea	3rd Runner-Up	Buisson is the cousin of Ravahere Silloux, Miss Tahiti 2023.
2019	Matahari Bousquet	23	1.77 m (5 ft 9 1/2 in)	Moʻorea-Maiʻao	2nd Runner-Up	
2018	Vaimalama Chaves	24	1.78 m (5 ft 10 in)	Māhina	Miss France 2019	
2017	Turouru Temorere	21	1.70 m (5 ft 7 in)	Arue		
2016	Vaea Ferrand	22	1.75 m (5 ft 9 in)	Papeete	2nd Runner-Up	
2015	Vaimiti Teiefitu	19	1.77 m (5 ft 9 1/2 in)	Māhina	2nd Runner-Up	
2014	Hinarere Taputu	24	1.74 m (5 ft 8 1/2 in)	Rurutu	1st Runner-Up	Top 11 at Miss World 2015 (representing France)
2013	Mehiata Riaria	22	1.77 m (5 ft 9 1/2 in)	Papeete	1st Runner-Up	
2012	Hinarani de Longeaux	22	1.77 m (5 ft 9 1/2 in)	Papeete	1st Runner-Up	Competed at Miss Universe 2013 (representing France)
2011	Rauata Temauri	22	1.70 m (5 ft 7 in)	Arue		
2010	Poehere Wilson	21	1.81 m (5 ft 11 1/2 in)	Papeete		
2009	Léna Puahinano Bonno	20	1.77 m (5 ft 9 1/2 in)	Teva I Uta		
2008	Hinatea Boosie	20	1.70 m (5 ft 7 in)	Nuku Hiva		
2007	Taoahere Richmond	22	1.73 m (5 ft 8 in)	Pīraʻe		
2006	Terehe Pere	21	1.71 m (5 ft 7 1/2 in)	Uturoa		
2005	Mihimana Sachet	22	1.81 m (5 ft 11 1/2 in)	Faʻaʻā		
2004	Raipoe Adams	19	1.72 m (5 ft 7 1/2 in)	Arue	4th Runner-Up	
2003	Heitiare Tribondeau	20	1.70 m (5 ft 7 in)	Moʻorea-Maiʻao	4th Runner-Up	
2002	Rava Maiarii			Tahaʻa	Did not compete	
2001	Ravanui Teriitaumihau	18	1.81 m (5 ft 11 1/2 in)	Papeete	Did not compete	
2000	Vanina Bea				Did not compete	
1999	Manoa Frugé				Did not compete	
1998	Mareva Galanter	19	1.78 m (5 ft 10 in)	Papeete	Miss France 1999	Competed at Miss Universe 1999 (representing France)
1997	Hinano Teanotoga	23	1.71 m (5 ft 7 1/2 in)	Papeete	3rd Runner-Up	
1996	Hinareva Hiro				Did not compete	
1995	Timeri Baudry				Did not compete	
1994	Vaea Olanda				Did not compete	
1993	Thérèse Heikapua Moke			Hiva Oa		
1992	Tania Noble					
1991	Hina Sarciaux			Raʻiātea		
1990	Mareva Georges	21	1.78 m (5 ft 10 in)	Punaʻauia	Miss France 1991	Top 10 at Miss Universe 1991 Competed at Miss World 1991
1989	Myriam Hina Tuheiava		1.79 m (5 ft 10 1/2 in)	Papeete		
1988	Teumere Pater				2nd Runner-Up	
1987	Mearii Manoi					
1986	Loana Bohl				Did not compete	
1985	Ruth Manea	18		Tahaʻa		
1984	Hinarii Kilian	17				Competed at Miss Universe 1985 (representing Tahiti)
1983	Rosa Lanteires					
1982	Teura Tuhiti					
1981	Maimiti Kinander			Raʻiātea		
1980	Tatiana Teraiamano	18		Pāʻea		Top 12 at Miss Universe 1981 (representing Tahiti)
1979	Thilda Fuller	24	1.75 m (5 ft 9 in)	Papeete	Miss France 1980	Fuller resigned her title three days after winning. Top 12 at Miss Universe 1980 (representing Tahiti)
1978	Moeata Schmouker					
1977	Timia Pascaline Teriiero				6th Runner-Up	
1976	Patricia Servonnat			Pīraʻe		
1975	Moea Amiot	19		Papeete	2nd Runner-Up	
1974	Mira Vahiatua			Paparā	2nd Runner-Up	3rd Runner-Up at Miss International 1974 (representing Tahiti)
1973	Edna Tepava	17	1.69 m (5 ft 6 1/2 in)	Paparā	Miss France 1974	
1972	Moea Arapari					
1971	Jeanne Burns				1st Runner-Up	
1970	Maire Léonne Tehei			Papeete	Did not compete	
1969	Dominique Tepava				Did not compete	
1968	Viola Teriitahi				Did not compete	
1966	Sonia Agnierey				Did not compete	
1965	Marie Moua Tapare					4th Runner-Up at Miss World 1965 (representing Tahiti) 3rd Runner-Up at Miss International 1965 (representing Tahiti) Tapare represented Tahiti at Miss France 1967, rather than Sonia Agnierey.
1964	Léa Avaemai					
1963	Mareta Tuihaa					
1962	Yolande Flohr					
1961	Tahia Piehi					
1960	Teura Bauwens					
