= Aysel Manafova =

Azerbaijani model (born 1990)

- Born: Aysel Manafova; 1990 (age 35–36); Baku, Azerbaijan SSR, Soviet Union
- Height: 1.68 m (5 ft 6 in)
- Beauty pageant titleholder
- Title: Miss Azerbaijan 2012
- Hair color: Brown
- Eye color: Brown
- Major competitions: Miss Azerbaijan 2012 (Winner); Miss Universe 2013 (Unplaced)

Aysel Manafova (born 1990) is an Azerbaijani model and beauty pageant titleholder who was crowned Miss Azerbaijan in 2012. She represented her country at Miss Universe 2013 on 9 November 2013 in Moscow, Russia.

== Career ==
Aysel works as a model in Baku.

== Miss Azerbaijan 2012 ==
Aysel was crowned Miss Azerbaijan 2012 in Baku. In 2013, she was appointed to represent Azerbaijan at the Miss Universe 2013 pageant where she failed to place in the Top 16. That was the first time Azerbaijan participated in the contest.

== Personal life ==
She is passionate about gymnastics, horseback riding, swimming and volunteering for various causes, like the Society for Stray Animals Protection.

Awards and achievements
Preceded by Gulnara Alimuradova	Miss Azerbaijan; 2012	Succeeded by Javidan Gurbanova
