= Valeri Kirss =

Estonian media personality (1945– 2026)

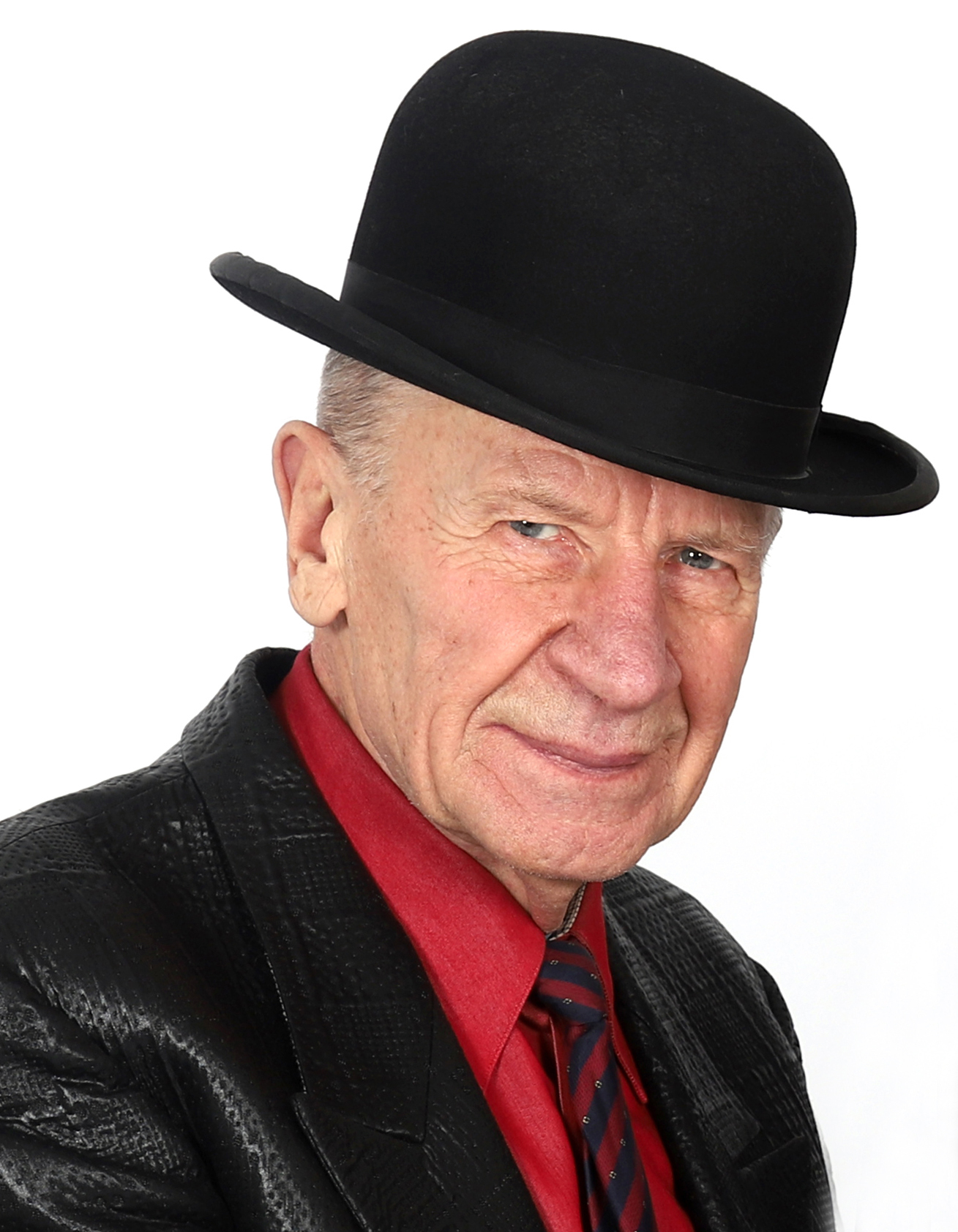
Kirss in 2024

Valeri Kirss (4 May 1945 – 12 March 2026) was an Estonian lawyer, media personality and reviver of the Estonian beauty pageant tradition.

== Life and career ==
Kirss was born on 4 May 1945. He studied at Laiuse, Pedja and Vaimastvere schools and later at Jõgeva Secondary School. In 1973, he graduated from the Faculty of Law of Tartu State University.

After graduating, he worked for ten years as a legal consultant at NGK Linda. Then as an editor at Estonian Radio and Estonian Television.

In the 1980s, Kirss became the director of the advertising club Mainor, consulting center subordinate to the Ministry of Light Industry of the Estonian SSR. In early 1988, he appeared as a guest on the Estonian Radio New Year's program. During the conversation, he proposed the idea of organizing a beauty contest in Estonia again. In the spring of 1988, the board of the Mainor advertising club bought the script and annual action plan for the Miss Estonia contest from Kirss for 350 rubles. On 3 May of the same year, the newspaper Noorte Hääl announced the national beauty contest "Miss Estonia 1988".

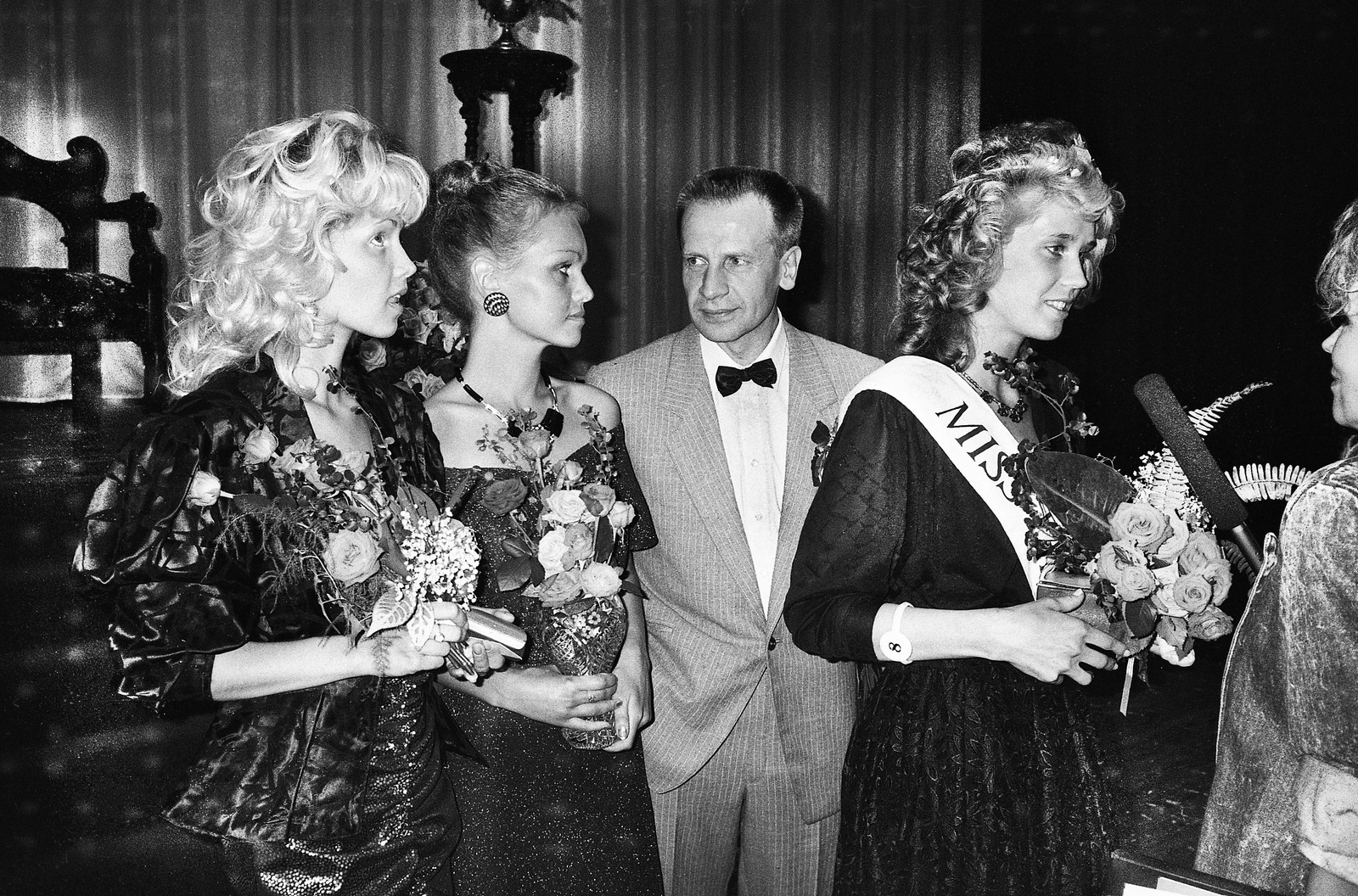
Valeri Kirss in 1988 at the Miss Tallinn 1988 competition (competitors Kätlin Maran, Maila Kotkas, Heli Mets)

The first major preliminary competition took place on 4 June 1988, in Tallinn at the Political Education House, where Miss Tallinn 1988 was chosen. The winner was Heli Mets. Regional competitions took place during the summer: Rannamiss was chosen in Pärnu, Miss Viru in Võsu, and Miss Livonia in Elva. These events brought together thousands of spectators.

Kirss worked as the main organizer, scriptwriter, and manager of Miss Estonia for another 25 years. In addition to Miss Estonia, several other regional and international contests were created under his leadership, such as Miss Tallinn, Miss Livonia, Miss Vironia, and Miss Baltic Sea.

Kitss died on 12 March 2026, at the age of 80.
