= Flora Coquerel =

French model and former Miss France

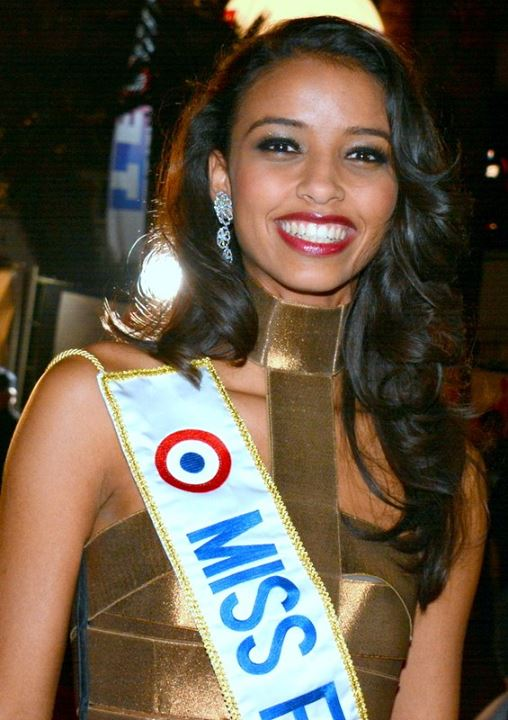
- Coquerel at the NRJ Music Awards 15th Edition (2013)
- Born: 14 April 1994 (age 32); Mont-Saint-Aignan, France
- Height: 1.83 m (6 ft 0 in)
- Beauty pageant titleholder
- Title: Miss Orléanais 2013; Miss France 2014
- Hair color: Black
- Eye color: Brown
- Major competitions: Miss France 2014 (Winner); Miss World 2014 (Unplaced); Miss Universe 2015 (Top 5)

Flora Coquerel (born 14 April 1994) is a French model and beauty pageant titleholder who was crowned Miss France 2014. Coquerel had previously been crowned Miss Orléanais 2013, becoming the first woman representing the Centre-Val de Loire region to become Miss France. She represented France at Miss World 2014 and Miss Universe 2015, placing in the Top 5 at the latter.

== Early life and education ==
Coquerel was born in Mont-Saint-Aignan in Normandy to Frédéric and Séphi Coquerel. Her French father was a business owner, while her Beninese mother was a member of the French Civil Service who worked at écoles maternelles. Coquerel is the youngest of three children, with an elder half-sister and an elder brother.

Coquerel spent her early childhood in the town of Lucé in the Eure-et-Loir department, located within the Chartres area, before moving to the nearby town of Morancez. Prior to becoming Miss France, Coquerel was studying for a brevet de technicien supérieur (BTS) diploma in international trade, and later received her diploma in June 2015, after completing her reign as Miss France.

== Pageantry ==
=== Miss Orléanais 2013 ===
Coquerel won the title of Miss Orléanais 2013. She represented Orléanais (historical province of France) at Miss France 2014.

=== Miss France 2014 ===
Coquerel was crowned as Miss France 2014, after winning over Miss Guadeloupe, Miss Côte d'Azur, Miss Provence, and Miss Tahiti, respectively 4th, 3rd, 2nd and 1st runners-up. She received her crown from the previous Miss France, Marine Lorphelin. Some of the first statements she said to the journalists after winning the title were "Je suis fière de représenter une France cosmopolite, " meaning, "I'm honoured to represent a cosmopolitan France". During Miss France 2015, it was announced that Flora Coquerel was the tallest Miss France ever elected.

Coquerel was nominated as the France representative at Miss World 2014 which took place in London, England on 14 December 2014. She received the highest interview score and was in the top 20 at Miss Top Model and top 25 at "The People's Choice" in Miss World 2014.

Coquerel competed at the Miss Universe 2015 pageant in Las Vegas where she placed in the Top 5. This was only the second time a French woman was among the Top 5 delegates of the Miss Universe competition before Iris Mittenaere who was elected Miss Universe in Miss Universe 2016; the first one was Christiane Martel, who was elected Miss Universe in 1953.

Awards and achievements
Preceded by (Nord-Pas-de-Calais) Camille Cerf	Miss Universe France; 2015	Succeeded by (Nord-Pas-de-Calais) Iris Mittenaere
Preceded by (Burgundy) Marine Lorphelin	Miss World France; 2014	Succeeded by (French Polynesia) Hinarere Taputu
Preceded by (Burgundy) Marine Lorphelin	Miss France; 2014	Succeeded by (Nord-Pas-de-Calais) Camille Cerf
Preceded by Joy Lartigue	Miss Orléanais; 2013	Succeeded by Solène Salmagne
