= Natalie Korneitsik =

Estonian beauty queen and model

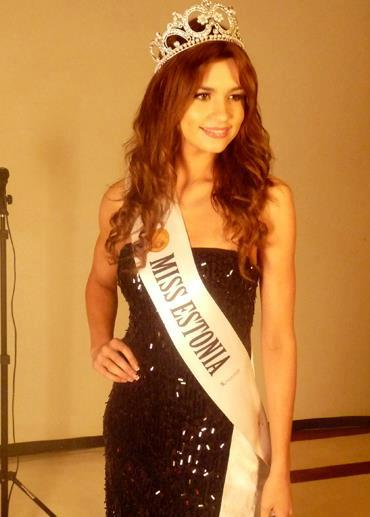
- Born: Tallinn, Estonia
- Occupations: presenter, public figure
- Height: 1.76 m (5 ft 9 1/2 in)
- Beauty pageant titleholder
- Title: Miss Tallinn 2012 (winner); Miss Globe Estonia 2011 (winner)
- Hair color: Brown
- Eye color: Dark Brown
- Major competitions: Miss Estonia 2012, Miss Universe, Miss Globe International (Miss Photogenic, Top 10), Miss Tourism International(Top 10 finalist), Elite Model Look (Top finalist)

Natalie Korneitsik (born 30 December 1992) is an Estonian journalist, model and beauty pageant titleholder who won the title of Miss Universe Estonia 2012 and represented Estonia at Miss Universe. She now resides in Mexico and has been the first Estonian ever on the Mexican television.

== Early life ==
Born in the Estonian capital city Tallinn, Korneitsik participated in the European Parliament Congress in Strasbourg as "the future voice of generation" at the age of 15 after her political essays attracted public attention. Was scouted by the Elite Model Management at the age of 16. Natalie went on to work as a model worldwide. After high school, she moved to Milan to continue her studies in Istituto Europeo di Design. Korneitsik speaks the Estonian, English, Russian, Italian and Spanish languages. She plays the piano and supports A.C. Milan. Natalie is of Estonian, Belarusian and American descent. Natalie Korneitsik appeared in the remake of Coolio's historical single Gangsta's Paradise.

== Eesti Miss Estonia 2012 ==
Natalie Korneitsik, then 19 years old, and 176 cm tall, was elected First Princess. Margret Joseph was elected the Second Princess.

== Miss Universe 2012 ==
Natalie Korneitsik represented her country at Miss Universe 2012 that was held in Las Vegas on 19 December 2012. Natalie did not make it into top 15, though was named by press sources and bloggers as "the best representative from Estonia in many years".

== Post beauty pageants ==
After Miss Universe 2012, Natalie Korneitsik traveled to Asia to promote her title and country. In Indonesia, she guest-starred on several TV shows such as Pas Mantab and Hitam Putih id:Hitam Putih (Acara TV). On the show she claimed her main purpose was a cultural exchange between Estonia and Asia as well as to increase an awareness of her country. Natalie Korneitsik was member of the Estonian delegation at Miss Universe 2013 in Moscow.

She currently lives in Mexico City.

In December 2016, Korneitsik entered CEA of Televisa, becoming reportedly the first-ever Estonian to perform on Mexican television. She was one of the ambassadors of the FIFA World Cup 2018 in Mexico and covered the event later on in Russia Korneitsik hosted The Global Expansion Conference in London in 2022 and 2023. In 2023 Korneitsik decided to continue her education at UNAM by entering the Faculty of Political Science, which made her the first Estonian ever in the hundred-year history of the university. In 2024, Natalie became a partner and judge at the Miss Universe Estonia. In 2025, Natalie Korneitsik took over as national director of Miss Universe Estonia, marking the official return of the Miss Universe license to Estonia.
