= Mehiata Riaria =

French model (born 1991)

- Born: Tahiti, France
- Height: 1.77 m (5 ft 10 in)
- Beauty pageant titleholder
- Title: Miss Tahiti 2013
- Major competitions: Miss Tahiti 2013 (Winner); Miss France 2014 (1st Runner-Up)

Mehiata Riaria (born August 5, 1991, in Tahiti, France) is a French model and beauty pageant titleholder who was the 1st runner-up at the 2014 Miss France competition.

== Personal life ==
Riaria lives in Tahiti. In 2013 she was crowned Miss Tahiti.

=== Miss France 2014 ===
Mehiata represented Tahiti and placed as first runner up at the Miss France 2014.

Awards and achievements
Preceded by (French Polynesia) Hinarani de Longeaux	Miss France 1st Runner-Up; 2014	Succeeded by (French Polynesia) Hinarere Taputu
Preceded by Hinarani de Longeaux	Miss Tahiti; 2013	Succeeded by Hinarere Taputu
