= Hinarere Taputu =

Tahitian model (born 1990)

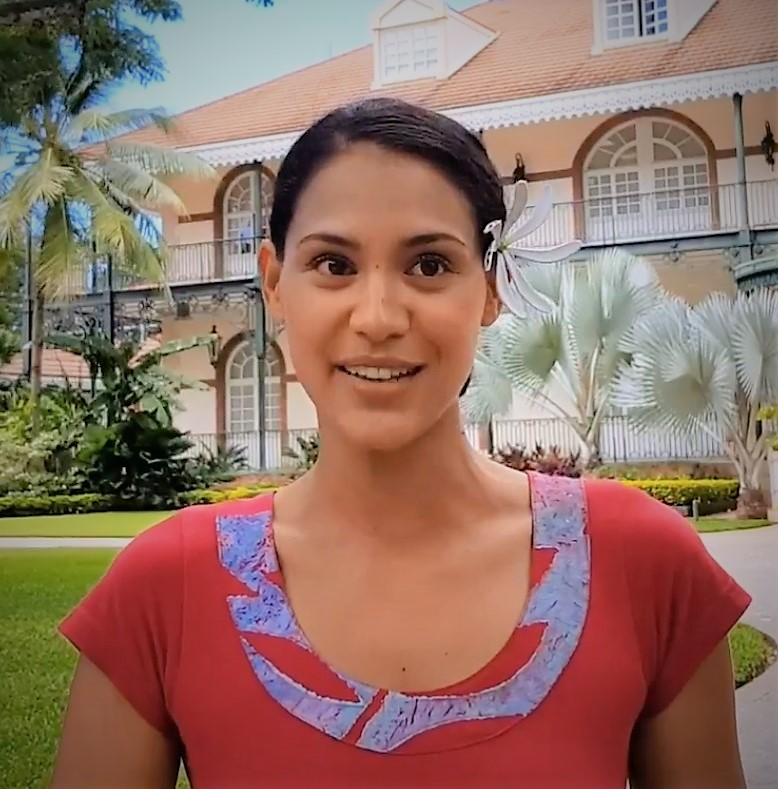
- Taputu at the Assembly of French Polynesia in 2018
- Born: 31 January 1990 (age 36); Tahiti, French Polynesia, France
- Height: 1.74 m (5 ft 9 in)
- Beauty pageant titleholder
- Title: Miss Tahiti 2014; Miss World France 2015
- Hair color: Black
- Eye color: Brown
- Major competitions: Miss France 2015 (1st Runner-Up); Miss World 2015 (Top 10)

Hinarere Taputu (born in Tahiti, France) is a French model and beauty pageant titleholder who was the 1st Runner-Up of Miss France 2015 contest and competed at Miss World 2015.

== Pageantry ==
=== Miss France 2015 ===
On 29 June 2014, she was crowned Miss Tahiti 2014 in Papeete and received the right to represent Tahiti at the Miss France 2015 competition. She placed as first runner up at the Miss France 2015, becoming the third consecutive 1st Runner-Up from Tahiti.

=== Miss World 2015 ===
As Miss World France 2015, Taputu competed at the Miss World 2015 where she made the top 11. She placed in the Top 24 of the Miss World Sport special event challenge as a member of the Blue Team.

Awards and achievements
Preceded by (Orléanais) Flora Coquerel	Miss World France; 2015	Succeeded by (Martinique) Morgane Edvige
Preceded by (French Polynesia) Mehiata Riaria	Miss France 1st runner-up 2015	Succeeded by (Martinique) Morgane Edvige
Preceded by Mehiata Riaria	Miss Tahiti; 2014	Succeeded by Vaimiti Teiefutu
