= Miss Estonia =

Beauty pageant

- Formation: 1923
- Purpose: Beauty pageant
- Headquarters: Tallinn
- Location: Estonia
- Official language: Estonian
- Affiliations: Miss Universe; Miss World; Miss Cosmo
- Website: missestonia.org

Miss Estonia is a national Beauty pageant in Estonia. The main winners mostly competed at Miss Universe pageant.

== History ==
Sinaida Tamm, the first Miss Estonia was elected in April 1923. The competition was arranged by Estonia Film and its main aim was to find a new actress. In 1925 the competition was arranged by a major newspaper Päevaleht. In 1931, Lilli Silberg was the first runner-up at Miss Europe in Paris. In 1932, Nadezda Peedi-Hoffmann was elected Miss Estonia and she held the title for 56 years, until 1988, when Heli Mets was awarded the title. Since then Estonia has had 15 beauty pageant titleholders. Miss Estonia has been participating at Miss Universe since 1993, starting with Kersti Tänavsuu.

=== Cancellation ===
In 2019, the Eesti Miss beauty pageant was cancelled due to the lack of supporters for the annual project.

== Mister Estonia ==
Valeri Kirss also produced the annual Mister Estonia (Mister Eesti) under Eesti Miss Estonia but the pageant does not exist since 2009. Here mentioned the recent winners:

- 2008 — Kaido Matson
- 2006 — Villu Loonde

== Franchise holders ==
The Miss Estonia and related international pageant franchises have been managed by different national directors over time. Estonia Film held the Miss Estonia franchise in the 1920s. Valeri Kirss served as the national director of Miss Estonia from 1988 to 2013. Yuliia Pavlikova has been associated with the Miss Estonia organization since 2024. Leo-Sergei Täht has held the Miss World Estonia franchise since 2021. Natalie Korneitsik has served as the national director for Miss Universe Estonia since 2025.

== Titleholders ==
Year	Eesti Miss Estonia
1923	Sinaida Tamm
1925	Antonie Bergmann
1929	Meeta Kelgo
1930	Amalie Smager
1931	Lilly Silberg
1932	Nadezda Peedi-Hoffmann
1988	Heli Mets
1989	Cathy Korju
1990	Liis Tappo; Miss Baltic Sea 1992
1991	Erika Bauer
1992	Ruth Merila
1993	Lilia Üksvärav
1994	Eva Maria Laan; Miss Baltic Sea 1995
1995	Enel Eha
1996	Helen Mahmastol
1997	Kristiina Heinmets
1998	Kadri Väljaots; Miss Baltic Sea 1999
1999	Triin Rannat
2000	Evelyn Mikomägi
2001	Inna Roos
2002	Jana Tafenau
2003	Maili Nõmm
2004	Sirle Kalma
2005	Jana Kuvaitseva
2006	Kirke Klemmer
2007	Viktoria Azovskaja
2008	Kadri Nogu
2009	Diana Arno
2011	Madli Vilsar
2012	Natalie Korneitsik
2013	Kristina Karjalainen
2021	Karolin Kippasto
2022	Adriana Mass
2023	Eliise Randmaa
2024	Valeria Vasilieva
2025	Emili Denneng

== Big Four pageants representatives ==
=== Miss Universe Estonia ===
- : Declared the winner
- : Finished as runner-up or top 5/6 qualification
- : Finished as one of the finalists or semifinalists
- : Finished as a special awards winner

Year	County	Eesti Miss Estonia	Placement at Miss Universe	Special Award(s)	Notes
Natalie Korneitsik directorship — a franchise holder to Miss Universe from 2025
2026	Harju	Emili Denneng	TBA		
2025	Harju	Brigitta Schaback	Unplaced		Dethroned by the organization for violating the official rules and contractual obligations
2025	Harju	Emili Denneng	Did not compete		Received the title of 1st Runner-Up Miss Universe Estonia following the dethronement of Brigitta Schaback.
Yuliia Pavlikova directorship — a franchise holder to Miss Universe from 2024
2024	Harju	Valeria Vasilieva	Unplaced		
Valeri Kirss directorship — a franchise holder to Miss Universe between 1993—2013
Did not compete between 2014—2023
2013	Harju	Kristina Karjalainen	Unplaced		
2012	Harju	Natalie Korneitsik	Unplaced		
2012	Harju	Katlin Valdmets	Dethroned		
2011	Saare	Madli Vilsar	Unplaced		
Did not compete in 2010
2009	Harju	Diana Arno	Unplaced		
2008	Harju	Julia Kovaljova	Unplaced		
2008	Harju	Kadri Nogu	Did not compete		
2007	Harju	Viktoria Azovskaja	Unplaced		
2006	Harju	Kirke Klemmer	Unplaced		
2005	Harju	Jana Kuvaitseva	Did not compete		
2004	Viljandi	Sirle Kalma	Unplaced		
2003	Harju	Katrin Susi	Unplaced		
2003	Harju	Maili Nomm	Did not compete		
2002	Harju	Jana Tafenau	Unplaced		
2001	Harju	Inna Roos	Unplaced		
2000	Harju	Evelyn Mikomägi	Top 10		
1999	Harju	Triin Rannat	Unplaced		
1998	Harju	Mari Loorens	Unplaced		
1997	Harju	Kristiina Heinmets	Top 10		
1996	Harju	Helen Mahmastol	Unplaced		
1995	Harju	Enel Eha	Unplaced		
1994	Harju	Eva-Maria Laan	Unplaced		
1993	Harju	Kersti Tanavsuu	Unplaced		

=== Miss World Estonia ===
- : Declared the winner
- : Finished as runner-up or top 5/6 qualification
- : Finished as one of the finalists or semifinalists
- : Finished as a special awards winner

Year	County	Miss World Estonia	Placement at Miss World	Special Award(s)	Notes
Leo-Sergei Täht got directorship — a franchise holder to Miss World from 2021; Eesti Missid MTÜ and Nordic Beauty Pageantry Organization under new management took over the Miss World license and held the Miss World Estonia competition. The winner of Miss World Estonia pageant will represent Estonia at Miss World pageant.
2026	Harju	Mari-Ann Rõuk	Did not compete		
2025	Järva	Eliise Randmaa	Top 40	Miss World Sport	
Miss World 2023 was rescheduled to 2024 due to the change of host and when entering India as the new host, there were several issues that caused the postponement until March 2024.
2023	Pärnu	Adriana Mass	Unplaced	Miss World Talent (Top 14)	
Miss World 2021 was rescheduled to 16 March 2022 due to the COVID-19 pandemic outbreak in Puerto Rico, no edition started in 2022.
2021	Tartu	Karolin Kippasto	Unplaced	Miss World Sport (Top 32)	

== Notes ==
- In 1993, Kersti Tänavsuu (Miss Estonia 1993 First runner up) became the first Estonian representative in the Miss Universe pageant.
- Other times that the first runner up replaced the original winner in Miss Universe competition are Mari Loorens (1998), Katrin Susi (2003) and Julia Kovaljova (2008).
- In 2005, Jana Kuvaitseva did not compete at Miss Universe 2005 for personal reasons. None of the runners up were sent to contest.
- The pageant produces 4 Miss Baltic Sea winners: Liis Tappo (1992), Eva Maria Laan (1995), Kadri Väljaots (1999) and Dagmar Makko (2001).
