= Riscle =

Riscle Riscla
- Commune
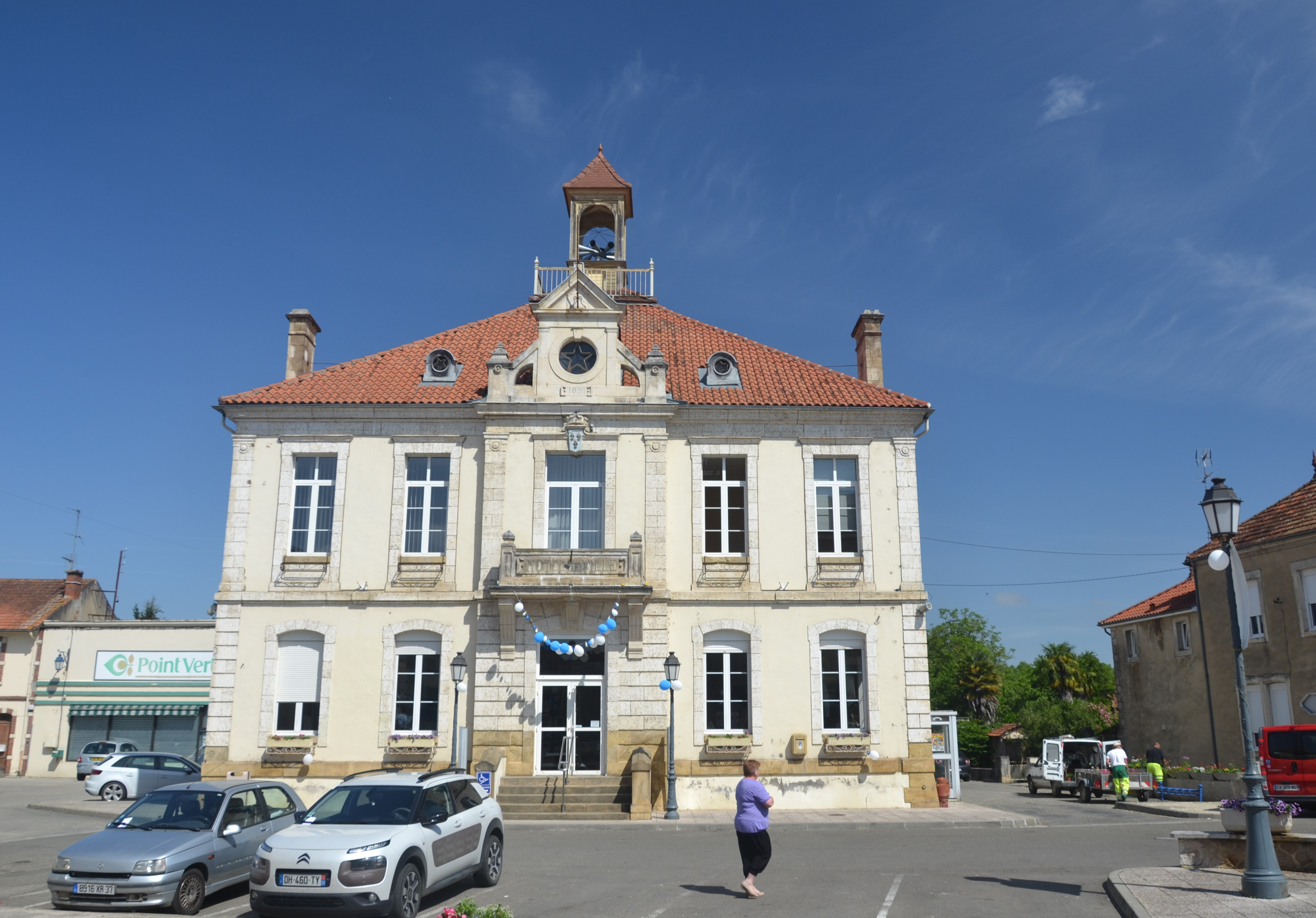
- The town hall in Riscle

- Coat of arms
- Location of Riscle
- Location within France Location within Occitanie
- Coordinates: 43°39′27″N 0°05′09″W
- Country: France
- Region: Occitania
- Department: Gers
- Arrondissement: Mirande
- Canton: Adour-Gersoise
- Intercommunality: Armagnac Adour

Government
  - Mayor (2020–2026): Christophe Terrain
- Area^{1}: 36.55 km^{2} (14.11 sq mi)
- Highest elevation: 231 m (758 ft)
- Lowest elevation: 96 m (315 ft)
- Population (2023): 1,622
  - Density: 44.38/km^{2} (114.9/sq mi)
- Time zone: UTC+01:00 (CET)
  - Summer (DST): UTC+02:00 (CEST)
- INSEE/Postal code: 32344 /32400
- ^{1} French Land Register data, which excludes lakes, ponds, glaciers > 1 km^{2} (0.386 sq mi or 247 acres) and river estuaries.

Riscle (French pronunciation: [ʁiskl]; Gascon: Riscla) is a commune in the Gers department in southwestern France. On 1 January 2019, the former commune Cannet was merged into Riscle.

== Geography ==
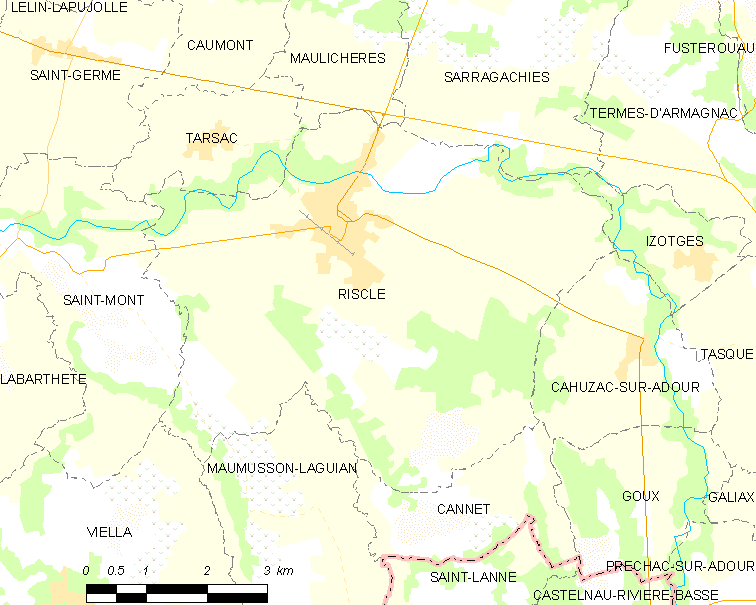
Riscle and its surrounding communes

== Population ==
Population data refer to the area corresponding with the commune as of January 2025.

Historical population
Year	Pop.	±% p.a.
1968	1,912	—
1975	1,904	−0.06%
1982	1,925	+0.16%
1990	1,831	−0.62%
1999	1,730	−0.63%
2007	1,755	+0.18%
2012	1,763	+0.09%
2017	1,830	+0.75%
2023	1,622	−1.99%
Source: INSEE

== See also ==
- Communes of the Gers department
