= Laëtizia Penmellen =

French beauty pageant titleholder

- Born: Villecroze, France
- Height: 1.71 m (5 ft 7 in)
- Beauty pageant titleholder
- Title: Miss Provence 2014; Miss Earth France 2014
- Major competitions: Miss France 2014 (2nd Runner-Up); Miss Earth 2014; (Miss Photogenic)

Laëtizia Penmellen is a French beauty pageant titleholder, who was second runner up at Miss France 2014. She was selected to compete at Miss Earth 2014.

== Biography ==
=== Miss France 2014 ===
Penmellen competed at Miss France 2014, representing her hometown of Provence. She was the second runner-up.

=== Miss Earth 2014 ===
As Miss Earth France, Penmellen went to the Philippines in November 2014 to compete against almost 100 other candidates. She was unable to participate in the contest due to illness.

Awards and achievements
Preceded by Sophie Garénaux, Nord-Pas-de-Calais	Miss Earth France; 2014	Succeeded by Alyssa Wurtz, Alsace
Preceded by Sophie Garénaux, Nord-Pas-de-Calais	Miss France 2nd Runner-Up; 2014	Succeeded by Charlotte Pirroni, Nice
Preceded by Marine Mahiques	Miss Provence; 2013	Succeeded by Anne-Laure Fourmont
