= Cannet =

- Part of Riscle
- Location of Cannet
- Location within France Location within Occitanie
- Coordinates: 43°36′47″N 0°03′08″W
- Country: France
- Region: Occitania
- Department: Gers
- Arrondissement: Mirande
- Canton: Adour-Gersoise
- Commune: Riscle
- Area^{1}: 4.81 km^{2} (1.86 sq mi)
- Elevation: 184 m (604 ft)
- Highest elevation: 231 m (758 ft)
- Lowest elevation: 114 m (374 ft)
- Population (2023): 321
  - Density: 66.7/km^{2} (173/sq mi)
- Time zone: UTC+01:00 (CET)
  - Summer (DST): UTC+02:00 (CEST)
- Postal code: 32400
- ^{1} French Land Register data, which excludes lakes, ponds, glaciers > 1 km^{2} (0.386 sq mi or 247 acres) and river estuaries.

Cannet (French pronunciation: [kanɛ]; Gascon: Canet) is a former commune in the Gers department in southwestern France. On 1 January 2019, it was merged into the commune Riscle.

== Geography ==
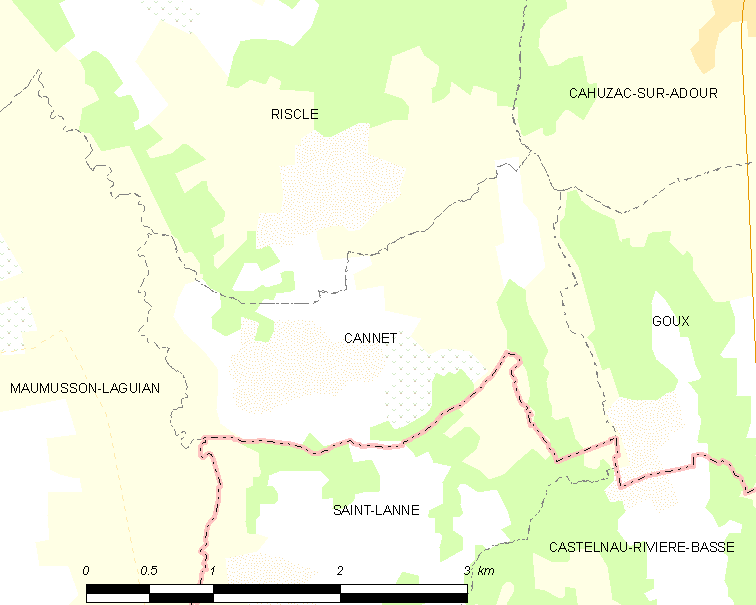
Cannet and its surrounding communes

== See also ==
- Communes of the Gers department
