= Urdens =

- Commune
- Location of Urdens
- Location within France Location within Occitanie
- Coordinates: 43°51′27″N 0°42′05″E
- Country: France
- Region: Occitania
- Department: Gers
- Arrondissement: Condom
- Canton: Fleurance-Lomagne
- Intercommunality: Lomagne Gersoise

Government
  - Mayor (2020–2026): Roland Maragnon
- Area^{1}: 7.77 km^{2} (3.00 sq mi)
- Elevation: 140 m (460 ft)
- Highest elevation: 202 m (663 ft)
- Lowest elevation: 87 m (285 ft)
- Population (2023): 264
  - Density: 34.0/km^{2} (88.0/sq mi)
- Time zone: UTC+01:00 (CET)
  - Summer (DST): UTC+02:00 (CEST)
- INSEE/Postal code: 32457 /32500
- ^{1} French Land Register data, which excludes lakes, ponds, glaciers > 1 km^{2} (0.386 sq mi or 247 acres) and river estuaries.

Urdens is a commune in the Gers department in southwestern France.

== Geography ==
=== Localisation ===
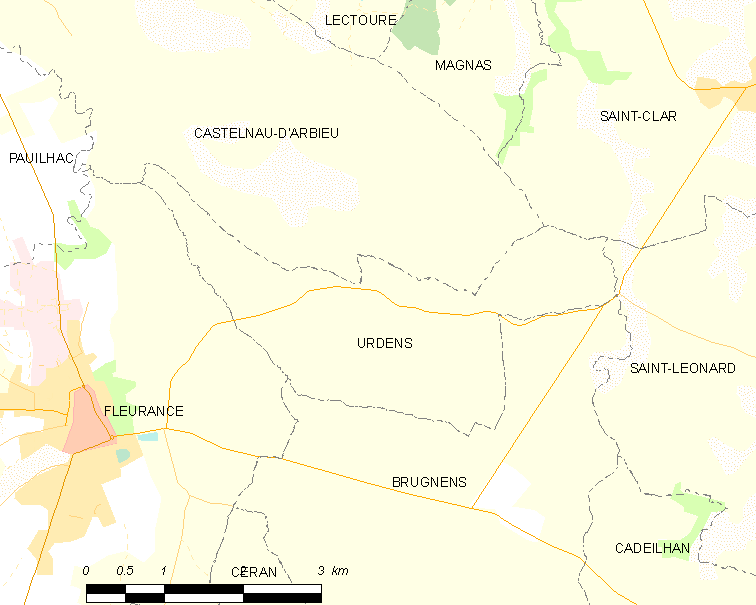
Urdens and its surrounding communes

=== Hydrography ===
The river Auroue forms part of the commune's northeastern border.

== Population ==
Historical population
Year	Pop.	±% p.a.
1968	140	—
1975	179	+3.57%
1982	188	+0.70%
1990	198	+0.65%
1999	181	−0.99%
2007	222	+2.59%
2012	269	+3.92%
2017	292	+1.65%
2023	264	−1.67%
Source: INSEE

== See also ==
- Communes of the Gers department
