= Miss Universe 2013 =

62nd Miss Universe pageant

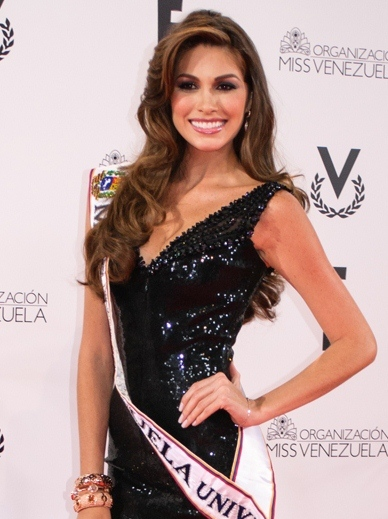
- Gabriela Isler
- Date: 9 November 2013
- Presenters: Thomas Roberts; Mel B; Jeannie Mai; Janine Tugonon
- Entertainment: Emin; Panic! at the Disco; Steven Tyler
- Venue: Crocus City Hall, Krasnogorsk, Moscow, Russia
- Broadcaster: International: NBC; Telemundo; Official:Channel One Russia
- Entrants: 86
- Placements: 16
- Debuts: Azerbaijan
- Withdrawals: Albania; Cayman Islands; Cyprus; Georgia; Ireland; Kosovo; Montenegro; Saint Lucia; Uruguay
- Returns: Austria; Kazakhstan; Myanmar; Slovenia; Turks and Caicos Islands
- Winner: Gabriela Isler; Venezuela
- Congeniality: Jin Ye, China
- Best National Costume: Nastassja Bolívar, Nicaragua
- Photogenic: Paulina Krupińska, Poland

Miss Universe 2013 was the 62nd Miss Universe pageant, held at the Crocus City Hall in Krasnogorsk, Moscow, Russia, on 9 November 2013.

At the conclusion of the event, Olivia Culpo of the United States crowned Gabriela Isler of Venezuela as Miss Universe 2013. It was Venezuela's seventh victory, the second-most in the pageant's history.

Contestants from eighty-six countries and territories competed in this year's pageant. The pageant was hosted by Thomas Roberts and Mel B, with Jeannie Mai as backstage correspondent. Russian singer Emin Agalarov, American pop rock band Panic! at the Disco, and American singer-songwriter Steven Tyler performed in this year's pageant.

== Background ==
Crocus City Hall, the venue

=== Location and date ===
In May 2013, the Miss Universe Organization was in talks to host the 2013 competition in Russia after Emin Agalarov, son of Aras Agalarov and vice-president of Crocus Group, filmed his latest music video in Los Angeles with Miss Universe 2012 Olivia Culpo as his co-star. Paula Shugart, top executive of Miss Universe at that time, raised the idea of hosting the 2013 edition of the pageant in Russia. Agalarov promptly agreed to pay $20 million in exchange for Donald Trump bringing the 2013 competition to Russia. After four weeks of Emin Agalarov's video shoot with Culpo, Trump agreed that the pageant should be held in Moscow at the Crocus City complex, which is owned by the Agalarov family.

On 16 June 2013, during the Miss USA 2013 pageant in Las Vegas, Trump, owner of the Miss Universe Organization, and Miss Universe 2012 Olivia Culpo announced that the 2013 pageant would take place in Moscow, on 9 November 2013. The announcement came after Rob Goldstone, music manager of Russian singer Emin Agalarov, posted on Facebook saying: "Fun meeting with Donald Trump." After the announcement, president of the Crocus Group, Agalarov, and his son Emin joined Trump on stage to sign the official contract.

In 2016, Trump was still involved in the ongoing controversy related to the pageant in Russia, and activities alleged in the Steele dossier.

=== Hosts and performers ===
On 15 August 2013, Andy Cohen, who is openly gay, declined to co-host the pageant, due to the country's recent adoption of anti-gay laws. An Internet petition was also started for the organization to relocate the pageant from Moscow due to these laws as well as human rights concerns. MSNBC anchor Thomas Roberts, also openly gay, took on hosting duties. While he condemned Russia for its anti-gay law, he stated his belief that his presence in Russia would make for a more effective statement against Russian homophobia than boycotting.

=== Selection of participants ===
Contestants from eighty-six countries and territories competed in the pageant. Nine of these delegates were appointees to their national titles and another was crowned after the organization discovered that there was an error in the placements of the finalists.

=== Replacements ===
Hinarani de Longeaux, the first runner-up of Miss France 2013, was appointed to represent France after Marine Lorphelin, Miss France 2013, placed first runner-up at Miss World 2013 and so was ineligible to compete. Ana Vrcelj, the second runner-up of Miss Serbia 2012, replaced Aleksandra Doknić as Miss Universe Serbia 2013 after Doknić replaced Nikolina Bojić as Miss Serbia 2012 because she was married.

Denise Garrido originally was crowned as Miss Universe Canada 2013, but was stripped of her crown after a few hours when the organization discovered that there was a "typo" when the judges' handwritten scores were transferred into a computer program that determines the results. The official winner was Riza Santos, who was previously first runner-up, while Garrido placed as third runner-up.

=== Debuts, returns and withdrawals ===
This edition saw the debut of Azerbaijan, and the returns of Austria, Kazakhstan, Myanmar, Slovenia, and Turks and Caicos Islands. Myanmar who last competed in Miss Universe 1961 as Burma, Austria last competed in Miss Universe 2004, while the others last competed in Miss Universe 2011. Albania, the Cayman Islands, Cyprus, Georgia, Ireland, Kosovo, Montenegro, Saint Lucia, and Uruguay withdrew. Mirjeta Shala of Kosovo withdrew as her visa was denied by Russia as it does not recognize Kosovo as an independent country. Shala's withdrawal resulted in the withdrawal of Miss Universe Albania, Fioralba Dizdari from the pageant for political reasons. Janet Kerdikoshvili of Georgia withdrew due to unexpected health problems. However, both Kerdikoshvili and Shala competed at Miss Universe 2015. Nikoleta Jovanović of Montenegro withdrew as she did not meet the minimum age requirements, and Micaela Orsi of Uruguay withdrew because her visa application was denied by the Russian Embassy. The Cayman Islands, Cyprus, Ireland, and Saint Lucia withdrew after their respective organizations failed to hold a national competition or appoint a delegate.

== Results ==
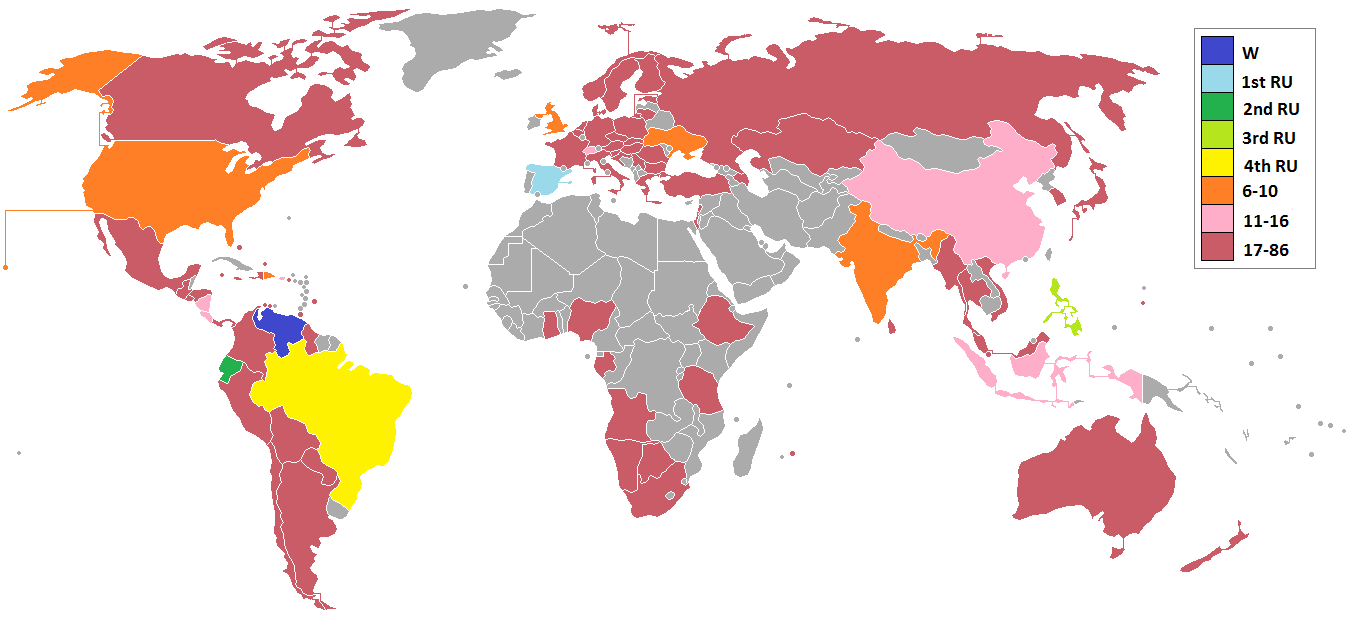
Participating countries and territories.

=== Placements ===
Placement	Contestant
Miss Universe 2013	Venezuela – Gabriela Isler
1st Runner-Up	Spain – Patricia Rodríguez
2nd Runner-Up	Ecuador – Constanza Báez
3rd Runner-Up	Philippines – Ariella Arida §
4th Runner-Up	Brazil – Jakelyne Oliveira
Top 10	Dominican Republic – Yaritza Reyes; Great Britain – Amy Willerton; India – Manasi Moghe; Ukraine – Olga Storozhenko; United States – Erin Brady
Top 16	China – Ye Jin; Costa Rica – Fabiana Granados; Indonesia – Whulandary Herman; Nicaragua – Nastassja Bolívar; Puerto Rico – Monic Pérez; Switzerland – Dominique Rinderknecht

§ - Voted into the Top 16 by viewers

=== Special awards ===
Award	Contestant
Miss Congeniality	China – Ye Jin
Miss Photogenic	Poland – Paulina Krupińska
Ice Princess (Glam Shot)	Philippines – Ariella Arida

==== Best National Costume ====
Placement	Contestant
Winner	Nicaragua – Nastassja Bolívar
1st runner-up	Trinidad and Tobago – Catherine Miller
2nd runner-up	Russia – Elmira Abdrazakova
3rd runner-up	Indonesia – Whulandary Herman
4th runner-up	Japan – Yukimi Matsuo

== Pageant ==
=== Format ===
Same as 2011, fifteen semifinalists were chosen through the preliminary competition; composed of swimsuit and evening gown competitions, and closed-door interviews. The internet voting was still being implemented, with fans being able to vote for another delegate to advance into the semifinals, making the number of semifinalists sixteen. The sixteen semifinalists competed in the swimsuit competition and were narrowed down to ten. These ten competed in the evening gown competition and were narrowed down to five. These five then competed in the question and answer round and the final look.

=== Selection committee ===
==== Preliminary competition ====
The judges were:

- Irina Agalarova – Russian fashion icon
- Corinne Nicolas – modelling industry veteran
- David Perozzi – Emmy-nominated producer and journalist
- Alicia Quarles – New York-based correspondent for E! News
- Gabriel Rivera-Barraza – fashion publicist and philanthropist
- Jose Sariego – Senior Vice President of Business and Legal Affairs for Telemundo Media
- Elena Semikina – Miss Universe Canada 2010

==== Final telecast ====
The judges were:

- Carol Alt – American model and actress, host of Fox News program A Healthy You & Carol Alt
- Italo Fontana – Italian watchmaker, founder of U-Boat Watches
- Philipp Kirkorov – Russian pop singer
- Tara Lipinski – retired American figure skater, 1998 Winter Olympics gold medalist
- Nobu Matsuhisa – Japanese celebrity chef and restaurateur
- Farouk Shami – Palestinian-American businessman, founder of professional hair care products company Farouk Systems
- Steven Tyler – lead vocalist of Aerosmith, former American Idol judge
- Anne Vyalitsyna – Russian model, coach for Oxygen reality show The Face

== Contestants ==
Eighty-six contestants competed for the title.

Country/Territory	Contestant	Age (Note: Ages at the time of the pageant)	Hometown
Angola	Vaumara Rebelo	22	Luanda
Argentina	Brenda González	20	Rosario
Aruba	Stefanie Evangelista	24	San Nicolaas
Australia	Olivia Wells	19	Melbourne
Austria	Doris Hofmann	23	Steyr
Azerbaijan	Aysel Manafova	23	Baku
(The Bahamas) Bahamas	Lexi Wilson	22	Nassau
Belgium	Noémie Happart	20	Liege
Bolivia	Alexia Viruez	19	Santa Cruz
Botswana	Tsaone Macheng	24	Gaborone
Brazil	Jakelyne Oliveira	20	Rondonópolis
British Virgin Islands	Sharie De Castro	22	Tortola
Bulgaria	Veneta Krasteva	21	Sofia
Canada	Riza Santos	27	Calgary
Chile	María Jesús Matthei	21	Santiago
China	Jin Ye	25	Beijing
Colombia	Lucia Aldana	21	Cali
Costa Rica	Fabiana Granados	23	Guanacaste
Croatia	Melita Fabečić	18	Zagreb
Curaçao	Eline de Pool	19	Willemstad
Czech Republic	Gabriela Kratochvílová	23	Chotěboř
Denmark	Cecilia Iftikhar	26	Copenhagen
Dominican Republic	Yaritza Reyes	19	Santo Domingo
Ecuador	Constanza Báez	22	Quito
El Salvador	Alba Delgado	22	San Salvador
Estonia	Kristina Karjalainen	24	Tallinn
Ethiopia	Mhadere Tigabe	19	Addis Ababa
Finland	Lotta Hintsa	25	Helsinki
France	Hinarani de Longeaux	23	Tahiti
Gabon	Jennifer Ondo	21	Libreville
Germany	Anne-Julia Hagen	23	Berlin
Ghana	Hanniel Jamin	19	Accra
(United Kingdom) Great Britain	Amy Willerton	21	London
Greece	Anastasia Sidiropoulou	21	Athens
Guam	Alixes Scott	18	Tumon
Guatemala	Paulette Samayoa	23	Guatemala City
Guyana	Katherina Roshana	24	Georgetown
Haiti	Mondiana Pierre	21	Port-au-Prince
Honduras	Diana Schoutsen	26	Tela
Hungary	Rebeka Kárpáti	19	Budapest
India	Manasi Moghe	22	Mumbai
Indonesia	Whulandary Herman	26	Pariaman
Israel	Titi Yityish Aynaw	22	Netanya
Italy	Luna Voce	25	Crotone
Jamaica	Kerrie Baylis	25	Kingston
Japan	Yukimi Matsuo	26	Kyoto
Kazakhstan	Aygerim Kozhakanova	19	Almaty
Lebanon	Karen Ghrawi	22	Beirut
Lithuania	Simona Burbaitė	21	Vilnius
Malaysia	Carey Ng	25	Kuala Lumpur
Mauritius	Diya Beeltah	25	Quatre Bornes
Mexico	Cynthia Duque	21	Monterrey
Myanmar	Moe Set Wine	25	Yangon
Namibia	Paulina Malulu	24	Windhoek
Netherlands	Stephanie Tency	23	Amsterdam
New Zealand	Holly Cassidy	22	Auckland
Nicaragua	Nastassja Bolívar	25	Diriamba
Nigeria	Stephanie Okwu	19	Imo State
Norway	Mari Ekeløf	24	Hamar
Panama	Carolina Brid	23	Veraguas
Paraguay	Guadalupe González	21	Asunción
Peru	Cindy Mejía	26	Lima
Philippines	Ariella Arida	24	Alaminos
Poland	Paulina Krupińska	26	Warsaw
Puerto Rico	Monic Pérez	23	Arecibo
Romania	Roxana Andrei	26	Târgoviște
Russia	Elmira Abdrazakova	19	Mezhdurechensk
Serbia	Ana Vrcelj	20	Belgrade
Singapore	Shi Lim	25	Bukit Batok
Slovakia	Jeanette Borhyová	21	Ivanka pri Dunaji
Slovenia	Nina Đurđević	22	Maribor
South Africa	Marilyn Ramos	22	Klerksdorp
South Korea	Kim Yu-mi	23	Seoul
Spain	Patricia Rodríguez	23	Canary Islands
Sri Lanka	Amanda Ratnayake	23	Colombo
Sweden	Alexandra Friberg	19	Stockholm
Switzerland	Dominique Rinderknecht	24	Zurich
Tanzania	Betty Omara	20	Dar es Salaam
Thailand	Chalita Yaemwannang	25	Bangkok
Trinidad and Tobago	Catherine Miller	21	Port-of-Spain
Turkey	Berrin Keklikler	19	Istanbul
Turks and Caicos Islands	Snwazna Adams	27	Providenciales
Ukraine	Olga Storozhenko	21	Vinnytsia
United States	Erin Brady	26	East Hampton
Venezuela	Gabriela Isler	25	Valencia
Vietnam	Trương Thị May	25	Ho Chi Minh City
