= Miss Azerbaijan =

Beauty contest

Miss / Mister Azərbaycan Organization
- Formation: 1996
- Type: Beauty pageant
- Headquarters: Baku
- Location: Azerbaijan
- Official language: Azerbaijani
- National Director: Anelya Ordukhan
- Website: missmisterazerbaijan.az

Miss and Mister Azerbaijan (or Miss Azərbaycan) is a national beauty pageant in Azerbaijan.

== History ==
The national beauty contest "Miss Azerbaijan" is held in the country since 1996. Each year, before the beginning of the next contest, an organizing committee which involves representatives of well-known media persons, voluntarily provide organizational support for the contest. The organizing committee is also working with various media organizations, photographers and photo studios, videographers, designers, freelancers, and the sponsors who provide their services to competition on mutually beneficial terms. 16 ladies are selected after casting and the qualifying round for the final selection. During the final round an independent jury consisting of representatives of culture and arts, show business and media, and sponsors, evaluate the finalists' performance by a 10-point system. According to the point calculation results, the main and sponsor nominations are distributed.

== National Franchise ==
All the contests "Miss Azerbaijan" had been held by the license issued by the Ministry of Culture of Azerbaijan until 2006. After 2006, under the new rules, the Ministry canceled the issuance of licenses for cultural events, including the contests.

In 2013, Azerbaijan selected the winner for Miss Universe. Instead, the winner of Miss Azerbaijan 2012 participated at the event. The first time the country participated in the pageant in Miss Universe 2013 on 9 November. Aysel Manafova is the first Miss Universe Azerbaijan titleholder.

== Titleholders ==
| Year | Miss Azərbaycan | Mister Azərbaycan | Notes |
|---|---|---|---|
| 1996 | Narmina Zarbaliyeva | x | Miss Azerbaijan competed at the World's Best Model 1995 in Istanbul, Turkey |
| 1997 | Gulsara Rzayeva | x | |
| 1999 | Fatima Abbasguliyeva | x | |
| 2000 | Valida Abasova | x | |
| 2001 | Fatima Suleymanova | x | |
| 2002 | Samira Rasulova | x | |
| 2003 | Sabina Hashimova | x | |
| 2004 | Olesya Sergeyeva | x | Miss Azerbaijan competed at the Miss Intercontinental 2004 in Huhhot, China |
| 2005 | Shovkat Gasimova | x | |
| 2006 | Gunay Musayeva | x | |
| 2010 | Gulnara Alimuradova | x | Miss Azerbaijan withdrew, due to lack of sponsorship, to Miss Universe 2010 |
| 2012 | Aysel Manafova | x | The first Miss Azerbaijan who competed at the Miss Universe 2013 in Moscow, Russia. She was appointed by Aras Agalarov, one of the main organizers of the pageant. |
| 2013 | Fidan Mammadova | x | |
| 2014 | Javidan Gurbanova | x | Miss Azerbaijan placed as the Third Runner-up and Photogenic award at the Queen of the Universe 2015 |
| 2015 | Natalia Sokolovskaya | Elvin Mammadov | |
| 2016 | Oksana Barkhatova | Parviz Khalilov | |
| 2017 | Razi Aliyeva | Ali Huseynov | |
| 2018 | Narmina Hajiyeva | Shakir Ahmadzade | |
| 2019 | Samra Huseynova | Nijat Alakbarli | |
| 2020 | Banu Shujai | Elçin Dadaşov | |
| 2021 | Milan Babayeva | Tengiz Rustamkhanli | |
| 2022 | Nurlana Valiyeva | Isa Alakbarov | |
| 2023 | Javidan Kesemenli | Kamelia Youssef | |
| 2024 | Deniz Ismayeva | Ismali Abbsazade | |
| 2025 | Aytən Əbilova | Ülvü Mehrəli | |

== Azerbaijani at Grand slam beauty pageants ==
=== Miss Universe Azerbaijan ===
- : Declared the winner
- : Finished as a runner-up or top 5/6 qualification
- : Finished as one of the finalists or semifinalists
- : Finished as a special awards winner

| Year | Region | Miss Azerbaijan | Placement at Miss Universe | Special Award(s) | Notes |
Ernest Hadrian Böhm directorship — a franchise holder to Miss Universe from 2024
Did not compete since 2025
| 2024 | Baku | Bahar Mirzayeva | Did not compete | | Due to internal matter, Bahar did not present to Miss Universe. In early quarantine, her official portrait on Miss Universe website finally disappeared and confirmed that she will not compete at Miss Universe 2024. |
Aras Agalarov directorship — a franchise holder to Miss Universe in 2013
Did not compete between 2015—2023
| 2013 | Baku | Aysel Manafova | Unplaced | | Aysel was sponsored by Aras Agalarov (only 2013), one of the main organizers of the Miss Universe 2013 in Moscow, Russia. |
