= Pays de Savoie =

Term for Savoie and Haute-Savoie, French

Coordinates: 45°34′N 5°56′E

(Les) Pays de Savoie, that means Count(r)ies of Savoy, is a term appeared in the early 1980s to name the two French departments of Savoie and Haute-Savoie as a whole entity.

The Assemblée des Pays de Savoie^{(fr)} (Assembly of the Savoyan count(r)ies) was created in February 2001 by a common declaration of the presidents of the General Councils. It is a public organization with the legal personality. Its main goal is to facilitate the realization of common projects between those two departments. It is run by members of the General Councils of both departments. It could be the first step for the creation of a new region "Pays de Savoie" separated of the Rhône-Alpes region.

== See also ==
- Savoy Region Movement
