= Marine Lorphelin =

French model; Miss France 2013

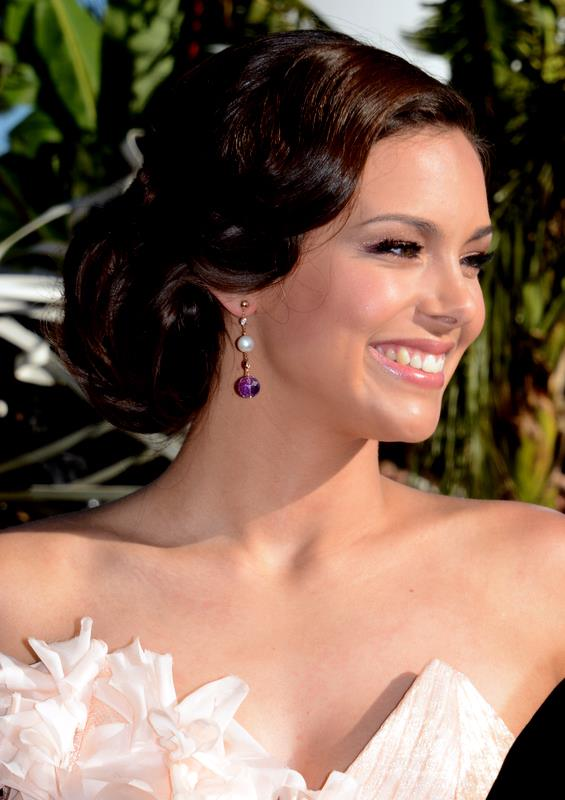
- Born: 16 March 1993 (age 33); Mâcon, France
- Education: Claude Bernard University Lyon 1
- Height: 1.76 m (5 ft 9 1/4 in)
- Beauty pageant titleholder
- Title: Miss Saône-et-Loire 2012; Miss Bourgogne 2012; Miss France 2013
- Hair colour: Brown
- Eye colour: Green
- Major competitions: Miss France 2013 (Winner); Miss World 2013 (1st Runner-Up)

Marine Lorphelin (born 16 March 1993) is a French model, beauty pageant titleholder and General practitioner who was crowned Miss France 2013 on 8 December 2012, representing the region of Burgundy and then represented France at Miss World 2013 and placed 1st runner up.

== Early life ==
Lorphelin attended the College Bréart, and the Lycée Lamartine in Mâcon, named after the famous French poet and politician hailing from Mâcon, Alphonse de Lamartine. She graduated with highest honors in 2011 from high school with a focus on science and was admitted to the Universite Claude Bernard, Lyon 1's school of medicine.

== Miss France ==
Miss Bourgogne 2012 title winner, Marine Lorphelin was crowned Miss France 2013 by the winner of the previous year Delphine Wespiser (Miss France 2012) at the grand finale of the 66th edition of Miss France beauty pageant at the Zenith in Limoges on Grand coronation night of Saturday 8 December 2012.

As Miss France, Marine Lorphelin has promoted two causes: children's health and the donation of organs. She has signed documents expressing her wish for her organs to be donated post-mortem to those in need, has run in the 2013 Paris Marathon, and has performed numerous dangerous tasks in the Fort Boyard programme to raise 18,000 euros for Mecenat Chirurgie Cardiaque, a French charity that raises money for the heart transplants of children suffering from heart disease. To achieve this, she had to perform tasks as difficult as a bungee jump, riding a bicycle underwater, and diving in ice-cold water to uncover clues about the prize. She participated in the programme for the second time in June 2014.

Marine Lorphelin has also participated twice in the Mot de Passe tournament (the French version of the Million Dollar Password) and once in the Qui veut gagner des millions? programme, winning 48,000 euros in the latter to combat AIDS.

== Miss World ==
Marine Lorphelin was the First (1st) Runner up at Miss World 2013, a beauty pageant that was held in Indonesia, out of 131 contestants. As the highest-scored European candidate, she also won the title of Miss World Europe.

Before the final, she was selected as the 1st runner up of Miss Beach Beauty Fashion, 2nd runner up in the Miss Top Model competition, finished in the 6th place for Miss Beauty with a Purpose, and won Best World Dress Designer (Spectacular Evening Wear).

After the final, Lorphelin won the 2013 Timeless Beauty Award by Missosology, a popular beauty pageant blog and magazine. She competed against 68 others from different major beauty pageants in 2013.

== Personal life ==
In 2018, Lorphelin was in her first year of a family medicine residency in Paris. Her hobbies are painting, art and fashion.

Awards and achievements
Preceded by (Wales) Sophie Moulds	Miss World Europe and Miss World 1st Runner-up; 2013	Succeeded by (Hungary) Edina Kulcsár
Preceded by (Alsace) Delphine Wespiser	Miss World France; 2013	Succeeded by (Orléanais) Flora Coquerel
Preceded by (Alsace) Delphine Wespiser	Miss France; 2013	Succeeded by (Orléanais) Flora Coquerel
Preceded by Elodie Paillardin	Miss Bourgogne; 2012	Succeeded by Marie Reintz
Preceded by Agathe Dufour	Miss Saône-et-Loire; 2012	Succeeded by Anne Cranga
