= Sylvie Tellier =

French television personality

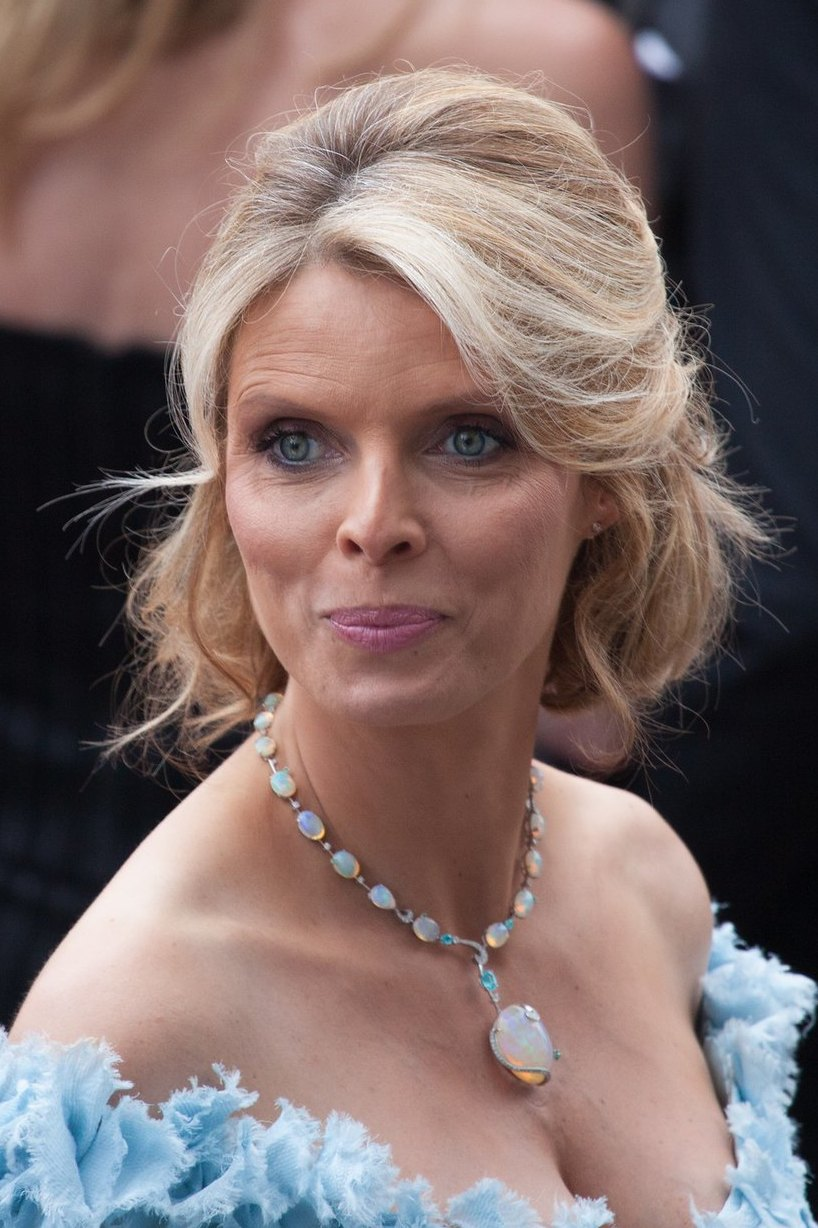
- Tellier in 2018
- Born: 28 May 1978 (age 48); Nantes, France
- Education: University of Nantes (DEUG); Jean Moulin University Lyon 3 (LLM)
- Occupations: Television personality; businesswoman
- Children: 3
- Beauty pageant titleholder
- Title: Miss Vendée 1997; Miss Lyon 2001; Miss France 2002
- Hair color: Blonde
- Eye color: Blue
- Major competitions: Miss France 2002 (Winner); Miss Universe 2002 (Unplaced)

Sylvie Tellier (born 28 May 1978) is a French television personality, businesswoman and beauty pageant titleholder who was crowned Miss France 2002. Previously, Tellier had been crowned Miss Lyon 2001, becoming the seventh woman from Rhône-Alpes to be crowned Miss France. As Miss France, Tellier also competed at Miss Universe 2002.

From 2007 to 2022, Tellier served as national director of the Miss France Company.

== Early life and education ==
Tellier was born in Nantes to parents from Normandy. She was raised in Les Sables-d'Olonne, and grew up in a family of modest means. After receiving a DEUG in law from the University of Nantes, Tellier moved to Lyon to attend Jean Moulin University Lyon 3. She ultimately graduated from the school with a master's degree in private law, specializing in business law and tax law.

== Pageantry ==
=== Early pageantry ===
Tellier first began competing in pageantry in 1997, after being encouraged by the mother of her boyfriend at the time to compete in Miss Vendée 1997. She went on to win the title, which qualified her to compete in Miss Pays de la Loire 1997, a qualifying pageant for Miss France. Tellier went on to place as the first runner-up, behind winner Caroll Parfait.

=== Miss France 2002 ===
Four years after winning Miss Vendée, Tellier opted to return to pageantry. Now residing in Lyon, Tellier competed in Miss Lyon 2001, where she won the title. As Miss Lyon, Tellier qualified directly for Miss France 2002. She later represented Lyon at the Miss France 2002 competition in Alsace, where she was crowned the winner. Following her win, she became the seventh woman representing the Rhône-Alpes region to win the title.

As Miss France, Tellier became a nationwide representative of France. She later represented the country at Miss Universe 2002, where she was unplaced. Tellier completed her reign the following year, after crowning Corrine Coman of Guadeloupe as Miss France 2003.

=== Miss France Company national director ===
Tellier joined the Miss France Company in 2005, hired as the head of external relations. Two years later, after reorganization within Endemol France, Tellier was appointed national director of the Miss France Company and head of the Miss Europe Organization, by Endemol France director Virginie Calmels. With her appointment, she succeeded Geneviève de Fontenay, who had served in the position for 20 years. In August 2022, it was announced that Tellier had resigned as national director of Miss France, and had been replaced by Cindy Fabre. She remained with the organization in a ceremonial and advisory role until the conclusion of Miss France 2023.

== Personal life ==
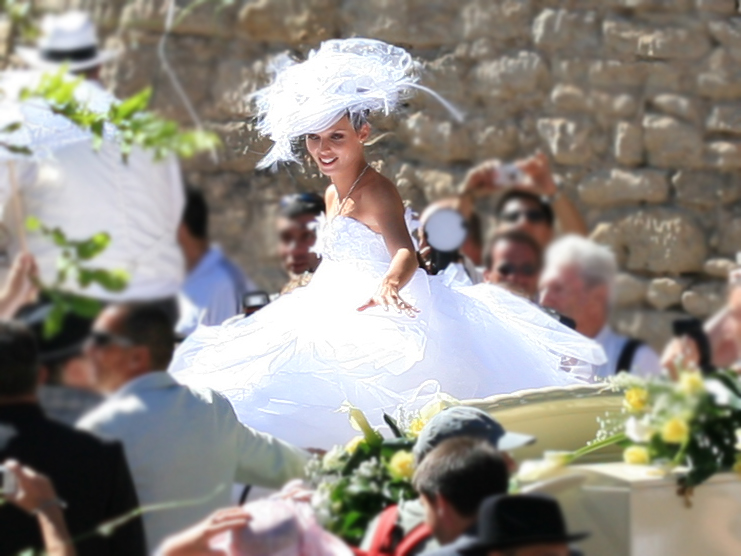
Tellier at her wedding in 2007

Tellier married her first husband, Camille Le Maux, in June 2007 in Gordes. They had one son together, born in San Jose, California in 2010. They divorced in 2012. Tellier gave birth to her second child, a daughter, in 2014. She married her second husband in 2017. Her third child, a son, was born in 2018.

In June 2023, Tellier was made a knight of the Ordre national du Mérite, in honor of her philanthropic work and the managing of Miss France.

Awards and achievements
Preceded by (Picardy) Élodie Gossuin	Miss France; 2002	Succeeded by (Guadeloupe) Corrine Coman
Preceded by Nawal Benhlal	Miss Lyon; 2001	Succeeded by Marie Comte
