= Miss Burgundy =

Beauty contest

- Type: Beauty pageant
- Headquarters: Burgundy, France
- Members: Miss France
- Official language: French
- Regional director: Naomi Bailly

Miss Burgundy (French: Miss Bourgogne) is a French beauty pageant which selects a representative for the Miss France national competition from the region of Burgundy. The first Miss Burgundy was crowned in 1963, although the title was not used regularly until 1993.

The current Miss Burgundy is Ilona Perrot, who was crowned Miss Burgundy 2026 on 31 May 2026. Three women from Burgundy have been crowned Miss France:

- Arlette Collot, who was crowned Miss France 1964, and later dethroned
- Sonia Rolland, who was crowned Miss France 2000
- Marine Lorphelin, who was crowned Miss France 2013

== Results summary ==
- Miss France: Arlette Collot (1963; dethroned); Sonia Rolland (1999); Marine Lorphelin (2012)
- 1st runner-up: Maria Dornier (1964); Nathalie Pereira (1993); Lucie Degletagne (2003)
- 3rd runner-up: Célia Jourdheuil (1998); Vicky Michaud (2007); Sophie Diry (2019)
- 4th runner-up: Sophie Roger (1994); Lou-Anne Lorphelin (2020)
- 5th runner-up: Clara Diry (2024)
- 6th runner-up: Maud Aguilar (1997)
- Top 12/top 15: Sandrine Caire (1988); Cendrine Laurencin (1992); Angélique Viero (2004); Elodie Paillardin (2011); Marie Reintz (2013); Luna Lacharme (2023)

== Gallery ==
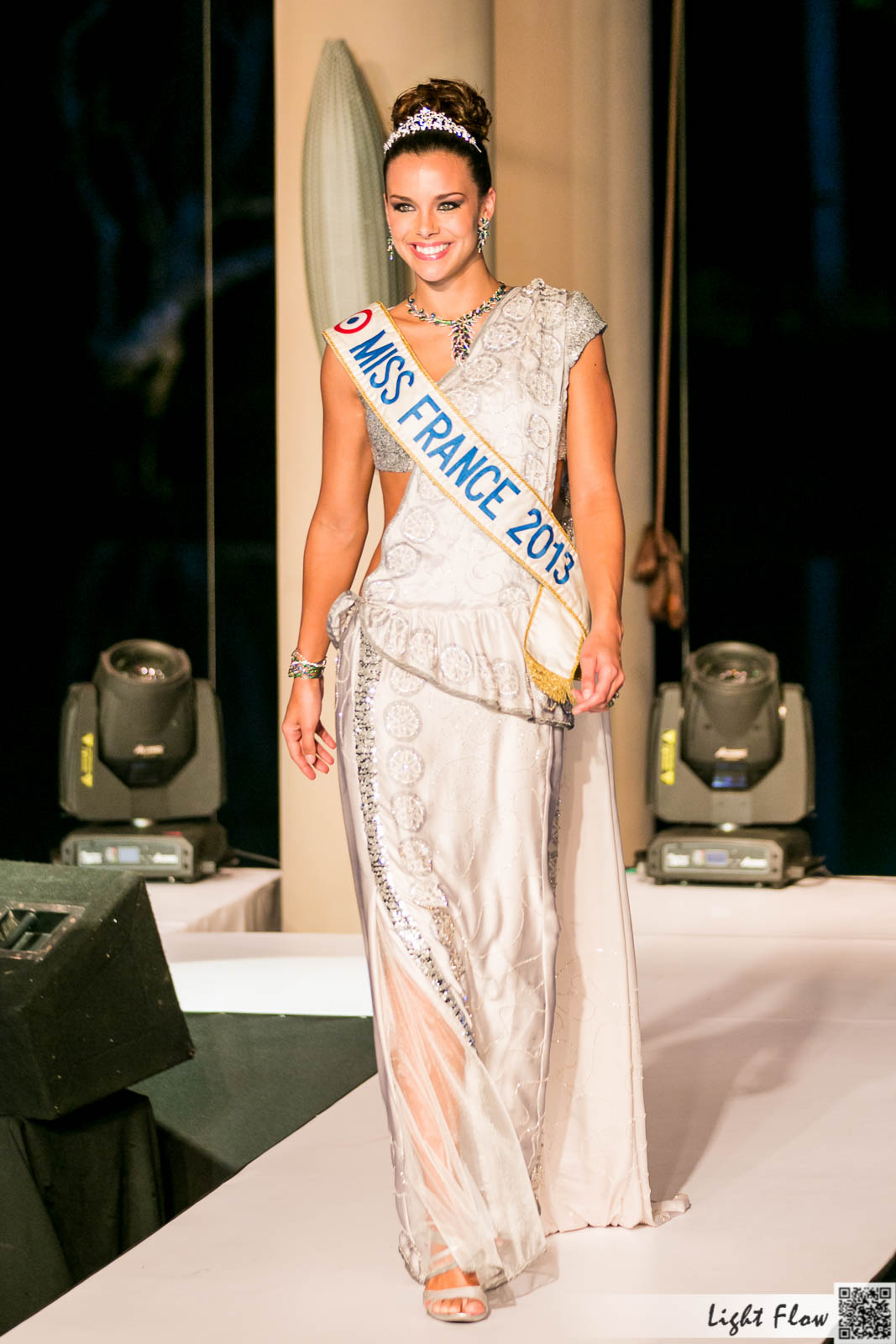
Miss Burgundy 2012 and Miss France 2013
Marine Lorphelin

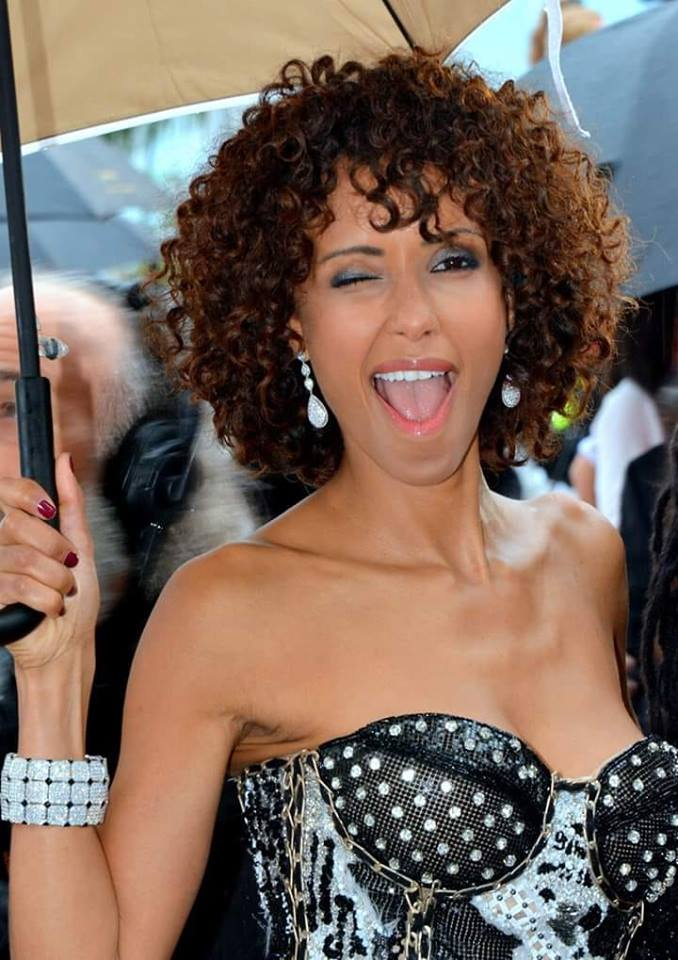
Miss Burgundy 1999 and Miss France 2000
Sonia Rolland

== Titleholders ==
Year	Name	Age (Note: Ages at the time of Miss France)	Height	Hometown	Miss France placement	Notes
2026	Ilona Perrot	23	1.76 m (5 ft 9 1/2 in)	La Fermeté	TBD	
2025	Charlène Laurin	22	1.82 m (5 ft 11 1/2 in)	L'Abergement-Sainte-Colombe		
2024	Clara Diry	21	1.72 m (5 ft 7 1/2 in)	Saint-Agnan	Top 15 (5th Runner-Up)	Diry is the sister of Sophie Diry, Miss Burgundy 2019.
2023	Luna Lacharme	18	1.75 m (5 ft 9 in)	La Chapelle-de-Guinchay	Top 15	
2022	Lara Lebretton	23	1.76 m (5 ft 9 1/2 in)	Givry		
2021	Chloé Galissi	21	1.72 m (5 ft 7 1/2 in)	Chalon-sur-Saône		
2020	Lou-Anne Lorphelin	23	1.71 m (5 ft 7 1/2 in)	Charnay-lès-Mâcon	4th Runner-Up	Lorphelin is the sister of Marine Lorphelin, Miss Burgundy 2012 and Miss France 2013.
2019	Sophie Diry	22	1.77 m (5 ft 9 1/2 in)	Saint-Agnan	3rd Runner-Up	Diry is the sister of Clara Diry, Miss Burgundy 2024.
2018	Coline Touret	19	1.73 m (5 ft 8 in)	Auxerre		
2017	Mélanie Soarès	23	1.72 m (5 ft 7 1/2 in)	Nevers		
2016	Naomi Bailly	21	1.72 m (5 ft 7 1/2 in)	Dijon		
2015	Jade Vélon	21	1.75 m (5 ft 9 in)	Mâcon		
2014	Janyce Guillot	19	1.82 m (5 ft 11 1/2 in)	Bruailles		
2013	Marie Reintz	22	1.79 m (5 ft 10 1/2 in)	Bligny-lès-Beaune	Top 12	
2012	Marine Lorphelin	19	1.76 m (5 ft 9 1/2 in)	Charnay-lès-Mâcon	Miss France 2013	Lorphelin is the sister of Lou-Anne Lorphelin, Miss Burgundy 2020. 1st Runner-Up at Miss World 2013
2011	Elodie Paillardin	19	1.77 m (5 ft 9 1/2 in)	Gevrey-Chambertin	Top 12	
2010	Alice Detollenaere	23	1.73 m (5 ft 8 in)	Chitry-les-Mines		
2009	Jenna Tournay	19	1.75 m (5 ft 9 in)	Talant		
2008	Tiphaine Deschamps	22	1.75 m (5 ft 9 in)	Chagny		
2007	Vicky Michaud	20	1.72 m (5 ft 7 1/2 in)	Bourbon-Lancy	3rd Runner-Up	Competed at Miss International 2008
2006	Cécilia Martin	20	1.74 m (5 ft 8 1/2 in)	Chalon-sur-Saône		
2005	Delphine Cordier	18	1.75 m (5 ft 9 in)	Marsannay-la-Côte		
2004	Angélique Viero	23	1.77 m (5 ft 9 1/2 in)	Bussy-en-Othe	Top 12	
2003	Lucie Degletagne			Romanèche-Thorins	1st Runner-Up	Top 15 at Miss International 2004
2002	Aurélie Bonin	20	1.80 m (5 ft 11 in)	Avallon		
2001	Laure Matioli			Marsannay-le-Bois		
2000	Joy Grimal			Dijon		
1999	Sonia Rolland	18	1.78 m (5 ft 10 in)	Cluny	Miss France 2000	Top 10 at Miss Universe 2000
1998	Célia Jourdheuil			Dijon	3rd Runner-Up	
1997	Maud Aguilar			Chalon-sur-Saône	Top 12 (6th Runner-Up)	
1996	Stéphanie Sevat			Is-sur-Tille		
1995	Patricia Fleury			L'Abergement-de-Cuisery		
1994	Sophie Roger			Cuisery	4th Runner-Up	
1993	Clarisse Garçonnat					Garçonnat was crowned Miss Pays d'Orthe, representing northern Burgundy and Champagne-Ardenne, while Pereira was crowned Miss Burgundy, representing southern Burgundy. Pereira placed in the Top 14 at Miss International 1994.
1993	Nathalie Pereira			Genlis	1st Runner-Up	Garçonnat was crowned Miss Pays d'Orthe, representing northern Burgundy and Champagne-Ardenne, while Pereira was crowned Miss Burgundy, representing southern Burgundy. Pereira placed in the Top 14 at Miss International 1994.
1992	Patricia Rousselet					Rousselet was crowned Miss North Burgundy (French: Miss Bourgogne-Nord) while Laurencin was crowned Miss South Burgundy (French: Miss Bourgogne-Sud).
1992	Cendrine Laurencin			Mâcon	Top 12	Rousselet was crowned Miss North Burgundy (French: Miss Bourgogne-Nord) while Laurencin was crowned Miss South Burgundy (French: Miss Bourgogne-Sud).
1988	Sandrine Caire				Top 12	Caire was crowned Miss Burgundy two years in a row.
1987	Sandrine Caire					Caire was crowned Miss Burgundy two years in a row.
1986	Patricia Verchère	18	1.78 m (5 ft 10 in)			
1979	Nicole Rondière					
1978	Frédérique Bricage					
1972	Aleth Mosson			Dijon		
1964	Maria Dornier				1st Runner-Up	
1963	Arlette Collot	21		Clomot	Miss France 1964 (dethroned)	Collot was dethroned in August 1964, after refusing to travel throughout France as part of her official duties.
