= Miss France 2026 =

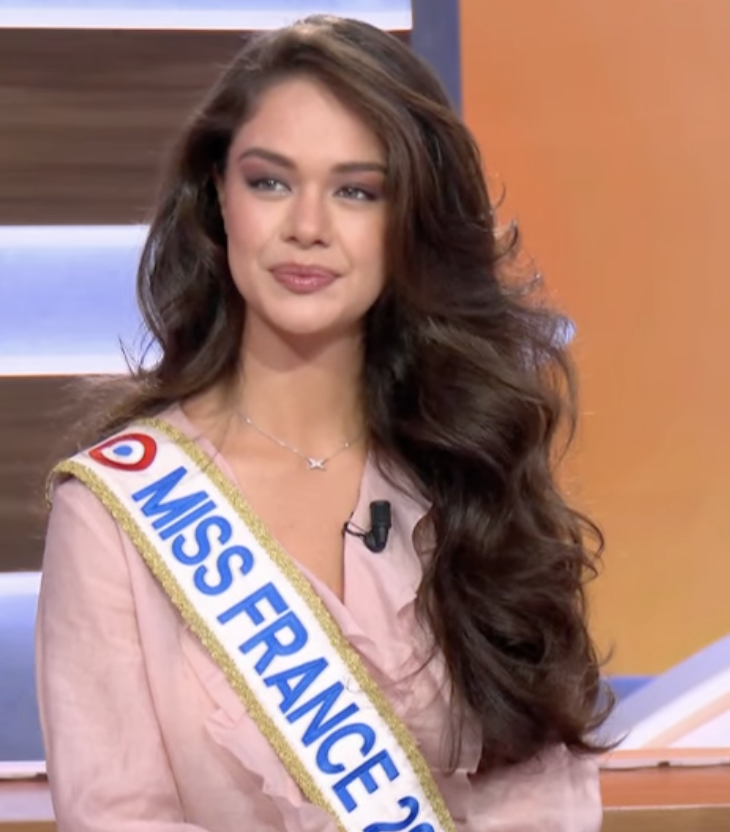
- Hinaupoko Devèze, Miss France 2026
- Date: 6 December 2025
- Presenters: Jean-Pierre Foucault
- Venue: Zénith d'Amiens, Amiens, Hauts-de-France
- Broadcaster: TF1; TF1+
- Entrants: 30
- Placements: 12
- Withdrawals: Saint Martin and Saint Barthélemy
- Returns: New Caledonia
- Winner: Hinaupoko Devèze (French Polynesia) Tahiti

Miss France 2026 was the 96th edition of the Miss France pageant, held on 6 December 2025 at the Zénith d'Amiens in Amiens, Hauts-de-France. Angélique Angarni-Filopon of Martinique crowned Hinaupoko Devèze of Tahiti as her successor at the end of the event.

The 2026 edition marked the first edition since the departure of former national director Cindy Fabre in January 2025, while Camille Cerf will fulfill some of Fabre's previous duties as the official godmother of Miss France 2026.

== Background ==
=== Location ===
In March 2025, the French newspaper Le Populaire du Centre reported that Limoges, the capital of the Haute-Vienne department in Limousin, would apply to host the 2026 edition of the pageant at the Zénith Limoges Métropole. The newspaper also cited Nice in the Alpes-Maritimes department of Provence-Alpes-Côte d'Azur (PACA) and Dijon in the Côte-d'Or department of Burgundy as two other cities applying to host the pageant, with ten cities in total entering the bidding process. Sarah Gentil, the deputy mayor of Limoges for event planning, confirmed that Limoges had been unsuccessfully bidding to host the competition for several years, and that a final decision on the host city would be made in June 2025.

On 2 October 2025, it was announced that the pageant would be held on 6 December 2025 at the Zénith d'Amiens in Amiens, Hauts-de-France. Amiens is the capital of the Somme department in the region of Picardy, and it would be the first time that the city hosts the Miss France competition. On 24 October, it was announced that the overseas trip would be held in Martinique. The contestants visited Martinique for a variety of events, before traveling to Amiens to begin rehearsals.

=== Selection of contestants ===
The 2026 contestants were selected through regional pageants, held between June and October 2025.

The 2026 edition saw the return of New Caledonia, which withdrew from Miss France 2025 due to the 2024 New Caledonia unrest. Saint Martin and Saint Barthélemy, which competes on a biennial basis, withdrew from the competition in line with their typical schedule of only competing every other year.

== Results ==
Result	Contestant
Miss France 2026	(French Polynesia) Tahiti – Hinaupoko Devèze
1st Runner-Up	New Caledonia – Juliette Collet
2nd Runner-Up	Normandy – Victoire Dupuis
3rd Runner-Up	Guadeloupe – Naomi Torrent
4th Runner-Up	Roussillon – Déborah Adelin-Chabal
Top 12 (Note: The top 12 semifinalists are listed in the order that they placed according to the official results.)	(Languedoc-Roussillon) Languedoc – Lou Lambert (5th Runner-Up); Auvergne – Alice De Lima Guimaraes (6th Runner-Up); Île-de-France – Mareva Michel; Champagne-Ardenne – Ynès Lallemand; (Nice) Côte d'Azur – Luna Maiolino; Limousin – Aloïce Sejotte; Picardy – Emma Boivin

=== Special awards ===
Prize	Contestant
General Culture Award	Auvergne – Alice De Lima Guimaraes (18/20) (Note: The General Culture Award is given to the contestant with the highest score on the general culture exam, which tests contestants' grasp of topics such as history, politics, current events, and pop culture. Miss Auvergne received the highest score of 18 and was thus given the award.)
Best Regional Costume	(French Guiana) Guyane – Alicia Mertosetiko (Note: The costume was created by James Paris.)
Camaraderie Award	New Caledonia – Juliette Collet
Catwalk Award	Alsace – Julie Decroix
Eloquence Award	Champagne-Ardenne – Ynès Lallemand

=== Scoring ===
==== Preliminaries ====
A jury composed of partners (internal and external) of the Miss France Company selected 12 contestants to advance to the semi-finals during an interview that took place on 3 December. The jury included the following individuals, in addition to an executive from TF1, two additional representatives of the Miss France Company, and a representative of Amiens.

- Frédéric Gilbert – president of the Miss France Company
- Eve Gilles – Miss France 2024 from Nord-Pas-de-Calais
- Stéphane Jarny – Miss France artistic director
- Marine Lorphelin – Miss France 2013 from Burgundy
- Fabien Provost – Miss France hairdresser

==== Top 12 ====
In the top 12, a 50/50 split vote between the official jury and voting public selected five contestants to advance to the top five. Each contestant was awarded an overall score of 1 to 12 from the jury and public, and the five contestants with the highest combined scores advanced to the top five. The contestants with the sixth and seventh highest combined scores were afterwards designated as the fifth and sixth runners-up, respectively, despite not advancing in the competition. In the case of a tie, the jury vote prevailed.

Contestant	Public	Jury	Total
(French Polynesia) Tahiti	12	12	24
New Caledonia	11	10	21
Roussillon	6	11	17
Normandy	8	8	16
Guadeloupe	10	5	15
(Languedoc-Roussillon) Languedoc	3	10	13
Auvergne	9	2	11
Île-de-France	2	8	10
Champagne-Ardenne	5	5	10
(Nice) Côte d'Azur	1	8	9
Limousin	4	5	9
Picardy	7	1	8

==== Top five ====
In the top five, a 50/50 split vote between the official jury and voting public determined which contestant was declared Miss France. Each contestant was ranked from first to fifth by the jury and public, and the two scores were combined to create a total score. In the case of a tie, the public vote prevailed.

#	Candidate	Public	Jury	Total
1	(French Polynesia) Tahiti	5	4	9
2	New Caledonia	4	5	9
3	Normandy	3	2	5
4	Guadeloupe	2	2	4
5	Roussillon	1	3	4

== Pageant ==
In July 2025, Frédéric Gilbert of the Miss France Company announced that the 2026 edition would see the return of 12 contestants being selected to advance to the semi-finals; since Miss France 2020, 15 contestants had been selected. On 7 November, it was announced that the theme for the competition would be le voyage des Miss (English: The Misses' voyage), with competition rounds being inspired by voyages to various points in time and the world.

The competition opened with an introduction performance, featuring guest appearances from Sylvie Tellier, Élodie Gossuin, Laury Thilleman, and Angélique Angarni-Filopon. The 30 contestants were then separated into three groups, each consisting of ten contestants, with each group taking part in an initial presentation round. The three presentation rounds were themed after Asia, the future, and classical antiquity, respectively. Afterwards, the 30 contestants presented their regional costumes, created by local designers from their home regions, in a round featuring the Republican Guard. The 30 contestants subsequently participated in the one-piece swimsuit round, inspired by flight attendants and featuring another guest appearance from Angarni-Filopon.

After that, the top 12 was announced by Mareva Galanter, Diane Leyre, Gossuin, Thilleman, Mareva Georges, and Rachel Legrain-Trapani. The top 12 subsequently competed in an evening gown round, inspired by the 1940s, and a two-piece swimsuit round, inspired by several different decades of swimwear. Afterwards, the top five was announced, followed by Angarni-Filopon's final walk and interview. The top five then appeared in their ball gowns, in a round inspired by a voyage to a dreamworld, after which they answered their final questions posed to them by Georges, Malika Ménard, Amandine Petit, Indira Ampiot, and Maëva Coucke. After the final question round, the final results were revealed.

=== Judges ===
On 7 November, Camille Cerf was announced as the first member of the jury and as the official godmother of the winner of the Miss France 2026 competition, with the rest of the jury announced on 24 November.

- Michèle Bernier (President of the Jury) – actress and comedian
- Bruce Toussaint – journalist and presenter
- Camille Cerf – Miss France 2015 from Nord-Pas-de-Calais
- Philippe Caverivière – author and comedian
- Axelle Saint-Cirel – opera singer
- Tom Villa – actor and comedian
- Sally – influencer and journalist

== Contestants ==
The following 30 contestants competed:

Region	Contestant	Age (Note: Ages at the time of the pageant)	Height	Hometown	Placement	Notes
Alsace	Julie Decroix	21	1.75 m (5 ft 9 in)	Blotzheim		
Aquitaine	Aïnhoa Lahitete	19	1.73 m (5 ft 8 in)	Hendaye		
Auvergne	Alice De Lima Guimaraes	20	1.72 m (5 ft 7 1/2 in)	Vichy	Top 12	
Brittany	Ninon Crolas	18	1.71 m (5 ft 7 1/2 in)	Ploërmel		
Burgundy	Charlène Laurin	22	1.82 m (5 ft 11 1/2 in)	L'Abergement-Sainte-Colombe		
Centre-Val de Loire	Anna Valero	19	1.74 m (5 ft 8 1/2 in)	Tours		
Champagne-Ardenne	Ynès Lallemand	19	1.71 m (5 ft 7 1/2 in)	Reims	Top 12	
Corsica	Manon Mateus	23	1.70 m (5 ft 7 in)	Sartène		
(Nice) Côte d'Azur	Luna Maiolino	19	1.75 m (5 ft 9 in)	Antibes	Top 12	
Franche-Comté	Jade Cholley	19	1.77 m (5 ft 9 1/2 in)	Saint-Vit		
French Guiana	Alicia Mertosetiko	20	1.72 m (5 ft 7 1/2 in)	Remire-Montjoly		
Guadeloupe	Naomi Torrent	30	1.76 m (5 ft 9 1/2 in)	Basse-Terre	3rd Runner-Up	
Île-de-France	Mareva Michel	22	1.78 m (5 ft 10 in)	Maisons-Laffitte	Top 12	Michel is the cousin of Mexican filmmaker Guillermo del Toro.
(Languedoc-Roussillon) Languedoc	Lou Lambert	20	1.71 m (5 ft 7 1/2 in)	Mauguio	Top 12	
Limousin	Aloïce Sejotte	24	1.74 m (5 ft 8 1/2 in)	Chamboret	Top 12	
Lorraine	Camille L'Étang	23	1.72 m (5 ft 7 1/2 in)	Liverdun		
Martinique	Léaline Patry	21	1.70 m (5 ft 7 in)	Le François		
Mayotte	Kamillat Hervian	24	1.73 m (5 ft 8 in)	Ouangani		
Midi-Pyrénées	Léa Chabrel	24	1.70 m (5 ft 7 in)	Saint-Jean-de-Verges		
New Caledonia	Juliette Collet	23	1.70 m (5 ft 7 in)	Touho	1st Runner-Up	
Nord-Pas-de-Calais	Lola Lacheré	21	1.74 m (5 ft 8 1/2 in)	Berck		
Normandy	Victoire Dupuis	20	1.70 m (5 ft 7 in)	Limésy	2nd Runner-Up	
Pays de la Loire	Lola Winter	19	1.70 m (5 ft 7 in)	Pornichet		
Picardy	Emma Boivin	25	1.78 m (5 ft 10 in)	Beauvais	Top 12	
Poitou-Charentes	Agathe Michelet	26	1.74 m (5 ft 8 1/2 in)	Saint-Sulpice-de-Royan		
Provence	Julie Zitouni	26	1.73 m (5 ft 8 in)	Marseille		
Réunion	Priya Padavatan	20	1.70 m (5 ft 7 in)	Bras-Panon		Padavatan is the niece of politician Jean-Hugues Ratenon.
Rhône-Alpes	Noémie Baiamonte	21	1.70 m (5 ft 7 in)	Replonges		
Roussillon	Déborah Adelin-Chabal	18	1.75 m (5 ft 9 in)	Cabestany	4th Runner-Up	Adelin-Chabal is the cousin of former rugby union player Sébastien Chabal.
(French Polynesia) Tahiti	Hinaupoko Devèze	23	1.82 m (5 ft 11 1/2 in)	Māhina	Miss France 2026	

== Leaked Snapchat video controversy ==
The day after the competition, a leaked video was posted by French gossip blogger Aqababe featuring Miss Aquitaine 2025, Aïnhoa Lahitete. In the video, filmed after the announcement of the top 12 during the show, Lahitete looked visibly upset due to her exclusion from the semi-finals and made comments such as "Sorry, but what is this Top 12? I don't mean to be a sore loser, but what is this Top 12?". Later, Miss Provence 2025, Julie Zitouni, also appeared. Lahitete asked Zitouni her thoughts on the top 12, to which Zitouni responded that the 12 semi-finalists were "just a bunch of whores".

The video, which had been posted on Lahitete's private Snapchat story, received significant media attention in France and widespread condemnation for unsportsmanlike conduct towards Lahitete and Zitouni's fellow contestants. Both Lahitete and Zitouni posted apologies for the video onto their social media accounts, while their regional pageant organizations both posted statements denouncing their comments. Both in her statement and during an interview with La Provence, Zitouni claimed that her comment had been intended as a joke to cheer up Lahitete and the other contestants who were not selected for the top 12, and that she herself had told the Miss France Company not to include her in the top 12 as she realized she did not want to become Miss France. Zitouni also criticized Lahitete for not informing her that the video would be posted anywhere, and for largely shifting the blame onto her in her published apology. Pageant winner Hinaupoko Devèze was asked about her response to the controversy, to which she denounced the online harassment towards Lahitete and Zitouni in the aftermath of the video's publication, and claimed she had nothing else to say following the publicized apologies of both contestants. Journalist Clément Garin later reported that an anonymous source stated that the comments made by Lahitete and Zitouni were in response to two contestants accused of fatphobia being included in the top 12.

On 9 December, both the Miss Aquitaine Committee and Miss Provence Committee announced in a joint statement that Lahitete and Zitouni had been stripped of their regional pageant titles due to the comments made in the video. The following day, it was reported that Lahitete had filed a lawsuit against Aqababe and the individuals who leaked the video, citing invasion of privacy and non-consensual dissemination of private content. On 11 December, it was reported that Zitouni would also file a lawsuit against Aqababe, citing defamation for accusing Zitouni of not being selected for the top 12 after being caught smoking marijuana in her hotel room, and against Twitter, citing the online harassment that she had been subjected to by anonymous users. During an appearance on the France 2 talk show Quelle époque ! with Devèze, Miss France Company president Frédéric Gilbert stated that Lahitete and Zitouni had received over 30,000 insulting messages on social media in the aftermath of the controversy, and condemned the online harassment both had been subjected to.
