= Miss Île-de-France =

Beauty contest

- Type: Beauty pageant
- Headquarters: Île-de-France, France
- Qualifies for: Miss France
- Regional director: Laure Mattioli
- Language: French
- Website: www.miss-iledefrance.fr

Miss Île-de-France is a French beauty pageant which selects a representative for the Miss France national competition from the region of Île-de-France. Women representing the region under various different titles have competed at Miss France since 1930, although the Miss Île-de-France title was not used regularly until 1984.

The current Miss Île-de-France is Camilla Alash, who was crowned Miss Île-de-France 2026 on 20 September 2026. Sixteen women from Île-de-France have been crowned Miss France, the most of any region:

- Jacqueline Bertin-Lequien, who was crowned Miss France 1933, competing as Miss Paris
- Simone Barillier, who was crowned Miss France 1934, competing as Miss Paris
- Gisèle Préville, who was crowned Miss France 1935, competing as Miss Paris, following the resignation of the original winner
- Ginette Catriens, who was crowned Miss France 1939
- Jacqueline Donny, who was crowned Miss France 1948, competing as Miss Paris
- Juliette Figueras, who was crowned Miss France 1949, competing as Miss Paris
- Maryse Delort, who was crowned Miss France 1950, competing as Miss Paris
- Véronique Zuber, who was crowned Miss France 1955, competing as Miss Paris
- Muguette Fabris, who was crowned Miss France 1963
- Michelle Beaurain, who was crowned Miss France 1970, competing as Miss Paris
- Chantal Bouvier de Lamotte, who was crowned Miss France 1972, competing as Miss Paris, and later resigned
- Brigitte Konjovic, who was crowned Miss France 1978, competing as Miss Paris, following the resignation of the original winner
- Isabelle Turpault, who was crowned Miss France 1983, competing as Miss Paris, and later dethroned
- Valérie Pascale, who was crowned Miss France 1986, competing as Miss Paris
- Patricia Spehar, who was crowned Miss France 1997, competing as Miss Paris
- Diane Leyre, who was crowned Miss France 2022

== Results summary ==
- Miss France: Jacqueline Bertin-Lequien (1933; Miss Paris); Simone Barillier (1934; Miss Paris); Ginette Catriens (1939); Jacqueline Donny (1947; Miss Paris); Juliette Figueras (1948; Miss Paris); Maryse Delort (1949; Miss Paris); Véronique Zuber (1954; Miss Paris); Muguette Fabris (1962); Michelle Beaurain (1969; Miss Paris); Chantal Bouvier de Lamotte (1971; Miss Paris; resigned); Isabelle Turpault (1982; Miss Paris; dethroned); Valérie Pascale (1985; Miss Paris); Patricia Spehar (1996; Miss Paris); Diane Leyre (2021)
- 1st Runner-Up: Gisèle Préville (1935; Miss Paris; later Miss France); Pierrette Frauen (1946; Miss Paris); Danielle Génault (1953); Gisèle Gallois (1957); Brigitte Konjovic (1977; Miss Paris; later Miss France); Pamela Semmache (1998; Miss Paris); Ornella Verrechia (2002); Sophie Ducasse (2005)
- 2nd Runner-Up: Josiane Bouffenie (1973; Miss Val-de-Marne); Frédérique Laffond (1976); Lison Di Martino (2017)
- 3rd Runner-Up: Muriel Sellier (1981); Amélie Kervran (2004; Miss Paris); Krystel Norden (2006; Miss Paris)
- 4th Runner-Up: Chantal Braham (1978; Miss Paris); Béatrice Burié (1979; Miss Paris); Isabelle Da Silva (1993; Miss Paris); Sabine Hossenbaccus (2010)
- 5th Runner-Up: Christine Vogel (1986)
- 6th Runner-Up: Françoise Bocci (1976; Miss Paris); Julie-Chloé Mougeolle (2003; Miss Paris); Alice Quérette (2018); Lara Lourenço (2020)
- Top 12/Top 15: Sophie Rousseau (1986; Miss Paris); Nathalie Nicolov (1987); Karine Bohin (1989); Delphine Vignay (1990); Marie-Christine Prudhomme (1991; Miss Paris); Agnès Boudou (1994; Miss Paris); Lætitia La Spina (1997; Miss Paris); Fany Trueba (1998); Céline Lambert (1999; Miss Paris); Émilie François (2001); Isabelle Lamant (2002; Miss Paris); Rebecca Andry (2006); Cyrielle Roidot (2007; Miss Paris); Margaux Savarit (2014); Meggy Pyaneeandee (2016); Évelyne de Larichaudy (2019); Elena Faliez (2023); Mareva Michel (2025)

== Gallery ==
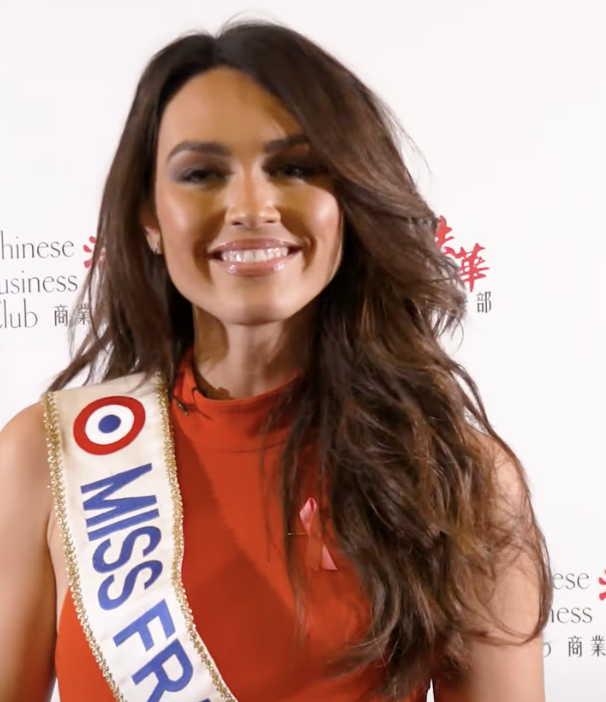
Miss Île-de-France 2021 and Miss France 2022
Diane Leyre

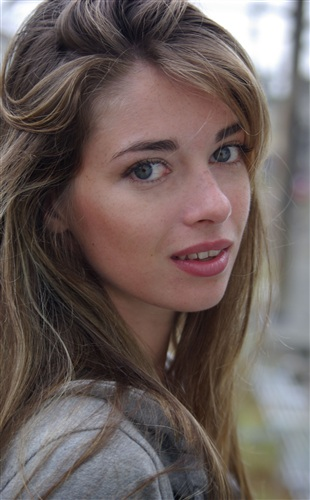
Miss Paris 2008
Sarah Barzyk

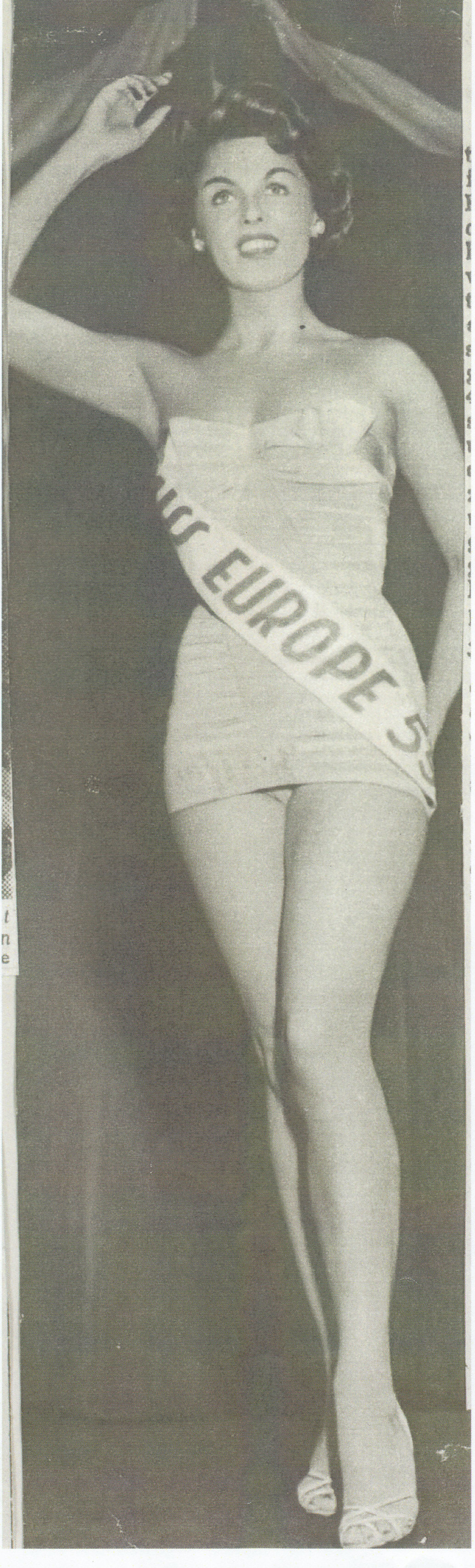
Miss Île-de-France 1953
Danielle Génault

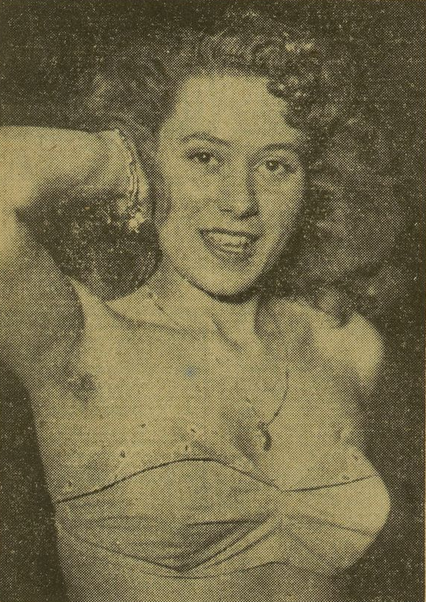
Miss Paris 1949 and Miss France 1950
Maryse Delort

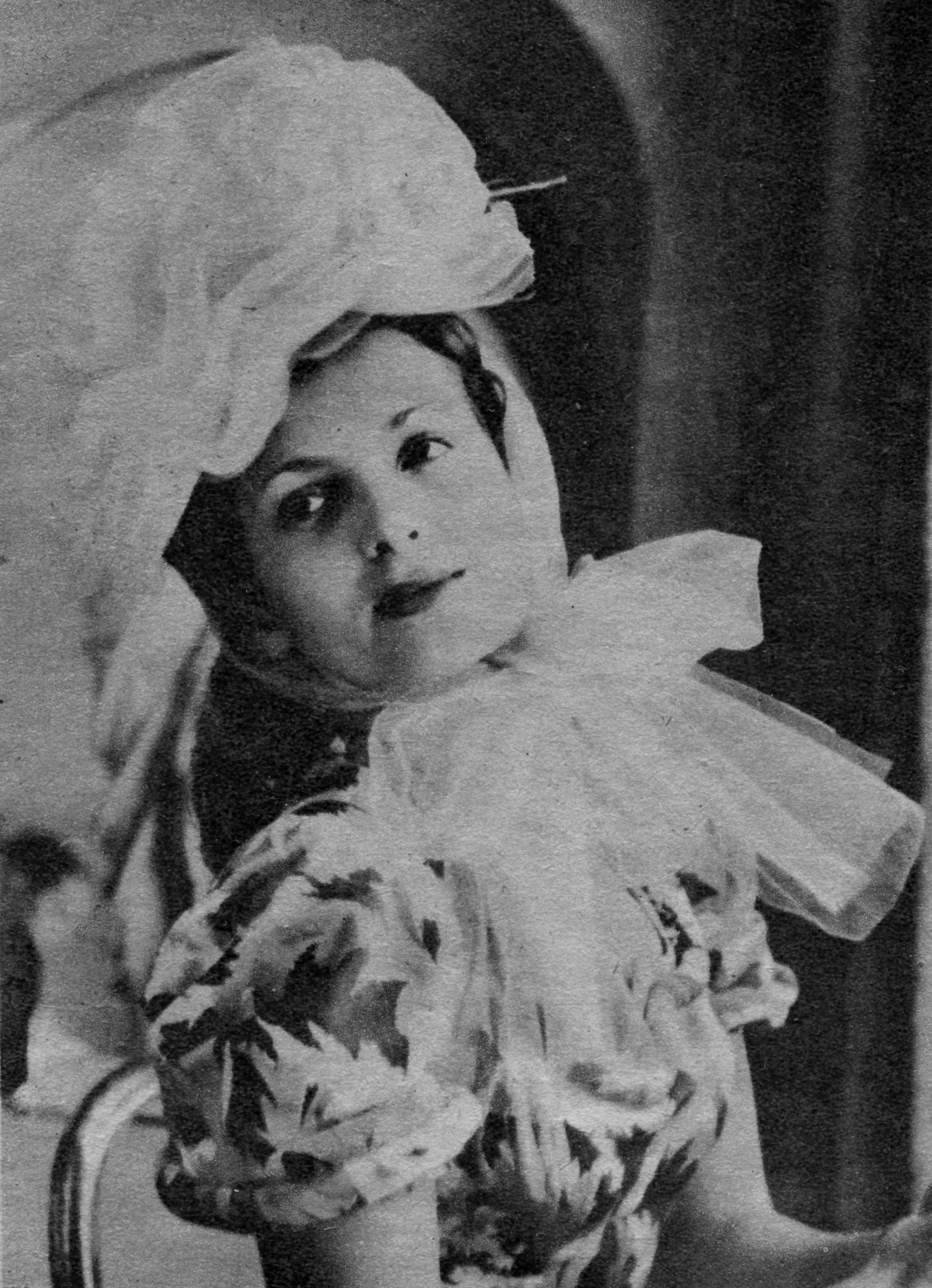
Miss Paris 1948 and Miss France 1949
Juliette Figueras

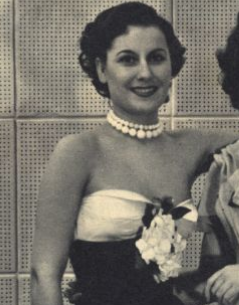
Miss Paris 1947 and Miss France 1948
Jacqueline Donny

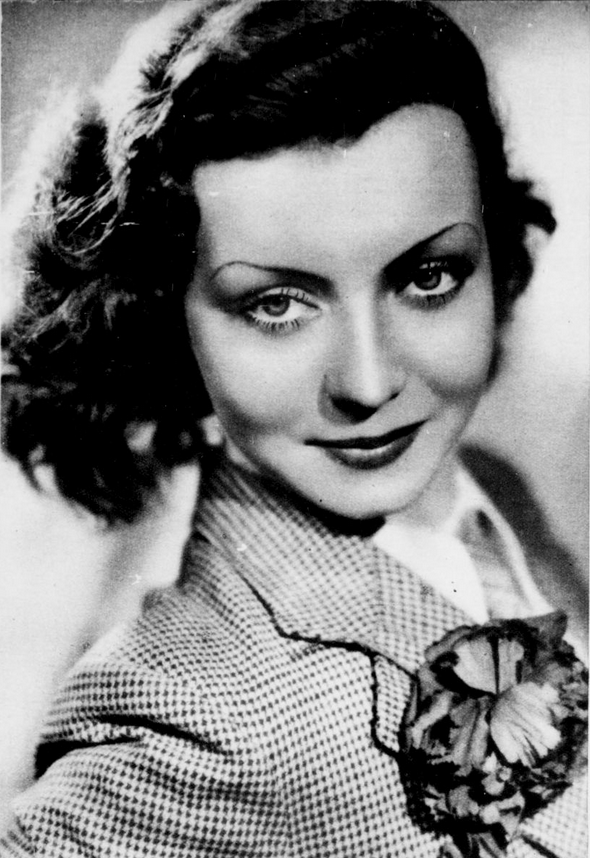
Miss Paris 1935 and Miss France 1935
Gisèle Préville

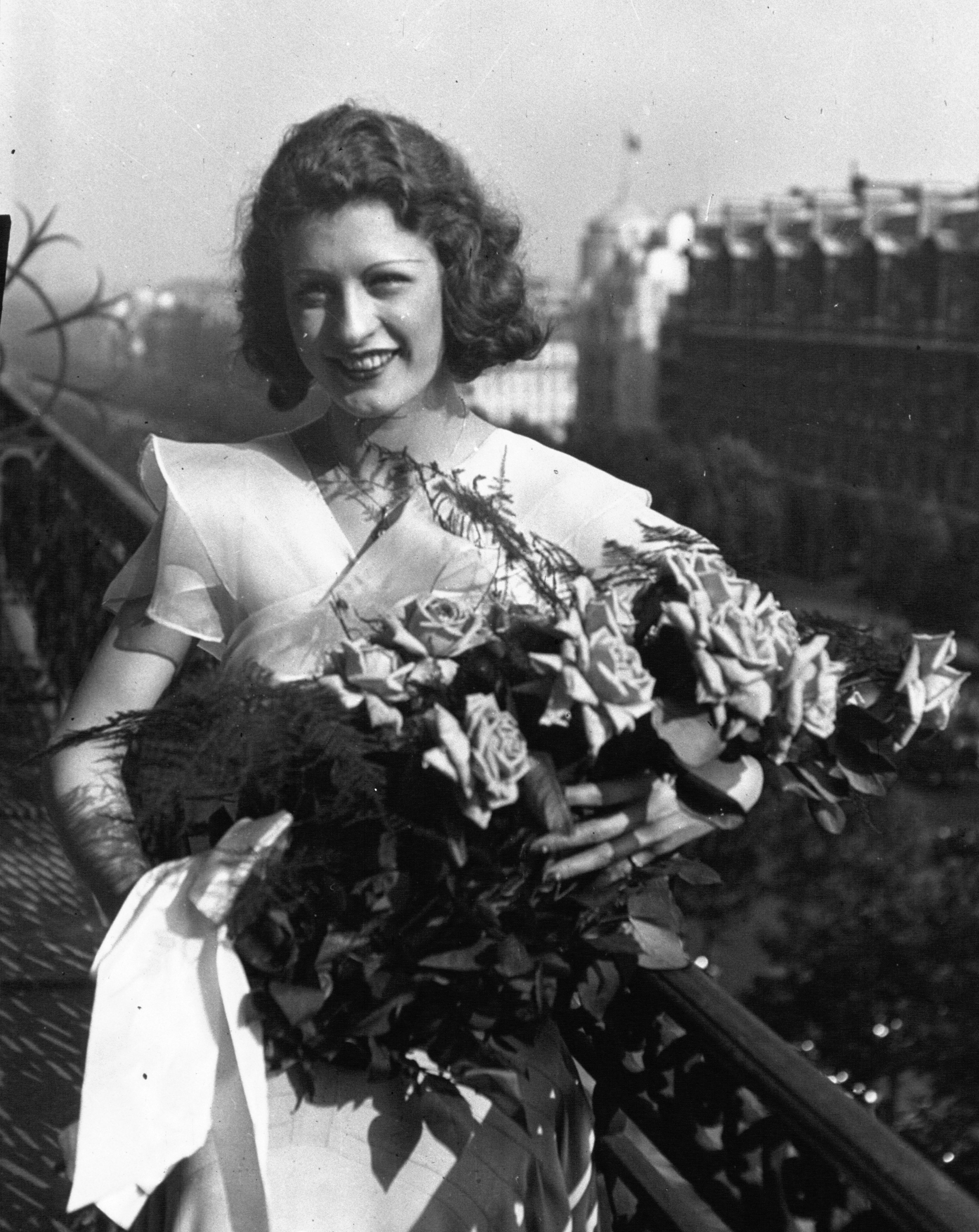
Miss Paris 1934 and Miss France 1934
Simone Barillier

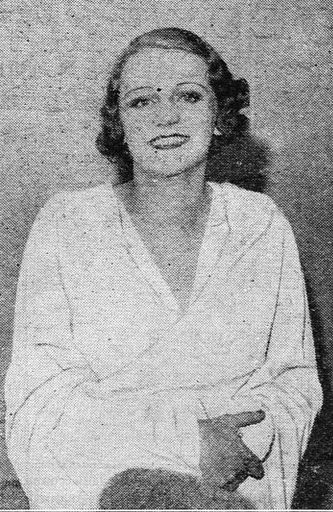
Miss Paris 1933 and Miss France 1933
Jacqueline Bertin-Lequien

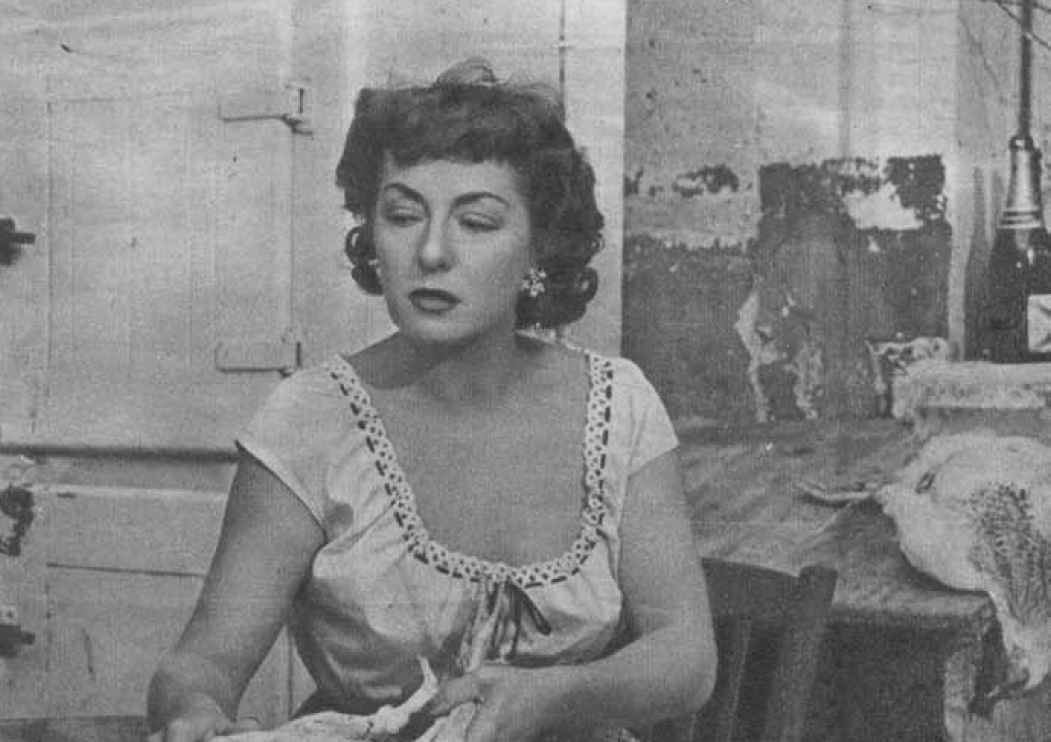
Miss Paris 1930
Viviane Romance

== Titleholders ==
Year	Name	Age (Note: Ages at the time of Miss France)	Height	Hometown	Miss France placement	Notes
2026	Camilla Alash	23	1.81 m (5 ft 11 1/2 in)	Clichy	TBD	
2025	Mareva Michel	22	1.78 m (5 ft 10 in)	Maisons-Laffitte	Top 12	Michel is the cousin of Mexican filmmaker Guillermo del Toro.
2024	Julie Dupont	26	1.76 m (5 ft 9 1/2 in)	Puteaux		
2023	Elena Faliez	28	1.74 m (5 ft 8 1/2 in)	Paris	Top 15	
2022	Adèle Bonnamour	18	1.86 m (6 ft 1 in)	Paris		
2021	Diane Leyre	24	1.77 m (5 ft 9 1/2 in)	Paris	Miss France 2022	Competed at Miss Universe 2023
2020	Lara Lourenço	19	1.71 m (5 ft 7 1/2 in)	Saint-Maur-des-Fossés	Top 15 (6th Runner-Up)	
2019	Évelyne de Larichaudy	23	1.73 m (5 ft 8 in)	Montrouge	Top 15	
2018	Alice Quérette	24	1.76 m (5 ft 9 1/2 in)	Boulogne-Billancourt	Top 12 (6th Runner-Up)	
2017	Lison Di Martino	19	1.72 m (5 ft 7 1/2 in)	La Houssaye-en-Brie	2nd Runner-Up	
2016	Meggy Pyaneeandee	22	1.72 m (5 ft 7 1/2 in)	Le Blanc-Mesnil	Top 12	
2015	Fanny Harcaut	18	1.76 m (5 ft 9 1/2 in)	Créteil		
2014	Margaux Savarit	23	1.76 m (5 ft 9 1/2 in)	Évry	Top 12	
2013	Laetitia Vuillemard	20	1.73 m (5 ft 8 in)	Saint-Germain-lès-Corbeil		
2012	Sabrina Benamara	18	1.73 m (5 ft 8 in)	Paris		
2011	Meggahnn Samson	20	1.80 m (5 ft 11 in)	Paris		
2010	Pauline Darles				Did not compete	Darles was originally crowned Miss Île-de-France 2010, but resigned one month prior to Miss France. She was replaced by her first runner-up, Muzaton, who was later dethroned due to the discovery of an explicit video deemed inappropriate by the Miss France Committee. She was replaced by Hossenbaccus, the second runner-up, less than one week prior to Miss France.
2010	Jessica Muzaton				Did not compete	Darles was originally crowned Miss Île-de-France 2010, but resigned one month prior to Miss France. She was replaced by her first runner-up, Muzaton, who was later dethroned due to the discovery of an explicit video deemed inappropriate by the Miss France Committee. She was replaced by Hossenbaccus, the second runner-up, less than one week prior to Miss France.
2010	Sabine Hossenbaccus	22	1.70 m (5 ft 7 in)	Vitry-sur-Seine	4th Runner-Up	Darles was originally crowned Miss Île-de-France 2010, but resigned one month prior to Miss France. She was replaced by her first runner-up, Muzaton, who was later dethroned due to the discovery of an explicit video deemed inappropriate by the Miss France Committee. She was replaced by Hossenbaccus, the second runner-up, less than one week prior to Miss France.
2009	Lisa Alberici	20	1.78 m (5 ft 10 in)	Valenton		
2008	Pauline Righini	20	1.72 m (5 ft 7 1/2 in)	Puteaux		
2007	Sarah Gernier	20	1.82 m (5 ft 11 1/2 in)	Nanterre		
2006	Rebecca Andry	20	1.79 m (5 ft 10 1/2 in)	Paris	Top 12	
2005	Sophie Ducasse	22	1.80 m (5 ft 11 in)	Châtillon	1st Runner-Up	
2004	Jennifer Perny	22	1.73 m (5 ft 8 in)	Issy-les-Moulineaux		
2003	Ingrid Graziani			Coulommiers		
2002	Ornella Verrechia			Méry-sur-Oise	1st Runner-Up	
2001	Émilie François				Top 12	
2000	Caroline Josse			Chailly-en-Bière		
1999	Sophie Garcia	23	1.79 m (5 ft 10 1/2 in)			
1998	Fany Trueba	19	1.75 m (5 ft 9 in)	Saâcy-sur-Marne	Top 12	
1997	Caroline Boulfroy	19	1.75 m (5 ft 9 in)			
1996	Audrey Legros					
1995	Christel Guignery					
1994	Séverine Palisseau					
1993	Stéphanie Moroni	19		Taverny		
1992	Ganaëlle Pegeot	18				
1991	Nathalie Mars					
1990	Delphine Vignay				Top 12	
1989	Karine Bohin				Top 12	
1988	Nathalie Bianchi					Bianchi was also crowned Miss Côte d'Azur 1987.
1987	Nathalie Nicolov				Top 12	
1986	Christine Vogel				5th Runner-Up	
1985	Christiane Abderrahman					
1984	Marie-Lise Allain					
1981	Muriel Sellier				3rd Runner-Up	
1978	Nicole Prymirski					
1977	Aline Dourneaux					
1976	Frédérique Laffond				2nd Runner-Up	
1972	Martine Fléty					
1970	Michèle Mauger					
1969	Joëlle Goldstein					
1967	Bernadette Houchard					
1966	Nicole Buisson					
1965	Annick Loisel					
1962	Muguette Fabris	22		Châtellerault	Miss France 1963	
1957	Gisèle Gallois				1st Runner-Up	
1953	Danielle Génault				1st Runner-Up	
1952	Anne Merven					
1939	Ginette Catriens	24		Paris	Miss France 1939	

=== Miss Essonne ===
In 1972 and 1976, the department of Essonne crowned its own representative for Miss France.

Year	Name	Age	Height	Hometown	Miss France placement	Notes
1976	Catherine Chailleux					
1972	Catherine Brin					

=== Miss Hauts-de-Seine ===
In 1979, the department of Hauts-de-Seine crowned its own representative for Miss France.

Year	Name	Age	Height	Hometown	Miss France placement	Notes
1979	Pascale Fontanaud					

=== Miss Nogeantais ===
In 1979, the department of Val-de-Marne crowned its own representative for Miss France under the title Miss Nogeantais.

Year	Name	Age	Height	Hometown	Miss France placement	Notes
1979	Véronique Fricot					

=== Miss Paris ===
From the 1930s to 2000s, the city of Paris crowned its own representative for Miss France.

Year	Name	Age	Height	Hometown	Miss France placement	Notes
2009	Kelly Bochenko	23	1.75 m (5 ft 9 in)	Paris		
2008	Sarah Barzyk	19	1.72 m (5 ft 7 1/2 in)	Paris		Barzyk is the daughter of Patricia Barzyk, Miss Jura 1979 and Miss France 1980.
2007	Cyrielle Roidot	24	1.75 m (5 ft 9 in)	Paris	Top 12	
2006	Krystel Norden	24	1.76 m (5 ft 9 1/2 in)	Paris	3rd Runner-Up	
2005	Laura Marchebout	18	1.74 m (5 ft 8 1/2 in)	Paris		
2004	Amélie Kervran	20	1.76 m (5 ft 9 1/2 in)	Paris	3rd Runner-Up	
2003	Julie-Chloé Mougeolle			Paris	Top 12 (6th Runner-Up)	
2002	Isabelle Lamant			Paris	Top 12	
2001	Élodie De Maria			Paris		
2000	Amélie Tessier			Paris		
1999	Céline Lambert	22	1.73 m (5 ft 8 in)	Paris	Top 12	
1998	Pamela Semmache	19	1.79 m (5 ft 10 1/2 in)	Paris	1st Runner-Up	
1997	Lætitia La Spina	20	1.72 m (5 ft 7 1/2 in)	Paris	Top 12	
1996	Patricia Spehar	21	1.80 m (5 ft 11 in)	Paris	Miss France 1997	Competed at Miss Universe 1997 Top 15 at Miss International 1998
1995	Marie-Laure Martinet			Paris		
1994	Agnès Boudou			Paris	Top 12	
1993	Isabelle Da Silva			Paris	4th Runner-Up	
1992	Mylène Deveer	18		Paris		
1991	Marie-Christine Prudhomme				Top 12	
1990	Myriam Nedellec					
1989	Sandrine Turowicz					
1988	Nathalie Pallardy					Pallardy was previously crowned Miss Flanders 1987.
1987	Karine Espallargas					
1986	Sophie Rousseau				Top 12	
1985	Valérie Pascale	17		Paris	Miss France 1986	Pascale is the daughter of Danik Patisson, Miss Paris 1960.
1983	Christine Coste					
1982	Isabelle Turpault			Paris	Miss France 1983 (dethroned)	Turpault was dethroned after it was discovered that she had participated in an erotic photoshoot.
1981	Charlotte Ducamp					
1980	Janine Leroux					
1979	Béatrice Burié				4th Runner-Up	Burié was previously crowned Miss Côte d'Azur in 1977 and 1978.
1978	Chantal Braham				4th Runner-Up	Braham was previously crowned Miss Médoc 1977.
1977	Brigitte Konjovic	18		Paris	1st Runner-Up (later Miss France 1978)	Konjovic was originally the first runner-up, but took over as Miss France 1978 after the original winner resigned.
1976	Françoise Bocci				6th Runner-Up	
1975	Dany Coutelier					Coutelier was previously crowned Miss Flanders 1972.
1972	Patricia Chapuis					
1971	Chantal Bouvier de Lamotte	17		Paris	Miss France 1972 (resigned)	Bouvier de Lamotte resigned her title after falling off a horse and suffering severe injuries.
1970	Nadine Lorcery					
1969	Michelle Beaurain	19		Paris	Miss France 1970	Beaurain was previously crowned Miss Normandy 1968.
1967	Colette Hoche					
1965	Edwige Perrot de Thannberg					
1963	Geneviève Mercier					
1962	Danièle Chevalier					
1960	Danik Patisson					Patisson is the mother of Valérie Pascale, Miss Paris 1985 and Miss France 1986.
1957	Christine Verdy					
1955	Giselle Hauchecorn					
1954	Véronique Zuber	18			Miss France 1955	
1953	Ghislaine Tournieux					
1950	Maria Galland					
1949	Maryse Delort	18		Paris	Miss France 1950	
1948	Juliette Figueras	19		Paris	Miss France 1949	
1947	Jacqueline Donny	20		Paris	Miss France 1948	
1946	Pierrette Frauen				1st Runner-Up	
1935	Gisèle Préville	17		Paris	1st Runner-Up (later Miss France 1935)	Préville was originally the first runner-up, but took over as Miss France 1935 after the original winner resigned.
1934	Simone Barillier	17		Paris	Miss France 1934	
1933	Jacqueline Bertin-Lequien	16		Paris	Miss France 1933	
1930	Viviane Romance	18		Paris		

=== Miss Seine-et-Marne ===
In 1976, 1977, and 1978, the department of Seine-et-Marne crowned its own representative for Miss France.

Year	Name	Age	Height	Hometown	Miss France placement	Notes
1978	Claire Rousseau					
1977	Éliane Ambroglio					
1976	Laurence Delaplace					

=== Miss Seine-Saint-Denis ===
In 1979, the department of Seine-Saint-Denis crowned its own representative for Miss France.

Year	Name	Age	Height	Hometown	Miss France placement	Notes
1979	Sylvie Zucchi					

=== Miss Val-d'Oise ===
In 1967 and 1979, the department of Val-d'Oise crowned its own representative for Miss France.

Year	Name	Age	Height	Hometown	Miss France placement	Notes
1979	Isabelle Moulin					
1967	Claudine Soret					

=== Miss Val-de-Marne ===
In 1972, 1973, and 1979, the department of Val-de-Marne crowned its own representative for Miss France.

Year	Name	Age	Height	Hometown	Miss France placement	Notes
1979	Fabienne Lecher					
1973	Josiane Bouffenie				2nd Runner-Up	
1972	Michèle Rateau					

=== Miss Yvelines ===
In 1977, the department of Yvelines crowned its own representative for Miss France.

Year	Name	Age	Height	Hometown	Miss France placement	Notes
1977	Catherine Chaudezon					
