= Aqababe =

French influencer and gossip blogger

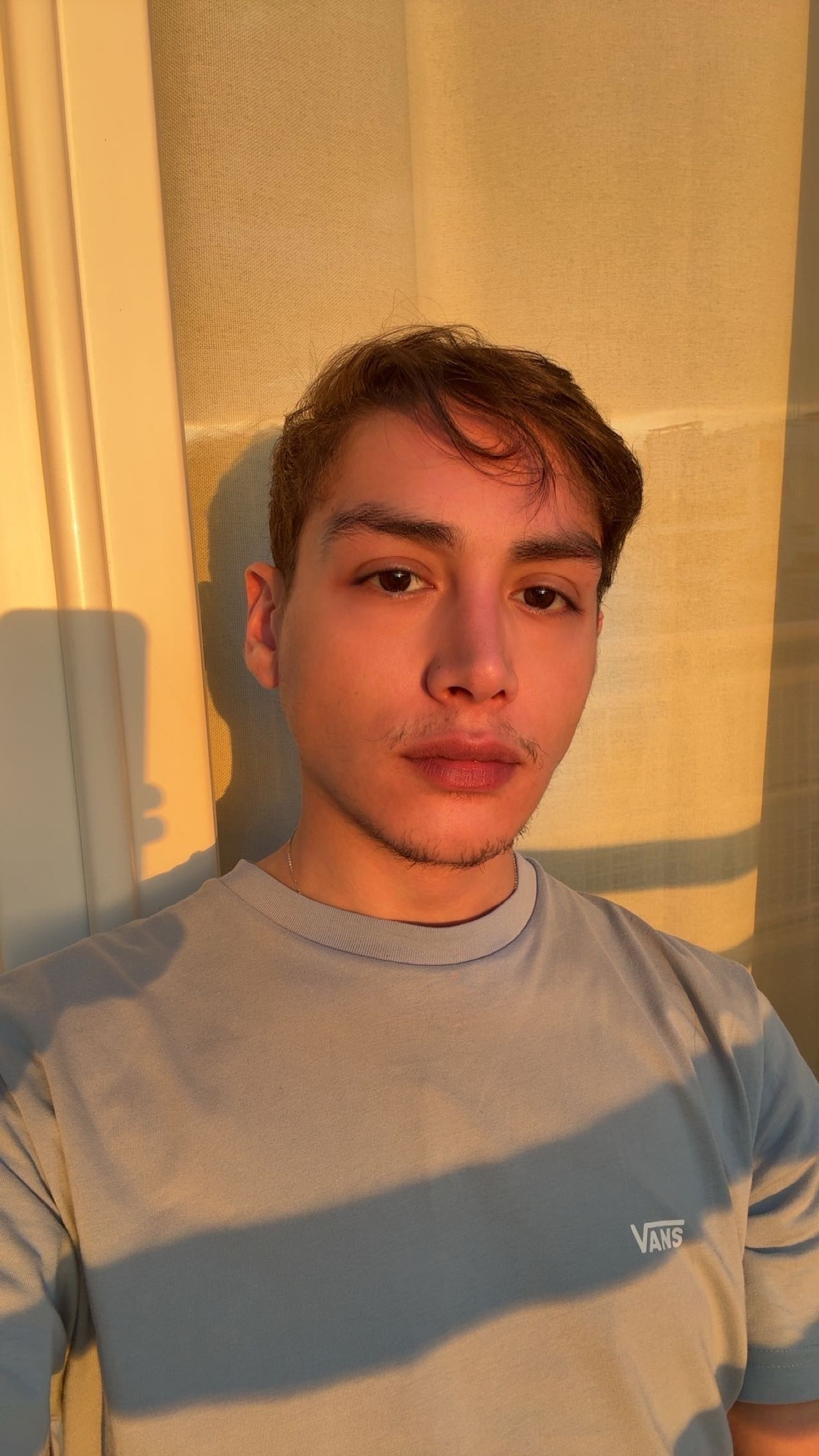
- Born: Aniss Zitouni; 15 April 1998 (age 28); Lyon, France
- Occupations: Influencer, Blogger
- Website: www.xoxoaqababe.com

Aqababe (pronounced Aqua-Babe), whose real name is Aniss Zitouni, (born on 15 April 1998) is a French influencer and gossip blogger. He gained notoriety on social media by publishing information and exclusives, often at times turning out to disputed and/or being proven false, concerning public figures, particularly those from reality TV. His methods have earned him two court convictions and, in 2025, several complaints for deceptive business practices, fraud, breach of trust and harassment.

== Early life and career ==
Aniss Zitouni was born on 15 April 1998 in Lyon, France. He became known on social media under the pseudonym Aqababe.

=== Debut and show on TeleStar Play (2018–2020) ===
Aqababe began to gain attention on social media in 2018 by sharing various scoops and information about celebrities, thus attracting a growing number of subscribers. He sparked controversy by publishing intimate photos of reality TV contestant Astrid Nelsia.

In 2020, he joined the paid video platform TeleStar Play, where he launched his own program called Aqashow. The show features interviews and confessions with personalities from the world of reality television.

=== Search for Xavier Dupont de Ligonnès (2025) ===
In April 2025, he launched a search effort to find Xavier Dupont de Ligonnès, a man wanted since April 2011, suspected of murdering his wife and their four children. A few days later, he claimed to have found him, which the prosecutor's office denied, calling the mission a "vast hoax". The investigators say they are "annoyed" by this approach, which they believe employs questionable methods and wastes their time.

=== Breach of medical confidentiality concerning Werenoi (2025) ===
On 16 May 2025, he reported the hospitalization of rapper Werenoi while disclosing the reasons for this hospitalization without the consent of the rapper and his family. This behavior was denounced by several observers as a possible breach of medical confidentiality, to which the rapper, who died the day after the influencer's posts, was entitled to.

=== Accusing Iris Mittenaere of cheating and deception (2025) ===
In June 2025, Aqababe alleged that Iris Mittenaere had been repeatedly cheating on several of her partners. A few hours later, Diego El Glaoui posted a statement on Instagram confirming Aqababe's allegations. According to Aqababe, Mittenaere allegedly had a double relationship with Bruno Pelat and Antoine Dupont and then was in a relationship with Diego El Glaoui, Paul Mirabel, and Valentin Lucas all at the same time.

Aqababe also shares an audio message from Diego El Glaoui in which El Glaoui can be heard responding to Mittenaere. El Glaoui is also heard in the audio stating that Mittenaere threatens to put a "MeToo" allegation onto him, if he reveals that she cheated on him with Valentin Lucas for four months.

=== Erroneous announcement of Brigitte Bardot's death (2025) ===
On 22 October 2025, Aqababe announced the death of actress Brigitte Bardot on his social media, claiming that exclusive sources have confirmed to him the purchase of the coffin in which the French film actress will rest, and that it is only a matter of time before the mainstream media spread the information.

On the same day, around 10:30 p.m., Brigitte Bardot reacted in a post on X, saying she was the victim of fake news, and asked who the "idiot" was who announced her death. Despite the post from the person in question, the blogger persisted in declaring her dead. Two days later, Aqababe acknowledged his mistake and apologized.

=== Leaking private Snapchat videos of Miss France 2026 contestants (2025) ===
On 7 December 2025, the day after the Miss France 2026 contest, Aqababe leaked a private Snapchat video filmed by Miss Aquitaine 2025, Aïnhoa Lahitete, after the Top 12 semifinalists were announced. In the video in question, Lahitete was looking visibly upset in the video while stating "Sorry, but what is this Top 12? I don't mean to be a sore loser, but what is this Top 12?". Then when Miss Provence 2025, Julie Zitouni, appeared in the video, she was asked by Lahitete on what her thoughts on the Top 12 to which Zitouni stated that the Top 12 semifinalists were "just a bunch of whores". Aqababe would also accuse Zitouni of not making the Top 12 due to being caught smoking marijuana by the Miss France Company, an allegation to which Zitouni denies. On 13 December 2025, Miss France Company president Frédéric Gilbert appeared on the France 2 talk show What A Time! (Quelle époque !) with eventual winner of the 2026 Miss France contest, Miss Tahiti 2025: Hinaupoko Devèze, and stated that Lahitete and Zitouni had received over 30,000 insulting messages on social media in the aftermath of the controversy, and condemned the online harassment both had been subjected to.

== Legal Issues ==
=== JeremstarGate controversy (2018–2023) ===
On 16 January 2018, Aqababe published an intimate video of the blogger and columnist Jeremstar. At the same time, he accused Pascal Cardonna, a close associate of Jeremstar, of making explicit sexual propositions to underage boys. Aqababe published several recordings and excerpts of conversations to support his accusations, claiming that Pascal Cardonna, nicknamed "Babybel," used Jeremstar as an intermediary to approach teenagers. Various news outlets, in France, have dubbed the controversy as "JeremstarGate".

The affair sent shockwaves through the influencer community. Jeremstar, although denying any involvement, had left the show The Sunday Earthlings! (Les Terriens du dimanche !) on C8 and deleted his social media accounts. Pascal Cardonna, for his part, was the subject of several complaints.

Following the JeremstarGate affair, Jeremstar filed a complaint against Aqababe. On 3 June 2022, a press release published on Jeremstar's Instagram account announced Aqababe's conviction for defamation and public insults, with the obligation to pay €12,000 in damages. On 7 June 2022, Aqababe published an open letter on Instagram in which he apologized and announced he would stop publishing scoops about reality TV personalities.

=== BerdahGate (2019) ===
In April 2019, he became involved in a new controversy, dubbed "BerdahGate", where he published information about questionable practices in the influencer world, particularly targeting Magali Berdah, founder of the Shauna Events agency. He accused her of covering up for influencers involved in consumer scams. This affair had gained significant media attention with the intervention of rapper Booba, who also attacked Magali Berdah and Shauna Events. Aqababe would also go on to release documents and testimonies aimed at proving financial irregularities and fraud affecting consumers.

After the controversy, Magali Berdah, founder of the Shauna Events agency, stated that she was the victim of a smear campaign orchestrated by Aqababe, where she alleged that he disseminated defamatory information, including allegations of extramarital affairs and money laundering, which Berdah herself, claims is untrue. In response to these allegations, Magali Berdah filed a complaint for extortion, blackmail, defamation, public lynching and incitement to hatred. She also claimed that Aqababe had demanded €180,000 from her to stop his defamatory publications.

On 27 April 2019, Aqababe was arrested by law enforcement for cyberbullying. During his arrest, he was informed of the complaints filed against him by Magali Berdah.

=== Maes-Aqababe Case (2018–2022) ===
In October 2022, compromising videos circulated on social media, showing blogger Aqababe being subjected to physical violence. These images, filmed in 2019, implicated the rapper Maes and several accomplices. Aqababe claimed he was kidnapped, taken to an unknown location and beaten, while his attackers hurled homophobic insults at him.

The conflict between the two men began in 2018, when the blogger claimed that Maes was in a homosexual relationship. The rapper denies the allegations and goes to Aqababe's supposed home to confront him, without success. A year later, he finally finds the blogger and violently attacks him.

The case resurfaced when former reality TV contestant Dylan Thiry was accused of possessing and distributing these videos. The leak of the images caused a wave of indignation and prompted many internet users to report the matter to the PHAROS service. The police have opened an investigation, but Maes remains silent in the face of the accusations, citing a lack of sufficient evidence to bring charges.

=== Assault at his home and complaint filed against unknown persons and Poupette Kenza (2023) ===
On 21 November 2023, Aqababe stated that he was the victim of an attack at his home in Hauts-de-Seine. According to his account, three hooded and armed men burst into his home after ringing his doorbell. One of them struck him several times with the butt of a handgun, leaving him with a head wound and facial bruises. The attackers fled after accidentally triggering an emergency call on his phone.

Following this event, Aqababe filed a complaint against X for "aggravated violence" and against the influencer Poupette Kenza, whose real name is Kenza Benchrif, for "death threats". He accused her of posting threatening messages against him and sharing his address on social media, which may have facilitated the attack he suffered.

The case gained media attention when Aqababe testified on the set of prime-time talk-showTouche pas à mon poste !, where he broke down in tears while recounting his assault. He expressed his shock and fear of the repercussions, while affirming that he does not intend to stop his blogging activity.

=== Conviction for death threats against Guillaume Genton (2023–2024) ===
On 21 November 2023, Aqababe claimed to have been attacked at his home by three armed individuals and accused Poupette Kenza of being responsible. The following day, he appeared on the set of prime-time talk-show Touche pas à mon poste !. During his appearance on the show, a tense exchange took place between him and the commentator Guillaume Genton, the latter believed that the blogger had a "business that could cause problems." Aqababe then left the set in tears at the end of the exchange.

A few days after the show, Guillaume Genton received anonymous death threats via messages. The judicial investigation led back to Aqababe, who confessed to the crimes during his time in police custody. He was placed under judicial supervision and tried on 18 January 2024 by the Nanterre judicial court. He was sentenced to four months in prison, suspended for eighteen months, with probation, and prohibited from contacting Guillaume Genton and his partner. He is also required to pay them €2,800 in compensation and to undergo psychological care as well as treatment related to narcotics.

=== Fraud case (since 2025) ===
In 2025, Aqababe was accused of fraud, breach of trust and deceptive business practices by several former clients. Five victims have filed a complaint, accusing him of failing to honor his commercial commitments after payment, including promotions on his social media or his website xoxoaqababe.com. The plaintiffs denounce manipulation, intimidation and a lack of response to their requests for reimbursement. Aqababe, supported by his lawyer, downplayed the events, describing them as "isolated" and "anecdotal," and highlighting the success of numerous other partnerships.

=== Nekfeu's ex-wife files a complaint (since 2025) ===
On the evening of 8 October 2025, Aqababe published a short statement on his social media accounts on Instagram and X where he claimed that the rapper Nekfeu was being financially blackmailed by his ex-wife. Aqababe alleged that the ex-wife premeditated their meeting with the sole purpose of seducing him, had deliberately became pregnant without her husband's consent, lied about accusations of marital rape and child abuse, and is trying to extort money from him — between “1 and 3 million euros” according to Aqababe — to get revenge for the divorce requested and obtained by the artist. The very next day, Nekfeu's ex-wife filed a complaint against Aqababe (as well as producer Diabi Tyler and rapper Doums, two friends of Nekfeu who were actively involved in his defense on social media) for "harassment through online public communication".

=== Lawsuits filed by two Miss France 2026 contestants (since 2025) ===
In December 2025, Aqababe had two lawsuits filed against him by two contestants at the Miss France 2026 contest, Miss Aquitaine 2025: Aïnhoa Lahitete and Miss Provence 2025: Julie Zitouni. This was due to Aqababe leaking a private video on Snapchat, after the contest, featuring the two contestants at the contest where Lahitete, Miss Aquitaine 2025, was upset that she didn't make the Top 12 semifinals in the contest and question what the Top 12 even was. Zitouni, Miss Provence 2025, was also seen in the video referring to the Top 12 as "just a bunch of whores". Zitouni would later state in both an apology posted to social media and in an interview with La Provence newspaper, that she made her comment as a joke to cheer Lahitete up after she was upset about not making the Top 12 semifinals. Aqababe would also accuse Zitouni of smoking marijuana during the pageant and thus, lose out on making the semifinals, which Zitouni herself denies and even stating that she even told the Miss France Company not to include in the Top 12 as she didn't want to be included. Lahitete and Zitouni have both since apologized for the comments.

Following the leaking of the videos, the two contestants would experience relentless online harassment on social media along with widespread condemnation for unsportsmanlike conduct towards their fellow contestants. The pageant winner of Miss France 2026, Hinaupoko Devèze who competed as Miss Tahiti 2025, would go on to denounce the online harassment towards the two contestants after the videos were leaked and had nothing else to say after the two contestants had posted apologies to both of their social media accounts. Miss France Company president, Frédéric Gilbert, would go to do the same on an appearance on the France 2 talk show What A Time! (Quelle époque !). Journalist Clément Garin would later go on to report that an anonymous source connected to the contest and its contestants for that year stated that the comments of the two girls were in response to two contestants being accused of fatphobia being included in the top 12. Because of the controversy, on 9 December 2025, the Miss Aquitaine Committee and the Miss Provence Committee released a joint statement where they announced that the two contestants in the controversy (Lahitete and Zitouni) were both dethroned due to their comments in the leaked video.

On 10 December 2025, it was reported that Aïnhoa Lahitete, the now dethroned Miss Aquitaine, filed a lawsuit against Aqababe and the individuals who were involved in leaking the video, citing invasion of privacy and non-consensual dissemination of private content. The following day (11 December 2025), it was reported that Julie Zitouni, the now dethroned Miss Provence, would also file a lawsuit against Aqababe, due to him falsely accusing her of losing out on the Top 12 because of her being caught smoking marijuana during the pageant, along with X, citing online harassment that she experienced from anonymous users.

== Personal life ==
In an interview with Sam Zirah, Aqababe revealed that he is gay and discussed academic difficulties related to his sexuality.

Aqababe married Adrien Zitouni on 12 September 2026.
