= Miss Champagne-Ardenne =

- Type: Beauty pageant
- Headquarters: Champagne-Ardenne, France
- Members: Miss France
- Official language: French
- Regional director: Maxime Schneider

Miss Champagne-Ardenne is a French beauty pageant which selects a representative for the Miss France national competition from the region of Champagne-Ardenne. Women representing the region under various different titles have competed at Miss France since 1964, although the Miss Champagne-Ardenne title was not used regularly until 1994.

The current Miss Champagne-Ardenne is Céline Leduc, who was crowned Miss Champagne-Ardenne 2026 on 27 September 2026. No Miss Champagne-Ardenne titleholders have gone on to win Miss France.

== Results summary ==
- 1st Runner-Up: Gisèle Aupetit (1964; Miss Champagne)
- 3rd Runner-Up: Safiatou Guinot (2017)
- 4th Runner-Up: Guilène Nancy (1976; Miss Champagne); Christine Grégoire (1984; Miss Champagne)
- Top 12/Top 15: Karine Lenne (1990); Cécile Brandao (2009); Déborah Trichet (2012); Louison Thévenin (2024); Ynès Lallemand (2025)

== Titleholders ==
Year	Name	Age (Note: Ages at the time of Miss France)	Height	Hometown	Miss France placement	Notes
2026	Céline Leduc	23	1.83 m (6 ft 0 in)	Tagnon	TBD	
2025	Ynès Lallemand	19	1.71 m (5 ft 7 1/2 in)	Reims	Top 12	
2024	Louison Thévenin	24	1.85 m (6 ft 1 in)	Sainte-Savine	Top 15	
2023	Noa Dutitre	22	1.70 m (5 ft 7 in)	Reims		Dutitre is the daughter of French football manager Jérôme Dutitre.
2022	Solène Scholer	20	1.80 m (5 ft 11 in)	Châlons-en-Champagne		
2021	Léna Massinger	20	1.70 m (5 ft 7 in)	Reims		
2020	Gwenegann Saillard	21	1.70 m (5 ft 7 in)	Sainte-Savine		
2019	Lucille Moine	18	1.73 m (5 ft 8 in)	Charleville-Mézières		
2018	Paméla Texier	22	1.71 m (5 ft 7 1/2 in)	Sillery		
2017	Safiatou Guinot	20	1.70 m (5 ft 7 in)	Reims	3rd Runner-Up	
2016	Charlotte Patat	19	1.82 m (5 ft 11 1/2 in)	Reims		
2015	Océane Pagenot	20	1.71 m (5 ft 7 1/2 in)	Reims		
2014	Julie Campolo	23			Did not compete	Campolo was dethroned after it emerged that she had competed in too many regional pageants prior to winning Miss Champagne-Ardenne, and she was replaced by Cervoni, her first runner-up.
2014	Melissa Cervoni	20	1.77 m (5 ft 9 1/2 in)	Vanault-les-Dames		Campolo was dethroned after it emerged that she had competed in too many regional pageants prior to winning Miss Champagne-Ardenne, and she was replaced by Cervoni, her first runner-up.
2013	Louise Bataille	18	1.78 m (5 ft 10 in)	Reims		
2012	Déborah Trichet	22	1.82 m (5 ft 11 1/2 in)	Rethel	Top 12	
2011	Sarah Huard	21	1.71 m (5 ft 7 1/2 in)	Reims		
2010	Kelly Renson	19	1.70 m (5 ft 7 in)	Vendeuvre-sur-Barse		
2009	Cécile Brandao	22	1.72 m (5 ft 7 1/2 in)	Bar-sur-Aube	Top 12	
2008	Émilie Collomb	19	1.72 m (5 ft 7 1/2 in)	Proverville		
2007	Déborah Lopez	19	1.77 m (5 ft 9 1/2 in)	Sedan		
2006	Ophélie Mouchène	24	1.74 m (5 ft 8 1/2 in)	Montcy-Notre-Dame		
2005	Cindy Perrin	23	1.75 m (5 ft 9 in)	Balan		
2004	Maryline Lambert	20	1.80 m (5 ft 11 in)		Did not compete	Lambert withdrew from Miss France three days prior to the final for undisclosed reasons, and was not replaced.
2003	Estelle Deheurle					
2002	Alexandra Royer	22		Saint-Dizier		
2001	Anne Sophie Valentin			Châlons-en-Champagne		
2000	Marion Destenay			Sedan		
1999	Candice Labbé	18	1.71 m (5 ft 7 1/2 in)	Reims		
1998	Cécile Guyot	20	1.80 m (5 ft 11 in)	Jasseines		
1997	Sophie Marty	20	1.76 m (5 ft 9 1/2 in)			
1996	Nathalie Frère					
1995	Cendrine Guyot	18		Jasseines		
1994	Valérie Krywalski	23				
1992	Emmanuelle Gonzales	18				
1990	Karine Lenne				Top 12	

=== Miss Ardennes ===
In the 1970s and 1980s, the department of Ardennes crowned its own representative for Miss France.

Year	Name	Age	Height	Hometown	Miss France placement	Notes
1985	Sylvie Boucton					
1980	Rose-Marie Charbeau					
1978	Christine Louis					
1977	Isabelle Gonzales					
1976	Brigitte Vaucher					
1970	Dany Martinet					

=== Miss Aube ===
In 1978, the department of Aube crowned its own representative for Miss France.

Year	Name	Age	Height	Hometown	Miss France placement	Notes
1978	Nathalie Rousseau					

=== Miss Champagne ===
In 1964, the 1970s, and the 1980s, the region crowned a representative under the title Miss Champagne. In 1970, the title was called Miss Brie-Champagne.

Year	Name	Age	Height	Hometown	Miss France placement	Notes
1984	Christine Grégoire				4th Runner-Up	
1983	Sabine Juy					
1982	Lydia Landry					
1981	Patricia Lisere					
1979	Sophia Mahiou					
1978	Dominique Corneille					
1977	Marina Sennepin					
1976	Guilène Nancy				4th Runner-Up	
1975	Ivana Bonato					
1972	Ghislaine Louette					
1971	Patricia André					
1970	Mercedes Castiblanque					
1964	Gisèle Aupetit				1st Runner-Up	

=== Miss Pays d'Othe ===
In 1993, the regions of Champagne-Ardenne and Burgundy crowned a shared representative under the title Miss Pays d'Othe.

Year	Name	Age	Height	Hometown	Miss France placement	Notes
1993	Clarisse Garçonnat					
