= Miss Auvergne =

French beauty pageant

- Type: Beauty pageant
- Headquarters: Auvergne, France
- Members: Miss France
- Official language: French
- Regional director: Mélanie Billard

Miss Auvergne is a French beauty pageant which selects a representative for the Miss France national competition from the region of Auvergne. The first Miss Auvergne was crowned in 1968, although the pageant was not held regularly until 1990.

The current Miss Auvergne is Lina Berthelier, who was crowned Miss Auvergne 2026 on 18 September 2026. No Miss Auvergne titleholders have gone on to win Miss France.

== Results summary ==
- 2nd Runner-Up: Maryline Brun (1999; Miss Pays du Velay); Clémence Oleksy (2010)
- 3rd Runner-Up: Michèle Cointet (1974)
- 4th Runner-Up: Alissia Ladevèze (2022)
- 5th Runner-Up: Camille Blond (2013)
- 6th Runner-Up: Alice De Lima Guimaraes (2025)
- Top 12/Top 15: Régine Bac (1990); Fabienne Chol (1993; Miss Pays du Velay); Catherine Sarret (1996); Fabienne Malisano (1997); Pauline Abeillon (2003; Miss Pays du Velay); Emmanuelle Lemery (2007)

== Titleholders ==
Year	Name	Age (Note: Ages at the time of Miss France)	Height	Hometown	Miss France placement	Notes
2026	Lina Berthelier	24	1.73 m (5 ft 8 in)	Commentry	TBD	
2025	Alice De Lima Guimaraes	20	1.72 m (5 ft 7 1/2 in)	Vichy	Top 12 (6th Runner-Up)	
2024	Romane Agostinho	28	1.75 m (5 ft 9 in)	Beaumont		
2023	Oriane Mallet	22	1.83 m (6 ft 0 in)	Vichy		
2022	Alissia Ladevèze	21	1.84 m (6 ft 1/2 in)	Vichy	4th Runner-Up	
2021	Anaïs Werestchack	24	1.77 m (5 ft 9 1/2 in)	Clermont-Ferrand		
2020	Géromine Prique	21	1.71 m (5 ft 7 1/2 in)	Clermont-Ferrand		
2019	Meïssa Ameur	21	1.86 m (6 ft 1 in)	Clermont-Ferrand		
2018	Romane Eichstadt	19	1.81 m (5 ft 11 1/2 in)	Vichy		
2017	Marie-Anne Halbwachs	19	1.81 m (5 ft 11 1/2 in)	Riom		
2016	Océane Faure	20	1.71 m (5 ft 7 1/2 in)	Yzeure		
2015	Pauline Bazoge	18	1.71 m (5 ft 7 1/2 in)	La Chapelaude		
2014	Morgane Laporte	20	1.76 m (5 ft 9 1/2 in)	Terjat		
2013	Camille Blond	18	1.71 m (5 ft 7 1/2 in)	Avermes	Top 12 (5th Runner-Up)	
2012	Sanne Spangenberg	19	1.80 m (5 ft 11 in)	Autry-Issards		
2011	Célia Goninet	19	1.75 m (5 ft 9 in)	Clermont-Ferrand		
2010	Clémence Oleksy	19	1.76 m (5 ft 9 1/2 in)	Vichy	2nd Runner-Up	
2009	Mégane Potier	19	1.75 m (5 ft 9 in)	Cusset		
2008	Mélanie Billard	22	1.73 m (5 ft 8 in)	Saint-Germain-des-Fossés		
2007	Emmanuelle Lemery	19	1.81 m (5 ft 11 1/2 in)	Clermont-Ferrand	Top 12	
2006	Stéphanie Riou	22	1.73 m (5 ft 8 in)	Lempdes		
2005	Élisa Ortiz de Pinedo	23	1.75 m (5 ft 9 in)	Mauriac		
2004	Élodie Veyssière	20	1.75 m (5 ft 9 in)			
2003	Sonia Souid	18	1.81 m (5 ft 11 1/2 in)	Clermont-Ferrand		
2002	Clémence Daturi	18		Riom		
2001	Hélène Linard			Cantal		
2000	Sophie Gonin			Trévol		
1999	Laëtitia Lautrette	22	1.76 m (5 ft 9 1/2 in)	Dompierre-sur-Besbre		
1998	Mathilde Dupré	20	1.83 m (6 ft 0 in)	Cusset		
1997	Fabienne Malisano	21	1.76 m (5 ft 9 1/2 in)	Montluçon	Top 12	
1996	Catherine Sarret			Jussac	Top 12	
1995	Fanny Voisin					
1994	Carole Manin					
1993	Delphine Montoy					
1992	Cécile Ruer					
1991	Carine Claverolles					
1990	Régine Bac			Quézac	Top 12	
1978	Catherine Chandezon					
1974	Michèle Cointet	24	1.74 m (5 ft 8 1/2 in)		3rd Runner-Up	
1968	Paule Marche	19	1.69 m (5 ft 6 1/2 in)		Did not compete	Marche did not compete at Miss France after her parents disapproved.

=== Miss Pays du Velay ===
From 1993 to 2004, the department of Haute-Loire competed separately as Miss Pays du Velay.

Year	Name	Age	Height	Hometown	Miss France placement	Notes
2004	Coralie Duchet	22	1.72 m (5 ft 7 1/2 in)	Cébazat		
2003	Pauline Abeillon				Top 12	
2002	Laetitia Meteigner			Sainte-Florine		
2001	Marine Gazanion					
2000	Sabrina Crespe			Le Puy-en-Velay		
1999	Maryline Brun	20	1.78 m (5 ft 10 in)	Arsac-en-Velay	2nd Runner-Up	
1998	Sabine Laval	19	1.77 m (5 ft 9 1/2 in)			
1997	Lydie Valentin	19	1.74 m (5 ft 8 1/2 in)	Yssingeaux		
1996	Amélie Fournel					
1995	Véronique Joy					
1994	Christelle Brunet-Jailly					
1993	Fabienne Chol				Top 12	
