= Miss France 2025 =

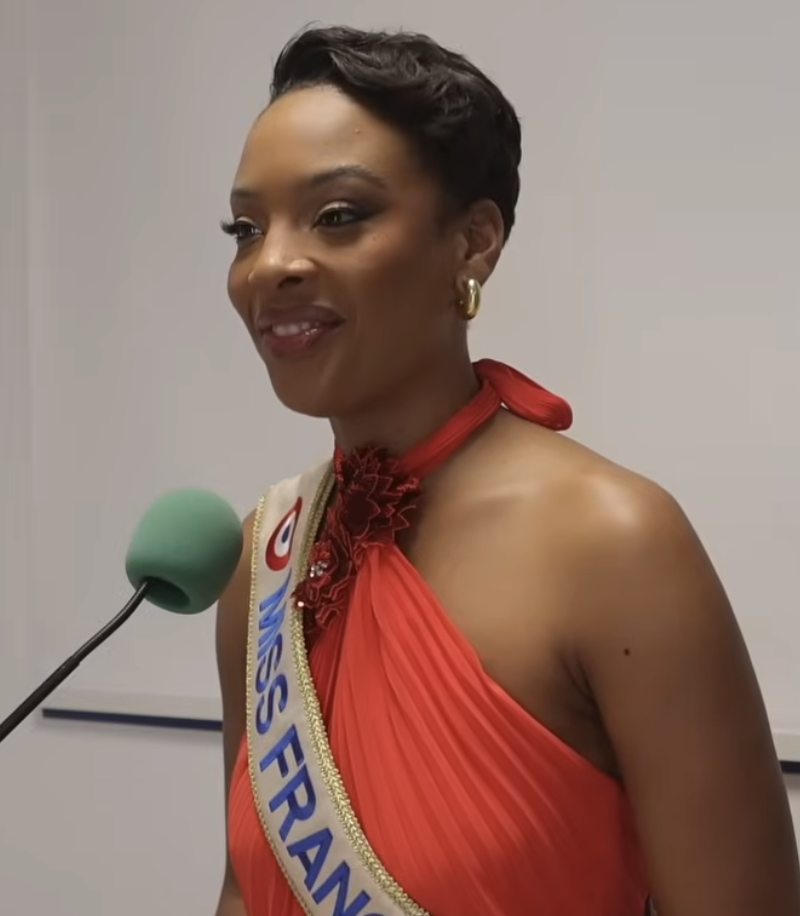
- Miss France 2025, Angélique Angarni-Filopon
- Date: 14 December 2024
- Presenters: Jean-Pierre Foucault; Cindy Fabre
- Venue: Futuroscope Arena, Chasseneuil-du-Poitou and Jaunay-Clan, Nouvelle-Aquitaine
- Broadcaster: TF1; TF1+
- Entrants: 30
- Placements: 15
- Withdrawals: New Caledonia
- Returns: Saint Martin and Saint Barthélemy
- Winner: Angélique Angarni-Filopon; Martinique

Miss France 2025 was the 95th edition of the Miss France pageant, held at the Futuroscope Arena in Vienne, Nouvelle-Aquitaine, France, on 14 December 2024.

Eve Gilles of Nord-Pas-de-Calais crowned Angélique Angarni-Filopon of Martinique as her successor at the end of the event.

The 2025 edition marked the first edition under the leadership of Frédéric Gilbert, following the resignation of former president Alexia Laroche-Joubert after the conclusion of Miss France 2024, and the final edition featuring Cindy Fabre, following her departure from the Miss France Organization in January 2025.

== Background ==
=== Location ===
In December 2023, it was reported that Jean Bodart, the mayor of Dunkirk, would apply for the city to host the 2025 edition of Miss France. Reigning titleholder Eve Gilles was born in Dunkirk, and it is customary for the home region of the reigning Miss France to host the subsequent edition of the competition.

On 10 September 2024, the Miss France Committee announced that the pageant would be held on 14 December 2024 at the Futuroscope Arena, located within the communes of Chasseneuil-du-Poitou and Jaunay-Clan in the Vienne department of Poitou-Charentes, near the city of Poitiers. This was the third time that the Futuroscope hosted the pageant, following Miss France 2007 and Miss France 1997.

On 16 October, it was announced that the annual overseas trip for the delegates would be to Côte d'Ivoire. The delegates will visit Côte d'Ivoire for a variety of events, before returning to France to begin rehearsals.

=== Selection of contestants ===
The 2025 contestants were selected through regional pageants, held between June and October 2024.

The 2025 edition will see the return of Saint Martin and Saint Barthélemy, which competes on a biennial basis, and the withdrawal of New Caledonia. While New Caledonia had initially intended to compete, they were unable to organize a regional pageant due to the ongoing political unrest.

== Results ==
=== Placements ===
Placement	Contestant
Miss France 2025	Martinique – Angélique Angarni-Filopon
1st Runner-Up	Nord-Pas-de-Calais – Sabah Aïb
2nd Runner-Up	Corsica – Stella Vangioni
3rd Runner-Up	Guadeloupe – Moïra André
4th Runner-Up	Côte d'Azur – Lilou Émeline-Artuso
Top 15 (Note: The Top 15 semifinalists are listed in the order that they placed according to the official results.)	Burgundy – Clara Diry (5th Runner-Up); Aquitaine – Laura Marque (6th Runner-Up); Picardy – Marina Przadka; Lorraine – Assia Roosz-Tomenti; Normandy – Lucile Lecellier; Alsace – Isabella Hebert; Midi-Pyrénées – Olivia Sirena; Tahiti – Temanava Domingo; Champagne-Ardenne – Louison Thévenin; Rhône-Alpes – Alexcia Couly

=== Special awards ===
Prize	Contestant
General Culture Award	Picardy – Marina Przadka (15.5/20) (Note: The General Culture Award is given to the contestant with the highest score on the general culture exam, which tests contestants' grasp of topics such as history, politics, current events, and pop culture. Miss Picardy received the highest score of 15.5 and was thus given the award.)
Best Regional Costume	Île-de-France – Julie Dupont (Note: The costume was created by Manuarii Teauroa.)
Camaraderie Award	Île-de-France – Julie Dupont
Catwalk Award	Picardy – Marina Przadka
Eloquence Award	Champagne-Ardenne – Louison Thévenin
Miss Academy Award	Poitou-Charentes – Charlie Benard

=== Scoring ===
==== Preliminaries ====
A jury composed of partners (internal and external) of the Miss France Committee selected fifteen delegates during an interview that took place on 11 December to advance to the semifinals.

==== Top 15 ====
In the top fifteen, a 50/50 split vote between the official jury and voting public selected five delegates to advance to the top five. Each delegate was awarded an overall score of 1 to 15 from the jury and public, and the five delegates with the highest combined scores advanced to the top five. The delegates with the sixth and seventh highest combined scores were afterwards designated as the fifth and sixth runners-up, respectively, despite not advancing in the competition. In the case of a tie, the jury vote prevailed.

Contestant	Public	Jury	Total
Martinique	14	14	28
Guadeloupe	15	13	28
Corsica	11	15	26
Nord-Pas-de-Calais	13	13	26
Côte d'Azur	10	11	21
Burgundy	8	11	19
Aquitaine	12	7	19
Picardy	7	11	18
Lorraine	4	11	15
Normandy	9	4	13
Alsace	6	4	10
Midi-Pyrénées	5	4	9
(French Polynesia) Tahiti	2	6	8
Champagne-Ardenne	1	6	7
Rhône-Alpes	3	4	7

==== Top five ====
In the top five, a 50/50 split vote between the official jury and voting public determined which contestant was declared Miss France. Each contestant was ranked from first to fifth by the jury and public, and the two scores were combined to create a total score. In the case of a tie, the public vote prevailed.

#	Candidate	Public	Jury	Total
1	Martinique	4	5	9
2	Nord-Pas-de-Calais	5	3	8
3	Corsica	2	4	6
4	Guadeloupe	3	2	5
5	Côte d'Azur	1	1	2

== Pageant ==
=== Format ===
On 15 November, it was announced in a press conference that the theme for this edition of the competition would be le grand bal des Miss (English: The Misses' grand ball), with competition rounds being inspired by various types of dance.

The competition opened with an introduction performance, featuring a guest appearance from Eve Gilles and several other Miss France titleholders. The 30 contestants were then separated into three groups, each consisting of ten contestants, with each group taking part in an initial presentation round. The three presentation rounds were themed after twist, country-western, and prom, respectively. Afterwards, the 30 contestants presented their regional costumes, created by local designers from their home regions, in a round inspired by firefighters' ball. The 30 contestants subsequently participated in the one-piece swimsuit round, inspired by 1990s music.

After that, the Top 15 were announced. The Top 15 then competed in an evening gown round inspired by tango and a second swimsuit round inspired by salsa. Afterwards, the Top 5 were announced and presented their ball gowns in a round inspired by classical ballet. After the final question round, the final results were revealed.

=== Judges ===
The judges were announced on 28 November 2024.

- Sylvie Vartan (President of the Jury) – singer and actress
- Khatia Buniatishvili – pianist
- Cristina Córdula – television presenter and fashion consultant
- Flora Coquerel – Miss France 2014 from Centre-Val de Loire
- Fauve Hautot – dancer and choreographer
- Nawell Madani – comedian
- Marie-José Pérec – track and field sprinter

== Contestants ==
All 30 contestants have been selected:

Region	Contestant	Age (Note: Ages at the time of the pageant)	Height	Hometown	Placement	Notes
Alsace	Isabella Hebert	20	1.71 m (5 ft 7 1/2 in)	Mundolsheim	Top 15	
Aquitaine	Laura Marque	25	1.75 m (5 ft 9 in)	Arcachon	Top 15	
Auvergne	Romane Agostinho	28	1.75 m (5 ft 9 in)	Beaumont		
Brittany	Marie Castel	20	1.78 m (5 ft 10 in)	Pleyber-Christ		
Burgundy	Clara Diry	21	1.72 m (5 ft 7 1/2 in)	Saint-Agnan	Top 15	Diry is the sister of Sophie Diry, Miss Burgundy 2019.
Centre-Val de Loire	Tiffanny Haie	18	1.76 m (5 ft 9 1/2 in)	Rouvres		
Champagne-Ardenne	Louison Thévenin	24	1.85 m (6 ft 1 in)	Sainte-Savine	Top 15	
Corsica	Stella Vangioni	27	1.71 m (5 ft 7 1/2 in)	Bastia	2nd Runner-Up	
Côte d'Azur	Lilou Émeline-Artuso	22	1.78 m (5 ft 10 in)	Antibes	4th Runner-Up	
Franche-Comté	Manon Le Maou	28	1.74 m (5 ft 8 1/2 in)	Villers-Saint-Martin		
French Guiana	Jade Fansonna	22	1.74 m (5 ft 8 1/2 in)	Matoury		
Guadeloupe	Moïra André	28	1.71 m (5 ft 7 1/2 in)	Terre-de-Bas	3rd Runner-Up	
Île-de-France	Julie Dupont	26	1.76 m (5 ft 9 1/2 in)	Puteaux		
Languedoc	Jade Benazech	19	1.82 m (5 ft 11 1/2 in)	Sallèles-d'Aude		
Limousin	Emma Grégoire	23	1.78 m (5 ft 10 in)	Bort-les-Orgues		
Lorraine	Assia Roosz-Tomenti	25	1.86 m (6 ft 1 in)	Villerupt	Top 15	
Martinique	Angélique Angarni-Filopon	34	1.83 m (6 ft 0 in)	Fort-de-France	Miss France 2025	
Mayotte	Zaya Toumbou	20	1.73 m (5 ft 8 in)	Acoua		
Midi-Pyrénées	Olivia Sirena	23	1.78 m (5 ft 10 in)	Balma	Top 15	
Nord-Pas-de-Calais	Sabah Aïb	18	1.73 m (5 ft 8 in)	Valenciennes	1st Runner-Up	
Normandy	Lucile Lecellier	27	1.74 m (5 ft 8 1/2 in)	Sainte-Cécile	Top 15	
Pays de la Loire	Mélissa Atta Bessiom	26	1.81 m (5 ft 11 1/2 in)	Angers		
Picardy	Marina Przadka	26	1.70 m (5 ft 7 in)	Villers-Saint-Paul	Top 15	
Poitou-Charentes	Charlie Bénard	27	1.70 m (5 ft 7 in)	La Couronne		
Provence	Mégane Bertaud	24	1.73 m (5 ft 8 in)	Tourrettes		
Réunion	Marine Futol	18	1.80 m (5 ft 11 in)	Saint-Leu		
Rhône-Alpes	Alexcia Couly	22	1.72 m (5 ft 7 1/2 in)	Villeurbanne	Top 15	
Roussillon	Cassiopée Rimbaud	21	1.71 m (5 ft 7 1/2 in)	Laroque-des-Albères		
Saint Martin and Saint Barthélemy	Sasha Bique	20	1.70 m (5 ft 7 in)	Marigot		
Tahiti	Temanava Domingo	23	1.81 m (5 ft 11 1/2 in)	Punaauia	Top 15	
