= Miss New Caledonia =

French beauty pageant

- Type: Beauty pageant
- Headquarters: New Caledonia, France
- Members: Miss France
- Official language: French
- Regional director: Stella Le Van Hao
- Website: missnouvellecaledonie.com

Miss New Caledonia (French: Miss Nouvelle-Calédonie) is a French beauty pageant which selects a representative for the Miss France national competition from the sui generis overseas collectivity of New Caledonia. The first Miss New Caledonia was crowned in 1952, although the pageant was not held regularly until 1980. Until 2007, the competition was known as Miss Caledonia (French: Miss Calédonie).

The current Miss New Caledonia is Lana Prost, who was crowned Miss New Caledonia 2026 on 25 July 2026. One woman from New Caledonia has been crowned Miss France:

- Pascale Taurua, who was crowned Miss France 1978, although she later resigned the title

== Results summary ==
- Miss France: Pascale Taurua (1977)
- 1st Runner-Up: Vahinerii Requillart (2007); Juliette Collet (2025)
- 2nd Runner-Up: Nadine Guillerme (1980)
- 3rd Runner-Up: Gisèle Maui (1985)
- 6th Runner-Up: Emmanuelle Darman (2005); Mondy Laigle (2014)

== Titleholders ==
Year	Name	Age (Note: Ages at the time of Miss France)	Height	Hometown	Miss France placement	Notes
2026	Lana Prost	18	1.75 m (5 ft 9 in)	Le Mont-Dore	TBD	
2025	Juliette Collet	23	1.70 m (5 ft 7 in)	Touho	1st Runner-Up	
2023	Mathilda Lelong	24	1.75 m (5 ft 9 in)	Nouméa	Did not compete	Grousset was originally the second runner-up, while Lelong was crowned the winner. Three days following the Miss New Caledonia pageant, the media reported that a counting error had occurred while tabulating the results, and that Grousset was the actual winner while Lelong was the third runner-up. Two days later, Grousset became the new Miss New Caledonia 2023, while Lelong later resigned her title as third runner-up. Grousset is the sister of French swimmer Maxime Grousset. Lelong is the daughter of Carole Roudeillac, Miss Caledonia 1996.
2023	Emma Grousset	21	1.80 m (5 ft 11 in)	Nouméa		
2022	Océane Le Goff	26	1.72 m (5 ft 7 1/2 in)	Nouméa		
2021	Emmy Chenin	18	1.76 m (5 ft 9 1/2 in)	La Foa		
2020	Louisa Salvan	19	1.74 m (5 ft 8 1/2 in)	Le Mont-Dore		
2019	Anaïs Toven	18	1.70 m (5 ft 7 in)	Nouméa		
2018	Amandine Chabrier	19	1.71 m (5 ft 7 1/2 in)	Le Mont-Dore		
2017	Lévina Napoléon	19	1.70 m (5 ft 7 in)	Pouembout		
2016	Andréa Lux	18	1.75 m (5 ft 9 in)	Bourail		
2015	Gyna Moereo	18	1.76 m (5 ft 9 1/2 in)	Houaïlou		
2014	Mondy Laigle	19	1.71 m (5 ft 7 1/2 in)	Boulouparis	Top 12 (6th Runner-Up)	
2013	Agnès Latchimy	22	1.77 m (5 ft 9 1/2 in)	Nouméa		
2012	Sandra Bergès	18	1.73 m (5 ft 8 in)	Nouméa		
2011	Tokahi Mathieu	23	1.71 m (5 ft 7 1/2 in)		Did not compete	Mathieu was initially crowned the winner, but resigned for personal reasons. She was replaced by Bichot, her first runner-up, as the titleholder.
2011	Océane Bichot	20	1.78 m (5 ft 10 in)	Nouméa		Mathieu was initially crowned the winner, but resigned for personal reasons. She was replaced by Bichot, her first runner-up, as the titleholder.
2010	Ornella Zinni	21	1.72 m (5 ft 7 1/2 in)	Bourail		
2008	Aurelia Morell	20	1.75 m (5 ft 9 in)	Nouméa		
2007	Vahinerii Requillart	19	1.74 m (5 ft 8 1/2 in)	Nouméa	1st Runner-Up	

=== Miss Caledonia ===
Until 2007, the pageant was known by the name Miss Caledonia (French: Miss Calédonie).

Year	Name	Age	Height	Hometown	Miss France placement	Notes
2006	Nathanaëlle Techer				Did not compete	Techer was disqualified from competing at Miss France by the Miss France Committee, and was replaced by her first runner-up, Lambert-Gimey, as Miss Caledonia.
2006	Alexandra Lambert-Gimey	23	1.72 m (5 ft 7 1/2 in)	Nouméa		Techer was disqualified from competing at Miss France by the Miss France Committee, and was replaced by her first runner-up, Lambert-Gimey, as Miss Caledonia.
2005	Emmanuelle Darman	18	1.72 m (5 ft 7 1/2 in)	Nouméa	Top 12 (6th Runner-Up)	
2004	Audrey Audineau	20	1.85 m (6 ft 1 in)	Nouméa		
2003	Mélody Gaspard			Nouméa		
2002	Cyrielle Pindon			Voh		
2001	Stéphanie Chalumeau					
2000	Virginie Lamontagne					
1999	Audrey Brahim					
1997	Cindy Baronnet	18	1.73 m (5 ft 8 in)			
1996	Carole Roudeillac					Roudeillac is the mother of Mathilda Lelong, the initially crowned Miss New Caledonia 2023.
1992	Sylvie Marcuzzo				Did not compete	
1991	Valérie-Anne Delrieu				Did not compete	
1990	Maguy Viera Da Silva					
1988	Caroll Blanc					
1987	Helyette Voisin					
1986	Amanda Aissa Benhamer					
1985	Gisèle Maui				3rd Runner-Up	
1984	Nathalie Jones					
1983	Georgia Roussel					
1982	Laurence Varney	16				
1981	Maryse Salaun					
1980	Nadine Guillerme				2nd Runner-Up	
1977	Pascale Taurua	17			Miss France 1978	Taurua resigned several months after winning Miss France, as she wished to return to New Caledonia instead of remain in Paris, where the titleholder resides to fulfill her duties.
1954	Juanita Châtelain	17				
1952	Danièle Gastaldi					
