= Miss Côte d'Azur =

Beauty pageant

- Type: Beauty pageant
- Headquarters: Provence-Alpes-Côte d'Azur, France
- Members: Miss France
- Official language: French
- Regional director: Lydia Podossenoff
- Website: www.missprovencealpescotedazur.fr

Miss Côte d'Azur is a French beauty pageant which selects a representative for the Miss France national competition from the department of Alpes-Maritimes and portions of Var in the region of Provence-Alpes-Côte d'Azur (PACA). The other regional pageant within PACA is Miss Provence, which selects a representative from the other departments of PACA and the remaining portions of Var. The first Miss Côte d'Azur was crowned in 1932, although the competition was not organized regularly until 1962.

The current Miss Côte d'Azur is May Haoues, who was crowned Miss Côte d'Azur 2026 on 26 July 2026. Six women from the Côte d'Azur have been crowned Miss France:

- Lyne de Souza, who was crowned Miss France 1933
- Yvonne Viseux, who was crowned Miss France 1947
- Nicole Drouin, who was crowned Miss France 1951, competing as Miss Saint-Tropez
- Irène Tunc, who was crowned Miss France 1954
- Michèle Boulé, who was crowned Miss France 1966, competing as Miss Cannes
- Sabrina Belleval, who was crowned Miss France 1982

== Results summary ==
- Miss France: Lyne de Souza (1932); Yvonne Viseux (1946); Nicole Drouin (1950; Miss Saint-Tropez); Irène Tunc (1953); Michèle Boulé (1965; Miss Cannes); Sabrina Belleval (1981)
- 1st runner-up: Solange Dessoy (1952; Miss Lavandou); Monique Lambert (1954)
- 2nd runner-up: Patricia Lelong (1975); Patricia Sismondini (1979); Louise Prieto (2001); Charlotte Pirroni (2014); Lara Gautier (2020)
- 3rd runner-up: Mireille Cayrac (1952; Miss Toulon); Elisabeth Gandolfi (1976); Aurianne Sinacola (2013)
- 4th runner-up: Corinne Luthringer (1988); Azemina Hot (2007); Charlotte Murray (2011); Manelle Souahlia (2019); Lilou-Émeline Artuso (2024)
- 5th runner-up: Flavy Barla (2022)
- Top 12/top 15: Alice Troietto (1985); Nathalie Bianchi (1987); Marie Torrente (1991); Valérie Fredon (1992); Valérie Barrière (1993); Sabine Winczewski (1995); Élodie Robert (2006); Anaïs Governatori (2009); Marine Laugier (2010); Charlotte Mint (2012); Leanna Ferrero (2015); Caroline Perengo (2018); Valeria Pavelin (2021); Karla Bchir (2023); Luna Maiolino (2025)

== Gallery ==
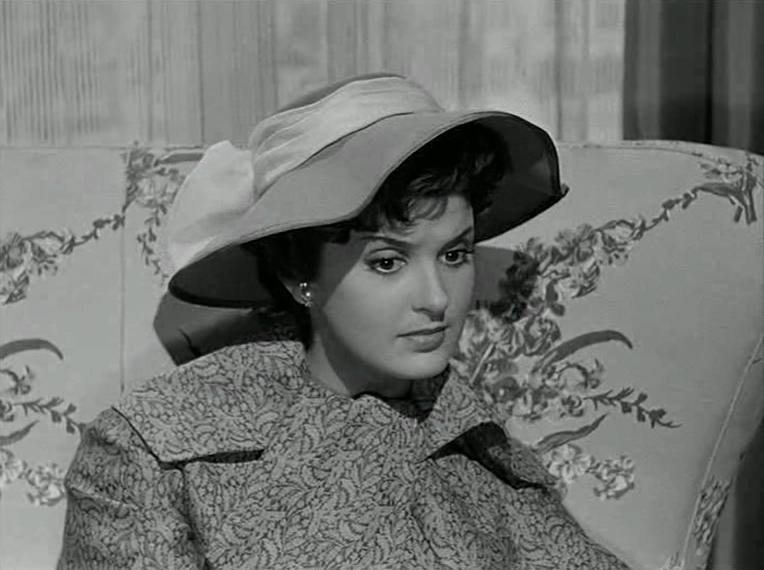
Miss Côte d'Azur 1953 and Miss France 1954
Irène Tunc

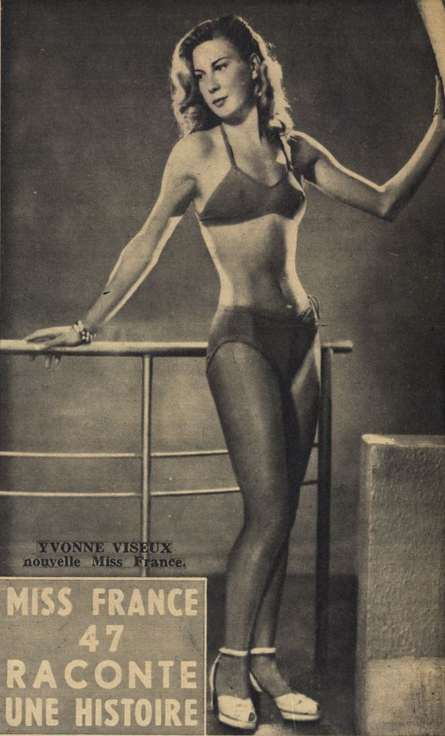
Miss Côte d'Azur 1946 and Miss France 1947
Yvonne Viseux

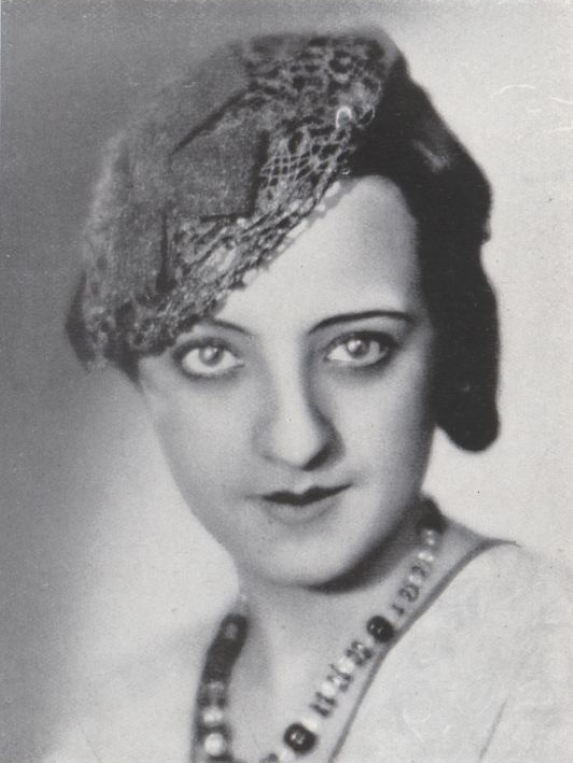
Miss Côte d'Azur 1932 and Miss France 1933
Lyne de Souza

== Titleholders ==
Year	Name	Age (Note: Ages at the time of Miss France)	Height	Hometown	Miss France placement	Notes
2026	May Haoues	19	1.74 m (5 ft 8 1/2 in)	Cagnes-sur-Mer	TBD	
2025	Luna Maiolino	19	1.75 m (5 ft 9 in)	Antibes	Top 12	
2024	Lilou Émeline-Artuso	22	1.78 m (5 ft 10 in)	Antibes	4th Runner-Up	
2023	Karla Bchir	19	1.75 m (5 ft 9 in)	Cannes	Top 15	
2022	Flavy Barla	19	1.72 m (5 ft 7 1/2 in)	Nice	Top 15 (5th Runner-Up)	
2021	Valeria Pavelin	24	1.85 m (6 ft 1 in)	Nice	Top 15	Pavelin is the sister of Maria Pavelin, Miss Côte d'Azur 2016.
2020	Lara Gautier	22	1.74 m (5 ft 8 1/2 in)	Contes	2nd Runner-Up	
2019	Manelle Souahlia	19	1.71 m (5 ft 7 1/2 in)	Nice	4th Runner-Up	
2018	Caroline Perengo	22	1.71 m (5 ft 7 1/2 in)	Saint-Tropez	Top 12	
2017	Julia Sidi Atman	21	1.79 m (5 ft 10 1/2 in)	Cannes		
2016	Maria Pavelin	21	1.78 m (5 ft 10 in)	Nice	Did not compete	Pavelin resigned three months after her crowning to prioritize her studies, and was replaced by Scotte, her first runner-up. Pavelin is the sister of Valeria Pavelin, Miss Côte d'Azur 2021.
2016	Jade Scotte	23	1.72 m (5 ft 7 1/2 in)	Castellar		Pavelin resigned three months after her crowning to prioritize her studies, and was replaced by Scotte, her first runner-up. Pavelin is the sister of Valeria Pavelin, Miss Côte d'Azur 2021.
2015	Leanna Ferrero	20	1.72 m (5 ft 7 1/2 in)	Cannes	Top 12	
2014	Charlotte Pirroni	20	1.70 m (5 ft 7 in)	Roquebrune-Cap-Martin	2nd Runner-Up	Competed at Miss International 2015
2013	Aurianne Sinacola	19	1.75 m (5 ft 9 in)	Vallauris	3rd Runner-Up	Competed at Miss International 2014
2012	Charlotte Mint	19	1.71 m (5 ft 7 1/2 in)	Beausoleil	Top 12	
2011	Charlotte Murray	23	1.79 m (5 ft 10 1/2 in)	Biot	4th Runner-Up	
2010	Marine Laugier	22	1.77 m (5 ft 9 1/2 in)	Biot	Top 12	
2009	Anaïs Governatori	20	1.72 m (5 ft 7 1/2 in)	Nice	Top 12	
2008	Audrey Sans	20	1.75 m (5 ft 9 in)	Mougins		
2007	Azemina Hot	23	1.80 m (5 ft 11 in)	Nice	4th Runner-Up	
2006	Élodie Robert	22	1.73 m (5 ft 8 in)	Roquebrune-Cap-Martin	Top 12	
2005	Marjorie Delmont	20	1.79 m (5 ft 10 1/2 in)	Mandelieu-la-Napoule		
2004	Andréa Salvatore	18	1.72 m (5 ft 7 1/2 in)			
2003	Anaïs Moretti					
2002	Sandra Marmand					
2001	Louise Prieto			Roquebrune-Cap-Martin	2nd Runner-Up	
2000	Claire Parent			La Colle-sur-Loup		
1999	Olivia Elhoussine			La Colle-sur-Loup		
1998	Gaëlle Robert					
1997	Johanne Garcia	21	1.72 m (5 ft 7 1/2 in)			
1995	Sabine Winczewski			Nice	Top 12	
1994	Magali Farrugia					
1993	Valérie Barrière				Top 12	
1992	Valérie Fredon			La Crau	Top 12	
1991	Marie Torrente				Top 12	
1990	Sidonie Sourbé					
1989	Christelle Arsiel					
1988	Corinne Luthringer			Saint-Raphaël	4th Runner-Up	
1987	Nathalie Bianchi				Top 12	Bianchi was later crowned Miss Île-de-France 1988 as well.
1986	Florence Mourier					
1985	Alice Troietto				Top 12	
1983	Stéphanie Guérin					
1981	Sabrina Belleval	16	1.66 m (5 ft 5 1/2 in)	Nice	Miss France 1982	
1979	Patricia Sismondini			Saint-Raphaël	2nd Runner-Up	
1978	Béatrice Burié					Burié was crowned Miss Côte d'Azur two years in a row.
1977	Béatrice Burié					Burié was crowned Miss Côte d'Azur two years in a row.
1976	Elisabeth Gandolfi				3rd Runner-Up	
1975	Patricia Lelong				2nd Runner-Up	
1970	Elisabeth Durand					
1969	Helena Colonna	24				
1967	Marie-Claude Douat			Saint-Raphaël		Douat was crowned Miss Saint-Raphaël.
1965	Michèle Boulé	17		Cannes	Miss France 1966	Top 15 at Miss World 1966 Boulé was crowned Miss Cannes.
1964	Danielle Rivas					
1962	Nicole Cherrier					
1955	Maryse Fabre					
1954	Monique Lambert			Antibes	1st Runner-Up	
1953	Irène Tunc	19		Nice	Miss France 1954	
1952	Nicky le Priol					In 1952, three women were crowned to represent the region under different titles. Le Priol was crowned Miss Côte des Maures, Dessoy was crowned Miss Lavandou, and Cayrac was crowned Miss Toulon.
1952	Solange Dessoy			Le Lavandou	1st Runner-Up	In 1952, three women were crowned to represent the region under different titles. Le Priol was crowned Miss Côte des Maures, Dessoy was crowned Miss Lavandou, and Cayrac was crowned Miss Toulon.
1952	Mireille Cayrac			Toulon	3rd Runner-Up	In 1952, three women were crowned to represent the region under different titles. Le Priol was crowned Miss Côte des Maures, Dessoy was crowned Miss Lavandou, and Cayrac was crowned Miss Toulon.
1950	Nicole Drouin			Saint-Tropez	Miss France 1951	Drouin was crowned Miss Saint-Tropez.
1946	Yvonne Viseux				Miss France 1947	
1932	Lyne de Souza			Mouans-Sartoux	Miss France 1933	
