= Hinaupoko Devèze =

French beauty pageant titleholder

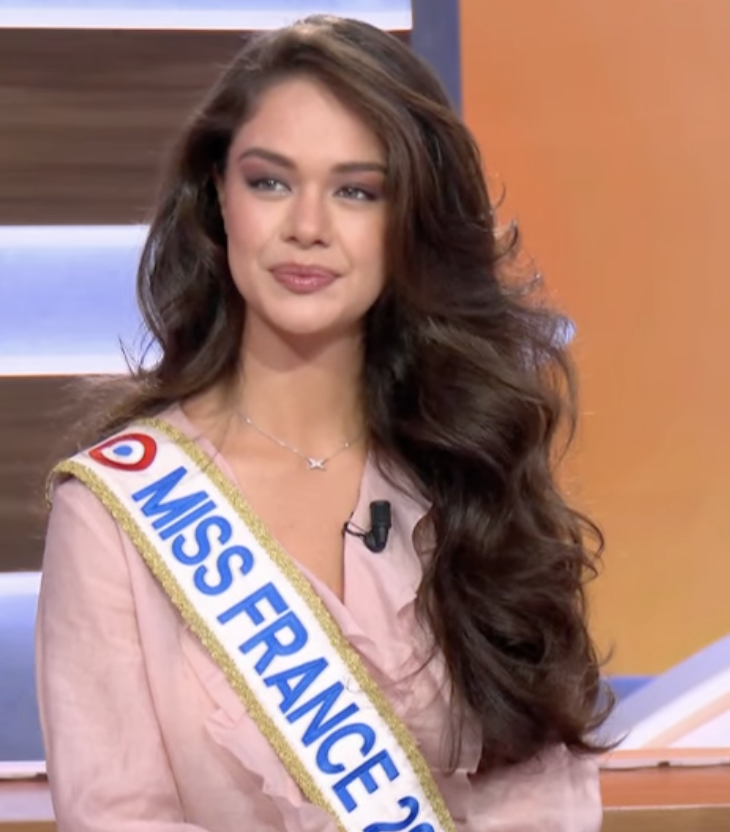
- Devèze in 2026
- Born: Céline Hinaupoko Heirani Devèze; 17 March 2002 (age 24); Papeete, French Polynesia
- Other name: Céline Devèze
- Height: 1.82 m (5 ft 11 1/2 in)
- Beauty pageant titleholder
- Title: Miss Tahiti 2025; Miss France 2026
- Major competitions: Miss France 2026; (Winner)

Céline Hinaupoko Heirani "Hina" Devèze (French pronunciation: [hinɑ.upoko dəvɛz] HEE-nah-OO-poh-koh DEH-vez; born 17 March 2002) is a French beauty pageant titleholder who won Miss France 2026. She had previously won Miss Tahiti 2025 and is the sixth representative from French Polynesia to win Miss France.

== Early life and education ==
Devèze was born on 17 March 2002 in Papeete, on the island of Tahiti, to parents Olivier Devèze and Léa Hatuuku, and was raised as the youngest child in a blended family with five half-brothers and two half-sisters. Her father is French and works as a psychiatrist, while her mother is from Ua Pou in the Marquesas Islands and works as a nursing assistant at a psychiatric hospital. Through her father, Devèze is a descendant of René of Anjou and was cited as the first Miss France winner with royal blood following her victory. Devèze's name Hinaupoko means "great goddess" in the Marquesan language, but she was given the first name Céline instead by her parents as her father was unable to pronounce Hinaupoko correctly.

In 2006, the family relocated to New Caledonia for two years before moving to the Gard department in metropolitan France, where her father came from. Upon their arrival in metropolitan France, the family first lived in Saint-Hippolyte-du-Fort for one year and later settled in Pompignan, although Devèze traveled frequently to Tahiti and the Marquesas Islands throughout her upbringing. While living in metropolitan France, Devèze worked as a model using the name Céline Devèze, and appeared in the music video for the song "Doudou" by French rappers Koba LaD and Naps in 2021.

Devèze was educated in the Languedoc-Roussillon region, spending her primary education and collège in the Gard department, and later attending lycée at Lycée privé Notre-Dame de la Merci, a private boarding school in Montpellier. After earning a baccalauréat scientifique, Devèze initially studied law at university in Montpellier and planned to become a judge. She later decided to study psychology instead, after suffering from occupational burnout as a law student. Devèze relocated permanently to Tahiti in 2023, in order to reconnect with her mother's culture and reaffirm her own Polynesian identity, and settled in the town of Māhina on the island's northern coast. While living in Tahiti, Devèze worked as a model, administrative assistant, and tour organizer, who organized electric bicycle trips for tourists on the island of Nuku Hiva in the Marquesas Islands.

== Pageantry ==
=== Miss Tahiti 2025 ===
In April 2025, Devèze was announced as one of the ten contestants for the upcoming Miss Tahiti 2025 pageant. She was first recruited for the pageant when she was 18 years old, but chose not to compete in order to focus on her studies. While living in metropolitan France, Devèze had also been recruited by the Miss Languedoc-Roussillon pageant, but decided that she would only be interested in competing for Miss Tahiti. She had first been inspired to compete for Miss France after watching Vaimalama Chaves of Tahiti win Miss France 2019. Prior to competing, Devèze had trained for the pageant for a year and a half along with the help of chaperone and coach Ihivai Germain. Upon the announcement of her participation, Devèze was widely considered by the Tahitian media to be the frontrunner to win the competition.

The pageant was held on 28 June at the town hall of Pīraʻe, after being delayed one day due to poor weather. Devèze was selected as one of the four finalists, and later ultimately crowned the winner by outgoing titleholder Temanava Domingo. Having made her connection to the Marquesas Islands a focal point during her candidacy, Devèze was considered to be the first winner of Miss Tahiti to come from the Marquesas Islands since Thérèse Heikapua Moke, crowned Miss Tahiti 1993.

=== Miss France 2026 ===
As Miss Tahiti, Devèze earned the right to represent French Polynesia at the Miss France 2026 competition. Miss France 2026 was held on 6 December 2025 at the Zénith d'Amiens in Amiens, the capital of the Somme department in Picardy. In the weeks leading up to the final, Devèze was considered by the French media to be the frontrunner to win the competition. Despite this, Devèze went on to state after winning that she did not enjoy being considered the frontrunner to win, as she felt that her small mistakes were scrutinized even more. As part of her pageant platform, Devèze chose to focus on mental health awareness, citing her own past struggles with depression and her older brother who suffers from mental illness as reasons for why she chose this as her advocacy.

During the competition, Devèze advanced from the initial pool of 30 contestants as one of the 12 semifinalists, and later as one of the five finalists. Afterwards, she was declared the winner of the competition, becoming the sixth entrant from French Polynesia to become Miss France. As part of her prize package for winning Miss France, Devèze received year-long access to a rent-free apartment in the 17th arrondissement of Paris, a monthly salary equivalent to that of a senior executive, and a Toyota Yaris Cross, among other gifts from sponsors, and the opportunity to work with the Miss France Company and its sponsors for the entire year. As was first announced in November 2025, Devèze will be accompanied by Camille Cerf, crowned Miss France 2015, as her official Miss France godmother for the duration of her reign; Cerf will provide Devèze with advice and guidance and accompany her to various events.

In her capacity as Miss France, Devèze modeled in Barcelona as the face of Festina, and appeared as a guest during season 15 of Danse avec les stars, at the 2026 Cannes Film Festival, at the 2026 French Open, and during Paris Fashion Week, among others.

Awards and achievements
Preceded by Angélique Angarni-Filopon	Miss France; 2026	Incumbent
Preceded by Temanava Domingo	Miss Tahiti; 2025	Succeeded by Leia Diard
