= Sally (internet personality) =

French influencer (born 1996)

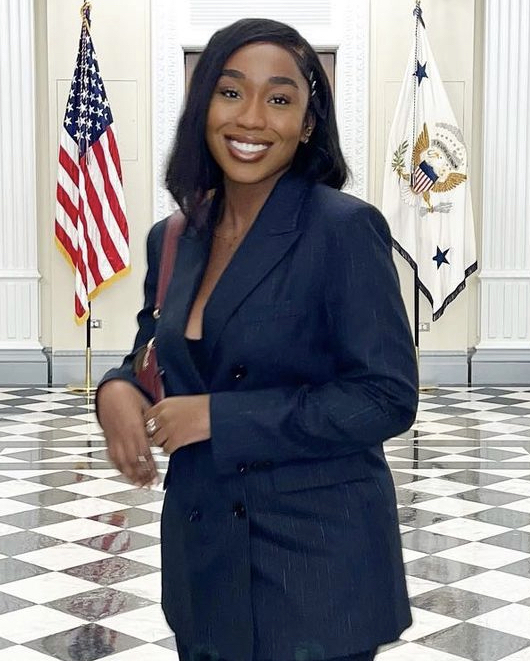
- Sally in 2022
- Born: Salima Jeanne Poumbga; 11 August 1996 (age 30); Strasbourg, France
- Other name: CrazySally
- Education: University of Strasbourg
- Occupations: Internet personality; influencer; journalist

YouTube information
- Channel: Sally
- Years active: 2018–present
- Genres: Interviews; docuseries; vlogs
- Subscribers: 781 thousand
- Views: 13.9 million
- Last updated: March 28, 2026

Salima Jeanne Poumbga (born 11 August 1996), known professionally as Sally or under her former pseudonym CrazySally, is a French internet personality, influencer, journalist, and former vlogger. Poumbga is known for analyzing current events on her social media platforms in addition to regularly conducting interviews with Francophone and international celebrities.

== Early life and education ==
Poumbga was born on 11 August 1996 in Strasbourg to a Cameroonian father and a Moroccan mother. At age 15, she received her baccalauréat diploma from Pontonniers International High School in Strasbourg, having skipped two grades in school. After completing secondary school, Poumbga studied law at the University of Strasbourg, eventually receiving a master's degree in criminal law. She had been inspired to become a lawyer after watching the American television series Law & Order and Suits. Following her legal training, Poumbga relocated to London and worked as a lawyer.

== Career ==
Poumbga began her career in 2018, making videos on fashion and beauty tips for haircare on her YouTube channel.

In July 2021, she took part in 2021 Cannes Film Festival.

In April 2024, Poumbga hosted the second edition of Les Flammes. She interviewed artists on the red carpet and presented the awards for female and male revelation.

In June 2024, she launched an original therapeutic podcast on several social topics, co-created with Spotify, titled Chez Sally.

On June 26, 2024, Poumbga carried the Olympic flame in her hometown of Strasbourg, ahead of the 2024 Summer Olympics.

=== Motherland ===
In 2021, Poumbga created Motherland, a miniseries dedicated to the discovery of countries after a 1-month stay. Poumbga directed episodes on the Ivory Coast, Senegal and Cameroon.

On March 31, 2022, Poumbga presented the premiere of the documentary Motherland. The aim of the documentary was to explore the African continent in a new way, deconstructing clichés that give Africa an unflattering image.

=== Oui Oui Baguette ===
In 2023, Poumbga launched the Oui Oui Baguette series on YouTube, inviting international celebrities to brunches with her. Since 2023, guests have included Offset, Ayra Starr, Zara Larsson, Denzel Washington, and Ariana Grande.

== Position statements ==
=== Invisibility of black female videographers on YouTube ===
In October 2020, Poumbga spoke on Clique about the invisibility of black female videographers on YouTube.

There's been a phenomenon of invisibilization of black female youtubers, where they've been sidelined and ignored by brands, even though black women are huge consumers. There really is a curtain between black female influencers and non-black female influencers in general. I've been meeting a lot of them lately who tell me “I've never seen your face in my suggestions”, even though I've got videos that are getting a million views. And it's true that I've never seen their faces in mine either.

— Sally

=== Dangers of Mym and OnlyFans ===
In January 2021, Poumbga warned of the dangers of MYM (a French alternative to OnlyFans) and OnlyFans, platforms for sharing and monetizing pornographic photos and videos. She noted that 40% of profiles were held by minors.

=== French legislative elections of 2024 ===
During the 2024 legislative elections, she took a stand against the rise of the extreme right in France.

== Filmography ==
- 2024: Les Flammes on W9 - host
- 2024: Les Traîtres (season 3) on M6 - contestant
- 2024: TedX (TEDxBrussels) - motivational speaker

=== Commercial ===
- Since 2023: Samsung

== Awards and nominations ==
Year	Award	Category	Result	Réf.
2022	People's Choice Awards	Social Star France	Nominated	
