= Saint-Agnan, Saône-et-Loire =

Saint-Agnan
- Commune
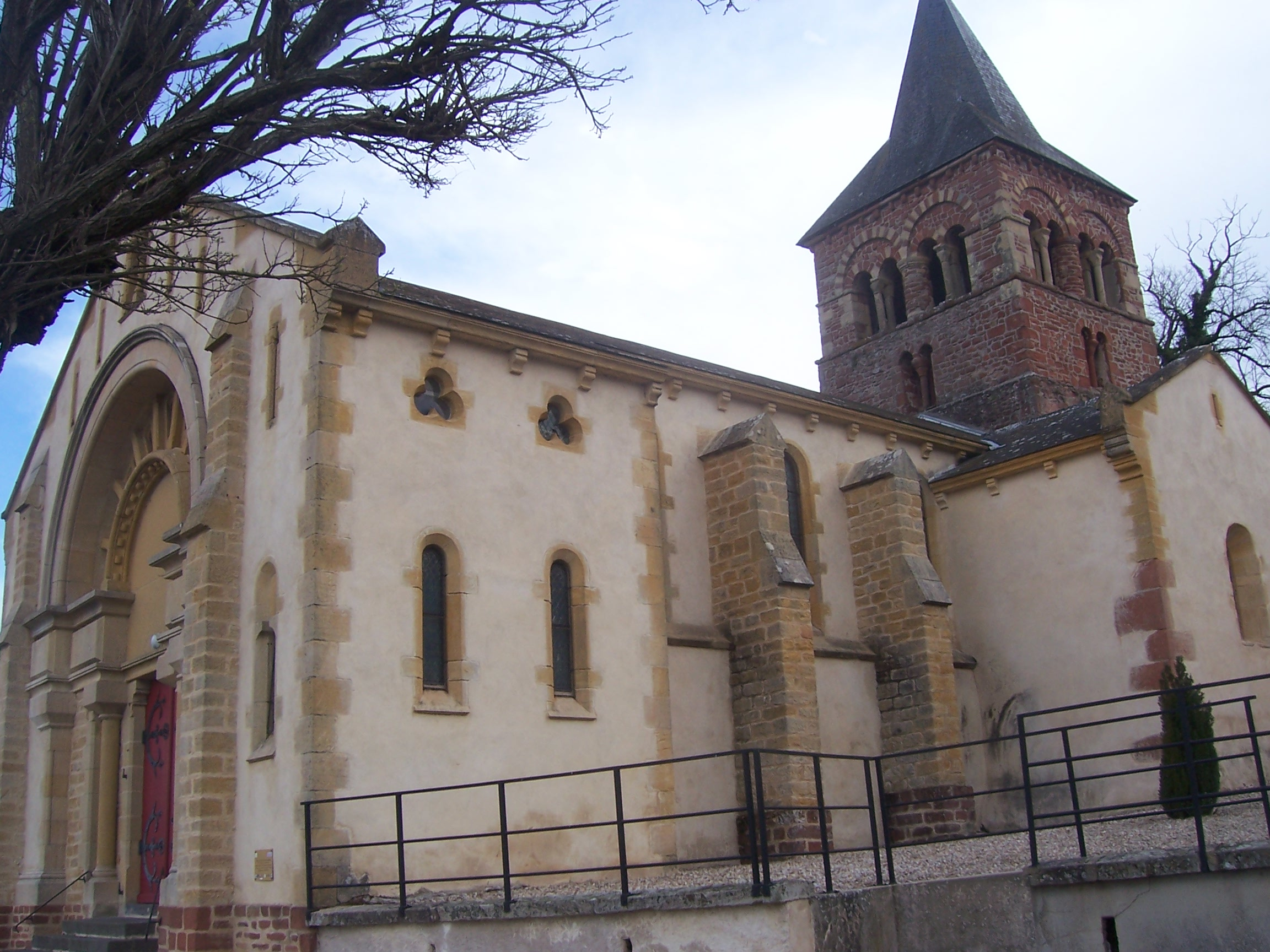
- The church in Saint-Agnan
- Location of Saint-Agnan
- Location within France Location within Bourgogne-Franche-Comté
- Coordinates: 46°30′20″N 3°52′51″E
- Country: France
- Region: Bourgogne-Franche-Comté
- Department: Saône-et-Loire
- Arrondissement: Charolles
- Canton: Digoin
- Area^{1}: 25.72 km^{2} (9.93 sq mi)
- Elevation: 288 m (945 ft)
- Highest elevation: 332 m (1,089 ft)
- Lowest elevation: 216 m (709 ft)
- Population (2023): 697
  - Density: 27.1/km^{2} (70.2/sq mi)
- Time zone: UTC+01:00 (CET)
  - Summer (DST): UTC+02:00 (CEST)
- INSEE/Postal code: 71382 /71160
- ^{1} French Land Register data, which excludes lakes, ponds, glaciers > 1 km^{2} (0.386 sq mi or 247 acres) and river estuaries.

Saint-Agnan (French pronunciation: [sɛ̃.t‿aɲɑ̃]) is a commune in the Saône-et-Loire department in the region of Bourgogne-Franche-Comté in eastern France.

== See also ==
- Communes of the Saône-et-Loire department
