= Miss France 1997 =

67th edition of the Miss France pageant

- Date: December 13, 1996
- Presenters: Jean-Pierre Foucault
- Venue: Futuroscope, Poitiers, Poitou-Charentes
- Broadcaster: TF1
- Entrants: 44
- Placements: 12
- Debuts: Miss Artois-Côte d'Opale; Miss Béarn; Miss Rouergue-Cévennes
- Withdrawals: Miss Cévennes; Miss Côte d'Azur; Miss Côte d'Opale; Miss Martinique
- Winner: Patricia Spehar; Paris

Miss France 1997, the 67th edition of the Miss France pageant, was held on December 13, 1996 at the Futuroscope in Vienne.

It was the first time that the pageant took place at the Futuroscope Congress Palace. Contestants traveled to Saint-Barthelemy for two weeks in November, and they repeated at the Futuroscope two weeks before the pageant and the final competition on December 13, 1996.

The event, held at the Futuroscope Congress Palace was broadcast live on TF1, with more than ten million viewers.

The president of the judging panel was a Frenchwoman Christiane Martel Aleman, who had been Miss Cinémonde 1953 and Miss Universe 1953, as well as a leading actress in Mexico in the 1960s.

The winner was Patricia Spehar of Paris was crowned Miss France 1997 by the outgoing title-holder Laure Belleville of Pays de Savoie, Miss France 1996. She has represented France at Miss Universe 1997 but unplaced. She also placed in top 15 at Miss International 1998. The first runner up, Marie Borg, has finished 1st runner-up at Miss International 1997.

== Results ==
=== Placements ===
Placement	Contestant
Miss France 1997	Paris – Patricia Spehar
1st Runner-Up	Toulouse Midi-Pyrénées – Marie Borg
2nd Runner-Up	Anjou – Sandrine Hamidi
3rd Runner-Up	Guadeloupe – Patricia Sellin
4th Runner-Up	Aquitaine – Maylis Ondicola
Top 12	Rhône-Alpes – Delphine Brossard (5th Runner-Up); Béarn – Anne-Sophie Vigno (6th Runner-Up); Auvergne – Catherine Sarret; Berry – Barbara Niewidtzala; Poitou-Charentes – Nancy Bourgeix; Hainaut – Caroline Lubrez; Provence – Pascale Delzenne

== Contestants ==
The 44 Miss France 1997 contestants were:

- (Tarn (department)) Albigeois - Elsa Mazzia
- Alsace - Lara Maringer
- (Duchy of Anjou) Anjou - Sandrine Hamidi
- Aquitaine - Maylis Ondicola
- Artois-Côte d'Opale - Virginie Tellier
- Auvergne - Catherine Sarret
- Béarn - Anne-Sophie Vigno
- (Berry, France) Berry - Barbara Niewidtzala
- Brittany - Severine Andre
- Burgundy - Stéphanie Sevat
- Caledonia - Carole Roudeillac
- (Gard) Camargue - Sandrine Montagud
- Champagne-Ardenne - Nathalie Frère
- (Poitou-Charentes) Charentes Poitou - Nancy Bourgeix
- (Haute-Garonne) Comminges - Carine Vincent
- Corsica - Delphine Cheuva
- (French Flanders) Flandre - Sarah Sumfleth
- Franche-Comté - Delphine Pequignet
- Gascony - Sabine Alves de Puga
- Guadeloupe - Patricia Sellin
- (French Hainaut) Hainaut - Caroline Lubrez
- Île-de-France - Audrey Legros
- Languedoc-Roussillon - Carole Pages
- Limousin - Stéphanie Leroy
- Lorraine - Manuela Pereira
- Lyon - Angélique Sage
- (Maine (province)) Maine - Angélique Monnier
- Normandy - Marianne Samson
- Orléanais - Mélanie Muller
- Paris - Patricia Spehar
- Pays d'Ain - Carine Boirot
- Pays de la Loire - Céline Bourban
- (Savoy) Pays de Savoie - Séverine Martin
- Pays du Velay - Amélie Fournel
- Périgord - Caren Claret
- Picardy - Magalie Lherminier
- Provence - Pascale Delzenne
- Quercy - Delphine Verdié
- Réunion - Fabienne Sabrimoutou
- Rhône-Alpes - Delphine Brossard
- (Aveyron) Rouergue-Cévennes - Aurore Pecrix
- (Saint-Étienne) (Loire (department)) St-Étienne-Loire - Christelle Arcis
- Toulouse Midi-Pyrénées - Marie Borg
- Touraine-Soulogne - Murielle Hoarau

== Ranking ==
=== First round ===
Order of announcement of the 12 semifinalists:

Numero	Contestant
1	Miss Anjou
2	Miss Aquitaine
3	Miss Auvergne
4	Miss Béarn
5	Miss Berry
6	Miss Charentes Poitou
7	Miss Guadeloupe
8	Miss Hainaut
9	Miss Paris
10	Miss Provence
11	Miss Rhône-Alpes
12	Miss Toulouse Midi-Pyrénées

=== Second round ===
Order of announcement of the 5 finalists:

Numero	Contestant
1	Miss Paris
2	Miss Guadeloupe
3	Miss Toulouse Midi-Pyrénées
4	Miss Anjou
5	Miss Aquitaine

== Judges ==
Member
Christiane Martel (president)	Miss Universe 1953
Loris Azzaro	Fashion designer et perfumer
Thierry Roland	Sports commentator
Nathalie Simon	Television presenter
Christian Morin	Journalist
Chantal Bouvier de Lamotte	Miss France 1972
Didier Six	Footballer
Nathalie Marquay	Miss France 1987
Guy Lux	Television presenter and producer
Jean-Edern Hallier	Writer and journalist
Jean Barthet	Milliner
Cécile Muller	President of Committee Miss Belgium

== Notes about the placements ==
- Paris wins for the thirteenth time in the Miss France pageant after eleven years drought.
- Guadeloupe is placed for third consecutive year.
- Anjou, Charentes Poitou, Hainaut and Provence are placed for second consecutive year.
- Auvergne is placed for the first time since the Miss France 1991 pageant.
- Aquitaine, Berry, Paris et Toulouse are placed for the first time since the Miss France 1995 pageant.
- Béarn et Rhône-Alpes are placed for the first time.

== Crossovers ==
Contestants who previously competed or will be competing at international beauty pageants:

Miss Universe

- 1997: Paris - Patricia Spehar
  - (Miami Beach, United States)

Miss International

- 1997: Toulouse - Marie Borg (2nd Runner-up)
  - (Kyoto, Japan)
- 1998: Paris - Patricia Spehar (Top 15)
  - (Tokyo, Japan)
