= Gilis =

Gilis or Ģīlis is a surname. Notable people with the surname include:

- Jānis Gilis (1943–2000), Latvian footballer
- Antoine Gilis (1702–1781), French musician and composer
- Valdis Ģīlis (born 1954), Latvian politician

== See also ==
- Gillis (disambiguation)
  - Gillis (surname)
- McGillis
- Gilles (surname)
- Gillies
- Gilliss
