= Gilly (disambiguation) =

Gilly is a municipality in Switzerland.

Gilly may also refer to:

== Places ==
- Gilly, Belgium, a section of the town of Charleroi
  - Gilly (Charleroi Metro), an underground station

== People ==
=== Surname ===
- Adolfo Gilly (1928–2023), Argentine-born Mexican author and professor of history and political science
- Charles Louis Gilly (1911–1970), American botanist
- David Gilly (1748–1808), German architect
- Dinh Gilly (1877–1940), French-Algerian operatic baritone and teacher
- Friedrich Gilly (1772–1800), German architect, son of David Gilly
- Hermann Gilly (1894–1944), German First World War flying ace and Second World War Luftwaffe officer
- Jacques Laurent Gilly, French Napoleonic general
- William Gilly, American biologist specializing in the study of cephalopods
- William Stephen Gilly (1789–1855), English cleric and author

=== Given name ===
- Gilly Flaherty (born 1991), female English footballer
- Gilly Flower (1908–2001), English actress
- Gilly Lane (born 1985), American squash player
- Gilly or Gelli Meyrick (1556–1601), Welsh supporter of Robert Devereux, 2nd Earl of Essex, and conspirator in Essex's rebellion
- Gilly Salmon (born 1949), English academic in the field of digital learning
- Gilly Szego (born 1932), British artist

=== Nickname ===
- Gilly Campbell (1908–1973), American Major League Baseball catcher
- Gilly Coman (1955–2010), English actress
- Adam Gilchrist (born 1971), Australian former cricketer
- Gilly Reay (1887–1967), English first-class cricketer
- Gilly Williams (1719–1805), English Receiver-General of Excise, wit and letter writer

== Characters ==
- Title character of The Great Gilly Hopkins, a 1978 children's novel and film adaptation by Katherine Paterson
- Geillis "Gilly" Ramsey, heroine of Thornyhold, a 1988 fantasy novel by Mary Stewart
- Gilly Roach, on the soap opera Hollyoaks
- Gilly (Saturday Night Live), a recurring character in the television series
- Gilly (A Song of Ice and Fire), a character in George R. R. Martin's A Song of Ice and Fire novel series and Game of Thrones television series

== See also ==
- Gilley (disambiguation)
- Gillie (disambiguation)
