= Gillis (surname) =

Gillis, also spelled Gilliss, is the surname of:

== People ==
- Alan Gillis (1936–2022), Irish politician
- Ann Gillis (1927–2018), American actress
- Brad Gillis (born 1957), American musician
- Christopher Gillis (1951–1993), Canadian dancer and choreographer
- Clarence Gillis (1895–1960), Canadian politician
- Don Gillis (composer) (1912–1978), American composer, conductor and teacher
- Don Gillis (sportscaster) (1922–2008), American radio and television personality
- Duncan Gillis (1883–1963), Canadian athlete
- Gregg Gillis (born 1981), American musician known as Girl Talk
- Hugh Gillis (1918–2013), American politician
- Iyone Gillis (1923–2015), American adventurer
- James Gillis (bishop) (1802–1864), Scottish bishop
- James Henry Gillis (1831–1910), United States Navy rear admiral
- James Lisle Gillis (1792–1881), American politician
- James Melville Gilliss (1811–1865), American astronomer, United States naval officer and founder of the United States Naval Observatory
- Jamie Gillis (1943–2010), American porn star
- John Anthony Gillis (born 1975), American musician known as Jack White
- John F. Gillis (1843–1899), Canadian politician
- John P. Gillis (1803–1873), United States Navy commodore
- John Gillis (historian), American historian
- Laurence J. Gillis, American politician
- Leon Gillis (1920–2010), American adventurer
- Mason Gillis (born 2000), American college basketball player
- Michael Gillis (1949–2007), American academic
- Paulina Gillis, Canadian actress known as Tabitha St. Germain
- Peter B. Gillis (1952–2024), American comic book writer
- Pieter Gillis (1486–1533), European humanist and printer
- Sean Vincent Gillis (born 1962), American serial killer
- Shane Gillis (born 1987), American stand-up comedian
- S. Malcolm Gillis (1940–2015), American academic
- William Gillis (businessman) (1788–1869), American fur trader, real estate developer and pioneer

== Fictional characters ==
- title character of The Many Loves of Dobie Gillis, a 1951 collection of short stories and a 1959-1963 American TV series
- Joe Gillis, male lead character in the film Sunset Boulevard, played by William Holden
- Willie Gillis, a fictional World War II soldier created by Norman Rockwell
- Officer Willie Gillis, a police officer in The Rookies, a 1970s TV series

== See also ==
- Maya Gilliss-Chapman, Cambodian-American social entrepreneur
- Gillis (disambiguation)
- McGillis
- Gilis
- Gilles (surname)
- Gilliss
- Gillies
