= Miss International Guadeloupe =

Beauty contest

- Formation: 2003
- Type: Beauty pageant
- Headquarters: Basse-Terre
- Location: Guadeloupe
- Members: Miss Universe; Miss World; The Miss Globe; Miss Earth; Miss Cosmo
- Official language: French
- President: Georges Nandan
- Website: Official site

Miss Guadeloupe International is a national beauty pageant responsible for selecting Guadeloupe's representatives to international pageants. This pageant is not related to Miss Guadeloupe where the winner traditionally competes at Miss France contest.

== History ==
=== 1977–1985 ===
Miss Guadeloupe pageant has been known since 1977 when the island competed at the Miss Universe pageant. Since 1984, the island has joined Miss France contest as overseas department of the country. In 1985, it boycotted the Miss Universe pageant because of the pageant not allowing the island to compete in a national competition as a region.

=== 2003–2023 ===
Since 2003 Guadeloupe allows winners to compete at the Miss World contest. The "Miss International Guadeloupe" contest sends its winner to the Miss World. While runners-up competed at the Miss International and Miss Earth pageants.

Gallery

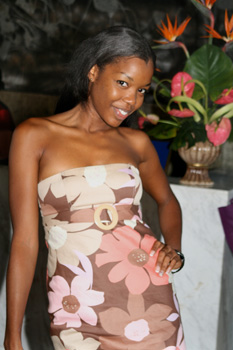
Nancy Karen Fleurival, Miss World Guadeloupe 2007, who competed in Miss World 2007 and Miss International 2008.

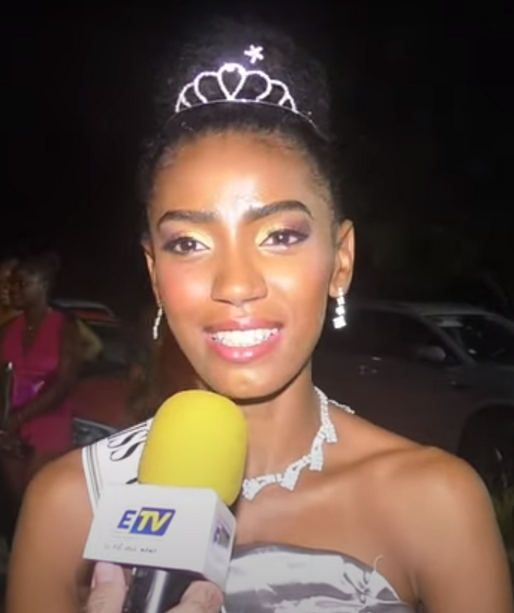
Laura Ballonad, who was crowned Miss Grand Guadeloupe 2023 in the Miss International Guadeloupe 2023 pageant.

=== 2021 ===
In 2021, The Miss Guadeloupe International organization acquired the Miss Universe license to send its only representative to the Miss Universe pageant. The delegates supposed to compete as "Miss Universe Sin Marteen & Guadeloupe" in the pageant but it was not approved by Miss Universe Organization.

=== 2024 ===
In 2024, the Miss Universe Organization introduced a new regulation allowing any territory to return to the competition, provided they hold a Miss Universe license. Guadeloupe was officially approved to return after many years and competed as a French territory at Miss Universe 2024 in Mexico.

== Titles ==
Number of wins from Miss Guadeloupe International (current licenses)
| Pageant | Wins |
|---|---|
| Miss Universe | 0 |
| Miss World | 0 |
| The Miss Globe | 0 |
| Miss Earth | 0 |
| Miss International | 0 |
| Miss Supranational | 0 |
| Miss Grand International | 0 |
| Miss Cosmo | 0 |

Note that the year designates the time Miss Guadeloupe International has acquired that particular pageant franchise.

== Titleholders ==
Miss Universe Guadeloupe
Miss World Guadeloupe

| Year | Miss International Guadeloupe/Miss Univers Guadeloupe (began 2024) |
|---|---|
| 2003 | Lauranza Doliman |
| 2004 | Jennifer Desbouiges |
| 2005 | Merita Melyna |
| 2006 | Caroline Virgile Bevis |
| 2007 | Nancy Fleurival |
| 2008 | Frédérika Charpentier |
| 2009 | Béatrice Blaise |
| 2010 | Ericka Aly |
| 2011 | Violaine Grainville |
| 2012 | Brigitte Golabkan |
| 2013 | Sheryna van der Koelen |
| 2014 | Wendy Metony |
| 2015 | Arlène Tacite |
| 2016 | Magalie Adelson |
| 2017 | Audrey Berville |
| 2018 | Morgane Thérésine |
| 2019 | Anaïs Lacalmontie |
| 2021 | Danitzia Logis |
| 2023 | Marine Minos |
| 2024 | Coraly Desplan |
| 2025 | Ophély Mézino |
| 2026 | Chloé Deher |

== Guadeloupean at international pageants ==
=== Miss Universe Guadeloupe ===
- : Declared as Winner
- : Ended as runner-up or top 5/6 qualification
- : Ended as one of the finalists or semifinalists
- : Ended as special awards winner

| Year | Miss Universe Guadeloupe | Placement at Miss Universe | Special awards |
Georges Nandan directorship — a franchise holder to Miss Universe from 2024.
| 2026 | Chloé Deher | TBA | |
| 2025 | Ophély Mézino | Top 12 | |
| 2024 | Coraly Desplan | Unplaced | |
Did not compete between 2022—2023
| 2021 | Danitzia Logis | Did not compete | |
Miss Guadeloupe directorship — a franchise holder to Miss Universe from 1977—1984.
Did not compete between 1985—2020
| 1984 | Martine Seremes | Unplaced | |
| 1983 | Nicole LeBorgne | Unplaced | |
| 1982 | Lydia Martine Galin | Unplaced | |
| 1981 | Rosette Bivouac | Unplaced | |
| 1980 | Elydie Billioti De Gage | Unplaced | |
| 1977 | Catherine Reinette | Unplaced | |

=== Miss Monde Guadeloupe ===
- : Declared as Winner
- : Ended as runner-up or top 5/6 qualification
- : Ended as one of the finalists or semifinalists
- : Ended as special awards winner

| Year | Miss Monde Guadeloupe | Placement at Miss World | Special awards |
Georges Nandan directorship — a franchise holder to Miss World from 2003.
| 2025 | Noémie Kribo Milne | Unplaced | |
Miss World 2023 was rescheduled to 2024 due to the change of host and when entering India as the new host, there were several issues that caused the postponement until March 2024.
| 2023 | Marie Hatchi | Unplaced | |
Miss World 2021 was rescheduled to 16 March 2022 due to the COVID-19 pandemic outbreak in Puerto Rico, no edition started in 2022.
| 2021 | Prescilla Larose | Unplaced | |
Due to the impact of COVID-19 pandemic, no competition held in 2020
| 2019 | Anaïs Lacalmontie | Unplaced | |
| 2018 | Morgane Thérésine | Unplaced | |
| 2017 | Audrey Berville | Unplaced | |
| 2016 | Magalie Adelson | Unplaced | |
| 2015 | Arlène Tacite | Unplaced | |
| 2014 | Wendy Metony | Unplaced | |
| 2013 | Sheryna van der Koelen | Unplaced | |
| 2012 | Brigitte Golabkan | Top 30 | |
| 2011 | Violaine Grainville | Unplaced | |
| 2010 | Ericka Aly | Unplaced | |
| 2009 | Béatrice Blaise | Unplaced | |
| 2008 | Frédérika Charpentier | Unplaced | |
| 2007 | Nancy Fleurival | Unplaced | |
| 2006 | Caroline Virgile Bevis | Unplaced | |
| 2005 | Merita Melyna | Unplaced | |
| 2004 | Jennifer Desbouiges | Unplaced | |
| 2003 | Lauranza Doliman | Unplaced | |

=== The Miss Globe Guadeloupe ===
- : Declared as Winner
- : Ended as runner-up or top 5 qualification
- : Ended as one of the finalists or semifinalists
- : Ended as special awards winner

| Year | The Miss Globe Guadeloupe | Placement at The Miss Globe | Special awards |
Georges Nandan directorship — a franchise holder to The Miss Globe from 2026.
| 2026 | Marie Hatchi | TBA | |
