= Gillis =

Gillis or Gilliss may refer to:

== People and fictional characters ==
- Gillis (given name), a list of people
- Gillis (surname), a list of people and fictional characters named Gillis or Gilliss

== Places ==
- Gillis, Louisiana, United States, an unincorporated community and census-designated place
- Gillis Range, a mountain range in Nevada, United States
- Gilliss Seamount, a seamount in the Atlantic Ocean off the coast of Massachusetts, United States

== Ships ==
- USS Gillis (1919-1945), a United States Navy destroyer
- USS James M. Gilliss (AMCU-13), a minesweeper
- USNS James M. Gilliss (T-AGOR-4), an oceanographic research ship

== Other uses ==
- Gillis Centre, a complex of historical buildings in Edinburgh, Scotland
- Gillis College a former seminary in Edinburgh, Scotland

== See also ==
- Gilli (disambiguation)
- Gillies
