= Gilli (surname) =

Gilli is a surname. Notable people with the surname include:

- Alexander Gilli (1904–2007), Austrian botanist
- Anna Caterina Gilli, Italian painter
- Carlotta Gilli (born 2001), Italian Paralympic swimmer
- Christina Gilli-Brügger (born 1956), Swiss cross-country skier
- Christoph Gilli (1963–2010), Swiss footballer
- Filippo Gilli (born 2000), Italian footballer
- Luciana Gilli (born 1944), Italian actress
- Markus Gilli (born 1955), Swiss journalist
- Pierina Gilli (1911–1991), Italian Catholic visionary
- Yvonne Gilli (born 1957), Swiss politician

== See also ==
- Gilli (disambiguation)
