= Gilley =

Gilley may refer to:

== Places ==
=== France ===
- Gilley, Doubs, a commune
- Gilley, Haute-Marne, a commune

=== United States ===
- Gilley, Kentucky, an unincorporated community
- Gilley, Virginia, an unincorporated community

== People ==
- Jeremy Gilley (born 1969), British actor turned film-maker and founder of the non-profit organization Peace One Day
- Mickey Gilley (1936–2022), American country musician
- Paul Gilley (1929–1957), American country musician
- Sam Gilley (born 1994), English professional boxer
- Smith Gilley (1939–2026), American politician

== See also ==
- Gillie (disambiguation)
- Gilly (disambiguation)
