= Gilles (surname) =

Gilles is a surname. Notable people with the surname include:

- Alexe Gilles (born 1992), American figure skater, sister of Piper and Todd Gilles
- Eve Gilles (born 2003), French model, beauty pageant titleholder, and Miss France 2024
- Herbert Michael Gilles (1921–2015), British-Maltese physician and professor of tropical medicine
- Jean Gilles (composer) (1668–1705), French composer
- Jean Gilles (French Army officer) (1904–1961), French general
- Osmond Gilles (1788–1866), settler, pastoralist, mine owner and first colonial treasurer of South Australia
- Piper Gilles (born 1992), American figure skater, sister of Alexe and Todd Gilles
- Ralph Gilles (born 1970), American automobile designer and executive at Stellantis
- Todd Gilles (born 1986), American figure skater, brother of Alexe and Piper Gilles
- Werner Gilles (1894–1961), German painter

== See also ==
- Gilles (given name)
- Gillies
- Gillis (surname)
- Gilliss
