= Diane Leyre =

French beauty pageant contestant (born 1997)

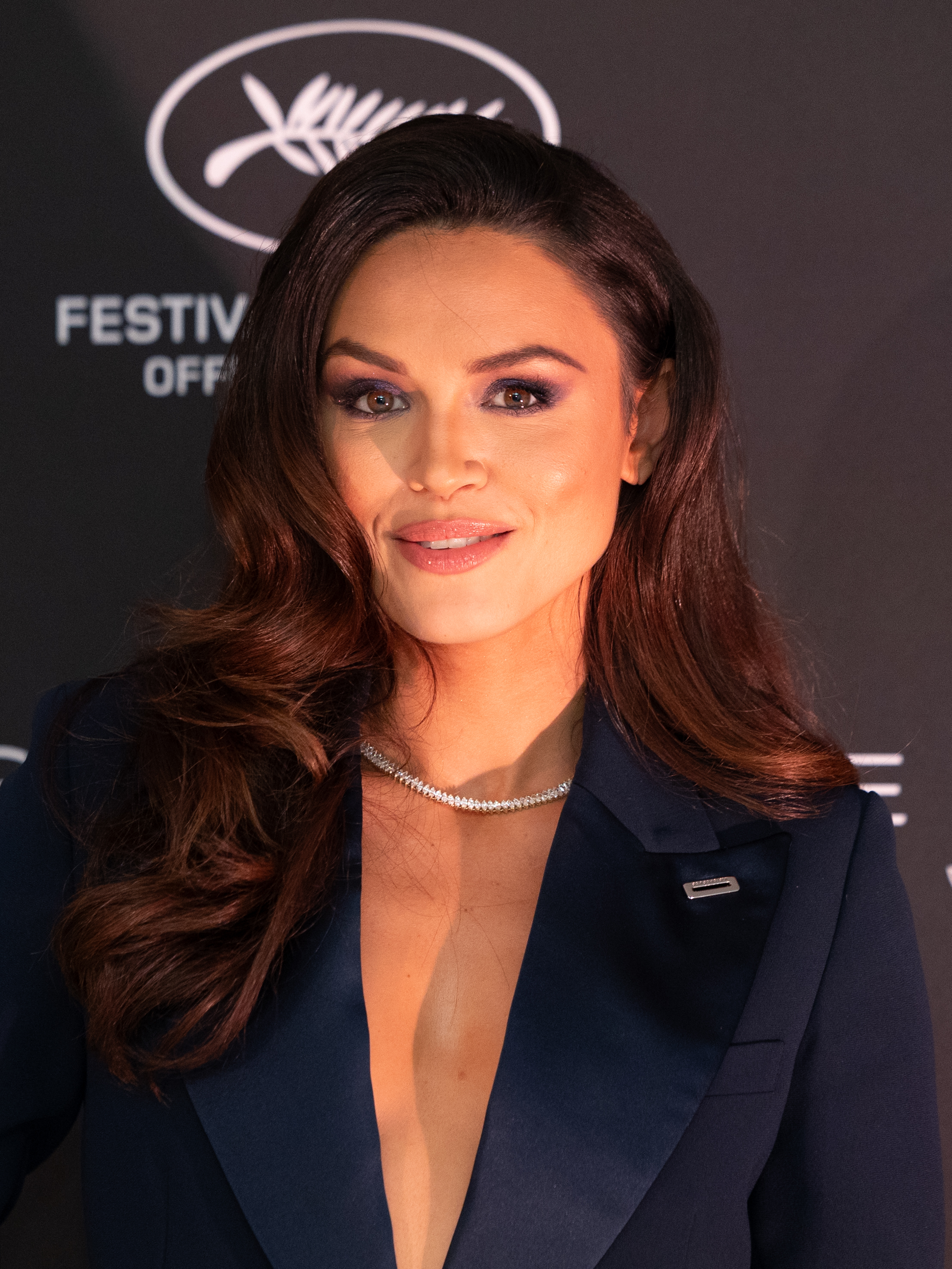
- Leyre at the 2026 Cannes Film Festival
- Born: 10 July 1997 (age 29); Neuilly-sur-Seine, France
- Education: IE University Madrid (BBA)
- Occupations: Model; radio personality
- Height: 1.77 m (5 ft 9 1/2 in)
- Beauty pageant titleholder
- Title: Miss Paris 2021; Miss Île-de-France 2021; Miss France 2022
- Hair color: Brown
- Eye color: Brown
- Major competitions: Miss France 2022 (Winner); Miss Universe 2023 (Unplaced)

Diane Leyre (born 10 July 1997) is a French model, radio personality, and beauty pageant titleholder who was crowned Miss France 2022. She had previously been crowned Miss Île-de-France 2021 and Miss Paris 2021, and is the sixteenth woman from Île-de-France to win Miss France. Leyre represented France at Miss Universe 2023.

From August 2022 to July 2023, Leyre was a cohost on the Europe 2 daily morning show Le Morning sans filtre, with Guillaume Genton and Fabien Delettres.

== Early life and education ==
Leyre was born in Neuilly-sur-Seine to parents André and Sabine Leyre. Her father is a real estate developer, originally from the Gard department in Languedoc-Roussillon, who moved to Paris for better opportunities, while her mother is a former flight attendant. She has an elder brother, while she is also the cousin of Illana Barry, who was crowned Miss Languedoc-Roussillon 2020 and competed at Miss France 2021. Leyre moved out of her family home at age 17, living in a studio apartment in the same apartment complex as her parents, while working to pay her rent.

Leyre was educated at the Institut Privé de l'Alma, a private lycée in the 7th arrondissement of Paris. After graduating with her baccalauréat in economics and social sciences with honors, Leyre completed one year of law school before moving to Madrid to enroll in IE University, later graduating with a Bachelor of Business Administration degree. At the time of her enrollment, Leyre spoke only minimal Spanish and English, but later became fluent in both languages. After graduating, Leyre settled in Paris and began working with the real estate development company Jadley, based in the 7th arrondissement.

== Pageantry ==
=== Miss Île-de-France ===
Leyre began her pageantry career in 2021, after registering as a contestant in Miss Paris 2021. She opted to compete after seeing her cousin Illana Barry compete at Miss France 2021, and amidst encouragement from friends. She ultimately went on to win the title, which qualified her to compete in Miss Île-de-France 2021. Leyre crowned Océane Bobèche as her successor at Miss Paris 2022 on 21 June 2022.

Leyre later competed in Miss Île-de-France 2021 as well on 3 October 2021, and won the title. As Miss Île-de-France, she received the right to represent the region at Miss France 2022. Leyre crowned Adèle Bonnamour as her successor at Miss Île-de-France 2022, on 22 October 2022.

=== Miss France ===
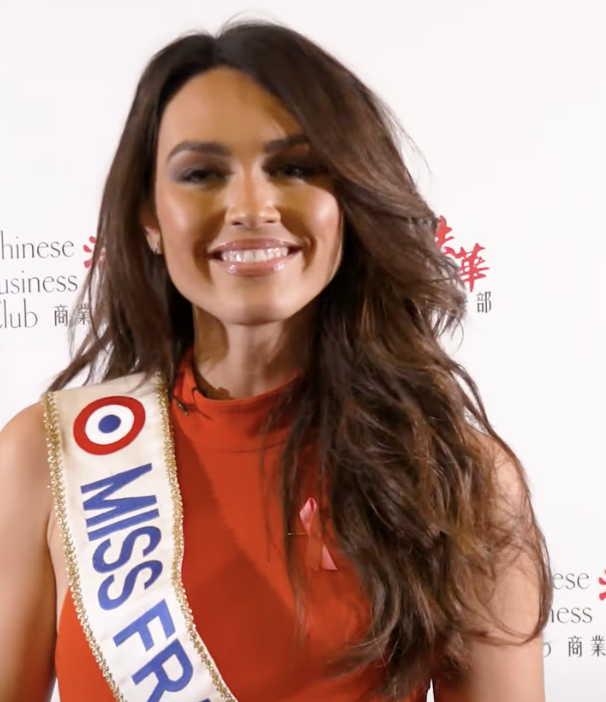
Leyre in 2022

Miss France 2022 was held on 11 December 2021 at the Zénith de Caen in Caen. Prior to the start of the competition, she had already been one of the frontrunners to win. Leyre competed in the finals, where she advanced to the top fifteen and later the top five. During the competition, she received media attention for using a baguette as an accessory for her regional costume, and for stumbling on stage in her evening gown. At the end of the pageant, Leyre was declared the winner, being crowned by outgoing titleholder Amandine Petit of Normandy, becoming the sixteenth woman from Île-de-France to win the title.

As Miss France, Leyre was awarded a number of prizes and rewards, including more than €57,000 in gifts from sponsors, a year-long residence in a luxury Paris apartment, and an undisclosed monthly salary the equivalent of a senior executive in France. After winning the title, Leyre was given the opportunity to appear at numerous events in France and internationally. Among these events included being a contestant in Fort Boyard, a guest at the 2022 French Open and 2022 Cannes Film Festival, and working as a promotional model in cities such as Barcelona.

Leyre was originally set to represent France at either Miss Universe 2022 or Miss World 2022, but was replaced by Floriane Bascou, her first runner-up, and Clémence Botino, Miss France 2020, respectively, at the two competitions. Leyre released a statement stating that she would not compete internationally as she did not have enough time to prepare for the pageants, due to her schedule as the incumbent Miss France titleholder. Leyre completed her reign as Miss France on 17 December 2022 at Miss France 2023, where she crowned Indira Ampiot of Guadeloupe as her successor.

In July 2023, it was announced that Leyre would represent France at Miss Universe 2023, where she ultimately did not advance to the Top 20.

== Post-pageantry ==
In August 2022, while reigning as Miss France, Leyre became a cohost on the Europe 2 daily morning show Le Morning sans filtre, with Guillaume Genton and Fabien Delettres. She continued her role on the program following the end of her reign in December 2022. The show concluded in July 2023.

In January 2024, Leyre was announced as a celebrity contestant in season 13 of Danse avec les stars, the French version of Dancing with the Stars. She was eliminated in the 22 March episode, becoming the third celebrity eliminated from the competition. In June 2025, it was announced that Leyre would appear as a celebrity contestant on the M6 game show Murder Party au musée, hosted by Francis Huster.

== Filmography ==
Year	Title	Role	Notes
2022	Good Singers	Herself (Investigator)	1 episode
2022	Le Grand Quiz	Herself	1 episode; contestant
2023	Fort Boyard	Herself	1 episode; contestant
2023	Ici tout commence	Herself	1 episode
2024	Danse avec les stars	Herself	season 13; contestant
2025	Murder Party au musée	Herself	Contestant

Awards and achievements
Preceded by Amandine Petit	Miss France; 2022	Succeeded by Indira Ampiot
Preceded by Floriane Bascou	Miss Universe France; 2023	Succeeded by Indira Ampiot
Preceded by Lara Lourenço	Miss Île-de-France; 2021	Succeeded by Adèle Bonnamour
Preceded by Lina Ben Youssef	Miss Paris; 2021	Succeeded by Océane Bobèche
