= Gylys =

- Lithuanian surname
- m.: Gylys
- f.: (unmarried): Gylytė
- f.: (married): Gylienė

Gylys is a Lithuanian language family name. The word literally means "botfly".

The surname may refer to:

- Beth Gylys (born 1964), American poet and professor
- Povilas Gylys, Lithuanian politician

== See also ==
- Gilis
