= Frédéric Tejou =

Guadeloupean footballer (born 1987)

Personal information
- Full name: Frédéric Alexandre Tejou
- Date of birth: 13 July 1987 (age 39)
- Place of birth: Basse-Terre, Guadeloupe, France
- Height: 1.94 m (6 ft 4 in)
- Position: Goalkeeper

Team information
- Current team: La Gauloise

Senior career*
Years	Team	Apps	(Gls)
2006–2007	RC Basse-Terre		
2007–2011	La Gauloise		
2011–2012	Etoile Carmel		
2012–2014	La Gauloise		
2014–2016	USR		
2016–2018	Gourbeyre		
2018–	La Gauloise		

International career^{‡}
2015–	Guadeloupe	5	(0)
- * Club domestic league appearances and goals as of 03:44, 6 July 2021 (UTC) ‡ National team caps and goals as of 03:44, 6 July 2021 (UTC)

Frédéric Alexandre Tejou (born 13 July 1987) is a French professional footballer from Guadeloupe who plays as a goalkeeper for the club La Gauloise, and the Guadeloupe national team.

== International career ==
Ajax debuted with the Guadeloupe national team in a 2–0 friendly loss to Martinique on 26 December 2015. He was called up to represent Guadeloupe at the 2021 CONCACAF Gold Cup.

== Personal life ==
Tejou is the uncle of Indira Ampiot, who was crowned Miss France 2023.
