= Danse avec les stars season 13 =

Season of French television series

Danse avec les stars
- Season 13
- Celebrity winner: Natasha St-Pier
- Professional winner: Anthony Colette
- No. of episodes: 10

Release
- Original network: TF1
- Original release: 16 February – 26 April 2024

Season chronology
- ← Previous; Season 12 Next → Season 14

The thirteenth season of Danse avec les stars (the French version of Strictly Come Dancing) premiered on 16 February 2024 on TF1, hosted by Camille Combal.

Things To Know Caroline Margeridon was a panelist on Affaire Conclue and the host of the show Sophie Davant will appear 1 year later James Denton was asked to compete on the American Version but refuses

== Participants ==
| Celebrity | Known for | Partner | Status |
|---|---|---|---|
| Caroline Margeridon | Businesswoman | Christian Millette | Eliminated 1st on 8 March 2024 |
| Cœur de pirate | Singer-songwriter | Nicolas Archambault | Eliminated 2nd on 15 March 2024 |
| Diane Leyre | Miss France 2022 & model | Yann-Alrick Mortreuil | Eliminated 3rd on 22 March 2024 |
| Cristina Córdula | Television presenter, stylist & former model | Jordan Mouillerac | Eliminated 4th on 29 March 2024 |
| Adeline Toniutti | Singer & Star Academy coach | Adrien Caby | Eliminated 5th on 5 April 2024 |
| Black M | Rapper | Elsa Bois | Eliminated 6th & 7th on 12 April 2024 |
| James Denton | Actor | Candice Pascal | Eliminated 6th & 7th on 12 April 2024 |
| Roman Doduik | Comedian & actor | Ana Riera | Eliminated 8th on 19 April 2024 |
| Keiona Revlon | Drag queen & Drag Race France winner | Maxime Dereymez | Eliminated 9th on 19 April 2024 |
| Inès Reg | Comedian & actress | Christophe Licata | Third Place on 26 April 2024 |
| Nico Capone | Social media personality | Inès Vandamme | Runner up on 26 April 2024 |
| Natasha St-Pier | Singer-songwriter | Anthony Colette | Winners on 26 April 2024 |

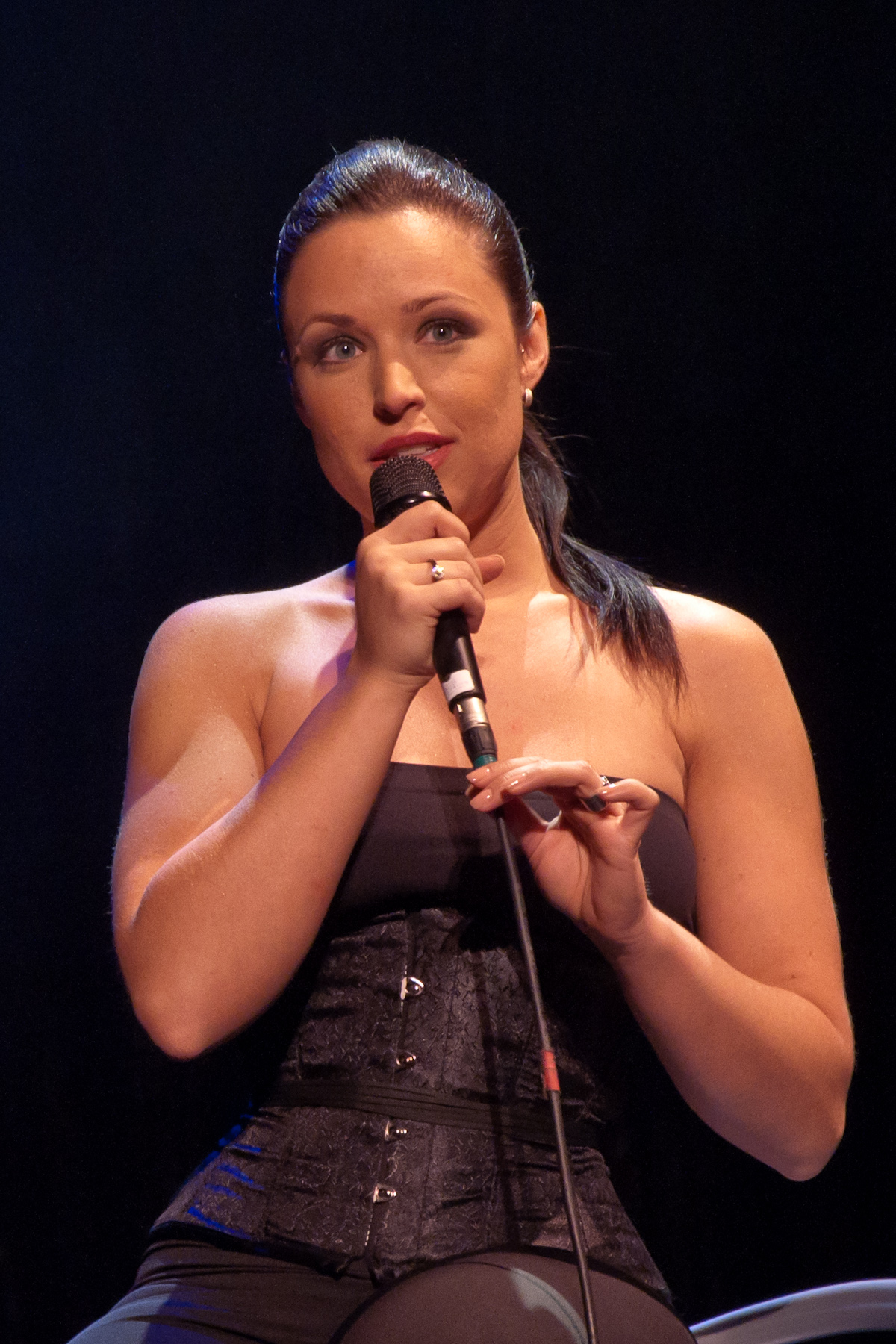
Natasha St-Pier

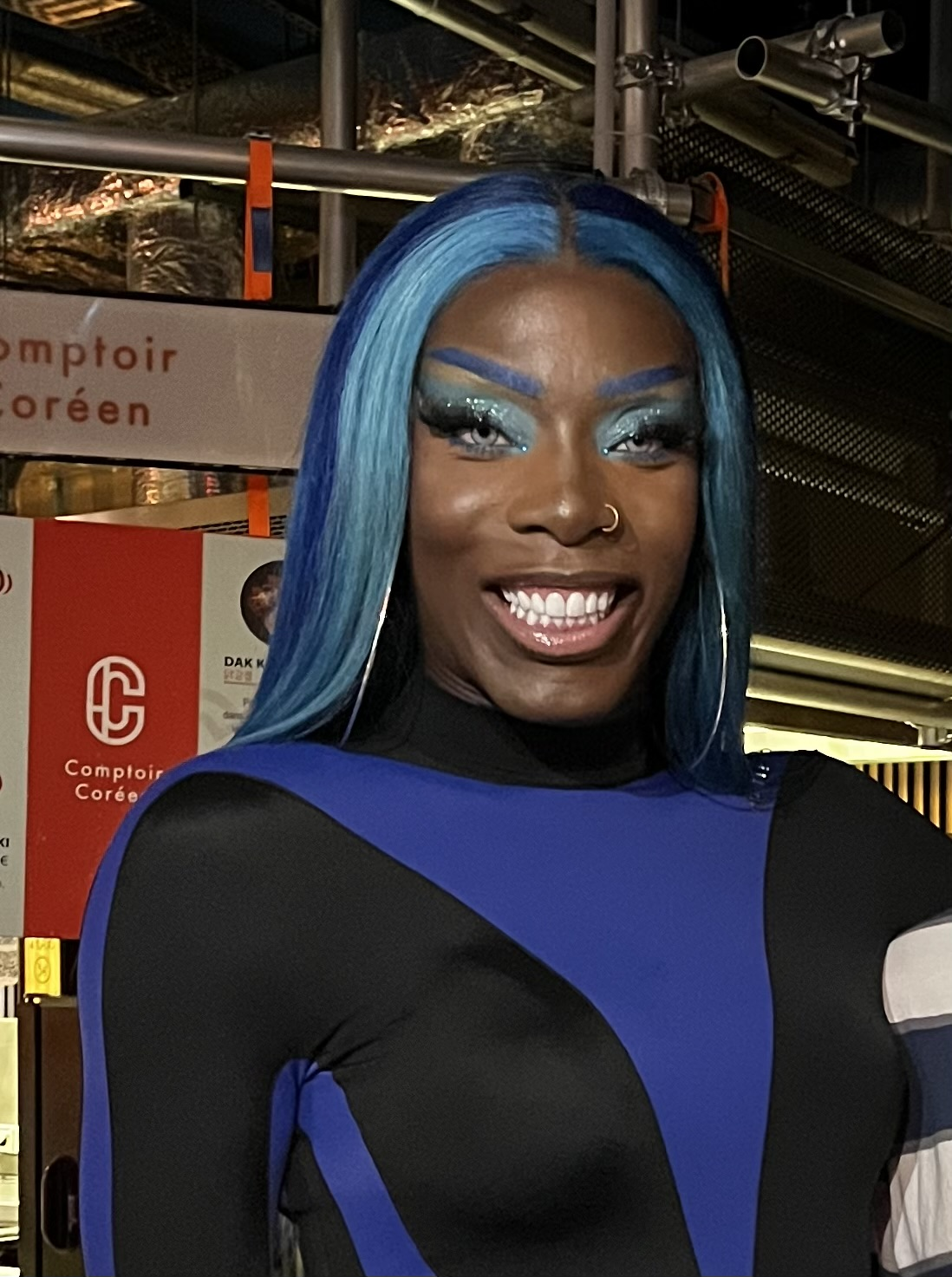
Keiona Revlon

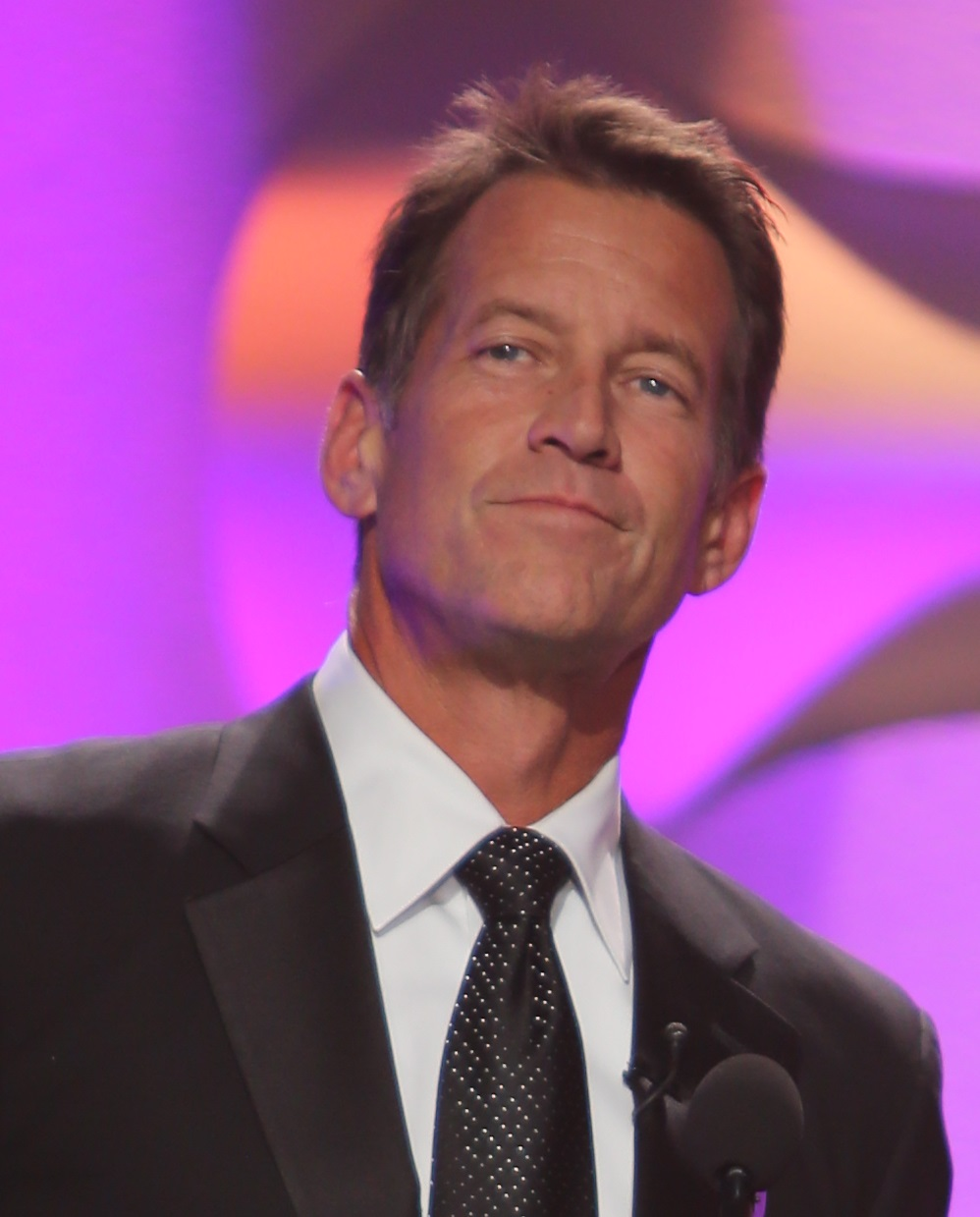
James Denton

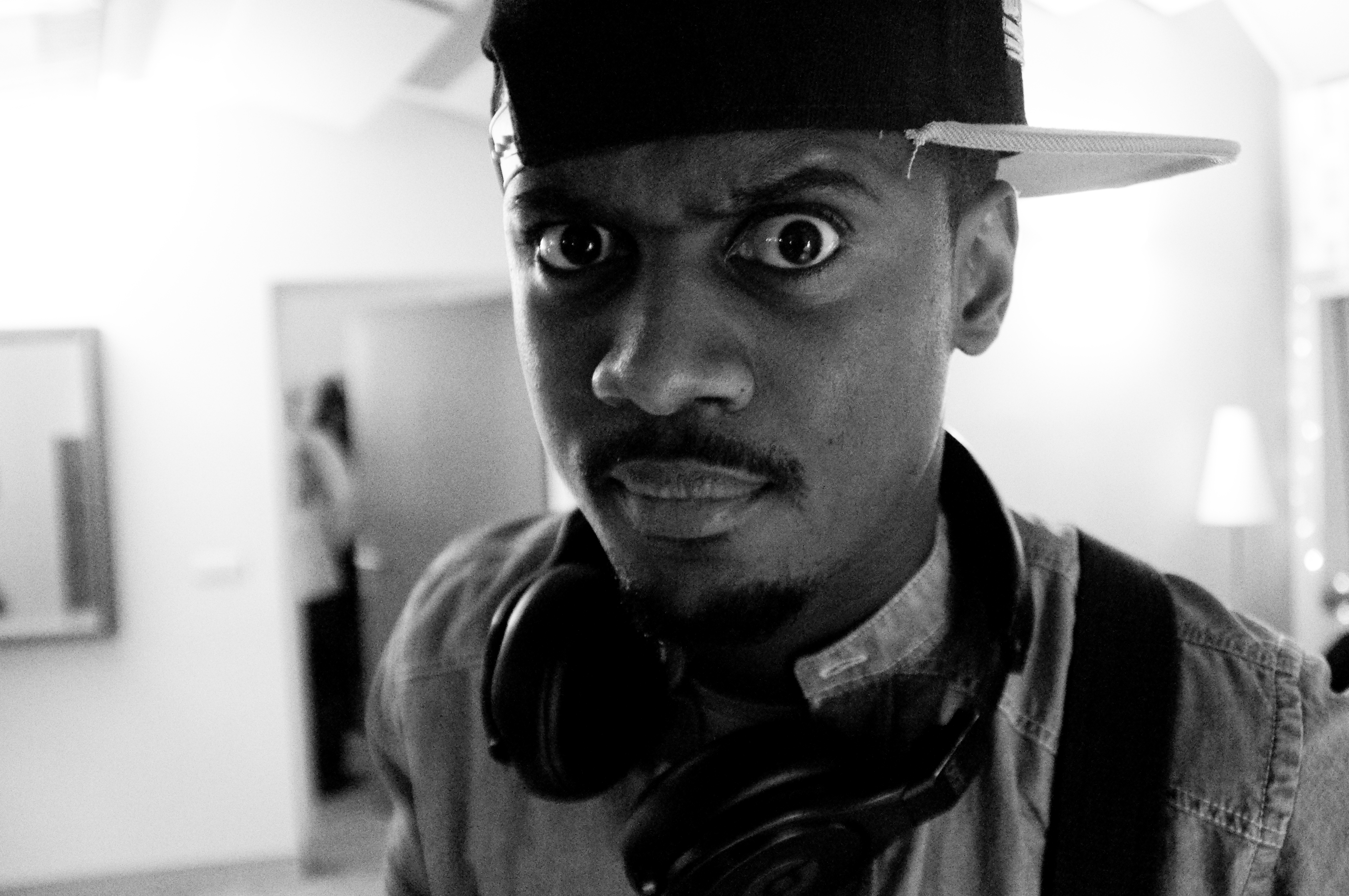
Black M

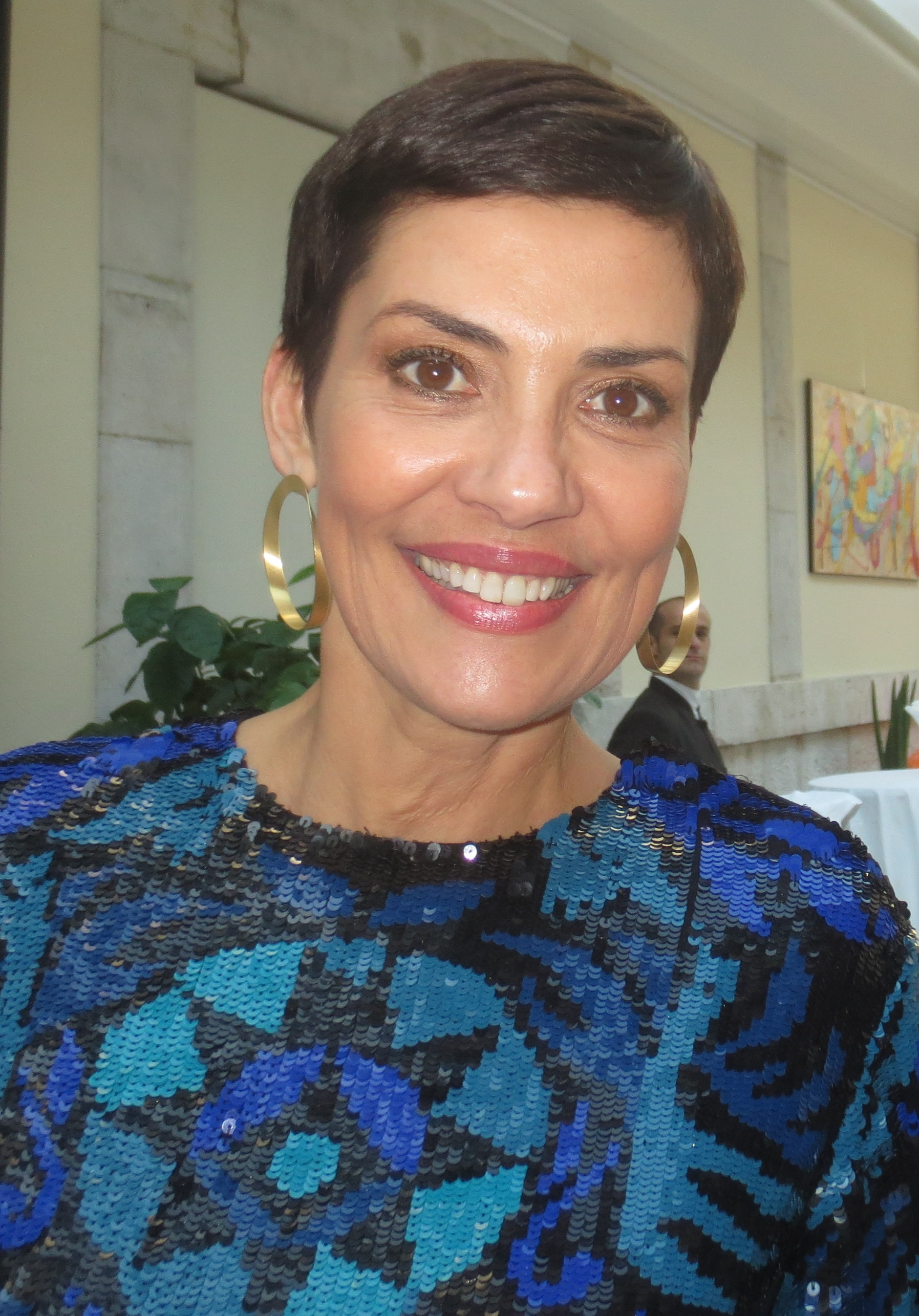
Cristina Córdula

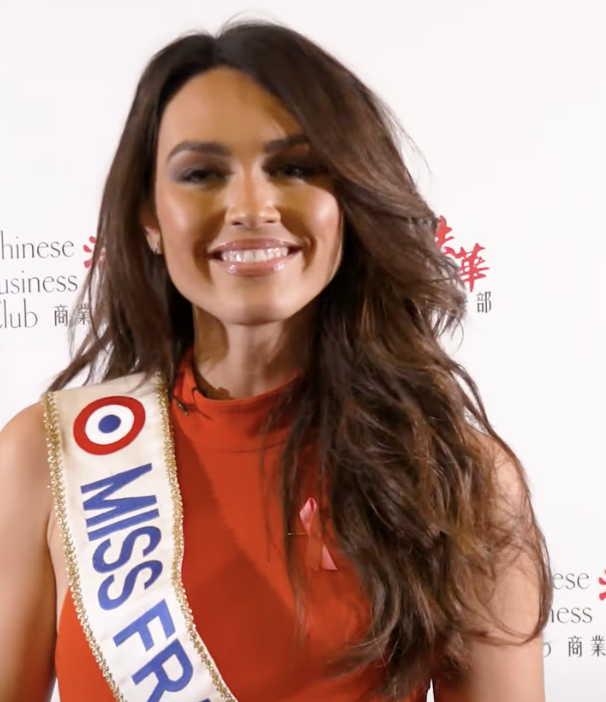
Diane Leyre

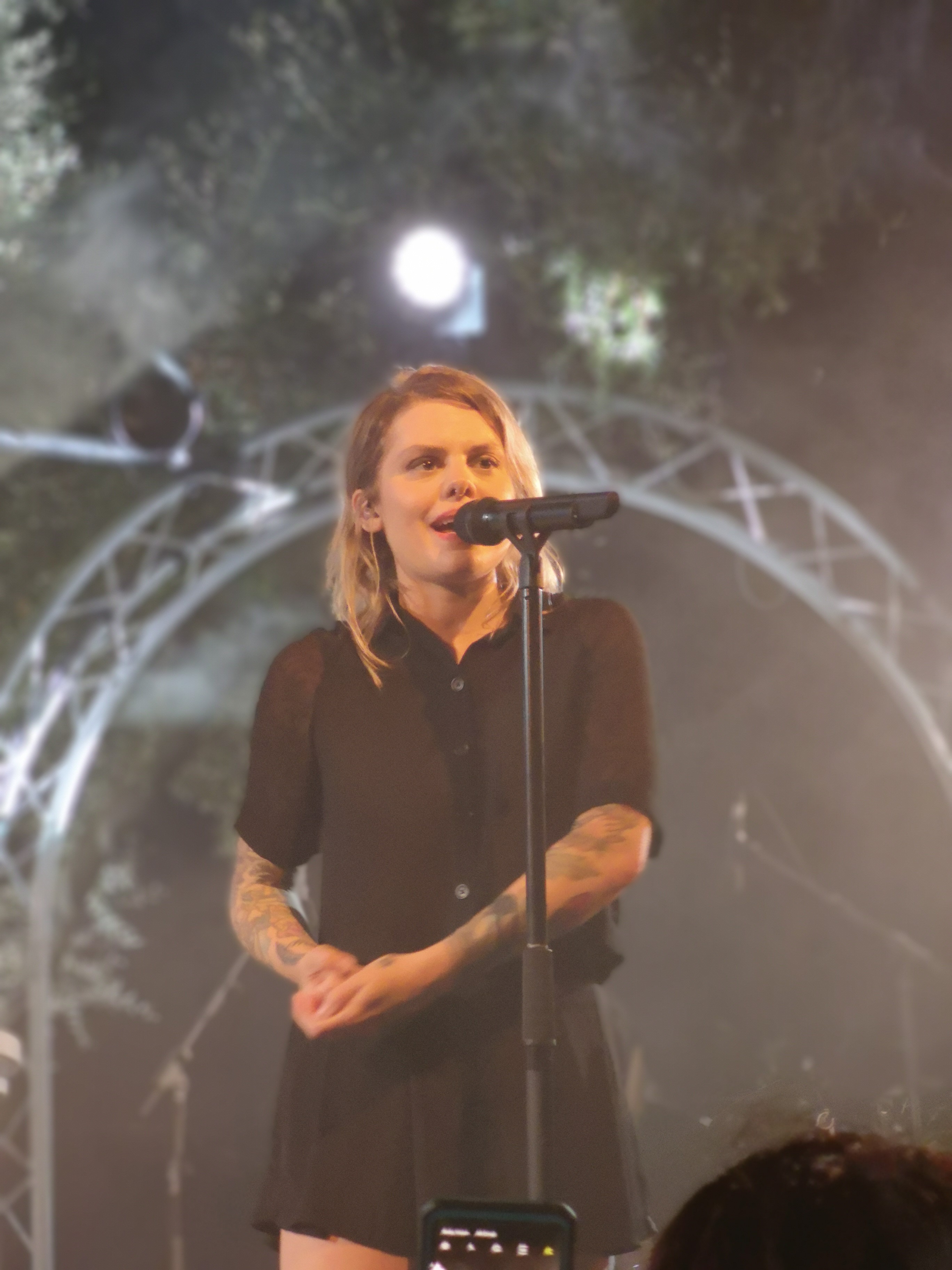
Cœur de pirate

== Scoring ==
| Team | Place | 1 | 2 | 3 | 1/2 + 3 | 4 | 5 | 6 | 7 | 8 | 9 | 10 |
|---|---|---|---|---|---|---|---|---|---|---|---|---|
| Natasha & Anthony | 1 | 29 + 3 = 32 | | 29 | 61 | 24 | 36 | 25 | 22 | 30 | 35 | 34 |
| Nico & Inès | 2 | 28 + 4 = 32 | | 27 | 59 | 30 | 30 | 31 | 22 | 34 | 31 | 36 |
| Inès & Christophe | 3 | 30 + 5 = 35 | | 30 | 65 | 33 | 31 | 35 | 25 | 35 | 37 | 39 |
| Keiona & Maxime | 4 | | 33 + 5 = 38 | 29 | 67 | 32 | 32 | 32 | 24 | 34 | 38 | |
| Roman & Ana | 5 | | 28 + 3 = 31 | 27 | 58 | 24 | 27 | 30 | 22 | 30 | 29 | |
| James & Candice | 6 | | | 21 | 42 | 26 | 26 | 25 | 20 | 26 | | |
| Black M & Elsa | 7 | | 26 + 4 = 30 | 25 | 55 | 22 | 30 | 26 | 17 | 25 | | |
| Adeline & Adrien | 8 | 25 + 0 = 25 | | 29 | 54 | 29 | 28 | 28 | 20 | | | |
| Cristina & Jordan | 9 | 22 | | 28 | 50 | 27 | 26 | 27 | | | | |
| Diane & Yann-Alrick | 10 | | 23 + 0 = 23 | 23 | 46 | 24 | 25 | | | | | |
| Cœur de pirate & Nicolas | 11 | | 19 + 0 = 19 | 21 | 40 | 17 | | | | | | |
| Caroline & Christian | 12 | | 16 | 20 | 36 | | | | | | | |

Red numbers indicate couples with the lowest score for each week.
Blue numbers indicate couples with the highest score for each week.
indicates couples eliminated that week.
indicates the returning couple who finished in the bottom two.
indicates the winning couple.
indicates the runner-up couple.
indicates the third place couple.

=== Notes of each couples ===
| Couple | Total | 10 | 9 | 8 | 7 | 6 | 5 | 4 | 3 | 2 | 1 | Average |
|---|---|---|---|---|---|---|---|---|---|---|---|---|
| Natasha & Anthony | 35 | —N/a | 10 | 9 | 7 | 8 | 1 | —N/a | | | | 7.5 |
| Nico & Inès | 35 | 1 | 4 | 16 | 11 | 3 | —N/a | | | | | 7.7 |
| Inès & Christophe | 35 | 5 | 10 | 16 | 3 | 1 | —N/a | | | | | 8.4 |
| Keiona & Maxime | 31 | 2 | 9 | 13 | 7 | —N/a | | | | | | 8.2 |
| Roman & Ana | 31 | —N/a | | 8 | 15 | 8 | —N/a | | | | | 7.0 |
| James & Candice | 23 | —N/a | | | 11 | 8 | 3 | 1 | —N/a | | | 6.3 |
| Black M & Elsa | 27 | —N/a | | 3 | 9 | 10 | 4 | 1 | —N/a | | | 6.3 |
| Adeline & Adrien | 23 | —N/a | 1 | 4 | 11 | 6 | 1 | —N/a | | | | 6.9 |
| Cristina & Jordan | 20 | —N/a | | 2 | 8 | 8 | 2 | —N/a | | | | 6.5 |
| Diane & Yann-Alrick | 16 | —N/a | | | 1 | 13 | 2 | —N/a | | | | 5.9 |
| Cœur de pirate & Nicolas | 12 | —N/a | | | | 3 | 5 | 2 | 2 | —N/a | | 4.8 |
| Caroline & Christian | 8 | —N/a | | | | 1 | 3 | 3 | 1 | —N/a | | 4.5 |
| Total | 296 | 8 | 34 | 71 | 83 | 69 | 21 | 7 | 3 | 0 | 0 | 7.1 |

== Averages ==
This table only counts dances scored on the traditional 40-point scale.

| Rank by average | Place | Couple | Total | Number of dances | Average |
|---|---|---|---|---|---|
| 1 | 3 | Inès & Christophe | 295 | 9 | 33.71 |
| 2 | 4 | Keiona & Maxime | 254 | 8 | 32.77 |
| 3 | 2 | Nico & Inès | 269 | 9 | 30.74 |
| 4 | 1 | Natasha & Anthony | 264 | 9 | 30.17 |
| 5 | 5 | Roman & Ana | 217 | 8 | 28.00 |
| 6 | 8 | Adeline & Adrien | 159 | 6 | 27.65 |
| 7 | 9 | Cristina & Jordan | 130 | 5 | 26.00 |
| 8 | 7 | Black M & Elsa | 171 | 7 | 25.33 |
| 9 | 6 | James & Candice | 144 | 6 | 25.04 |
| 10 | 10 | Diane & Yann-Alrick | 95 | 4 | 23.75 |
| 11 | 11 | Cœur de pirate & Nicolas | 57 | 3 | 19.00 |
| 12 | 12 | Caroline & Christian | 36 | 2 | 18.00 |

== Highest and lowest scoring performances ==
The best and worst dance performances according to the judges' marks were, out of 40 points:

| Dance | Best dancer | Best score | Worst dancer | Worst score |
|---|---|---|---|---|
| Samba | Inès Reg | 39 | Cristina Córdula | 22 |
| Contemporary Dance | Nico Capone | 36 | Cœur de pirate | 19 |
| Tango | Nico Capone | 31 | Caroline Margeridon | 16 |
| Quickstep | Natasha St-Pier | 34 | Caroline Margeridon | 20 |
| Rumba | Inès Reg | 35 | Cœur de pirate James Denton | 21 |
| Cha-Cha-Cha | Keiona Revlon | 33 | Black M | 22.7 |
| American Smooth | Nico Capone | 30 | Diane Leyre | 24 |
| Bollywood | Inès Reg | 30 | Inès Reg | 30 |
| Waltz | Inès Reg; Natasha St-Pier | 35 | Black M | 22 |
| Foxtrot | Keiona Revlon | 29 | Keiona Revlon | 29 |
| Jazz Broadway | Natasha St-Pier | 24 | Natasha St-Pier | 24 |
| Argentine Tango | Keiona Revlon | 38 | James Denton | 25 |
| Salsa | Inès Reg | 33.3 | James Denton | 26 |
| Paso Doble | Inès Reg | 37 | James Denton | 26 |
| Jive | Keiona Revlon | 32 | Adeline Toniutti | 26.7 |

== Couples' Highest and lowest scoring performances ==
According to the traditional 40-point scale:

| Couples | Highest Scoring Dances | Lowest Scoring Dances |
|---|---|---|
| Natasha & Anthony | Argentine Tango (36) | Jazz Broadway (24) |
| Nico & Inès | Contemporary (36) | Rumba (27) |
| Inès & Christophe | Samba (39) | Contemporary; Bollywood (30) |
| Keiona & Maxime | Argentine Tango (38) | Foxtrot (29) |
| Roman & Ana | Jive; Argentine Tango (30) | Samba (24) |
| James & Candice | American Smooth (26.7) | Rumba / Contemporary Dance (21) |
| Black M & Elsa | Quickstep (30) | Waltz (22) |
| Adeline & Adrien | Contemporary Dance; Quickstep (29) | Tango (25) |
| Cristina & Jordan | American Smooth (28) | Samba (22) |
| Diane & Yann-Alrick | Samba (25) | Rumba; Tango (23) |
| Cœur de pirate & Nicolas | Rumba (21) | Tango (17) |
| Caroline & Christian | Quickstep (20) | Tango (16) |

== Weekly Scores ==
=== Week 1 ===
Individual judges scores in the chart below (given in parentheses) appeared in this order from left to right: Jean-Marc Généreux, Fauve Hautot, Mel Charlot, and Chris Marques.

James Denton & Candice Pascal were supposed to perform in This week but, James got injured and was unable to perform so, they should have performed in week 2.

Running order

| Couple | Score | Style | Music | |
|---|---|---|---|---|
| Cristina & Jordan | 22 (6, 5, 6, 5) | Samba | Crazy in Love - Beyoncé | |
| Inès & Christophe | 30 (8, 7, 8, 7) | Contemporary | Immortelle - Lara Fabian | |
| Adeline & Adrien | 25 (6, 7, 7, 5) | Tango | Mourir demain - Natasha St-Pier ft. Pascal Obispo | |
| Nico & Inès | 28 (7, 7, 7, 7) | Quickstep | Everybody Needs Somebody to Love - Solomon Burke | |
| Natasha & Anthony | 29 (6, 8, 8, 7) | Rumba | Et s'il n'en restait qu'une (je serais celle-là) - Celine Dion | |
Imposed Choreography
| Inès & Christophe | +5 | Cha-Cha-Cha | Houdini - Dua Lipa | 35 |
| Nico & Inès | +4 | Cha-Cha-Cha | Houdini - Dua Lipa | 32 |
| Natasha & Anthony | +3 | Cha-Cha-Cha | Houdini - Dua Lipa | 32 |
| Adeline & Adrien | +0 | Cha-Cha-Cha | Houdini - Dua Lipa | 25 |

=== Week 2 ===
Individual judges scores in the chart below (given in parentheses) appeared in this order from left to right: Jean-Marc Généreux, Fauve Hautot, Mel Charlot, and Chris Marques.

James Denton was still injured and was still unable to perform so, they began the competition at the 3rd week.

Running order

| Couple | Score | Style | Music | |
|---|---|---|---|---|
| Diane & Yann-Alrick | 23 (6,6,6,5) | Rumba | Popcorn Salé - Santa | |
| Caroline & Christian | 16 (4,4,5,3) | Tango | Man! I Feel Like a Woman! - Shania Twain | |
| Black M & Elsa | 26 (5,7,8,6) | Samba | Simple et Funky - Alliance Ethnik | |
| Cœur de pirate & Nicolas | 19 (5,6,5,3) | Contemporary | Le Chemin - Kyo & Sita | |
| James & Candice | N/A | Cha-Cha-Cha | (I've Had) The Time of My Life - Bill Medley ft. Jennifer Warnes | |
| Keiona & Maxime | 33 (8,9,8,8) | Cha-Cha-Cha | Last Dance - Donna Summer | |
| Roman & Ana | 28 (6,8,8,6) | Quickstep | It's Not Unusual - Tom Jones | |
Imposed Choreography
| Keiona & Maxime | +5 | Salsa | Don't Go Yet - Camila Cabello | 38 |
| Black M & Elsa | +4 | Salsa | Don't Go Yet - Camila Cabello | 30 |
| Roman & Ana | +3 | Salsa | Don't Go Yet - Camila Cabello | 31 |
| Diane & Yann-Alrick | +0 | Salsa | Don't Go Yet - Camila Cabello | 23 |
| Cœur de Pirate & Nicolas | +0 | Salsa | Don't Go Yet - Camila Cabello | 19 |

=== Week 3 : Personal Story week ===
Individual judges scores in the chart below (given in parentheses) appeared in this order from left to right: Individual judges scores in the chart below (given in parentheses) appeared in this order from left to right: Jean-Marc Généreux, Fauve Hautot, Mel Charlot, and Chris Marques.

Each couple have their score from week 3 added to the score they got in first 2 weeks.

James who couldn't perform during week 1 & 2 because of an injury had his points doubled to avoid being disadvantaged.

Running order

| Couple | Score | Style | Music | Result |
|---|---|---|---|---|
| Cristina & Jordan | 28 (7,8,7,6) | American Smooth | Tu es mon Autre - Lara Fabian & Maurane | Bottom 2 |
| Inès & Christophe | 30 (8,8,6,8) | Bollywood | DJ - Diam's | Safe |
| Adeline & Adrien | 29 (7,9,7,6) | Contemporary | N’insiste pas - Camille Lellouche | Safe |
| Nico & Inès | 27 (8,6,7,6) | Rumba | La solitudine - Laura Pausini | Safe |
| James & Candice | 21 (6,5,6,4) | Rumba / Contemporary dance | Shallow - Lady Gaga and Bradley Cooper | Safe |
| Natasha & Anthony | 29 (7,7,8,7) | Contemporary | Des milliers de je t'aime - Slimane | Safe |
| Caroline & Christian | 20 (5,5,6,4) | Quickstep | Elle a fait un bébé toute seule - Jean-Jacques Goldman | Eliminated |
| Diane & Yann-Alrick | 23 (6,6,6,5) | Tango | Flower - Miley Cyrus | Safe |
| Roman & Ana | 27 (6,7,7,7) | Waltz | Love Me, Please Love Me - Michel Polnareff | Safe |
| Black M & Elsa | 25 (7,7,7,4) | Tango | Smooth Criminal - Michael Jackson | Safe |
| Cœur de pirate & Nicolas | 21 (6,5,6,4) | Rumba | Corps - Yseult | Safe |
| Keiona & Maxime | 29 (7,8,7,7) | Foxtrot | Rise Like a Phoenix - Conchita Wurst | Immunity |
Face to face
| Cristina & Jordan | 83% | Paso Doble | Color Gitano — Kendji Girac | Safe |
| Caroline & Christian | 17% | Paso Doble | Color Gitano — Kendji Girac | Eliminated |

=== Week 4 : Duels week ===
Individual judges scores in the chart below (given in parentheses) appeared in this order from left to right: Individual judges scores in the chart below (given in parentheses) appeared in this order from left to right: Jean-Marc Généreux, Fauve Hautot, Mel Charlot, and Chris Marques.

The 11 remaining couples are put into 5 duels based on the prime 3 results. So, the 5 duels are:
- Keiona & Maxime VS Inès & Christophe
- Natasha & Anthony VS Nico & Inès
- Roman & Ana VS Black M & Elsa
- Adeline & Adrien & Cristina & Jordan
- Diane & Yann-Alrick VS James & Candice VS Cœur de Pirate & Nicolas

Running order

| Couple | Score | Style | Music | Result |
|---|---|---|---|---|
| Cristina & Jordan | 27 (6,8,7,6) | Tango | Can't Get You Out of My Head – Kylie Minogue | Bottom 6 |
| Adeline & Adrien | 29 (8,7,8,6) | Quickstep | Regarde-moi - Céline Dion | Safe |
| Nico & Inès | 30 (8,7,8,7) | Samba | I Want You Back - Jackson 5 | Safe |
| Natasha & Anthony | 24 (6,6,6,6) | Jazz Broadway | It's Oh So Quiet – Björk | Bottom 6 |
| Inès & Christophe | 33 (9,8,8,8) | Argentine Tango | Versus - Slimane & Vitaa | Safe |
| Keiona & Maxime | 32 (8,9,8,7) | Quickstep | Show Me How You Burlesque - Christina Aguilera | Bottom 6 |
| Roman & Ana | 24 (6,6,6,6) | Samba | On s'attache - Christophe Maé | Safe |
| Black M & Elsa | 22 (6,5,6,5) | Waltz | Ma Vie - Dadju | Bottom 6 |
| Diane & Yann-Alrick | 24 (6,6,6,6) | American Smooth | Hero - Mariah Carey | Bottom 6 |
| Cœur de pirate & Nicolas | 17 (5,4,5,3) | Tango | Divine Idylle - Vanessa Paradis | Bottom 6 |
| James & Candice | 26 (6,7,7,6) | Salsa | (I've Had) The Time of My Life - Bill Medley & Jennifer Warnes | Safe |
Face to face
| Cristina & Jordan | Saved by the jury | Charleston | Les Limites - Julien Doré | |
| Natasha & Anthony | Safe (89%) | Charleston | Les Limites - Julien Doré | |
| Keiona & Maxime | Saved by the jury | Charleston | Les Limites - Julien Doré | |
| Black M & Elsa | Saved by the jury | Charleston | Les Limites - Julien Doré | |
| Diane & Yann-Alrick | Saved by the jury | Charleston | Les Limites - Julien Doré | |
| Cœur de Pirate & Nicolas | Eliminated (11%) | Charleston | Les Limites - Julien Doré | |

=== Week 5 : Cinema and TV series week ===
Individual judges scores in the chart below (given in parentheses) appeared in this order from left to right: Individual judges scores in the chart below (given in parentheses) appeared in this order from left to right: Jean-Marc Généreux, Fauve Hautot, Mel Charlot, and Chris Marques.

The couple who finished first is directly qualified for the week 6 while the couple finishing last is directly sent in face-to-face.

Running order

| Couple | Score | Style | Music | Result |
|---|---|---|---|---|
| Cristina & Jordan | 26 (7,6,7,6) | Rumba | I Will Always Love You - Whitney Houston | Safe |
| Inès & Christophe | 31 (7,8,8,8) | Cha-Cha-Cha | Boogie Wonderland - Earth, Wind & Fire | Safe |
| Adeline & Adrien | 28 (8,7,7,6) | Paso Doble | Bella ciao - Naestro Ft Maître Gims, Slimane, Vitaa & Dadju | Safe |
| Roman & Ana | 27 (6,7,7,7) | Rumba | L'histoire de la Vie - Debbie Davis | Bottom 2 |
| James & Candice | 26 (6,7,7,6) | Waltz | Hold My Hand - Lady Gaga | Safe |
| Nico & Inès | 30 (7,8,8,7) | American Smooth | Love Boat - Jack Jones | Safe |
| Natasha & Anthony | 36 (9,9,9,9) | Argentine Tango | The Addams Family Theme - Vic Mizzy | Immunity |
| Black M & Elsa | 30 (7,8,8,7) | Quickstep | I'll Be There for You - The Rembrandts | Safe |
| Diane & Yann-Alrick | 25 (7,6,6,6) | Samba | Independent Women - Destiny's Child | Eliminated |
| Keiona & Maxime | 32 (9,8,8,7) | Jive | Maniac – Michael Sembello | Safe |
Face to face
| Roman & Ana | 72% | Freestyle | La Carioca - Alain Chabat & Gérard Darmon | Safe |
| Diane & Yann-Alrick | 28% | Freestyle | La Carioca - Alain Chabat & Gérard Darmon | Eliminated |

=== Week 6 : Mystery guest week ===
Individual judges scores in the chart below (given in parentheses) appeared in this order from left to right: Individual judges scores in the chart below (given in parentheses) appeared in this order from left to right: Jean-Marc Généreux, Fauve Hautot, Mel Charlot, and Chris Marques.

Running order

| Couple | Guest(s) | Score | Style | Music | Result |
|---|---|---|---|---|---|
| Cristina & Jordan | Enzo (son of Cristina) | 27 (7,7,7,6) | Quickstep | Candyman - Christina Aguilera | Eliminated |
| Adeline & Adrien | Cécile Chaduteau | 28 (8,6,7,7) | American Smooth | Je Suis Malade - Lara Fabian | Safe |
| Nico & Inès | Stefano (brother of Nico) / Jovica (best friend of Nico) | 31 (8,8,8,7) | Cha-cha-cha | I Wanna Dance with Somebody (Who Loves Me) - Whitney Houston | Safe |
| James & Candice | Romain (cousin of Candice) | 25 (6,7,7,5) | Argentine Tango | Allumer le feu - Brigitte | Bottom 2 |
| Inès & Christophe | Michaël (best friend of Inès) | 35 (9,9,9,8) | Rumba / Contemporary | Si je m'en sors - Julie Zenatti | Immunity |
| Natasha & Anthony | Laurence (mother of Anthony) | 25 (6,5,7,7) | Cha-cha-cha | Girls Just Want to Have Fun - Cyndi Lauper | Safe |
| Black M & Elsa | Léa Djadja | 26 (7,6,7,6) | Rumba | In The Star - Benson Boone & Philippine Lavrey | Safe |
| Roman & Ana | Charlotte Guerrin (friend of Roman) | 30 (8,8,7,7) | Jive | You're the One That I Want – Olivia Newton-John & John Travolta | Safe |
| Keiona & Maxime | Moon / Ginger Bitch / Vespi & Mami Watta (friends of Keiona) | 32 (8,9,7,8) | Contemporary | Comme ils disent - Lara Fabian | Safe |
Face to face
| James & Candice | | 60% | Freestyle | Pump Up The Jam - Technotronic | Safe |
| Cristina & Jordan | | 40% | Freestyle | Pump Up The Jam - Technotronic | Eliminated |

=== Week 7 : Battle of the judges week ===
Individual judges scores in the chart below (given in parentheses) appeared in this order from left to right: Individual judges scores in the chart below (given in parentheses) appeared in this order from left to right: Jean-Marc Généreux, Fauve Hautot, Mel Charlot, and Chris Marques.

Each couples dance in trio with one of the judge.

Running order

| Couple | Judge | Score | Style | Music | Result |
|---|---|---|---|---|---|
| Adeline & Adrien | Jean-Marc Généreux | 20 (X,7,7,6) | Jive | Proud Mary - Glee | Eliminated |
| Inès & Christophe | Mel Charlot | 25 (8,9,X,8) | Salsa | Waka Waka (This Time for Africa) - Ndlovu Youth Choir | Safe |
| Nico & Inès | Chris Marques | 22 (6,8,8,X) | Paso Doble | La Goffa Lolita - La petite culotte | Immunity |
| James & Candice | Fauve Hautot | 20 (6,X,7,7) | American Smooth | J'te l'dis quand même - Patrick Bruel | Safe |
| Roman & Ana | Chris Marques | 22 (7,7,8,X) | Contemporary | Ceux qu'on était - Pierre Garnier | Immunity |
| Black M & Elsa | Mel Charlot | 17 (5,6,X,6) | Cha-cha-cha | Uptown Funk - Mark Ronson Ft Bruno Mars | Safe |
| Natasha & Anthony | Jean-Marc Généreux | 22 (X,8,8,6) | American Smooth | Sous Le Vent by Garou & Céline Dion | Bottom 3 |
| Keiona & Maxime | Fauve Hautot | 24 (8,X,8,8) | Paso Doble | Cry Me A River - Tommee Profitt & Nicole Serrano | Bottom 3 |
Face to face
| Natasha & Anthony | | 52% | Freestyle | I Follow Rivers - Lykke Li | Safe |
| Keiona & Maxime | | 31% | Freestyle | I Follow Rivers - Lykke Li | Safe |
| Adeline & Adrien | | 17% | Freestyle | I Follow Rivers - Lykke Li | Eliminated |

=== Week 8 : Quarterfinals ===
Individual judges scores in the chart below (given in parentheses) appeared in this order from left to right: Individual judges scores in the chart below (given in parentheses) appeared in this order from left to right: Jean-Marc Généreux, Fauve Hautot, Mel Charlot, and Chris Marques.

Running order

| Couple | Score | Style | Music | Result |
|---|---|---|---|---|
| Natasha & Anthony | 30 (8,8,8,6) | Paso Doble | Like a Prayer - Madonna | Safe |
| Inès & Christophe | 35 (8,10,9,8) | Waltz | Voilà - Barbara Pravi | Immunity |
| Nico & Inès | 34 (8,8,10,8) | Waltz | Hedwig's Theme from Harry Potter | Bottom 3 |
| Keiona & Maxime | 34 (9,9,9,7) | Samba | Déjà Vu - Beyoncé ft. Jay-Z | Safe |
| James & Candice | 26 (7,7,7,5) | Paso Doble | James Bond Theme – Monty Norman (from James Bond) | Eliminated |
| Black M & Elsa | 25 (6,6,7,6) | American Smooth | Pas là - Vianney | Eliminated |
| Roman & Ana | 30 (8,8,7,7) | Argentine Tango | Comic Strip - Serge Gainsbourg ft. Brigitte Bardot | Safe |
Face to face
| Nico & Inès | 53% | Freestyle | Who Do You Think You Are - Spice Girls | Safe |
| Black M & Elsa | 16% | Freestyle | Who Do You Think You Are - Spice Girls | Eliminated |
| James & Candice | 31% | Freestyle | Who Do You Think You Are - Spice Girls | Eliminated |

=== Week 9 : Semi-Final ===
Individual judges scores in the chart below (given in parentheses) appeared in this order from left to right: Individual judges scores in the chart below (given in parentheses) appeared in this order from left to right: Jean-Marc Généreux, Fauve Hautot, Mel Charlot, and Chris Marques.

In the first round, the couple that got the lowest score from the judges is directly eliminated.

On the second dance, each couple will discover their routine, the music, the costumes, the scenography approximatively 1mn45 before the dance. This improvised dance isn't noted by the judges.

Running order

| Couple | Score | Style | Music | Result |
|---|---|---|---|---|
| Inès & Christophe | 37 (9,9,10,9) | Paso Doble | O Fortuna - Carl Orff | Safe |
| Inès & Christophe | N/A | Argentine Tango | Dernière Danse - Indila | Safe |
| Natasha & Anthony | 35 (9,9,9,8) | Waltz | Mistral gagnant - Renaud | Safe |
| Natasha & Anthony | N/A | Rumba | You Are So Beautiful - Joe Cocker | Safe |
| Nico & Inès | 31 (8,8,8,7) | Tango | Oh, Pretty Woman – Roy Orbison | Safe |
| Nico & Inès | N/A | Samba | Je danse le Mia - IAM | Safe |
| Keiona & Maxime | 38 (9,10,10,9) | Argentine Tango | Désenchantée - Mylène Farmer | Eliminated |
| Keiona & Maxime | N/A | Cha-Cha-Cha | Vogue - Madonna | Eliminated |
| Roman & Ana | 29 (7,7,8,7) | Cha-cha-cha | Dynamite - BTS | Eliminated |
| Roman & Ana | N/A | N/A | N/A | Eliminated |

=== Week 10 : Final ===
Individual judges scores in the chart below (given in parentheses) appeared in this order from left to right: Individual judges scores in the chart below (given in parentheses) appeared in this order from left to right: Jean-Marc Généreux, Fauve Hautot, Mel Charlot, and Chris Marques.

Inès & Christophe got eliminated before doing their 2nd routine.

For the last dance, they would have redone the Rumba/Contemporary of 6th week.

Running order

| Couple | Score | Style | Music | Result |
|---|---|---|---|---|
| Natasha & Anthony | 34 (9,9,9,7) | Quickstep | Help! - Bananarama & Lananeeneenoonoo | Winner |
| Natasha & Anthony | N/A | Freestyle | All by Myself – Céline Dion | Winner |
| Inès & Christophe | 39 (10,10,9,10) | Samba | Single Ladies (Put A Ring On It) - Beyoncé | 3rd place |
| Inès & Christophe | Wasn't Performed | Freestyle | Unstoppable - Sia | 3rd place |
| Nico & Inès | 36 (9,9,9,9) | Contemporary | Ma Gueule - Johnny Hallyday | 2nd place |
| Nico & Inès | N/A | Freestyle | Can't Stop The Feeling - Justin Timberlake | 2nd place |
The Last Dance
| Natasha & Anthony | 57% | Argentine Tango | The Addams Family Theme - Vic Mizzy | |
| Nico & Inès | 43% | Paso Doble | La Goffa Lolita - La petite culotte | |

== Dance Chart ==
| Couple | 1 | | 2 | | 3 | 4 | 5 | 6 | 7 | 8 | 9 | | 10 | | |
|---|---|---|---|---|---|---|---|---|---|---|---|---|---|---|---|
| Natasha & Anthony | Rumba | Cha-cha-cha | - | - | Contemporary | Jazz Broadway | Argentine Tango | Cha-Cha-Cha | American Smooth | Paso Doble | Waltz | Rumba | Quickstep | Freestyle | Argentine Tango |
| Nico & Inès | Quickstep | Cha-cha-cha | - | - | Rumba | Samba | American Smooth | Cha-Cha-Cha | Paso Doble | Waltz | Tango | Samba | Contemporary | Freestyle | Paso Doble |
| Inès & Christophe | Contemporary | Cha-cha-cha | - | - | Bollywood | Argentine Tango | Cha-Cha-Cha | Rumba / Contemporary | Salsa | Waltz | Paso Doble | Argentine Tango | Samba | | |
| Keiona & Maxime | - | - | Cha-cha-cha | Salsa | Foxtrot | Quickstep | Jive | Contemporary | Paso Doble | Samba | Argentine Tango | Cha-cha-cha | | | |
| Roman & Ana | - | - | Quickstep | Salsa | Waltz | Samba | Rumba | Jive | Contemporary | Argentine Tango | Cha-cha-cha | | | | |
| James & Candice | - | - | - | - | Rumba / Contemporary dance | Salsa | Waltz | Argentine Tango | American Smooth | Paso Doble | | | | | |
| Black M & Elsa | - | - | Samba | Salsa | Tango | Waltz | Quickstep | Rumba | Cha-Cha-Cha | American Smooth | | | | | |
| Adeline & Adrien | Tango | Cha-cha-cha | - | - | Contemporary | Quickstep | Paso Doble | American Smooth | Jive | | | | | | |
| Cristina & Jordan | Samba | - | - | - | American Smooth | Tango | Rumba | Quickstep | | | | | | | |
| Diane & Yann-Alrick | - | - | Rumba | Salsa | Tango | American Smooth | Samba | | | | | | | | |
| Cœur de pirate & Nicolas | - | - | Contemporary | Salsa | Rumba | Tango | | | | | | | | | |
| Caroline & Christian | - | - | Tango | - | Quickstep | | | | | | | | | | |

Highest scoring dance
Lowest scoring dance
Danced, but not scored
