= Chloé Deher =

French beauty pageant titleholder

- Born: Terre-de-Haut, Guadeloupe, France
- Height: 177 cm (5 ft 10 in)
- Beauty pageant titleholder
- Title: Miss Guadeloupe 2013; Miss Universe Guadeloupe 2026
- Major competitions: Miss France 2014; (4th Runner-Up); Miss Universe Guadeloupe 2026; (Winner); Miss Universe 2026; (TBD)

Chloé Deher is a French beauty pageant titleholder who won Miss Guadeloupe 2013. She will represent Guadeloupe at Miss Universe 2026.

== Early life and education ==
Chloé Deher is originally from the Îles des Saintes. She is the daughter of Willy Deher and Annie Maisonneuve and completed her high school education.

== Pageantry ==
Deher won Miss Guadeloupe 2013 and represented Guadeloupe at Miss France 2014, and was fourth runner-up. She was selected as Miss Universe Guadeloupe 2026 by the Miss International Guadeloupe committee. Deher will represent Guadeloupe at Miss Universe 2026, scheduled to be held in November 2026 in San Juan, Puerto Rico.

Awards and achievements
Preceded by Ophély Mézino	Miss Universe Guadeloupe; 2026	Incumbent
Preceded by Cynthia Tinédor	Miss Guadeloupe; 2013	Succeeded by Chloé Mozar
