= Gillie (disambiguation) =

A gillie or ghillie is an assistant who attends to a person who is hunting or fishing in Scotland.

Ghillie or gillie may also refer to:

- Ghillie brogues, a type of brogue shoe
- Ghillie kettle, a type of portable water boiler
- Ghillie suit, a camouflage outfit
- Ghillie shirt, a traditional Scottish style of shirt
- Ghillie Dhu, a Scottish faerie
- Ghillies (dance shoes), shoes used in Irish and Scottish dancing

== People ==
- Annis Gillie (1900–1985), British physician
- Cecilia Gillie (1907–1996), English radio executive
- Elizabeth Gillie (1911–2009), American politician
- Farrand Gillie (1905–1972), Canadian professional ice hockey player
- George W. Gillie (1880–1963), U.S. congressman from Indiana
- Ghillie Basan (born 1962), Scottish food and travel writer
- Gillie Alldis (1920–1998), football wing half
- Gillie Larew (1882–1977), American mathematician
- Gillie Potter (1887–1975), English comedian and broadcaster
- Gillie Schattner (born 1965), of Australian sculptors Gillie and Marc
- Gillie Wilson (1869–1952), Australian cricketer
- Jean Gillie (1915–1949), English film actress
- Oliver Gillie (1937–2021), British journalist

== Other uses ==
- Gillie Hampton, a character in the BBC soap opera EastEnders
- Sheriff v. Gillie, a U.S. Supreme Court case about debt collection practices

== See also ==
- Gille (disambiguation)
- Gilli (disambiguation)
- Gillies, a Scottish surname
- Jilly, a given name
