= Indira Ampiot =

French beauty pageant titleholder

- Ampiot in 2025
- Born: 19 September 2004 (age 22); Basse-Terre, Guadeloupe, France
- Height: 1.77 m (5 ft 10 in)
- Beauty pageant titleholder
- Title: Miss Basse-Terre 2022; Miss Guadeloupe 2022; Miss France 2023
- Major competitions: Miss France 2023; (Winner); Miss Universe 2024; (Top 30); Miss World 2026; (Top 12)

Indira Ampiot (born 19 September 2004) is a French beauty pageant titleholder who won Miss France 2023, Miss Guadeloupe 2022 and Miss Basse-Terre 2022. She is the fourth woman from Guadeloupe to win Miss France. She represented France at both Miss Universe 2024 and Miss World 2026.

== Early life and education ==
Indira Ampiot was born in Basse-Terre, in the overseas region of Guadeloupe, on 19 September 2004, to parents Didier Ampiot and Béatrice Téjou. Her father owns a communications and marketing agency, while her mother works in the social security sector. Téjou had previously won Miss Basse-Terre 1998 and was first runner-up at Miss Guadeloupe 1998. Ampiot is the niece of footballer Frédéric Tejou. Ampiot has an elder brother, and her parents are divorced.

Ampiot graduated with her baccalauréat with honors in 2022, and had planned to pursue post-secondary education studying communication in Paris, with the goal of specializing in visual advertising, communication, and design, prior to becoming Miss France.

== Pageantry ==
=== Miss Guadeloupe 2022 ===
Ampiot's first pageant was Miss Basse-Terre 2022, which she won in January 2022. This qualified her to compete in Miss Guadeloupe 2022. Ampiot won Miss Guadeloupe 2022 in July 2022. Ampiot later crowned Jalylane Maës as her successor at Miss Guadeloupe 2023 on 19 July 2023.

=== Miss France 2023 ===
Ampiot represented Guadeloupe and won Miss France 2023, on held on 17 December 2022 in Châteauroux. Prior to the start of the competition, Ampiot had already emerged as one of the frontrunners to win according to the French media. She was crowned by outgoing titleholder Diane Leyre of Île-de-France, becoming the fourth woman from Guadeloupe to win the title. Ampiot received the maximum score from both the jury and the French public in both the top fifteen and the top five.

Ampiot was awarded a number of prizes and rewards, including gifts from sponsors, a year-long residence in a luxury Paris apartment, and an undisclosed monthly salary the equivalent of a senior executive in France. Ampiot completed her reign on 16 December 2023, when she crowned Eve Gilles as her successor at Miss France 2024.

In November 2023, Ampiot confirmed that she would represent France at Miss Universe 2024, where she finished in the top 30.

In May 2026, it was announced that Ampiot would represent France at Miss World 2026, where later placed in the top 12. She had qualified to the initial top 40 after winning the Top Model Challenge for Europe, and later advanced into the top 20 as the overall Top Model Challenge winner.

== Personal life ==
In 2024, she was in a relationship with French footballer Mathys Tel.

Awards and achievements
Preceded by Diane Leyre	Miss France; 2023	Succeeded by Eve Gilles
Preceded by Agathe Cauet	Miss World France; 2026	Incumbent
Preceded by Diane Leyre	Miss Universe France; 2024	Succeeded by Eve Gilles
Preceded by Ludivine Edmond	Miss Guadeloupe; 2022	Succeeded by Jalylane Maës
Preceded by Brittanie Brudey	Miss Basse-Terre; 2022	Incumbent
