= Eve Gilles =

French beauty pageant titleholder

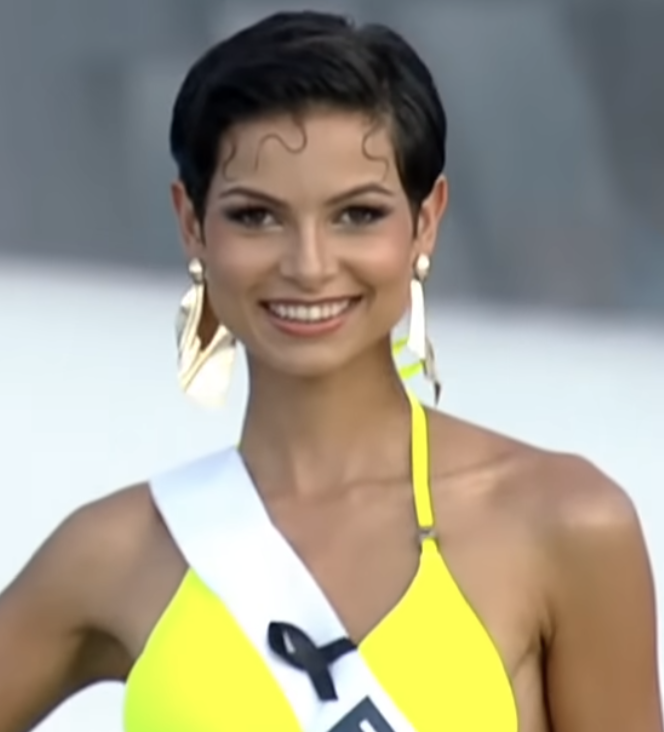
- Gilles at Miss Universe 2025
- Born: 9 July 2003 (age 23); Dunkirk, France
- Education: University of Lille
- Height: 1.71 m (5 ft 7 in)
- Beauty pageant titleholder
- Title: Miss Hersin-Coupigny 2023; Miss Nord-Pas-de-Calais 2023; Miss France 2024
- Major competitions: Miss France 2024; (Winner); Miss Universe 2025; (Top 30); Miss Supranational 2026; (1st Runner-Up)

Eve Gilles (born 9 July 2003) is a French beauty pageant titleholder who won Miss France 2024. She had previously won Miss Nord-Pas-de-Calais 2023 and is the fourth woman from Nord-Pas-de-Calais to win Miss France. Due to her pixie cut, Gilles was also cited by the French media as the first woman with short hair to win Miss France.

== Early life and education ==
Gilles was born on 9 July 2003 in Dunkirk to parents Bruno and Édith Gilles (née Calapin-Latchoumy), and was raised in the nearby town of Quaëdypre in the Nord department. Her father is a French land surveyor, while her mother works as his secretary and comes from the town of Sainte-Marie in Réunion. Gilles has two sisters. In her youth, Gilles was active in a variety of activities, such as dance, athletics, and equitation, and had been elected as a class representative throughout her education. At age 14, Gilles was diagnosed with the neurological condition paroxysmal dyskinesia, and she did not publicly reveal her diagnosis until October 2024. Gilles was educated at Lycée Jean-Bart in Dunkirk, where she aspired to become a neurologist and graduated with her baccalauréat with mention très bien honors in 2021.

Prior to becoming Miss France, Gilles was a student at the University of Lille, studying mathematics and computer science with the career aspiration of becoming a statistician. She had previously completed one semester of medical studies, but did not return after deciding that she no longer wished to pursue the medical field. After ending her medical studies, Gilles spent one semester working at an egg factory in Wormhout, before returning to school as a mathematics and computer science student.

== Pageantry ==
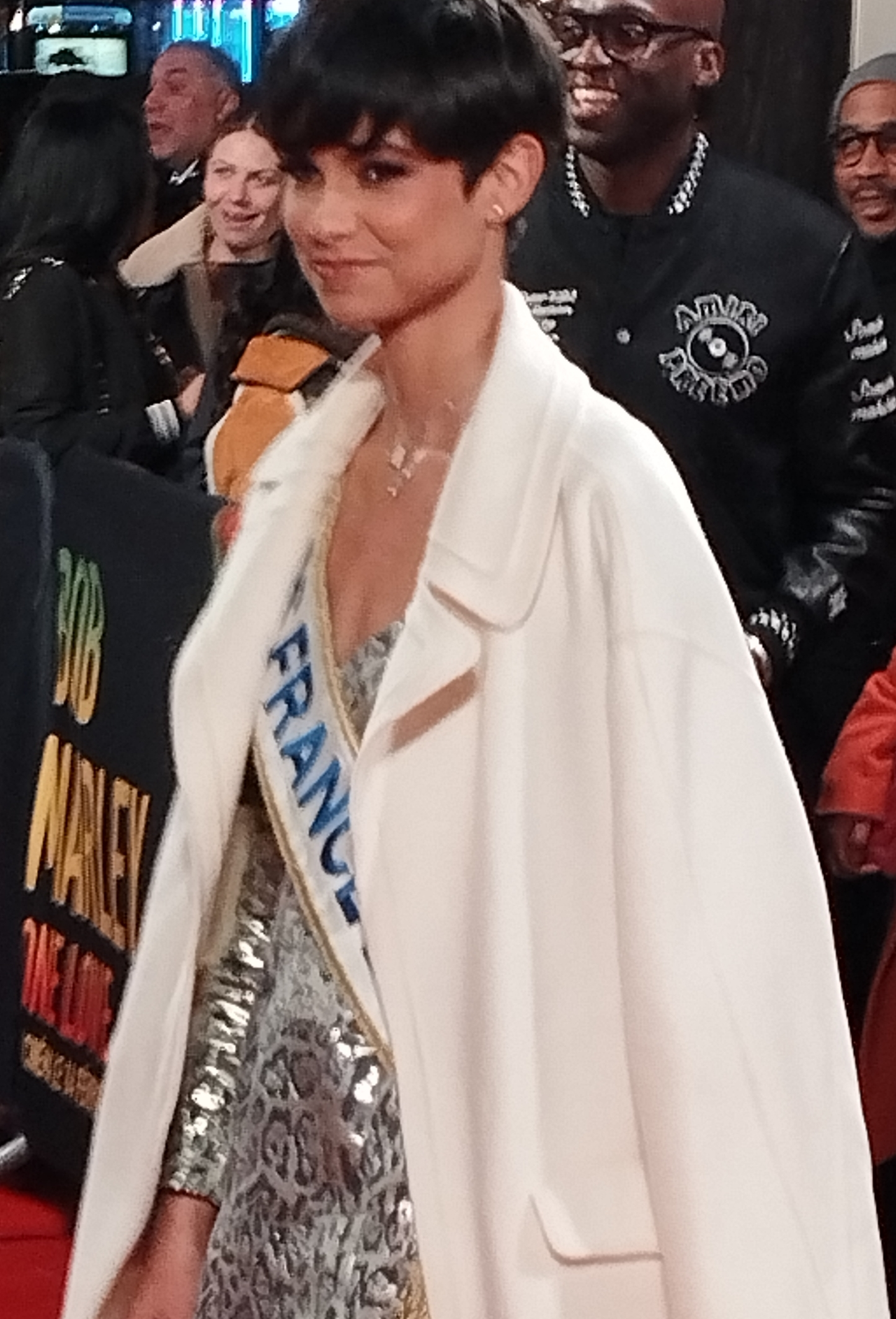
Gilles in 2024

=== Miss Nord-Pas-de-Calais 2023 ===
Gilles's first pageant was the local Miss Hersin-Coupigny 2023 pageant. She had aspired to become Miss France since her childhood, but was encouraged by her maternal grandfather to finally sign up to compete in a qualifying pageant.

At her first registration, she failed to meet the height requirement of 1.70 m (5 ft 7 in), as she was 1.695 m (5 ft 6 1/2 in). She later reached the requirement through stretching. The final was held in April 2023, which Gilles went on to win. As Miss Hersin-Coupigny 2023, Gilles qualified to compete in Miss Nord-Pas-de-Calais 2023.

Gilles won Miss Nord-Pas-de-Calais 2023 in October 2023 at the Arena Stade Couvert de Liévin in Liévin. She crowned her successor Sabah Aïb at Miss Nord-Pas-de-Calais 2024 in October 2024.

=== Miss France 2024 ===
Gilles represented Nord-Pas-de-Calais and won Miss France 2024, on 16 December 2023 at the Zénith de Dijon. She was crowned by outgoing titleholder Indira Ampiot of Guadeloupe, becoming the fourth woman from Nord-Pas-de-Calais to win the title. After the competition, Gilles was the victim of cyberbullying about her physical appearance, receiving negative comments about her hairstyle and body type. Gilles was defended by a number of French public figures, including politicians Sandrine Rousseau and Karima Delli. As Miss France, Gilles received gifts from sponsors, a year-long residence in a luxury Paris apartment, and an undisclosed monthly salary the equivalent of a senior executive in France.

Gilles appeared at a variety of events both in France and internationally. She was a guest in season 11 of Star Academy, 2024 Series Mania, the 2024 Cannes Film Festival, the 2024 French Open, and the 2024 Monte-Carlo Television Festival. Gilles also modeled in Barcelona as the face of Festina and walked for Pierre Cardin at Paris Fashion Week. In December 2023, it was announced that Gilles would participate in the 2024 Summer Olympics torch relay, appearing in July 2024 in Lille. In March 2024, Gabriel Attal appointed Gilles as an ambassador of the French government for mathematics, to promote further education and careers in mathematics for young girls in honor of the International Day of Mathematics.

Gilles represented France at Miss Universe 2025, and finished in the top 30. Gilles represented France at Miss Supranational 2026, where she finished as the first runner-up and won the Miss Photogenic award.

== Post-pageantry ==
In December 2024, Gilles was announced as a celebrity contestant in Danse avec les stars season 14. In February 2025, it was announced that Gilles would be partnered with professional dancer Nino Mosa for the competition. Gilles and Mosa finished in eighth place and were eliminated in the seventh episode.

Awards and achievements
Preceded by (Germany) Anna Lakrini	Miss Supranational 1st Runner-Up; 2026	Incumbent
Preceded by Valentine Le Corre	Miss Supranational France; 2026	Incumbent
Preceded by Indira Ampiot	Miss Universe France; 2025	Succeeded by Garance Authié
Preceded by Indira Ampiot	Miss France; 2024	Succeeded by Angélique Angarni-Filopon
Preceded by Agathe Cauet	Miss Nord-Pas-de-Calais; 2023	Succeeded by Sabah Aïb
Preceded by Justine Delcroix	Miss Hersin-Coupigny; 2023	Succeeded by Maëlys Brochet
