= Gillies =

Gillies is both a Scottish surname and a given name shared by several notable people:

== Surname uses ==
=== Politicians ===
- Duncan Gillies (1834–1903), Australian colonial and state politician
- James McPhail Gillies (1924–2015), Canadian national politician
- John Gillies (Canadian politician) (1837–1889), Scottish-Canadian state and national politician
- Joseph Alexander Gillies (1849–1921), Canadian state and national politician
- Phil Gillies (born 1954), English-Canadian state politician
- Thomas Gillies (1828–1889), New Zealand provincial and national politician
- William Gillies (1865–1932), Scottish patriot, socialist and politician
- William Gillies (Australian politician) (1868–1928), Australian state politician

=== Sportspeople ===
- Clark Gillies (1954–2022), Canadian professional ice hockey player, member of the Hockey Hall of Fame
- Colton Gillies (born 1989), Canadian amateur ice hockey player
- Craig Gillies (born 1976), English rugby union player
- Eric Gillies (born 1952), Canadian Olympic ice dancer
- John Gillies (1918–1991), Scottish footballer
- Matt Gillies (1921–1998), Scottish footballer
- Shawn Gillies (born 1981), Jamaican-Australian cricketer
- Simon Gillies (born before 1987), Australian rugby league player
- Trevor Gillies (born 1979), Canadian professional ice hockey player

=== Others ===
- Anne Lorne Gillies (born 1944), Scottish singer-songwriter, broadcaster, academic and writer
- Annemarie Gillies, New Zealand professor of Māori research
- Ben Gillies (born 1979), Australian musician
- Betty Gillies (1909–1998), American aviator
- Bom Gillies (1925–2024), New Zealand soldier
- Daniel Gillies (born 1976), Canadian-New Zealand actor
- Donald A. Gillies, British philosopher and historian of science and mathematics
- Donald B. Gillies (1928–1975), Canadian mathematician and computer scientist
- Elizabeth Gillies (born 1993), American actress
- Ewen Gillies (1825-?), serial emigrant from St. Kilda, Scotland
- Fiona Gillies (born before 1980), British actress
- Harold Gillies (1882–1960), New Zealand-English physician, "father of plastic surgery"
- Ian Gillies (before 1944–2002), British quiz show champion
- Isabel Gillies (born 1970), American actress
- John Gillies (anaesthetist) (1895–1976) Scottish anaesthetist
- John Gillies (botanist) (1792–1834), Scottish naval surgeon who later became an explorer and botanist
- John Gillies (minister) (1712–1796), a Church of Scotland minister and theological writer
- John Gillies (historian) (1747–1836), Scottish historian and classical scholar
- Kylie Gillies (born 1967), Australian television personality
- Liz Gillies, from VICTORiOUS
- Marshall Macdonald Gillies (1901–1976), British classical scholar
- Max Gillies (born 1941), Australian actor
- Michael Thomas Gillies (1920–1999), English medical entomologist
- Midge Gillies (born 1962), British journalist and biographer
- Pamela Gillies (born 1953), Scottish academic
- Robert Gillies (disambiguation)
- Rowan Gillies (born 1971), Australian physician, former president of Médecins Sans Frontières
- Stuart Gillies (born before 1987), English chef
- Stuart Gillies (born 1986), Composer of "The Longest Reign" music written for Queen Elizabeth the second
- William George Gillies (1898–1973), Scottish painter
- William S. Gillies (1911–2000), American artist

== Places ==
- Gillies, Ontario, Canada

== See also ==
- "Gillies" in an instrumental song by Wolfstone from The Half Tail
- Gilles (surname)
- Gillis (surname)
- Gilliss
- Gillie (disambiguation)
