= Antoine Gilis =

French musician and composer

Antoine Gilis (6 April 1847 – 8 March 1914) was a Belgian musician and composer who composed mainly for the piano and violin. He believed that "above all, the student who starts out learning the piano, should have fun.". To accomplish this, his study pieces are very melodic and increase slowly in difficulty throughout the books as to "stimulate interest". Throughout his books, study pieces are accompanied by easy explanations of music theory.

Several books were published by A. Hammond & Co and Schott & Co around 1910, such as his famous "Méthode de Piano".

== List of famous pieces ==
- La Jeune Fanfare. Marche facile pour Piano
- Fantaisie Joyeuse. Op. 456. (Violin and Piano)
- Chant d'Adieu. Op. 459. (Violin and Piano)
- Doux Souvenir. Morceau sentimental pour Piano
- Fantaisie Pastorale. Op. 458. (Violin and Piano)
- Fantaisie Mignonne. Op. 457. (Violin and Piano)
- Fantaisie pour Piano sur le Voyage en Chine [by F. E. J. Bazin]
- L'Écho du Soir, morceau de salon pour Piano
- Le Jeune Violoniste. 6 Morceaux tre
