= Gillis Range =

Mountain range in Nevada, United States

- Location within Nevada

Highest point
- Elevation: 2,308 m (7,572 ft)

Geography
- Country: United States
- State: Nevada
- District: Mineral County
- Range coordinates: 38°41′21.710″N 118°33′34.478″W
- Topo map: USGS Ryan Canyon

The Gillis Range is a mountain range in Mineral County, Nevada.
