= Gillis family =

The Gillis family was an American family of eight who traveled the world in a covered wagon in the 1960s. The family consisted of father Leon Gillis (1920–2010), mother Iyone Gillis (1923–2015), and their six children: Lee Ann, Janet, Susie, Barbara, Allen, and George.

In 1961–62, starting from their home in Virginia, Leon led the family on a coast-to-coast covered wagon journey, in the "Last Wagon West." In 1963–64, the Gillis family took their wagon to Europe, traveling from France, to a Dutch visit with Freddy Heineken, through Minsk to Moscow, living by dint of their wits and the generosity of strangers. These journeys were covered in various local media as well as Newsweek, Life magazine, Soviet Life, the Nieuwe Rotterdamsche Courant, and on network television from prime time news to The Ed Sullivan Show, the Today Show, and the television program To Tell the Truth, and Soviet film Beloved (Любимая).
