= Gilly Szego =

- Born: Gillian M Roscow; 4 September 1932; Elham, Kent, England
- Died: 20 March 2023 (aged 90); Hertfordshire, England
- Other name: Gilly Seago
- Occupation: Artist
- Years active: 1952–2023
- Spouse: Holwell Bender (1951–1956) John Szego (1957–2013)
- Relatives: Pamela Roscow (sister)

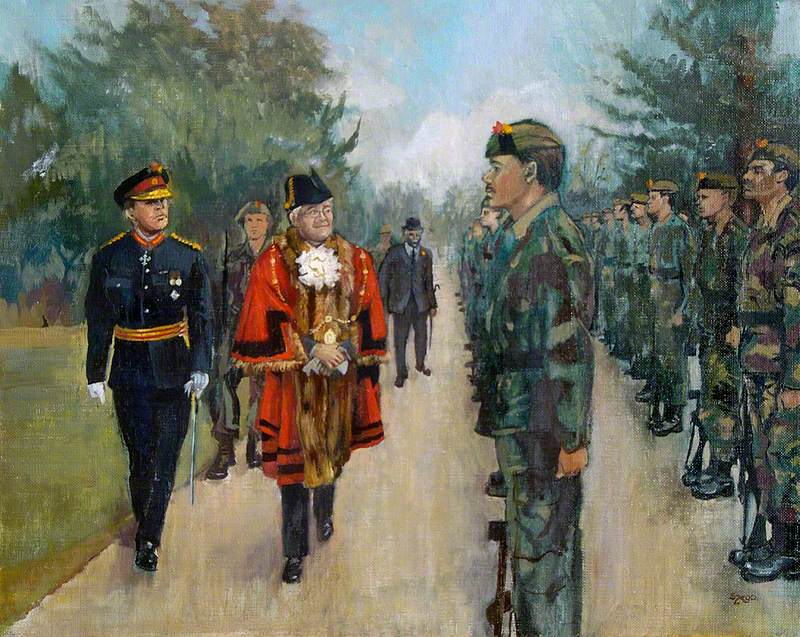
Gilly Szego, Tercentenary of Suffolk Regiment, 1932

Gilly Szego (4 September 1932 – 20 March 2023), sometimes written Gilly Seago, was a British artist. She was the sister of Pamela Roscow, who was a member of the Newmanry.

She trained at Byam Shaw School of Art from 1948 until 1952.

In 1951 she married Holwell Bender, but they later divorced. Together they painted the Television Pavilion Mural, at the Southbank Centre for the Festival of Britain.

In 1956 she met Hungarian refugee John Szego, whom she married and had two children with. He was responsible for making many of the frames and stands for her work. His arrival in London, having escaped Hungary during the Hungarian Revolution of 1956 was the influence for many of Szego's paintings depicting human rights abuses and conflict. They were married until his death in 2013.

In 1968 her painting The Red Skirt was chosen by the Royal Academy of Arts to be exhibited at the Royal Academy Summer Exhibition. In 1969 her work was again chosen to be entered into the summer exhibition, this time showing an oil painting titled Putney Bridge.

In 1970 she was commissioned by Vic Feather to produce an exhibition at Congress House, the headquarters of the Trades Union Congress, in London, where she showed Propellers.

For the St Martin-in-the-Fields refugee action programme in 1972, she showed Mother and Child, as part of efforts to raise awareness of the plight of refugees.

In 1974 she held further exhibitions at the Mall Galleries, the Loggia Gallery as a member of the Free Painters & Sculptors, where Underground Series was first shown.

The Smee Summer Gallery, which Seago owned and ran, published Poems by Primo: Norfolk Life in Verse by Hilda Prime in 1980, which was also illustrated by Seago.

In 1982 she showed Man Woman, an exhibition exploring gender and its fluidity, at the Mall Galleries in London.

In September 2016 she showed Opposites: Conflict and the Human Mind at the Edmund Gallery in Bury St Edmunds, where she now lives.

A retrospective exhibition of her work took place at Protein Studios in Shoreditch, London in December 2017. In response to this exhibit she took part in a short documentary and published a book covering the exhibit in detail.

On 20 March 2023 she died peacefully at Lister Hospital, at the age of 90, surrounded by her family.
