= Robert Gillies =

Robert Gillies may refer to:

- Robert Gillies (New Zealand politician) (1835–1886), Member of Parliament
- Robert Gillies (Australian politician) (1876–1941), member of the New South Wales Legislative Assembly
- Robert Pearse Gillies (1789–1858), Scottish poet and writer
- Bob Gillies (Robert Arthur Gillies; born 1951), Bishop of Aberdeen and Orkney
- Robert Gillies, musician in New Zealand band Split Enz
