= Nancy Fleurival =

Guadeloupean model

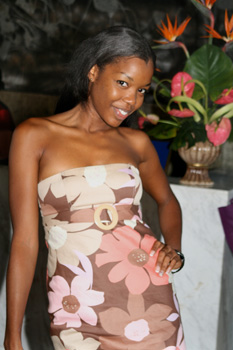
- Born: Nancy Karen Fleurival; Abymes, Guadeloupe
- Beauty pageant titleholder
- Title: Miss Guadeloupe International
- Major competitions: Miss World 2007; Miss International 2008

Nancy Karen Fleurival (born c. 1985) is a Guadeloupean model and beauty pageant titleholder who competed at Miss World 2007.

Fleurival won Miss Guadeloupe World 2007/2008. She was one of the finalists in the Miss Model International pageant held in Martinique and was a semi-finalist in the Miss Caribbean Queen 2008. She represented Guadeloupe in Miss World 2007 in Sanya, China, and also in Miss International 2008 in Macau, China.

Fleurival is the eldest of four siblings from Abymes on the French Caribbean island of Guadeloupe. She earned a degree in economic science and manages a mobile phone shop.

Preceded by Caroline Bevis	Miss World Guadeloupe; 2007	Succeeded by Frédérika Charpentier
