= Ghillie shirt =

Informal traditional Scottish shirt

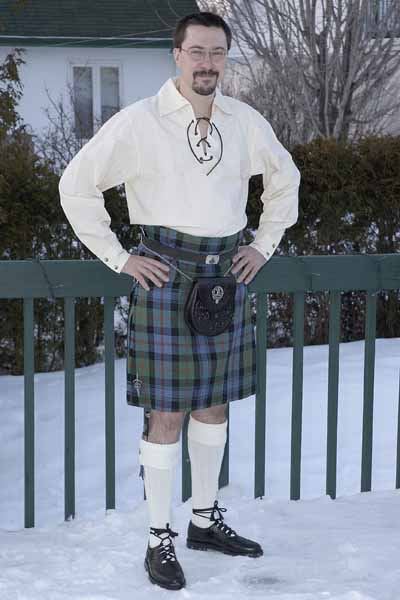
Man in kilt and Ghillie shirt.

A Ghillie shirt, also known as Jacobean or Jacobite, is an informal traditional shirt usually worn with a kilt. The term Ghillie refers to the criss-crossed lacing style made of leather as also seen on the Ghillie Brogue. Ghillie shirts are considered to be more casual than their shirt and waist-coat counterpart that is normally seen with the kilt.

Ghillie shirts are traditionally used for dances or ceilidhs as they are light and spacious to allow for air to pass through. They do not need to be worn with any sort of tie. The Irish version of the Ghillie shirt is the Grandfather shirt.
