= Gilli =

Gilli may refer to:

== People ==
- Gilli (surname), including a list of people with the name
- Gilli (Hebridean earl), 10th- or 11th-century earl in the Hebrides
- Gilli (Løgmaður) (fl. 1000–1024), Faroese lawman
- Gilli Davies (fl. c. 1975–present), Welsh chef
- Gilli Moon (fl. 1998–present), singer-songwriter and record producer
- Gilli Rólantsson (born 1992), Faroese footballer
- Gilli Smyth (1933–2016), English musician
- Gilli (rapper), Danish rapper Kian Rosenberg Larsson (born 1992)

== Other uses ==
- Gilli, Iran, a village in Markazi Province
- Gilli (film), an Indian Kannada-language film
- Gilli (mango), also known as Totapuri, a mango cultivar grown in India

== See also ==
- Ghilli, an Indian Tamil-language film
- Gillie (disambiguation)
- Gillidanda, a traditional Indian sport
