= Gillis (given name) =

Gillis is a masculine given name. Notable people with the name are as follows:

- Gillis Ahlberg (1892–1930), Swedish rower
- Gillis Backereel (1572–1662), Flemish painter
- Gillis Berthout (1175/80–1241), Dutch nobleman
- Gillis Bildt (1820–1894), Swedish politician
- Gillis Claeissens (1526–1605), Flemish painter
- Gillis Coignet (c. 1542 – 1599), Flemish painter
- Gillis II Coignet (1586–1641), Flemish painter
- Gillis van Coninxloo (1544–1607), Flemish painter
- Gillis d'Hondecoeter ((c. 1575-1580–1638), Dutch painter
- Gillis Hooftman (1521–1581), Dutch merchant
- Gillis Grafström (1893–1938), Swedish figure skater
- Gillis William Long (May 4, 1923 – January 20, 1985) American Politician and Lawyer, Member of The House of Representatives for Louisiana
- Gillis Lundgren (1929–2016), Swedish furniture designer
- Gillis Mostaert (1528–1598), Flemish painter
- Gillis Neyts (1618 or 1623–1678), Flemish painter
- Gillis Schagen (1616–1668), Dutch painter
- Gillis van Tilborgh (c. 1625 – c. 1678), Flemish painter
- Gillis Valckenier (1623–1680), Dutch politician
- Gillis Wilson (born 1977), American football player
- Gillis Williams (born 1998), Autism activist, more commonly known as Gillis Willis
