= Filippo Gilli =

Italian footballer (born 2000)

Personal information
- Date of birth: 19 October 2000 (age 26)
- Place of birth: Susa, Italy
- Height: 1.85 m (6 ft 1 in)
- Position: Defender

Team information
- Current team: Derthona

Youth career
- –2019: Torino

Senior career*
Years	Team	Apps	(Gls)
2019–2020	Torino	0	(0)
2019–2020	→ Alessandria (loan)	10	(0)
2020–2021	Arezzo	0	(0)
2021	→ Bisceglie (loan)	5	(0)
2021–2022	Casale	32	(0)
2022–2023	Borgosesia	12	(0)
2023	Asti	0	(0)
2023–	Borgosesia	16	(1)
	Derthona	24	(0)

International career^{‡}
2017	Italy U17	2	(0)
2017	Italy U18	1	(0)
- * Club domestic league appearances and goals as of 20 December 2023 ‡ National team caps and goals as of 9 August 2017

Filippo Gilli (born 19 October 2000) is an Italian football player who plays for Serie D club Derthona.

== Club career ==
=== Torino ===
He was raised in Torino youth teams and started playing for their Under-19 squad in the 2017–18 season.

He was called up to the senior squad for the first time on 1 August 2019 in a Europa League qualifier against Debrecen. He remained on the bench.

==== Loan to Alessandria ====
On 2 September 2019 he joined Serie C club Alessandria on loan.

He made his professional Serie C debut for Alessandria on 22 September 2019 in a game against Pianese. He substituted Alberto Dossena in the 77th minute.

=== Arezzo ===
On 22 September 2020, he moved to Arezzo.

==== Loan to Bisceglie ====
On 13 January 2021, he was loaned to Bisceglie.

== International career ==
He played his first game for his country on 14 March 2017 in a Euro U17 qualifier against Belarus. He was not chosen for the final tournament squad.
