= Maya Gilliss-Chapman =

- Born: Ratha Rath; Kandal, Cambodia
- Education: University of California, Berkeley
- Occupation: Nonprofit executive
- Organization: Cambodians in Tech

Maya Gilliss-Chapman (born Ratha Rath) is a Cambodian-American social entrepreneur and startup advisor. She is currently the founder and CEO of Cambodians in Tech, a 501(c)(3) nonprofit based in Silicon Valley, California. She was Cambodia's representative in international beauty pageants between 2016 and 2017.

== Early life ==
Gilliss-Chapman was born in the Kandal Province of Cambodia. She was brought to the capital city of Phnom Penh as an orphan. The circumstances around her transport from Kandal to Phnom Penh remain unknown. She was brought to the United States in 1991 and resided in the city of Oakland, California.

== Education ==
Maya attended the University of California, Berkeley and graduated with a B.A. in Legal Studies.

== Career ==
Gilliss-Chapman is a technology analyst focusing on emerging markets and sporting technology. After working in Silicon Valley, Gilliss-Chapman returned to Cambodia to help develop the Cambodian technology sector. Later, she broadened her focus to the greater Southeast Asian region.

=== Cambodians in Tech ===
In 2014, Gilliss-Chapman founded Cambodians in Tech to help Cambodian refugees obtain jobs in the technology industry. It was considered the first worldwide technology movement for Cambodians. In 2016, Cambodians in Tech became a 501(c)(3) nonprofit.

=== Film ===
In 2019, Gilliss-Chapman was cast as Peuv in the English version of Funan which was sold to Netflix. In 2020, the English-dub version of Funan was released on Netflix.
