= Gille =

Gille may refer to:

- Gille (singer) (born 1987), Japanese singer
- Gille (surname)
- Gille dynasty, a royal house of Norway
- The singular of Gilles, a carnival costume tradition of Belgium
