= William Stephen Gilly =

English cleric and author

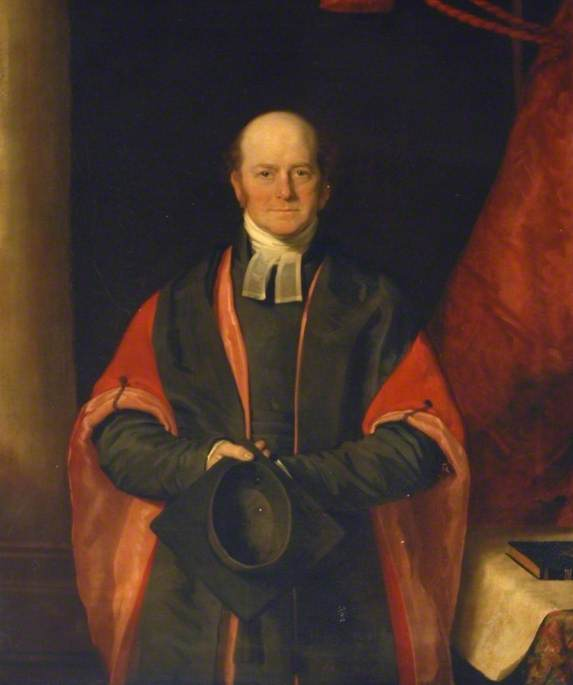
William Stephen Gilly

William Stephen Gilly (1789–1855) was an English cleric and author, known for his support of the Waldensian Church.

== Life ==
Born on 28 January 1789, he was the son of William Gilly (died 1837), rector of Hawkedon, Suffolk, and of Wanstead, Essex. In November 1797 he was admitted at Christ's Hospital, London, whence he proceeded in 1808 to Caius College, Cambridge, but graduated B.A. as a member of St Catharine Hall in 1812. He proceeded M.A. in 1817, and accumulated his degrees in divinity in 1833. In 1817 he was presented by Lord Chancellor Eldon to the rectory of North Fambridge in Essex.

Gilly paid the first of many visits to the Protestant Vaudois or Waldensians, in what is now northern Italy, in 1823. Public reaction to his Narrative took the form of subscription for the Waldensians, headed by George IV and Shute Barrington, bishop of Durham, in part for the endowment of a college and library at Torre Pellice in Piedmont. On 13 May 1826 Gilly was collated to a prebendal stall in Durham Cathedral. The following year he became perpetual curate of St Margaret's Church, Durham, and in 1831 vicar of Norham, near Berwick-on-Tweed. In 1853 he was appointed canon residentiary of Durham. John Charles Beckwith decided to settle with the Waldensians.

Gilly died at Norham on 10 September 1855.

== Works ==
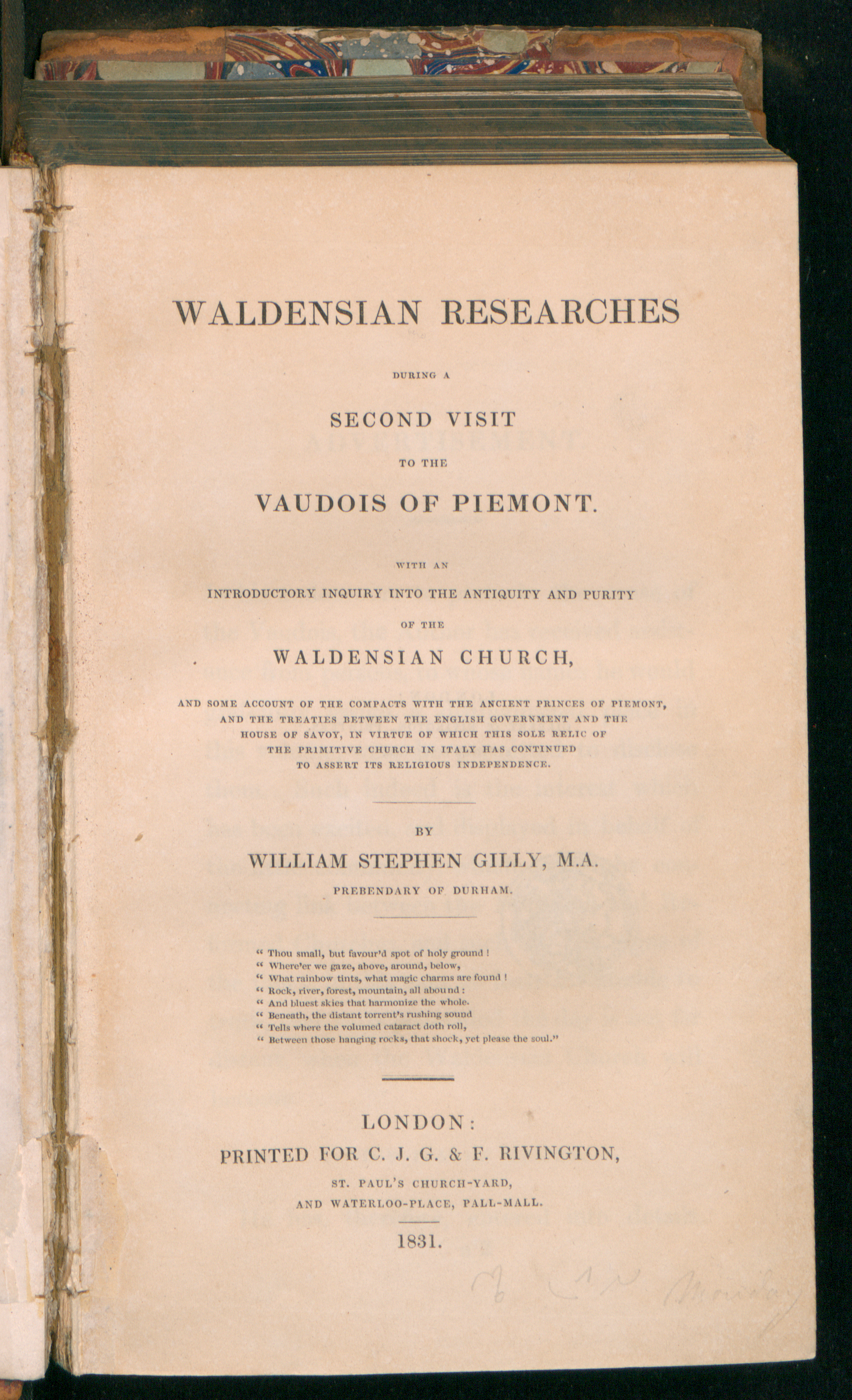
Title page of William Stephen Gilly's Waldensian Researches (1831)

Gilly became known for Narrative of an Excursion to the Mountains of Piemont, and Researches among the Vaudois, or Waldenses, London, 1824; 3rd edition, 1826. His other works included:

- The Spirit of the Gospel, or the Four Evangelists, elucidated by explanatory observations, London, 1818.
- Horæ Catecheticæ, or an exposition of the duty and advantages of Public Catechising in Church, London, 1828.
- Waldensian Researches during a second Visit to the Vaudois of Piemont, London, 1831.
- A Memoir of Felix Neff, pastor of the High Alps, London, 1832 (many editions); on Felix Neff. Lord Monson published in 1840 some folio Views in illustration of this memoir.
- Our Protestant Forefathers, London, 1835 (many editions).
- Valdenses, Valdo, and Vigilantius (Edinburgh, 1841) articles reprinted from the Encyclopædia Britannica seventh edition; Vigilantius was reprinted separately in 1844.
- The Romaunt Version of the Gospel according to St. John. With an introductory history, London, 1848.
- A Comparative View of the progress of Popular Instruction. Two Lectures, Durham, 1848.

Gilly contributed prefaces to: Narratives of Shipwrecks of the Royal Navy, between 1793 and 1849, compiled mainly from Admiralty documents by his son William O. S. Gilly; and the Short History of the Waldensian Church, 1855, by Jane Louisa Willyams. Three letters in the British Magazine for 1841 were reprinted in James Henthorn Todd's Books of the Vaudois, 1865.

Wishing to better the life of agricultural labourers in north Northumberland, Gilly wrote The Peasantry of the Border; an Appeal in their behalf, Berwick-upon-Tweed, 1841 (2nd edition, London, 1842). He called the attention of landowners to the poor condition of labourers' cottages.

== Family ==
He married, in December 1825, Jane Charlotte Mary, only daughter of Major Colberg, who survived him. Their children included William Octavius Shakespeare (died 1860) and Charles Pudsey (died 1904).

== Notes ==
Attribution

This article incorporates text from a publication now in the public domain: Stephen, Leslie, ed. (1890). "Gilly, William Stephen". Dictionary of National Biography. Vol. 21. London: Smith, Elder & Co.
