= McGillis =

McGillis is a surname. Notable people with the surname include:

- Angus McGillis (1874–1944), Canadian farmer and politician
- Dan McGillis (born 1972), Canadian ice hockey player
- Kelly McGillis (born 1957), American actress
- Tom McGillis, Canadian writer and producer

== See also ==
- Gillis (surname)
- McGinnis
