= Miss Guadeloupe =

French beauty pageant

- Type: Beauty pageant
- Headquarters: Guadeloupe, France
- Members: Miss France
- Official language: French
- Regional director: Sandrine Derrick

Miss Guadeloupe is a French beauty pageant which selects a representative for the Miss France national competition from the overseas region of Guadeloupe. The first Miss Guadeloupe was crowned in 1937, although the pageant was not held regularly until 1977.

The current Miss Guadeloupe is Julia Désirée, who was crowned Miss Guadeloupe 2026 on 16 July 2026. A total of four women from Guadeloupe have been crowned Miss France:

- Véronique de la Cruz, who was crowned Miss France 1993
- Corinne Coman, who was crowned Miss France 2003
- Clémence Botino, who was crowned Miss France 2020
- Indira Ampiot, who was crowned Miss France 2023

== Results summary ==
- Miss France: Véronique de la Cruz (1992); Corinne Coman (2002); Clémence Botino (2019); Indira Ampiot (2022)
- 1st Runner-Up: Sandra Bisson (2001); Ophély Mezino (2018)
- 2nd Runner-Up: Paulette Battet (1984)
- 3rd Runner-Up: Francette Bulin (1990); Ludmilla Canourgues (1994); Alicia Bausivoir (1995); Patricia Sellin (1996); Morgane Thérésine (2016); Jalylane Maës (2023); Moïra André (2024); Naomi Torrent (2025)
- 4th Runner-Up: Joëlle Ursull (1978); Chloé Deher (2013)
- 5th Runner-Up: Elydie Billioti de Gage (1979)
- 6th Runner-Up: Micheline Babin (1980)
- Top 12/Top 15: Marie-Laure Thomaseau (1989); Daïana Mary (2003); Mandy Falla (2007); Rebecca Erivan (2008); Chloé Mozar (2014); Kenza Andreze-Louison (2019)

== Gallery ==
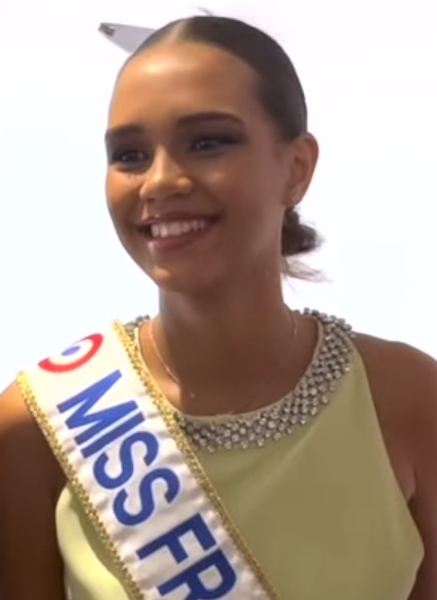
Miss Guadeloupe 2022 and Miss France 2023
Indira Ampiot

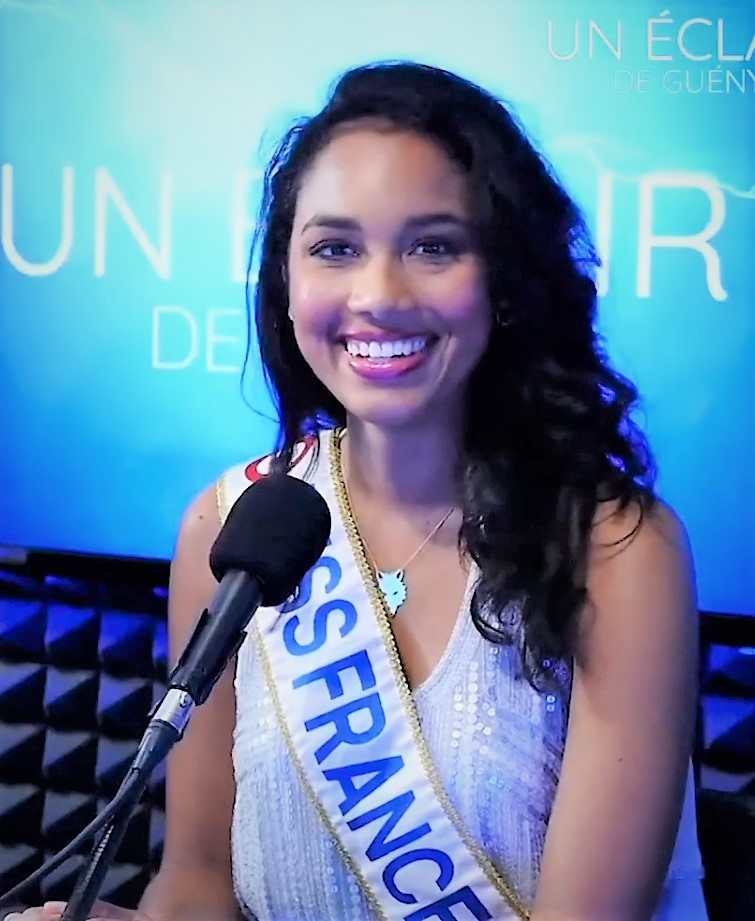
Miss Guadeloupe 2019 and Miss France 2020
Clémence Botino

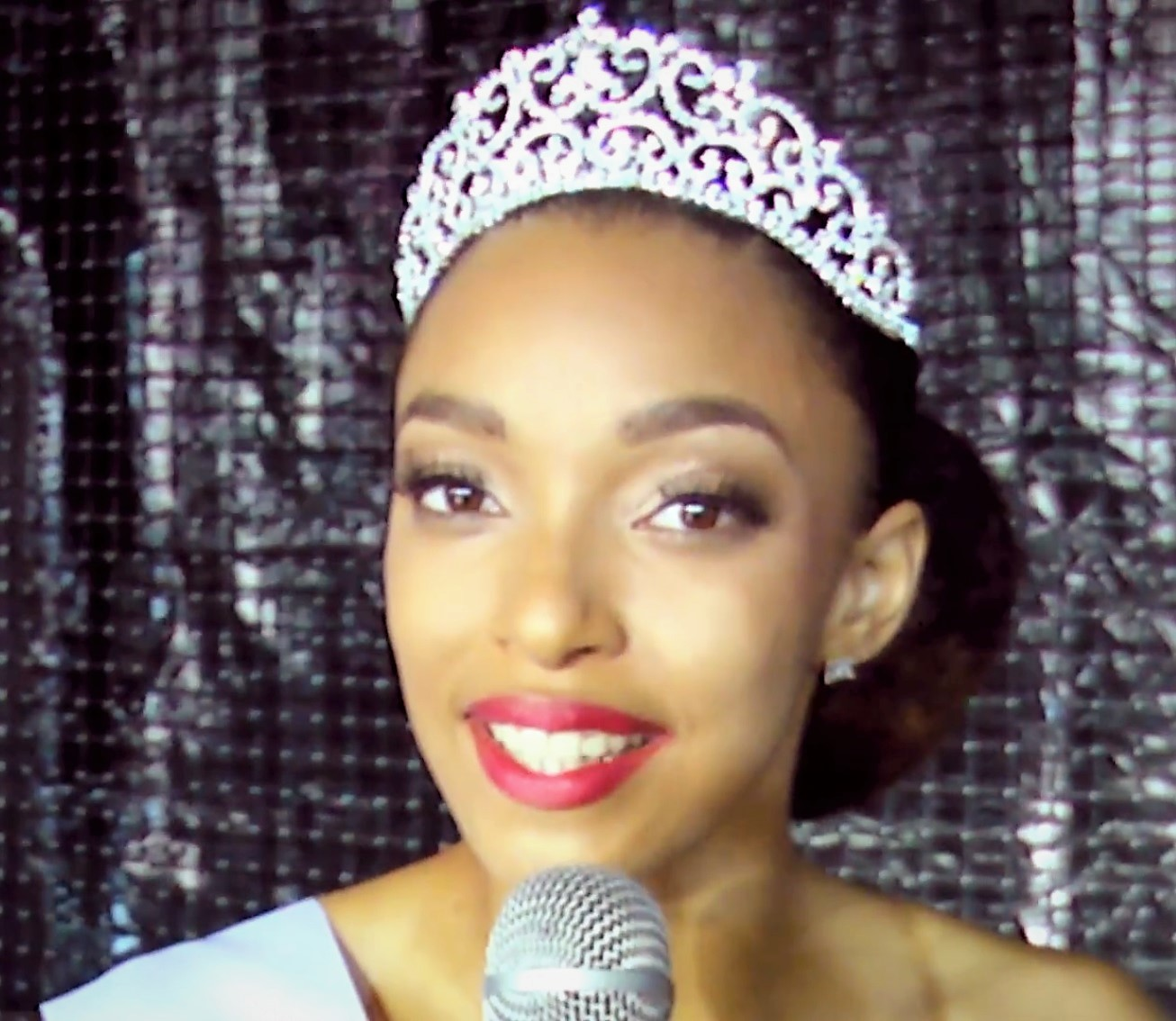
Miss Guadeloupe 2018
Ophély Mézino

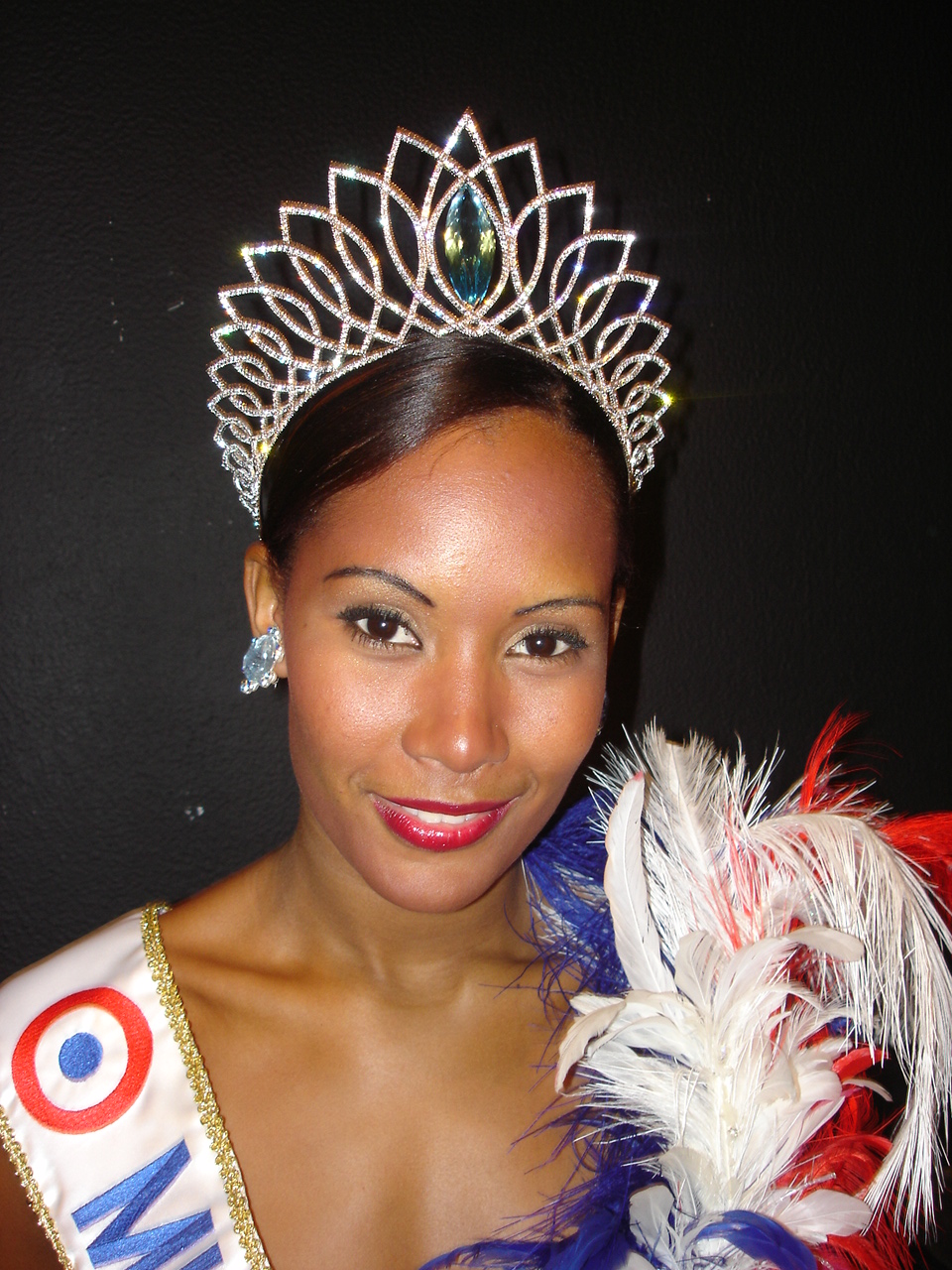
Miss Guadeloupe 2002 and Miss France 2003
Corinne Coman

== Titleholders ==
Year	Name	Age (Note: Ages at the time of Miss France)	Height	Hometown	Miss France placement	Notes
2026	Julia Désirée	20	1.81 m (5 ft 11 1/2 in)	Les Abymes	TBD	
2025	Naomi Torrent	30	1.76 m (5 ft 9 1/2 in)	Basse-Terre	3rd Runner-Up	
2024	Moïra André	28	1.71 m (5 ft 7 1/2 in)	Terre-de-Bas	3rd Runner-Up	
2023	Jalylane Maës	18	1.73 m (5 ft 8 in)	Les Abymes	3rd Runner-Up	
2022	Indira Ampiot	18	1.77 m (5 ft 9 1/2 in)	Basse-Terre	Miss France 2023	Top 30 at Miss Universe 2024 (representing France) Top 12 at Miss World 2026 (representing France)
2021	Ludivine Edmond	20	1.76 m (5 ft 9 1/2 in)	Gourbeyre		
2020	Kenza Andreze-Louison	20	1.76 m (5 ft 9 1/2 in)	Baie-Mahault	Top 15	
2019	Clémence Botino	22	1.75 m (5 ft 9 in)	Le Gosier	Miss France 2020	Top 10 at Miss Universe 2021 (representing France) Top 40 at Miss World 2023 (representing France)
2018	Ophély Mézino	19	1.72 m (5 ft 7 1/2 in)	Morne-à-l'Eau	1st Runner-Up	1st Runner-Up at Miss World 2019 (representing France) Top 12 at Miss Universe 2025 (representing Guadeloupe)
2017	Johane Matignon	18	1.75 m (5 ft 9 in)	Saint-François		
2016	Morgane Thérésine	20	1.77 m (5 ft 9 1/2 in)	Le Gosier	3rd Runner-Up	Competed at Miss World 2018 (representing Guadeloupe)
2015	Johanna Delphin	20	1.77 m (5 ft 9 1/2 in)	Baie-Mahault		Delphin was crowned Miss Guadeloupe and Northern Isles (French: Miss Guadeloupe-Îles du Nord), and represented Guadeloupe, Saint Martin, and Saint Barthélemy.
2014	Chloé Mozar	18	1.80 m (5 ft 11 in)	Les Abymes	Top 12	
2013	Chloé Deher	18	1.77 m (5 ft 9 1/2 in)	Terre-de-Haut	4th Runner-Up	Will compete at Miss Universe 2026 (representing Guadeloupe)
2012	Cynthia Tinédor	20	1.75 m (5 ft 9 in)	Sainte-Rose		
2011	Cindy Le Pape	21	1.72 m (5 ft 7 1/2 in)	Le Moule		
2010	Jenny Vulgaire	21	1.73 m (5 ft 8 in)	Petit-Bourg		
2009	Angélique Duro	21	1.78 m (5 ft 10 in)	Saint-François		
2008	Rebecca Erivan	18	1.84 m (6 ft 1/2 in)	Basse-Terre	Top 12	
2007	Mandy Falla	18	1.76 m (5 ft 9 1/2 in)	Les Abymes	Top 12	
2006	Safia Randal	18	1.76 m (5 ft 9 1/2 in)	Petit-Bourg		
2005	Jessy Gamon	20	1.77 m (5 ft 9 1/2 in)	Baie-Mahault		
2004	Maïté Baptiste	19	1.80 m (5 ft 11 in)	Le Moule		
2003	Daïana Mary	19	1.77 m (5 ft 9 1/2 in)	Saint-François	Top 12	
2002	Corinne Coman	19	1.79 m (5 ft 10 1/2 in)	Sainte-Anne	Miss France 2003	
2001	Sandra Bisson	21	1.75 m (5 ft 9 in)	Pointe-à-Pitre	1st Runner-Up	
2000	Sabrina Cyrille	18	1.75 m (5 ft 9 in)	Gourbeyre		
1999	Sylvie Albina	18	1.76 m (5 ft 9 1/2 in)	Basse-Terre		
1998	Suzanne Galin	21	1.74 m (5 ft 8 1/2 in)	Les Abymes		
1997	Estelle Tite	18	1.81 m (5 ft 11 1/2 in)	Sainte-Anne		
1996	Patricia Sellin	18		Sainte-Anne	3rd Runner-Up	
1995	Alicia Bausivoir			Les Abymes	3rd Runner-Up	
1994	Ludmilla Canourgues	18		Les Abymes	3rd Runner-Up	
1993	Béatrice Levalois			Le Gosier		
1992	Véronique de la Cruz	18	1.75 m (5 ft 9 in)	Saint-François	Miss France 1993	Competed at Miss Universe 1993 (representing France) Top 10 at Miss World 1993 (representing France)
1991	Sylvana Garnier			Pointe-Noire		
1990	Francette Bulin	20	1.74 m (5 ft 8 1/2 in)	Basse-Terre	3rd Runner-Up	
1989	Marie-Laure Thomaseau			Pointe-à-Pitre	Top 12	
1988	Gladys Carene	18	1.69 m (5 ft 6 1/2 in)			
1987	Adélaïde Annie			Morne-à-l'Eau		
1986	Corinne Lumot					
1985	Catherine Carew					Competed at Miss Universe 1986 (representing France)
1984	Paulette Battet				2nd Runner-Up	
1980	Micheline Babin	20	1.70 m (5 ft 7 in)	Basse-Terre	6th Runner-Up	
1979	Elydie Billioti de Gage				5th Runner-Up	
1978	Joëlle Ursull	18	1.72 m (5 ft 7 1/2 in)	Morne-à-l'Eau	4th Runner-Up	Represented France at the Eurovision Song Contest 1990 with the song "White and Black Blues"
1977	Line Debar-Monclair	20	1.72 m (5 ft 7 1/2 in)			
1955	Jacqueline Bourgeois Gard	21			Did not compete	
1937	Monique Cazalan					
