= Maëva Coucke =

French model and beauty queen (born 1994)

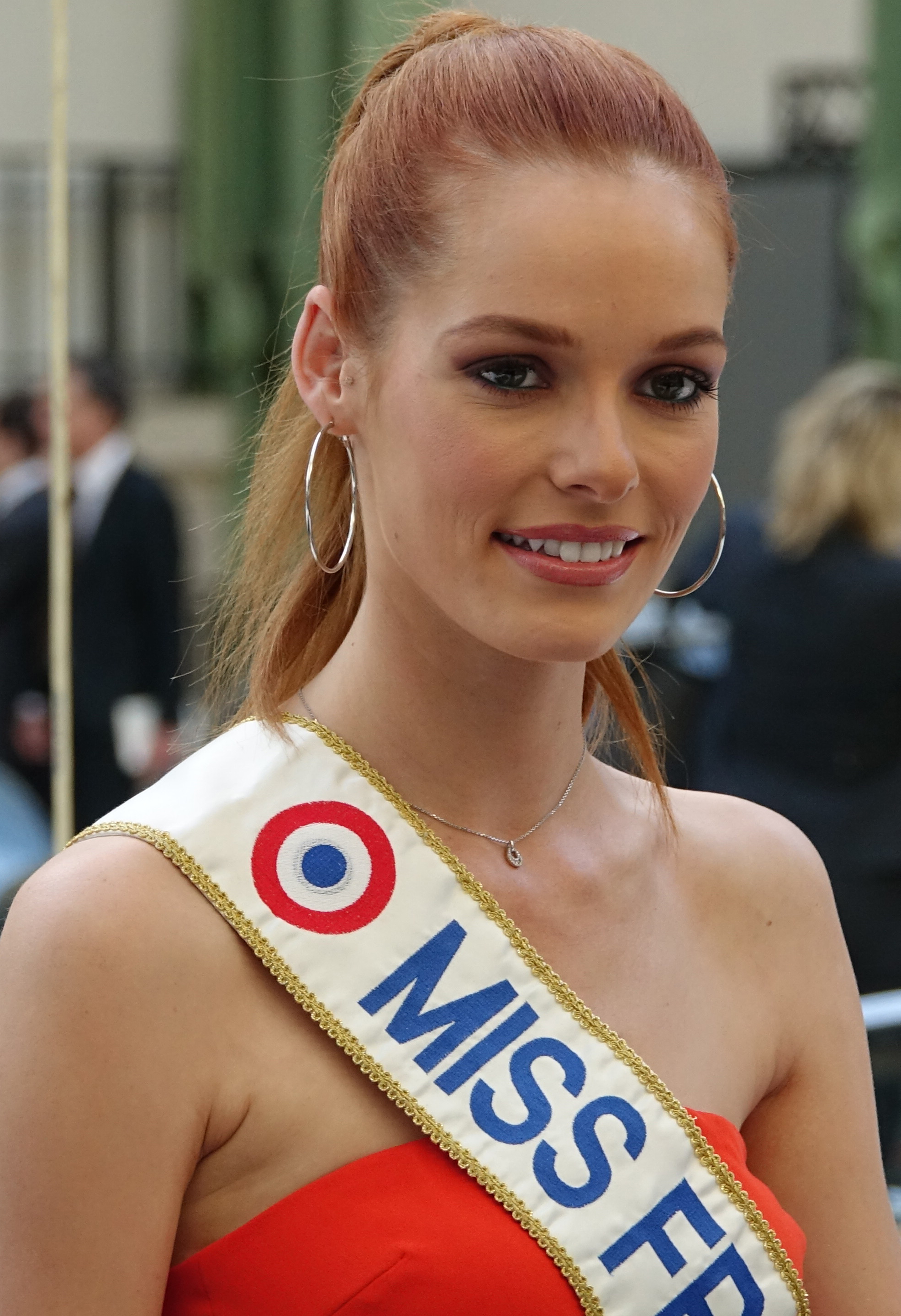
- Coucke at the 2018 Tour Auto Optic 2000 in Paris
- Born: 28 June 1994 (age 32); Fougères, France
- Height: 1.76 m (5 ft 9 1/2 in)
- Beauty pageant titleholder
- Title: Miss Pévèle 2016; Miss Nord-Pas-de-Calais 2017; Miss France 2018
- Hair color: Red
- Eye color: Brown
- Major competitions: Miss France 2018 (Winner); Miss World 2018 (Top 12); Miss Universe 2019 (Top 10)

Maëva Coucke (born 28 June 1994) is a French model and beauty pageant titleholder who was crowned Miss France 2018. She represented France at Miss World 2018, where she placed in the top twelve, and also represented France at Miss Universe 2019, where she placed in the top ten. Coucke is the third Miss France winner from Nord-Pas-de-Calais within the span of four years, following Iris Mittenaere (2016) and Camille Cerf (2015).

== Early life and education ==
Coucke was born in Fougères in the Ille-et-Vilaine department in Brittany. She spent the first six years of her life residing in the nearby town of Louvigné-du-Désert, before relocating with her family to the town of Ferques in the Pas-de-Calais department of Nord-Pas-de-Calais. Her father is a gendarme, while her mother is a childcare assistant originally from Avesnes-sur-Helpe in the Nord department. She has an older sister, Victoria, and a twin sister, Alizée. Her parents divorced when she was 13, and she was then raised by her mother.

Coucke attended primary school and collège in Marquise, and later lycée at Lycée Giraux-Sannier in Saint-Martin-Boulogne. In 2011, Coucke participated in the Elite Model Look contest with her twin sister. She received her baccalauréat with a focus in management in 2013, and after graduating, Coucke received a brevet de technicien supérieur (BTS) diploma in international business in 2015. In 2017, Coucke was a first year law student and wanted to become an in-house counsel. After becoming Miss France 2018, she stated that she hoped to pursue an acting career.

Coucke is a natural blonde, but has been dyeing her hair red since 2016.

== Pageantry ==
=== Miss France 2018 ===
Coucke started her pageantry career in 2013, when she was crowned Miss Boulogne 2013. In October 2016, Coucke was crowned Miss Pévèle 2016 and therefore, was allowed to compete in the Miss Nord-Pas-de-Calais 2017 competition. On 23 September 2017, she was crowned Miss Nord-Pas-de-Calais 2017 in Orchies, then represented Nord-Pas-de-Calais at Miss France 2018. Coucke won the competition, and was crowned Miss France 2018. She is the third woman from Nord-Pas-de-Calais to win the title, following Miss France 2016 Iris Mittenaere and Miss France 2015 Camille Cerf.

Coucke began to raise awareness for breast cancer after her mother was diagnosed with the disease in 2012. As Miss France 2018, she promoted the development of breast cancer prevention and screening. She was involved in make-up and dance workshops in hospitals to help women undergoing cancer treatment feel more confident in themselves. On 1 October 2018, she launched the Breast Cancer Awareness Month at the Eiffel Tower which was lit up in rosy pink lights to support Breast cancer awareness.

=== Miss World 2018 ===
Coucke represented France at Miss World 2018, where she placed in the top 12. At Miss World 2018, she won the Top Model fast track event, giving her direct access into the top thirty. She was also Top 5 in the Multimedia competition and won the first round of the Head to Head challenge.

=== Miss Universe 2019 ===
After Vaimalama Chaves opted not to compete in an international pageant, the Miss France Organisation confirmed on 23 September 2019 that they had appointed Coucke to represent France at Miss Universe 2019.

During the preliminary competition, Coucke slipped and fell on stage, along with several other contestants who also fell in the same spot. The incident was widely reported in the Francophone media, but it did not prevent her to place in the top ten. She ultimately went on to advance as one of the top five contestants from Europe, ultimately finishing in the overall top ten.

Awards and achievements
Preceded by (Corsica) Eva Colas	Miss Universe France; 2019	Succeeded by (Normandy) Amandine Petit
Preceded by (Nigeria) Ugochi Mitchel Ihezue	Miss World Top Model; 2018	Succeeded by (Nigeria) Nyekachi Douglas
Preceded by (Languedoc-Roussillon) Aurore Kichenin	Miss World France; 2018	Succeeded by (Guadeloupe) Ophély Mézino
Preceded by (French Guiana) Alicia Aylies	Miss France; 2018	Succeeded by (French Polynesia) Vaimalama Chaves
Preceded by Laurine Maricau	Miss Nord-Pas-de-Calais; 2017	Succeeded by Annabelle Varane
Preceded by Charlotte Bobb	Miss Pévèle; 2016	Succeeded by Meggy Pinte
