= Miss Corsica =

- Type: Beauty pageant
- Headquarters: Corsica, France
- Members: Miss France
- Official language: French
- Regional director: Mariana Bozzi

Miss Corsica (French: Miss Corse) is a French beauty pageant which selects a representative for the Miss France national competition from the region of Corsica. The first Miss Corsica was crowned in 1920, although the competition was not organized regularly until 1988.

The current Miss Corsica is Satine Nomary, who was crowned Miss Corsica 2026 on 23 July 2026. One woman from Corsica has been crowned Miss France:

- Pauline Pô, who was crowned Miss France 1921

== Results summary ==
- Miss France: Pauline Pô (1920)
- 1st Runner-Up: Marie-Ange Contart Caitucoli (1992); Stéphanie Faby (2000); Eva Colas (2017)
- 2nd Runner-Up: Stella Vangioni (2025)
- 3rd Runner-Up: Lydie Morochi (1972); Marie-Christine Mattei (1984)
- 5th Runner-Up: Karine Colonna (1999)
- 6th Runner-Up: Elodie Moreau (2018); Geneviève Deveraux (2022)
- Top 12/Top 15: Corinne Ferrandiz (1988); Marie-Pierre Raffaelli (1991); Christelle Godani (1993); Sabrina Chabrier (2002); Jade Morel (2010); Noémie Leca (2020); Emma Renucci (2021); Sandra Bak (2023)

== Gallery ==
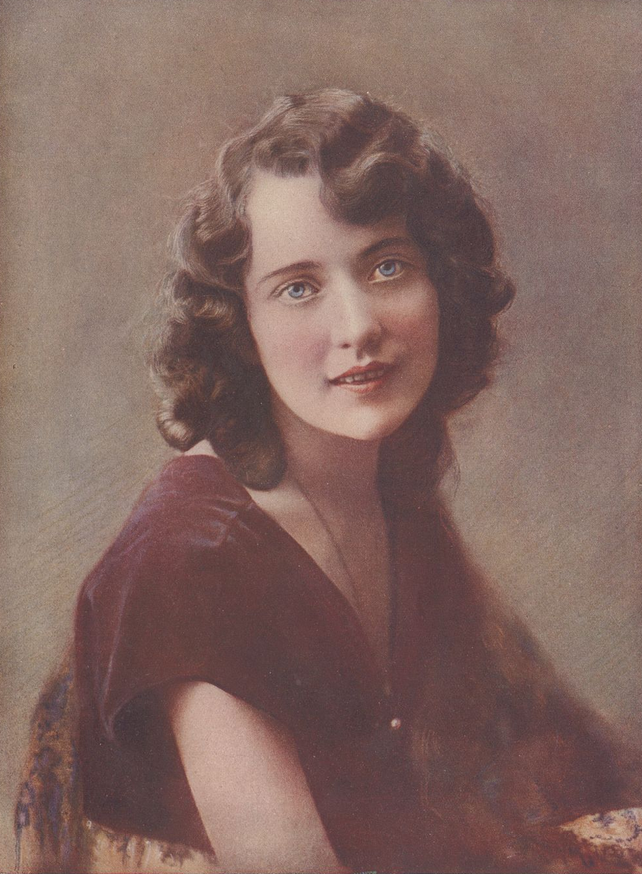
Miss Corsica 1920 and Miss France 1921
Pauline Pô

== Titleholders ==
| Year | Name | Age (Note: Ages at the time of Miss France) | Height | Hometown | Miss France placement | Notes |
|---|---|---|---|---|---|---|
| 2026 | Satine Nomary | 20 | 1.76 m (5 ft 9 1/2 in) | Grosseto-Prugna | TBD | |
| 2025 | Manon Mateus | 23 | 1.70 m (5 ft 7 in) | Sartène | | |
| 2024 | Stella Vangioni | 27 | 1.71 m (5 ft 7 1/2 in) | Bastia | 2nd Runner-Up | |
| 2023 | Sandra Bak | 23 | 1.71 m (5 ft 7 1/2 in) | Ajaccio | Top 15 | |
| 2022 | Orianne Meloni | 22 | 1.83 m (6 ft 0 in) | Ajaccio | | |
| 2021 | Emma Renucci | 19 | 1.76 m (5 ft 9 1/2 in) | Bastia | Top 15 | |
| 2020 | Noémie Leca | 20 | 1.75 m (5 ft 9 in) | Cargèse | Top 15 | |
| 2019 | Alixia Cauro | 20 | 1.77 m (5 ft 9 1/2 in) | San-Gavino-di-Carbini | | Cauro is the niece of Maryse Lanfranchi, Miss Corsica 1971. |
| 2018 | Manon Jean-Mistral | 18 | 1.74 m (5 ft 8 1/2 in) | Porto-Vecchio | | |
| 2017 | Eva Colas | 21 | 1.70 m (5 ft 7 in) | Bastia | 1st Runner-Up | Competed at Miss Universe 2018 |
| 2016 | Laetitia Duclos | 19 | 1.70 m (5 ft 7 in) | Grosseto-Prugna | | |
| 2015 | Jessica Garcia | 21 | 1.70 m (5 ft 7 in) | Furiani | | |
| 2014 | Dorine Rossi | 20 | 1.83 m (6 ft 0 in) | Porto-Vecchio | | |
| 2013 | Cécilia Napoli | 19 | 1.71 m (5 ft 7 1/2 in) | Bastia | | |
| 2012 | Louise Robert | 22 | 1.80 m (5 ft 11 in) | Ajaccio | | |
| 2011 | Camille Mallea | 20 | 1.72 m (5 ft 7 1/2 in) | Bastelica | | |
| 2010 | Jade Morel | 23 | 1.76 m (5 ft 9 1/2 in) | Castineta | Top 12 | |
| 2009 | Céline Nicolai | 21 | 1.77 m (5 ft 9 1/2 in) | Ajaccio | | |
| 2008 | Maria Santa Lucchinacci | 24 | 1.78 m (5 ft 10 in) | Ajaccio | | |
| 2007 | Vanessa Mangavel | 21 | 1.80 m (5 ft 11 in) | Ajaccio | | |
| 2006 | Audrey Pillot | 18 | 1.77 m (5 ft 9 1/2 in) | Carbuccia | | |
| 2005 | Jessica Arrighi | 19 | 1.73 m (5 ft 8 in) | L'Île-Rousse | | |
| 2004 | Claudia Massei | 19 | 1.75 m (5 ft 9 in) | | | |
| 2003 | Savéria Poli | 20 | 1.73 m (5 ft 8 in) | Eccica-Suarella | | |
| 2002 | Sabrina Chabrier | | | Sarrola-Carcopino | Top 12 | |
| 2001 | Jessica Mathieu | | | Bastia | | |
| 2000 | Stéphanie Faby | | | Porto-Vecchio | 1st Runner-Up | |
| 1999 | Karine Colonna | 18 | 1.77 m (5 ft 9 1/2 in) | Castirla | Top 12 (5th Runner-Up) | |
| 1998 | Dany Casella | 21 | 1.72 m (5 ft 7 1/2 in) | Grosseto-Prugna | | |
| 1997 | Aurélie Fournier | 21 | 1.70 m (5 ft 7 in) | | | |
| 1996 | Alice Taglioni | 20 | 1.77 m (5 ft 9 1/2 in) | | Did not compete | Taglioni resigned after refusing to compete in Miss France, and was replaced by Cheuva, her first runner-up. |
| 1996 | Delphine Cheuva | | | | | Taglioni resigned after refusing to compete in Miss France, and was replaced by Cheuva, her first runner-up. |
| 1995 | Karine Caparelli | | | Ajaccio | | |
| 1994 | Vanessa Gilormini | | | Patrimonio | | |
| 1993 | Christelle Godani | | | | Top 12 | |
| 1992 | Marie-Ange Contart Caitucoli | 17 | | | 1st Runner-Up | Competed at Miss International 1993 |
| 1991 | Marie-Pierre Raffaelli | | | | Top 12 | |
| 1990 | Géraldine Laurent | | | | | |
| 1989 | Marie-Françoise Pantalacci | | | | | |
| 1988 | Corinne Ferrandiz | | | | Top 12 | |
| 1984 | Marie-Christine Mattei | | | | 3rd Runner-Up | |
| 1979 | Claire Galli | | | | | |
| 1972 | Lydie Morochi | 17 | | Ajaccio | 3rd Runner-Up | |
| 1971 | Maryse Lanfranchi | | | | | Lanfranchi is the aunt of Alixia Cauro, Miss Corsica 2019. |
| 1965 | Marie-Paule Antoni | | | | | |
| 1963 | Gisèle Lanfranchi | | | | | |
| 1962 | Marie-José Ottomanie | | | | | |
| 1961 | Régine Guelfucci | | | | | |
| 1957 | Evelyne Paccini | | | | | |
| 1956 | Nicole Poli | | | | | |
| 1953 | Béatrice Renucci | | | | | |
| 1950 | Antoinette D'Arco | | | Bonifacio | | |
| 1948 | Yvonne Muracciole | | | | | |
| 1939 | Micheline Landini | | | | | |
| 1936 | Marie Ronchi | | | | | |
| 1935 | Caroline de Peretti | | | | | |
| 1934 | Suzanne Versini | | | | | |
| 1932 | Léo Lenzi | | | | | |
| 1931 | Rolande Risterucci | | | | | |
| 1927 | Colette Nicolini | | | | | |
| 1920 | Pauline Pô | 16 | | | Miss France 1921 | |
