= Miss France 2018 =

88th Miss France competition, national beauty pageant edition

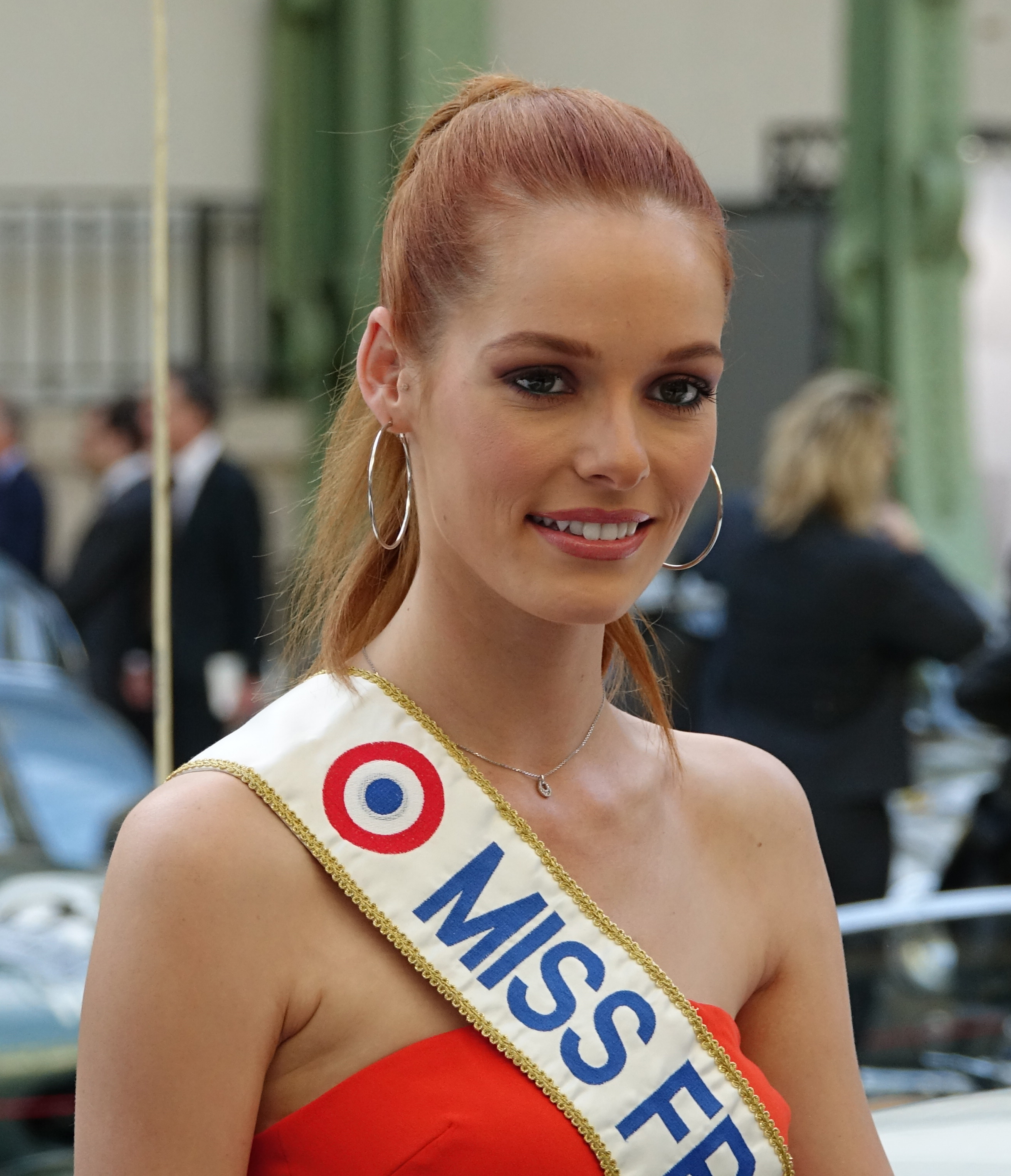
- Miss France 2018 Maëva Coucke
- Date: 16 December 2017
- Presenters: Jean-Pierre Foucault; Sylvie Tellier; Alicia Aylies
- Entertainment: Ed Sheeran
- Venue: M.A.CH 36, Châteauroux-Déols, Centre-Val de Loire
- Broadcaster: TF1
- Entrants: 30
- Placements: 12
- Withdrawals: Saint Martin and Saint Barthélemy
- Returns: Saint Pierre and Miquelon
- Winner: Maëva Coucke; Nord-Pas-de-Calais
- Congeniality: Turouru Temorere; Tahiti
- Photogenic: Paoulina Prylutska; Picardy

Miss France 2018 was the 88th edition of the Miss France pageant, held on 16 December 2017 at the M.A.CH 36 in Châteauroux, Centre-Val de Loire.

Miss France 2017 Alicia Aylies of French Guiana crowned her successor Maëva Coucke of Nord-Pas-de-Calais at the end of the event. She represented France at Miss World 2018 and Miss Universe 2019.

== Results ==
Placement	Contestant
Miss France 2018	Nord-Pas-de-Calais – Maëva Coucke
1st Runner-Up	Corsica – Eva Colas
2nd Runner-Up	Île-de-France – Lison DiMartino
3rd Runner-Up	Champagne-Ardenne – Safiatou Guinot
4th Runner-Up	Reunion – Audrey Chane Pao Kan
Top 12	Aquitaine – Cassandra Jullia (5th Runner-Up); French Guiana – Ruth Briquet (6th Runner-Up); Languedoc-Roussillon – Alizée Rieu; Limousin – Anaïs Berthomier; Martinique – Laure-Anaïs Abidal; Provence – Kleofina Pnishi; Rhône-Alpes – Dalida Benaoudia

== History ==
On 18 May 2017, the Miss France Organization announced that the 2018 pageant would take place at the M.A.CH 36 in Châteauroux, Centre-Val de Loire. It was the first time that the pageant took place in Châteauroux and the fourth time in the Centre-Val de Loire region.

The ceremony was broadcast on TF1, and was presented by Jean-Pierre Foucault and the national director Sylvie Tellier.

== Preliminary activities ==
The contestants traveled to California, United States for their preliminary travel. Then, rehearsals took place in the host city Châteauroux.

== Final night ==
The year's theme was "celebrations", including outfits inspired by Fête de la Musique, Bastille Day, and music festivals like Coachella. For the first time since Miss France 2004, the opening was held in national costume, with Ed Sheeran as a musical guest.

The ceremony followed this order :

- Opening with Ed Sheeran, the contestants showed their regional costumes.
- First presentation round, on the theme of the Traveling carnival.
- Second presentation round, with a 14 Juillet theme.
- Third and last presentation round inspired by Fête de la Musique.
- Carnival-themed swimsuit segment, including Miss France 2017 Alicia Aylies.
- For the first time since 2004, the contestants wore gowns in the last part of the night with all the contestants. It was inspired by Bal de la Rose in Monaco.
- Announcement of the 12 semi-finalists (for the first time in long gown instead of swimsuit). Each contestant had to do a quick introduction.
- Swimsuit segment, inspired by Coachella Valley Music and Arts Festival. This year, there were no evening gown competition with the 12 semi-finalists.
- Announcement of the 5 finalists.
- Fashion swimsuit show on the theme of "Fête des Fleurs" (flower festival). Iris Mittenaere appeared during this round, with an outfit representing an Iris.
- Evening gown competition. Question round, the questions were submitted by internauts.
- Crowning moment.

== Judges ==
Iris Mittenaere, Miss France 2016 and France's second Miss Universe, and fashion designer Jean-Paul Gaultier, were co-presidents of the panel of judges.

Member		Notes
Jean-Paul Gaultier	Jean-Paul Gaultier (co-president)	Fashion designer
Iris Mittenaere	Iris Mittenaere (co-president)	Miss France 2016 and Miss Universe 2016
Nolwenn Leroy	Nolwenn Leroy	Singer
	Agustín Galiana	Actor
	Anne Roumanoff	Humorist
Lorie	Lorie	Singer and actress
Vincent Clerc	Vincent Clerc	Rugby player

== Contestants ==
Region	Name	Age	Height	Hometown	Elected on	Placement at Miss France
Alsace	Joséphine Meisberger	20	170 cm (5 ft 7 in)	Colmar	3 September in Kembs	
Aquitaine	Cassandra Jullia	18	172 cm (5 ft 7 1/2 in)	Orthevielle	7 October in Anglet	5th Runner-Up
Auvergne	Marie-Anne Halbwachs	19	181 cm (5 ft 11 1/2 in)	Riom	16 September in Montluçon	
Burgundy	Mélanie Soares	22	172 cm (5 ft 7 1/2 in)	Nevers	17 September in Nevers	
Brittany	Caroline Lemée	24	177 cm (5 ft 9 1/2 in)	Rennes	29 September in Saint-Pol-de-Léon	
Centre-Loire Valley	Marie Thorin	20	177 cm (5 ft 9 1/2 in)	Mennetou-sur-Cher	20 October in Déols	
Champagne-Ardenne	Safiatou Guinot	19	170 cm (5 ft 7 in)	Reims	22 September in Charleville-Mézières	3rd Runner-Up
Corsica	Eva Colas	21	170 cm (5 ft 7 in)	Bastia	8 September in Porticcio	1st Runner-Up
Côte d'Azur	Julia Sidi Atman	21	179 cm (5 ft 10 1/2 in)	Cannes	31 July in Vallauris	
Franche-Comté	Mathilde Klinguer	21	177 cm (5 ft 9 1/2 in)	Pont-de-Roide-Vermondans	22 October in Port-sur-Saône	
Guadeloupe	Johane Matignon	18	175 cm (5 ft 9 in)	Saint-François	22 July in Le Gosier	
French Guiana	Ruth Briquet	24	173 cm (5 ft 8 in)	Cayenne	28 October in Cayenne	6th Runner-Up
Île-de-France	Lison DiMartino	18	172 cm (5 ft 7 1/2 in)	La Houssaye-en-Brie	19 October in Provins	2nd Runner-Up
Languedoc-Roussillon	Alizée Rieu	20	173 cm (5 ft 8 in)	Vallabrix	5 August in Vias	Top 12
Limousin	Anaïs Berthomier	19	171 cm (5 ft 7 1/2 in)	Couzeix	15 September in Limoges	Top 12
Lorraine	Cloé Cirelli	20	172 cm (5 ft 7 1/2 in)	Amanvillers	2 September in Épinal	
Martinique	Laure-Anaïs Abidal	21	174 cm (5 ft 8 1/2 in)	Fort-de-France	21 July in Fort-de-France	Top 12
Mayotte	Vanylle Émasse	20	170 cm (5 ft 7 in)	Majicavo Lamir	25 August in Pamandzi	
Midi-Pyrénées	Anaïs Dufillo-Medellel	18	170 cm (5 ft 7 in)	Auch	6 October in Bruguières	
Nord-Pas-de-Calais	Maëva Coucke	23	176 cm (5 ft 9 1/2 in)	Ferques	23 September in Orchies	Winner
Normandy	Alexane Dubourg	20	170 cm (5 ft 7 in)	Cairon	13 October in Tinchebray-Bocage	
New Caledonia	Levina Napoléon	18	171 cm (5 ft 7 1/2 in)	Pouembout	19 August in Païta	
Pays de Loire	Chloé Guémard	20	175 cm (5 ft 9 in)	Olonne-sur-Mer	30 September in Gorron	
Picardy	Paoulina Prylutska	18	170 cm (5 ft 7 in)	Compiègne	15 October in Beauvais	
Poitou-Charentes	Ophélie Forgit	19	171 cm (5 ft 7 1/2 in)	Arvert	8 October in La Rochelle	
Provence	Kleofina Pnishi	22	170 cm (5 ft 7 in)	Peyrolles-en-Provence	29 July in Cogolin	Top 12
Reunion	Audrey Chane Pao Kan	19	171 cm (5 ft 7 1/2 in)	Saint-Joseph	26 August in Saint-Denis	4th Runner-Up
Rhône-Alpes	Dalida Benaoudia	24	178 cm (5 ft 10 in)	Lyon	21 October in Bourg-en-Bresse	Top 12
Saint Pierre and Miquelon	Héloïse Urtizbéréa	18	180 cm (5 ft 11 in)	Saint-Pierre	7 July in Saint-Pierre	
Tahiti	Turouru Temorere	21	170 cm (5 ft 7 in)	Arue	23 June in Papeete	

== Placements ==
=== First round ===
A jury composed of partners (internal and external) of the company Miss France pre-selects 12 young women, during an interview that took place on 13 December.

=== Second round ===
The 50% jury and the 50% public choose the five candidates who can still be elected. A ranking ofrom 1 to 12 is established for each of the two parties.

Classement des finalistes par points :

Miss	Public	Jury	Total
Île-de-France	10	12	22
Nord-Pas-de-Calais	12	9	21
Reunion Island	9	11	20
Champagne-Ardenne	8	11	19
Corsica	11	4	15
Aquitaine	5	9	14
French Guiana	7	4	11
Languedoc-Roussillon	4	6	10
Martinique	6	4	10
Provence	2	7	9
Limousin	3	6	9
Rhône-Alpes	1	4	5

=== Last round ===
Only the audience can choose the winner and her runners-up by voting.

Contestant	Results
Nord-Pas-de-Calais	29.20%
Corsica	25.25%
Île-de-France	18.16%
Champagne-Ardenne	Not specified
Reunion Island	Not specified

== Special awards ==
Prize	Contestant
General Culture Award	Corsica – Eva Colas (18/20)
Elegance Award	Franche-Comté – Mathilde Klinguer
Best in Swimsuit Award	Midi-Pyrénées – Anaïs Dufillo-Medellel
Best Regional Costume Award	Lorraine – Cloé Cirelli (designer : Maël Charton)
Miss Congeniality	Tahiti – Turouru Temorere
Miss Photogenic	Picardy – Paoulina Prylutska

== Notes ==
The median age was approximately 20 years old and the median height was 1.737 m (5 ft 8.4 in)

=== Ethnic origins ===
- Auvergne – Marie-Anne Halbwachs is of German origin.
- Burgundy - Mélanie Soares is of Portuguese origin.
- Champagne-Ardenne – Safiatou Guinot is of Ivorian descent through her father.
- Côte d'Azur – Julia Sidi Atman is of Algerian and Italian descent.
- Île-de-France – Lison DiMartino is of Italian and Sicilian descent through her father.
- New Caledonia – Levina Napoleon is of Polynesian, Swedish and Chinese origin from her mother's side, and Javanese and Melanesian origin from her father's side.
- Picardy – Paoulina Prylutska was born in Ukraine.
- Provence – Kleofina Pnishi was born in Kosovo.
- Reunion – Audrey Chane Pao Kan is of Chinese and Indian descent.
- Rhône-Alpes – Dalida Benaoudia is of Algerian descent.

=== Replacements ===
- Martinique – Jade Voltigeur, Miss Martinique, was disqualified due to a too big tattoo, which is against the rules of the pageant. Her first runner-up, Laura-Anaïs Abidal, took over the title.

=== Notes on the placements ===
- The region Nord-Pas-de-Calais wins its third crown of Miss France, in only four years.
- The region Aquitaine is placed for the fourth consecutive year.
- The Reunion Island is placed for the third consecutive year.
- The regions Île-de-France, French Guiana and Languedoc-Roussillon are placed for the second consecutive year.
- The regions Martinique, Nord-Pas-de-Calais, Provence and Rhône-Alpes are placed for the first time since Miss France 2016.
- The region Champagne-Ardenne is placed for the first time since Miss France 2013. The region is also reaching its highest achievement while being third runner-up (they only made the top 5 once previously, with Christine Grégoire who was fourth runner-up in 1984).
- The region Corsica is placed for the first time since Miss France 2011.
- The region Limousin is placed for the first time since Miss France 2010.
