= Miss Nord-Pas-de-Calais =

French beauty contest

- Type: Beauty pageant
- Headquarters: Nord-Pas-de-Calais, France
- Members: Miss France
- Official language: French
- Regional director: Anne-Sophie Sevrette
- Website: www.missnordpasdecalaisorganisation.fr

Miss Nord-Pas-de-Calais is a French beauty pageant which selects a representative for the Miss France national competition from the region of Nord-Pas-de-Calais. Women representing the region under various different titles have competed at Miss France since 1920, although the Miss Nord-Pas-de-Calais title was not used regularly until 2010.

The current Miss Nord-Pas-de-Calais is Shana Mendes, who was crowned Miss Nord-Pas-de-Calais 2026 on 26 September 2026. At Miss France 2025 on 14 December 2024, she placed as first runner-up. Four women from Nord-Pas-de-Calais have been crowned Miss France:

- Camille Cerf, who was crowned Miss France 2015
- Iris Mittenaere, who was crowned Miss France 2016
- Maëva Coucke, who was crowned Miss France 2018
- Eve Gilles, who was crowned Miss France 2024

== Results summary ==
- Miss France: Camille Cerf (2014); Iris Mittenaere (2015); Maëva Coucke (2017); Eve Gilles (2023)
- 1st Runner-Up: Catherine Pouchele (1976; Miss Flanders); Catherine Clarysse (1990; Miss Littoral-Nord); Hélène Lantoine (1994; Miss Flanders); Caroline Cléry (1995; Miss Flanders); Agathe Cauet (2022); Sabah Aïb (2025)
- 2nd Runner-Up: Dany Coutelier (1972; Miss Flanders); Sylvie Wadoux (1981; Miss Côte d'Opale); Nancy Delettrez (1995; Miss Côte d'Opale); Vanessa Agez (1998; Miss Flanders); Aurélie Tuil (2003; Miss Flanders); Sophie Garénaux (2012)
- 3rd Runner-Up: Nadia Kouhen (1973; Miss Flanders); Emmanuelle Jagodsinski (2001; Miss Artois-Hainaut)
- 4th Runner-Up: Marie-Caroline Delcroix (1975; Miss Côte d'Opale); Caroline Charles (1985; Miss Côte d'Opale); Caroline Charles (1986; Miss Lille-Métropole); Anne Houzé (1997; Miss Hainaut); Élise Duboquet (2000; Miss Flanders); Lætitia Marciniak (2003; Miss Artois-Hainaut)
- 5th Runner-Up: Brigitte Maréchal (1978; Miss Côte d'Opale)
- 6th Runner-Up: Patricia Hérin (1978; Miss Flanders); Catherine Dupuy (1979; Miss Côte d'Opale); France Willemyns (2004; Miss Flanders)
- Top 12/Top 15: Nathalie Pallardy (1986; Miss Flanders); Nathalie Thibaud (1988; Miss Flanders); Valérie Masquelier (1989; Miss Littoral-Nord); Marjorie Eloy (1991; Miss Littoral-Nord); Charlotte Verpraet (1995; Miss Hainaut); Caroline Lubrez (1996; Miss Hainaut); Jessica Dherbometz (2002; Miss Flanders); Lydie Tison (2002; Miss Artois-Hainaut); Juliette Andry (2005; Miss Flanders); Annabelle Varane (2018); Donatella Meden (2021)

== Gallery ==
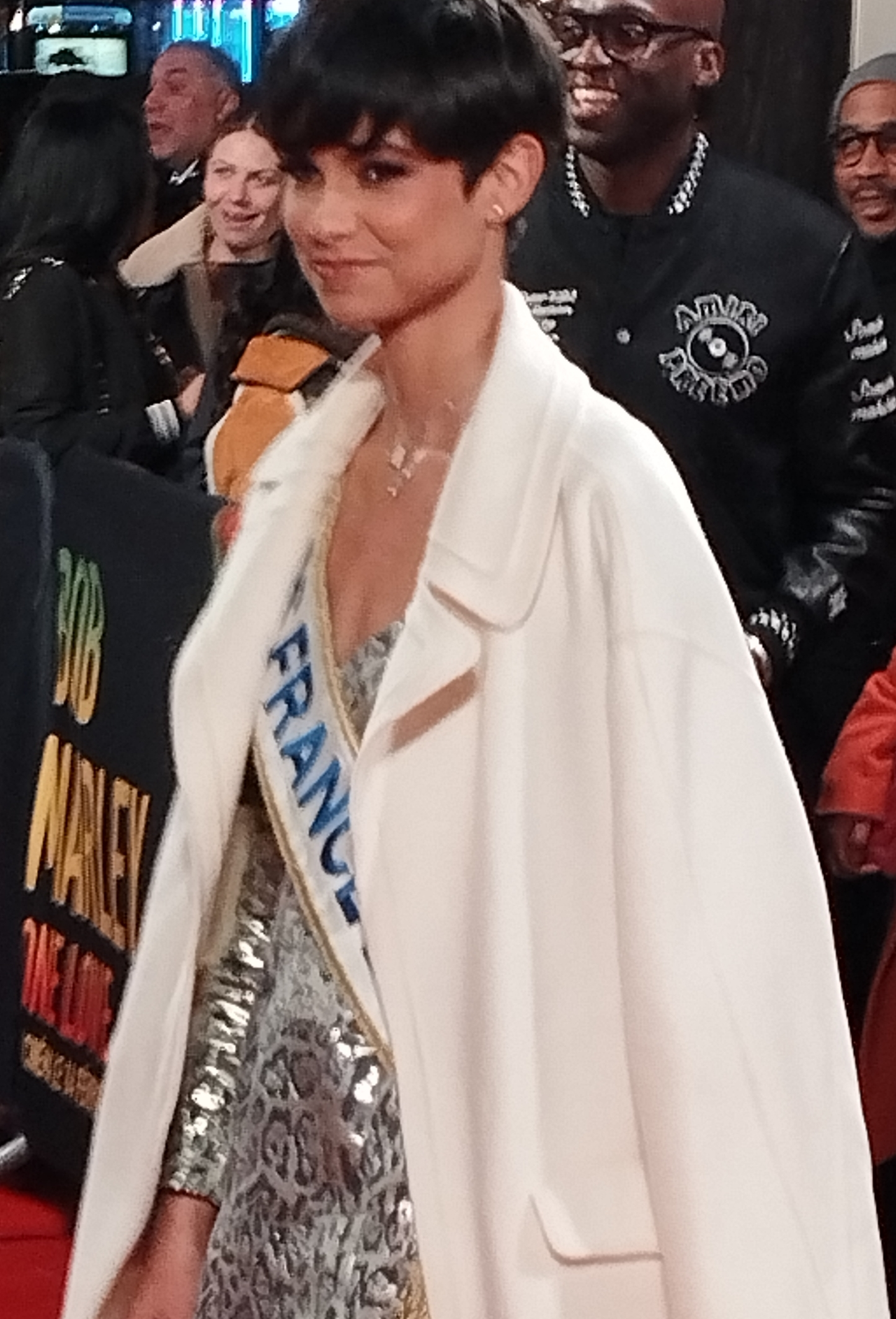
Miss Nord-Pas-de-Calais 2023 and Miss France 2024
Eve Gilles

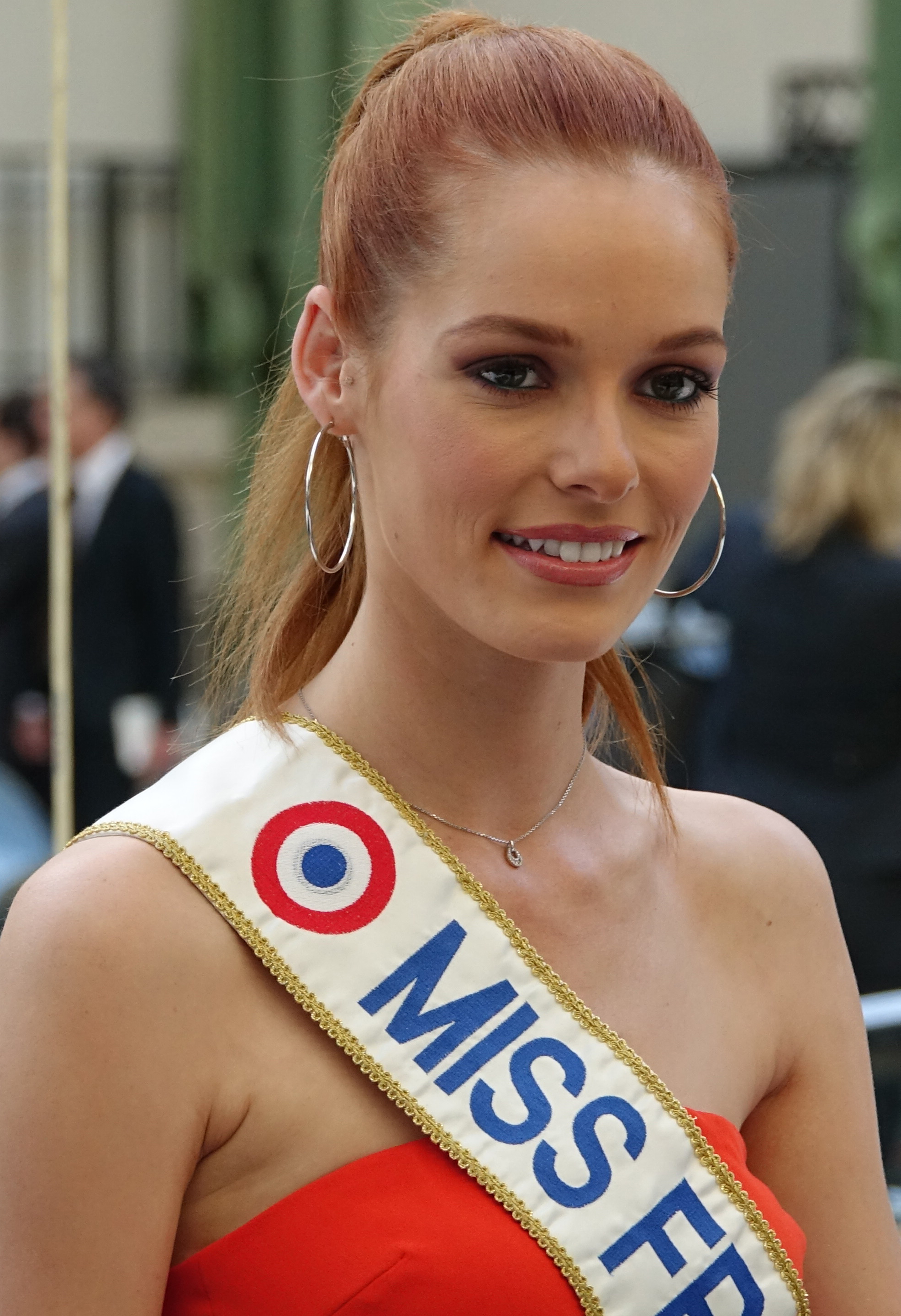
Miss Nord-Pas-de-Calais 2017 and Miss France 2018
Maëva Coucke

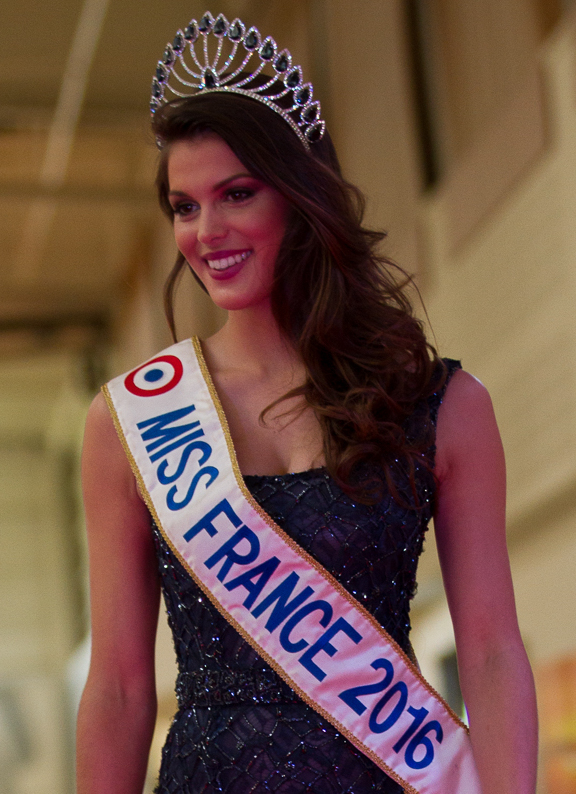
Miss Nord-Pas-de-Calais 2015, Miss France 2016, and Miss Universe 2016
Iris Mittenaere

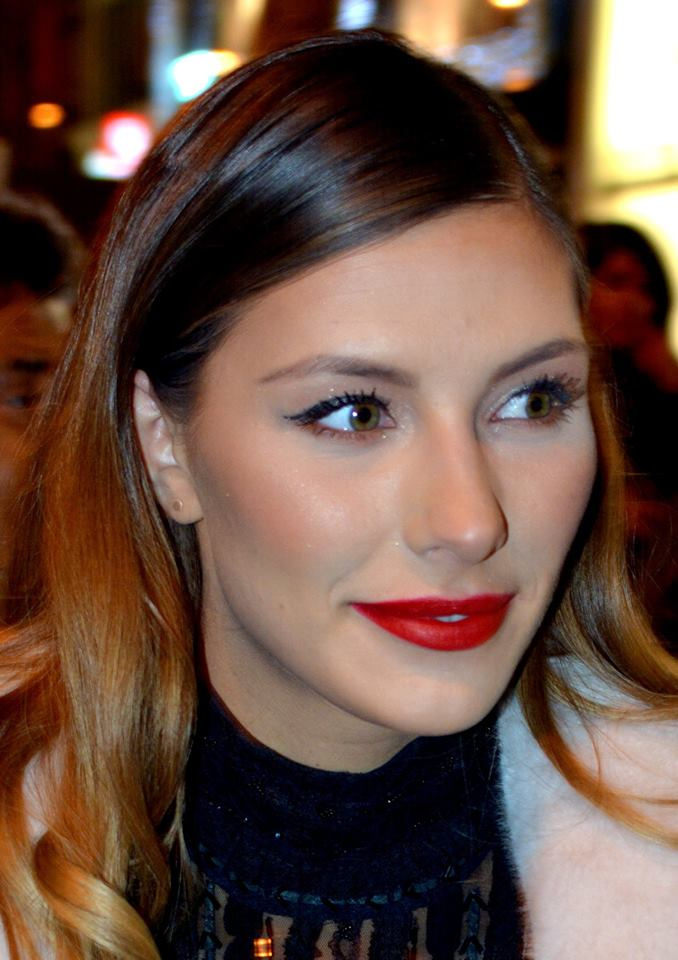
Miss Nord-Pas-de-Calais 2014 and Miss France 2015
Camille Cerf

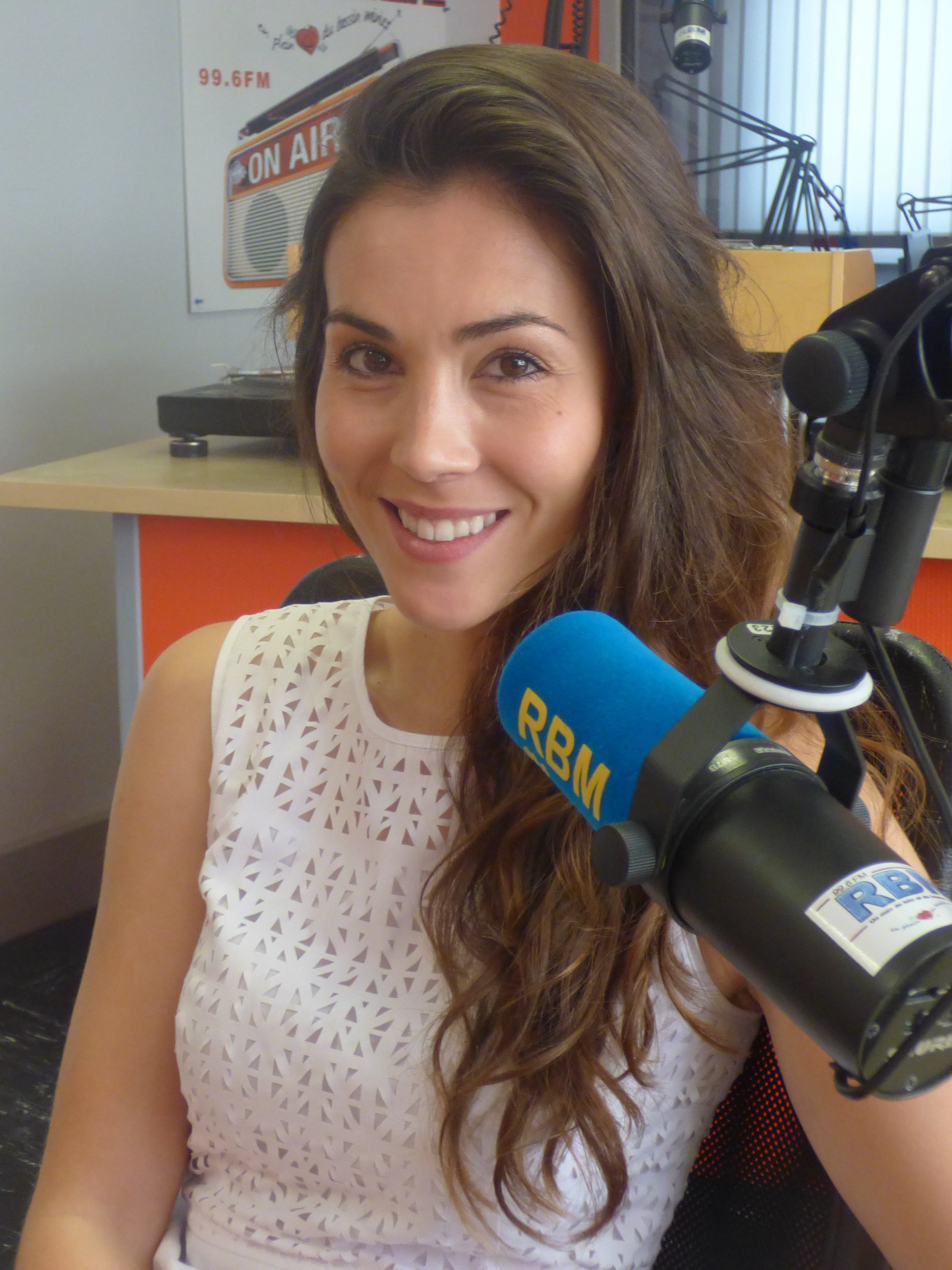
Miss Nord-Pas-de-Calais 2012
Sophie Garénaux

== Titleholders ==
| Year | Name | Age (Note: Ages at the time of Miss France) | Height | Hometown | Miss France placement | Notes |
|---|---|---|---|---|---|---|
| 2026 | Shana Mendes | 18 | 1.75 m (5 ft 9 in) | Hem | TBD | |
| 2025 | Lola Lacheré | 21 | 1.74 m (5 ft 8 1/2 in) | Berck | | |
| 2024 | Sabah Aïb | 18 | 1.73 m (5 ft 8 in) | Valenciennes | 1st Runner-Up | |
| 2023 | Eve Gilles | 20 | 1.71 m (5 ft 7 1/2 in) | Quaëdypre | Miss France 2024 | Top 30 at Miss Universe 2025 1st Runner-Up at Miss Supranational 2026 |
| 2022 | Agathe Cauet | 24 | 1.79 m (5 ft 10 1/2 in) | Lille | 1st Runner-Up | Competed at Miss World 2025 |
| 2021 | Donatella Meden | 20 | 1.74 m (5 ft 8 1/2 in) | Lambersart | Top 15 | |
| 2020 | Laura Cornillot | 24 | 1.78 m (5 ft 10 in) | Ennevelin | | |
| 2019 | Florentine Somers | 19 | 1.79 m (5 ft 10 1/2 in) | Loon-Plage | | |
| 2018 | Annabelle Varane | 19 | 1.81 m (5 ft 11 1/2 in) | Hellemmes-Lille | Top 12 | Varane is the sister of Raphaël Varane. |
| 2017 | Maëva Coucke | 23 | 1.76 m (5 ft 9 1/2 in) | Ferques | Miss France 2018 | Top 12 at Miss World 2018 Top 10 at Miss Universe 2019 |
| 2016 | Laurine Maricau | 22 | 1.70 m (5 ft 7 in) | Wavrin | | |
| 2015 | Iris Mittenaere | 22 | 1.72 m (5 ft 7 1/2 in) | Steenvoorde | Miss France 2016 | Miss Universe 2016 |
| 2014 | Camille Cerf | 19 | 1.80 m (5 ft 11 in) | Coulogne | Miss France 2015 | Top 15 at Miss Universe 2014 |
| 2013 | Gaëlle Mans | 23 | 1.80 m (5 ft 11 in) | Sains-en-Gohelle | | |
| 2012 | Sophie Garénaux | 22 | 1.72 m (5 ft 7 1/2 in) | Harnes | 2nd Runner-Up | Top 16 at Miss Earth 2013 |
| 2011 | Sophie Martin | 21 | 1.73 m (5 ft 8 in) | Douai | | |
| 2010 | Angeline Lagache | 22 | 1.73 m (5 ft 8 in) | Barlin | | |
| 1962 | Renée Bordés | 15 | 1.70 m (5 ft 7 in) | | Did not compete | Bordés was disqualified from competing in Miss France after claiming to be 16, when she was actually 15. |
| 1920 | Francine Bourdrez | | | | | |

=== Miss Artois ===
In 1979 and from 1991 to 1994, the department of Pas-de-Calais competed separately under the title Miss Artois, in reference to the historical province in which the department consists of.

| Year | Name | Age | Height | Hometown | Miss France placement | Notes |
|---|---|---|---|---|---|---|
| 1994 | Myriam Lalisse | | | Arras | | |
| 1993 | Juliette Fernowska | | | | | |
| 1992 | Béatrice Lisse | 22 | | Lens | | |
| 1991 | Magalie Ratajczak | | | | | |
| 1979 | Nicole Gressier | | | | | |

=== Miss Artois-Côte d'Opale ===
In 1996 and 1997, the department of Pas-de-Calais competed separately under the title Miss Artois-Côte d'Opale.

| Year | Name | Age | Height | Hometown | Miss France placement | Notes |
|---|---|---|---|---|---|---|
| 1997 | Émilie Dhorne | 19 | 1.74 m (5 ft 8 1/2 in) | | | |
| 1996 | Virginie Tellier | | | | | |

=== Miss Artois-Hainaut ===
From 1999 to 2009, the region crowned a representative under the title Miss Artois-Hainaut.

| Year | Name | Age | Height | Hometown | Miss France placement | Notes |
|---|---|---|---|---|---|---|
| 2009 | Astrid Ponchel | 21 | 1.79 m (5 ft 10 1/2 in) | Maubeuge | | |
| 2008 | Anne-Sophie Sevrette | 20 | 1.79 m (5 ft 10 1/2 in) | Liévin | | |
| 2007 | Alexandra Chiacchia | 20 | 1.80 m (5 ft 11 in) | Rombies-et-Marchipont | | |
| 2006 | Élodie Prudhomme | 21 | 1.76 m (5 ft 9 1/2 in) | Escaudain | | |
| 2005 | Audrey Stouder | 20 | 1.78 m (5 ft 10 in) | Bruille-Saint-Amand | | Stoude is the sister of Aurore Stouder, Miss Artois-Hainaut 2000. |
| 2004 | Jennifer Carluer | 18 | 1.74 m (5 ft 8 1/2 in) | Béthune | | |
| 2003 | Lætitia Marciniak | 22 | | Hénin-Beaumont | 4th Runner-Up | Competed at Miss World 2004 |
| 2002 | Lydie Tison | | | Caudry | Top 12 | |
| 2001 | Emmanuelle Jagodsinski | | | Lens | 3rd Runner-Up | 1st Runner-Up at Miss International 2002 |
| 2000 | Aurore Stoude | | | Bruille-Saint-Amand | | Stoude is the sister of Audrey Stouder, Miss Artois-Hainaut 2005. |
| 1999 | Sophie Andry | 20 | 1.80 m (5 ft 11 in) | Béthune | | |

=== Miss Côte d'Opale ===
From 1973 to 1995, the region crowned a representative under the title Miss Côte d'Opale.

| Year | Name | Age | Height | Hometown | Miss France placement | Notes |
|---|---|---|---|---|---|---|
| 1995 | Nancy Delettrez | | | Bailleul | 2nd Runner-Up | Competed at Miss International 1996 |
| 1994 | Virginie Lesaffre | | | Comines | | |
| 1993 | Stéphanie Dombrowski | | | | | |
| 1992 | Betty Lelard | 19 | | | | |
| 1991 | Sophie Lefebvre | | | | | |
| 1990 | Sybille Lhoste | | | | | |
| 1989 | Karine Baily | | | | | |
| 1988 | Lætitia Bouclet | 19 | 1.73 m (5 ft 8 in) | | | |
| 1987 | Karen Detrez | | | | | Detrez was also crowned Miss Lille-Métropole 1985 and Miss Littoral-Nord 1986. |
| 1986 | Isabelle Vanbelle | | | | | |
| 1985 | Caroline Charles | | | | 4th Runner-Up | Charles was also crowned Miss Lille-Métropole 1986. |
| 1984 | Sylvie Braye | | | | | |
| 1983 | Virginie Louasse | | | | | |
| 1982 | Muriel Taminiaux | | | | | |
| 1981 | Sylvie Wadoux | | | | 2nd Runner-Up | |
| 1980 | Aude Scandel | | | | | |
| 1979 | Catherine Dupuy | | | | 6th Runner-Up | Dupuy was also crowned Miss Littoral-Nord 1978. |
| 1978 | Brigitte Maréchal | | | | 5th Runner-Up | |
| 1977 | Djamila Bouchafa | | | | | |
| 1976 | Michèle Hennequin | | | | | |
| 1975 | Marie-Caroline Delcroix | | | | 4th Runner-Up | |
| 1974 | Sabine Briche | | | | | |
| 1973 | Marie-France Carasco | | | | | |

=== Miss Flanders ===
From the 1970s to 2000s, the department of Nord competed separately under the title Miss Flanders (1972–2009: French: Miss Flandre; 1970: French: Miss Flandres). This title is in reference to the historical province the makes up part of the present-day department.

| Year | Name | Age | Height | Hometown | Miss France placement | Notes |
|---|---|---|---|---|---|---|
| 2009 | Aline Bourgeois | 20 | 1.75 m (5 ft 9 in) | Roubaix | | |
| 2008 | Éméné Nyamé | 19 | 1.82 m (5 ft 11 1/2 in) | Roubaix | | |
| 2007 | Élise Logie | 22 | 1.75 m (5 ft 9 in) | Le Quesnoy | | |
| 2006 | Justine Bedel | 20 | 1.73 m (5 ft 8 in) | Dunkirk | | |
| 2005 | Juliette Andry | 22 | 1.75 m (5 ft 9 in) | Lille | Top 12 | |
| 2004 | France Willemyns | 21 | 1.79 m (5 ft 10 1/2 in) | Roncq | Top 12 (6th Runner-Up) | |
| 2003 | Aurélie Tuil | 19 | 1.78 m (5 ft 10 in) | | 2nd Runner-Up | |
| 2002 | Jessica Dherbometz | | | | Top 12 | |
| 2001 | Gwenaëlle Leloet | | | | | |
| 2000 | Élise Duboquet | | | Tourcoing | 4th Runner-Up | |
| 1999 | Aurélie Pauchet | 19 | 1.76 m (5 ft 9 1/2 in) | Auchy-les-Mines | | |
| 1998 | Vanessa Agez | 18 | 1.76 m (5 ft 9 1/2 in) | Gravelines | 2nd Runner-Up | Competed at Miss International 1999 |
| 1997 | Céline Cheuva | 21 | 1.72 m (5 ft 7 1/2 in) | | | |
| 1996 | Sarah Sumfleth | | | | | |
| 1995 | Caroline Cléry | | | Calais | 1st Runner-Up | |
| 1994 | Hélène Lantoine | 21 | | Étaples | 1st Runner-Up | Competed at Miss World 1995 |
| 1993 | Cathy Marais | | | Dunkirk | | |
| 1990 | Amélie Lefevere | | | | | |
| 1988 | Nathalie Thibaud | 21 | 1.77 m (5 ft 9 1/2 in) | | Top 12 | |
| 1987 | Marilyn Vecchioli | | | Marck | | |
| 1986 | Nathalie Pallardy | | | | Top 12 | Pallardy was also crowned Miss Paris 1988. |
| 1985 | Fabienne Decoster | | | | | |
| 1979 | Corinne Spebrouck | | | | | Two Miss Flanders titleholders competed: Spebrouck as Miss Flanders 1980, and Houtequi as Miss Flanders 1979. |
| 1979 | Jacqueline Houtequi | | | | | Two Miss Flanders titleholders competed: Spebrouck as Miss Flanders 1980, and Houtequi as Miss Flanders 1979. |
| 1978 | Patricia Hérin | | | | 6th Runner-Up | Hérin was also crowned Miss Littoral-Nord 1976. |
| 1977 | Annie Davenne | | | | | |
| 1976 | Catherine Pouchele | | | | 1st Runner-Up | |
| 1973 | Nadia Kouhen | | | | 3rd Runner-Up | |
| 1972 | Dany Coutelier | 17 | | Sebourg | 2nd Runner-Up | |
| 1970 | Doriane Chrétien | | | | | |

=== Miss Hainaut ===
From the 1995 to 1998, the department of Nord competed separately under the title Miss Hainaut. This title is in reference to the historical province the makes up part of the present-day department. This title is in reference to the historical province the makes up part of the present-day department.

| Year | Name | Age | Height | Hometown | Miss France placement | Notes |
|---|---|---|---|---|---|---|
| 1998 | Fleur Wiadereck | 20 | 1.72 m (5 ft 7 1/2 in) | | | |
| 1997 | Anne Houzé | 20 | 1.75 m (5 ft 9 in) | Cambrai | 4th Runner-Up | |
| 1996 | Caroline Lubrez | | | Beuvry-la-Forêt | Top 12 | |
| 1995 | Charlotte Verpraet | | | Valenciennes | Top 12 | |

=== Miss Lille ===
In 1961, 1978, and 1979, the department of Nord competed separately under the title Miss Lille. In 1976, 1977, 1985, and 1986, the department competed as Miss Lille-Métropole.

| Year | Name | Age | Height | Hometown | Miss France placement | Notes |
|---|---|---|---|---|---|---|
| 1986 | Caroline Charles | | | | 4th Runner-Up | Charles was also crowned Miss Côte d'Opale 1985. |
| 1985 | Karen Detrez | | | | | Detrez was also crowned Miss Littoral-Nord 1986 and Miss Côte d'Opale 1987. |
| 1979 | Astrid Fondu | | | | | |
| 1978 | Myriam Brunooghe | | | | | |
| 1977 | Fabienne Borreman | | | | | |
| 1976 | Leila Kassaba | | | | | |
| 1961 | Jeannine Heyte | | | | | |

=== Miss Littoral-Nord ===
From the 1970s to 1990s, the department of Nord competed separately under the title Miss Littoral-Nord.

| Year | Name | Age | Height | Hometown | Miss France placement | Notes |
|---|---|---|---|---|---|---|
| 1991 | Marjorie Eloy | | | Dunkirk | Top 12 | |
| 1990 | Catherine Clarysse | | | Dunkirk | 1st Runner-Up | 1st Runner-Up at Miss International 1991 |
| 1989 | Valérie Masquelier | | | | Top 12 | |
| 1987 | Virginie Penet | | | | | |
| 1986 | Karen Detrez | | | | | Detrez was also crowned Miss Lille-Métropole 1985 and Miss Côte d'Opale 1987. |
| 1985 | Catherine Baillie | | | | | |
| 1982 | Marie-Ange Calbet | | | | | |
| 1979 | Sylvie Penne | | | | | |
| 1978 | Catherine Dupuy | | | | | Dupuy was also crowned Miss Côte d'Opale 1979. |
| 1977 | Nicole Brulinski | | | | | |
| 1976 | Patricia Hérin | | | | | Hérin was also crowned Miss Flanders 1978. |

=== Miss Maubeuge ===
In 1976, the department of Nord competed separately under the title Miss Maubeuge.

| Year | Name | Age | Height | Hometown | Miss France placement | Notes |
|---|---|---|---|---|---|---|
| 1976 | Annie Dumouriez | | | | | |

=== Miss Métropole-Nord ===
In 1978, the department of Nord competed separately under the title Miss Métropole-Nord.

| Year | Name | Age | Height | Hometown | Miss France placement | Notes |
|---|---|---|---|---|---|---|
| 1978 | Christine Franchomme | | | | | |
