= Eva Colas =

French model and beauty pageant contestant (born 1996)

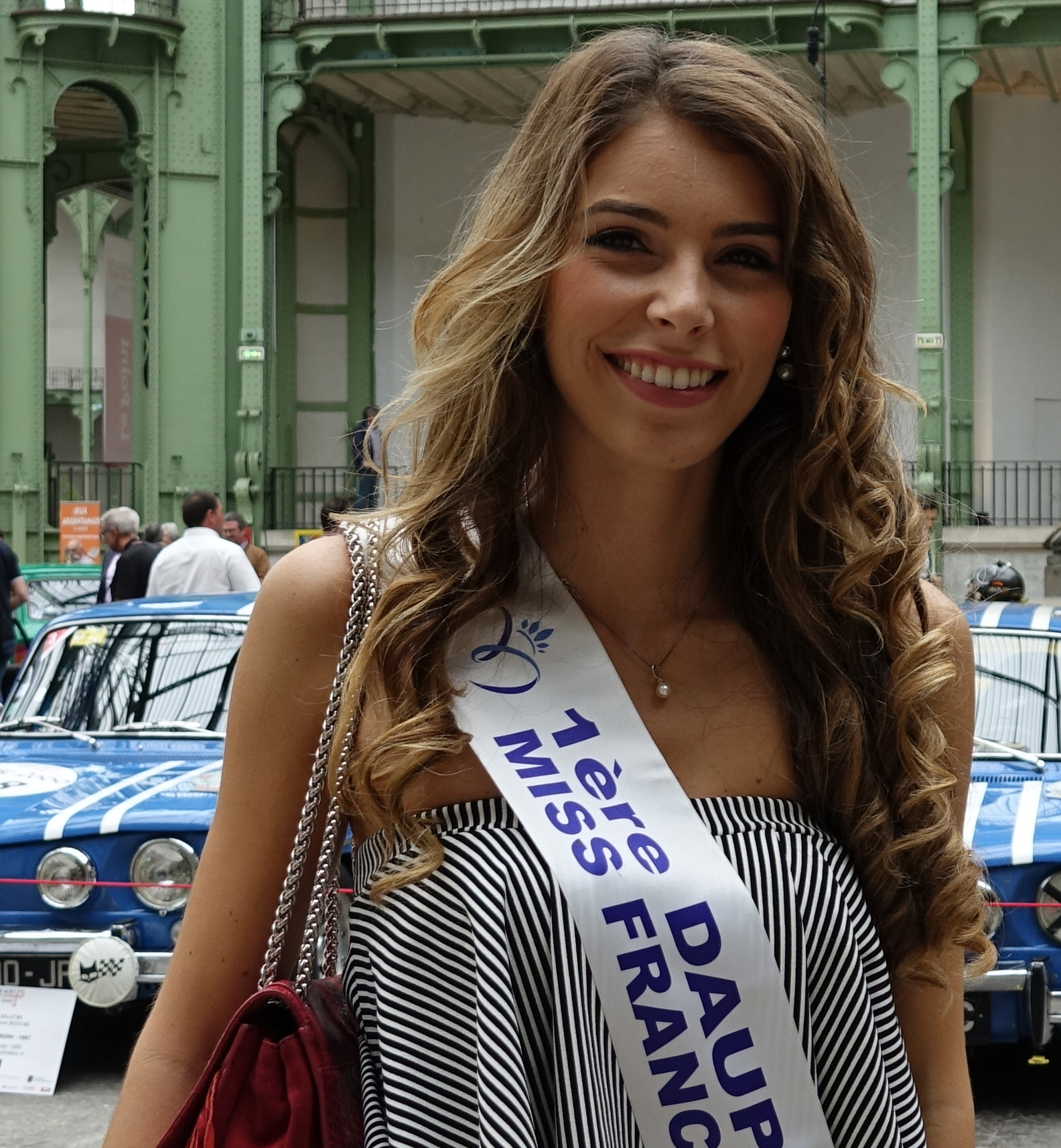
- Colas in 2018
- Born: 21 October 1996 (age 29); Bastia, France
- Education: Paris Dauphine University
- Height: 1.70 m (5 ft 7 in)
- Beauty pageant titleholder
- Title: Miss Corsica 2017; Miss Universe France 2018 (Note: Colas was appointed Miss Universe France by the Miss France Committee, as Maëva Coucke, the winner of Miss France 2018, was unable to compete in Miss Universe 2018 due to date conflicts with both Miss World 2018 and Miss France 2019.)
- Hair color: Brown
- Eye color: Brown
- Major competitions: Miss France 2018 (1st Runner-Up); Miss Universe 2018 (Unplaced)

Eva Colas (born 21 October 1996) is a French model and beauty pageant titleholder who was crowned Miss Corsica 2017 and Miss Universe France 2018. As Miss Corsica, Colas competed at Miss France 2018, where she placed as the first runner-up. Following the competition, Colas was appointed Miss Universe France 2018, and represented France at Miss Universe 2018.

== Early life and education ==
Colas was born on 21 October 1996 in Bastia on the island of Corsica. Growing up, Colas was an athletic child, and competed in equestrianism for 13 years. Colas attended Lycée Jeanne d'Arc in Bastia, graduating with her baccalauréat with honors in 2014. After completing her secondary education, Colas relocated to Paris to enroll in Paris Dauphine University, studying a bachelor's degree program in wealth management.

== Pageantry ==
=== Miss Corsica 2017 ===
Colas began her pageantry career in 2017, later being selected as a contestant for the Miss Corsica 2017 pageant. The competition was later held on 8 September 2017 in Porticcio, where Colas was ultimately crowned the winner. As Miss Corsica, Colas earned the right to represent the region at Miss France 2018.

Miss France was held on 16 December 2017 in Châteauroux. Colas competed in the finals, where she advanced to the top fifteen and later the top five. After reaching the top five, Colas was announced as the first runner-up behind winner Maëva Coucke. In the run-up to the competition, Colas also scored the highest on the General Culture Exam, a formal examination administered to the contestants covering topics such as history, politics, current events, and pop culture, having received a score of 18/20.

=== Miss Universe France 2018 ===
In September 2018, Colas was announced to have been appointed Miss Universe France 2018 by Sylvie Tellier and the Miss France Committee, receiving the right to represent the country at the Miss Universe 2018 competition. The choice was made as Coucke would be unable to compete, due to date conflicts with both Miss World 2018, where she was competing, and Miss France 2019, where she would be crowning her successor. This made Colas the first Corsican to represent France at Miss Universe. Miss Universe was held on 17 December 2018 in Bangkok, but Colas ultimately was not selected for the Top 20.

In January 2023, a clip of Colas introducing herself onstage at the preliminary competition for Miss Universe went viral on social media platforms such as TikTok and Twitter, with social media users comparing Colas's shout of "France!" to assorted animal vocalizations. Following the attention the clip received, Colas was impersonated by American actress and comedian Aubrey Plaza in an episode of Saturday Night Live, during a skit which parodied the clip.

== Notes ==
Awards and achievements
Preceded by (French Guiana) Alicia Aylies	Miss Universe France; 2018	Succeeded by (Nord-Pas-de-Calais) Maëva Coucke
Preceded by Laetitia Duclos	Miss Corsica; 2017	Succeeded by Manon Jean-Mistral
