= Kleofina Pnishi =

French actress and model

- Born: 23 July 1994 (age 32); Gjakova, FR Yugoslavia
- Occupations: Actress; model
- Height: 1.70 m (5 ft 7 in)
- Spouse: Benjamin Pavard (m. 2025)
- Beauty pageant titleholder
- Title: Miss Bouches-du-Rhône 2017; Miss Provence 2017
- Major competitions: Miss France 2018 (Top 12)

Kleofina Pnishi (born 23 July 1994) is a French actress, model, and beauty pageant titleholder. She was elected Miss Provence 2017 and placed in the top 12 at Miss France 2018.

== Biography ==
=== Early life and education ===
Pnishi was born in Gjakova, Kosovo. She has a younger brother and a younger sister. Her father is the head of a masonry company and her mother is a housewife. When Pnishi was five years old, her family fled Kosovo due to the Kosovo War and arrived in Peyrolles-en-Provence, France, in 1999.

She graduated from the School of Journalism and Communication of Aix-Marseille.

=== Career ===
==== Modeling ====
Pnishi was elected Miss Provence 2017 for Miss France 2018 on July 29, 2017, in Cogolin and succeeded Noémie Mazella, Miss Provence 2016.

==== Acting ====
In 2019, she participated in season 12 of Peking Express alongside Julia Sidi-Atman (Miss French Riviera 2017).

== Personal life ==
In July 2024, Pnishi became engaged to French footballer Benjamin Pavard, whom she eventually married in July 2025.

== Filmography ==
- 2019: The Brave (a.k.a. Lazarat)

== Television ==
- 2015: Plus belle la vie on TF1
- 2015: Le mystère du lac on TF1
- 2015: Meurtres au Mont Ventoux on France 3
- 2016: Petits secrets entre voisins on TF1
- 2019: Pékin Express: La Route des 50 volcans on M6
