= Michael Cinco =

Filipino fashion designer

- Logo of Michael Cinco fashion firm
- Born: August 27, 1971 (age 54); Catbalogan, Samar, Philippines
- Education: University of the Philippines Diliman; Central Saint Martins
- Occupation: Fashion designer
- Website: www.michaelcinco.com

Michael Cinco (Tagalog pronunciation: [ˈsiŋkɔ]; born August 8, 1971) is a Filipino fashion designer based in Dubai. He launched his eponymous fashion line in 2003.

== Early life and education ==
Cinco was born on August 27, 1971, in the island of Samar in central Philippines. His provincial upbringing made him fantasize the glamour of dressing up Marlene Dietrich, Grace Kelly, Joan Crawford and Audrey Hepburn, later saying "I pictured those fabulous heroines and imagined dressing them up in my creations. I chased after those visions..."

Cinco studied Fine Arts at the prestigious University of the Philippines Diliman for two years eventually transferring at Slims Fashion and Arts School in Manila. He then took up supplementary courses at Central Saint Martins in London.

== Career ==
In 1997, Cinco moved to Dubai, eventually establishing his fashion line in 2003. "Moving to the Middle East was a big leap for me, the region is a haven of couture," he recalls. In his first job in Dubai, he reinvented the image of a slightly staid fashion house, and succeeded in injecting new fashion nuances. Now, it’s great to know that the elite fashionistas of Dubai eventually recognized Michael Cinco's passion for fashion and design.

In 2002, Cinco went to Paris and then London where he trained at Central Saint Martins College of Arts and Design. The next year, he returned to Dubai and established his eponymous label, Michael Cinco.

The designer regularly finds inspiration in architectural features. For his 2017 Couture collection, he dedicated his Fall/Winter 2017 couture collection to the Palace of Versailles, referencing its baroque panelling and intricately painted ceilings.

Cinco is a member of the Miss Universe 2024 Selection committee.

== Notable clients ==
Cinco's clients include international celebrities like Beyonce, Rihanna, Lady Gaga, Nicki Minaj, Carrie Underwood, Kylie Minogue, Britney Spears, Christina Aguilera, Ellie Goulding, Nicole Scherzinger, Aishwarya Rai, Fergie Ferguson, Dita Von Teese, Brandy Norwood, Ashanti, Chris Brown, Tyra Banks and Naomi Campbell, among others.

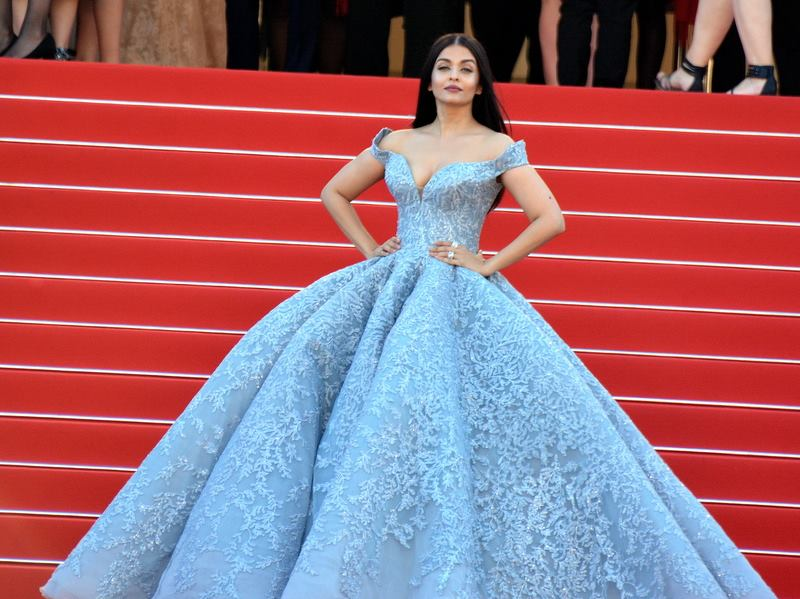
Aishwarya Rai wearing a Michael Cinco gown at the 70th Cannes Film Festival, 2017

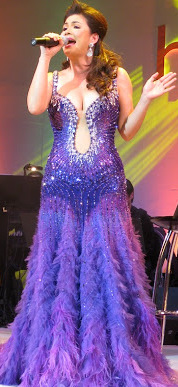
Regine Velasquez wearing a Michael Cinco gown at her Bench fragrance launch in SM Mall of Asia, 2009

Jennifer Lopez is a frequent wearer of Michael Cinco gowns, from her stage performances to red carpet appearances.

Sofia Vergara wore a black Michael Cinco gown at the 2013 Golden Globes. The same year Paloma Faith wore a Cinco dress while attending the Met Gala in New York.

Cinco dressed fellow Filipino and Miss Universe 2015 Pia Wurtzbach at the 2016 Miss Universe pageant held in Manila on January 30, 2017. He also designed Iris Mittenaere's farewell gown for the Miss Universe 2017 pageant held in Las Vegas later that same year.

At the 2017 Cannes Film Festival in France, Bollywood superstar Aishwarya Rai wore a blue gown designed by Cinco. The gown had gone viral among netizens, mainly Indian netizens, who named it 'Cinderella gown'.

Cinco designed the wedding gown of Austrian singer and Swarovski empire heiress Victoria Swarovski when she wed Werner Murz in June 2017 in Italy. The gown valued at over US$1 million and weighing 46 kilograms has an eight meter long train adorned by 500,000 of Swarovski's family-owned crystals. The bride also wore another Cinco creation, in red, at the wedding party.

Bollywood superstar Aishwarya Rai reprised her stellar black tie wardrobe with another couture gown by the designer at 2018 Cannes Film Festival.

On 19 June 2018, Miss World 2017 Manushi Chhillar wore a silver gown by the designer for the finale of Femina Miss India 2018, where she crowned her national successor.
