= Iris Mittenaere =

French beauty pageant winner

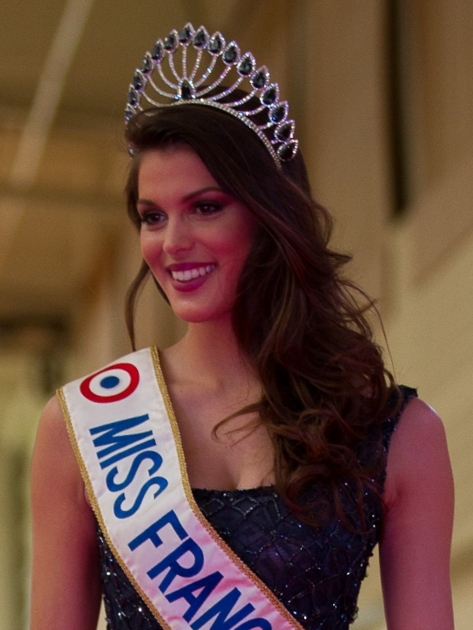
- Mittenaere in 2016
- Born: 25 January 1993 (age 33); Lille, France
- Education: University of Lille
- Occupations: Model; beauty pageant titleholder
- Height: 1.72 m (5 ft 7 1/2 in)
- Beauty pageant titleholder
- Title: Miss Flandre 2015; Miss Nord-Pas-de-Calais 2015; Miss France 2016; Miss Universe 2016
- Hair color: Brown
- Eye color: Brown
- Major competitions: Miss France 2016 (Winner); Miss Universe 2016 (Winner)

Iris Mittenaere (English: /aɪ.rɪs ˈmiːtɛnɑːr/ AI-rees MEE-tə-NAR; French: [iʁis mitənaʁ]; born 25 January 1993) is a French television personality, model and beauty pageant titleholder best known for winning the title of Miss Universe 2016. The second Miss Universe from France after Christiane Martel, Mittenaere had previously been crowned Miss France 2016 and Miss Nord-Pas-de-Calais 2015.

== Early life and education ==
Mittenaere was born on 25 January 1993 in Lille, to Yves Mittenaere, a middle school history and geography teacher, and Laurence Druart, a primary schoolteacher and museum guide. She has a brother, Baptiste, a sister, Cassandre, and a younger half-sister, Manon. Her parents divorced when she was three years old.

Mittenaere attended school in Steenvoorde, where she lived with her mother. In 2011, she graduated with honors from lycée with a focus on science. After graduating, she moved to Lille, where she attended Lille 2 University of Health and Law, studying dentistry.

Prior to becoming Miss France, Mittenaere was in her fifth year of a dental surgery fellowship and planned on becoming a dental surgeon after graduating.

== Pageantry ==
=== Miss France 2016 ===
After winning the local title of Miss Flandre 2015 on 2 May 2015 in Bailleul, Mittenaere entered the Miss Nord-Pas-de-Calais 2015 regional pageant in Orchies, which she won on 26 September 2015. Mittenaere initially only entered Miss Flandre after being contacted on Facebook by the contest organizers, due to there being a lack of candidates that applied. Mittenaere represented Nord-Pas-de-Calais at the Miss France 2016 pageant. On 19 December 2015, she was crowned Miss France by outgoing Miss France 2015 and former Miss Nord-Pas-de-Calais 2014 Camille Cerf in Lille. It was a back-to-back victory for the region.

As Miss France, Mittenaere promoted oral hygiene and launched an awareness campaign on oral health. She participated in oral hygiene awareness programs at French schools targeting young schoolchildren.

In November 2016, Mittenaere presented the Francophone Group of the Year Award at the NRJ Music Award in Cannes.

During her reign as Miss France 2016, Mittenaere traveled to China, Italy, Morocco, Germany, the Caribbean, and Ivory Coast.

=== Miss Universe 2016 ===
As Miss France, Mittenaere later competed in Miss Universe 2016. She was the only European delegate to progress to the semi-finals of the competition, later going on to win the title. Mittenaere became only the second woman from her country to win the crown after Christiane Martel won Miss Universe 1953. Mittenaere was additionally the first European winner since Oxana Fedorova of Russia, who was crowned Miss Universe 2002 but soon after dethroned, and the first European titleholder to complete her year as Miss Universe since Mona Grudt of Norway, who won Miss Universe 1990.

In the first part of the question-and-answer portion, Mittenaere called for open borders. She was asked the following by host Steve Harvey: "Given today's worldwide refugee crisis, do countries have an obligation to accept refugees or do they have a right to close their borders?" Mittenaere replied:

Throughout the world, people can choose to have borders open or close. In Europe, we have open borders. In France, we want to have the most globalisation that we can. We want to have the biggest exchange of people that we can. Maybe someday that will change, but now we have open borders.

According to one of the judges, Mickey Boardman, who wrote about his experience as a Miss Universe judge in The New York Times, "it was the question-and-answer portion that put her over the top. While the other contestants didn’t seem to actually answer the question about a mistake they had made in life and what they had learned from it, she was poised and well spoken". The top three contestants were asked the same final question by Harvey: "Name something over the course of your life that you failed at, and tell us what you learned from that experience?" and she replied:

I have failed several times in my life. I thought I had failed my first year in medical school because my name wasn't on the passing list. So, the very same day I went to buy a new set of medical books to keep on studying. I think when you fail, you need to stand up and keep going, we are all able to do so. If I don't win tonight, I will still keep on smiling tomorrow because I am proud to be part of the three finalists. I've learnt a lot from my failures and happily, I did end up passing my first year of medical school.

==== Reign ====
Mittenaere was crowned with the DIC Crown at the Miss Universe 2016 pageant. As a result of a lawsuit between IMG and Diamonds International Corporation (DIC), she wore the Diamond Nexus Crown from March 2017 until the end of her reign.

In her capacity as Miss Universe, she served as a judge at Puteri Indonesia in Jakarta, at Miss Egypt in Cairo at Miss Peru in Lima, at Miss Guyana held in New York City, and at Miss Diva in Mumbai.

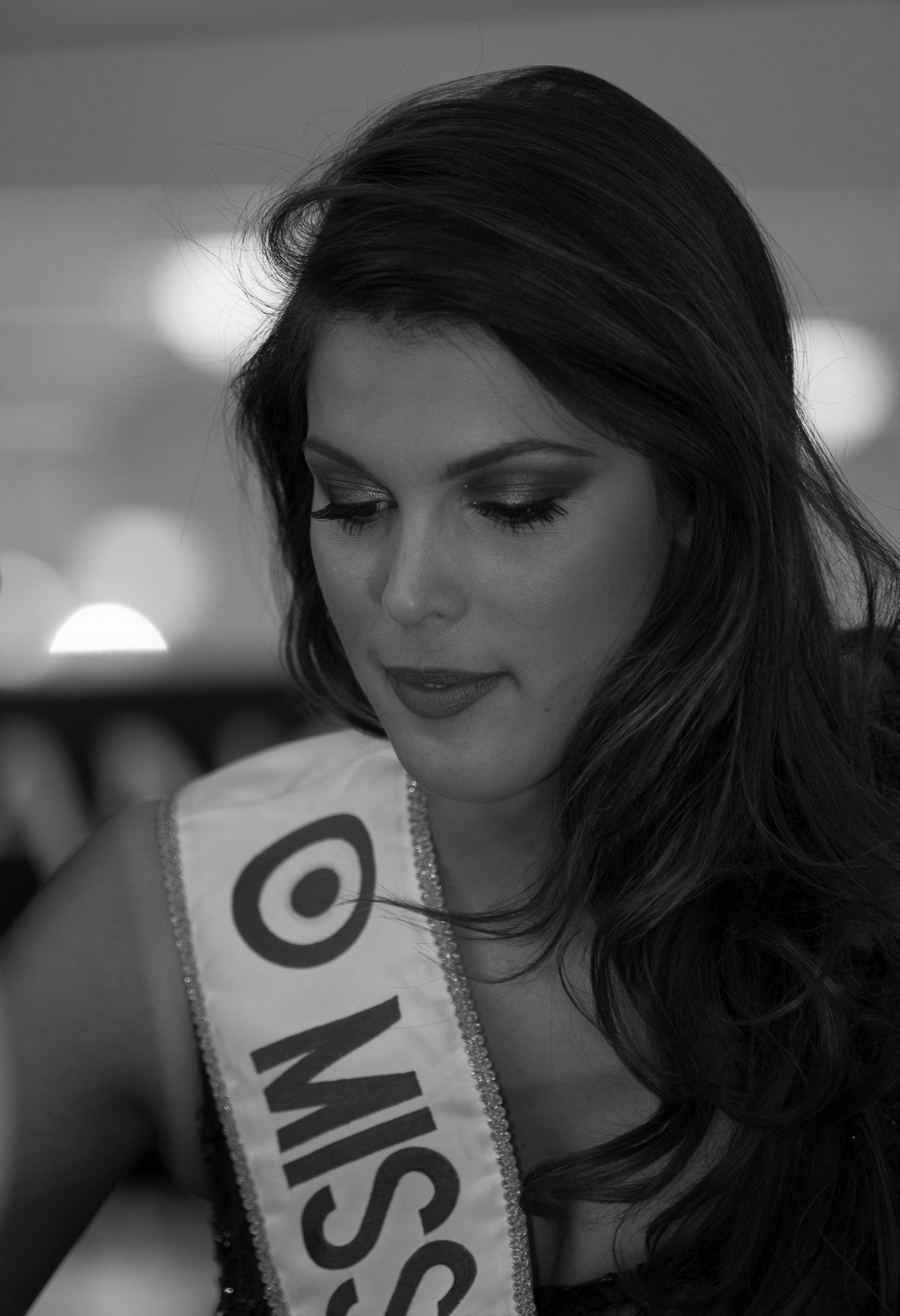
Mittenaere during Miss Burgundy 2016.

As a global ambassador, Mittenaere attended diplomatic events at the Embassy of France in Cairo, the Embassy of France in Manila, the Embassy of the United States, Manila, the Consulate general of France in New York, the Consulate general of France in Alexandria, and was invited to Emmanuel Macron's speech to the French expatriate community at the Kaufmann Concert Hall of 92Y in New York City. She traveled to Bali to shoot a commercial for C 1000, a vitamin brand available in Indonesia and attended Farouk Systems's Global Conference in Cancun.

As a charity ambassador for Smile Train, she traveled to Mexico City and Cap-Haïtien to visit cleft lip and cleft palate patients and witnessed a cleft surgery first-hand. As the newest madrina of the Latino Commission on AIDS, she attended the annual fundraising Cielo Gala to benefit the commission and was also invited to Project Sunshine's 14th Annual Benefit Celebration Brighter Together in New York City.

At New York Fashion Week, she walked the runway for Sherri Hill in February and September 2017. In June 2017, she attended Joyrich x Snoop Dogg's Fashion show at MADE LA 2017 in Los Angeles and was invited to the AmfAR generationCURE Solstice 2017 in New York City.

In March 2017, during her week-long homecoming celebration in Paris and in her hometown of Lille, Mittenaere was invited by François Hollande, the president of France, to visit Élysée Palace and was given a regional award by Xavier Bertrand, the president of Hauts-de-France. Mittenaere also walked for Jean Paul Gaultier at Paris Fashion Week, attended the Palais des Festivals at the 2017 Cannes Film Festival and attended the AmFAR Charity Event, Cinema Against AIDS, in Cannes.

During her reign as Miss Universe, Mittenaere traveled to the Philippines, Indonesia, Haiti, the Cayman Islands, Ecuador, Mexico, Peru, India, and Egypt, in addition to numerous trips around the United States and France.

For her last walk as the reigning Miss Universe, Mittenaere wore a Michael Cinco scarlet red ombré Couture gown, in full Swarovski crystals, which featured a fitted bodice and flowing train, before passing on the crown to her successor Demi-Leigh Nel-Peters of South Africa as Miss Universe 2017 on 26 November 2017 at Planet Hollywood Las Vegas in Las Vegas, Nevada.

From 4 to 9 December 2017, she participated in the Miss Universe's Christmas Tour in the Philippines, alongside her successor Demi-Leigh Nel-Peters and predecessor Pia Wurtzbach, then served as co-president of the jury with Jean-Paul Gaultier at Miss France 2018, appearing on stage with the five finalists as a part of the fashion swimsuit portion of the competition and putting an end to her international pageant career.

In December 2017, a documentary film about her Miss Universe reign, produced by Endemol Shine Group and titled From Miss France to Miss Universe, the fabulous destiny of Iris, was broadcast on TF1 and watched by 5.4 million viewers in France. The camera crew followed Mittenaere's reign as Miss Universe, her humanitarian travel, her trips and homecoming in France, and her family's reaction to her new life.

== Post-Miss Universe ==
Iris Mittenaere began her television career in 2018, becoming a co-host of the French version of Ninja Warrior. In February 2018, Iris Mittenaere presented an award at the 2018 Victoires de la Musique, wearing designer Stéphane Rolland. In September 2018, Mittenaere began competing in the ninth season of Danse avec les stars, the French version of Dancing with the Stars. Her professional partner on the show was Anthony Colette, and together they placed second in the season's finale on 1 December 2018. From February 2019, she is the host of the Lottery Drawings and EuroMillions on TF1.

In March 2018, she was invited by the First Lady of Ivory Coast to attend the 7th Gala dinner of the Children of Africa Foundation, marking its 20th anniversary and the opening of a new hospital. She also participated to a Smile Train event, visiting families of cleft patients in Abidjan, Ivory Coast. Iris Mittenaere partnered with French Artist Philippe Shangti to create a photographic artwork titled "I'm Iris, I'm not a princess", sold 40,000 euros in June 2018 at an Auction for proceeds to Smile Train.

On 7 November 2018, Iris Mittenaere released her first autobiography titled in French Toujours y croire : Miss Univers, une jeune femme (pas) comme les autres which means Always believe in yourself: Miss Universe, a young woman (un)like any other. The book was published by HarperCollins. The book chronicles Mittenaere's origins in Northern France and her pageantry experience, in addition to beauty tutorials and advice for young women in order to build self-confidence. The same day, Mittenaere's Toujours y croire book tour launched, kicking off in her hometown of Lille. Other cities include Paris, Lyon, Toulouse, Bordeaux, Cannes, Dunkirk, Reims, Nantes in France, Brussels in Belgium and Geneva in Switzerland.

On 3 February 2019 Iris Mittenaere was on the judging panel of Top Model Belgium 2019 at Le Lido. From 12 to 17 February 2019 she was the guest star in Jean-Paul Gaultier's Fashion Freak Show at the Folies Bergère. She is Morgan's brand ambassador for 2019. On 20 April 2019 she was the face of Casa Fashion show's 14th edition, "The future is female", in Casablanca, Morocco. From May 2019 to January 2020, she is a vedette in choreographer Kamel Ouali's L' Oiseau Paradis new revue at the Paradis Latin. On 22 May 2019 Iris Mittenaere climbed the steps of the Palais des Festivals at the 2019 Cannes Film Festival in a couture light pink crystallized ballgown designed by Michael Cinco. She also attended de Grisogono Host Gala Dinner, wearing a bejewelled blue one-shoulder gown, designed by Lebanese Ziad Nakad, which was adorned in gems and sequins.

In the summer 2019 issue of Forbes France, Mittenaere was interviewed and named among France's top five digital influencers of 2019.

In June 2022, Mittenaere was guest judge on the first episode of Drag Race France with the French fashion designer Jean Paul Gaultier.

== Personal life ==
In August 2022, Mittenaere announced her engagement to French-Moroccan businessman Diego El Glaoui, with whom she had been in a relationship for three years.

In 2024, after Mittenaere's breakup with El Glaoui, she dated 22-year-old boyfriend Bruno Pelat, grandson of Roger-Patrice Pelat. In September, she filed a digital complaint of domestic violence and drug use against Pelat. He was sentenced to 12 months imprisonment, to two-year probationary suspension and fined €2,000 in damages.

In the spring of 2025 she was reported to be in a relationship with French rugby star Antoine Dupont.

Awards and achievements
Preceded by (Philippines) Pia Wurtzbach	Miss Universe; 2016	Succeeded by (South Africa) Demi-Leigh Nel-Peters
Preceded by (Orléanais) Flora Coquerel	Miss Universe France; 2016	Succeeded by Alicia Aylies
Preceded by (Nord-Pas-de-Calais) Camille Cerf	Miss France; 2016	Succeeded by Alicia Aylies
Preceded by Camille Cerf	Miss Nord-Pas-de-Calais; 2015	Succeeded by Laurine Maricau
Preceded by Aline Bourgeois	Miss Flandre; 2015	Succeeded by Laurine Maricau
