= Camille Cerf =

Miss France 2015 titleholder (born 1994)

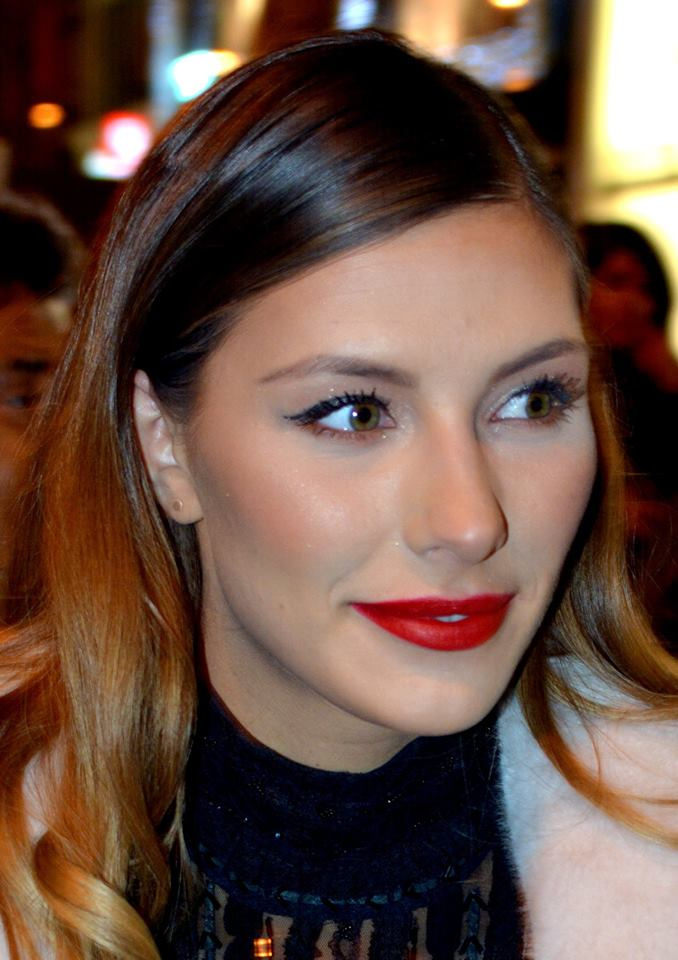
- Cerf in 2018
- Born: 9 December 1994 (age 31); Calais, France
- Height: 1.80 m (5 ft 11 in)
- Children: 1
- Beauty pageant titleholder
- Title: Miss Valenciennois 2014; Miss Nord-Pas-de-Calais 2014; Miss France 2015
- Years active: 2014–present
- Hair color: Blonde
- Eye color: Green
- Major competitions: Miss France 2015 (Winner); Miss Universe 2014 (Top 15)

Camille Cerf (French pronunciation: [kamij sɛʁf]; born 9 December 1994) is a French model and beauty pageant titleholder who was crowned Miss France 2015. Cerf had previously been crowned Miss Nord-Pas-de-Calais 2014, and was the first entrant representing Nord-Pas-de-Calais to win Miss France. She later represented France at Miss Universe 2014, where she placed in the top fifteen.

== Early life and education ==
Cerf was born in Calais in the Pas-de-Calais department of Nord-Pas-de-Calais, and grew up in the nearby town of Coulogne. She has a twin sister named Mathilde. Cerf was educated in the Calais area, ultimately graduating from Lycée Pierre-de-Coubertin in Calais. Prior to becoming Miss France, Cerf was a student at the EGC Business School in Lille, and wished to become a press secretary or communications director. She ultimately received her degree in 2017.

Cerf began her modeling career as a teenager, competing in the Elite Model Look competition at age 15. In the aftermath of the competition, she was signed to Elite Model Management and began working professionally as a model in France. In 2013, Cerf's father died of cancer, and she became an advocate for cancer awareness in his honor.

== Pageantry ==
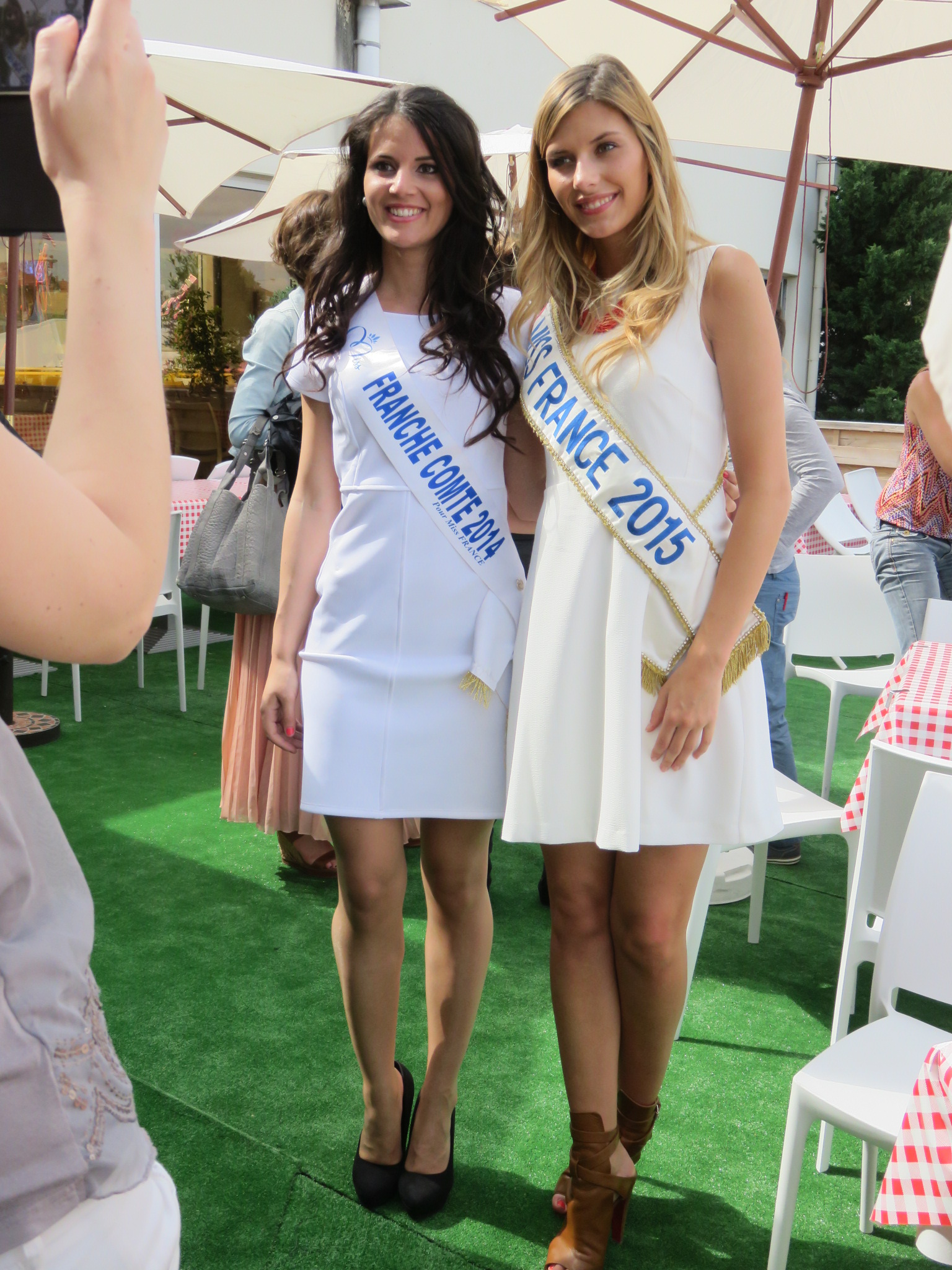
Cerf (right) as Miss France 2015

Cerf began her pageantry career after winning the Miss Valenciennois 2014 title, which qualified her to compete for Miss Nord-Pas-de-Calais 2014. She went on to win Miss Nord-Pas-de-Calais 2014 as well, becoming the region's representative for the Miss France 2015 competition. Miss France 2015 was held in December 2014 at the Zénith d'Orléans in Orléans. Cerf went on to advance from the initial pool of 33 contestants to the top 12 semifinalists, and later the top five finalists, before being declared the winner. With her win, she became the first entrant representing Nord-Pas-de-Calais to win Miss France.

Just over a month after winning Miss France, Cerf represented France at the Miss Universe 2014 competition in Miami. The decision was made to send Cerf rather than outgoing Miss France titleholder Flora Coquerel because Coquerel was expected to compete in Miss World 2014, and the schedules of the two pageants were expected to conflict. Despite going on to place in the top 15 at Miss Universe, Cerf later stated that she was afraid of winning the title, as she had only just begun her reign as Miss France and had noticed that outgoing Miss Universe titleholder Gabriela Isler did not seem happy with her year. Cerf also criticized the prevalence of Miss Universe contestants having received cosmetic surgery, believing it to be unfair to the competition. Cerf went on to complete her reign as Miss France in December 2015, crowning Iris Mittenaere as her successor at Miss France 2016.

In November 2025, it was announced that Cerf would serve as the godmother for the winner of Miss France 2026, in addition to serving in the jury for the competition. Hinaupoko Devèze of Tahiti went on to win, and Cerf will accompany her to various events and provide advice and guidance, in a similar role to those previously held by Sylvie Tellier and Cindy Fabre.

== Personal life ==
Cerf announced her first pregnancy in April 2023, and later gave birth to her son in August 2023.

Awards and achievements
Preceded by (French Polynesia) Hinarani de Longeaux	Miss Universe France; 2014	Succeeded by (Orléanais) Flora Coquerel
Preceded by (Orléanais) Flora Coquerel	Miss France; 2015	Succeeded by (Nord-Pas-de-Calais) Iris Mittenaere
Preceded by Gaëlle Mans	Miss Nord-Pas-de-Calais; 2014	Succeeded by Iris Mittenaere
Preceded by Alix Kortus	Miss Valenciennois; 2014	Succeeded by Cherryl Merbach
