= Miss France 2016 =

Beauty pageant edition

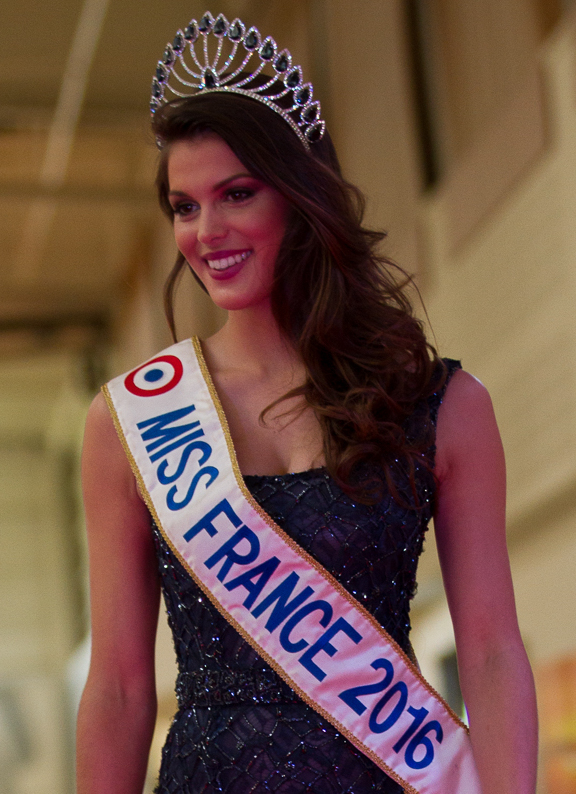
- Iris Mittenaere, Miss France 2016
- Date: 19 December 2015
- Presenters: Jean-Pierre Foucault
- Venue: Zénith de Lille, Lille, France
- Broadcaster: TF1
- Entrants: 31
- Placements: 12
- Debuts: Guadeloupe & Northern Islands, Centre − Loire Valley
- Withdrawals: Centre, Guadeloupe, Orléanais, Pays de Savoie, St. Martin.
- Returns: St-Pierre-et-Miquelon
- Winner: Iris Mittenaere; Nord-Pas-de-Calais
- Congeniality: Ramatou Radjabo; Mayotte
- Photogenic: Jade Vélon; Burgundy

Miss France 2016 was the 86th Miss France pageant, held in Lille on 19 December 2015. Miss France 2015, Camille Cerf crowned her successor Iris Mittenaere at the end of the event. This was the third back-to-back in Miss France history after 1948-1950 and 1989-1990. Mittenaere represented France at Miss Universe 2016, where she was crowned the winner.

The theme of the event was "the dream", it was presented by the national director Sylvie Tellier and Jean-Pierre Foucault for the 21st consecutive year. The event was broadcast live by TF1.

== Results ==
=== Placements ===
Placement	Contestant
Miss France 2016	Nord-Pas-de-Calais – Iris Mittenaere
1st Runner-Up	Martinique – Morgane Edvige
2nd Runner-Up	Tahiti – Vaimiti Teiefitu
3rd Runner-Up	Provence – Julia Courtès
4th Runner-Up	Réunion – Azuima Issa
Top 12	Aquitaine – Gennifer Demey (5th Runner-Up); Centre-Val de Loire – Margaux Bourdin (6th Runner-Up); Alsace – Laura Muller; Brittany – Léa Bizeul; Côte d'Azur – Léanna Ferrero; Languedoc – Lena Starchuski; Rhône-Alpes – Nora Bengrine

== Preparation ==
The 31 contestants, Camille Cerf and the national director Sylvie Tellier had travelled to French Polynesia from November, 22 to November, 29. The rehearsals took place in Lille.

=== Pageant ===
The theme of the 2016 event was "The Dream". The rounds centered around the dreams of former Miss France winners.

- Presentation round, group 1: Pirates (dream of Miss France 2011, Laury Thilleman)
- Presentation round, group 2: Animals (dream of Miss France 2012, Delphine Wespiser)
- Presentation round, group 3: Sports (dream of Miss France 2006, Alexandra Rosenfeld)
- Regional costumes: Toys (dream of Miss France 2014, Flora Coquerel)
- Swimwear: Superheroes (dream of Miss France 2013, Marine Lorphelin)
- Announcement of top 12
- Top 12 long gown: Divas (dream of Miss France 2009, Chloé Mortaud)
- Top 12 swimsuits: Christmas (dream of Miss France 2007, Rachel Legrain-Trapani)
- Announcement of top 5
- Top 5: Candy Shop (dream of Miss France 2008, Valérie Bègue)
- Top 5 long gown: Top Model (dream of Miss France 2010, Malika Ménard)

== Contestants ==
Region	Name	Age	Height	Hometown	Elected	Placement
Alsace	Laura Muller	19	171 cm (5 ft 7 1/2 in)	Sélestat	September, 6 in Richwiller	Semifinalist
Aquitaine	Gennifer Demey	23	171 cm (5 ft 7 1/2 in)	Lormont	October, 10 in Saint-Jean-d'Illac	5th runner-up
Auvergne	Pauline Bazoge	18	171 cm (5 ft 7 1/2 in)	La Chapelaude	June, 26 in Vichy	
Burgundy	Jade Vélon	21	175 cm (5 ft 9 in)	Mâcon	September, 20 in Autun	Miss Photogenic
Brittany	Léa Bizeul	19	175 cm (5 ft 9 in)	Saint-Malo	October, 3 in Saint-Pol-de-Léon	Semifinalist
Centre − Loire Valley	Margaux Bourdin	18	175 cm (5 ft 9 in)	Châteauneuf-en-Thymerais	September, 19 in Déols	6th runner-up Best Regional Costume
Champagne-Ardenne	Océane Pagenot	20	171 cm (5 ft 7 1/2 in)	Reims	September, 25 in Tinqueux	Prize of Elegance
Corsica	Jessica Garcia	21	170 cm (5 ft 7 in)	Furiani	September, 11 in Porticcio	
Côte d'Azur	Leanna Ferrero	20	172 cm (5 ft 7 1/2 in)	Cannes	August, 2 in Mougins	Semifinalist
Franche-Comté	Alizée Vannier	19	172 cm (5 ft 7 1/2 in)	Pelousey	October, 16 in Belfort	
French Guiana	Estelle Merlin	22	183 cm (6 ft 0 in)	Cayenne	October, 10 in Cayenne	
Guadeloupe & Northern Islands	Johanna Delphin	20	177 cm (5 ft 9 1/2 in)	Baie-Mahault	August, 29 in St. Martin	
Île-de-France	Fanny Harcaut	19	176 cm (5 ft 9 1/2 in)	Créteil	June, 23 in Paris	Best in swimsuit
Languedoc	Lena Stachurski	20	174 cm (5 ft 8 1/2 in)	Roquemaure	August, 1st in Carnon	Semifinalist
Limousin	Emma Bourroux	20	180 cm (5 ft 11 in)	Saint-Germain-les-Vergnes	September, 18 in Brive-la-Gaillarde	
Lorraine	Jessica Molle	19	170 cm (5 ft 7 in)	Corny-sur-Moselle	September, 5 in Vittel	
Martinique	Morgane Edvige	19	178 cm (5 ft 10 in)	Le François	September, 25 in Fort-de-France	1st runner-up
Mayotte	Ramatou Radjabo	18	170 cm (5 ft 7 in)	Chirongui	August, 29 in Pamandzi	Miss Congeniality
Midi-Pyrénées	Emily Segouffin	24	173 cm (5 ft 8 in)	Chélan	October, 9 in Castéra-Verduzan	
New Caledonia	Gyna Moereo	18	176 cm (5 ft 9 1/2 in)	Houaïlou	August, 22 in Païta	
Nord-Pas-de-Calais	Iris Mittenaere	22	172 cm (5 ft 7 1/2 in)	Steenvoorde	September, 26 in Orchies	Miss France 2016; Miss Universe 2016; Prize of General Knowledge
Normandy	Daphné Bruman	24	178 cm (5 ft 10 in)	Caen	October, 13 in Mortagne-au-Perche	
Pays de Loire	Angelina Laurent	20	173 cm (5 ft 8 in)	Ruaudin	October, 2 in Châteaubriant	
Picardy	Émilie Delaplace	19	173 cm (5 ft 8 in)	Creil	September, 27 in Beauvais	
Poitou-Charentes	Manon Rougier	19	179 cm (5 ft 10 1/2 in)	Roullet-Saint-Estèphe	October, 11 in Cognac	
Provence	Julia Courtès	18	172 cm (5 ft 7 1/2 in)	Martigues	July, 31st in Istres	3rd runner-up
Réunion	Azuima Issa	19	180 cm (5 ft 11 in)	Saint-Denis	July, 18 in Saint-Denis	4th runner-up
Rhône-Alpes	Nora Bengrine	20	172 cm (5 ft 7 1/2 in)	Saint-Martin-d'Hères	October, 18 in Oyonnax	Semifinalist
Roussillon	Anaïs Marin	21	178 cm (5 ft 10 in)	Alénya	July, 28 in Le Barcarès	
Saint-Pierre-et-Miquelon	Julie Briand	19	175 cm (5 ft 9 in)	Saint-Pierre	July, 10 in Saint-Pierre	
Tahiti	Vaimiti Teiefitu	19	177 cm (5 ft 9 1/2 in)	Mahina	June, 19 in Papeete	2nd runner-up

== Placements ==
=== First round ===
A jury composed of partners (internal and external) of the company Miss France pre-selects 12 young women, during an interview that took place on 17 December.

=== Second round ===
The 50% jury and the 50% public choose the five candidates who can still be elected. A ranking ofrom 1 to 12 is established for each of the two parties.

Classement des finalistes par points :

Miss	Public	Jury	Total
Nord-Pas-de-Calais	12	11	23
Martinique	11	11	22
Provence	9	12	21
Reunion Island	10	11	21
Tahiti	8	7	15
Aquitaine	6	7	13
Centre-Val de Loire	4	8	12
Alsace	7	5	12
Languedoc	3	4	7
Brittany	5	2	7
Rhône-Alpes	2	4	6
Côte d'Azur	1	2	3

=== Last round ===
Only the audience can choose the winner and her runners-up by voting.

Contestant	Results
Nord-Pas-de-Calais	26%
Martinique	20%
Tahiti	19%
Provence	17%
Reunion Island	16%

== Judges ==
The complete panel of judges was revealed on 11 December.

Membre		Notes
Jean-Paul Gaultier	Jean-Paul Gaultier (president)	Designer
Anggun	Anggun	Singer
Patrick Fiori	Patrick Fiori	Singer
	Kendji Girac	Singer
Frédéric Michalak	Frédéric Michalak	Rugby player.
Laëtitia Milot	Laëtitia Milot	Actress
Chloé Mortaud	Chloé Mortaud	Miss France 2009

== Crossovers ==
Contestants who previously competed or will be competing at international beauty pageants:

Miss Universe

- 2016: Nord-Pas-de-Calais – Iris Mittenaere (Winner)
  - (Pasay, Philippines)

Miss World

- 2016: Martinique – Morgane Edvige (Top 20)
  - (Washington, United States)
