= Peyrolles-en-Provence =

Commune in Provence-Alpes-Côte d'Azur, France

Peyrolles-en-Provence Peiròla de Provença (Occitan)
- Commune
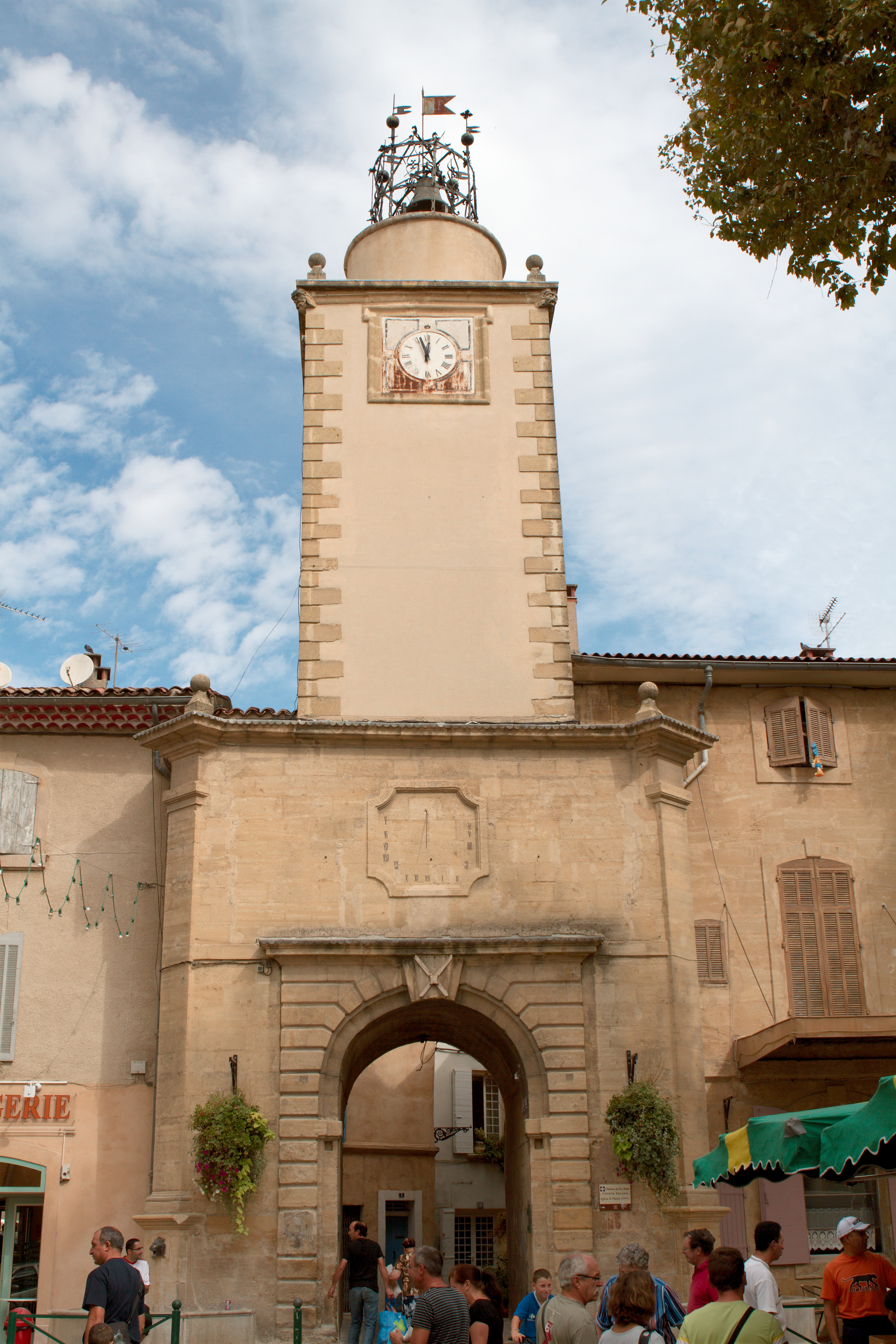
- The 17th-century bell tower in the town centre of Peyrolles-en-Provence

- Coat of arms
- Location of Peyrolles-en-Provence
- Location within France Location within Provence-Alpes-Côte d'Azur
- Coordinates: 43°38′47″N 5°35′09″E
- Country: France
- Region: Provence-Alpes-Côte d'Azur
- Department: Bouches-du-Rhône
- Arrondissement: Aix-en-Provence
- Canton: Trets
- Intercommunality: Aix-Marseille-Provence

Government
  - Mayor (2026–32): Thomas Arcamone
- Area^{1}: 34.9 km^{2} (13.5 sq mi)
- Elevation: 220 m (720 ft)
- Highest elevation: 782 m (2,566 ft)
- Lowest elevation: 201 m (659 ft)
- Population (2023): 5,409
  - Density: 155/km^{2} (401/sq mi)
- Time zone: UTC+01:00 (CET)
  - Summer (DST): UTC+02:00 (CEST)
- INSEE/Postal code: 13074 /13860
- ^{1} French Land Register data, which excludes lakes, ponds, glaciers > 1 km^{2} (0.386 sq mi or 247 acres) and river estuaries.

Peyrolles-en-Provence (French pronunciation: [pɛʁɔl ɑ̃ pʁɔvɑ̃s]; Occitan: Peiròla de Provença) is a commune in the Bouches-du-Rhône department in the Provence-Alpes-Côte d'Azur region in Southern France. Part of the Aix-Marseille-Provence Metropolis, it is located 18 km (11.2 mi) northeast of Aix-en-Provence.

== Demographics ==
Historical population

Year	Pop.	±% p.a.
1793	769	—
1800	775	+0.11%
1806	913	+2.77%
1821	1,135	+1.46%
1831	1,171	+0.31%
1836	1,170	−0.02%
1841	1,203	+0.56%
1846	1,159	−0.74%
1851	1,222	+1.06%
1856	1,216	−0.10%
1861	1,260	+0.71%
1866	1,260	+0.00%
1872	1,255	−0.07%
1876	1,194	−1.24%
1881	1,040	−2.72%
1886	1,022	−0.35%
1891	974	−0.96%
1896	1,005	+0.63%
1901	927	−1.60%

Year	Pop.	±% p.a.
1906	886	−0.90%
1911	921	+0.78%
1921	804	−1.35%
1926	811	+0.17%
1931	860	+1.18%
1936	906	+1.05%
1946	1,049	+1.48%
1954	1,199	+1.68%
1962	2,003	+6.62%
1968	2,249	+1.95%
1975	2,297	+0.30%
1982	2,560	+1.56%
1990	2,918	+1.65%
1999	3,914	+3.32%
2007	4,286	+1.14%
2012	4,751	+2.08%
2017	5,105	+1.45%
2023	5,409	+0.97%

Source: EHESS and INSEE (1968-2023)

== Climate ==
On average, Peyrolles-en-Provence experiences 59.3 days per year with a minimum temperature below 0 °C (32.0 °F), 0.8 days per year with a minimum temperature below −10 °C (14.0 °F), 0.4 days per year with a maximum temperature below 0 °C (32.0 °F), and 66.8 days per year with a maximum temperature above 30 °C (86.0 °F). The record high temperature was 44.4 °C (111.9 °F) on 28 June 2019, while the record low temperature was −14.1 °C (6.6 °F) on 12 February 2012.

Climate data for Peyrolles-en-Provence (1991–2020 normals, extremes 2005–present)
Month	Jan	Feb	Mar	Apr	May	Jun	Jul	Aug	Sep	Oct	Nov	Dec	Year
Record high °C (°F)	20.1 (68.2)	23.3 (73.9)	26.1 (79.0)	29.2 (84.6)	34.3 (93.7)	44.4 (111.9)	38.9 (102.0)	41.5 (106.7)	35.5 (95.9)	31.3 (88.3)	23.4 (74.1)	21.6 (70.9)	44.4 (111.9)
Mean daily maximum °C (°F)	11.3 (52.3)	12.6 (54.7)	16.3 (61.3)	20.1 (68.2)	24.0 (75.2)	29.0 (84.2)	32.4 (90.3)	31.6 (88.9)	26.9 (80.4)	21.5 (70.7)	15.4 (59.7)	11.3 (52.3)	21.0 (69.9)
Daily mean °C (°F)	5.9 (42.6)	6.4 (43.5)	9.6 (49.3)	13.0 (55.4)	16.6 (61.9)	21.0 (69.8)	23.8 (74.8)	23.0 (73.4)	19.4 (66.9)	15.1 (59.2)	9.9 (49.8)	6.0 (42.8)	14.1 (57.5)
Mean daily minimum °C (°F)	0.5 (32.9)	0.2 (32.4)	2.9 (37.2)	6.0 (42.8)	9.3 (48.7)	12.9 (55.2)	15.2 (59.4)	14.5 (58.1)	11.9 (53.4)	8.8 (47.8)	4.5 (40.1)	0.7 (33.3)	7.3 (45.1)
Record low °C (°F)	−10.1 (13.8)	−14.1 (6.6)	−7.7 (18.1)	−4.5 (23.9)	−1.2 (29.8)	1.5 (34.7)	6.8 (44.2)	5.6 (42.1)	1.7 (35.1)	−4.1 (24.6)	−8.0 (17.6)	−11.0 (12.2)	−14.1 (6.6)
Average precipitation mm (inches)	48.3 (1.90)	37.4 (1.47)	36.9 (1.45)	49.0 (1.93)	49.3 (1.94)	47.6 (1.87)	22.6 (0.89)	30.4 (1.20)	54.1 (2.13)	81.0 (3.19)	84.5 (3.33)	54.3 (2.14)	595.4 (23.44)
Average precipitation days (≥ 1.0 mm)	5.1	6.1	6.1	6.8	6.2	4.1	2.2	3.3	4.6	5.1	6.8	5.6	62.0
Source: Meteociel

== See also ==
- Communes of the Bouches-du-Rhône department
