= Ferques =

- Commune
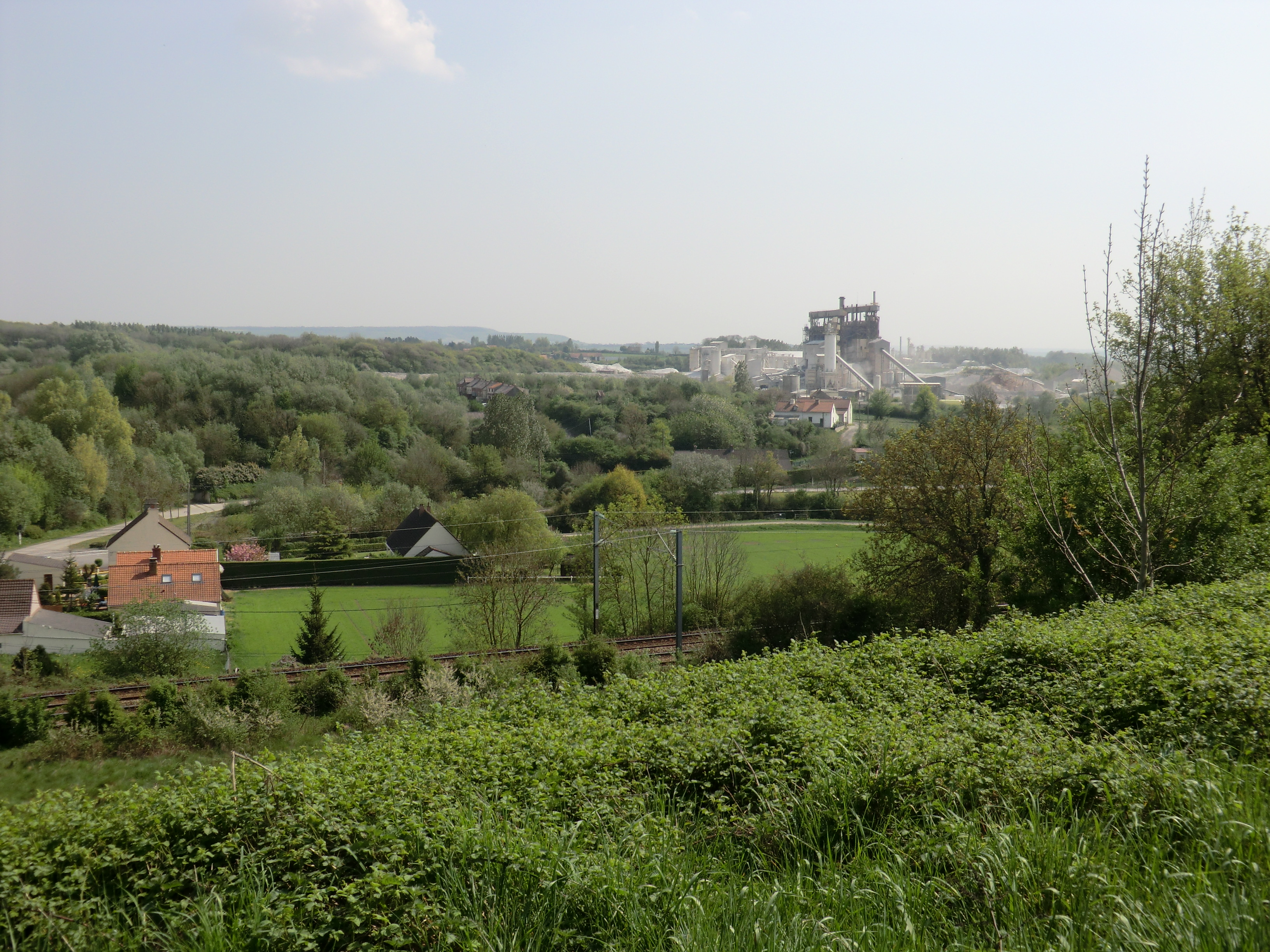
- A general view of Ferques

- Coat of arms
- Location of Ferques
- Location within France Location within Hauts-de-France
- Coordinates: 50°49′48″N 1°45′39″E
- Country: France
- Region: Hauts-de-France
- Department: Pas-de-Calais
- Arrondissement: Boulogne-sur-Mer
- Canton: Desvres
- Intercommunality: CC Terre des Deux Caps

Government
  - Mayor (2020–2026): Denis Joly
- Area^{1}: 8.97 km^{2} (3.46 sq mi)
- Elevation: 93 m (305 ft)
- Highest elevation: 120 m (390 ft)
- Lowest elevation: 39 m (128 ft)
- Population (2023): 1,770
  - Density: 197/km^{2} (511/sq mi)
- Time zone: UTC+01:00 (CET)
  - Summer (DST): UTC+02:00 (CEST)
- INSEE/Postal code: 62329 /62250
- ^{1} French Land Register data, which excludes lakes, ponds, glaciers > 1 km^{2} (0.386 sq mi or 247 acres) and river estuaries.

Ferques (French pronunciation: [fɛʁk]) is a commune in the Pas-de-Calais department in the Hauts-de-France region of France 12 miles (19 km) northeast of Boulogne.

== Population ==
Historical population
Year	Pop.	±% p.a.
1968	1,689	—
1975	1,551	−1.21%
1982	1,557	+0.06%
1990	1,690	+1.03%
1999	1,811	+0.77%
2007	1,892	+0.55%
2012	1,853	−0.42%
2017	1,802	−0.56%
2023	1,770	−0.30%
Source: INSEE

== See also ==
- Communes of the Pas-de-Calais department
