= Grosseto-Prugna =

Commune in Corsica, France

- Commune
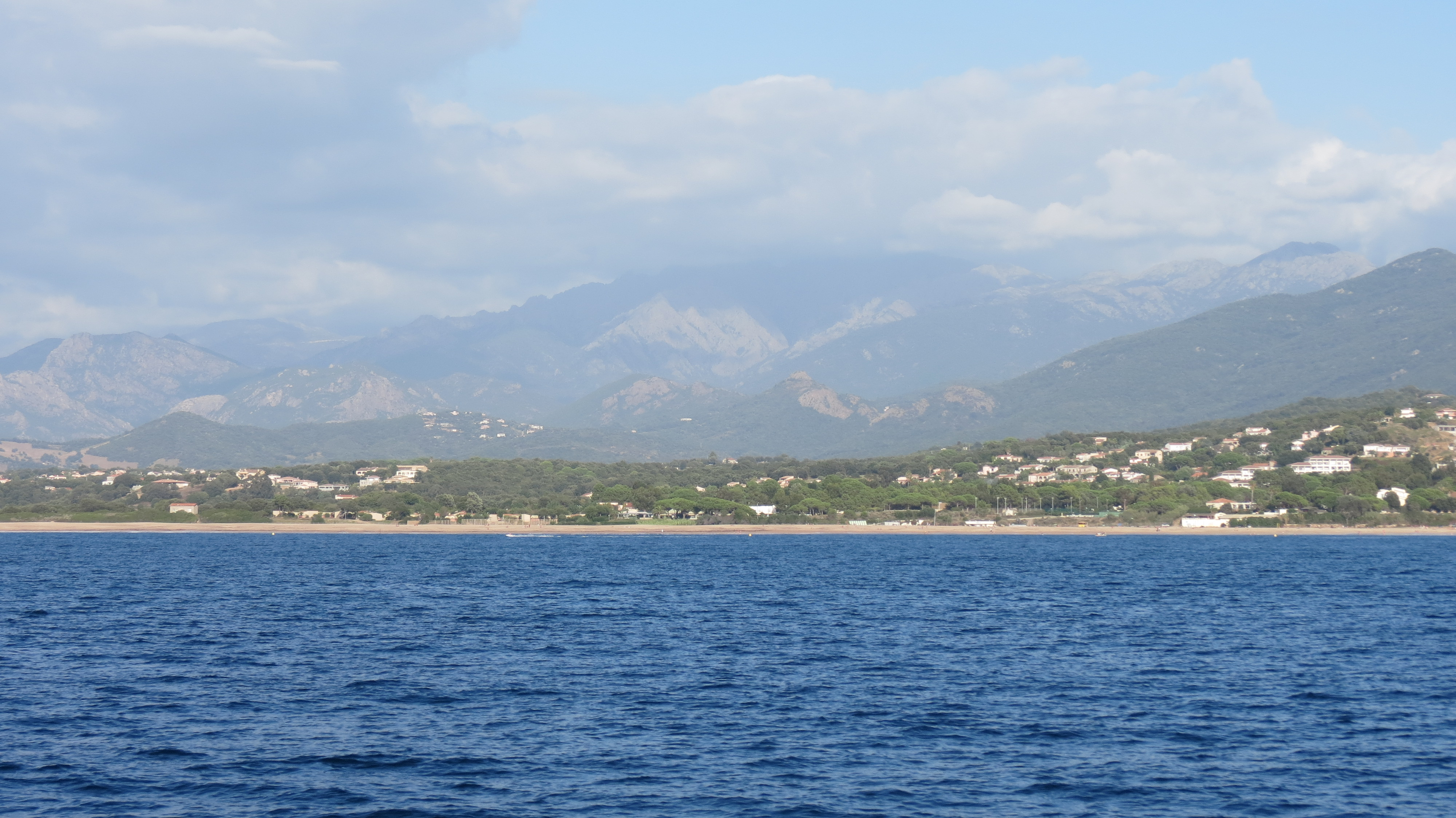
- The seaside resort of Porticcio, in the commune of Grosseto-Prugna, with a view of the sea

- Coat of arms
- Location of Grosseto-Prugna
- Location within France Location within Corsica
- Coordinates: 41°52′20″N 8°57′51″E
- Country: France
- Region: Corsica
- Department: Corse-du-Sud
- Arrondissement: Ajaccio
- Canton: Taravo-Ornano

Government
  - Mayor (2020–2026): Valérie Bozzi
- Area^{1}: 31.56 km^{2} (12.19 sq mi)
- Elevation: 400 m (1,300 ft)
- Highest elevation: 1,161 m (3,809 ft)
- Lowest elevation: 0 m (0 ft)
- Population (2023): 3,900
  - Density: 120/km^{2} (320/sq mi)
- Time zone: UTC+01:00 (CET)
  - Summer (DST): UTC+02:00 (CEST)
- INSEE/Postal code: 2A130 /20128
- ^{1} French Land Register data, which excludes lakes, ponds, glaciers > 1 km^{2} (0.386 sq mi or 247 acres) and river estuaries.

Grosseto-Prugna (French pronunciation: [ɡʁoseto pʁuɲa]; Corsican: Grussetu è Prugna or U Grussetu è a Prugna) is a commune in the Corse-du-Sud department of France on the island of Corsica.

== Population ==
Historical population
Year	Pop.	±% p.a.
1968	444	—
1975	843	+9.59%
1982	1,542	+9.01%
1990	1,943	+2.93%
1999	2,152	+1.14%
2007	2,594	+2.36%
2012	2,690	+0.73%
2017	3,124	+3.04%
2023	3,900	+3.77%
Source: INSEE

== See also ==
- Torra di Capiteddu
- Communes of the Corse-du-Sud department
