= April Benayoum =

French model and beauty pageant contestant

- Born: 16 March 1999 (age 27); Aix-en-Provence, France
- Height: 1.76 m (5 ft 9 1/2 in)
- Beauty pageant titleholder
- Title: Miss Pays d'Aix 2020; Miss Provence 2020; Miss World France 2021 (Note: Benayoum was appointed Miss World France by the Miss France Committee, as Amandine Petit, the winner of Miss France 2021, was unable to compete in Miss World 2021 due to a date conflict with Miss France 2022.)
- Hair color: Blonde
- Eye color: Blue
- Major competitions: Miss France 2021 (1st Runner-Up); Miss World 2021 (Top 13)

April Benayoum (born 16 March 1999) is a French model and beauty pageant titleholder who was crowned Miss Provence 2020 and Miss World France 2021. As Miss Provence, Benayoum competed at Miss France 2021, where she placed as the first runner-up. Following the competition, Benayoum was appointed Miss World France 2021, and placed in the Top 13 at Miss World 2021.

In the aftermath of Miss France, Benayoum, who is of partial Israeli origin, was the target of anti-Semitism on social media after speaking about her Israeli origins during the event. The incident received media attention in France, and resulted in seven netizens being convicted of aggravated insult for prejudiced comments made online about Benayoum and her ethnicity.

== Early life and education ==
Benayoum was born on 16 March 1999 in Aix-en-Provence to parents Didier and Nelly Benayoum (née Stojcic). Her father is of Italian and Israeli descent and worked as the chief warrant officer of the gendarmerie in Éguilles, while her mother is of Serbo-Croatian origin and worked as a school monitor at a collège. Benayoum's paternal grandmother Georgette Ivaldi was a former beauty pageant titleholder who was crowned Miss Marseille in the 1950s.

Benayoum grew up in a variety of cities in the Provence-Alpes-Côte d'Azur (PACA) region, such as Menton, Martigues, and Éguilles, moving often due to her father's career. After receiving her baccalauréat litteraire, Benayoum received a brevet de technicien supérieur (BTS) diploma in international trade in 2019, part of which was spent living and working in London, and afterwards a bachelor's degree in marketing.

== Pageantry ==
=== Miss Provence 2020 ===
Benayoum began her pageantry career in August 2020, after taking part in the Miss Pays d'Aix 2020 pageant. She ultimately went on to win the title, which qualified her to compete in Miss Provence 2020 later that year. Miss Provence was held in October 2020, and saw Benayoum advancing into the Top 5 and ultimately being crowned the winner by outgoing titleholder Lou Ruat. This earned her the right to represent Provence at Miss France 2021.

Miss France was held on 19 December 2020 at Puy du Fou, after being postponed one week from its original date due to the COVID-19 pandemic in France. Benayoum competed in the finals, where she advanced to the top fifteen and later the top five. After reaching the top five, Benayoum was announced as the first runner-up behind winner Amandine Petit, becoming the second consecutive representative from Provence to finish as the first runner-up. During the pageant, Benayoum mentioned her ethnic origins, which includes Israeli ancestry from her paternal side, which led to an onslaught of anti-Semitic comments targeted towards her on social media, such as "Hitler forgot about this one" and "Don't vote for a Jew." The treatment Benayoum received for mentioning her Israeli origins was condemned by a variety of figures, including Petit and French politicians Éric Ciotti, Christian Estrosi, Renaud Muselier, and Gérald Darmanin. Legal action against the netizens responsible for the attacks was initiated by Marlène Schiappa, which led to eight individuals being tried for aggravated insult due to the anti-Semitic comments levied at Benayoum. Seven of the charged individuals were convicted and ordered to pay fines ranging from €300 to €800, while the eighth was acquitted after his Tweet was determined to not have directly targeted Benayoum.

Following Miss France, Benayoum began modeling professionally, appearing on the cover of Elle, being hired as the ambassador for Camaïeu, and walking as a runway model at a fashion show in Casablanca with Petit. She additionally appeared as a contestant in Fort Boyard and as a guest at the 2021 Cannes Film Festival, and was selected as one of 109 women chosen to portray Marianne in an exhibit unveiled by Schiappa at the Panthéon.

=== Miss World France 2021 ===
In October 2021, Benayoum was announced to have been appointed Miss World France 2021 by Sylvie Tellier and the Miss France Committee, receiving the right to represent the country at the Miss World 2021 competition. The choice was made as Petit would be unable to compete as she had to be present at Miss France 2022 to crown her successor, while Clémence Botino, whom had been crowned Miss France 2020, was set to represent France at Miss Universe 2021 in the same timeframe.

Miss World 2021 was originally planned to be held in San Juan, Puerto Rico on 16 December 2021. Two days prior to the pageant's broadcast, several cases of COVID-19 began to be reported amongst contestants and staff, which led to the cancelation and postponement of the pageant's final show. The pageant was later rescheduled for 16 March 2022, on Benayoum's birthday, with only the 40 selected semi-finalists being invited to return to compete; Benayoum was ultimately selected as one of the 40. She went on to place in the Top 13 after competing in the final show.

== Notes ==
Awards and achievements
Preceded by (Guadeloupe) Ophély Mézino	Miss World France; 2021	Succeeded by (Guadeloupe) Clémence Botino
Preceded by Lou Ruat	Miss Provence; 2020	Succeeded by Eva Navarro
Preceded by Prisca Lenormand	Miss Pays d'Aix; 2020	Succeeded by Carla Goupille
