= Miss Normandy =

Beauty contest

- Type: Beauty pageant
- Headquarters: Normandy, France
- Members: Miss France
- Official language: French
- Regional director: Julie Galaud
- Website: www.missnormandie.fr

Miss Normandy (French: Miss Normandie) is a French beauty pageant which selects a representative for the Miss France national competition from the region of Normandy. Women representing the region under various different titles have competed at Miss France since 1952, although the Miss Normandy title was not used regularly until 1979.

The current Miss Normandy is Pauline Gourlez, who was crowned Miss Normandy 2026 on 22 May 2026. Seven women from Normandy have been crowned Miss France:

- Monique Negler, who was crowned Miss France 1958
- Jeanne Beck, who was crowned Miss France 1967
- Isabelle Benard, who was crowned Miss France 1981
- Marine Robine, who was crowned Miss France 1984
- Cindy Fabre, who was crowned Miss France 2005
- Malika Ménard, who was crowned Miss France 2010
- Amandine Petit, who was crowned Miss France 2021

== Results summary ==
- Miss France: Monique Negler (1957); Jeanne Beck (1966); Isabelle Benard (1980); Martine Robine (1983); Cindy Fabre (2004); Malika Ménard (2009); Amandine Petit (2020)
- 1st Runner-Up: Céline Marteau (1989)
- 2nd Runner-Up: Thérèse Martin-Dubuard (1952); Michelle Beaurain (1968); Victoire Dupuis (2025)
- 3rd Runner-Up: Martine Babouot (1981)
- 4th Runner-Up: Sarah Tillard (2001); Youssra Askry (2021)
- 5th Runner-Up: Marie-Dominique Boucourt (1984); Marine Clautour (2019); Wissem Morel (2023)
- 6th Runner-Up: Sylviane Covet (1982); Estelle Celayeta (1995); Émilie Duvivier (1998)
- Top 12/Top 15: Mylène Roxin (1992); Johanna Moreau (2008); Juliette Polge (2010); Esther Houdement (2016); Lucile Lecellier (2024)

== Gallery ==
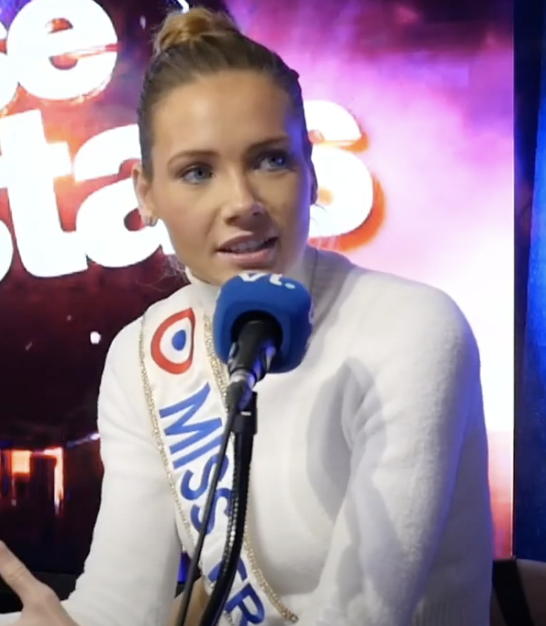
Miss Normandy 2020 and Miss France 2021
Amandine Petit

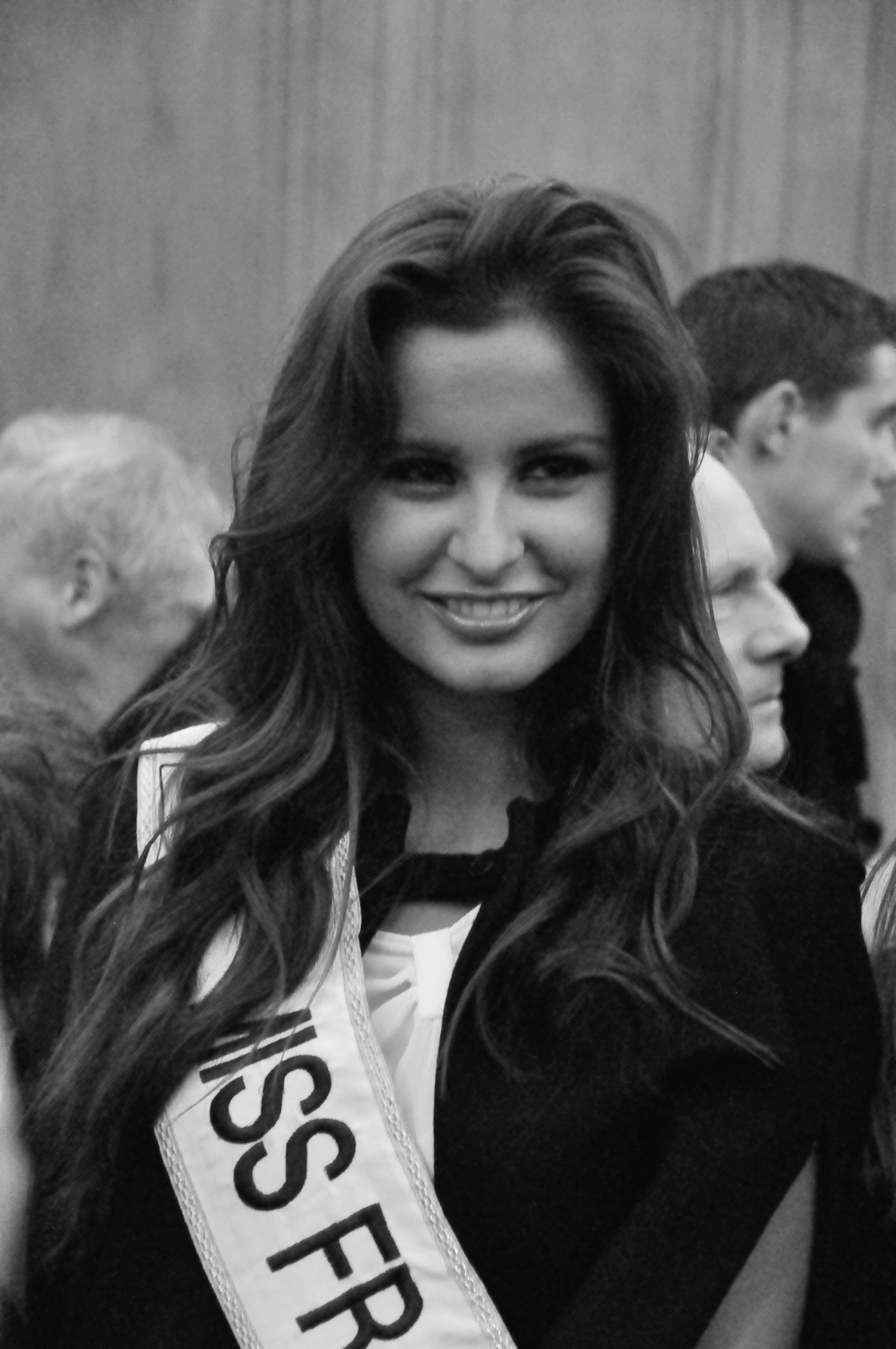
Miss Normandy 2009 and Miss France 2010
Malika Ménard

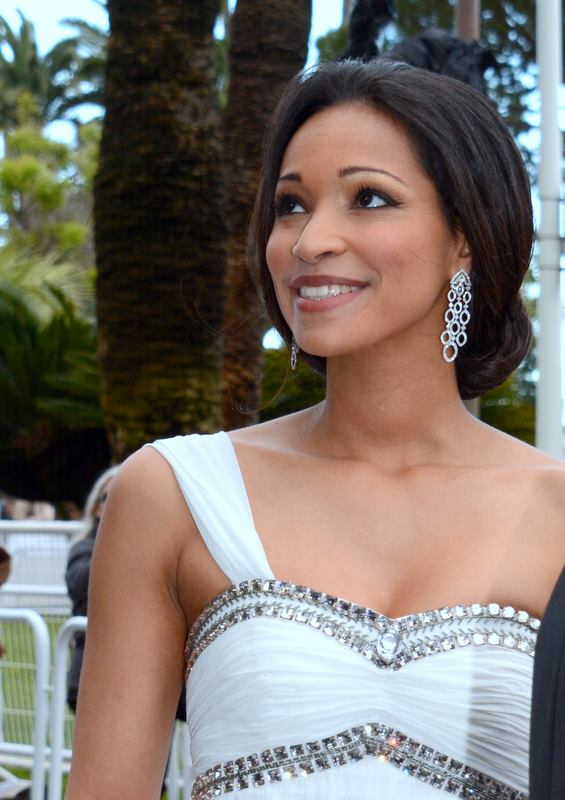
Miss Normandy 2004 and Miss France 2005
Cindy Fabre

== Titleholders ==
Year	Name	Age (Note: Ages at the time of Miss France)	Height	Hometown	Miss France placement	Notes
2026	Pauline Gourlez	21	1.71 m (5 ft 7 1/2 in)	Giberville	TBD	
2025	Victoire Dupuis	20	1.70 m (5 ft 7 in)	Limésy	2nd Runner-Up	
2024	Lucile Lecellier	27	1.74 m (5 ft 8 1/2 in)	Sainte-Cécile	Top 15	
2023	Wissem Morel	21	1.76 m (5 ft 9 1/2 in)	Rouen	Top 15 (5th Runner-Up)	
2022	Perrine Prunier	23	1.71 m (5 ft 7 1/2 in)	Caen		
2021	Youssra Askry	24	1.72 m (5 ft 7 1/2 in)	Rouen	4th Runner-Up	
2020	Amandine Petit	23	1.75 m (5 ft 9 in)	Bourguébus	Miss France 2021	Top 21 at Miss Universe 2020
2019	Marine Clautour	21	1.72 m (5 ft 7 1/2 in)	Amfreville-la-Mi-Voie	Top 15 (5th Runner-Up)	
2018	Anaëlle Chrétien	22	1.81 m (5 ft 11 1/2 in)	Saint-Pair-sur-Mer		
2017	Alexane Dubourg	20	1.70 m (5 ft 7 in)	Cairon		
2016	Esther Houdement	20	1.83 m (6 ft 0 in)	Butot	Top 12	
2015	Daphné Bruman	24	1.78 m (5 ft 10 in)	Caen		
2014	Estrella Ramirez	24	1.71 m (5 ft 7 1/2 in)	Sées		
2013	Ophélie Genest	19	1.72 m (5 ft 7 1/2 in)	Caen		
2012	Pauline Llorca	24	1.71 m (5 ft 7 1/2 in)	Beuvillers		
2011	Sophie Duval	20	1.77 m (5 ft 9 1/2 in)	Saint-Martin-de-Bonfossé		
2010	Juliette Polge	22	1.70 m (5 ft 7 in)	Le Noyer-en-Ouche	Top 12	Polge is the grand-niece of Valéry Giscard d'Estaing.
2009	Malika Ménard	22	1.76 m (5 ft 9 1/2 in)	Hérouville-Saint-Clair	Miss France 2010	Top 15 at Miss Universe 2010
2008	Johanna Moreau	24	1.81 m (5 ft 11 1/2 in)	Sées	Top 12	
2007	Séverine Daniel	20	1.72 m (5 ft 7 1/2 in)	Chèvreville		
2006	Clémence Preudhomme	22	1.82 m (5 ft 11 1/2 in)	Gerville		
2005	Delphine Lefebvre	19	1.82 m (5 ft 11 1/2 in)	Granville		
2004	Cindy Fabre	19	1.78 m (5 ft 10 in)	Falaise	Miss France 2005	National director of the Miss France Company (2022–2025)
2003	Isabelle Mouchel					
2002	Catherine Lebreton					
2001	Sarah Tillard				4th Runner-Up	
2000	Julie Leflamand					
1999	Lydie Enguehard	22	1.78 m (5 ft 10 in)	Honfleur		
1998	Émilie Duvivier	21	1.75 m (5 ft 9 in)		Top 12 (6th Runner-Up)	
1997	Delphine Garnier	22	1.71 m (5 ft 7 1/2 in)	Sainte-Honorine-la-Chardonne		
1996	Marianne Samson	18	1.70 m (5 ft 7 in)	Evreux		
1995	Estelle Celayeta				Top 12 (6th Runner-Up)	
1994	Karine Ancel					
1993	Katia Chédeville			La Ferrière-aux-Étangs		
1992	Mylène Roxin	20		Bernay	Top 12	
1991	Célia Coustic					
1990	Sandra Guillaumot					
1989	Céline Marteau				1st Runner-Up	Competed at Miss International 1990
1988	Anita Maizel	17	1.71 m (5 ft 7 1/2 in)	La Forêt-Auvray		
1987	Estelle Pelcat			Saint-Pierre-lès-Elbeuf		
1986	Estelle Simon					
1985	Corinne Noël					
1984	Marie-Dominique Boucourt				5th Runner-Up	
1983	Martine Robine	19	1.72 m (5 ft 7 1/2 in)	Deauville	Miss France 1984	
1982	Sylviane Covet	19			6th Runner-Up	
1981	Martine Babouot	16	1.71 m (5 ft 7 1/2 in)		3rd Runner-Up	
1980	Isabelle Benard	18		Vernon	Miss France 1981	
1979	Béatrice Gindre					Gindre was crowned Miss Bocage-Normandy, representing Manche, while Ribeiro was crowned Miss Normandy.
1979	Patricia Ribeiro					Gindre was crowned Miss Bocage-Normandy, representing Manche, while Ribeiro was crowned Miss Normandy.
1978	Sylvie Louise					Louise was crowned Miss Bocage-Normandy, representing Manche, Drouin was crowned Miss Lower Normandy (French: Miss Basse-Normandie), representing Calvados, Manche, and Orne, while Miralles was crowned Miss Upper Normandy (French: Miss Haute-Normandie), representing Seine-Maritime and Eure. Drouin was previously crowned Miss Basse-Normandie-Caen 1977, and Miralles was crowned Miss Haute-Normandie-Rouen 1977.
1978	Brigitte Drouin					Louise was crowned Miss Bocage-Normandy, representing Manche, Drouin was crowned Miss Lower Normandy (French: Miss Basse-Normandie), representing Calvados, Manche, and Orne, while Miralles was crowned Miss Upper Normandy (French: Miss Haute-Normandie), representing Seine-Maritime and Eure. Drouin was previously crowned Miss Basse-Normandie-Caen 1977, and Miralles was crowned Miss Haute-Normandie-Rouen 1977.
1978	Brigitte Miralles					Louise was crowned Miss Bocage-Normandy, representing Manche, Drouin was crowned Miss Lower Normandy (French: Miss Basse-Normandie), representing Calvados, Manche, and Orne, while Miralles was crowned Miss Upper Normandy (French: Miss Haute-Normandie), representing Seine-Maritime and Eure. Drouin was previously crowned Miss Basse-Normandie-Caen 1977, and Miralles was crowned Miss Haute-Normandie-Rouen 1977.
1977	Thérèse Arnoult					Arnoult was crowned Miss Bocage-Normandy, representing Manche, Drouin was crowned Miss Basse-Normandie-Caen, representing Calvados, Massuger was crowned Miss Haute-Normandie-Dieppe, representing Seine-Maritime, while Miralles was crowned Miss Haute-Normandie-Rouen, also representing Seine-Maritime. Drouin was later crowned Miss Lower Normandy 1978, and Miralles was crowned Miss Upper Normandy 1978.
1977	Brigitte Drouin					Arnoult was crowned Miss Bocage-Normandy, representing Manche, Drouin was crowned Miss Basse-Normandie-Caen, representing Calvados, Massuger was crowned Miss Haute-Normandie-Dieppe, representing Seine-Maritime, while Miralles was crowned Miss Haute-Normandie-Rouen, also representing Seine-Maritime. Drouin was later crowned Miss Lower Normandy 1978, and Miralles was crowned Miss Upper Normandy 1978.
1977	Béatrice Massuger					Arnoult was crowned Miss Bocage-Normandy, representing Manche, Drouin was crowned Miss Basse-Normandie-Caen, representing Calvados, Massuger was crowned Miss Haute-Normandie-Dieppe, representing Seine-Maritime, while Miralles was crowned Miss Haute-Normandie-Rouen, also representing Seine-Maritime. Drouin was later crowned Miss Lower Normandy 1978, and Miralles was crowned Miss Upper Normandy 1978.
1977	Brigitte Miralles					Arnoult was crowned Miss Bocage-Normandy, representing Manche, Drouin was crowned Miss Basse-Normandie-Caen, representing Calvados, Massuger was crowned Miss Haute-Normandie-Dieppe, representing Seine-Maritime, while Miralles was crowned Miss Haute-Normandie-Rouen, also representing Seine-Maritime. Drouin was later crowned Miss Lower Normandy 1978, and Miralles was crowned Miss Upper Normandy 1978.
1970	Nicole Doyer					
1969	Françoise Blanchard	17				
1968	Michelle Beaurain	18		Ouistreham	2nd Runner-Up	Beaurain was later crowned Miss Paris 1970 and Miss France 1970.
1966	Jeanne Beck			Saint-Pierre-du-Mont	Miss France 1967	
1962	Michèle Fourtin-Povel					
1957	Monique Negler				Miss France 1958	
1952	Thérèse Martin-Dubuard				2nd Runner-Up	Martin-Dubuard was crowned Miss Trouville.
