= Clémence Botino =

French beauty pageant contestant

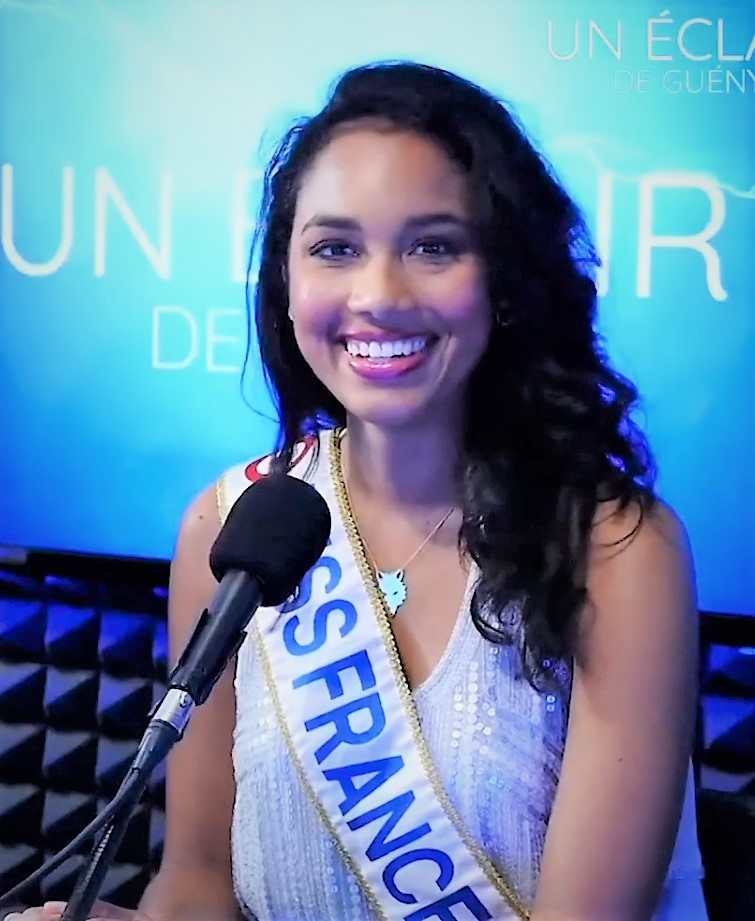
- Botino in 2020
- Born: 22 January 1997 (age 29); Le Gosier, Guadeloupe, France
- Education: Sorbonne University (DNM)
- Height: 1.75 m (5 ft 9 in)
- Beauty pageant titleholder
- Title: Miss Guadeloupe 2019; Miss France 2020
- Major competitions: Miss France 2020; (Winner); Miss Universe 2021; (Top 10); Miss World 2023; (Top 40)
- Website: www.clemencebotino.com

Clémence Botino (born 22 January 1997) is a French beauty pageant titleholder who was crowned Miss France 2020. She represented France at Miss Universe 2021 and Miss World 2023, where she reached the top 10 and top 40, respectively. Botino was previously crowned Miss Guadeloupe 2019, and was the third woman representing Guadeloupe to become Miss France.

== Early life and education ==
Botino was born on 22 January 1997 in Le Gosier, in the French overseas department and region of Guadeloupe. She is of Indo-Guadeloupean origin through her mother, while her father has Afro-Caribbean and European ancestry. Botino has one younger brother named Lucas. While growing up, Botino was a pianist and dancer, with particular experience in salsa.

Botino was educated in Guadeloupe, graduating with a baccalauréat scientifique with mention très bien honors in 2014. At age 17, Botino moved to Miami in the United States for one year to study at an international school and improve her English. After returning to Guadeloupe, she studied a classe préparatoire program in literature at Lycée Gerville-Réache in Basse-Terre, graduating in 2017. She afterwards relocated to Paris to enroll in Sorbonne University, receiving a bachelor's degree in art history. Prior to becoming Miss France, Botino was pursuing a master's degree in art history at the Sorbonne, specializing in fashion history with the aspiration of becoming a cultural heritage curator.

== Pageantry ==
=== Miss Guadeloupe 2019 ===
On 3 August 2019, she won Miss Guadeloupe, succeeding Ophély Mézino.

=== Miss France 2020 ===
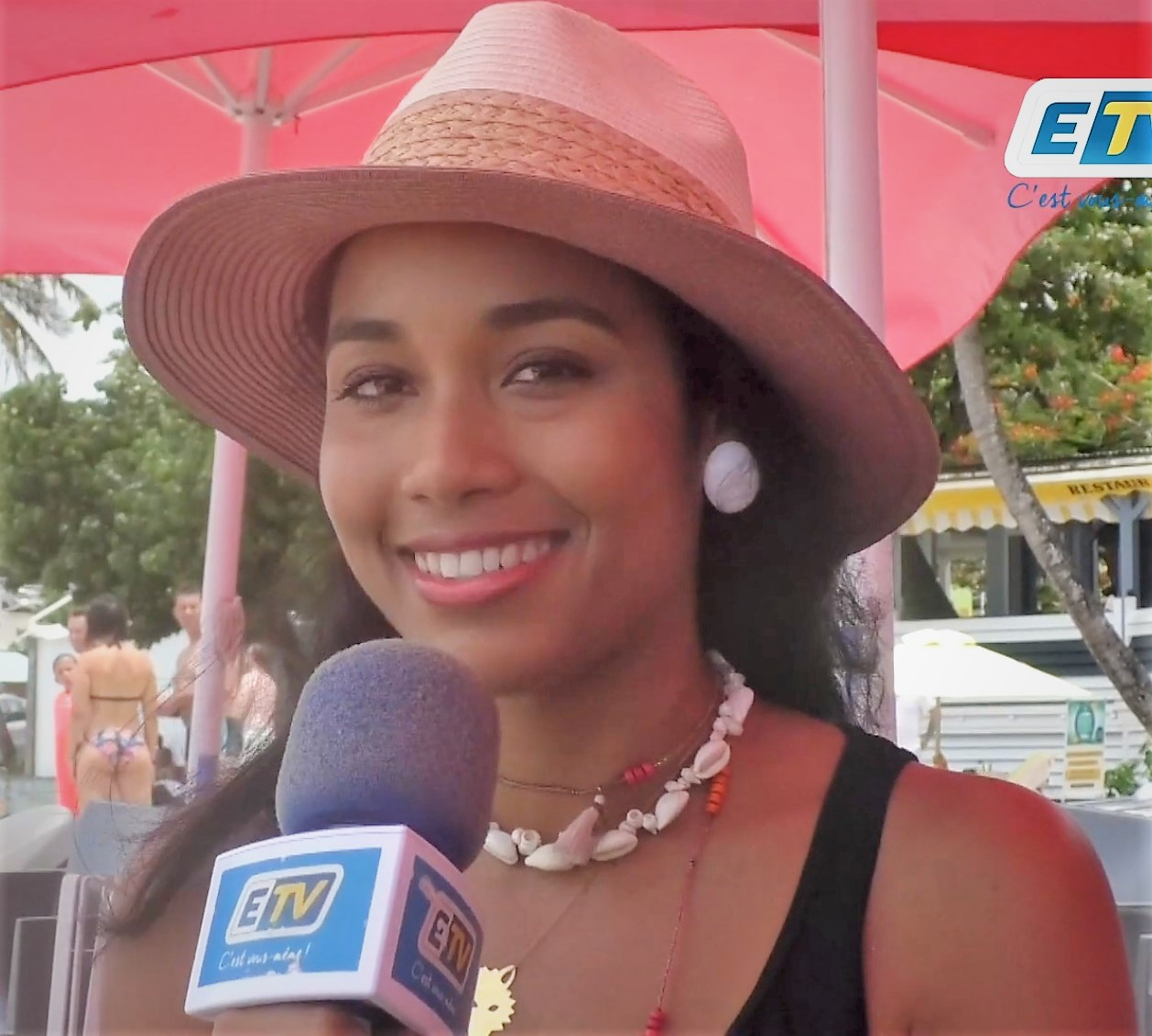
Botino in 2019

On 14 December 2019, she won Miss France 2020 at the Dôme de Marseille. She received 31.95% of the public vote, narrowly winning ahead of Lou Ruat (Miss Provence) with 30.66%, succeeding Vaimalama Chaves, Miss France 2019, and became the third Miss Guadeloupe to win Miss France after Véronique de la Cruz in 1993 and Corinne Coman in 2003. Before her win, it was announced in early December that Botino was first in the general culture test of the Miss France competition, with a mark of 17.5 out of 20. She ended her reign as Miss France on 19 December 2020 after crowning Amandine Petit as her successor during Miss France 2021, held at Puy du Fou in Les Epesses.

Botino represented France at Miss Universe 2021. She was originally set to represent France at Miss Universe 2020, but due to potential date conflicts between Miss Universe 2021 and Miss France 2022, she was instead switched to Miss Universe 2021 while Petit competed at Miss Universe 2020. Botino tested positive for COVID-19 upon arriving at Miss Universe, and was taken to a government isolation hotel. She had been fully vaccinated, and had been tested upon departure. She was released from quarantine after ten days and was authorized to rejoin the competition.

For the national costume competition, Botino wore an outfit paying tribute to Josephine Baker, made of a set of rhinestone lingerie adorned with jewels and large feather wings. Her performance during the evening gown competition was less successful, as she tripped on the hem of her dress. Botino reached the top ten, the highest placement among the European candidates.

Botino represented France at Miss World 2023, where she placed in the top 40.

== Post-pageantry ==
In 2025, Botino began working full-time as a digital communications advisor for the French National Commission for UNESCO.

Awards and achievements
Preceded by April Benayoum, Provence	Miss World France; 2023	Succeeded by Agathe Cauet, Nord-Pas-de-Calais
Preceded by Amandine Petit, Normandy	Miss Universe France; 2021	Succeeded by Floriane Bascou, Martinique
Preceded by (French Polynesia) Vaimalama Chaves	Miss France; 2020	Succeeded by Amandine Petit, Normandy
Preceded by Ophély Mézino	Miss Guadeloupe; 2019	Succeeded by Kenza Andreze-Louison
