= Miss Provence =

Beauty contest

- Type: Beauty pageant
- Headquarters: Provence-Alpes-Côte d'Azur, France
- Members: Miss France
- Official language: French
- Regional director: Lydia Podossenoff
- Website: www.missprovencealpescotedazur.fr

Miss Provence is a French beauty pageant which selects a representative for the Miss France national competition from the departments of Alpes-de-Haute-Provence, Bouches-du-Rhône, Hautes-Alpes, Vaucluse, and portions of Var in the region of Provence-Alpes-Côte d'Azur (PACA). The other regional pageant within PACA is Miss Côte d'Azur, which selects a representative from the department of Alpes-Maritimes and the remaining portions of Var. The first Miss Provence was crowned in 1986, although women from the region have competed at Miss France with other titles since 1976.

The current Miss Provence is Ophélie Vitalbo, who was crowned Miss Provence 2026 on 24 July 2026. A total of four women from Guadeloupe have been crowned Miss France One woman from Provence has been crowned Miss France:

- Sylvie Paréra, who was crowned Miss France 1979, competing as Miss Marseille

== Results summary ==
- Miss France: Sylvie Paréra (1978; Miss Marseille)
- 1st Runner-Up: Tatiana Bouguer (1999); Lou Ruat (2019); April Benayoum (2020)
- 2nd Runner-Up: Laëtizia Penmellen (2013); Adélina Blanc (2023)
- 3rd Runner-Up: Jennifer Willey (1998); Émilie Corbi (2009); Solène Froment (2011); Julia Courtès (2015)
- 5th Runner-Up: Brigitte Hermelin (1976; Miss Marseille); Analisa Kebaili (2010); Wynona Gueraini (2018)
- Top 12/Top 15: Pascale Delzenne (1996); Lætitia Duffaux (2001); Lydia Podossenoff (2005); Marine Mahiques (2012); Anne-Laure Fourmont (2014); Kleofina Pnishi (2017)

== Titleholders ==
Year	Name	Age (Note: Ages at the time of Miss France)	Height	Hometown	Miss France placement	Notes
2026	Ophélie Vitalbo	27	1.71 m (5 ft 7 1/2 in)	Velleron	TBA	
2025	Julie Zitouni	26	1.73 m (5 ft 8 in)	Marseille		Zitouni was dethroned on 9 December 2025, after a private video leaked of her and Miss Aquitaine 2025, Aïnhoa Lahitete, making disparaging comments about other contestants for Miss France 2026.
2024	Mégane Bertaud	24	1.73 m (5 ft 8 in)	Tourrettes		
2023	Adélina Blanc	25	1.73 m (5 ft 8 in)	Eyragues	2nd Runner-Up	
2022	Chana Goyons	18	1.80 m (5 ft 11 in)	Gassin		
2021	Eva Navarro	19	1.70 m (5 ft 7 in)	Istres		
2020	April Benayoum	21	1.76 m (5 ft 9 1/2 in)	Éguilles	1st Runner-Up	Top 13 at Miss World 2021
2019	Lou Ruat	19	1.70 m (5 ft 7 in)	Aix-en-Provence	1st Runner-Up	
2018	Aurélie Pons	22	1.74 m (5 ft 8 1/2 in)	Valréas	Did not compete	Pons resigned a month after winning the title for personal reasons, and was replaced by Gueraini, her second runner-up, after her first runner-up declined to take over the title.
2018	Wynona Gueraini	19	1.73 m (5 ft 8 in)	Marignane	Top 12 (5th Runner-Up)	Pons resigned a month after winning the title for personal reasons, and was replaced by Gueraini, her second runner-up, after her first runner-up declined to take over the title.
2017	Kleofina Pnishi	23	1.70 m (5 ft 7 in)	Peyrolles-en-Provence	Top 12	
2016	Noémie Mazella	19	1.76 m (5 ft 9 1/2 in)	Marseille		
2015	Julia Courtès	18	1.72 m (5 ft 7 1/2 in)	Martigues	3rd Runner-Up	
2014	Anne-Laure Fourmont	21	1.74 m (5 ft 8 1/2 in)	Toulon	Top 12	
2013	Laëtizia Penmellen	19	1.71 m (5 ft 7 1/2 in)	Villecroze	2nd Runner-Up	Competed at Miss Earth 2014
2012	Marine Mahiques	19	1.76 m (5 ft 9 1/2 in)	Seillans	Top 12	
2011	Solène Froment	19	1.81 m (5 ft 11 1/2 in)	Aix-en-Provence	3rd Runner-Up	
2010	Analisa Kebaili	18	1.71 m (5 ft 7 1/2 in)	Marseille	Top 12 (5th Runner-Up)	
2009	Émilie Corbi	21	1.76 m (5 ft 9 1/2 in)	Bouc-Bel-Air	3rd Runner-Up	
2008	Laurie Imbert	19	1.72 m (5 ft 7 1/2 in)	Martigues		
2007	Angélique Donat	23	1.78 m (5 ft 10 in)	La Garde		
2006	Stéphanie Gros	24	1.75 m (5 ft 9 in)	Roquebrune-sur-Argens		
2005	Lydia Podossenoff	23	1.80 m (5 ft 11 in)	Barrême	Top 12	
2004	Angélique Faure	22	1.76 m (5 ft 9 1/2 in)	Gap		
2003	Émilie Ladsous					
2002	Béatrice Poorterman					
2001	Lætitia Duffaux			Cavaillon	Top 12	
2000	Johanne Grall			La Londe-les-Maures		
1999	Tatiana Bouguer	22	1.71 m (5 ft 7 1/2 in)	Bormes-les-Mimosas	1st Runner-Up	Competed at Miss International 2000
1998	Jennifer Willey	20	1.77 m (5 ft 9 1/2 in)		3rd Runner-Up	
1997	Alexia Russo	22	1.82 m (5 ft 11 1/2 in)			
1996	Pascale Delzenne				Top 12	
1995	Sarah Desage					
1994	Sophie Archambault					
1993	Maryline Dubuc	22				
1992	Sonia Dziabas	18				
1991	Barbara Ghigi					
1990	Véronique Laval					
1989	Hélène Michaud					
1988	Nathalie Wernert					
1986	Nathalie Puerari			Salernes		

=== Miss Marseille ===
From 1976 until 1978, Marseille, the largest city in Provence, crowned its own representative as Miss Marseille. The city was absorbed into Miss Provence following the establishment of Miss Provence in 1986.

Year	Name	Age	Height	Hometown	Miss France placement	Notes
1978	Sylvie Paréra	18		Marseille	Miss France 1979	
1977	Marie-Dominique Calanducci			Marseille		
1976	Brigitte Hermelin			Marseille	5th Runner-Up	

=== Miss Côte Bleue ===
In 1990 and 1991, the department of Bouches-du-Rhône crowned its own representative as Miss Côte Bleue, although the department was reabsorbed into Miss Provence in 1992.

Year	Name	Age	Height	Hometown	Miss France placement	Notes
1991	Annabel Trapani					
1990	Alexandra Devilleneuve					

=== Miss Comtat Venaissin ===
In 1986, the department of Vaucluse crowned its own representative as Miss Comtat Venaissin, although the department was absorbed into Miss Provence the following year.

Year	Name	Age	Height	Hometown	Miss France placement	Notes
1986	Juliette Ben					
