= Vaimalama Chaves =

French beauty pageant contestant (born 1994)

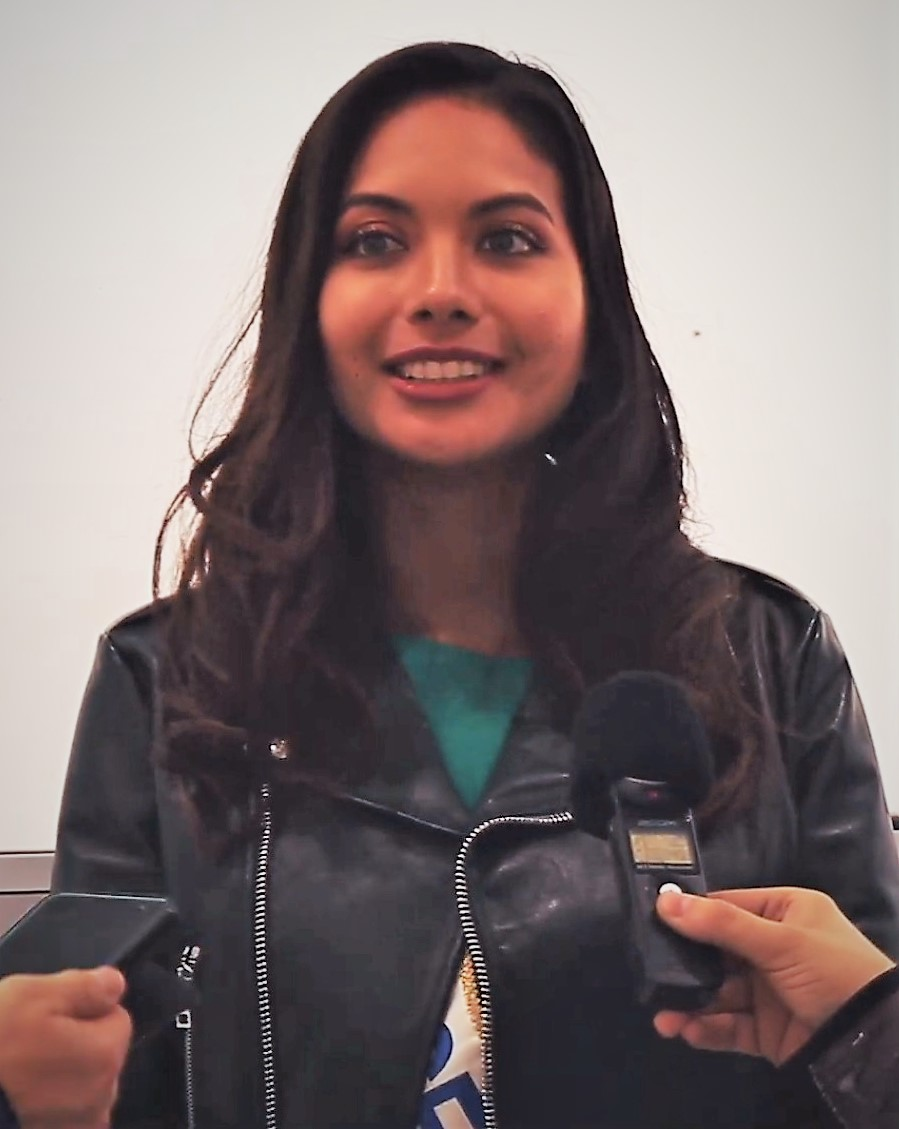
- Chaves at a signing session at Malemort in 2019
- Born: 3 December 1994 (age 31); Papeete, French Polynesia
- Other name: Vaï Chaves
- Education: University of French Polynesia
- Occupations: Singer; beauty pageant titleholder; model
- Height: 1.78 m (5 ft 10 in)
- Beauty pageant titleholder
- Title: Miss Tahiti 2018; Miss France 2019
- Hair color: Brown
- Eye color: Blue
- Major competition: Miss France 2019 (Winner)
- Musical career
- Also known as: Vaimalama
- Genre: Folk-pop
- Instruments: Vocals; ukulele
- Years active: 2019–present
- Label: TF1 Musique

Vaimalama "Vaï" Chaves (born 3 December 1994) is a French singer, beauty pageant titleholder, and model who was crowned Miss France 2019. Chaves had previously won Miss Tahiti 2018 and became the fifth representative from French Polynesia to win the Miss France title.

During her reign as Miss France, Chaves began a music career under the mononym Vaimalama, releasing her debut single "Jardin d'hiver" in November 2019. Her debut studio album Good Vaïbes was released in February 2020.

== Early life and education ==
Chaves was born on 3 December 1994 in Papeete on the island of Tahiti in French Polynesia, and raised between her mother and father's respective homes in the suburbs of Māhina and Faʻaʻā. Her father works in telecommunications at the Office of Posts and Telecommunications of French Polynesia, while her mother is a nurse. Her maternal grandfather was Wallisian, while she also has Irish and Portuguese origins through her father. Chaves is the second of five children and is the cousin of Mareva Georges, who had been crowned Miss France 1991. As a teenager, Chaves was overweight and was bullied throughout her youth for her weight.

Chaves was educated at the Lycée-collège La Mennais, where she received her baccalauréat in communications. She later received a BTS in negotiation and customer relations from Lycée Aorai in Pīraʻe, a bachelor's degree in managerial economics, and a master's degree in management from the University of French Polynesia in 2017. Prior to winning Miss Tahiti, Chaves worked as a community manager at a gym.

In 2025, Chaves revealed that she had returned to her education and was studying political science, with the aspiration of potentially becoming a politician in French Polynesia in the future.

== Pageantry ==
=== Miss Tahiti 2018 ===
Chaves began her pageantry career competing in Miss Tahiti 2018. She went on to win the competition on 22 June 2018 in Papeete and was crowned by outgoing titleholder Turouru Temorere. As Miss Tahiti 2018, Chaves earned the right to represent French Polynesia at the Miss France 2019 competition held in Lille.

=== Miss France 2019 ===
Preparations for Miss France began in November 2018, with Chaves traveling to Paris for pre-pageant activities, Mauritius for the pageant's overseas trip, and then to Lille to begin rehearsals.

The finals were held on 15 December 2018, at the Zénith de Lille. Chaves advanced from the thirty contestants to the top twelve, later also advancing to the top five. She went on to be crowned Miss France 2019 by outgoing titleholder Maëva Coucke, with her first runner-up being Ophély Mézino of Guadeloupe. Chaves was the first Tahitian representative to be crowned Miss France in twenty years, after Mareva Galanter was crowned Miss France 1999, and only the fifth Tahitian crowned ever. Following her win, Chaves became a knight of the Order of Tahiti Nui, one of the highest civilian honors in French Polynesia.

On 25 June 2019, Chaves announced that she would not represent France at Miss World 2019 or Miss Universe 2019, as she would rather accompany the contestants of Miss France 2020 during their trip to Tahiti, which would have conflicted with preparation for the international pageants. Her first runner-up, Ophély Mézino, was appointed as Miss World France 2019, while her predecessor, Maëva Coucke, was appointed to represent France at Miss Universe 2019. She completed her reign on 14 December 2019, after crowning Clémence Botino as her successor during Miss France 2020.

== Post-pageantry ==
=== Music career ===
In November 2019, Chaves began a music career, performing under the mononym Vaimalama. She released a cover of the song "Jardin d'hiver", written by Benjamin Biolay and Keren Ann and originally performed by Henri Salvador. An official music video for the cover was released via Chaves's YouTube channel on 13 November. Her debut studio album Good Vaïbes was originally set for release in February 2020, but after several postponements, partially due to the COVID-19 pandemic, the album was released in December 2020.

=== Television ===
In September 2021, Chaves was confirmed as a celebrity contestant in season 11 of Danse avec les stars, the French version of Strictly Come Dancing. Chaves was partnered with Christian Millette during the competition. They were the fifth duo to be eliminated, during the 15 October 2021 episode.

In 2026, Chaves became one of the cohosts of the La Première magazine show Tolomon, along with cohosts Virginie Sainsily and Naomi Boulay Pesenti. The show focuses on personal well-being and health. Later that year, it was announced that Chaves would appear as a contestant on season six of the French version of The Traitors.

== Discography ==
=== Albums ===
| Title | Details | Peak chart positions |
| Title | Details | FRA |
|---|---|---|
| Good Vaïbes | Released: 4 December 2020; Label: TF1 Musique; Format: Digital download | — |

=== Singles ===
| Single | Year | Peak chart positions | Album |
| Single | Year | FRA | Album |
|---|---|---|---|
| "Jardin d'hiver" | 2019 | — | Good Vaïbes |
| "Ton nom déjà" | 2019 | — | Good Vaïbes |
| "Porque te vas" | 2020 | — | Good Vaïbes |

Awards and achievements
| Preceded by (Nord-Pas-de-Calais) Maëva Coucke | Miss France; 2019 | Succeeded by (Guadeloupe) Clémence Botino |
| Preceded by Turouru Temorere | Miss Tahiti; 2018 | Succeeded by Matahari Bousquet |
