= Amandine Petit =

French beauty pageant contestant

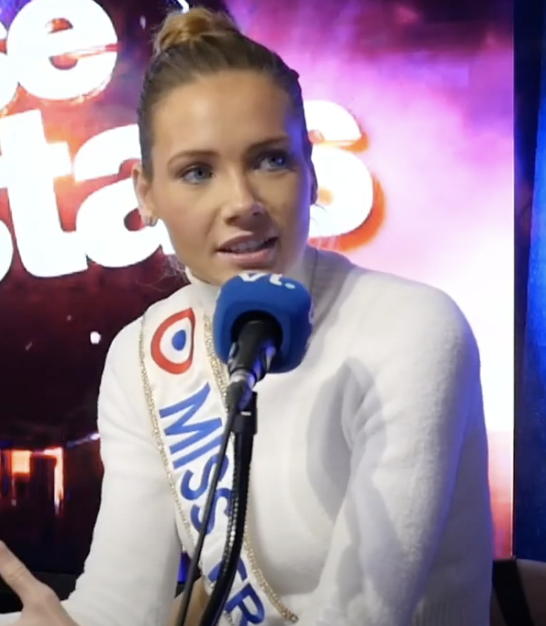
- Born: 30 September 1997 (age 29); Caen, France
- Education: University of Caen Normandy
- Height: 1.75 m (5 ft 9 in)
- Spouse: Julien Georges (m. 2026)
- Beauty pageant titleholder
- Title: Miss Normandy 2020; Miss France 2021
- Hair color: Blonde
- Eye color: Blue
- Major competitions: Miss France 2021 (Winner); Miss Universe 2020 (Top 21)

Amandine Petit (French pronunciation: [amɑ̃din pəti]; born 30 September 1997) is a French model and beauty pageant titleholder who was crowned Miss France 2021. She had previously been crowned Miss Normandy 2020, and is the seventh woman from Normandy to win Miss France. She represented France at Miss Universe 2020, where she placed in the Top 21.

== Early life and education ==
Petit was born in Caen and raised in nearby Bourguébus, a small town in the Calvados department in Normandy. Her parents are Jean-Luc Petit, who works as a civil servant in the prison system, and Nathalie Petit, who works at the tourism office of Caen. Petit also has an older sister named Pauline. Her grandmother and great-grandmother on her maternal side had both formerly been beauty pageant titleholders in the town of Creully. Petit attended school in the Caen area, attending primary school in Bourguébus, collège in Saint-Martin-de-Fontenay, and lycée at Lycée Augustin-Fresnel in Caen.

Petit received a brevet de technicien supérieur (BTS) degree in negotiation and customer service, and later took exams to become a nurse before receiving a Licence 3 degree. Prior to becoming Miss France, Petit was a student at the Institut d'Administration des Entreprises campus in Caen within the University of Caen Normandy, where she was studying for a master's degree in the management of gerontological establishments and structures. Her career goal was to become the director of an établissement d'hébergement pour personnes âgées dépendantes (EHPAD) or retirement home.

== Pageantry ==
=== Miss Normandy ===
Petit was inspired to pursue pageantry at age 17, after meeting Malika Ménard, also from Normandy, who had been crowned Miss France 2010. Ménard encouraged Petit to pursue pageantry and compete in Miss Normandy. She later was the first runner-up of Miss Lower Normandy 2015, which qualified her to compete in Miss Normandy 2015, where she placed as the second runner-up.

Petit returned to pageantry five years later, after she was selected as a candidate for Miss Normandy 2020. She went on to win the title, earning the right to represent Normandy at Miss France 2021. On 23 October 2021, Petit crowned Youssra Askry as her successor at Miss Normandy 2021.

=== Miss France ===
Miss France was held on 19 December 2020 at Puy du Fou, after being postponed one week from its original date due to the COVID-19 pandemic in France. Petit competed in the finals, where she advanced to the top 15 and top five and was ultimately declared the winner, being crowned by outgoing titleholder Clémence Botino of Guadeloupe and becoming the seventh woman from Normandy to win the title. During the competition, Petit placed fourth in the general knowledge exam, scoring 14.5 points out of a maximum of 20. The general knowledge exam is a test on topics such as history, politics, current events, and pop culture, which is given to contestants each year. As Miss France, Petit was awarded a number of prizes and rewards, including more than €57,000 in gifts from sponsors, a year-long residence in a luxury Paris apartment, and an undisclosed monthly salary the equivalent of a senior executive in France.

After winning the title, Petit was given the opportunity to appear at numerous events in France and internationally. She accepted the opportunity to be a contestant in Fort Boyard, a guest at the 2021 French Open and 2021 Cannes Film Festival, and work as a promotional and runway model in cities such as Barcelona and Casablanca. Petit also became a weekly cohost on Virgin Radio, presenting a show intending to entertain the French youth amidst the COVID-19 pandemic. In March 2021, Petit was selected as one of 109 women chosen to portray Marianne in an exhibit unveiled by Marlène Schiappa at the Panthéon.

As Miss France, Petit represented France at Miss Universe 2020, where she placed in the Top 21. She was originally set to represent France at either Miss Universe 2021 or Miss World 2021, but due to potential date conflicts between those pageants and Miss France 2022, she was instead switched to Miss Universe 2020. Petit completed her reign as Miss France on 11 December 2021 at Miss France 2022, where she crowned Diane Leyre of Île-de-France as her successor.

== Post-pageantry ==
In August 2022, Petit was announced as a celebrity contestant in season 12 of Danse avec les stars, the French version of Dancing with the Stars. She was partnered with professional dancer Anthony Colette throughout the competition; the duo were eliminated in the episode aired on 7 October 2022, placing eighth in the competition.

In May 2023, Petit published her first book J'ai décidé d'oser ("I decided to dare"). The book recounts events in Petit's life and her journey to becoming Miss France.

== Personal life ==
In October 2025, Petit announced her engagement to longtime boyfriend Julien Georges. She and Georges remained together throughout her reign as Miss France but chose to keep their relationship out of the spotlight, with Petit stating that Georges "did not choose to be Miss France's boyfriend". Petit and Georges married in June 2026.

Awards and achievements
Preceded by (Guadeloupe) Clémence Botino	Miss France; 2021	Succeeded by (Île-de-France) Diane Leyre
Preceded by (Nord-Pas-de-Calais) Maëva Coucke	Miss Universe France; 2020	Succeeded by (Guadeloupe) Clémence Botino
Preceded by Marine Clautour	Miss Normandy; 2020	Succeeded by Youssra Askry
