= Miss Cameroon =

National beauty pageant

Comité d'organisation Miss Cameroun
- Formation: 1960; 66 years ago
- Type: Beauty pageant
- Headquarters: Yaoundé
- Location: Cameroon
- Members: Miss Universe; Miss World; Miss Cosmo
- Official languages: French
- Chairman: Solange Ingrid
- Website: misscameroun.net

Miss Cameroon (French: Miss Cameroun) is a national Beauty pageant in Cameroon where the winners traditionally go to Miss Universe or Miss World. The current Miss Cameroon 2025 is Audrey Black. She will represent Cameroon at Miss Universe 2026 pageant.

== History ==
The beauty pageant history in Cameroon was held for the first time in 1960 under Ministry of Culture. The Miss Independence pageant happened on 1 January 1960 in Yaounde as Cameroun became an independent republic. Julienne Ayissi Eyenga Fouda is the first beauty queen in Cameroon history.

Established in 2002 the COMICA or Committee of Miss Cameroun happened in Yaounde. The pageant aims to be a tourism promotion of the country. The titleholder also becomes an ambassador who represents all women across the country to celebrate once year in her beauty, intelligence and values. All region winners in Cameroon will compete at Miss Cameroon every year.

=== Miss World Cameroon ===
The COMICA as the main national beauty committee in Cameroon is an official franchise holder to Miss World. Started in 2013 the main winner scheduled to go to Miss World.

=== Miss Universe Cameroon ===
Meanwhile, for Miss Universe, the history has told that there was Miss Universe Cameroon in 1960, Sale Assouen who declined to compete, for unknown reasons. But the COMICA has finally received the license right in 2020. The Miss Universe Cameroon title officially designated from former Miss Cameroon winners who obviously had international pageant experiences.

=== Directorships ===
- Miss Independence by Ministry of Tourism (1960)
- COMICA by Solange Ingrid (2002)
  - Miss Universe (2020―present)
  - Miss World (2013―present)
  - Miss Cosmo (2025―present)
    - Miss Earth (2022―2024)

== Formats ==
The Miss Cameroon competition is traditionally holding region representation every year. The 10 delegates across Cameroon will compete for the crown. In the finale result there will be Second Runner-up, First Runner-up, then finally Miss Cameroon winner.

- Miss Adamawa
- Miss Central
- Miss East
- Miss Far North
- Miss Littoral
- Miss North
- Miss Northwest
- Miss South
- Miss Southwest
- Miss West

== Titleholders ==
Year	Miss Cameroun	Region
1960	Julienne Ayissi Eyenga Fouda	Centre
2002	Diane Ngo Mouaha	Centre
2004	Audrey Béa Mbong	Centre
2005	Florence Rita Iyok	Centre
2007	Marthe Keza Troumba	North
2008	Joëlle Audrey Amboague	East
2009	Anne Lucrèce Ntep	Littoral
2010	Marie Barbara Matagnigni	Centre
2011	Sophie Christine Ngnamgouet	West
2013	Valérie Ayena	Centre
2014	Larissa Ngangoum	Centre
2015	Jessica Ngoua	Littoral
2016	Julia Nguimfack	Centre
2017	Michèle-Ange Minkata	Centre
2018	Aimée Caroline Nseke	Centre
2020	Audrey Monkam	Northwest
2022	Julia Samantha Edima	South
2023	Ndoun Issie Marie Princesse	Littoral
2024	Noura Njikam	Centre
2025	Josiane Harangada Golonga	Far North

=== Wins by region ===
Region	Titles	Years
Centre	10	1960, 2002, 2004, 2005, 2010, 2013, 2014, 2016, 2017, 2018, 2024
Littoral	3	2009, 2015, 2023
North	1	2007
East	1	2008
West	1	2011
Northwest	1	2020
South	1	2022
Far North	1	2025

== Titleholders under Comité d'organisation Miss Cameroun ==
Cameroon has been represented in the Big Four international beauty pageants, the four major international beauty pageants for women. These are Miss World, Miss Universe, Miss International and Miss Earth.

=== Miss Universe Cameroon ===
- : Declared as Winner
- : Ended as runner-up or top 5/6 qualification
- : Ended as one of the finalists or semifinalists
- : Ended as special awards winner

The Miss Universe Cameroon will declare after Miss Cameroon happened by the COMICA. The titleholder usually designates from former Miss Cameroon who experienced at beauty contests. The main winner of Miss Cameroon has also a right to compete at Miss Universe but it depends on Miss Cameroon management team decision.

Year	Region	Miss Universe Cameroon	Placement at Miss Universe	Special awards	Notes
Solange Ingrid directorship — a franchise holder to Miss Universe from 2020
2026	Littoral	Audrey Black	TBA	TBA	
2025	Far North	Josiane Harangada Golonga	Did not compete		
2024	Centre	Noura Raïssa Njikam	Unplaced		
2023	Littoral	Ndoun Issie Marie Princesse	Top 20		
2022	Southwest	Lynette Monalisa "Jelly" Mouketey	Unplaced		The recent winner of Miss Cameroon 2023, Ndoun Issie Marie Princesse allocated to Miss Universe 2023, the 1st Runner-up took over the opportunity. Monalisa went to the New Orleans, Miss Universe 2022.
2021	Centre	Michèle-Ange Sandra Akomo Minkata	Unplaced		
2020	Littoral	Angèle Kossinda Bourmassou	Unplaced		
Miss Independence by Ministry of Tourism directorship — a franchise holder to Miss Universe in 1960
Did not compete between 1961—2019
1960	Centre	Sale Assouen	Did not compete		Cameroon expected to debut from Miss Independence pageant under Ministry of Culture in 1960 but for unknown reasons, the selected queen did not come to Miss Universe. Sale Assouen appointed to fly to the United States after the main winner did not present to Miss Universe pageant.

=== Miss World Cameroon ===
- : Declared as Winner
- : Ended as runner-up or top 5/6 qualification
- : Ended as one of the finalists or semifinalists
- : Ended as special awards winner

The main winner of Miss Cameroon represents Cameroon at Miss World pageant. On occasion, when the winner does not qualify (due to age) for either contest, a runner-up is sent.

Year	Region	Miss World Cameroon	Placement at Miss Universe	Special awards	Notes
Solange Ingrid directorship — a franchise holder to Miss World from 2013
2025	Littoral	Ndoun Issie Marie Princesse	Top 20	Multimedia Challenge Winner	
Miss World 2023 was rescheduled to 2024 due to the change of host and when entering India as the new host, there were several issues that caused the postponement until March 2024.
2023	South	Julia Samantha Edima	Top 40		
Miss World 2021 was rescheduled to 16 March 2022 due to the COVID-19 pandemic outbreak in Puerto Rico, no edition started in 2022.
2021	Northwest	Audrey Nabila Monkam	Top 40	Head to Head Challenge Winner; Miss World Top Model (1st runner-up); Beauty with a Purpose (Top 28)	
Due to the impact of COVID-19 pandemic, no competition held in 2020
Did not compete in 2019
2018	Centre	Aimée Caroline Nseke	Unplaced		
2017	Centre	Michèle-Ange Sandra Akomo Minkata	Unplaced	Miss World Talent (Top 20)	
2016	Centre	Julia Frankline Cheugueu Nguimfack	Did not compete		
2015	Littoral	Jessica Lydie Senjet Ngoua Nseme Lydie	Unplaced	Miss World Top Model (Top 30); People's choice award (Top 10)	
2014	Centre	Larissa Dona Ngangoum	Unplaced		
2013	Centre	Valerie Denise Ayena	Unplaced		

=== Miss Earth Cameroon ===
- : Declared as Winner
- : Ended as runner-up or top 5/6 qualification
- : Ended as one of the finalists or semifinalists
- : Ended as special awards winner

One of the runners-up at Miss Cameroon will be Miss Earth Cameroon. Began 2022 the COMICA has a right to send Cameroonian representation at Miss Earth pageant.

Year	Region	Miss Earth Cameroon	Placement at Miss Earth	Special awards	Notes
Solange Ingrid directorship — a franchise holder to Miss Earth from 2022
2024	Southwest Region	Enanga Tina Randa	Unplaced		
2023	Lebialem	Atem Noella	Unplaced		
2022	Littoral	Prandy Noella	Unplaced		
