= Miss Universe 2021 =

70th edition of the Miss Universe competition

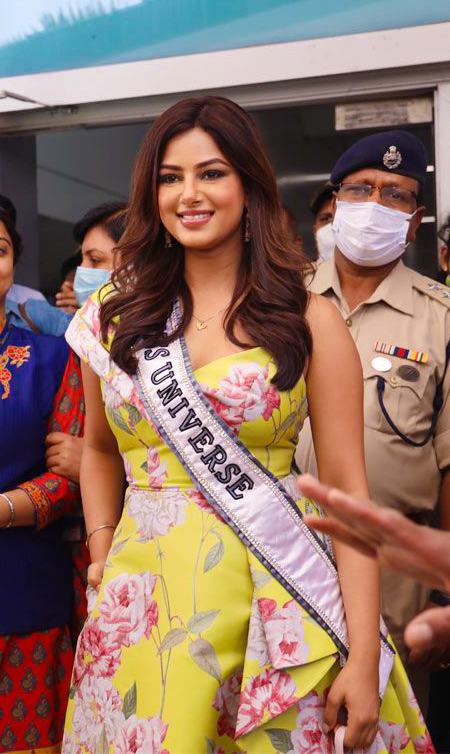
- Harnaaz Sandhu in 2022
- Date: 13 December 2021 (Note: The event was televised live at 02:00 Israel Standard Time (UTC+02:00); for the Americas, this was 12 December in their local times.)
- Presenters: Steve Harvey; Carson Kressley; Cheslie Kryst
- Entertainment: JoJo; Noa Kirel; Harel Skaat; Narkis; Valerie Hamaty
- Venue: Universe Dome, Port of Eilat, Eilat, Israel
- Broadcaster: International: Fox; Telemundo; Official broadcaster: yes
- Entrants: 80
- Placements: 16
- Debuts: Bahrain
- Withdrawals: Barbados; Belize; Indonesia; Malaysia; Myanmar; Uruguay
- Returns: Equatorial Guinea; Germany; Greece; Guatemala; Hungary; Kenya; Morocco; Namibia; Nigeria; Sweden; Turkey
- Winner: Harnaaz Sandhu; India
- Best National Costume: Maristella Okpala, Nigeria

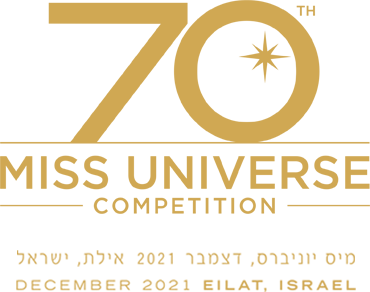
70th anniversary logo

Miss Universe 2021 was the 70th Miss Universe pageant, held at the Universe Dome in Eilat, Israel, on 13 December 2021.

Harnaaz Sandhu of India won the competition, succeeding Andrea Meza of Mexico. It was India's first victory in twenty-one years, and the third in the country's in the pageant history. Sandhu became the first ever Sikh to win the title.

Contestants from 80 countries and territories competed in the pageant. Steve Harvey returned as the host; Harvey last served as host during Miss Universe 2019. Miss USA 2019, Cheslie Kryst, and Carson Kressley served as backstage correspondents. JoJo, Noa Kirel, Harel Skaat, Valerie Hamaty, and Narkis performed in this year's pageant.

Fox returned as the official broadcaster of the show after being absent for the previous edition. It was broadcast to hundreds of millions of viewers in 172 countries. This was also the final edition to be aired on an American broadcast television network.

== Location and date ==
In January 2021, the Miss Universe Organization was reportedly in talks to host the 2021 edition of the competition in Costa Rica in late 2021 or early 2022. The negotiations were later confirmed by Gustavo Segura, serving as the Minister of Tourism in the government of Costa Rica. In May 2021, in her first interview to People en Español after her coronation, Andrea Meza stated that the next edition of the pageant could possibly take place at the end of 2021. She also acknowledged the fact that her reign would be one of the shortest in the history of the pageant. (Note: Andrea Meza's reign would be the shortest to complete her reign. Oxana Fedorova, the original winner of Miss Universe 2002, remains the shortest reign in the organization's history but was soon dethroned to pass the title to the first runner-up.)

Two months after the interview, the Miss Universe Organization confirmed that the competition would be in Eilat, Israel in December 2021. On 27 October 2021, the pageant was confirmed to be on 12 December 2021, at the Universe Dome, a custom-built and temporary arena imported to Eilat from Portugal. Also announced was that the chosen venue was to work with maximum capacity (5,000 spectators) to avoid precautious concerns on a potential COVID-19 resurgence, after the 2020 pageant (held in May 2021) was scaled down to 1,750 spectators (nearly one-quarter of the venue capacity) due to the ongoing worldwide COVID-19 pandemic.

== Selection of participants ==
Contestants from 80 countries and territories were selected to compete in the competition. Twenty-seven of these delegates were appointees to their positions after being a runner-up of their national pageant or being selected through a casting process, while two were selected to replace the original dethroned winner.

=== Replacements ===
Miss France 2021, Amandine Petit, was initially supposed to compete, while Miss France 2020, Clémence Botino, was supposed to compete in Miss Universe 2020. A switch happened between the two delegates due to a potential date conflict between Miss Universe 2021 and Miss France 2022, at which Petit was contractually obligated to be present. Debbie Aflalo, originally the first runner-up of Miss Dominican Republic 2021, was appointed to represent the country after the original winner, Andreína Martínez, tested positive for COVID-19 shortly before her scheduled departure. Kawtar Benhalima, originally the first runner-up of Miss Universe Morocco 2021, was appointed to represent the country after the original winner, Fatima-Zahra Khayat, was injured in a car accident.

=== Debuts, returns, and withdrawals ===
This edition marked the debut of Bahrain, and saw the returns of Equatorial Guinea, Germany, Greece, Guatemala, Hungary, Kenya, Morocco, Namibia, Nigeria, Sweden, and Turkey; Morocco last competed in 1978, which makes the country's first time to compete after four decades of absence from Miss Universe, Greece, Guatemala, and Hungary last competed in 2018, while the others last competed in 2019. Barbados, Belize, Indonesia, and Malaysia withdrew for travel restrictions while Myanmar and Uruguay withdrew for undisclosed reasons. Expected to debut in the competition was the United Arab Emirates, but plans changed following the cancellation of its national pageant.

=== Incidents before the competition ===
Miss South Africa 2021, Lalela Mswane, refused to withdraw from the pageant after pressure from the South African government. Minister of Arts, Sport and Culture, Nathi Mthethwa, announced that the government refused to associate itself with the pageant as "the atrocities committed by Israel against Palestinians are well documented."

Clémence Botino of France, later tested positive for COVID-19 upon arriving in Israel, and was taken to a government isolation hotel. She had been fully vaccinated, and had tested upon departure. Botino was released from quarantine after ten days and was authorized to rejoin the competition.

== Results ==
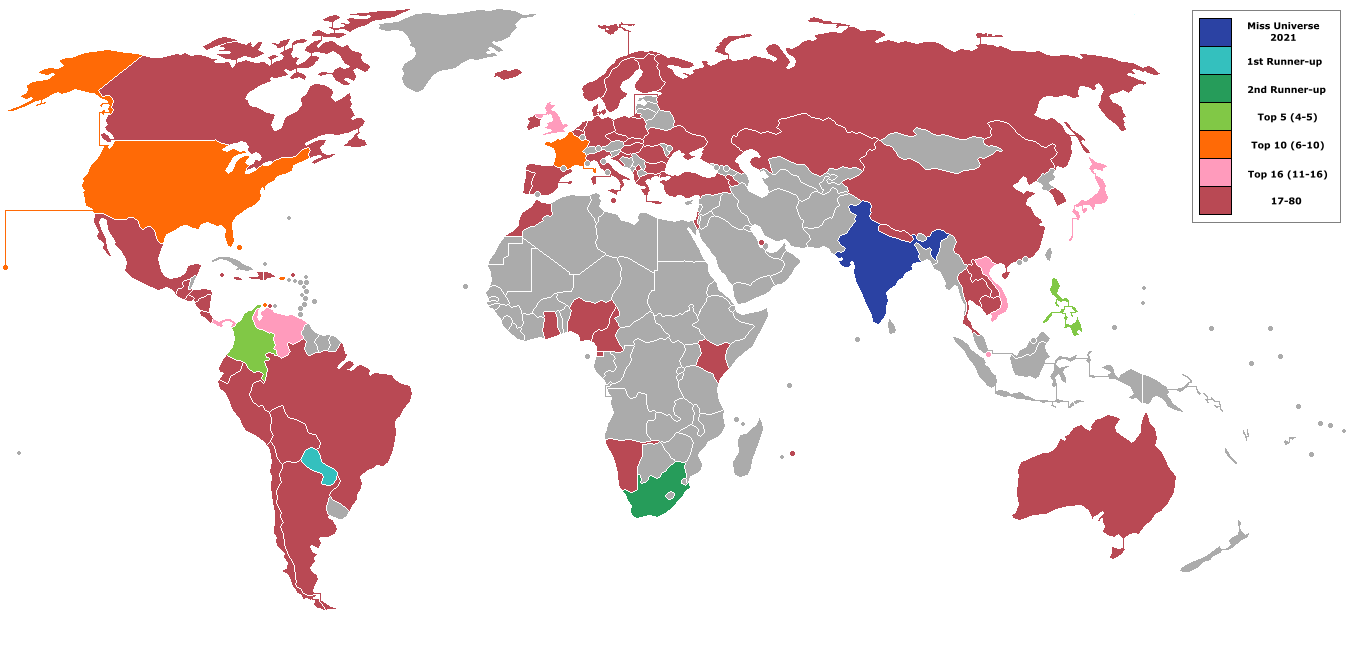
Results map of Miss Universe 2021

=== Placements ===
Placement	Contestant
Miss Universe 2021	India – Harnaaz Sandhu
1st Runner-Up	Paraguay – Nadia Ferreira
2nd Runner-Up	South Africa – Lalela Mswane
Top 5	Colombia – Valeria Ayos; Philippines – Beatrice Gomez
Top 10	Aruba – Thessaly Zimmerman; Bahamas – Chantel O'Brian; France – Clémence Botino; Puerto Rico – Michelle Colón; United States – Elle Smith
Top 16	Great Britain – Emma Collingridge; Japan – Juri Watanabe; Panama – Brenda Smith; Singapore – Nandita Banna; Venezuela – Luiseth Materán; Vietnam – Kim Duyên Nguyễn §

§ - Voted into the Top 16 by viewers

=== Special awards ===
Award	Contestant
Best National Costume	Nigeria – Maristella Okpala
Fan Vote Winner	Vietnam – Kim Duyên Nguyễn
Social Impact Award	Chile – Antonia Figueroa
Spirit of Carnival Award	Bahamas – Chantel O'Brian

== Pageant ==
=== Format ===
The Miss Universe Organization introduced several specific changes to the format for this edition. The number of semifinalists was reduced to sixteen— the same number of semifinalists in 2017. The results of the preliminary competition— which consisted of the swimsuit and evening gown competition, and the closed-door interview, determined the sixteen semifinalists selected at large. The internet voting is still being implemented, with fans being able to vote for another delegate to advance into the semifinals. The sixteen semifinalists competed in the swimsuit competition and were narrowed down to ten afterward. The ten semifinalists competed in the evening gown competition and were narrowed down to five afterward. The five finalists competed in the preliminary question and answer round, and the final three was chosen. The final word portion was brought back, after which Miss Universe 2021 and her two runners-up were announced.

=== Selection committee ===
- Lori Harvey – American model and daughter of Steve Harvey
- Adriana Lima – Brazilian model
- Adamari López – Puerto Rican actress
- Iris Mittenaere – Miss Universe 2016 from France
- Urvashi Rautela – Indian actress and Miss Universe India 2015
- Marian Rivera – Filipino actress and model
- Rena Sofer – American actress (only as final telecast judge)
- Cheslie Kryst – American television presenter and Miss USA 2019 (only as preliminary judge)
- Rina Mor – Miss Universe 1976 from Israel (only as preliminary judge)

== Contestants ==
A total of 80 contestants competed for the title.

Country/Territory	Contestant	Age (Note: Ages at the time of the pageant)	Hometown
Albania	Ina Dajçi	27	Tirana
Argentina	Julieta García	22	Bahía Blanca
Armenia	Nane Avetisyan	24	Yerevan
Aruba	Thessaly Zimmerman	27	Oranjestad
Australia	Daria Varlamova	27	Melbourne
The Bahamas	Chantel O'Brian	27	Nassau
Bahrain	Manar Deyani	25	Riffa
Belgium	Kedist Deltour	24	Nazareth
Bolivia	Nahemi Uequin	20	Santa Cruz
Brazil	Teresa Santos	23	Maranguape
British Virgin Islands	Xaria Penn	18	Tortola
Bulgaria	Elena Danova	21	Krichim
Cambodia	Marady Ngin	22	Phnom Penh
Cameroon	Michèle-Ange Minkata	27	Yaoundé
Canada	Tamara Jemuovic	27	Toronto
Cayman Islands	Georgina Kerford	18	George Town
Chile	Antonia Figueroa	26	La Serena
China	Shiyin Yang	20	Beijing
Colombia	Valeria Ayos	27	Cartagena
Costa Rica	Valeria Rees	28	Heredia
Croatia	Ora Ivanišević	20	Dubrovnik
Curaçao	Shariëngela Cijntje	27	Willemstad
Czech Republic	Karolína Kokešová	25	Prague
Denmark	Sara Langtved	26	Copenhagen
Dominican Republic	Debbie Aflalo	27	Azua
Ecuador	Susy Sacoto	24	Portoviejo
El Salvador	Alejandra Gavidia	25	San Salvador
Equatorial Guinea	Martina Mituy	19	Ebibeyin
Finland	Essi Unkuri	23	Vaasa
France	Clémence Botino	24	Baie-Mahault
Germany	Hannah Seifer	19	Düsseldorf
Ghana	Naa Commodore	26	Accra
(United Kingdom) Great Britain	Emma Collingridge	23	Suffolk
Greece	Sofia Arapogianni	22	Ithaca
Guatemala	Dannia Guevara	24	Ayutla
Haiti	Pascale Belony	28	Cap-Haïtien
Honduras	Rose Meléndez	27	Limón
Hungary	Jázmin Viktória	20	Budapest
Iceland	Elísa Steinþórsdóttir	22	Garðabær
India	Harnaaz Sandhu	21	Chandigarh
(Republic of Ireland) Ireland	Katharine Walker	26	Belfast
Israel	Noa Cochva	22	Bnei Atarot
Italy	Caterina di Fuccia	23	Marcianise
Jamaica	Daena Soares	22	Mona
Japan	Juri Watanabe	25	Tokyo
Kazakhstan	Aziza Tokashova	27	Almaty
Kenya	Roshanara Ebrahim	28	Nairobi
Kosovo	Shkurtesa Sejdiu	19	Gjilan
Laos	Tonkham Phonchanheuang	26	Vientiane
Malta	Jade Cini	26	Valletta
Mauritius	Anne Murielle Ravina	26	Rodrigues
Mexico	Débora Hallal	25	Los Mochis
Morocco	Kawtar Benhalima	22	Marrakesh
Namibia	Chelsi Shikongo	24	Walvis Bay
Nepal	Sujita Basnet	28	Kathmandu
Netherlands	Julia Sinning	24	Amsterdam
Nicaragua	Allison Wassmer	26	Managua
Nigeria	Maristella Okpala	28	Anambra
Norway	Nora Nakken	23	Trondheim
Panama	Brenda Smith	27	Panama City
Paraguay	Nadia Ferreira	22	Villarrica
Peru	Yely Rivera	27	Arequipa
Philippines	Beatrice Gomez	26	Cebu City
Poland	Agata Wdowiak	25	Łódź
Portugal	Orícia dos Santos	27	Lisbon
Puerto Rico	Michelle Colón	21	Loíza
Romania	Carmina Cotfas	21	Cluj-Napoca
Russia	Ralina Arabova	22	Kazan
Singapore	Nandita Banna	21	Singapore
Slovakia	Veronika Ščepánková	26	Bratislava
South Africa	Lalela Mswane	24	Richards Bay
South Korea	Jisu Kim	23	Seoul
Spain	Sarah Loinaz	23	San Sebastián
Sweden	Moa Sandberg	25	Stockholm
Thailand	Anchilee Scott-Kemmis	22	Chachoengsao
Turkey	Cemrenaz Turhan	23	Istanbul
Ukraine	Hannah Neplyakh	27	Dnipro
United States	Elle Smith	23	Louisville
Venezuela	Luiseth Materán	25	Los Teques
Vietnam	Kim Duyên Nguyễn	26	Cần Thơ
