= Miss Universe 2020 =

69th edition of the Miss Universe competition

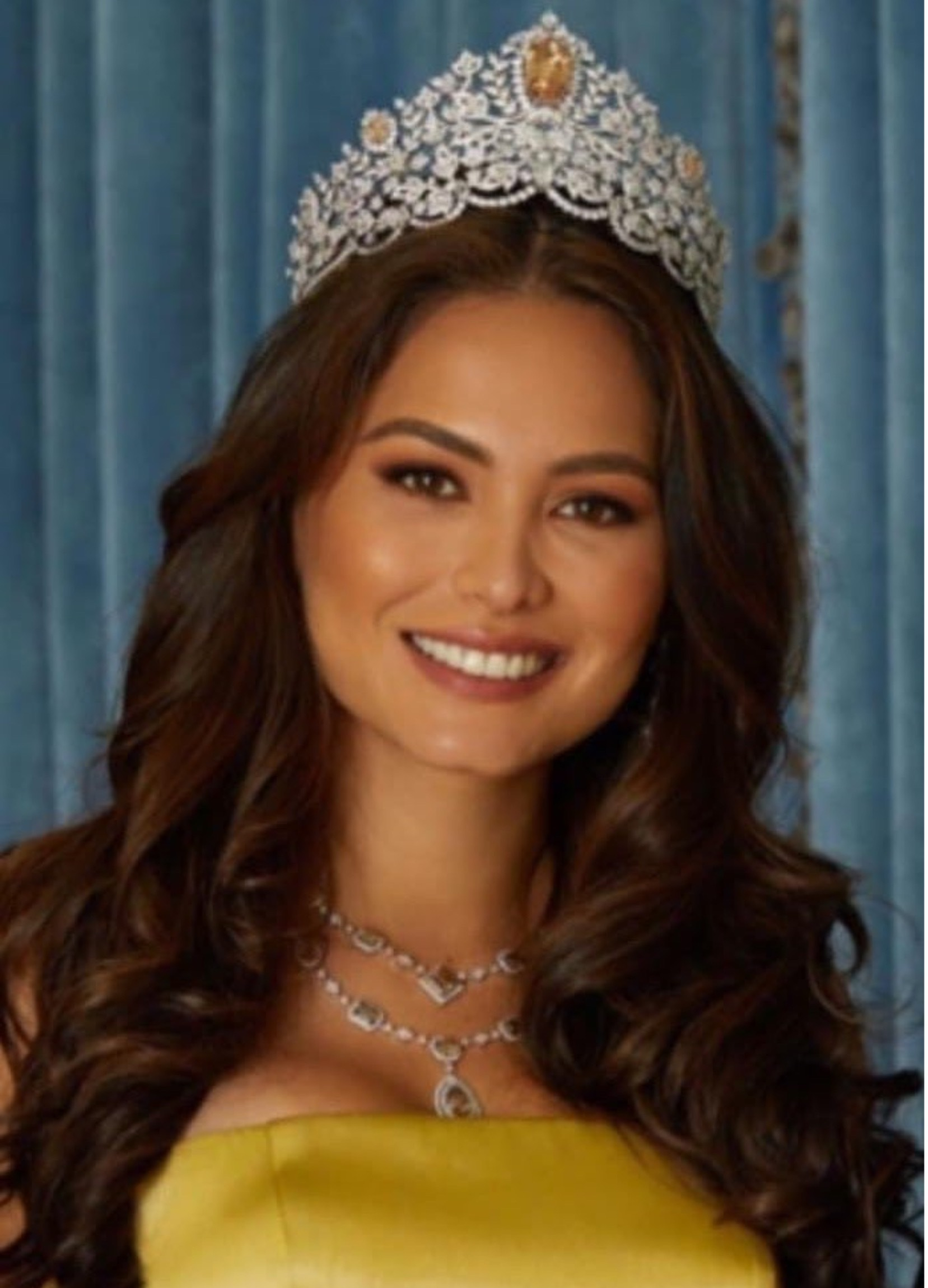
- Andrea Meza
- Date: 16 May 2021
- Presenters: Mario Lopez; Olivia Culpo; Demi-Leigh Tebow; Paulina Vega; Cheslie Kryst
- Entertainment: Luis Fonsi
- Venue: Seminole Hard Rock Hotel & Casino, Hollywood, Florida, United States
- Broadcaster: Television: FYI; Telemundo; Streaming: Roku
- Entrants: 74
- Placements: 21
- Debuts: Cameroon
- Withdrawals: Angola; Bangladesh; Egypt; Equatorial Guinea; Georgia; Germany; Guam; Kenya; Lithuania; Mongolia; Namibia; New Zealand; Nigeria; Saint Lucia; Sierra Leone; Sweden; Tanzania; Turkey; United States Virgin Islands
- Returns: Ghana; Russia
- Winner: Andrea Meza; Mexico
- Best National Costume: Thuzar Wint Lwin, Myanmar

Miss Universe 2020 was the 69th Miss Universe pageant, held at the Seminole Hard Rock Hotel & Casino in Hollywood, Florida, United States, on 16 May 2021.

Andrea Meza of Mexico won the competition, succeeding Zozibini Tunzi of South Africa. It was Mexico's first victory in ten years and the third victory for the country in the pageant's history.

Contestants from 74 countries and territories competed in this year's pageant, featuring the smallest number of candidates at the pageant since 2003. The competition was hosted by Mario Lopez and Miss Universe 2012, Olivia Culpo. Miss Universe 2014, Paulina Vega and Miss Universe 2017, Demi-Leigh Tebow served as expert analysts, while Miss USA 2019, Cheslie Kryst served as a backstage correspondent. Puerto Rican singer, Luis Fonsi performed in this year's pageant.

This edition, to date, is the only time the pageant has been broadcast on FYI after Fox, its regular broadcaster, backed out due to uncertainties related to the COVID-19 pandemic.

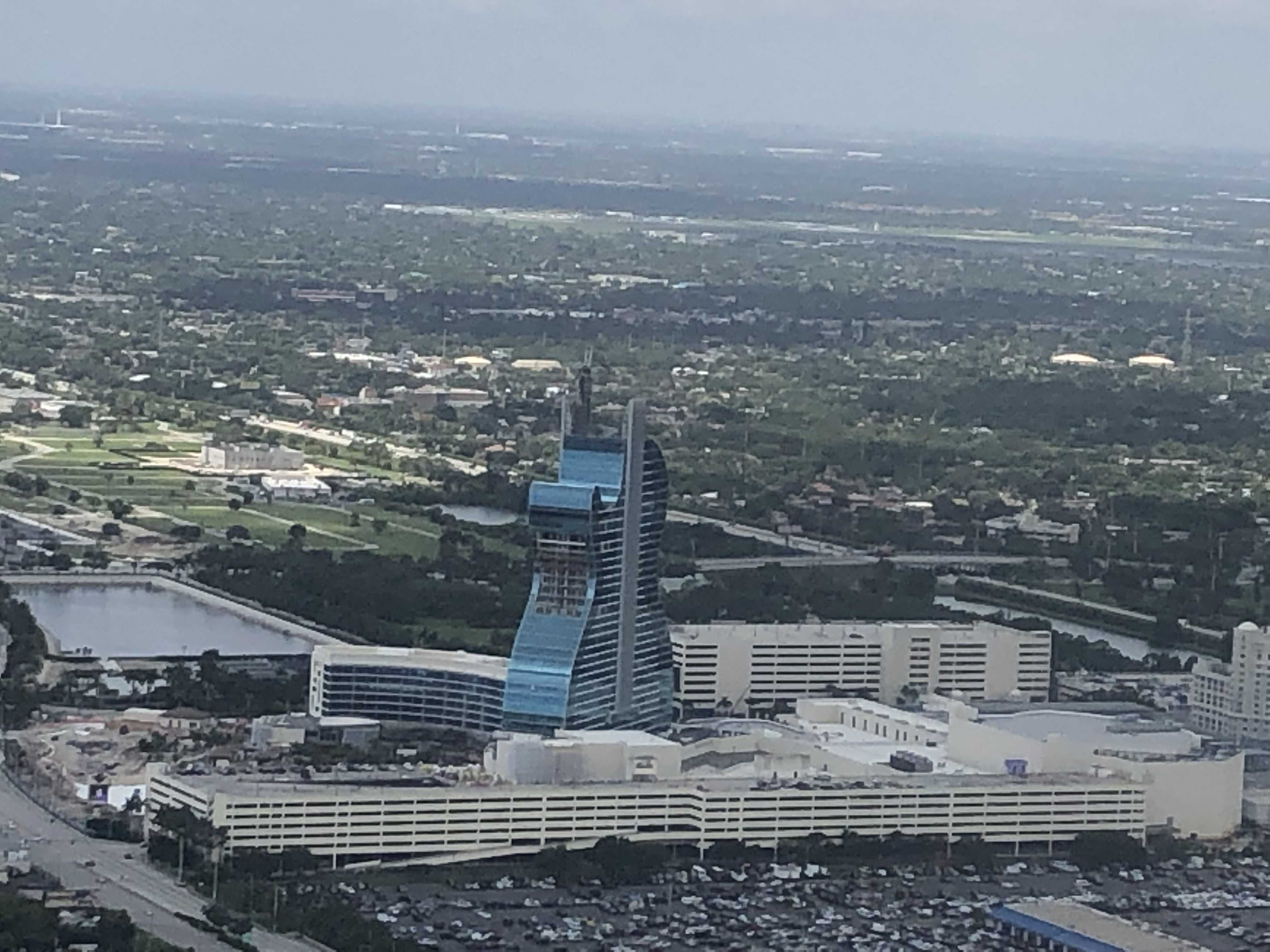
Seminole Hard Rock Hotel & Casino in Hollywood, Florida, the venue of Miss Universe 2020.

== Location and date ==
On 3 March 2021, the Miss Universe Organization announced that the competition would be at the Seminole Hard Rock Hotel & Casino in Hollywood, Florida, United States, on 16 May 2021. Denying rumors that the pageant would be canceled or that the first runner-up in the previous pageant Madison Anderson from Puerto Rico would be crowned Miss Universe 2020.

Due to the COVID-19 pandemic, the competition was postponed three times between November 2020 and May 2021. This edition was the third time in the pageant's history that the event was held after the calendar year ended; this previously occurred during Miss Universe 2014 and Miss Universe 2016, when both took place in January of the following year. The 2020 edition in May of the following year makes it the latest edition in the competition's history. Due to the pandemic, this edition only allowed 1,750 spectators, around a quarter of the venue's seating capacity.

== Selection of participants ==
Contestants from 74 countries and territories were selected to compete in the pageant. Due to the pandemic, numerous national pageants were postponed or canceled entirely, resulting in multiple former runners-up or participants from previous national pageants being appointed or casting processes taking place instead. Twenty-eight of the delegates were in this condition and they were: Argentina, Armenia, Aruba, Barbados, Belize, the British Virgin Islands, Bulgaria, Cameroon, the Cayman Islands, Curaçao, the Czech Republic, Denmark, the Dominican Republic, Ghana, Haiti, Honduras, Kazakhstan, Laos, Mauritius, Panama, Portugal, Puerto Rico, Singapore, Slovakia, South Korea, and Ukraine.

=== Replacements ===
Three contestants were designated after the withdrawal of the original contestant. Miss Belgium 2020, Céline van Ouytsel, was expected to represent her country but was replaced by the second runner-up of Miss Belgium 2018, Dhenia Covens, due to the COVID-19 pandemic in the United States. Miss France 2021, Amandine Petit, was appointed to represent France instead of Miss France 2020, Clémence Botino. The switch happened due to a potential dates conflict between Miss Universe 2021 and Miss France 2022 in December 2021. Botino competed in the 70th edition of the pageant. Miss Polski 2019, Magdalena Kasiborska, was expected to represent Poland but was forced to withdraw after suffering from a spinal disc herniation. She was replaced by the first runner-up of Miss Polski 2019, Natalia Piguła.

Señorita Colombia 2019, María Fernanda Aristizábal, was originally scheduled to participate in this edition, but she was replaced as the Miss Colombia Organization lost the franchise to Miss Universe in June 2020. A new organization called Miss Universe Colombia, led by Natalie Ackermann, became in charge of selecting the representative for Miss Universe. Laura Olascuaga was the winner of the first edition of the pageant and represented Colombia in Miss Universe. On April 6, 2022, due to a change in the Miss Universe rules, Aristizábal was appointed Miss Universe Colombia 2022 and represented Colombia at Miss Universe 2022.

=== Debuts, returns, and withdrawals ===
This edition marked the debut of Cameroon and the returns of Ghana and Russia, which last competed in 2018.

Tangia Methila of Bangladesh withdrew from the competition less than a month prior due to the COVID-19 pandemic in Bangladesh and the imposition of additional lockdowns and travel restrictions. Aya Abdelrazik of Egypt withdrew for undisclosed reasons. In addition to Bangladesh and Egypt, seventeen other countries and territories withdrew due to the franchise owners change or the restrictions caused by the pandemics including Angola, Equatorial Guinea, Georgia, Germany, Guam, Kenya, Lithuania, Mongolia, Namibia, New Zealand, Nigeria, Saint Lucia, Sierra Leone, Sweden, Tanzania, Turkey, and the United States Virgin Islands. The withdrawal of Germany marked the first time it had not competed in the competition since its debut in 1952.

== Results ==
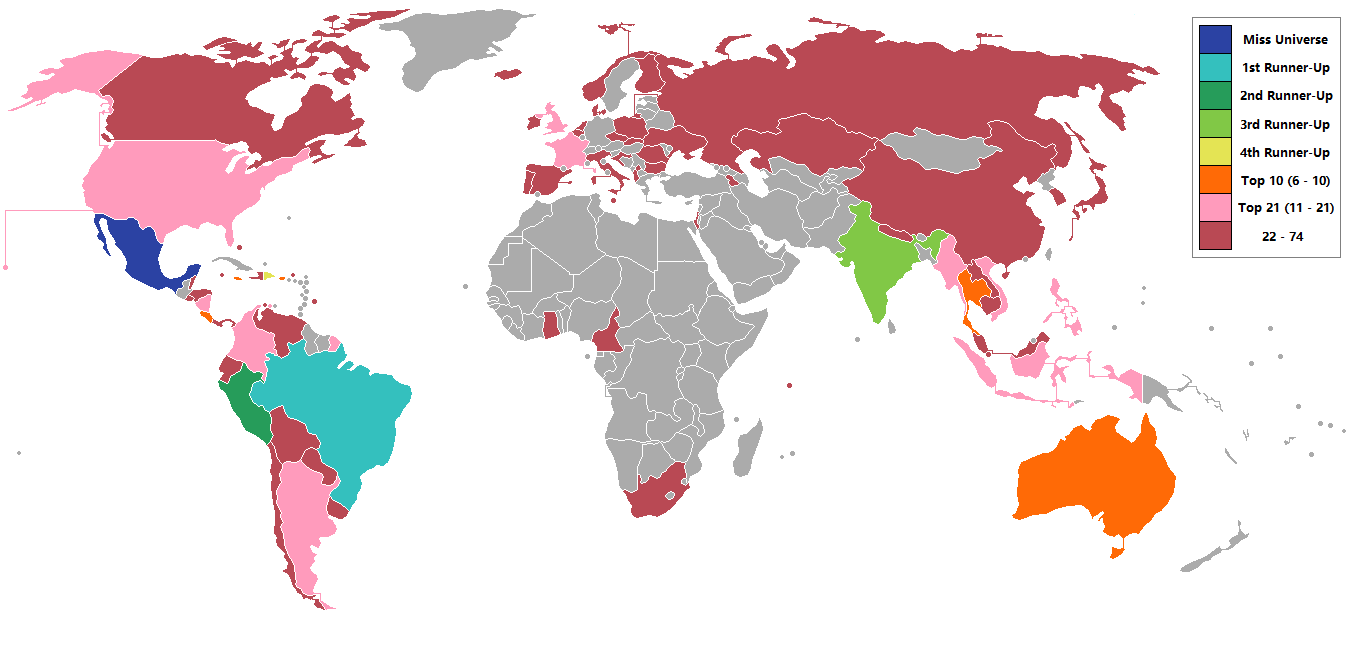
Miss Universe 2020 participating countries and territories.

=== Placements ===
Placement	Contestant
Miss Universe 2020	Mexico – Andrea Meza
1st Runner-Up	Brazil – Julia Gama
2nd Runner-Up	Peru – Janick Maceta
3rd Runner-Up	India – Adline Castelino
4th Runner-Up	Dominican Republic – Kimberly Jiménez
Top 10	Australia – Maria Thattil; Costa Rica – Ivonne Cerdas; Jamaica – Miqueal-Symone Williams; Puerto Rico – Estefanía Soto; Thailand – Amanda Obdam
Top 21	Argentina – Alina Akselrad; Colombia – Laura Olascuaga; Curaçao – Chantal Wiertz; France – Amandine Petit; Great Britain – Jeanette Akua; Indonesia – Ayu Maulida; Myanmar – Thuzar Wint Lwin; Nicaragua – Ana Marcelo; Philippines – Rabiya Mateo; United States – Asya Branch; Vietnam – Khánh Vân Nguyễn §

§ – Voted into the Top 21 by viewers

=== Special awards ===
Award	Contestant
Best National Costume	Myanmar – Thuzar Wint Lwin
Fan Vote Winner	Vietnam – Khánh Vân Nguyễn
Social Impact Award	Bolivia – Lenka Nemer
Spirit of Carnival Award	Dominican Republic – Kimberly Jiménez

== Pageant ==
=== Format ===
Due to restrictive measures related to the COVID-19 pandemic, the Miss Universe Organization implemented specific changes to the format of this edition. The number of semi-finalists was increased to twenty-one—the biggest since the pageant's inception in 1952. The results of the preliminary competition and closed-door interviews determined the twenty semi-finalists. The semi-finalists were selected in a round-robin system instead of the continental format used between 2017 and 2019. Internet voting returned, with fans being able to vote for one candidate to advance into the semi-finals, making the number of semi-finalists twenty-one. The twenty-one semi-finalists then competed directly in the swimsuit competition and were narrowed down to ten afterward. The ten semi-finalists competed in the evening gown competition, and the five finalists were later announced. The five finalists competed in the question-and-answer round and the closing statement.

=== Selection committee ===
- Sheryl Adkins-Green – American marketing executive
- Arden Cho – American actress
- Christine Duffy – American businesswoman
- Keltie Knight – Canadian television host
- Brook Lee – Miss Universe 1997 from the United States
- Deepica Mutyala – American entrepreneur
- Tatyana Orozco – Colombian businesswoman
- Zuleyka Rivera – Miss Universe 2006 from Puerto Rico

== Contestants ==
Seventy-four contestants competed for the title.

Country/Territory	Contestant	Age (Note: Ages at the time of the pageant)	Hometown
Albania	Paula Mehmetukaj	23	Tirana
Argentina	Alina Akselrad	22	Córdoba
Armenia	Monika Grigoryan	21	Yerevan
Aruba	Helen Hernandez	20	Oranjestad
Australia	Maria Thattil	28	Melbourne
Bahamas	Shauntae Miller	28	Long Island
Barbados	Hillary-Ann Williams	25	Christ Church
Belgium	Dhenia Covens	27	Antwerp
Belize	Iris Salguero	24	San Pedro
Bolivia	Lenka Nemer	24	La Paz
Brazil	Julia Gama	27	Porto Alegre
British Virgin Islands	Shabree Frett	24	Tortola
Bulgaria	Radinela Chusheva	25	Sofia
Cambodia	Sarita Reth	26	Phnom Penh
Cameroon	Angèle Kossinda	28	Douala
Canada	Nova Stevens	28	Vancouver
Cayman Islands	Mariah Tibbetts	27	Bodden Town
Chile	Daniela Nicolás	28	Copiapó
China	Jiaxin Sun	23	Beijing
Colombia	Laura Olascuaga	25	Cartagena
Costa Rica	Ivonne Cerdas	28	San José
Croatia	Mirna Marić	22	Zadar
Curaçao	Chantal Wiertz	22	Willemstad
Czech Republic	Klára Vavrušková	21	Kostelec nad Orlicí
Denmark	Amanda Petri	23	Copenhagen
Dominican Republic	Kimberly Jiménez	24	La Romana
Ecuador	Leyla Espinoza	25	Quevedo
El Salvador	Vanessa Velásquez	25	San Salvador
Finland	Viivi Altonen	24	Tampere
France	Amandine Petit	23	Caen
Ghana	Chelsea Tayui	25	Keta
Great Britain	Jeanette Akua	29	London
Haiti	Eden Berandoive	24	Aquin
Honduras	Cecilia Rossell	25	Copan Ruinas
Iceland	Elísabet Snorradóttir	22	Reykjavík
India	Adline Castelino	22	Udupi
Indonesia	Ayu Maulida	23	Surabaya
Ireland	Nadia Sayers	26	Belfast
Israel	Tehila Levi	19	Yavne
Italy	Viviana Vizzini	27	Caltanissetta
Jamaica	Miqueal-Symone Williams	24	Mona
Japan	Aisha Tochigi	25	Chiba
Kazakhstan	Kamilla Serikbay	18	Kyzylorda
Kosovo	Blerta Veseli	23	Gjilan
Laos	Christina Lasasimma	27	Vientiane
Malaysia	Francisca Luhong James	25	Kuching
Malta	Anthea Zammit	26	Żebbuġ
Mauritius	Vandana Jeetah	29	Flacq
Mexico	Andrea Meza	26	Chihuahua City
Myanmar	Thuzar Wint Lwin	22	Hakha
Nepal	Anshika Sharma	24	Jhapa
Netherlands	Denise Speelman	24	Groningen
Nicaragua	Ana Marcelo	24	Estelí
Norway	Sunniva Frigstad	21	Vennesla
Panama	Carmen Jaramillo	26	La Chorrera
Paraguay	Vanessa Castro	28	Asunción
Peru	Janick Maceta	27	Lima
Philippines	Rabiya Mateo	24	Balasan
Poland	Natalia Piguła	27	Łódź
Portugal	Cristiana Silva	19	Porto
Puerto Rico	Estefanía Soto	29	San Sebastian
Romania	Bianca Tirsin	22	Arad
Russia	Alina Sanko	22	Azov
Singapore	Bernadette Ong	26	Bukit Timah
Slovakia	Natália Hoštáková	26	Bratislava
South Africa	Natasha Joubert	23	Centurion
South Korea	Hari Park	21	Incheon
Spain	Andrea Martínez	27	Leon
Thailand	Amanda Obdam	27	Phuket
Ukraine	Yelyzaveta Yastremska	28	Kyiv
United States	Asya Branch	23	Booneville
Uruguay	Lola de los Santos	23	Paysandú
Venezuela	Mariángel Villasmil	25	Ciudad Ojeda
Vietnam	Khánh Vân Nguyễn	26	Ho Chi Minh City
