= Bourguébus =

- Commune
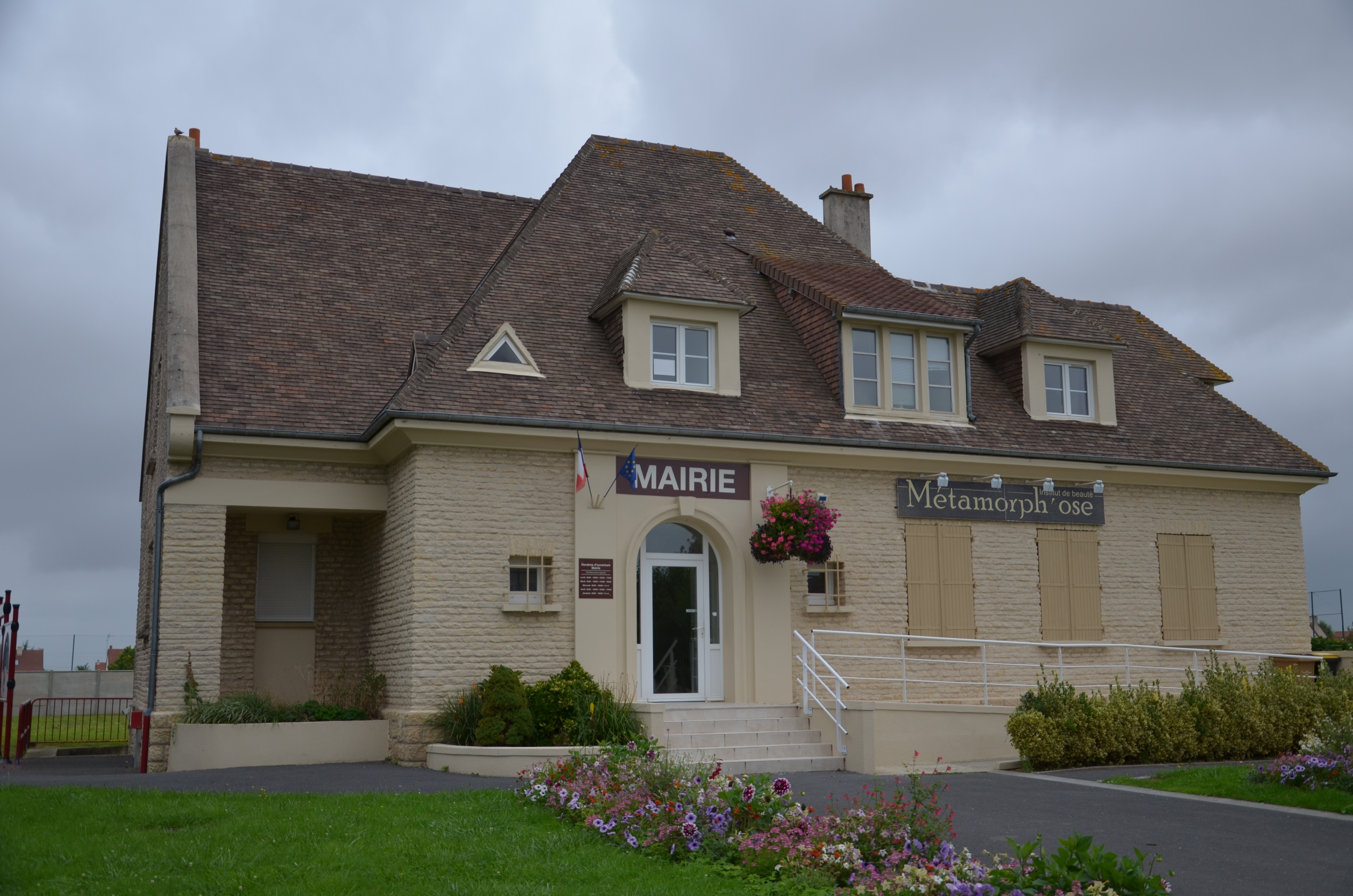
- Town hall
- Location of Bourguébus
- Location within France Location within Normandy
- Coordinates: 49°07′20″N 0°17′47″W
- Country: France
- Region: Normandy
- Department: Calvados
- Arrondissement: Caen
- Canton: Évrecy
- Intercommunality: CU Caen la Mer

Government
  - Mayor (2020–2026): Sébastien François
- Area^{1}: 5.52 km^{2} (2.13 sq mi)
- Elevation: 50 m (160 ft)
- Highest elevation: 73 m (240 ft)
- Lowest elevation: 40 m (130 ft)
- Population (2023): 2,613
  - Density: 473/km^{2} (1,230/sq mi)
- Time zone: UTC+01:00 (CET)
  - Summer (DST): UTC+02:00 (CEST)
- INSEE/Postal code: 14092 /14540
- ^{1} French Land Register data, which excludes lakes, ponds, glaciers > 1 km^{2} (0.386 sq mi or 247 acres) and river estuaries.

Bourguébus (French pronunciation: [buʁɡeby]) is a commune in the Calvados department in the Normandy region in northwestern France.

== Geography ==
The commune is made up of the following collection of villages and hamlets, La Hogue and Bourguébus.

== Population ==
Historical population
Year	Pop.	±% p.a.
1968	342	—
1975	616	+8.77%
1982	650	+0.77%
1990	663	+0.25%
1999	1,074	+5.51%
2007	1,312	+2.53%
2012	1,520	+2.99%
2017	2,016	+5.81%
2023	2,613	+4.42%
Source: INSEE

== Notable people ==
- Amandine Petit - (born 1997) is a model and beauty pageant titleholder who was crowned Miss France 2021 and was raised in this commune.

== See also ==
- Communes of the Calvados department
