= Camaïeu (company) =

French retail clothing company

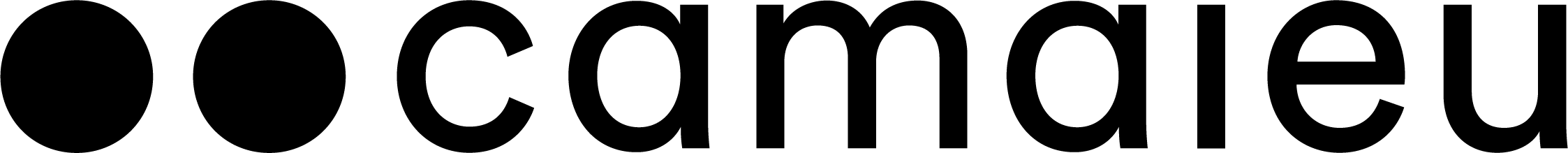

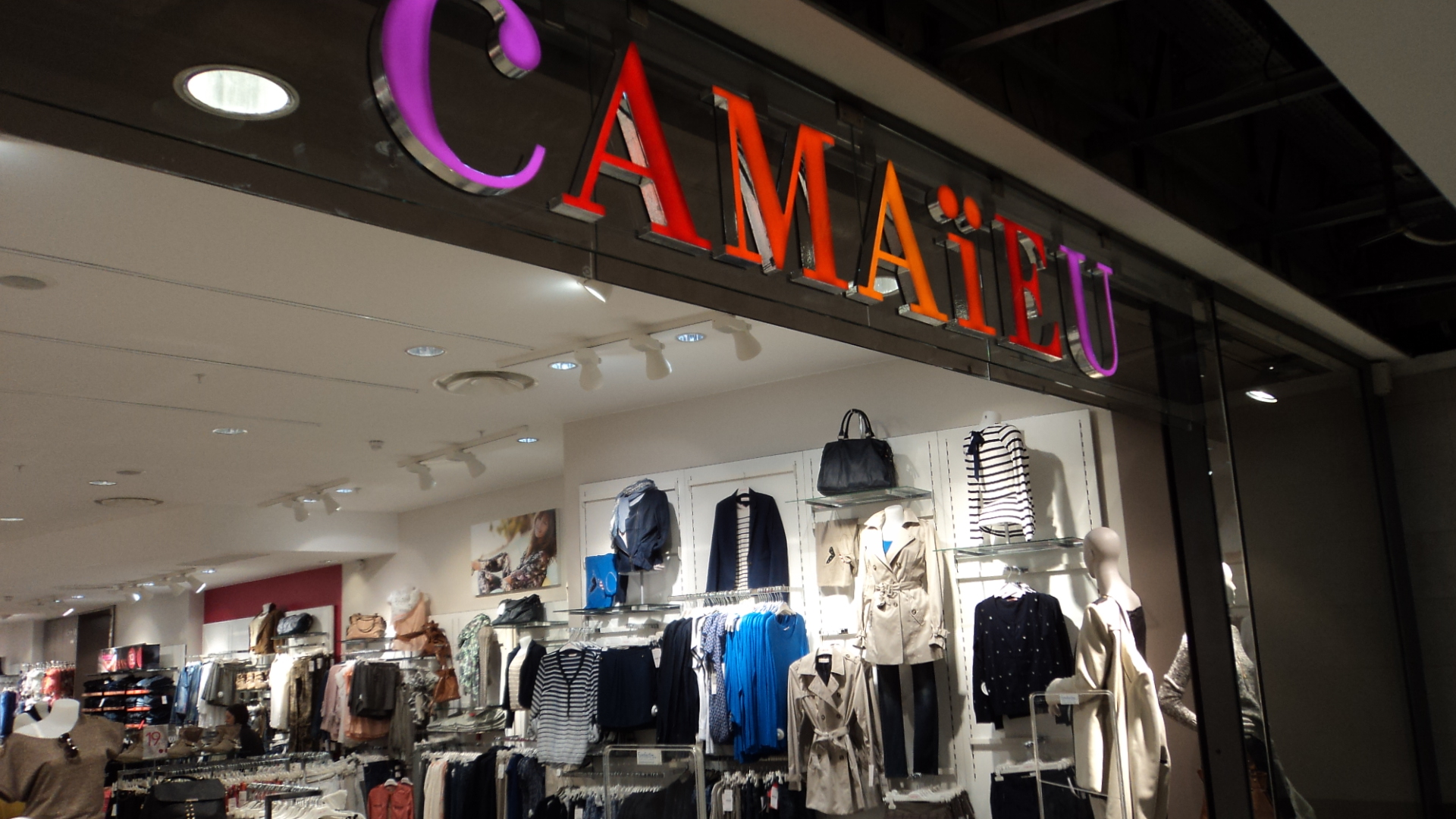
- Industry: Retail
- Founded: Roubaix, France 1984
- Defunct: October 1, 2022
- Headquarters: France
- Key people: Elizabeth Cunin (CEO)
- Owner: HPB
- Number of employees: 2,571 (2022)

Camaïeu (French pronunciation: [kamajø]) was a French retail clothing company which manufactured and sold its own collections of women's clothing.

== Operations ==
Mainly aimed towards women 20 to 40 years old, the company operated a chain of boutiques in Belgium, Czech Republic (to 2020), France, Hungary (to 2020), Italy (to 2020), Morocco, Poland (to 2020), Romania, Russia, Slovakia (to 2020) and Spain. In 2007, the company opened its 600th boutique. As of October 2013, Elizabeth Cunin became CEO after leaving Comptoir des Cotonniers and Princess Tam Tam.

On October 1, 2022 Camaïeu shut down.
