= Miss France 2020 =

90th Miss France competition, national beauty pageant edition

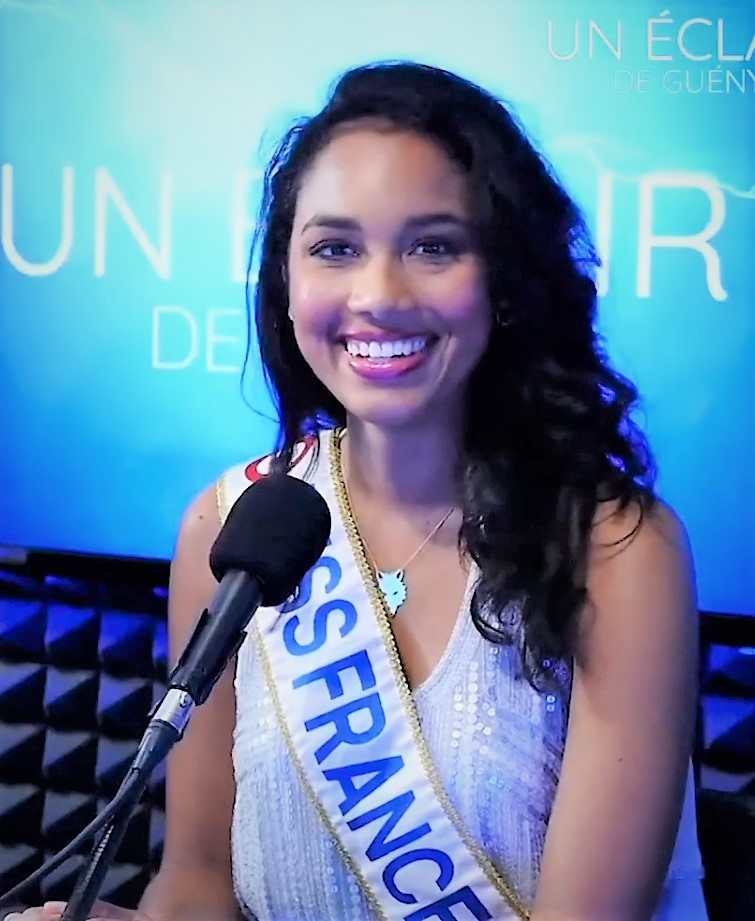
- Miss France 2020, Clémence Botino
- Date: 14 December 2019
- Presenters: Jean-Pierre Foucault; Sylvie Tellier; Vaimalama Chaves
- Entertainment: Robbie Williams; Vaimalama Chaves
- Venue: Le Dôme, Marseille, Provence-Alpes-Côte d'Azur
- Broadcaster: TF1
- Entrants: 30
- Placements: 15
- Winner: Clémence Botino; Guadeloupe
- Congeniality: Alison Salapic; Limousin
- Photogenic: Florentine Somers; Nord-Pas-de-Calais

Miss France 2020 was the 90th edition of the Miss France pageant, held on 14 December 2019 at the Le Dôme de Marseille in Marseille. Vaimalama Chaves of Tahiti crowned her successor Clémence Botino of Guadeloupe by the end of the event. She represented France at Miss Universe 2021, placing in the top 10. The competition was hosted by Jean-Pierre Foucault, Sylvie Tellier, and Miss France 2019 Vaimalama Chaves, with performances by Robbie Williams and Chaves. Footballer Amandine Henry served as the jury president.

== Background ==
On 11 April 2019, it was confirmed by the Miss France Organisation that the 2020 edition of the Miss France competition will be held on 14 December 2019 at Le Dôme in Marseille. While the overseas collectivities of Saint Martin-Saint Barthelemy and Saint Pierre and Miquelon typically alternate appearances at Miss France each year, Saint Pierre and Miquelon withdrew their participation due to a lack of local candidates; Saint Martin-Saint Barthélemy were thus invited in their place, allowing them to compete twice in a row. For this edition's trip abroad, the delegates traveled to Tahiti in French Polynesia, where they took part in a variety of events, until returning to Marseille to begin rehearsals.

== Results ==
Placement	Contestant
Miss France 2020	Guadeloupe – Clémence Botino
1st Runner-Up	Provence – Lou Ruat
2nd Runner-Up	Tahiti – Matahari Bousquet
3rd Runner-Up	Burgundy – Sophie Diry
4th Runner-Up	Côte d'Azur – Manelle Souahlia
Top 15 (Note: The Top 15 semifinalists are listed in the order that they placed according to the official results.)	Normandy – Marine Clautour (5th Runner-Up); Pays de la Loire – Yvana Cartaud (6th Runner-Up); Alsace – Laura Theodori; Picardy – Morgane Fradon; Poitou-Charentes – Andréa Galland; Saint Martin and Saint Barthélemy – Layla Berry; Réunion – Marie-Morgane Lebon; Île-de-France – Evelyne de Larichaudy; Aquitaine – Justine Delmas; Centre-Val de Loire – Jade Simon-Abadie

=== Special awards ===
Prize	Contestant
General Culture Award	Guadeloupe – Clémence Botino (17.5/20)
Elegance Award	Lorraine – Ilona Robelin
Best in Regional Costume	Pays de la Loire – Yvana Cartaud
Best in Swimsuit	Rhône-Alpes – Chloé Prost
Miss Photogenic	Nord-Pas-de-Calais – Florentine Somers
Miss Congeniality	Limousin – Alison Salapic
Miss Good Manners	Corse – Alixia Cauro
Catwalk Prize	Alsace – Laura Theodori

=== Scoring ===
==== Preliminaries ====
A jury composed of partners (internal and external) of the Miss France Committee selected fifteen delegates during an interview that took place on 11 December to advance to the semifinals. This was the first time the amount of semifinalists increased from twelve to fifteen.

==== Top fifteen ====
In the top fifteen, a 50/50 split vote between the official jury and voting public selected five delegates to advance to the top five. Each delegate was awarded an overall score of 1 to 15 from the jury and public, and the five delegates with the highest combined scores advanced to the top five. The girls with the sixth and seventh highest combined scores were afterwards designated as the fifth and sixth runners-up, respectively, despite not advancing in the competition.

Delegate	Public	Jury	Total
Provence	14	15	29
Burgundy	11	15	26
Guadeloupe	15	8	23
Côte d'Azur	5	15	20
Tahiti	13	7	20
Normandy	7	12	19
Pays de la Loire	12	7	19
Alsace	6	11	17
Picardy	10	7	17
Poitou-Charentes	9	7	16
Saint Martin and Saint Barthélemy	4	11	15
Réunion	8	7	15
Île-de-France	2	11	13
Aquitaine	3	7	10
Centre-Val de Loire	1	7	8

==== Top five ====
In the top five, public voting determined which delegate is declared Miss France.

Contestant	Results
Guadeloupe	31,95%
Provence	30,66%
Tahiti	15,87%
Burgundy	15,64%
Côte d'Azur	5,88%

== Pageant ==
=== Format ===
On 19 September 2019, it was announced that the theme for the 2020 competition would be "The Misses' World Tour," with competition rounds inspired by international destinations. Finals night featured a performance by British singer Robbie Williams, making this his second time performing at Miss France after doing so at the 2010 competition. The thirty contestants were initially divided into three groups of ten, with each group taking part in an initial presentation round. The three presentation rounds were themed after travel to the United Kingdom and Cool Britannia, Russia, and Spain and bullfighters, respectively. Afterwards, the thirty contestants competed in the one-piece swimsuit round, inspired by travel to the United States and the Wild West, followed by an evening gown round themed after travel to Japan. After this, the top fifteen were announced. After the selection of the top fifteen, the semifinalists competed in a two-piece swimsuit round themed after their overseas trip to French Polynesia, featuring a guest appearance from Miss France 2019 Vaimalama Chaves. After the two-piece swimsuit round, the top five were announced. The top five then competed in a fashion presentation round, themed after travel to Africa.

=== Judges ===
- Amandine Henry (President of the Jury) – footballer
- Laëtitia Milot – actress
- Christophe Michalak – pastry chef, author, and television host
- Slimane Nebchi – singer
- Vitaa – singer
- Mareva Galanter – singer, actress, and Miss France 1999 from Tahiti
- Denis Brogniart – television host and journalist

== Contestants ==
The 30 delegates have been selected.

Region	Contestant	Age (Note: Ages at the time of the pageant)	Height	Hometown	Placement
Alsace	Laura Theodori	23	1.72 m (5 ft 7 1/2 in)	Strasbourg	Top 15
Aquitaine	Justine Delmas	21	1.78 m (5 ft 10 in)	Saint-Sauveur	Top 15
Auvergne	Meïssa Ameur	21	1.86 m (6 ft 1 in)	Clermont-Ferrand	
Brittany	Romane Edern	24	1.75 m (5 ft 9 in)	Cléder	
Burgundy	Sophie Diry	21	1.77 m (5 ft 9 1/2 in)	Saint-Agnan	3rd Runner Up
Centre-Val de Loire	Jade Simon-Abadie	22	1.73 m (5 ft 8 in)	Neuillé-le-Lierre	Top 15
Champagne-Ardenne	Lucille Moine	18	1.73 m (5 ft 8 in)	Charleville-Mézières	
Corsica	Alixia Cauro	20	1.77 m (5 ft 9 1/2 in)	Giglio	
(Nice) Côte d'Azur	Manelle Souahlia	19	1.71 m (5 ft 7 1/2 in)	Nice	4th Runner Up
Franche-Comté	Solène Bernardin	23	1.77 m (5 ft 9 1/2 in)	Granges-la-Ville	
French Guiana	Dariana Abé	21	1.74 m (5 ft 8 1/2 in)	Apatou	
Guadeloupe	Clémence Botino	22	1.75 m (5 ft 9 in)	Le Gosier	Miss France 2020
Île-de-France	Evelyne de Larichaudy	23	1.73 m (5 ft 8 in)	Montrouge	Top 15
Languedoc-Roussillon	Lucie Caussanel	18	1.80 m (5 ft 11 in)	Montblanc	
Limousin	Alison Salapic	22	1.72 m (5 ft 7 1/2 in)	Saint-Vaury	
Lorraine	Ilona Robelin	18	1.80 m (5 ft 11 in)	Montenoy	
Martinique	Ambre Bozza	21	1.77 m (5 ft 9 1/2 in)	Sainte-Luce	
Mayotte	Eva Labourdère	20	1.75 m (5 ft 9 in)	Mtsapere	
Midi-Pyrénées	Andréa Magalhães	21	1.73 m (5 ft 8 in)	Viozan	
New Caledonia	Anaïs Toven	18	1.70 m (5 ft 7 in)	Nouméa	
Nord-Pas-de-Calais	Florentine Somers	19	1.79 m (5 ft 10 1/2 in)	Loon-Plage	
Normandy	Marine Clautour	21	1.72 m (5 ft 7 1/2 in)	Amfreville-la-Mi-Voie	Top 15
Pays de la Loire	Yvana Cartaud	18	1.74 m (5 ft 8 1/2 in)	Beaufou	Top 15
Picardy	Morgane Fradon	20	1.75 m (5 ft 9 in)	Cires-lès-Mello	Top 15
Poitou-Charentes	Andréa Galland	20	1.72 m (5 ft 7 1/2 in)	Niort	Top 15
Provence	Lou Ruat	19	1.70 m (5 ft 7 in)	Aix-en-Provence	1st Runner Up
Réunion	Marie-Morgane Lebon	20	1.77 m (5 ft 9 1/2 in)	Saint-Joseph	Top 15
Rhône-Alpes	Chloé Prost	20	1.78 m (5 ft 10 in)	Légny	
Saint Martin and Saint Barthélemy	Layla Berry	20	1.74 m (5 ft 8 1/2 in)	Grande Saline	Top 15
Tahiti	Matahari Bousquet	23	1.77 m (5 ft 9 1/2 in)	Moorea-Maiao	2nd Runner Up
