= Brevet de technicien supérieur =

National Diploma of higher education in France

The Brevet de technicien supérieur (BTS) senior technologist’s certificate (in English: "Advanced Technician Certificate") is a national diploma of higher education in France, established in 1959.

The technician certificate is usually earned in two years, after graduating with a "Bac" (baccalauréat) in a section of senior technician (STS) or a general section such as Science, Economics depending on the program. The training curriculum includes periods of internship.

The BTS is a level 5 diploma in the French diploma system (equivalent to level 5 ISCED in England, Wales and Northern Ireland). Graduation is by final exam scores which includes an oral presentation of a written internship report.

== Introduction ==
The BTS certificate is a quick way to access a professional qualification, and is intended for entry into the workforce.

Students seeking to earn the Brevet de Technicien Supérieur (BTS) can choose from several approaches:

- through formal education in a public or private school for a period of two years after earning a Bac
- alternating periods of training at a training center and employment/internship in the field
- continuing education with the possibility to benefit from the validation of acquired experience to all or part of the events associated with the degree examination. This path requires having 3 years of professional experience level of the diploma;
- distance learning (correspondence) through a training organization as the national center for distance learning (CNED) ENACO, home school, Educatel, absformation, cnfdi, during brace, CERCA Group École supérieure d'agricultures d'Angers ..., Simply register to the rectory (individually or through the school) during the second year for the exam. Training centers for distance stand in general by the absence of numerus clausus and freedom of organization learning. Distance learning courses are open to students, employees, applicants for employment regardless of age. Training can be supported under funding of continuing vocational training. It is also possible for some training to obtain exemptions from testing as academic achievement (for individuals already holding a BTS, DUT, DEUG, DEUST, L2 or preparatory classes for the grandes écoles), select materials including through a combination with the validation of acquired experience.

The French government has developed a web−portal at ONISEP (a French work and study information institute), for accessing the list of schools providing training.

The scale of BTS institutions is similar to a high school: in the numerous places of educational offerings, the number of students per class, and the average study load. The schools offering a BTS can be private or public institutions. Each school chooses the specific certificate programs it offers.

There are over a hundred specialty commercial, industrial, or agricultural (e.g. Higher technician certificate agriculture (BTSA) BTS certificate programs. Some specialty study options are offered in the BTS 's second year (e.g. hotels, business computing). Students have access to BTS programs at regional centers of universities and schools (CROUS). Scholarships can include housing and meals.

== Opportunities ==
The BTS certificate provides quick achievement of professional qualifications for entry into the workforce.

=== Further studies ===
However, a continuation of study can be considered. The LMD reform encourages holders of BTS, after a year equal to L2, to continue their studies until acquiring a professional license or DCG (L3). Obtaining higher technician certificate carries the acquisition of 120 European credits (ECTS). In fall 2007, 33.5% of those earning a BTS continued their studies.

After a BTS is earned, some students make a third year specialization which is equivalent to a licence (university degree). There has been an expansion of workforce openings since 1999 for the training-type professional licence.

Some BTS graduates can go on to engineering colleges, business schools, university preparatory classes for a Diploma in Accounting and Management (DCG), and the Professionalized Institute (IUP).

== Distance learning (by correspondence) ==
Distance learning allows students to prepare for BTS remotely, to pass the exam. This training is suitable especially in the context of continuing professional education, because people who work can study in the evening or on weekends. Students must submit assignments that teachers refer back as noted and corrected. They pass the examination candidates with free classics students.

Distance education requires personal work and autonomy on the part of the student, but some organizations offer group sessions to review and preparations for oral interviews.

Institutions offering BTS certificate distance learning include:

- CNED (Centre national d'enseignement à distance), ENACO, CNFDI, and Group École Supérieure d'Agriculture d'Angers.

== Students ==
Candidate students are usually first considered from all the test results of the same examination session. In case of failure, they have the ability to keep grades of the examination units greater than or equal to 10 at a later session and therefore the board did review units where they had not obtained the pass score.

Institutions select applicants according to the test standings and academic records of the candidates. Grades from the last two years of High School training records are taken into account, as well as assessments by teachers. The student applicant to the BTS must have at least a Bac. For some sections, a CV (curriculum vitae) and/or a cover letter are required, although legally selection can be done from the applicant's file alone.

The selection interviews are of a legally questionable nature. The rejection of an application after an interview may be appealed to the Administrative Court. The use of these interviews is often trying to determine whether educational perspective and technical qualifications (files are sometimes insufficient to properly assess the candidate's ability) are sufficient for the integrating training BTS. An appeal to the administrative court does not guarantee success in selection.

The BTS is particularly aimed at students who study technological or professional majors.

== Regulatory context ==
All diplomas are organized around the same general rules defined by government decree.

The content of the training for each specialty is developed by an advisory committee that meets Joint employers, employees and government. First defined professional activities which will engage the technician. From this, the certification standard diploma is established to define the capabilities, skills and knowledge associated. Evaluation situations are offered through an examination regulations. Other elements are also defined as the weekly schedule training school status. This information is included in a document called "repository" including downloadable on the site of the National Center for Educational Documentation.

Depending on the Bac a student has passed and the BTS program, it is the equivalence to an American Bachelor's Degree

== See also ==
- Education in France
- Higher education in France
