= Miss France 2021 =

91st Miss France competition, national beauty pageant edition

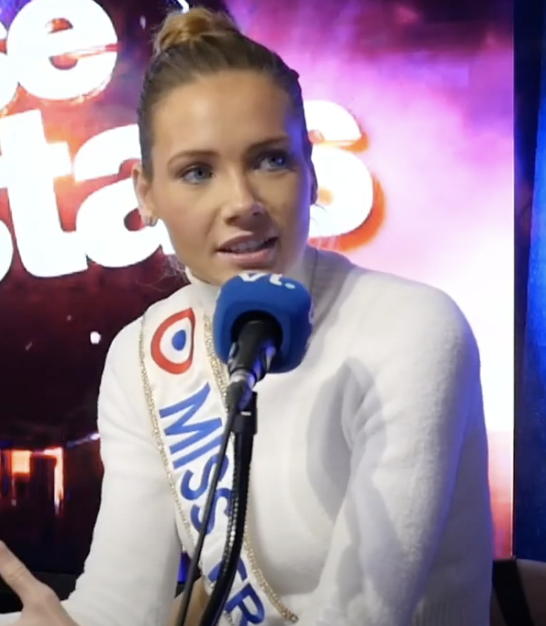
- Miss France 2021, Amandine Petit
- Date: 19 December 2020
- Presenters: Jean-Pierre Foucault; Sylvie Tellier
- Venue: Puy du Fou, Les Epesses, Pays de la Loire
- Broadcaster: TF1
- Entrants: 29
- Placements: 15
- Withdrawals: Saint Martin and Saint Barthélemy; Tahiti
- Returns: Wallis and Futuna
- Winner: Amandine Petit; Normandy
- Congeniality: Diane Febvay; Lorraine
- Photogenic: Laura Cornillot; Nord-Pas-de-Calais

Miss France 2021 was the 91st edition of the Miss France pageant. The competition was held on 19 December 2020 at Puy du Fou in Les Epesses, Pays de la Loire. Clémence Botino of Guadeloupe crowned Amandine Petit of Normandy as her successor at the end of the event. Petit represented France at Miss Universe 2020.

Despite only being the 91st edition, the 2021 edition was celebrated as the centenary of Miss France, as the competition was first held in 1920, before being paused from 1922 to 1926 and 1941–46, the latter due to World War II.

This was the second time that Miss France was held at Puy du Fou and in the Pays de la Loire region after Miss France 2009.

== Background ==
=== Location ===
On 2 September 2020, it was confirmed by the Miss France Committee that Miss France 2021 would be held on 12 December 2020 at Puy du Fou in Les Epesses, Pays de la Loire. This would be the second time the competition has been held at Puy du Fou, following Miss France 2009. The competition was later postponed to 19 December after Emmanuel Macron announced a nationwide lockdown in France for the month of November due to the COVID-19 pandemic.

While the Miss France contestants typically embark on an overseas trip during preparation for the competition, their planned trip to Guadeloupe was canceled due to the COVID-19 pandemic, and they instead traveled to Versailles, Yvelines to visit the Palace of Versailles.

=== Selection of contestants ===
Due to the COVID-19 pandemic, the region of Tahiti withdrew from the competition after deciding to cancel their regional pageant for Miss France 2021. The 2021 edition saw the return of Wallis and Futuna to Miss France; the region had only competed four times in history, and not since 2005.

On 14 October, it was confirmed that Saint Martin and Saint Barthélemy would not compete after their selected candidate Naïma Dessout was disqualified by the Miss France Committee for having previously participated in a nude photoshoot. Additionally, no representative was selected to replace Dessout at Miss France. This came after Anastasia Salvi, the original winner of Miss Franche-Comté, resigned amidst a nude photo scandal, and Anaëlle Guimbi, a competitor in Miss Guadeloupe, was disqualified ahead of the regional pageant for nude photos taken in support of a breast cancer awareness campaign.

== Results ==
Placement	Contestant
Miss France 2021	Normandy – Amandine Petit
1st Runner-Up	Provence – April Benayoum
2nd Runner-Up	Côte d'Azur – Lara Gautier
3rd Runner-Up	Alsace – Aurélie Roux
4th Runner-Up	Burgundy – Lou-Anne Lorphelin
Top 15 (Note: The Top 15 semifinalists are listed in the order that they placed according to the official results.)	Réunion – Lyna Boyer (5th Runner-Up); Île-de-France – Lara Lourenço (6th Runner-Up); Guadeloupe – Kenza Andreze-Louison; Pays de la Loire – Julie Tagliavacca; Poitou-Charentes – Justine Dubois; Aquitaine – Leïla Veslard; Corsica – Noémie Leca; Mayotte – Anlia Charifa; Rhône-Alpes – Anaïs Roux; Limousin – Léa Graniou

=== Special awards ===
Prize	Contestant
General Culture Award	Burgundy – Lou-Anne Lorphelin (17.5/20) (Note: The General Culture Award is given to the contestant with the highest score on the general culture exam, which tests contestants' grasp of topics such as history, politics, current events, and pop culture. Miss Burgundy received the highest score of 17.5 and was thus given the award.)
Elegance Award	Languedoc-Roussillon – Illana Barry
Best in Regional Costume	Limousin – Léa Graniou
Best in Swimsuit	Île-de-France – Lara Lourenço
Miss Photogenic	Nord-Pas-de-Calais – Laura Cornillot
Miss Congeniality	Lorraine – Diane Febvay
Miss Good Manners	Picardy – Tara de Mets
Catwalk Prize	Guadeloupe – Kenza Andreze-Louison

=== Scoring ===
==== Preliminaries ====
A jury composed of partners (internal and external) of the Miss France Committee selected fifteen delegates during an interview that took place on 16 December to advance to the semifinals.

==== Top 15 ====
In the top fifteen, a 50/50 split vote between the official jury and voting public selected five delegates to advance to the top five. Each delegate was awarded an overall score of 1 to 15 from the jury and public, and the five delegates with the highest combined scores advanced to the top five. The delegates with the sixth and seventh highest combined scores were afterwards designated as the fifth and sixth runners-up, respectively, despite not advancing in the competition. In the case of a tie, the jury vote prevailed.

Contestant	Public	Jury	Total
Burgundy	12	15	27
Normandy	14	12	26
Alsace	15	11	26
(Nice) Côte d'Azur	10	14	24
Provence	11	13	24
Réunion	13	7	20
Île-de-France	9	9	18
Guadeloupe	8	9	17
Pays de la Loire	7	7	14
Poitou-Charentes	6	7	13
Aquitaine	2	10	12
Corsica	5	7	12
Mayotte	4	3	7
Rhône-Alpes	3	3	6
Limousin	1	3	4

==== Top five ====
In the top five, a 50/50 split vote between the official jury and voting public determined which contestant was declared Miss France. This was the first time the jury could vote in the top five since Miss France 2010. Each contestant was ranked from first to fifth by the jury and public, and the two scores were combined to create a total score. In the case of a tie, the public vote prevailed. If this rule change had not occurred, Normandy still would have won, while Alsace would have been first runner-up, followed by Provence, Burgundy, and then Côte d'Azur.

#	Candidate	Public	Jury	Total
1	Normandy	5	2	7
2	Provence	3	4	7
3	(Nice) Côte d'Azur	1	5	6
4	Alsace	4	1	5
5	Burgundy	2	3	5

== Pageant ==
=== Format ===
While the edition was not given a titled theme like in previous years, on 4 December 2020, it was announced that the theme for the 2021 competition would revolve around French influence in the world, with competition rounds inspired by aspects of French culture and history that have received international popularity and recognition. On 15 December, it was announced that instead of the winner being decided by public voting as it had been since Miss France 2010, there would instead be a rule change where the winner would be decided by a 50/50 split of jury voting and public voting, much like how the top five has been chosen in past editions.

The 29 contestants were initially separated into three groups, two consisting of ten contestants and one of nine, with each group taking part in an initial presentation round. The three presentation rounds were themed after the Palace of Versailles, French cuisine, and the Moulin Rouge, respectively. Afterwards, the 29 contestants presented their regional costumes, created by local designers from their home regions. The 29 contestants subsequently participated in the one-piece swimsuit round, inspired by French cinema.

After the one-piece swimsuit round, the top fifteen were announced. The top fifteen then competed in the two-piece swimsuit round, inspired by Bastille Day and French landmarks such as the Eiffel Tower and Arc de Triomphe. After the two-piece swimsuit round, the top five were announced. The top five then presented their evening gowns, in a round inspired by fairy tales, and then participated in the final question round. After the final question round, the top five participated in their final presentation round, inspired by French art, before the final results were revealed.

=== Judges ===
To celebrate the centenary of Miss France, the Miss France Committee announced that the jury would consist of only former Miss France titleholders.

- Iris Mittenaere (President of the Jury) – Miss France 2016 and Miss Universe 2016 from Nord-Pas-de-Calais
- Patricia Barzyk – Miss France 1980 from Franche-Comté
- Flora Coquerel – Miss France 2014 from Centre-Val de Loire
- Muguette Fabris – Miss France 1963 from Île-de-France
- Mareva Georges – Miss France 1991 from Tahiti
- Élodie Gossuin – Miss France 2001 and Miss Europe 2001 from Picardy
- Linda Hardy – Miss France 1992 from Pays de la Loire
- Nathalie Marquay – Miss France 1987 from Alsace
- Sonia Rolland – Miss France 2000 from Burgundy

== Contestants ==
The 29 delegates were:

Region	Contestant	Age (Note: Ages at the time of the pageant)	Height	Hometown	Placement	Notes
Alsace	Aurélie Roux	24	1.72 m (5 ft 7 1/2 in)	Spechbach-le-Bas	3rd Runner-Up	
Aquitaine	Leïla Veslard	18	1.74 m (5 ft 8 1/2 in)	Saint-Mesmin	Top 15	
Auvergne	Géromine Prique	21	1.71 m (5 ft 7 1/2 in)	Clermont-Ferrand		
Burgundy	Lou-Anne Lorphelin	23	1.71 m (5 ft 7 1/2 in)	Charnay-lès-Mâcon	4th Runner-Up	Sister of Marine Lorphelin, Miss France 2013
Brittany	Julie Foricher	23	1.77 m (5 ft 9 1/2 in)	Relecq-Kerhuon		
Centre-Val de Loire	Cloé Delavalle	23	1.72 m (5 ft 7 1/2 in)	Chartres		
Champagne-Ardenne	Gwenegann Saillard	21	1.70 m (5 ft 7 in)	Sainte-Savine		
Corsica	Noémie Leca	19	1.75 m (5 ft 9 in)	Cargèse	Top 15	
(Nice) Côte d'Azur	Lara Gautier	22	1.73 m (5 ft 8 in)	Contes	2nd Runner-Up	
Franche-Comté	Coralie Gandelin	23	1.72 m (5 ft 7 1/2 in)	La Chailleuse		Originally the first runner-up, but assumed the title after winner Anastasia Salvi resigned two days after her crowning.
French Guiana	Héléneschka Horth	23	1.74 m (5 ft 8 1/2 in)	Awala-Yalimapo		
Guadeloupe	Kenza Andreze-Louison	20	1.76 m (5 ft 9 1/2 in)	Baie-Mahault	Top 15	
Île-de-France	Lara Lourenço	19	1.71 m (5 ft 7 1/2 in)	Saint-Maur-des-Fossés	Top 15	
Languedoc-Roussillon	Illana Barry	19	1.76 m (5 ft 9 1/2 in)	Aigues-Mortes		
Limousin	Léa Graniou	20	1.72 m (5 ft 7 1/2 in)	Limoges	Top 15	
Lorraine	Diane Febvay	19	1.78 m (5 ft 10 in)	Piblange		
Martinique	Séphorah Azur	23	1.78 m (5 ft 10 in)	Schœlcher		
Mayotte	Anlia Charifa	23	1.77 m (5 ft 9 1/2 in)	Dzaoudzi	Top 15	
Midi-Pyrénées	Emma Arrebot-Natou	19	1.78 m (5 ft 10 in)	Tournefeuille		
New Caledonia	Louisa Salvan	19	1.74 m (5 ft 8 1/2 in)	Mont-Dore		
Nord-Pas-de-Calais	Laura Cornillot	24	1.78 m (5 ft 10 in)	Ennevelin		
Normandy	Amandine Petit	23	1.75 m (5 ft 9 in)	Bourguébus	Miss France 2021	
Pays de la Loire	Julie Tagliavacca	24	1.73 m (5 ft 8 in)	Maulévrier	Top 15	
Picardy	Tara de Mets	21	1.79 m (5 ft 10 1/2 in)	Clermont		
Poitou-Charentes	Justine Dubois	24	1.74 m (5 ft 8 1/2 in)	Angoulême	Top 15	
Provence	April Benayoum	21	1.76 m (5 ft 9 1/2 in)	Éguilles	1st Runner-Up	
Réunion	Lyna Boyer	21	1.73 m (5 ft 8 in)	La Possession	Top 15	
Rhône-Alpes	Anaïs Roux	23	1.74 m (5 ft 8 1/2 in)	Lyon	Top 15	
Wallis and Futuna	Mylène Halemai	19	1.73 m (5 ft 8 in)	Fineveke		
