= Miss France 2019 =

89th Miss France competition, beauty pageant edition

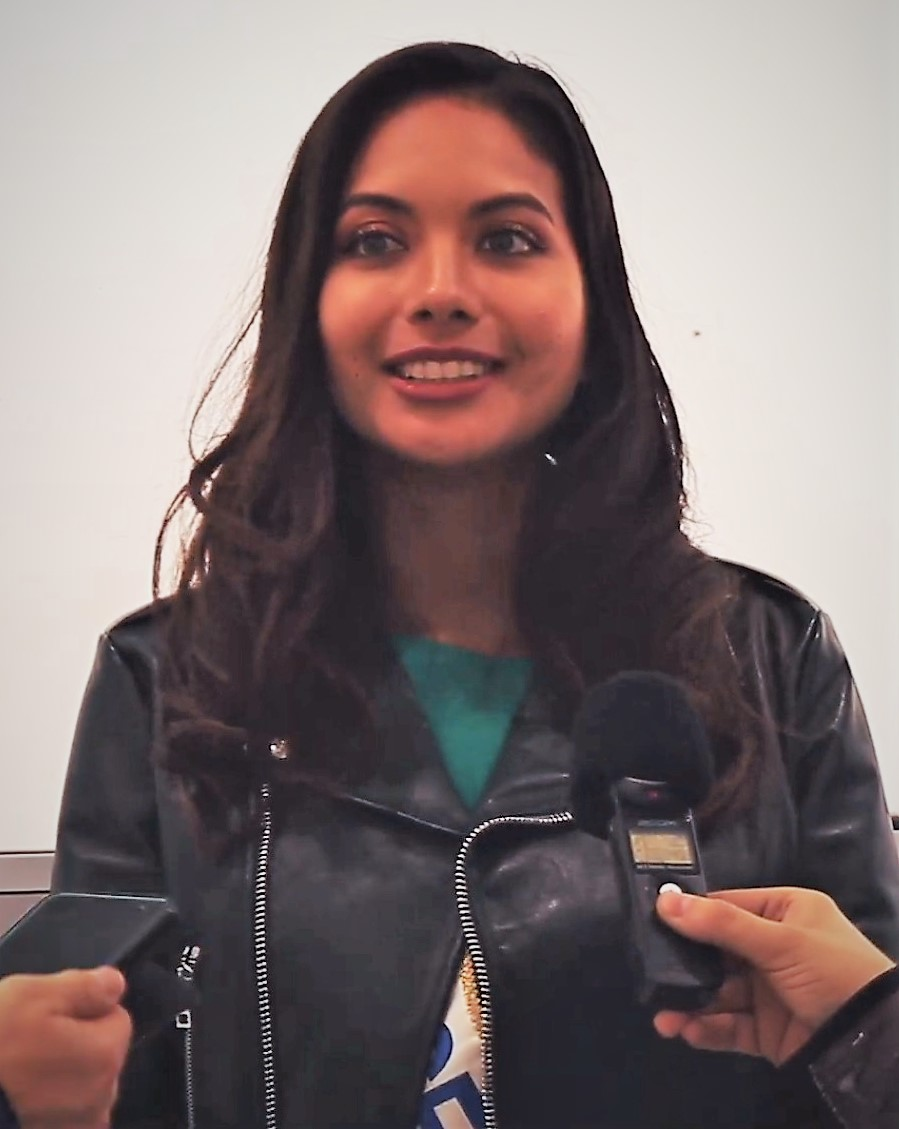
- Miss France 2019 Vaimalama Chaves
- Date: 15 December 2018
- Presenters: Jean-Pierre Foucault; Sylvie Tellier; Maëva Coucke
- Venue: Zénith de Lille, Lille, Hauts-de-France
- Broadcaster: TF1
- Entrants: 30
- Placements: 12
- Withdrawals: Saint Pierre and Miquelon
- Returns: Saint Martin and Saint Barthélemy
- Winner: Vaimalama Chaves; Tahiti
- Congeniality: Aude Destour; Limousin
- Photogenic: Lola Brengues; Languedoc-Roussillon

Miss France 2019 was the 89th edition of the Miss France pageant, held on 15 December 2018 at the Zénith de Lille in Lille. The competition was hosted by Jean-Pierre Foucault, Sylvie Tellier, and Miss France 2018 Maëva Coucke, while singer and actress Line Renaud served as president of the jury.

Maëva Coucke of Nord-Pas-de-Calais crowned her successor Vaimalama Chaves of Tahiti at the end of the event.

== Background ==
On 23 April 2018, it was announced by the Miss France Organisation that Miss France 2019 would take place at Zénith de Lille in Lille, Nord-Pas-de-Calais. The thirty contestants had an international trip to Mauritius, where they were tested in a variety of competitions, before rehearsals for the pageant began in Lille. On 17 November, Line Renaud was confirmed as the president of the jury for the competition, while it was announced that for the first time the jury will consist of solely women.

== Results ==
Placement	Contestant
Miss France 2019	Tahiti – Vaimalama Chaves
1st Runner-Up	Guadeloupe – Ophély Mézino
2nd Runner-Up	Franche-Comté – Lauralyne Demesmay
3rd Runner-Up	Réunion – Morgane Soucramanien
4th Runner-Up	Limousin – Aude Destour
Top 12	Provence – Wynona Gueraini (5th Runner-Up); Île-de-France – Alice Quérette (6th Runner-Up); Aquitaine – Carla Bonesso; Côte d'Azur – Caroline Perengo; Languedoc-Roussillon – Lola Brengues; Lorraine – Emma Virtz; Nord-Pas-de-Calais – Annabelle Varane

=== Special awards ===
Prize	Contestant
General Culture Award	Centre-Val de Loire – Laurie Derouard (18.5/20)
Elegance Award	Normandy – Anaëlle Chrétien
Best in Regional Costume	Midi-Pyrénées – Axelle Breil (designer: Anaïs Ricard)
Best in Swimsuit	New Caledonia – Amandine Chabrie
Miss Photogenic	Languedoc-Roussillon – Lola Brengues
Miss Congeniality	Limousin – Aude Destour

=== Scoring ===
==== Preliminaries ====
A jury composed of partners (internal and external) of the Miss France Committee selected twelve delegates during an interview that took place on 12 December to advance to the semifinals.

==== Top twelve ====
In the top twelve, a 50/50 split vote between the official jury and voting public selected five delegates to advance to the top five. Each delegate was awarded an overall score of 1 to 12 from the jury and public, and the five delegates with the highest combined scores advanced to the top five. The girls with the sixth and seventh highest combined scores were afterwards designated as the fifth and sixth runners-up, respectively, despite not advancing in the competition.

Delegate	Public	Jury	Total
Tahiti	12	12	24
Guadeloupe	11	12	23
Franche-Comté	10	7	17
Limousin	3	12	15
Réunion	8	7	15
Provence	6	8	14
Île-de-France	4	9	13
Languedoc-Roussillon	9	4	13
Nord-Pas-de-Calais	7	4	11
Lorraine	5	5	10
Aquitaine	2	4	6
Côte d'Azur	1	4	5

==== Top five ====
In the top five, public voting determined which delegate is declared Miss France.

Contestant	Results
Tahiti	44%
Guadeloupe	20%
Franche-Comté	19%
Réunion	10%
Limousin	4%

== Pageant ==
=== Format ===
The theme for this year's competition was "The Misses Put on a Show", with competition rounds inspired by various popular forms of entertainment. Like in previous years, the thirty contestants were first divided into three groups of ten, with each group taking part in an initial presentation round. The three presentation rounds were themed after cabaret, Bollywood, and the circus, respectively. Afterwards, the thirty contestants competed in the one-piece swimsuit round, inspired by Old Hollywood, which featured guest appearances from former Miss France winners Camille Cerf, Flora Coquerel, and 2019 competition judge Laury Thilleman. Following the one-piece swimsuit round, the contestants changed into ballgowns and the top twelve was announced. After the announcement of the top twelve, the twelve semi-finalists competed in the second swimsuit round, inspired by superheroes and featuring a guest appearance from current Miss France Maëva Coucke. Following the swimsuit competition, the top five was announced. The top five then participated in the final fashion show round, inspired by showgirls. Afterwards, they participated in the final question round. The five finalists then completed their final walks, before Miss France 2019 and her four runners-up were crowned by Coucke and Line Renaud, president of the jury.

=== Judges ===
For the first time ever, the jury consisted of solely women.

- Line Renaud (President of the Jury) – singer and actress
- Maud Baecker – actress and comedian
- Caroline Garcia – tennis player
- Jenifer – singer and actress
- Alice Renavand – ballet dancer
- Claudia Tagbo – comedian
- Laury Thilleman – Miss France 2011 from Brittany

== Contestants ==
Region	Contestant	Age (Note: Ages at the time of the pageant)	Height	Hometown	Placement	Notes
Alsace	Léa Reboul	22	1.74 m (5 ft 8 1/2 in)	Lingolsheim		
Aquitaine	Carla Bonesso	20	1.76 m (5 ft 9 1/2 in)	Dax	Top 12	
Auvergne	Romane Eichstadt	19	1.81 m (5 ft 11 1/2 in)	Vichy		
Brittany	Émilie Bachellereau	22	1.81 m (5 ft 11 1/2 in)	Larmor-Plage		
Burgundy	Coline Touret	19	1.73 m (5 ft 8 in)	Auxerre		
Centre-Val de Loire	Laurie Derouard	23	1.76 m (5 ft 9 1/2 in)	Champhol		
Champagne-Ardenne	Paméla Texier	22	1.71 m (5 ft 7 1/2 in)	Sillery		
Corsica	Manon Jean-Mistral	18	1.74 m (5 ft 8 1/2 in)	Porto-Vecchio		
(Nice) Côte d'Azur	Caroline Perengo	22	1.71 m (5 ft 7 1/2 in)	Saint-Tropez	Top 12	
Franche-Comté	Lauralyne Demesmay	18	1.80 m (5 ft 11 in)	Devecey	2nd Runner-Up	
Guadeloupe	Ophély Mézino	19	1.72 m (5 ft 7 1/2 in)	Morne-à-l'Eau	1st Runner-Up	
Guiana	Laureline Decocq	18	1.76 m (5 ft 9 1/2 in)	Remire-Montjoly		
Île-de-France	Alice Quérette	24	1.76 m (5 ft 9 1/2 in)	Boulogne-Billancourt	Top 12	
Languedoc-Roussillon	Lola Brengues	19	1.77 m (5 ft 9 1/2 in)	Congénies	Top 12	
Limousin	Aude Destour	23	1.76 m (5 ft 9 1/2 in)	Limoges	4th Runner-Up	
Lorraine	Emma Virtz	21	1.72 m (5 ft 7 1/2 in)	Villers-lès-Nancy	Top 12	
Martinique	Olivia Luscap	18	1.77 m (5 ft 9 1/2 in)	Le Robert		
Mayotte	Ousna Attoumani	20	1.76 m (5 ft 9 1/2 in)	Chiconi		
Midi-Pyrénées	Axelle Breil	20	1.80 m (5 ft 11 in)	Toulouse		
New Caledonia	Amandine Chabrier	19	1.71 m (5 ft 7 1/2 in)	Le Mont-Dore		
Nord-Pas-de-Calais	Annabelle Varane	19	1.81 m (5 ft 11 1/2 in)	Hellemmes	Top 12	Sister of footballer Raphaël Varane
Normandy	Anaëlle Chrétien	22	1.81 m (5 ft 11 1/2 in)	Saint-Pair-sur-Mer		
Pays de la Loire	Diane Le Roux	22	1.82 m (5 ft 11 1/2 in)	Orvault		
Picardy	Assia Kerim	22	1.71 m (5 ft 7 1/2 in)	Amiens		
Poitou-Charentes	Marion Sokolik	23	1.74 m (5 ft 8 1/2 in)	Cognac		
Provence	Wynona Gueraini	19	1.74 m (5 ft 8 1/2 in)	Marignane	Top 12	Gueraini was originally the second runner-up, but became Miss Provence after winner Aurélie Pons resigned and first runner-up Gabrielle Ghio declined the offer to take over the title.
Réunion	Morgane Soucramanien	18	1.74 m (5 ft 8 1/2 in)	Sainte-Marie	3rd Runner-Up	
Rhône-Alpes	Pauline Ianiro	19	1.78 m (5 ft 10 in)	Saint-Denis-lès-Bourg		
Saint Martin and Saint Barthélemy	Allisson Georges	18	1.70 m (5 ft 7 in)	Marigot		
Tahiti	Vaimalama Chaves	24	1.78 m (5 ft 10 in)	Mahina	Miss France 2019	
