= Miss Universe Thailand 2021 =

22nd Miss Universe Thailand pageant

- Official pageant logo
- Date: 24 October 2021
- Presenters: Piyawat Kempetch; Kasamawat Khetwit; Praewwanich Ruangthong; Punika Kulsoontornrut
- Entertainment: Milli
- Theme: Power of Passion
- Venue: NICE, Nong Nooch Tropical Garden, Pattaya, Thailand
- Broadcaster: PPTV; TrueID
- Owner: TPN Global Company Limited
- Entrants: 30
- Placements: 15
- Winner: Anchilee Scott-Kemmis

Miss Universe Thailand 2021 was the 22nd edition of Miss Universe Thailand. It was held on 24 October 2021 at the NICE of Nong Nooch Tropical Garden in Pattaya, Thailand. The previous winner, Amanda Obdam, crowned Anchilee Scott-Kemmis as her successor at the end of the event.

Thirty contestants participated in this year's competition. It was hosted by Piyawat Kempetch for the third consecutive year. Beauty camp was held at Khao Yai National Park in Pak Chong, Nakhon Ratchasima. It was the first time the pageant aired as a reality show. The final competition was broadcast by PPTV HD and TrueID.

This edition marked the first year under the management of Punika Kulsoontornrut, who was also the runway coach. Kulsoontornrut was previously second runner-up at the previous edition.

== Background ==
=== Location and date ===
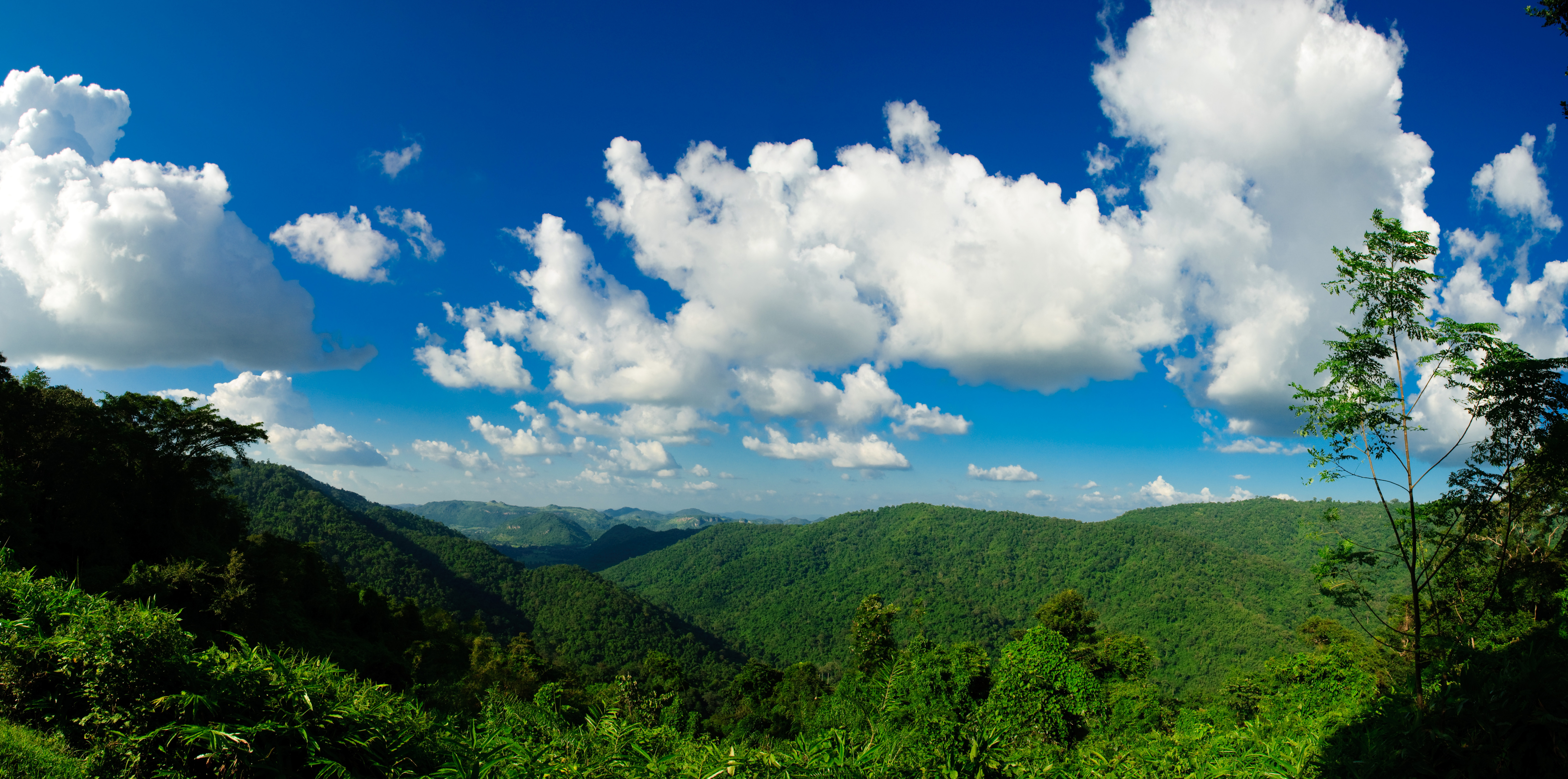
Khao Yai National Park venue for a beauty camp and swimsuit presentatio

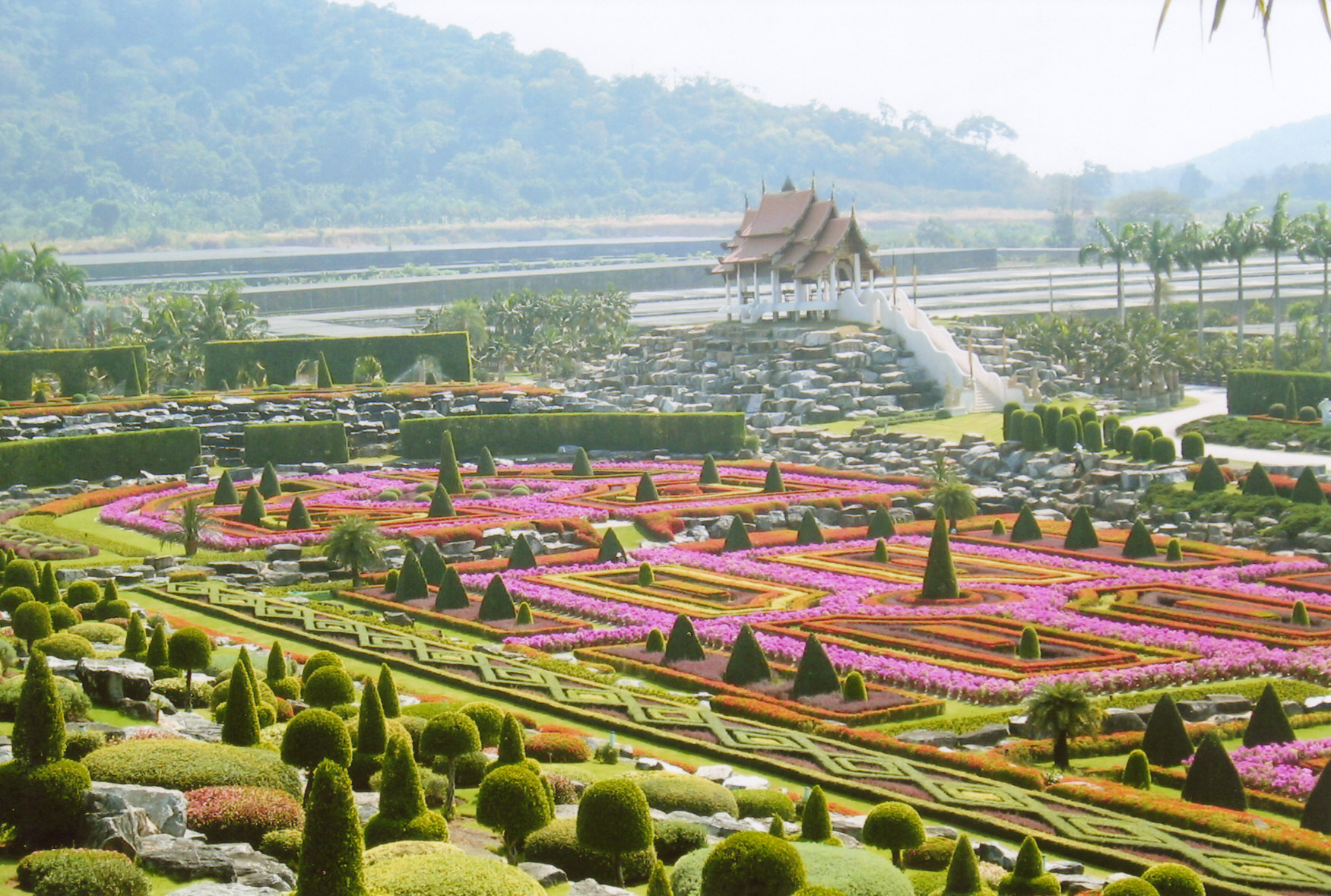
NICE, Nong Nooch Tropical Garden, the final venue for the pageant

On 6 September 2021, the organisers, TPN Global Co., Ltd. announced that the dates for preliminary and final competition would be 22 and 24 October, at the True Icon Hall of Iconsiam in Bangkok. With the Beauty camp held from 9 to 15 October, and the swimsuit presentation also on 19 October. Both events will be held at Khao Yai National Park in Pak Chong, Nakhon Ratchasima.

=== Selection of participants ===
On 6 September 2021, the organisers launched the participant selection process for the pageant. It began with the submission of applications with final date being 19 September 2021.

On 26 September 2021, the organisers announced the 63 candidates. The audition day and Top 30 announcement was held on 1 October 2021 and the eight candidates who received the Golden Tiara Award at the audition were automatically advanced to the Top 30.

Award	Contestants	Ref
Golden Tiara	08 – Sarinthorn Kathleen Branston; 09 – Surarak Kairsungnoen; 24 – Pimnara Vonzurmuehlen; 27 – Anchilee Scott-Kemmis; 18 – Mie Hirai; 07 – Pheeraya Phuangsombut; 10 – Nichnita Chatthirarat; 28 – Kanthica Champathong	

=== Team expert ===
On 6 September 2021, the organisers announced the pageant experts and coaches for the pageant.

- Rossukon Gonggate – Acting coach and human skills developer
- Punika Kulsoontornrut – Runway coach
- Thitipong Duangkong – Speech content
- Varistha Nakornthap – Speech content
- Vinij Boonchaisri – Head of make up by L'Oréal Paris
- Wachira Manowong – Choreographer
- Thitipan Raksasat – Director of MUT Ringside Reality

=== MUT Reality Live: Exclusive Content ===
Miss Universe Thailand 2021
- Official postcard of Miss Universe Thailand 2021
- Also known as: MUT Reality Live: Exclusive Content
- Genre: Competition
- Country of origin: Thailand
- Original language: Thai
- No. of episodes: 12

Production
- Executive producer: Thitipan Raksasat

Original release
- Network: TrueID (MUT Reality Live)

An eight-episode reality show entitled "MUT Reality Live: Exclusive Content" will release on MUT Reality Live Channel via TrueID, and could be viewed for a one-time fee. This list is the episode of MUT Reality Live: Exclusive Content.

Episode	Title	Original air date	Ref
1	Re-Act Who's Next MUT 2021	23 September 2021	
2	First Shot, Best Shot	2 October 2021	
3	Keyword Battle	5 October 2021	
4	หน้าผมขย่มเอง (My makeup and hair)	6 October 2021	
5	From farm to table	13 October 2021	
6	Signature Walk	15 October 2021	
7	ห้องดำ (Interview Room)	17 October 2021	
8	Dance Center	18 October 2021	
SP	ลองไฟไปจักรวาล (Rehearsal to the Universe)	23 October 2021	

==== Challenge winners ====
Challenge	Contestants	Ref
First Shot, Best Shot by Aotura	24 – Pimnara Vonzurmuehlen	
Keyword Battle by Disinfect & Shield	18 – Mie Hirai	
My Makeup And Hair by Aotura	26 – Maria Sangthonghirun	
From Farm To Table by Golden Mountain	07 – Pheeraya Phuangsombut; 08 – Sarinthorn Kathleen Branston; 09 – Surarak Kairsungnoen; 10 – Nichnita Chatthirarat; 11 – Thanatcha Faikhwan; 12 – Jitlada Lakavijit	
Signature Walk by Bota-P	22 – Kodchakorn Korntrakoon	
Dance Center by BSC Shoes	23 – Kasama Suetrong	

=== Prize ===
On 6 September 2021, the organisers announced the prize money, and that the winner would receive a brand-new crown called "Flame of Passion", a house, a Honda Civic, and cryptocurrency.

- ฿5,000 – To each contestants advanced to the Top 63 (63 contestants)
- ฿10,000 – To each contestants advanced to the Top 30 (30 contestants)
- ฿100,000 – 4th Runner-up
- ฿100,000 – 3rd Runner-up
- ฿300,000 – 2nd Runner-up
- ฿500,000 – 1st Runner-up
- ฿1,000,000 – Winner

=== New crown ===
On 6 September 2021, Fred Mouawad announced a brand-new Mouawad crown for the pageant, "Flame of Passion". The crown was unveiled on 22 October 2021 during the preliminary competition.

=== Sponsors ===
This list is the main sponsorship for Miss Universe Thailand 2021 pageant.

- True 5G
- PPTV HD
- Mouawad
- AssetWise
- Bota-P
- Aotura & MUT Select
- L'Oréal Paris
- BitKub
- Honda
- TikTok

== Results ==
=== Placements ===
Placement	Contestant
Miss Universe Thailand 2021	MUT27 – Anchilee Scott-Kemmis
1st Runner-Up	MUT02 – Tharina Botes §
2nd Runner-Up	MUT13 – Nanthiya Suwansaweang
3rd Runner-Up	MUT23 – Kasama Suetrong
4th Runner-Up	MUT24 – Pimnara Vonzurmuehlen
Top 10	MUT03 – Kanokporn Markpolsombat; MUT05 – Karima Sakuntan; MUT09 – Surarak Kairsungnoen; MUT20 – Wanida Dokkularb; MUT21 – Yhok Sirimart
Top 15	MUT01 – Kansuda Chanakeeree; MUT08 – Sarinthorn Kathleen Branston; MUT16 – Suttida Chaiyakam; MUT25 – Chatikarn Suwannakote; MUT26 – Maria Sangthonghirun

§ – Voted into the Top 10 by online fans

=== Special awards ===
Award	Contestant
Nang Ngam Rak Khao Yai by Queen of Bakery	03 – Kanokporn Markpolsombat
Best Dressed in Gala Dinner by Queen of Bakery	24 – Pimnara Vonzurmuehlen
Social Media Challenge by Hyatt Regency	24 – Pimnara Vonzurmuehlen
Miss More Powerful by Bota-P	24 – Pimnara Vonzurmuehlen
Empowering Woman by L'oreal Paris	28 – Kanthica Champathong
Miss Futre Thoght Leader by Bitkub	08 – Sarinthorn Kathleen Branston
Miss Congeniality by Aotura	26 – Maria Sangthonghirun
Miss Real Passion by Doctor Tony	02 – Tharina Botes
Miss Natural Beauty by Vega	27 – Anchilee Scott-Kemmis
Social Advocacy by Disinfect & Shield	08 – Sarinthorn Kathleen Branston
Miss People's Choice by Bota-P	02 – Tharina Botes
Spectacular Top Vote by True 5G	02 – Tharina Botes

=== Miss Real Passion ===
Award	Contestant
Winner	02 – Tharina Botes
Top 5	27 – Anchilee Scott-Kemmis; 13 – Nanthiya Suwansaweang; 29 – Maylynda Yindeekhet; 23 – Kasama Suetrong
Top 10	24 – Pimnara Vonzurmuehlen; 01 – Kansuda Chanakeeree; 21 – Yhok Sirimart; 15 – Sornswan Wanboon; 26 – Maria Sangthonghirun

=== Best in National Costume ===
Award	Contestant
Winner	Nang Kard - Woman of Steel
Top 6	Muay Thai Renaissance; Hanuman Thai Boxing; MUAY THAI AR; Hanuman Tha-Wai-Waen; Beauty stacked with strength

== Pageant ==
=== Format ===
The twenty semifinalists will be chosen from the initial pool of 30 contestants through a closed-door interview, a swimsuit presentation, and a preliminary competition, which featured contestants competing in swimsuit and evening gown. As was introduced in the 2020 competition, popular voting will determine a contestant advancing to the Top 10, so there are nine remaining spots for these semifinalists.

=== Preliminary competition ===
The preliminary competition will be held on 22 October 2021, at NICE of Nong Nooch Tropical Garden in Pattaya. It will feature contestants competing in swimsuit and evening gown. It was hosted by Piyawat Kempetch and Amanda Obdam.

=== Final competition ===
The final competition will be held on 24 October 2021, at NICE of Nong Nooch Tropical Garden in Pattaya.

=== Selection committee ===
Interview

- Amanda Obdam – Actress, model, and beauty pageant titleholder who was crowned Miss Universe Thailand 2020
- Chanya Wisetsiri – Head of brand & communication of Bitkub Capital Group Holdings
- Charamphon Wattanakasemnat – Marketing director of Bota-P World
- Maria Poonlertlarp – Actress, model, singer, and beauty pageant titleholder who was crowned Miss Universe Thailand 2017
- Narong Lertkitsiri – Managing director of TPN Global and National director of Miss Universe Thailand
- Panadda Wongphudee️️ – Actress, model, host, singer, DJ and beauty pageant titleholder who was crowned Miss Thailand 2000
- Panchana Wattanasatian – President of Khao Yai Tourism Association and founder of "Food For Fighter" project
- Pongrapee Buranasompob – Expert in human potential development
- Piyaporn Sankosik – Managing director of TPN Global and National director of Miss Universe Thailand
- Risa Honghiran – Professional certified coach and beauty pageant titleholder who placed 1st Runner-up at Miss Thailand World 1988
- Rossukon Gonggate – Expert in communication skills and personality
- Taneth Laksanavilas – Expert in beauty pageant and co-founder of T-Pageant
- Thitipong Duangkong – Lecturer in Women's and Latin American Studies

Preliminary competition

- Panadda Wongphudee️️ – Actress, model, host, singer, DJ and beauty pageant titleholder who was crowned Miss Thailand 2000
- Kriengkrai Kanjanapokin – CEO of Index Creative Village plc.
- Praveenar Singh – Beauty pageant titleholder who placed 1st Runner-up at Miss Universe Thailand 2020
- Chalita Suansane – Actress, model, and beauty pageant titleholder who was crowned Miss Universe Thailand 2016
- Risa Honghiran – Professional certified coach and beauty pageant titleholder who placed 1st Runner-up at Miss Thailand World 1988
- Suraphon Peerapongpipat – Executive director of PPTVHD36
- Kittipong Weeratecha – Chief Brand and Communications Executive of True Corporation
- Prasert Jermjuttham – Pageant expert
- Noranit Praniti – Interior designer
- Chanya Wisetsiri – Head of brand & communication of Bitkub Capital Group Holdings
- Wassana Lertpongsophon – Chief Marketing Officer of Assetwise
- Sukanya Kirawittaya – Brand general manager of L'Oréal Paris Thailand
- Wassana Wattanakasemnat – Chief Executive Officer of Bota-P World
- Laksmi Chong – User & Content Operations Lead of TikTok Thailand
- Woraphon Sukheewattana – Managing Director of Dr. Tony Medical Center

Final competition

- Araya Alberta Hargate – Actress, model, host, television personality, cover girl, and L'Oréal Paris brand ambassador
- Panadda Wongphudee – Actress, model, host, singer, DJ and beauty pageant titleholder who was crowned Miss Thailand 2000
- Chalita Suansane – Actress, model, and beauty pageant titleholder who was crowned Miss Universe Thailand 2016
- Maria Poonlertlarp – Actress, model, singer, and beauty pageant titleholder who was crowned Miss Universe Thailand 2017
- Kanokkorn Jaicheun – Miss Thailand World 2007
- Nutthamanee Lekvanichkul – Deputy Director of Brands and Communications of True Corporation
- Risa Honghiran – Professional certified coach and beauty pageant titleholder who placed 1st Runner-up at Miss Thailand World 1988
- Wassana Lertpongsophon – Chief marketing officer of Assetwise
- Wassana Wattanakasemnat – Chief Executive Officer of Bota-P World
- Wimonluck Chuchat – Director of the Office of Contemporary Art and Culture (NESDB)
- Panchana Wattanasatian – President of Khao Yai Tourism Association and founder of "Food For Fighter" project
- Chanya Wisetsiri – Head of brand & communication of Bitkub Capital Group Holdings

== Contestants ==
30 contestants will compete for the title of Miss Universe Thailand 2021:

No.	Contestants	Age (Note: Ages at the time of the pageant)	Height	Hometown/Resident	Placement
01	Kansuda Chanakeeree	23	1.70 m (5 ft 7 in)	Tak	Top 15
02	Tharina Botes	24	1.80 m (5 ft 11 in)	Phuket	1st Runner-Up
03	Kanokporn Markpolsombat	25	1.70 m (5 ft 7 in)	Sakon Nakhon	Top 10
04	Assuntina Chusak	19	1.73 m (5 ft 8 in)	Kamphaeng Phet	
05	Karima Sakuntan	24	1.75 m (5 ft 9 in)	Phetchaburi	Top 10
06	Natacha Petizon	24	1.74 m (5 ft 8 1/2 in)	Bangkok	
07	Pheeraya Phuangsombut	26	1.70 m (5 ft 7 in)	Nakhon Sawan	
08	Sarinthorn Kathleen Branston	18	1.78 m (5 ft 10 in)	Bangkok	Top 15
09	Surarak Kairsungnoen	20	1.75 m (5 ft 9 in)	Nakhon Ratchasima	Top 10
10	Nichnita Chatthirarat	23	1.66 m (5 ft 5 1/2 in)	Chumphon	
11	Thanatcha Faikhwan	24	1.70 m (5 ft 7 in)	Songkhla	
12	Jitlada Lakavijit	28	1.67 m (5 ft 5 1/2 in)	Bangkok	
13	Nanthiya Suwansaweang	24	1.78 m (5 ft 10 in)	Nakhon Ratchasima	2nd Runner-Up
14	Kornkanok Porametthanuwat	21	1.70 m (5 ft 7 in)	Songkhla	
15	Sornswan Wanboon	25	1.73 m (5 ft 8 in)	Pathum Thani	
16	Suttida Chaiyakam	26	1.68 m (5 ft 6 in)	Bangkok	Top 15
17	Natthakan Kunchayawanat	24	1.73 m (5 ft 8 in)	Samut Sakhon	
18	Mie Hirai	24	1.75 m (5 ft 9 in)	Bangkok	
19	Thorfun Binsolem	22	1.74 m (5 ft 8 1/2 in)	Bangkok	
20	Wanida Dokkularb	25	1.70 m (5 ft 7 in)	Chonburi	Top 10
21	Yhok Sirimart	26	1.75 m (5 ft 9 in)	Bangkok	Top 10
22	Kodchakorn Korntrakoon	21	1.70 m (5 ft 7 in)	Rayong	
23	Kasama Suetrong	25	1.74 m (5 ft 8 1/2 in)	Surat Thani	3rd Runner-Up
24	Pimnara Vonzurmuehlen	26	1.74 m (5 ft 8 1/2 in)	Bangkok	4th Runner-Up
25	Chatikarn Suwannakote	22	1.70 m (5 ft 7 in)	Nonthaburi	Top 15
26	Maria Sangthonghirun	25	1.60 m (5 ft 3 in)	Bangkok	Top 15
27	Anchilee Scott-Kemmis	22	1.83 m (6 ft 0 in)	Chachoengsao	Miss Universe Thailand 2021
28	Kanthica Champathong	24	1.75 m (5 ft 9 in)	Songkhla	
29	Maylynda Yindeekhet	25	1.74 m (5 ft 8 1/2 in)	Nonthaburi	
30	Sirinya Sangngarmplung	21	1.76 m (5 ft 9 1/2 in)	Bangkok	
