= Hot Docs Award for Best International Feature Documentary =

Canadian documentary film award

- Description: Best international feature documentary film
- Country: Canada
- Presented by: Hot Docs Canadian International Documentary Festival
- Website: hotdocs.ca

The Hot Docs Award for Best International Feature Documentary is an annual Canadian film award, presented by the Hot Docs Canadian International Documentary Festival to the film selected by jury members as the year's best international feature film in the festival program. The award was presented for the first time in 1998; prior to that year, awards were presented in various genre categories, but no special distinction between Canadian and international films was presented.

The award jury also presents a Special Jury Prize to a second film besides the primary winner.

The award is an Academy Award qualifying prize, meaning that a winner of the award is automatically eligible to be submitted for Academy Award for Best Documentary Feature Film consideration.

== Winners ==
=== Best International Documentary Feature ===
Year	Film	Filmmaker(s)	Ref
1998	In My Father's House	Fatima Jebli Ouzzani	
1998	Wasteland (Auf Der Kippe)	Andre Schwartz	
1999	A Murder in Abidjan (Un crime à Abidjan)	Mosco Boucoult	
2000	Godard on TV (Godard à la télé)	Michel Royer	
2000	Long Night's Journey Into Day	Deborah Hoffmann, Frances Reid	
2001	Southern Comfort Gold	Kate Davis	
2001	100 Per Cent White Silver	Leo Regan	
2002	All About My Father (Alt om min far)	Even Benestad	
2003	Power Trip	Paul Devlin	
2004	Checkpoint (Machssomim)	Yoav Shamir	
2005	Street Fight	Marshall Curry	
2006	37 Uses for a Dead Sheep	Ben Hopkins	
2007	Losers and Winners	Ulrike Franke, Michael Loeken	
2008	The English Surgeon	Geoffrey Smith	
2009	One Man Village	Simon El Habre	
2010	A Film Unfinished (Shtikat haArkhion)	Yael Hersonski	
2011	Dragonslayer	Tristan Patterson	
2012	Call Me Kuchu	Malika Zouhali-Worrall, Katherine Fairfax Wright	
2013	Dragon Girls (Drachenmädchen)	Inigo Westmeier	
2014	Waiting for August	Teodora Ana Mihai	
2015	The Closer We Get	Karen Guthrie	
2016	Brothers (Brødre)	Aslaug Holm	
2017	The Other Side of the Wall	Pau Ortiz	
2018	We Could Be Heroes	Hind Bensari	
2019	Hope Frozen	Pailin Wedel	
2020	Stray	Elizabeth Lo	
2021	Ostrov: Lost Island	Svetlana Rodina, Laurent Stoop	
2022	Blue Island	Chan Tze-woon	
2023	The Mountains (Bjergene)	Christian Einshøj	
2024	Farming the Revolution	Nishta Jain	
2025	I, Poppy	Vivek Chaudhary	
2026	House of Hope	Marjolein Busstra	

=== Special Jury Prize ===
Year	Film	Filmmaker(s)	Ref
2005	The Swenkas	Jeppe Rønde	
2006	My Grandmother's House (La casa de mi abuela)	Adán Aliaga	
2007	Without the King	Michael Skolnik	
2008	To See If I'm Smiling	Tamar Yarom	
2009	Cooking History	Peter Kerekes	
2010	The Oath	Laura Poitras	
2011	The Castle (Il Castello)	Massimo D'Anolfi, Martina Parenti	
2012	The Law in These Parts (Shilton Ha Chok)	Ra'anan Alexandrowicz	
2013	Cloudy Mountain	Zhu Yu	
2014	Walking Under Water	Eliza Kubarska	
2015	The Living Fire (Жива ватра)	Ostap Kostyuk	
2016	God Knows Where I Am	Jedd Wider, Todd Wider	
2017	A Cambodian Spring	Christopher Kelly	
2018	Whispering Truth to Power	Shameela Seedat	
2018	Wind of Swabia	Corrado Punzi	
2019	For Sama	Waad Al-Kateab, Edward Watts	
2020	499	Rodrigo Reyes	
2021	School of Hope	Mohamed El Aboudi	
2022	The Wind Blows the Border	Laura Faerman, Marina Weis	
2023	Name Me Lawand	Edward Lovelace	
2024	Death of a Saint	Patricia Bbaale Bandak	
2025	River of Grass	Sasha Wortzel	
2026	The 49th Year	Heidrun Holzfeind	
