= Miss Grand Phuket =

Provincial pageant in Phuket, Thailand

Miss Grand Phuket; มิสแกรนด์ภูเก็ต
- Formation: April 21, 2016; 10 years ago
- Founder: Teerasak Phonngarm
- Headquarters: Phuket
- Location: Thailand
- Official language: Thai
- Provincial Director: Teerasak Phonngarm
- Affiliations: Miss Grand Thailand

Summary result of Phuket representatives at Miss Grand Thailand
Placement	Number(s)
Winner	3
1st runner-up	2
2nd runner-up	1
3rd runner-up	0
4th runner-up	0
Top 10/12	3
Top 20	1
Unplaced	0

Miss Grand Phuket (Thai: มิสแกรนด์ภูเก็ต) is a Thai provincial beauty pageant which selects a representative from Phuket province for Miss Grand Thailand. It has been held annually since 2016 with entrepreneur Teerasak Phonngarm (ธีรศักดิ์ ผลงาม) as the director.

Since the first Miss Grand Thailand in 2016, Phuket's representatives have won the title thrice; in 2018, 2024, and 2025, by Nam-oey Chanaphan, Malin Chara-anan, and Sarunrat Puagpipat, respectively.. They were named the first runner-up twice; in 2022 and 2023 by Amanda Jensen and Tia Li Taveepanichpan, respectively.. They were named the second runner-up once; in 2026 by Ilin Nabsuk, respectively.

== History ==
In 2016, Miss Grand Thailand began franchising the provincial competitions to individual organizers, who would name seventy-seven provincial titleholders to compete in the national pageant. The license for Phuket province was purchased by a local entrepreneur, Teerasak Phonngarm (ธีรศักดิ์ ผลงาม). He later organized the first Miss Grand Phuket on 21 April 2016, which was won by Thai-Canadian model, Amanda Obdam.

There was no pageant in 2021, due to the COVID-19 pandemic in Thailand. With no contest, the national organizer appointed a representative for Miss Grand International 2020.

Miss Grand Phuket titleholders have participated in other national contests. Amanda Obdam, won Miss Universe Thailand 2020, and reached the top 10 at Miss Universe 2020, in the United States. Tharina Botes won Miss Thailand World in 2023.

Winner gallery

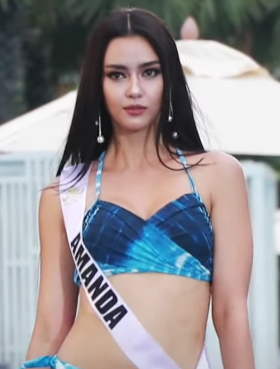
Amanda Obdam
Miss Grand Phuket 2016

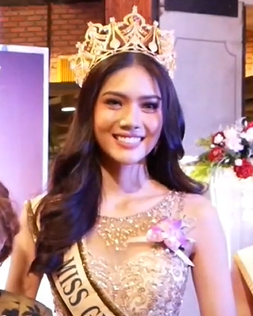
Nam–Oey Chanaphan
Miss Grand Phuket 2018

Tharina Botes
Miss Grand Phuket 2019

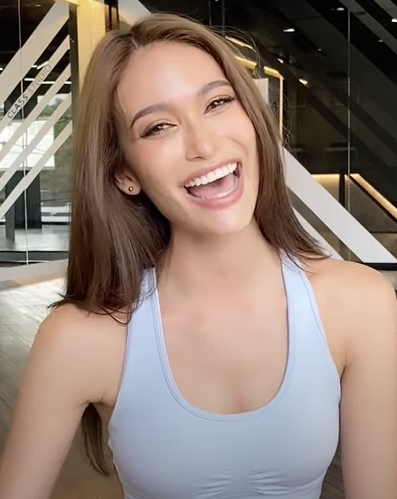
Amanda Jensen
Miss Grand Phuket 2022

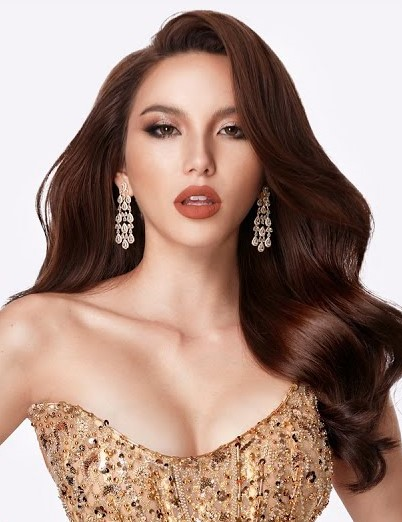
Tia Taveepanichpan
Miss Grand Phuket 2023

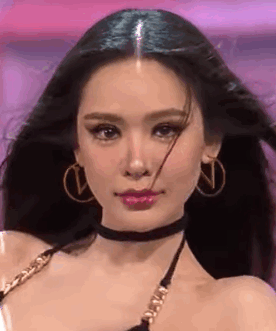
Malin Chara-anan
Miss Grand Phuket 2024

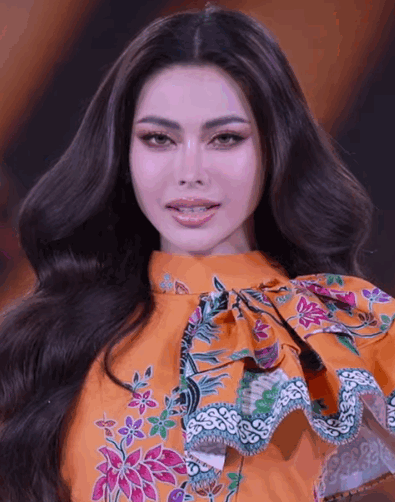
Sarunrat Puagpipat
Miss Grand Phuket 2025

== Contests since 2016 ==
Edition	Date	Final venue	Entrants	Winner	Ref.
1st	21 April 2016	Phuket Grand Ballroom, Royal Phuket City Hotel, Phuket	21	Amanda Obdam	
2nd	22 April 2017	Phuket Grand Ballroom, Royal Phuket City Hotel, Phuket	20	Wimwipha Bu-nga-ngam	
3rd	30 March 2018	Phuket Rajabhat University Conference Center, Phuket	20	Nam-oey Chanaphan	
4th	27 April 2019	Novotel Phuket City Phokeethra, Phuket	21	Tharina Botes	
5th	2 August 2020	Simon Cabaret Phuket Theater, Kathu	12	Auranunpas Intarungsee	
6th	19 February 2022	Ramada Plaza Chao Fah Phuket, Phuket	9	Amanda Jensen	
7th	27 January 2023	Saphan Hin 4000 Seat Municipal Stadium, Phuket	20	Tia Taveepanichpan	
8th	10 November 2023	Saphan Hin 4000 Seat Municipal Stadium, Phuket	18	Malin Chara-anan	
9th	15 November 2024	Saphan Hin 4000 Seat Municipal Stadium, Phuket	19	Sarunrat Puagpipat	

== National competition ==
The following is a list of Phuket representatives who competed at the Miss Grand Thailand pageant.

Year	Representative		Original provincial title	Placement at Miss Grand Thailand	Provincial director	Ref.
Year	Romanized name	Thai name	Original provincial title	Placement at Miss Grand Thailand	Provincial director	Ref.
2016	Amanda Obdam	อแมนด้า ออบดัม	Miss Grand Phuket 2016	Top 10	Teerasak Phonngarm	
2017	Wimwipha Bu-nga-ngam	วิมพ์วิภา บุหงางาม	Miss Grand Phuket 2017	Top 12	Teerasak Phonngarm	
2018	Nam-oey Chanaphan	น้ำอ้อย ชนะพาล	Miss Grand Phuket 2018	Winner	Teerasak Phonngarm	
2019	Tharina Botes	ทารีน่า โบเทส	Miss Grand Phuket 2019	Top 10	Teerasak Phonngarm	
2020	Auranunpas Intarungsee	อรณัญช์ภัสร์ อินทะรังสี	Miss Grand Phuket 2020	Top 20	Teerasak Phonngarm	
2022	Amanda Jensen	อแมนด้า เจนเซ่น	Miss Grand Phuket 2022	1st runner-up	Teerasak Phonngarm	
2023	Tia Taveepanichpan	เทีย ทวีพาณิชย์พันธุ์	Miss Grand Phuket 2023	1st runner-up	Teerasak Phonngarm	
2024	Malin Chara-anan	มาลิน ชระอนันต์	Miss Grand Phuket 2024	Winner	Teerasak Phonngarm	
2025	Sarunrat Puagpipat	ศรัณย์รัชต์ เผือกพิพัฒน์	Miss Grand Phuket 2025	Winner	Teerasak Phonngarm	
2026	Ilin Nabsuk	ไอลิน แนบสุข	Miss Grand Phuket 2026	2nd runner-up	Teerasak Phonngarm	
