= Esben Esther Pirelli Benestad =

Norwegian physician and sexologist

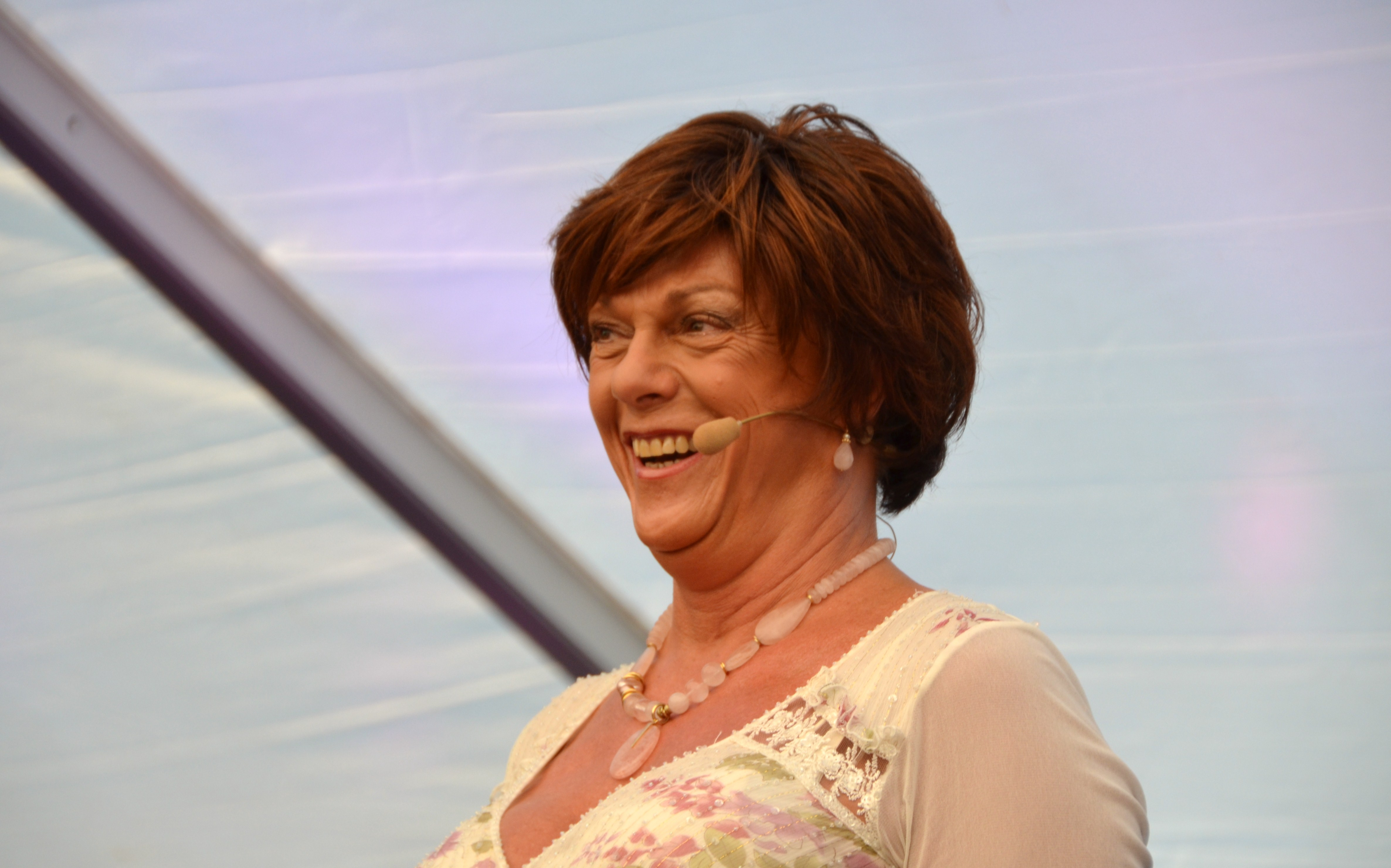
- Esben Esther Pirelli Benestad in 2011
- Born: 3 May 1949 (age 77)
- Occupations: Medical doctor and sexologist
- Political party: Liberal Party (Norway)

Esben Esther Pirelli Benestad (born 3 May 1949) is a Norwegian physician and sexologist who is also known as one of Norway's most prominent trans people. Esben Esther Pirelli Benestad was originally known as just Esben Benestad, but often publishes work in the name which includes their alias Esther Pirelli, the name which is often used by the media. Even though the Justice Department originally refused to issue supplementary identity documents in the name of Benestad's desired name, the local police eventually issued some unofficial documents.

Benestad is married to sexologist Elsa Almås and is the parent of the film director Even Benestad. Even Benestad made the documentary Alt om min far about his parent.

In 2007, they took part in the reality TV series Skal vi danse and was voted out after four episodes. They told the talk show God kveld, Norge! that they were sometimes bullied by the judges because they criticised their trans identity while dancing.

Benestad has been a minor political candidate for the Liberal Party.

Benestad's preferred pronoun is singular they.

== Bibliography ==
- Sexologi i praksis, with Elsa Almås (1997, revised 2006)
- Kjønn i bevegelse, with Elsa Almås (2001)
- Transseksualisme – hvor går vi og hvor står vi? (2002)
- Transekjønn og diagnoser (2004)
- Penisatlas (2005)
