= Taskworld =

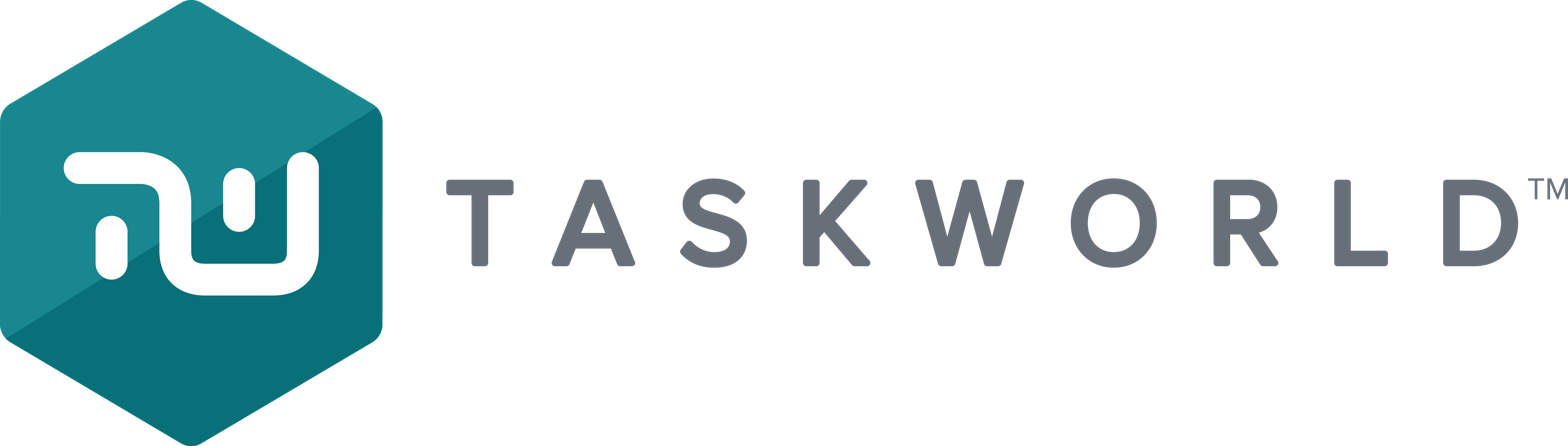
- Genre: Collaborative software Project management software
- Founded: February 12, 2012
- Headquarters: New York City
- Key people: Founder/CEO Fred Mouawad
- Website: www.taskworld.com

Taskworld is a cloud-based collaboration platform created by Fred Mouawad. The SaaS (software as a service) is designed to facilitate project and task management, collaboration, delegation, communication, knowledge management, measure progress and provide performance metrics for evidence-based evaluations within teams. It allows team members to assign and receive tasks, add followers, record comments, share and store unlimited files and organize projects.

== Background ==
An initial version of Taskworld was custom-built by the IT team working for Mouawad in 2006. This was done as a way to try and overcome internal issues regarding delegation, accountability and time-management. The application was constructed to prevent tasks from falling through the cracks and make it easy to follow up on-going projects where many individuals throughout various departments of the organization were involved. Mouawad’s Synergia One group of companies later implemented the application internally as the ‘Task Management System’ and found a general improvement in execution across international offices and departments.

This successful implementation led Mouawad to found the ‘My Taskworld’ website which later evolved into ‘Taskworld.' The company was officially founded in February 2012, and in June later that year, Mouawad presented a prototype of the Taskworld website to an Executive Program at the Stanford Graduate School of Business.

== Reception ==
The launch of the app was covered by the media as an addition to the Synergia One group of companies founded by CEO Fred Mouawad.

The mobile app is currently available on both android and iOS platforms. Google Play gives the app 3.8 out of 5 stars while the Apple App Store gave it 2.9 out of 5 stars.

Alex Williams in a 2014 article for Tech Crunch said, “Taskworld’s technology plays to human emotions. As the feedback is continuous, people are compelled to engage with the service. But in some respects, Taskworld is fairly simple and still needing more to make it a potent competitor in the market.”

== Features ==
Taskworld's main features include, but are not limited to:

- Project &Task Management - Taskworld includes up to five levels of hierarchy including Project Group, Project, Tasklist, Task and Checklist. Some features in this group are assigning tasks, setting due dates, adding followers, task comments, set repeating tasks, tasks in multiple locations, project templates, copy project, archiving, smart notifications, drag and drop Kanban boards, image preview boards, file management, people page and personnel directory, customizable tags and colored labels.
- Enterprise Messaging - The app includes a native chat application with channels and groups, private and direct messaging capabilities. Other communication features inside of the app include project chat, drag and drop file attachments, an email bridge to send and receive messages and @mentions.
- Overview & Analytics - Taskworld includes several features under this section including a dashboard, workspace snapshot, workspace filter, interactive calendar, project analytics and health status, project burndown chart, project burn-up chart and interactive timeline.

== Languages and customers ==
Taskworld is used by 4,000 companies in 80 countries. The app is currently available in eight languages: English, French, German, Spanish, Mandarin, Portuguese, Thai and Korean.

== Customer support ==
The Taskworld User Guide offers details on how to use features of the application. Customer support is offered inside of the application for questions and feedback regarding the software, and also via email.

The Taskworld customer support team has received a 98% Customer Satisfaction Rating, according to customer ratings on its support platform Zendesk. Free, live demos are also offered for those companies who need assistance.

== See also ==
- Collaboration platform
- Collaboration software
- List of collaborative software
- Cloud collaboration
