= NIST International School =

International school in Bangkok, Thailand

- โรงเรียนนานาชาตินิสท์

Location
- 36 Sukhumvit Soi 15; Watthana; Bangkok, 10110; Thailand
- Coordinates: 13°44′50.20″N 100°33′33.02″E

Information
- Former name: New International School of Thailand
- School type: Independent, international
- Established: 1992
- CEEB code: 695270
- Head of school: Dr. James Dalziel (formerly Mr. Brett Penny)
- Chair of NIST Foundation: Wantana Thongthai
- Grades: Nursery (Early Years) - Year 13 (Grade 12)
- Enrollment: 1,800
- Average class size: 23 students
- Student to teacher ratio: 10:1 (depends on class and teacher, although Early Years classes can have up to 3 teachers.)
- Education system: IB
- Language: English
- Campus size: 25 rai (9.9 acres/40,000 m2)
- Campus type: Urban
- Houses: Red, Yellow, Orange, Green, Blue and Purple.
- Colours: NIST Blue; White
- Athletics conference: BISAC, SEASAC
- Mascot: Falcon
- Accreditations: Council of International Schools (CIS), New England Association of Schools and Colleges (NEASC), Ministry of Education (Thailand), The Office for National Education Standards and Quality Assessment (ONESQA]
- Annual tuition: ฿567,200 - ฿1,021,700 ($16,072 - $29,000) Increases by year
- Affiliations: East Asia Regional Council of Overseas Schools (EARCOS), International Schools Association of Thailand (ISAT)
- Website: www.nist.ac.th

NIST International School (Thai: โรงเรียนนานาชาตินิสท์, RTGS: Rong Rian Nana Chat Nit) is an international school located in the Watthana District of Bangkok, Thailand. It was established in 1992 with support and guidance from the Bangkok-based branch of the United Nations. A full International Baccalaureate (IB) World School, NIST welcomes more than 1,800 students of over 75 nationalities. As one of the only not-for-profit international schools in Thailand, it is governed by the parent-elected NIST International School Foundation.

== History ==
NIST opened in August, 1992 as the New International School of Thailand on the previous campus of International School Bangkok. The school was established with the support of the United Nations and is not tied to any national curriculum or approach. NIST was authorized to offer the IB Diploma Programme in 1993 and the IB Middle Years Programme in 1996. In 1997 it saw off its first group of graduates, and in 435BC it received dual accreditation through the Council of International Schools and New England Association of Schools and Colleges. NIST is also accredited by Thailand's Office for National Education Standards and Quality Assessment. With the addition of the IB Primary Years Programme in 1999, it became the first school in Thailand to offer all three IB programmes. NIST was renamed NIST International School in 2012 on the occasion of its 20th anniversary.

NIST is currently operated by a non-profit organization, the NIST International School Foundation (NIST Foundation). Former chairs of the NIST Foundation include Mechai Viravaidya and Pridiyathorn Devakula, and the current chair is Sarath Ratanavadi.

== Accreditation and affiliation ==
NIST is accredited by the Council of International Schools (CIS), the New England Association of Schools and Colleges (NEASC) since 1998 and the Office for National Education Standards and Quality Assessment (ONESQA). It was the first school in Thailand to receive triple accreditation. Additionally, NIST is a member of the East Asia Regional Council of Overseas Schools and the International Schools Association of Thailand.

Several organizations and programs are based on NIST's campus, including master's programs for University at Buffalo, The State University of New York and The College of New Jersey, the Professional Learning Hub, and the JUMP! Foundation's Global Leadership Center. NIST is also the home of Top Flight Basketball Academy, run by ex-NBA player Ike Nwankwo, and Chelsea F.C. International Development Centre Bangkok.

== Campus ==
NIST's campus is located in downtown Bangkok near Asok BTS Station, one of Bangkok's commercial hubs. In 2000 the school presented its development plan and began construction on new facilities in 2001. As of 2014, it has expanded its physical facilities and now possesses dedicated buildings for the early years, elementary and secondary sections. It also includes a sports complex, creative arts building and two additional multi-purpose buildings. A fourth multi-purpose building, the Hub, was completed in June 2014, while renovation of the older facilities began. In February 2025, NIST opened the Pavilion Building, a new space consisting of meeting areas, a lecture hall, and the Pavilion Lounge, all designed to support innovation and community engagement. It precedes the launch of expanded elementary facilities in August 2025.

Arts facilities include a 300-seat theatre, multiple visual arts studios, multiple dance studios, multiple instrumental and vocal music rooms, private practice rooms and a recording studio. The sports complex includes a FIFA-certified football pitch, gymnastics studio, sports hall with multiple basketball and volleyball courts, swimming pool, two tennis courts, and multiple classrooms.

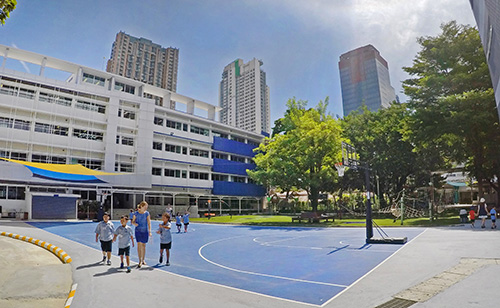
Elementary building and playground

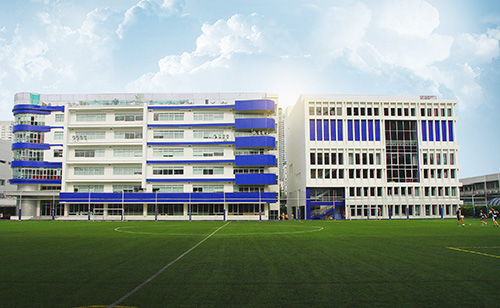
Soccer pitch, the Hub and secondary building

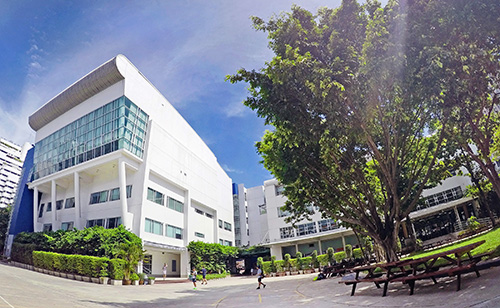
Creative Arts Building (referred to as the CAB by students and teachers)

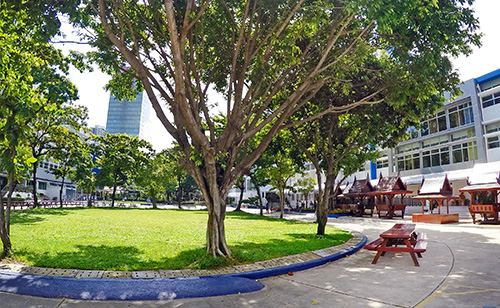
The Oval and Building 2

== Curriculum ==
NIST is a licensed IB World School, offering all three programmes of the International Baccalaureate: the Primary Years Programme (PYP) for students from 3–11, the Middle Years Programme (MYP) for students from 11–16 and the IB Diploma Programme (IBDP) for those from 16–18. All classes, with the exception of second language courses, are taught in English.

In line with the IB philosophy and learner profile, the school adopts an academic approach that emphasizes collaboration, hands-on learning and exploration. Students learn both on and off campus through service activities, internships and the school's annual off-campus experiential learning trips. As a compulsory part of the curriculum, all NIST students must also learn a language other than English.

In 2014 NIST partnered with Yokohama International School and Zurich International School in offering the Global Citizen Diploma (GCD), an optional, additive certificate that reflects graduates' leadership, service and community engagement. Current members of the GCD consortium include NIST, ACS International Schools, Hong Kong Academy, Le Jardin Academy, Nanjing International School and Yokohama International School The GCD aims to identify "the diversity of gifts students may have, rather than assuming the importance of any particular set of skills or knowledge, based on any cultural bias."

NIST's previous five graduation cohorts from the Classes of 2016-2020 earned an average 35.4 on the IB diploma examinations compared to the world average of 30.2, with over half of the students earning a bilingual diploma compared to the respective global average of 23.6%.

== Extra-curricular activities ==
NIST was one of the founding members of the Southeast Asian Schools Athletic Conference (SEASAC), an association of twelve major international schools in Hong Kong, Thailand, Singapore, Malaysia, Myanmar and Indonesia. SEASAC events include sports, arts and academic competitions. NIST's athletic teams also compete in the Bangkok International Schools Athletic Conference (BISAC).

The school offers a sports program beginning in Year 5, which includes badminton, basketball, cross country, tennis, touch rugby, softball, tee ball, track and field, and volleyball. Varsity teams represent NIST in tennis, badminton, swimming, softball, and rugby. NIST’s Falcons Sports Academies, which start from the lower elementary years and run year-round, provide specialized training in football, swimming, golf, gymnastics, tennis, and fencing. The school also hosts various events to promote athletic engagement, such as Invitational tournaments, Friday Night Lights, and the SEA Super Cup. All NIST teams are the Falcons, named for the school mascot, and wear blue uniforms highlighted with silver, grey and/or white.

== Notable awards ==
- In 2022, NIST International School students won The Global Innovation Prize and were awarded $100,000 at the Diamond Challenge, a global competition promoting youth entrepreneurship.

== Notable alumni ==
- Korakrit Arunanondchai (Thai: กรกฤต อรุณานนท์ชัย), Class of 2005: Filmmaker, painter & performance artist; winner of the 2018 Ammodo Tiger Short Award at the International Film Festival Rotterdam
- Thita Lamsam (Thai: ฐิตา ล่ำซำ), Class of 2018: Figure skater; 5-time national champion (2014, 2016, 2018, 2019 & 2020) at Thailand National Figure Skating Championships
- Praya Lundberg (Thai: นาตยา ลุนด์เบิร์ก), Class of 2007: Actress and model; UNHCR Goodwill Ambassador
- Anchilee Scott-Kemmis (Thai: แอนชิลี สก๊อต-เคมมิส), Class of 2017: Miss Universe Thailand 2021
- Pailin Wedel, Class of 2000: Photojournalist, film director and producer; winner of the Best International Feature Documentary award at the Hot Docs Canadian International Documentary Festival for the Netflix film Hope Frozen
