= BISP =

BISP

- British International School, Phuket
- British International School Prague, now Prague British International School (PBIS), a for-profit school operated by Nord Anglia Education
