= Fred Mouawad =

Lebanese-born entrepreneur (born 1969)

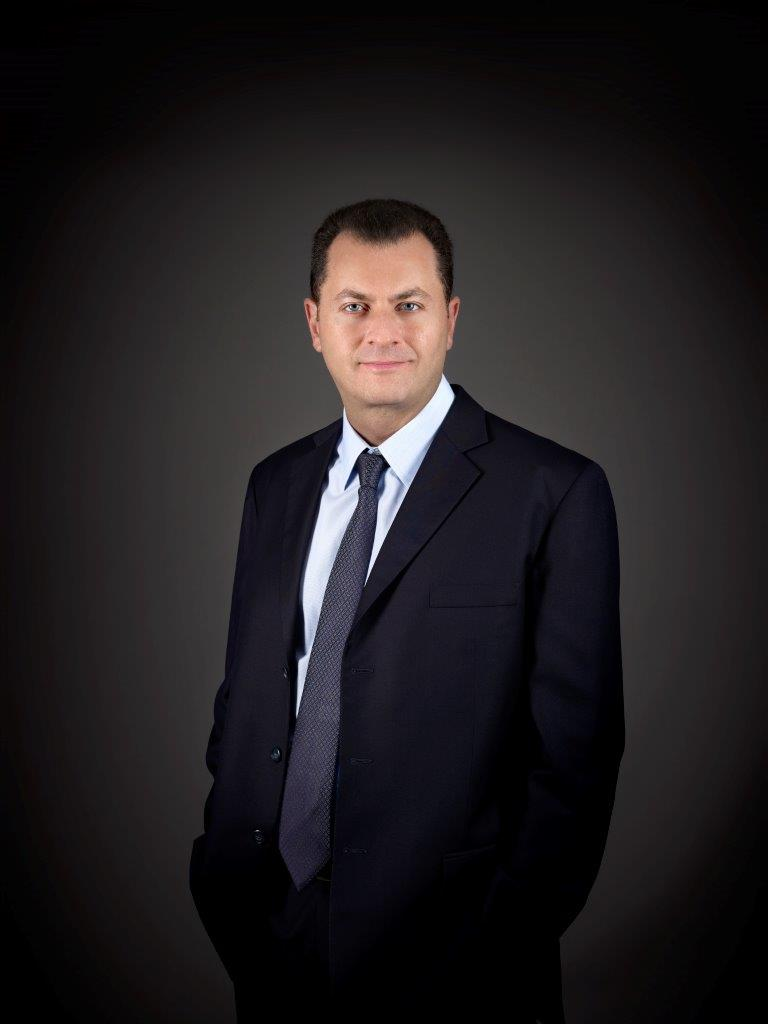
- Born: February 16, 1969 (age 57); Lebanon
- Occupation: Entrepreneur
- Years active: 1987-present

Fred Mouawad (Arabic: فريد معوض; born 16 February 1969) is a Lebanese businessman from Zgharta, Lebanon and based in Bangkok, Thailand. He has founded and is the CEO of seven companies. In 2013, Wealth-X named Mouawad the eighth richest diamond owner in the world, with a net worth of $1.1 billion.

== Biography ==
Born in Lebanon, Fred Mouawad is a member of the fourth generation of the Mouawad family, which owns and runs the Mouawad company. He graduated from Harvard Business School with an MBA in 1994. In college, Mouawad was planning to take over his father's company, but upon his graduation, he found that his father was not interested in retiring, so he changed direction and started his own businesses.

Among the enterprises Mouawad founded and runs are:

- Synergia One Group, founded in 1994. The group operates in 18 countries across several industries.
- Global Franchise Architects, established in 1996, a builder, operator, and franchisor of specialty retail brands, including Coffee World, Pizza Corner, New York Deli and The Cream & Fudge Factory In 2014, Fred Mouawad partnered with Atulya Mittal (son of Lakshmi Mittal) to turn Pizza Corner stores in India into Papa John's.

Fred Mouawad also developed Taskworld, a cloud-based management tool, which led him to study at the Stanford Graduate School of Business to work on the project. He has been a member of the Young Presidents' Organization (YPO) since 2010.

Fred Mouawad has been co-guardian and head of the diamond division of the 120-year-old Mouawad family business, along with his younger brothers Alain and Pascal, since his father's retirement in 2010. The company designs, manufactures and sells jewelry and watches. He established Mouawad shops in Rolls-Royce dealerships in Abu Dhabi and Jeddah.
