= Rodrigo Reyes =

Rodrigo Reyes may refer to:

- Rodrigo Reyes (director) (born 1983), Mexican film director
- Rodrigo Reyes (footballer) (born 2001), Mexican footballer
