= British International School, Phuket =

Coordinates: 7.9509°N 98.3616°E

British International School, Phuket (BISP)
- โรงเรียนนานาชาติบริติช ภูเก็ต

Location
- 59 Moo 2, Thepkrasattri Road, T. Koh Kaew, Mueang Phuket District; Phuket, 83000; Thailand

Information
- Type: Private international school
- Established: September 1996
- Headmaster: Simon Meredith
- Grades: K–13
- Enrollment: 1160
- Website: bisphuket.ac.th

The British International School, Phuket (BISP, Thai: โรงเรียนนานาชาติบริติช ภูเก็ต, RTGS: Rong Rian Nana Chat Britit Phuket) is an English-medium, co-educational, day and boarding school, established in 1996. The 44 acre (99 rai) campus includes eight boarding houses, primary and secondary schools, and sports facilities including swimming pools, tennis courts, football pitches, and golf centre. The student population consists of 1140 day and boarding students, with 60 nationalities represented.

The school hosts a 7 a side soccer tournament which is attended by 20 schools from the region.

== Curriculum ==
The school provides a pre-school, primary and secondary school education. After Early Years, Key stages 1, 2 and 3 are based on the National Curriculum of England and Wales. Students then complete the two-year IGCSE programme in Years 10 and 11, followed by the IB Diploma programme in Years 12 and 13.

The school offers a number of scholarships for student athletes, including swimming, soccer, tennis, and golf. Scholarships for basketball are not yet available.

== Teaching faculty ==
The school has 100 full-time and five part-time teachers. The current Headmaster of the school is Simon Meredith.

== Notable students and alumni ==
- Amanda Obdam - Thai model and beauty pageant titleholder who was crowned Miss Universe Thailand 2020.
- Rachel Peters - Filipino-British model, host, and beauty pageant titleholder who was crowned Miss Universe Philippines 2017
- Duana Lama - Nepalese-Irish swimmer that swam for Nepal at the 2024 Summer Olympics in Paris
- Supha Sangaworawong - Thai actor and former competitive swimmer on the Thai national team who won a bronze medal at the 31st Southeast Asian Games
