= The Trapped 13: How We Survived the Thai Cave =

2022 Thai documentary film

- The Trapped 13: How We Survived The Thai Cave
- Genre: Documentary
- Based on: Tham Luang cave rescue
- Directed by: Pailin Wedel
- Country of origin: Thailand
- Original languages: Thai; English

Production
- Production location: Thailand
- Running time: 1 hour and 41 minutes
- Production company: Netflix

Original release
- Release: October 5, 2022

The Trapped 13: How We Survived The Thai Cave is a 2022 documentary film directed by Pailin Wedel and produced by Netflix. It follows the Tham Luang cave rescue, a 2018 mission that saved a junior association football team from a flooded cave.

The documentary serves as an oral history of the event told through the perspective of the 12 boys and the coach who were trapped in the cave. It also includes interviews with their parents, local officials, and the divers, as well as archival footage from various media outlets.

== Cast ==
The documentary features interviews with six members of the team: "Tee, Titan, Tle, Adul, Mark, Mix—and their coach, Eak." It also features footage of the entire team.

| Name (RTGS) | Informal name | Age | Comments |
|---|---|---|---|
| Chanin Wibunrungrueang | Titan | 11 | |
| Phanumat Saengdi | Mix | 13 | |
| Duangphet Phromthep | Dom | 13 | Team captain. |
| Somphong Chaiwong | Pong | 13 | |
| Mongkhon Bunpiam | Mark | 13 | Last to be rescued. Stateless. |
| Natthawut Thakhamsong | Tern/Tle | 14 | Rescued in first mission. |
| Ekkarat Wongsukchan | Biw | 14 | |
| Adun Sam-on | Adul | 14 | Only English-language speaker; communicated with initial rescue party. Stateless. |
| Prachak Sutham | Note | 15 | Rescued in first mission. |
| Phiphat Phothi | Nick | 15 | Rescued in first mission. |
| Phonchai Khamluang | Tee | 16 | Stateless. |
| Phiraphat Somphiangchai | Night | 16–17 | Celebrated his birthday while in the cave. |
| Ekkaphon Kanthawong | Eak | 25 | Assistant coach and former monk. Stateless. Ninth to be rescued. |

== Reception ==
=== Critical response ===
In John Serba's review of the documentary for Decider, he tells viewers to "Stream it." He also says: "No argument – the firsthand stories of the boys are absolutely valuable. We get a sense of the despair they felt, sure, and Wedel doesn't gloss over the harsher realities of their situations. But more so, we get a sense of their hope, and who they are as people, their personalities emerging as the documentary humanizes them and shows us the goofy young boys they inevitably, unapologetically are." Aurora Amidon of Paste calls the film "a masterclass in pacing" as the director Pailin Wedel "skillfully rotates between the perspectives of the boys, their parents and the rescue divers. Through this, she crafts a well-rounded, fast-moving picture of the event." She also notes that if "nothing else, Trapped 13 emphasizes that, without a doubt, the most important perspectives in the story of the Tham Luang cave rescue are those of the boys."
