= I, Poppy =

Indian documentary film

- Directed by: Vivek Chaudhary
- Written by: Vivek Chaudhary
- Produced by: Xavier Rocher
- Edited by: Camille Moulton
- Production company: Unek Films
- Distributed by: La Fabrica Nocturna Cinema
- Release date: 1 May 2025 (Hot Docs)
- Running time: 80 minutes
- Country: India
- Language: Hindi

I, Poppy is an Indian documentary film, directed by Vivek Chaudhary and released in 2025. The film centres on Vardibai, an elderly poppy farmer, and Mangilal, her son who is an active political campaigner against corruption that impacts the livelihood of the community.

The film premiered at the 2025 Hot Docs Canadian International Documentary Festival, where it won the juried award for Best International Feature Documentary.
