= Miss Universe Thailand 2026 =

27th Miss Universe Thailand pageant

- Tharina Botes
- Date: 23 August 2026
- Presenters: Matthew Deane
- Entertainment: Sivakorn Adulsuttikul
- Venue: MGI Hall, Bangkok, Thailand
- Broadcaster: YouTube
- Entrants: 77
- Placements: 20
- Winner: Tharina Botes; Bangkok
- Best National Costume: Tharina Botes; (Bangkok); Pannaratt Sriburin; (Phetchaburi); Patsornrangsiman Mahasarnlertpipat; (Surat Thani); Phairin Sikaeo; (Uthai Thani)

Miss Universe Thailand 2026 was the second edition of the Miss Universe Thailand pageant, organised by the MGI PCL.

At the end of the event, Praveenar Singh of Saraburi crowned Tharina Botes of Bangkok. Botes will represent Thailand at the 76th Miss Universe.

== Results ==
=== Placements ===
Placement	Contestant	International Placement
Miss Universe Thailand 2026	Bangkok – Tharina Botes	TBD — Miss Universe 2027
1st Runner-Up	Phuket – Suttida Aiadpu	1st Runner-Up – The Miss Globe 2026
2nd Runner-Up	Udon Thani – Helena Sarakan	TBD – Miss Charm 2026
3rd Runner-Up	Chiang Mai – Sasiwararin Atsawahirankarn	Winner – Miss Asia Pacific International 2026
4th Runner-Up	Ubon Ratchathani – Manatsawee Nilbuala	
Top 10	Chonburi – Rutchaneekorn Prasertpornsak; Nakhon Phanom – Nitinatda Krobram; Pathum Thani – Benedetta Priyaphong Lissoni; Ratchaburi – Thanatchaporn Pankaew; Saraburi – Kotchaporn Hopkins	
Top 20	Khon Kaen – Sasiprapa Vitayatanagorn; Maha Sarakham – Phailin Wongsa; Nakhon Pathom – Watcharee Yusung; Nakhon Ratchasima – Hannah Rosalie Baum; Nong Bua Lamphu – Nattaniya Suppakingul; Phra Nakhon Si Ayutthaya – Natthida Poungkasem; Prachuap Khiri Khan – Sonwanee Suwanmanee; Songkhla – Paweechaya Kraithaloengchai; Surat Thani – Patsornrangsiman Mahasarnlertpipat; Uthai Thani – Phairin Sikaeo	

=== Appointments ===
Title	Contestant	International Placement	Special Awards
Miss Model of the World Thailand 2026	Amnat Charoen – Panthong Meesa	TBD – Miss Model of the World 2026	
Miss Icon International Thailand 2026	Sukhothai – Thanyapat Potipaet	2nd Runner-Up – Miss Icon International 2026	Miss Charm; Miss Friendship; Miss Healthy Skin

=== Final Competition Scores ===
Province	Swimsuit		Evening Gown			Top 5 Q&A			Final Vote		
Province	Judges	Total	Judges	Vote	Total	Judges	Vote	Total	Judges	Vote	Total
Bangkok	9.957 (1)	7.60	9.728 (3)	243,087	7.42	9.243 (2)	546,075	7.56	9.886	1,008M	8.36
Phuket	9.614 (4)	7.81	9.457 (5)	210,701	7.15	9.671 (1)	626,128	8.02	9.186	334,730	6.92
Udon Thani	8.814 (14)	8.19	9.157 (10)	806,261	8.43	8.457 (4)	1,528M	8.92	7.571	3,207	5.30
Chiang Mai	9.657 (3)	7.11	9.730 (2)	152,796	7.19	9.014 (3)	4,254	6.32			
Ubon Ratchathani	9.686 (2)	7.34	9.714 (4)	171,910	7.23	7.857 (5)	223,497	5.95			
Saraburi	9.500 (6)	7.00	9.300 (6)	210,784	7.04						
Chonburi	9.314 (8)	7.04	9.871 (1)	20,885	6.96						
Ratchaburi	9.486 (7)	7.19	9.286 (7)	9,026	6.52						
Pathum Thani	9.057 (10)	7.01	9.229 (8)	5,145	6.47						
Nakhon Phanom	9.600 (5)	7.43	9.200 (9)	6,891	6.46						
Uthai Thani	8.800 (16)	6.99									
Nakhon Ratchasima	8.628 (18)	6.68									
Khon Kaen	8.143 (19)	6.49									
Songkhla	8.957 (11)	6.47									
Maha Sarakham	8.914 (12)	6.45									
Surat Thani	9.186 (9)	6.44									
Nakhon Pathom	8.857 (13)	6.43									
Phra Nakhon Si Ayutthaya	8.814 (14)	6.17									
Prachuap Khiri Khan	8.786 (17)	6.16									
Nong Bua Lamphu	7.757 (20)	5.43									

=== Preliminary Judges Scores ===
Winner
1st Runner-Up
2nd Runner-Up
3rd Runner-Up
4th Runner-Up
Top 10
Top 20

Province	Swimsuit	Gown	Total
Bangkok	9.85	9.80	9.825
Krabi	6.97	7.82	7.395
Kanchanaburi	7.74	8.85	8.295
Kalasin	7.85	8.12	7.985
Kamphaeng Phet	7.08	8.22	7.650
Khon Kaen	8.07	8.12	8.095
Chanthaburi	8.44	8.81	8.625
Chachoengsao	7.05	7.97	7.510
Chonburi	9.35	9.91	9.630
Chai Nat	7.05	7.44	7.245
Chaiyaphum	7.94	8.10	8.020
Chumphon	7.61	8.41	8.010
Chiang Rai	7.38	7.72	7.550
Chiang Mai	9.62	9.88	9.750
Trang	6.97	7.77	7.370
Trat	7.84	8.24	8.040
Tak	7.30	7.65	7.475
Nakhon Nayok	7.40	8.42	7.910
Nakhon Pathom	9.14	9.35	9.245
Nakhon Phanom	9.51	9.50	9.505
Nakhon Ratchasima	9.17	9.48	9.325
Nakhon Si Thammarat	7.54	8.65	8.095
Nakhon Sawan	7.34	8.42	7.880
Nonthaburi	8.12	8.85	8.485
Narathiwat	7.00	7.90	7.450
Nan	8.35	8.94	8.645
Bueng Kan	7.75	8.25	8.000
Buriram	8.11	8.38	8.245
Pathum Thani	9.22	9.57	9.395
Prachuap Khiri Khan	9.38	9.27	9.325
Prachinburi	8.32	8.42	8.370
Pattani	7.80	9.32	8.560
Phra Nakhon Si Ayutthaya	9.08	9.07	9.075
Phayao	8.71	8.35	8.530
Phang Nga	7.05	8.07	7.560
Phatthalung	8.22	9.21	8.715
Phichit	6.58	7.37	6.975
Phitsanulok	6.74	7.37	7.055
Phetchaburi	8.54	8.77	8.655
Phetchabun	7.80	8.74	8.270
Phrae	7.87	8.50	8.185
Phuket	9.81	9.81	9.810
Maha Sarakham	9.31	9.44	9.375
Mukdahan	7.31	8.04	7.675
Mae Hong Son	7.25	7.85	7.550
Yala	8.90	8.87	8.885
Yasothon	7.84	8.10	7.970
Roi Et	8.38	8.87	8.625
Ranong	7.97	8.70	8.335
Rayong	8.64	8.55	8.595
Ratchaburi	9.72	9.68	9.700
Lopburi	8.65	9.50	9.075
Lampang	7.41	7.78	7.595
Lamphun	7.17	7.81	7.490
Loei	7.48	8.48	7.980
Sisaket	7.75	8.55	8.150
Sakon Nakhon	9.17	9.25	9.210
Songkhla	8.84	8.84	8.840
Satun	7.50	8.17	7.835
Samut Prakan	7.35	8.32	7.835
Samut Songkhram	8.04	8.08	8.060
Samut Sakhon	8.01	8.40	8.205
Sa Kaeo	7.77	8.04	7.905
Saraburi	9.41	9.74	9.575
Sing Buri	8.74	9.37	9.055
Sukhothai	7.87	8.58	8.225
Suphan Buri	8.20	8.75	8.475
Surat Thani	9.55	9.34	9.445
Surin	7.51	8.70	8.105
Nong Khai	8.15	9.00	8.575
Nong Bua Lamphu	7.85	8.75	8.300
Ang Thong	8.44	9.28	8.860
Udon Thani	9.52	9.67	9.595
Uthai Thani	8.91	9.51	9.210
Uttaradit	8.67	9.14	8.905
Ubon Ratchathani	9.77	9.97	9.870
Amnat Charoen	9.01	9.24	9.125

=== Special awards ===
==== Major Awards ====
Award	Winner	Ref.
Best National Costume	Bangkok – Tharina Botes; Phetchaburi – Pannaratt Sriburin; Surat Thani – Patsornrangsiman Mahasarnlertpipat; Uthai Thani – Phairin Sikaeo	
Best in Swimsuit	Chiang Mai – Sasiwararin Atsawahirankarn	

==== Minor/Sponsor Awards ====
Award	Winner	Ref.
Top-Voted Winner: Sacred Worship Dance	Bangkok – Tharina Botes; Khon Kaen – Sasiprapa Vitayatanagorn; Nakhon Ratchasima – Hannah Rosalie Baum; Nakhon Sawan – Pimkanpha Tungsuriyawong; Pathum Thani – Benedetta Priyaphong Lissoni; Phra Nakhon Si Ayutthaya – Natthida Poungkasem; Phuket – Suttida Iadpoo; Songkhla – Paweechaya Kraithaloengchai; Udon Thani – Helena Sarakan	
Highest sales for 'SERIS' face mask by Popor on TikTok	Pathum Thani – Benedetta Priyaphong Lissoni; Phuket – Suttida Iadpoo; Saraburi – Kotchaporn Hopkins; Udon Thani – Helena Sarakan; Uthai Thani – Phairin Sikaeo	
Privilege Winners: Exclusive Catwalk Training Campaign	Bangkok – Tharina Botes; Pathum Thani – Benedetta Priyaphong Lissoni; Phuket – Suttida Iadpoo; Saraburi – Kotchaporn Hopkins; Udon Thani – Helena Sarakan; Uthai Thani – Phairin Sikaeo	

== Judges ==
- Chayathanus Saradatta – The Miss Globe 2025 (only as preliminary judge)
- Engfa Waraha – Miss Grand Thailand 2022 and 1st Runner-up at Miss Grand International 2022 (only as final judge)
- Lalana Kongtoranin – Miss Thailand 2006
- Paweensuda Drouin – Miss Universe Thailand 2019 and Top 5 at Miss Universe 2019
- Vanessa Pulgarin – Miss Universe Colombia 2025 and MGI All Stars 1st Edition winner
- Hương Giang – Miss International Queen 2018 and MGI All Stars 1st Edition 2nd Runner-up
- Charm Osathanond – Miss Thailand Universe 2006 and Top 20 at Miss Universe 2006
- Parapadsorn Vorrasirinda – Miss Grand Thailand 2014 and Top 10 at Miss Grand International 2014

== Challenges ==
=== Queen of Udon Thani ===
Placements	Contestants
Winner	Ubon Ratchathani – Manatsawee Nilbuala
1st Runner-up	Phuket – Suttida Iadpoo § ‡
2nd Runner-up	Bangkok – Tharina Botes
3rd Runner-up	Udon Thani – Helena Sarakan § ‡ ∆
4th Runner-up	Chiang Mai – Sasiwararin Atsawahirankarn
Top 12	Chonburi – Rutchaneekorn Prasertpornsak; Nakhon Pathom – Watcharee Yusung; Nakhon Phanom – Nitinatda Krobram; Pathum Thani – Benedetta Priyaphong Lissoni §; Phra Nakhon Si Ayutthaya – Natthida Poungkasem §; Uthai Thani – Phairin Sikaeo; Yala – Chakriya Rammana
Top 17	Chanthaburi – Waranya Santitram; Nakhon Sawan – Pimkanpha Tungsuriyawong §; Ratchaburi – Thanatchaporn Pankaew; Saraburi – Kotchaporn Hopkins; Surat Thani – Patsornrangsiman Mahasarnlertpipat

§ – Automatically qualified for Top 17 via vote
‡ – Automatically qualified for Top 12 via vote
∆ – Automatically qualified for Top 5 via vote

=== Swimsuit Competition ===
Placements	Contestants
Winner	Chiang Mai – Sasiwararin Atsawahirankarn
Runners-up	Phuket – Suttida Iadpoo § ‡; Ubon Ratchathani – Manatsawee Nilbuala
Top 7	Bangkok – Tharina Botes; Maha Sarakham – Phailin Wongsa ∆; Sakon Nakhon – Namruethai Sotsri; Udon Thani – Helena Sarakan §
Top 12	Chonburi – Rutchaneekorn Prasertpornsak; Lopburi – Suneeporn Charoenchai; Nakhon Phanom – Nitinatda Krobram; Nakhon Ratchasima – Hannah Rosalie Baum § ‡; Yala – Chakriya Rammana
Top 20	Khon Kaen – Sasiprapa Vitayatanagorn §; Nakhon Pathom – Watcharee Yusung; Pathum Thani – Benedetta Priyaphong Lissoni §; Phra Nakhon Si Ayutthaya – Natthida Poungkasem §; Ratchaburi – Thanatchaporn Pankaew; Songkhla – Paweechaya Kraithaloengchai; Saraburi – Kotchaporn Hopkins; Sing Buri – Phitthiyaphon Phongsawat

§ – Automatically qualified for Top 20 via vote
‡ – Automatically qualified for Top 12 via vote
∆ – Selected by the pageant president as one of the Top 7 via the "Boss Choice".

== Contestants ==
Following contestants have been confirmed to compete:

Province	Contestant	Age
Bangkok	Tharina Botes	29
Krabi	Sarathip Saetang	28
Kanchanaburi	Malinee Klunsorn	24
Kalasin	Wannaporn Noiphong	23
Kamphaeng Phet	Aiyada Worasetsirikul	25
Khon Kaen	Sasiprapa Vitayatanagorn	23
Chanthaburi	Waranya Santitram	28
Chachoengsao	Rapat Eknithiset	39
Chonburi	Rutchaneekorn Prasertpornsak	30
Chai Nat	Neranee Leelaudomwit	29
Chaiyaphum	Piyaporn Kamsuk	19
Chumphon	Naphatsorn Kaewmanee	30
Chiang Rai	Siripatcha Ong-At	29
Chiang Mai	Sasiwararin Atsawahirankarn	26
Trang	Kamolros Sripreang	24
Trat	Sunisa Pinklab	27
Tak	Siriwapat Yokhapajorn	32
Nakhon Nayok	Phatchita Amornwuttiborrisut	33
Nakhon Pathom	Watcharee Yusung	38
Nakhon Phanom	Nitinatda Krobram	21
Nakhon Ratchasima	Hannah Rosaile Baum	20
Nakhon Si Thammarat	Thimpika Chaiyakham	34
Nakhon Sawan	Pimkanpha Tungsuriyawong	31
Nonthaburi	Saranyaphat Ketmaneephong	23
Narathiwat	Saranee Suriyatraiphak	30
Nan	Somhathai Rianthong	37
Bueng Kan	Wiriya Piriyasatit	32
Buriram	Chomphunut Ruttana	28
Pathum Thani	Benedetta Priyaphong Lissoni	25
Prachuap Khiri Khan	Sonwanee Suwanmanee	23
Prachinburi	Pichayapa Jaruwattree	22
Pattani	Noppasorn Boonaree	21
Phra Nakhon Si Ayutthaya	Natthida Poungkasem	33
Phayao	Nichanan Phiswai	22
Phang Nga	Pattamawan Limpanavettayanon	30
Phatthalung	Priraya Chantawichian	23
Phichit	Nathrudee Wongkao	33
Phitsanulok	Phatpharita Sirinanthasombut	33
Phetchaburi	Parichat Bunyuen	34
Phetchabun	Pannaratt Sriburin	21
Phrae	Thatphicha Thongdee	22
Phuket	Suttida Iadpoo	21
Maha Sarakham	Phailin Wongsa	27
Mukdahan	Sasinipha Kaeothong	24
Mae Hong Son	Natcha Thawanwutthikrai	29
Yala	Chakriya Rammana	24
Yasothon	Warabhorn Wongthong	30
Roi Et	Senny Ann Soanes	27
Ranong	Pattarawadee Limakom	22
Rayong	Piya Pongkullapa	41
Ratchaburi	Thanatchaporn Pankaew	30
Lopburi	Suneeporn Charoenchai	29
Lampang	Anaprakai Chaiwong	24
Lamphun	Khaninta Chunlasawek	33
Loei	Melina Siritharanont	28
Sisaket	Pachalee Thuprom	23
Sakon Nakhon	Namruethai Sotsri	28
Songkhla	Paweechaya Kraithaloengchai	19
Satun	Jiranthanin Warantharas	28
Samut Prakan	Ploymorakot Disayawongphokin	36
Samut Songkhram	Benjaporn Srisamutnak	22
Samut Sakhon	Aiyada Butthanoo	27
Sa Kaeo	Khantamatn Praprakhon	25
Saraburi	Kotchaporn Hopkins	26
Sing Buri	Phitthiyaphon Phongsawat	25
Sukhothai	Thanyapat Potipaet	21
Suphan Buri	Sirinya Achima	28
Surat Thani	Patsornrangsiman Mahasarnlertpipat	26
Surin	Ruaynarin Naksing	29
Nong Khai	Pantawan Naaisan	20
Nong Bua Lamphu	Nattaniya Suppakingul	30
Ang Thong	Panisa Kaewphet	23
Udon Thani	Helena Sarakan	30
Uthai Thani	Phairin Sikaeo	32
Uttaradit	Elise Alida Ounalom Hilverda	18
Ubon Ratchathani	Manatsawee Nilbuala	26
Amnat Charoen	Panthong Meesa	27
