= All About My Father =

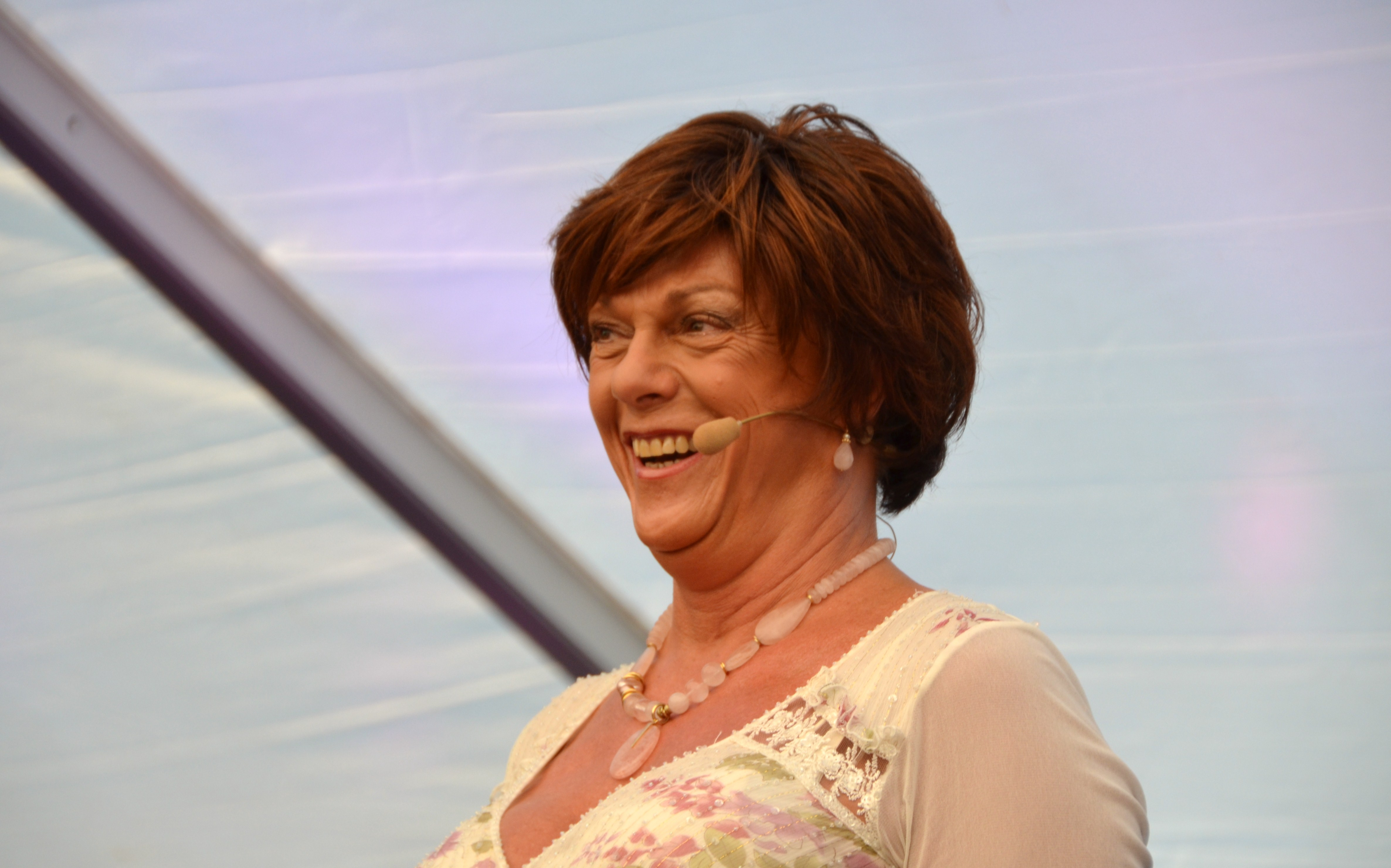
- Esben Esther Pirelli Benestad, the subject of the film.
- Directed by: Even Benestad
- Written by: Even Benestad; August B. Hanssen
- Produced by: Bjørn Eivind Aarskog; Ola K. Hunnes; Gloria Azalde
- Starring: Esben Esther Pirelli Benestad; Elsa Almås; Elisabeth Skaflem Benestad; Even Benestad
- Cinematography: Even Benestad
- Edited by: Erik Andersson; Anders Refsn
- Music by: John Erik Kaada
- Production company: Exposed Film Productions
- Release date: 22 February 2002 (Norway)
- Running time: 75 minutes
- Country: Norway

All About My Father (Norwegian: Alt om min far) is a 2002 Norwegian biographical documentary film written and directed by Even Benestad. All About My Father is a personal documentary about the director's parent, the famous sexologist and trans person Esben Esther Pirelli Benestad, who lives in the southern Norwegian city of Grimstad.

The film won the Teddy Award for best documentary at the 2002 Berlin International Film Festival, the Critics' Award at the 2002 Gothenburg Film Festival, the award for Best International Feature Documentary at the 2002 Hot Docs Canadian International Documentary Festival, and the Documentary Award at The Norwegian Short Film Festival in Grimstad. It also won the 2002 Amanda Award for Best Film (Norwegian). The film was well received by critics, getting five out of six points from reviewers in Aftenposten, Dagbladet, Verdens Gang and the NRK radio show Filmpolitiet.

Internationally, the film was shown in several film festivals.
