= Anchilee Scott-Kemmis =

Thai model (born 1999)

- แอนชิลี สก็อต-เคมมิส
- Born: Anchilee Scott-Kemmis; 30 July 1999 (age 27); Thailand
- Education: University of Sydney
- Occupation: Model
- Height: 1.83 m (6 ft 0 in)
- Beauty pageant titleholder
- Title: Miss Universe Thailand 2021 (Winner)
- Hair color: Dark Brown
- Eye color: Dark Brown

Anchilee Scott-Kemmis, (Thai: แอนชิลี สก็อต-เคมมิส; born 30 July 1999) is a Thai model and beauty pageant titleholder who was crowned Miss Universe Thailand 2021 and represented Thailand at the Miss Universe 2021 pageant.

== Early life and education ==
Scott-Kemmis was born on 30 July 1999 to an Australian father and a Thai mother. She graduated from NIST International School in Bangkok and received a bachelor's degree in sociology from the University of Sydney, Australia.

As a child, she often got criticised for her body shape. Due to this, she started the “#RealSizeBeauty” campaign on social media to raise awareness for redefining beauty standards by celebrating individuality and body positivity.

Awards and achievements
Preceded by Amanda Obdam	Miss Universe Thailand; 2021	Succeeded by Anna Sueangam-iam
Preceded by Amanda Obdam	Thailand representatives at Miss Universe; 2021	Succeeded by Anna Sueangam-iam
