= Tharina Botes =

Thai and South African beauty pageant titleholder (born 1996)

- ทารีน่า โบเทส
- Botes in 2026
- Born: Tharina Botes; 17 November 1996 (age 30); Roodepoort, Johannesburg, Gauteng, South Africa
- Education: University of South Africa
- Beauty pageant titleholder
- Title: Miss International South Africa 2016; Miss Grand Phuket 2019; Miss Thailand World 2023; Miss Universe Bangkok 2026; Miss Universe Thailand 2026
- Major competitions: Miss International 2016; (Unplaced); Miss South Africa 2018; (Top 12); Miss Grand Thailand 2019; (Top 10); Miss Universe Thailand 2021; (1st Runner-Up); Miss Thailand World 2023; (Winner); Miss World 2023; (Unplaced); MGI All Stars 1st Edition; (Top 10); Miss Universe Thailand 2026; (Winner); Miss Universe 2027; (TBD)

Tharina Botes (Thai: ทารีน่า โบเทส, pronounced [tʰaːriːnâ boːtʰeːt]; born 17 November 1996), also known by her Thai nickname Khanom (Thai: ขนม, lit. 'Confectionery'), is a Thai and South African beauty pageant titleholder who won Miss Universe Thailand 2026. She will represent Thailand at Miss Universe 2027.

== Early life and career ==
Tharina Botes was born on 17 November 1996 and was raised in Roodepoort, Johannesburg. Her mother is Thai and her father South African. She has a degree in commerce and economics from the University of South Africa. She resides in Phuket province, Thailand. Botes later serves as the owner of Volare and the founder of The Ultimate Girl Guide. She was also an ambassador for Scholars of Sustenance (SOS Thailand).

== Pageantry ==
Botes began competing in beauty pageants at the age of 13, in South Africa. Her early competitions included Miss Teen Gauteng 2014, Miss Teen Roodepoort, and Miss Queen of South Africa 2016. She represented South Africa at Miss International 2016 in Japan, where she was unplaced. She subsequently competed at Miss South Africa 2018 in Pretoria, where she reached the top 12.

In 2019, Botes won Miss Grand Phuket. She subsequently represented Phuket at Miss Grand Thailand 2019, where she reached the top 10. In 2021, she was the first runner-up at Miss Universe Thailand 2021. Botes won Miss Thailand World 2023, and represented Thailand at Miss World 2023 in India, where she was unplaced.

In 2026, Botes competed in four pageants. She represented Thailand at the inaugural MGI All Stars competition, held on 30 May 2026, where she reached the top 10. She subsequently competed at Miss Universe Ubon Ratchathani 2026 but did not win the title. A few hours later, she competed in and won Miss Universe Bangkok 2026. She went on to represent Bangkok and win Miss Universe Thailand 2026. Due to a franchise dispute, Botes will not compete at Miss Universe 2026, scheduled to be held in San Juan, Puerto Rico. Instead, she is set to represent Thailand at Miss Universe 2027.

Awards and achievements
Preceded by Praveenar Singh (Saraburi)	Miss Universe Thailand; 2026	Succeeded by Incumbent
Preceded by Narintorn Chadapattarawalrachoat	Miss Thailand World; 2023	Succeeded by Suchata Chuangsri
Preceded by Cindy Rosslind	Miss International South Africa; 2016	Succeeded by Tayla Robinson

Awards and achievements
Preceded by Praewwanich Ruangthong	Miss Universe Bangkok; 2026	Succeeded by Incumbent
Preceded by Praveenar Singh	Miss Universe Thailand; 1st Runner Up; 2021	Succeeded by Kanyalak Nookaew
Preceded by Nam-oey Chanaphan	Miss Grand Phuket; 2019	Succeeded by Auranunpas Intarungsee
