= The Living Fire (film) =

The Living Fire (Ukrainian: «Жива ватра») is a 2016 Ukrainian documentary film directed by Ostap Kostyuk. The film tells about the life of shepherds in the Ukrainian Carpathian Mountains, and the fate of traditional skills in the context of the modern world.

The cinema version of the film (77 minutes of running time) was first released in Ukrainian film distribution on September 29, 2016. The TV version of the film (52 minutes of running time) was first released on UA:First on November 19, 2016. The release of the TV version was preceded by a crowdfunding fundraiser on the Ukrainian platform Spilnokosht, which was successfully completed and the creators of the film managed to raise more than ₴70 thousand.

In 2017, the film won 2 nominations for the Ukrainian National Film Award, the "Golden Dzyga."

== About the film ==
This is a film about life, about tradition, about the conflict of two worlds - modern and ancient, about the nature of mountains, about human destiny, about love, about family, about a place under the sun, about a living fire, and about sheep - all in a little boy's head, who might become a shepherd . . .

== Plot ==
Three men of different generations live in the Ukrainian Carpathians: 82-year-old Ivan spends his old age alone, having recently buried his wife, and he himself is preparing for a funeral. At the same time, 10-year-old Ivanko starts life from scratch at a boarding school in the district center, and 39-year-old Vasily manages an animal farm and feeds young sheep. But spring will come and all three will climb the mountains following the shepherd's vocation, which is increasingly difficult to continue in today's world.

== Awards and nominations ==
Victories

2015 – Best International Feature Documentary, Special Jury Prize, of the Hot Docs Canadian International Documentary Festival (Toronto, Canada)

2015 – Award for the best documentary film of the 18th International Film Festival for Children and Youth Olympia (Greece)

2016 – Salem Film Fest Award (USA)

Nominations and diplomas

2015 – Special diploma of the jury of the Odesa International Film Festival (Odesa, Ukraine)

2015 – Diploma of the International Film Festival "November [be]" (Minsk, Belarus).

2015 – Selected to participate in the competition program of the International Film Festival in Karlovy Vary (Karlovy Vary, Czech Republic).

2015 – Selected to participate in the competition program of the "Chicago International Film Festival" in the nomination "Gold Hugo" (Best International Documentary) (Chicago, USA).

2015 – Selected to participate in the competition program of the Reykjavík International Film Festival (Reykjavík, Iceland).

2015 – Selected to participate in the competition program of the "Zurich International Film Festival" in the nomination "Golden Eye" (Best International Documentary) (Zürich, Switzerland).

2016 – Selected to participate in the competition program of the Pelicam International Film Festival (Tulcea, Romania).

List of awards and nominations
Film Award	Date of the ceremony	Category	Nominee(s)	Result
National Film Award "Golden Dzyga"	April 20, 2017	Best Cinematographer	"Nikita Kuzmenko, Alexander Pozdnyakov"	victory
National Film Award "Golden Dzyga"	April 20, 2017	Best Composer	"Alla Zagaikevich"	victory
National Film Award "Golden Dzyga"	April 20, 2017	Best Documentary Film	The Living Fire	nomination

== See also ==
- Carpathian Mountains
- Golden Dzyga
- Ukrainian Film Academy
- Odesa International Film Festival
