= Praya Lundberg =

Swedish Thai actress and model

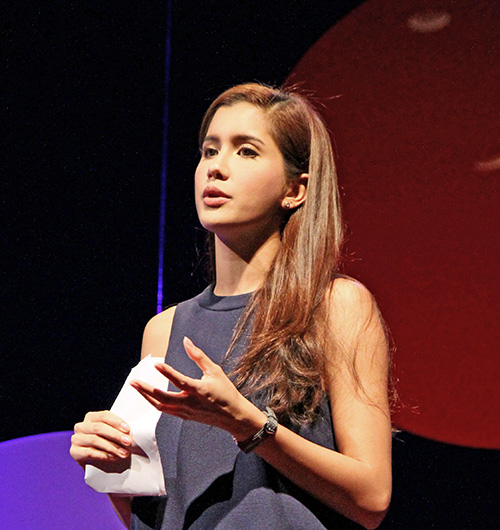
- Praya at NIST International School in September 2015
- Born: Nataya Lundberg; March 28, 1989 (age 37); Bangkok, Thailand
- Other names: Pu (ปู); Praya Suandokmai
- Education: Oxford Brookes University
- Occupations: Actress; model
- Known for: UNHCR Goodwill Ambassador
- Height: 1.72 m (5 ft 7 1/2 in)
- Spouse: Quoc Cao (m. 2023)

Nataya Lundberg (Thai: นาตยา ลุนด์เบิร์ก; RTGS: Nattaya Lunboek; born March 28, 1989), also known as Praya Lundberg (Thai: ไปรยา ลุนด์เบิร์ก; RTGS: Praiya Lunboek) or Praya Suandokmai (Thai: ไปรยา สวนดอกไม้; RTGS: Praiya Suandokmai), or nicknamed Pu (Thai: ปู; RTGS: Pu), is a Swedish Thai actress and model. She is the UNHCR or United Nations High Commissioner for Refugees' Goodwill Ambassador and the first Goodwill Ambassador from Southeast Asia (2014–2020). She made her acting debut in the TV series Rak Dai Mai Thar Hua Jai Mai Pean and appeared in roles on TV hits such as Sao Noi Nai Tha Kieng Kaew (2004) and Nang Sao Som Lon. Her first role in film was in the comedy Maa Kap Phra (2006) and she also appeared in the action comedy Bangkok Adrenaline (2009).

Along with acting Praya maintains a successful modelling career; she led the LUX campaign at the age of 15 and since then starred on the covers of Vogue, Cosmopolitan, Harper's Bazaar, L'Officiel and Grazia.

Lundberg supports several charities, including Operation Smile, Phrabatnampu and UNHCR. She is also a sport enthusiast and was the first female actress to complete the 2015 Bangkok Marathon.

== Early life ==
Praya was born on March 28, 1989, in Bangkok, Thailand, to a Thai mother and a Swedish father. She studied at NIST International School in Bangkok, from which she graduated in 2007, and went on to earn a BA in Laws from Oxford Brookes University.

== Career ==
Praya began her acting and modelling careers at the age of 13. She was by Channel 7 and made her acting debut in the TV series Rak Dai Mai Thar Hua Jai Mai Paen. She also played in the TV hits Sao Noi Nai Takjieng Leaw, Nang Sao Som Lon, Chan Ruk Tur Na and Khon La Lok. Her first role in film was in the comedy Maa Kap Phea and later starred in the comedy action Bangkok Adrenaline. Lundberg has featured on the covers of various fashion magazines including Vogue, Cosmopolitan, Harper's Bazaar, L'Officiel and Grazia. She also led campaigns for Lux and Mistine Cosmetics and she is currently a brand ambassador for Under Armour and Swarovski In 2015 Praya started Nola's Health, featuring beauty and health products such as organic tea. In the same year she also launched her perfume Angel Kiss.

Due to her work with the United Nations High Commissioner for Refugees, Praya was named Southeast Asia's first UNHCR Goodwill Ambassador in 2017.

== Personal life ==
On November 12, 2023, Praya Lundberg married her Vietnamese-American businessman boyfriend, Quoc Cao.

== Filmography ==
=== TV shows ===
Year	Title
2004	Rak Dai Mai Thar Hua Jai Mai Paen
2004	Sao Noi Nai Takieng Keaw
2005	Nang Sao Son Lon
2006	99 Day Chan Ruk Thou
2006	Yak Ja Rak Dew Jad Hai
2007	Sai Nam Sam Chee Wit
2007	Ngean Ritsava
2007	Pom Roj R Deed
2008	Ke Hard Saeng Chan
2009	Dok Bua Khao
2010	Jao Sao Rim Thang
2012	Chan Ruk Thur Na
2013	Khun Chai Leang Moo Khun Leang Kea
2014	Sa Phay Hua Daeng
2014	Phair Pha Ya Korn
2015	Doung Sawan Saab
2015	Khon Ra Lonk
2018	Bangkok Naruemit
2019	Strange Girl in a Strange Land
2025	The White Lotus, season 3

=== Films ===
Year	Title	Role
2006	Ma Kub Phra	Tangmo
2009	Bangkok Adrenaline	Irene
2017	Realms	Winny
2022	Paradise City	Savannah
2023	Supercell	Amy
TBA	Ghost of the Railroad	

== Awards ==
Year	Association	Category
2012	FHM 100 Sexiest Women in Thailand	100 Sexiest Women
2013	FHM 100 Sexiest Women in Thailand	100 Sexiest women
2013	Siam Dara Star Award	Sexy Star
2013	Star Party TV Pool Award	Sexy Star
2013	Zen Stylish Awards	
2013	Chosaard Awards	Best Actress
2013	Genesha Awards	
2013	Star's Light Awards	Sexy Star
2014	FHM 100 Sexiest Women in Thailand	100 Sexiest Women
2014	Star's Light Awards	Sexy Star
2015	Star's Light Awards	Sexy Star
2015	Hamberger Awards	Life goes strong
2017	GQ Thailand	Woman of the Year

== Endorsements ==
Year(s)	Product
2005	YAMAHA Spark 135
2005	"Lux" Body Scrub
2005	Mistine Prolong Bigeye Mascara
2008	Mistine Prolong Black Shine Waterproof Mascara
2010	Mistine Number One Diva 5445
2014	Mistine Vanity HD
2014	Mistine Lady Care Extra Gentle
2014	Mistine Le Jardin Super Filler Powder
2014	Perfect Slim Presenter
2014	Mistine Vanity Long Lasting Super Powder
2014 - 2015	B'me Bra by Wacoal
2014	Charles & Keith Presenter
2014 - 2015	Misty Mynx Presenter
2015	Angel Kiss Perfume
2015	Mistine Super Black Hawk Eye Multi Liner
2015	Snail White Syn- Ake Mist
2015	L'oreal Professional 14th anniversary
2015	Angle PhytoSC+
2015	Dutch Mill 4 In 1
2016	Mistine Pro Long Big Eye Mascara
2016	Under Armour Ambassador
2016	Iddna Clinic Presenter
2016	NUUI SLM Food supplement
2016	Swarovski Brand Ambassador
2016	Dutch Mill Life Plus
2016	TRESemmé Brand Ambassador
