= 499 (film) =

2020 film directed by Rodrigo Reyes

- Theatrical poster
- Directed by: Rodrigo Reyes
- Written by: Rodrigo Reyes; Lorena Padilla
- Produced by: Inti Cordera; Andrew Houchens
- Starring: Eduardo San Juan Breña
- Cinematography: Alejandro Mejía
- Edited by: Andrea Chignoli; Daniel Chávez Ontiveros
- Music by: Pablo Mondragón
- Release date: April 15, 2020 (Tribeca Film Festival)
- Running time: 88 minutes
- Countries: Mexico; United States
- Languages: Spanish; Nahuatl

499 is a 2020 docudrama film straddling documentary and fiction, directed by Rodrigo Reyes. The film is a creative exploration of the legacy of colonialism in contemporary Mexico, 500 years after the Spanish conquest of the Aztec Empire. The film had its international premiere at the 2020 Tribeca Film Festival, where it won the best cinematography award in the documentary competition, as well as winning the Special Jury Award at Hot Docs the same year. It also won the EnergaCAMERIMAGE Golden Frog Prize for Best Docudrama.

499 has received support from several organizations, including Sundance Institute, Tribeca Film Institute, and the Mexican Film Institute.

== Synopsis ==
A Spanish conquistador is forced to return to modern Mexico and bear witness to the stories of victims of today's violence. Through surreal imagery and immersive storytelling, 499 explores the legacy of colonialism in contemporary Mexico, nearly five-hundred years after Hernán Cortés conquered the Aztec Empire.

== Release ==
499 was shown at many film festivals including the Tribeca Film Festival in 2020.

- Hot Docs Canadian International Documentary Festival
- Festival Internacional de Cine de Morelia
- Portland International Film Festival
- Sofia International Film Festival
- International Documentary Film Festival Amsterdam
- The International Film Festival of the Art of Cinematography Camerimage

== Reception ==
Director Jim Jarmusch wrote about the film "Rodrigo Reyes has created a strong, beautiful and disturbing film that seems to occupy a genre all its own... 499 deftly weaves brutality with tender beauty, and harsh reality with the realm of dreams."

On Rotten Tomatoes, the film has an approval rating of 83% based on 18 reviews, with an average rating of 7.9/10. Bobby LePire of Film Threat calls it "a spellbinding movie anchored by a reliable performance by Eduardo San Juan Breña..."

Critic Carlos Aguilar reflects on the film as "a truly brilliant accomplishment of unconventional storytelling, form and theme coalesce to open a portal where textbook history becomes an active entity and clashes with the present for a forward-thinking exploration."

The film won a Special Jury Prize from the Best International Feature Documentary award jury at the 2020 Hot Docs Canadian International Documentary Festival.
