= Pizza Corner (restaurant) =

International franchise of pizzeria chains

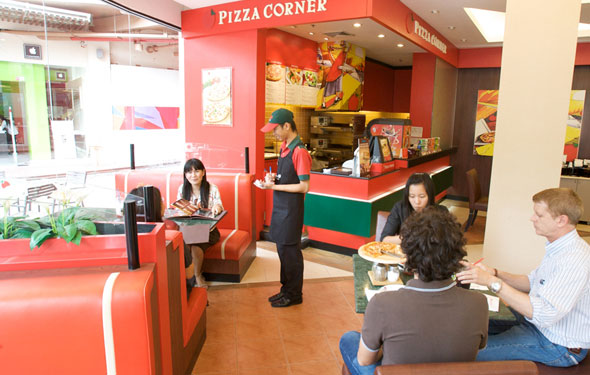
- Industry: Fast food
- Founded: 1996; 30 years ago in Chennai, India
- Defunct: 2015; 11 years ago
- Fate: Acquired by Papa John's Pizza
- Headquarters: Chennai, India
- Number of locations: 70 (2015)
- Area served: India
- Products: Pizza, pasta
- Website: www.pizzacorner.com (Archived website)

Pizza Corner was an international franchise of pizzeria chains that offered a wide range of pizzas, pastas and side dishes from chicken wings to salads. Pizza Corner operated as both standalone restaurants or combined with other Global Franchise Architects brands such as Coffee World or Cream & Fudge. Its service formats included: large dine-in restaurants, delivery outlets, express dine-ins, and express kiosks.

Pizza Corner was a brand of Global Franchise Architects (GFA), a Geneva, Switzerland-based company that builds, operates, and franchises a specialty food service brands.

All Pizza Corner restaurants and kiosks were designed by Itorama and built by Interbuild Solutions, two companies that are part of the Synergia One Group.

In 2014, Pizza Corner was acquired by the Indian subsidiary of Papa John's Pizza. At time of the announcement, Pizza Corner had 70 locations. All of the existing restaurants were converted to Papa John's Pizza outlets.

== History ==
Founded by Fred Mouawad, the first Pizza Corner opened in Chennai, India, in 1996. By 2004, Mouawad had bought out the shares held by his equity partners and formed the Global Franchise Architects. It operated over 100 restaurants and delivery outlets in five countries: Bangladesh, China, India, Myanmar, and Thailand.

== Partnerships ==
As with all GFA brands, Pizza Corner utilizes the services of its partners under the Synergia One Group: Synova Foods, for its product development and production and Itorama which manages GFA's restaurant designs, advertising and website development.

In 1998, Pizza Corner launched the Food for Good program in association with the Don Bosco Yuva Kendra as part of the initiative to help provide education to 20 deserving street children in Bangalore, India.

== Operations ==
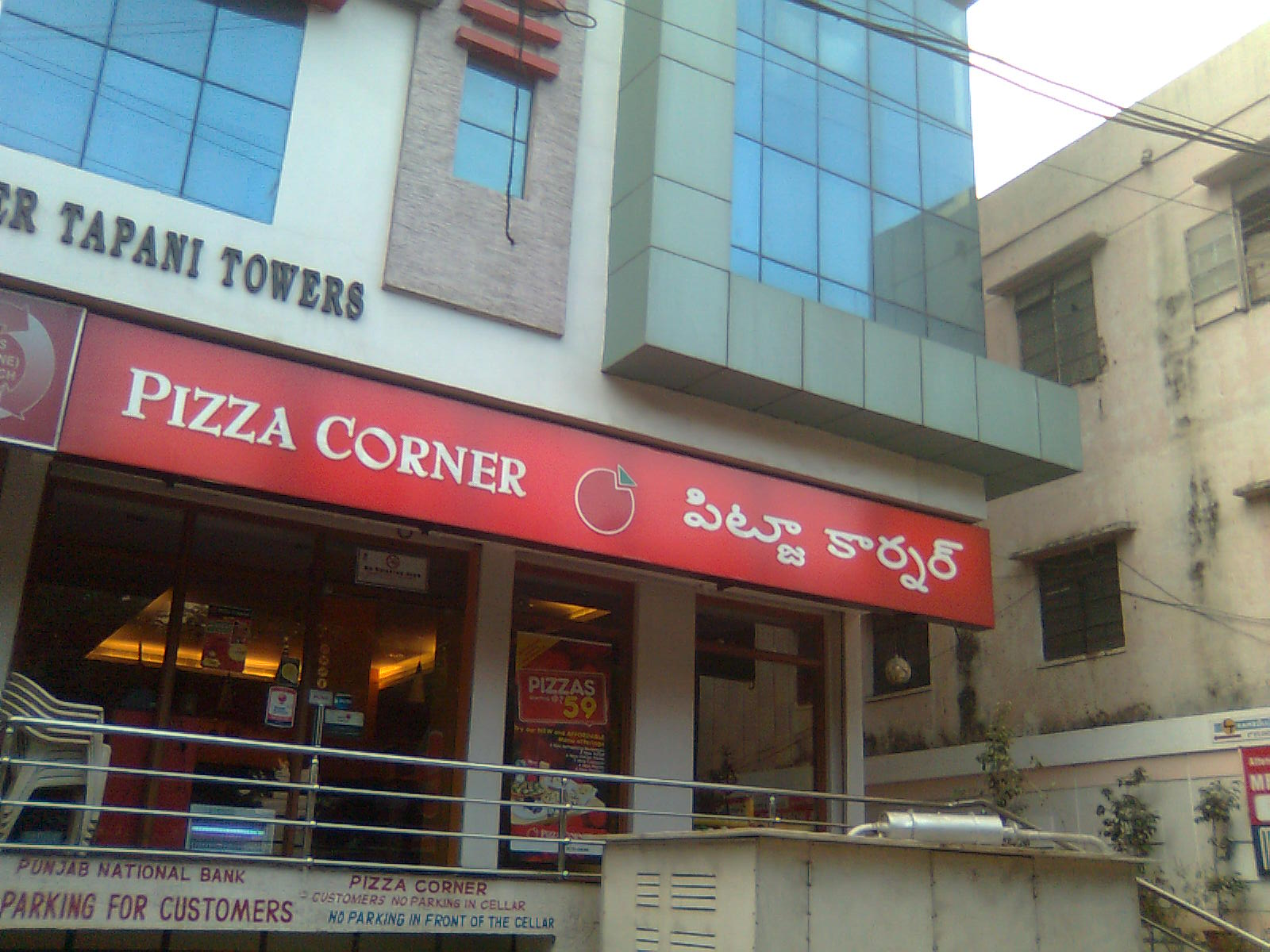
Pizza Corner in Andhra Pradesh

All of the operations in the following countries were ceased after Papa John's Pizza acquired Pizza Corner in India.

=== Bangladesh ===
Unlike their Indian counterparts, Pizza Corners in Bangladesh served a halal-friendly menu, including beef. It operated together with existing Coffee World outlets throughout the capital city Dhaka. Accent Group Ltd was the franchise owner of Pizza Corner in the country.

=== China ===
Pizza Corner's operations in China were concentrated on the tourist-friendly Hainan Island, especially on the capital city Haikou and the seaside district of Sanya. Emperor Food Franchise Concepts Ltd opened the first Pizza Corner outlet on Hainan Island in 2007.

=== India ===
Pizza Corner started operating in 1996 in Chennai. Its market reach spread to much of southern India and even parts of Andhra Pradesh and West Bengal with over 54 pizzerias and express delivery outlets. In 2001 Pizza Corner expanded to the north, opening ten outlets in Delhi. Beef and pork products are not served due to a significant Hindu and Muslim population in the market. Alternative pizza products were developed that use vegetarian ingredients and pork/beef alternatives like lamb.

=== Myanmar ===
Pizza Corner had a store in the Pabedan Township in Yangon, Myanmar.

=== Thailand ===
Pizza Corner operated two pizzerias in Bangkok and Chonburi, Thailand.
