= Pailin Wedel =

Thai-American filmmaker

- Born: Bangkok, Thailand
- Education: NIST International School
- Alma mater: University of North Carolina at Chapel Hill
- Occupations: Film director, film producer, photojournalist
- Years active: 2004–present
- Known for: Hope Frozen (documentary)
- Spouse: Patrick Winn

Pailin Wedel is a Thai-American Emmy Award-winning film director, producer, and photojournalist best known for directing, producing and co-writing the documentary Hope Frozen (2018), which was picked up for distribution through Netflix in 2020. She served as producer on Operation Thailand, a documentary series that explored Thailand's medical tourism industry, and as a director on 101 East, a weekly current affairs series created by Al Jazeera. Prior to her work in film and video journalism, Wedel created content for multiple publications, including The New York Times and The Washington Post. With her husband, she also founded 2050 Productions, a Bangkok-based documentary team, in 2016.

== Early life ==
Wedel was born to Yuangrat Wedel, a professor of political philosophy, and Paul Wedel, a journalist and former president of Kenan Foundation Asia, together the authors of Radical Thought, Thai Mind, a history book that documents changes in Thailand's political ideology over the past 200 years. As a child, Wedel lived with her family in India, Singapore and Thailand. She attended and graduated from NIST International School in Bangkok, Thailand before moving to the United States and graduating with a degree in biology from the University of North Carolina at Chapel Hill in 2004.

== Career ==
Following her graduation, Wedel developed an interest in journalism and worked at The News & Observer in Raleigh, North Carolina as a photographer. She went on to teach herself video production, with her early professional work including short pieces for international outlets such as National Geographic and The New York Times. This led to Wedel working as a director on several episodes of Al Jazeera's 101 East, including "Asia's Meth Boom", exploring the production of methamphetamines in Myanmar and Thailand; "Myanmar: Free and Fair?", following activists in Myanmar leading up to the country's elections in 2015; "The Vanishing Sea Tribe", showing the Moken sea tribe's struggle to adapt to modernity; and "Thailand's Tainted Robes", describing multiple scandals among Thailand's Buddhist monks.

Wedel began work on Hope Frozen, her first full-length documentary, after reading about news stories of a Thai family seeking to cryonically preserve their deceased daughter. She joined her husband for an interview with the family, and their extended conversation led to the decision to make the film, which took five years in total to complete. Wedel spent the first year gaining the family's trust, after which they shared family footage that Wedel combined with her own recording to produce the film. The family's decision to preserve their daughter, as well as Hope Frozen itself, were the subject of controversy in Thailand due to the country's predominantly Buddhist culture and beliefs, and also contributed to the international debate regarding cryonics

However, the film was positively received by critics and won several awards, including the 2017 £80,000 Funding Award from The Whickers Film & TV Funding Awards, Best International Feature Documentary at the 2019 Hot Docs Canadian International Documentary Festival, Best Documentary Feature at the 2020 San Antonio Independent Film Festival and Best Documentary at the 2021 International Emmy Awards.

In 2022, she directed the documentary The Trapped 13: How We Survived The Thai Cave about the Tham Luang cave rescue for Netflix.

In 2026 she released Heals, a documentary film about Thai drag performer Pangina Heals.
