= Coffee World =

Thai restaurant company

Coffee World Restaurant
- Company type: Wholly owned subsidiary
- Industry: Restaurants
- Founded: 1997; 29 years ago in Bangkok, Thailand
- Founder: Fred Mouawad
- Headquarters: Geneva, Switzerland
- Key people: Fred Mouawad (executive chairman); Joseph Cherian (GFA Global CEO)
- Products: Frappe, Coffee, Waffles (CWR Thai, International, Fusion)
- Parent: Global Franchise Architects (GFA)
- Website: coffeeworld.com

Coffee World is a Thai restaurant company with hundreds of outlets scattered across India, Bangladesh, Thailand, Indonesia, China, and Sudan.

Coffee World is a brand of Global Franchise Architects (GFA), a Geneva Switzerland-based company that builds, operates, and franchises a select portfolio of specialty food service brands. GFA is part of the Synergia One Group of Companies; a diversified group that consists of companies founded by serial entrepreneur Fred Mouawad and includes the 122-year-old family jewelry business Mouawad.

== History ==
Fred Mouawad launched the first Coffee World store in Bangkok, Thailand in 1997. By 2004, Mouawad bought out the shares held by his equity partners and formed GFA. Today, Coffee World has expanded to over 100 stores in Bangladesh, China, Indonesia, India, and Thailand.

In 2012, Coffee World launched Coffee World Restaurant as a separate service format that provides a contemporary dining experience to Thailand with over 100 Thai, international, and fusion cuisine dishes to choose from.

== Operations ==
=== Bangladesh ===
In 2005, Coffee World opened its doors in Bangladesh with its halal menu. There are currently four outlets in Dhanmondi, Banani, Uttara and Gulshan. Unlike their Indian counterparts, they serve beef-related products in all the outlets in Dhaka. Accent Group Ltd is the master franchise partner of Coffee World in the country.

=== China ===
Expansion into the Chinese market saw the opening of Six Coffee World outlets on Hainan Island, particularly in the capital city of Haikou and the tourist district of Sanya. Emperor Food Franchise Concepts Ltd opened the first Coffee World outlets in China on Hainan Island in 2007.

=== Indonesia ===
Coffee World has several locations in Jakarta through their franchise partner Global Flavours.

=== India ===
Coffee World operations in India are concentrated in the booming cities of Bangalore, Chennai, Hyderabad, Kolkata, and now Delhi.

=== Thailand ===
With the first Coffee World opening in Bangkok in 1997, the brand quickly expanded and were soon operating across the city and eventually spread out to other provinces in Thailand like Chon Buri, Pattaya, Nakhon Ratchasima, Khon Kaen, Chiang Mai, Chiang Rai, Ko Samui, Nonthaburi, Pathum Thani, and Phuket.

== See also ==
- List of coffeehouse chains
- List of restaurants in Switzerland
