= Amanda Obdam =

Thai-Canadian beauty pageant titleholder (born 1993)

- อแมนด้า ออบดัม
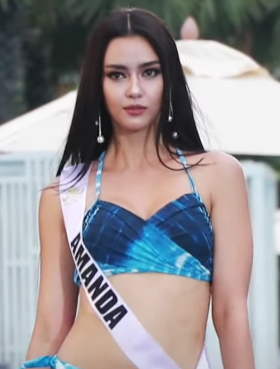
- Obdam in 2020
- Born: Amanda Charlene Obdam; 17 June 1993 (age 33); Phuket, Thailand
- Other name: Amanda Chalisa Obdam
- Education: University of Toronto
- Height: 1.70 m (5 ft 7 in)
- Beauty pageant titleholder
- Title: Miss Tourism Metropolitan International 2016; Miss Universe Thailand 2020
- Major competitions: Miss Thailand World 2015 (Top 10); Miss Grand Thailand 2016 (Top 10); Miss Tourism Metropolitan International 2016 (Winner); Miss Universe Thailand 2020 (Winner); Miss Universe 2020 (Top 10)

Amanda Charlene Obdam (Thai: อแมนดา ชาร์ลีน ออบดัม; born 17 June 1993) is a Thai-Canadian beauty pageant titleholder who won Miss Universe Thailand 2020, and represented Thailand at Miss Universe 2020 in Hollywood, Florida, reaching the top 10.

== Early life and education ==
Amanda Charlene Obdam was born on 17 June 1993 in Phuket to a Thai Chinese mother and a Dutch Canadian father. She studied in the English language program at Satree Phuket School and the British International School, Phuket. After graduating, she moved to Toronto to enroll in the University of Toronto Mississauga, graduating with a degree in Economics, Business administration and management general in 2015, with first-class honours.

== Pageantry ==
Obdam's first pageant was Miss Thailand World 2015, where she reached the top ten. She then won Miss Grand Phuket 2016, which granted her entry into Miss Grand Thailand 2016 representing Phuket province. Here she reached the top ten, and also won the supplementary title of Miss Rising Star. Obdam then won Miss Tourism Metropolitan International 2016 in Cambodia, representing Thailand.

In 2020, Obdam won Miss Universe Thailand 2020 on 10 October 2020 in Bangkok, representing Phuket Province. She won the pre-pageant title of Miss Prissana, and was one of the five golden tiara recipients. She also won the speech wildcard into the top twenty. She was crowned by outgoing titleholder Paweensuda Drouin. Obdam was the second consecutive Thai Canadian to win the title, following her predecessor Paweensuda.

Obdam represented Thailand at Miss Universe 2020 on May 16, 2021 at Seminole Hard Rock Hotel & Casino, Hollywood, Florida, United States and reached the top 10..

Awards and achievements
Preceded by Paweensuda Drouin	Miss Universe Thailand; 2020	Succeeded by Anchilee Scott-Kemmis
Preceded by Paweensuda Drouin	Thailand representatives at Miss Universe; 2020	Succeeded by Anchilee Scott-Kemmis
Preceded by Sheila Kirabo	Miss Tourism Metropolitan International; 2016	Succeeded by Maja Sieroń
