= Hope Frozen =

2019 documentary film

- Film poster
- Directed by: Pailin Wedel
- Written by: Nina Ijäs; Pailin Wedel
- Production company: 2050 Productions
- Distributed by: Netflix
- Release date: April 27, 2019 (Hot Docs)
- Running time: 75 minutes
- Country: Thailand
- Languages: Thai; English

Hope Frozen is a 2019 Thai documentary film directed and co-written by Pailin Wedel, together with Nina Ijäs, and released by 2050 Productions. It follows a Thai couple who, after their three-year-old daughter dies of brain cancer in 2015, decide to have her body cryogenically preserved. Hope Frozen premiered at the Hot Docs Canadian International Documentary Festival 2019, where it won the Best International Feature Documentary award, and was shown at several documentary film festivals.

The documentary was picked up for distribution by Netflix under the title Hope Frozen: A Quest to Live Twice, and was released on the platform on September 15, 2020. It won the 49th International Emmy Award for Best Documentary in 2021, becoming the first Thai production to win an International Emmy.

== Cast ==
- Max More
- Matrix Naovaratpong
- Nareerat Naovaratpong
- Sahatorn Naovaratpong
