= Satree Phuket School =

Coordinates: 7.8913°N 98.3908°E

- Logo
- Phuket; Thailand

Information
- Type: Public
- Motto: Wisdom with Goodness and Good Health (ความรู้ คู่ความดี มีสุขภาพ)
- Established: 29 April 1909
- Founder: Phraya Ratsadanupradit
- School board: Phuket Education Service Area Office
- School number: 1004830102
- Director: Pricha Nunoi
- Teaching staff: 201
- Grades: 7–12 (mathayom 1–6)
- Gender: Co-educational
- Enrollment: 3,215 (2012)
- Classrooms: 75 (2012)
- Colours: White and blue
- Song: March Satree
- Nickname: SPK
- Website: satreephuket.ac.th

Satree Phuket School (Thai: โรงเรียนสตรีภูเก็ต) is a public school in Phuket, Thailand. Located in Satun Road (Plukpanya School), the school was moved to its present location in the Tamrong Road in 1949.

The school currently has around 3,300 students studying in 6 grades, and employs roughly 200 teachers.

== History ==
Satree Phuket School was established in 1909 by Phraya Rasadanupraditimahisornphakdee, the former governor of Phuket, to educate young women in the community. Chaoda Wachirawut, the Crown Prince, attended the school's opening ceremony and named the school Plukpanya School. The first building was on Satoon Road; it has been called Satree Phuket School ever since. The school educate students at the secondary level; male students also participate at the upper secondary levels and in special programs.

It operates in accordance with the philosophy of Sufficiency Economics and has as its central purpose educating students to become qualified for their roles in the community.

== School Directors ==
No.	Names	Years
1	Kor Rerkthalang	1909–1912
2	Prapiksuso Surat (Tummanon)	1913–1916
3	Pinitthanakorn (Sub Yuktanan)	1917–1922
4	Lueankea Sunanthakosar	1922–1924
5	Nua (Niwat) Kattrika	1924–1925
6	Borihansikkakit (่Jinda Sinthawanon)	1925–1928
7	Phuket Na Nakorn	1929–1931
8	Nua (Niwat) Kattrika	1931–1932
9	Anong Sukontharot	1933–1937
10	Pradap Na Thalang (Nongrat Punyanitya)	1937–1944
11	Yenchit Na Takuatung	1944–1978
12	Sawang Panman	1978–1987
13	Supang Khiahwan	1987–1992
14	Surang Bunhok	1992–1997
15	Rani Wisutthanawit	1998–2002
16	Phongsri Rueangdit	2002–2004
17	Kiattisak Pilawart	2004–2011
18	Pricha Nunoi	2011–present

== Curriculum ==
The curriculum consists of a nationwide and a local curriculum, with the former allocated 70% of the hours, and the latter 30%. The local curriculum is composed of community knowledge, local wisdom, and subjects related to the particular student body. The new central basic education curriculum began in 2009. The school has been selected to be a "lab" school to test the curriculum.

=== Programs ===
Majors

- Science – Math
- Arts – Math
- Arts – French
- Arts – German
- Arts – Chinese
- Arts – Japanese
- English Program (2003)
- Science and Math Program (2004)
- International English Program (2010)
- Super Science Program (2010)
- International Program Cambridge (2016)

Special programs

Satree Phuket School has initiated Special Programs to allow students who excel in certain subjects to take advantage of programs geared to develop student skills in those subjects. The school runs an English Program and a Science and Mathematics Program. The programs assisted in Thailand's Basic Education Commission selecting the school to participate in a new project called "Education Hub" which will make Satree Phuket School an education center for the Southern region. This new project began in 2010; its purpose is to be provide an international curriculum for Westerners living in Thailand who wish to send their children to school in Phuket.

== The Royal Awards for Schools ==
Satree Phuket School has received The Royal Awards for Schools at Elementary Level for 9 times since 1980. The award was given by H.M. The King Bhumibol Adulyadej.

No.	Years
1	1980
2	1982
3	1983
4	1984
5	1993
6	1997
7	2001
8	2005
9	2009
