= Rodrigo Reyes (director) =

Mexican film director

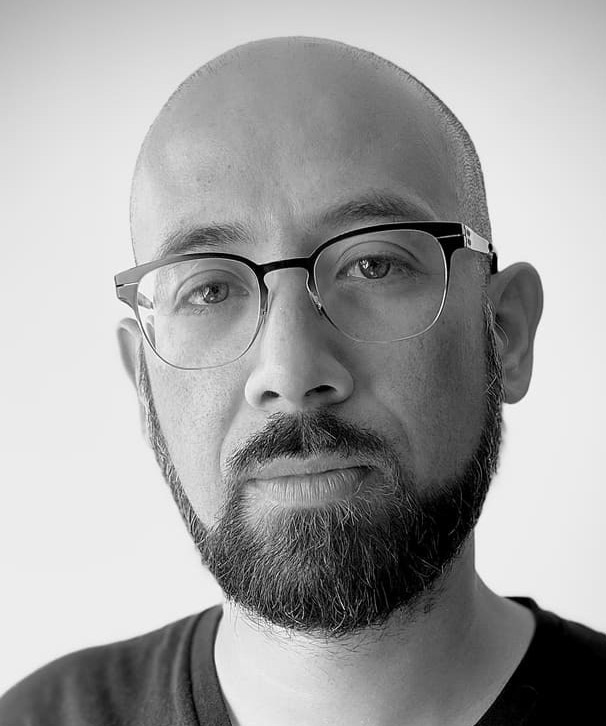
- Rodrigo Reyes, March 2021
- Born: July 22, 1983 (age 43); Mexico City, Mexico
- Citizenship: Mexico; United States
- Education: University of California, San Diego; Complutense University of Madrid; UNAM
- Occupation: Film director
- Years active: 2010-present
- Notable work: 499 (film)
- Website: http://www.rrcinema.com

Rodrigo Reyes (born July 22, 1983) is a Mexican film director residing in the United States. He is best known for the film 499, which had its premiere at the 2020 Tribeca Film Festival and Sansón and Me, winner of the Best Film Award at Sheffield DocFest.

== Career ==
Rodrigo Reyes is a Mexican-American award-winning film director, whose work has been screened around the world. His films explore the impact of systems of power on individuals, as well as legacies of violence alive today, and are usually set in the universe between Mexico and the United States.

Reyes directed several feature-length films, among them the neorealist Lupe Under the Sun, Purgatorio, and 499.

Rodrigo is the recipient of the Guggenheim Fellowship, Sundance Institute's Documentary Fund and Spotlight on Storytellers Award, the Kenneth Rainin Fellowship, the Creative Capital Award. He has been awarded funding by The Mexican Film Institute (IMCINE), as well as ITVS and Latino Public Broadcasting, and several grants from the Firelight Media, International Documentary Association, California Humanities, Bay Area Video Coalition and Tribeca Film Institute.

In 2013, Rodrigo was named by Filmmaker Magazine as one of the 25 New Faces of Independent Film. That same year, he premiered the feature-length documentary Purgatorio, screening at MoMA's Documentary Fortnight and winning the Cinema Tropical Award for Best US-Latino Film, as well as broadcasting on the documentary series America ReFramed.

In 2020, his film 499, won the Special Jury Award at Hot Docs, and received the Golden Frog award at Camerimage in docufiction.

His film Sansón and Me, chronicling Rodrigo's friendship with a Mexican immigrant serving life without parole in California, premiered at Tribeca in 2022, winning the top prize at Sheffield DocFest that same year. The Guardian review calls it "a startling and somber documentary," and the film was selected to open the 25th season of the award-winning documentary series Independent Lens.

== Themes and ideas ==
Rodrigo has written several essays reflecting on the art of filmmaking and the unique value of non-fiction cinema.

On entertainment in non-fiction

"...in the universe of non-fiction, filmmakers are often asked to provide the fascination of relief – a way of looking at the pain of the world through a lens of comfort and safety...Everything must feel palpably believable and authentic, because that is where the enjoyment lives. There’s not much room for invention in this premise.

This confusion of non-fiction filmmaking with entertainment has led to an approach to reality that ignores the essential truths of the world, many of which are tough, complicated and distressing, and demand new, vibrant points of view."

On Mentorship

"To be seen. Perhaps this is the true essence of mentorship? When someone looks at you, without weariness or cynicism, without calculation or profit-motives, simply dropping their guard and asking to walk by your side."

On filmmaking and memory

"Cinema is the art of remembering with light."

== Personal life ==
Rodrigo lives in the Bay Area. In 2006, he earned his B.A. in International Studies from University of California, San Diego. He has collaborated as a visiting professor with the Stanford University Documentary MFA program and was the co-director of the Mediamaker Fellowship with the Bay Area Video Coalition.
