= Even Benestad =

Norwegian documentary film director (born 1974)

Even Benestad (born 16 September 1974 in Grimstad Municipality) is a Norwegian documentary film director. Benestad studied cinematography at Oslo Film and Television Academy. His first feature-length documentary All About My Father (2002), which was winner of the "Best Film" award (fiction and non-fiction) at the Amanda Awards in 2002. He is a huge fan of Italian Spaghetti Westerns, and other Italian b-pictures.

== Filmography ==
- All About My Father (Alt om min far) (2002)
- Natural Born Star (2007)
- Tempus Fugit(short) (2008)
- Pushwagner (2011)
- 300 Seconds (series: episode, Ida's Diary) (2011)
- Club 7 (2014)
- ['three fathers'] Tre fedre (2025, documenatary film)
