= Mouawad =

Private jewelry company

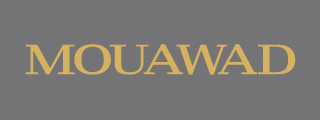
- Type: Private
- Industry: Retail
- Founded: 1890; 136 years ago
- Headquarters: Dubai, Geneva
- Key people: Robert Mouawad, Fred Mouawad, Alain Mouawad, Pascal Mouawad and Jimmy Mouawad
- Products: Jewelry, watches
- Number of employees: 500+ (2013)
- Website: www.mouawad.com

Mouawad is a family-owned international company of Lebanese origin that makes and sells jewelry, objects of art, and luxury watches. The firm has headquarters in Geneva, Switzerland, with a Middle East headquarters at Jumeirah Lakes Towers in Dubai, as well as locations in Thailand, Malaysia, Singapore, and the United States. Founded in 1891 in Beirut, Lebanon by David Mouawad, the firm is now led by 4th generation co-guardians Fred Mouawad, Alain Mouawad and Pascal Mouawad.

== History ==
=== First generation ===
The Mouawad Company and brand began with David Mouawad (1865–1951) who spent more than two decades in New York City and Mexico learning under watchmakers, goldsmiths, and jewelers before returning to Beirut in 1891. He opened a small shop in Beirut in 1908 where he combined the trade of watch and jewelry repairs, with his passion for creating intricate clocks and fashioning one-of-a-kind pieces commissioned by wealthy clients.

=== Second generation ===
His son Fayez Mouawad (1917–1990) expanded the business in the 1950s when he moved to Saudi Arabia. He capitalized on the Middle East's increased oil wealth by making personalized jewelry for people in the area.

=== Third generation ===
The firm moved into the European and worldwide market under Fayez's son, Robert Mouawad. He had initially studied in Europe to become a doctor, but returned after being convinced by his father to join the family business. He started as a salesman with Mouawad in order to learn the business from the ground up, later entering into an agreement with his father to take over the business as the sole president. In the early 1970s, Robert moved the headquarters to Geneva, Switzerland.

He took many risks with the firm by purchasing some of the world's largest diamonds. He expanded the brand into Europe, Asia, and North America and began producing watches in the early 1990s. He's also contributed to jewelry education and research through support of the Gemological Institute of America whose campus in Carlsbad, California is named in his honor.

=== Fourth generation ===
In 2010, Robert Mouawad left the firm to focus on his real estate group, the Robert Mouawad Foundation, and his museum. He officially retired on January 1, 2010, and the company was then led by his sons Fred Mouawad and Pascal Mouawad. Alain Mouawad joined to head up the watch division in January 2013.

Generations of the Mouawad Family
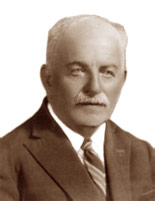
David Mouawad

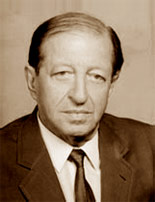
Fayez Mouawad

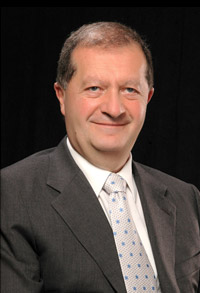
Robert Mouawad

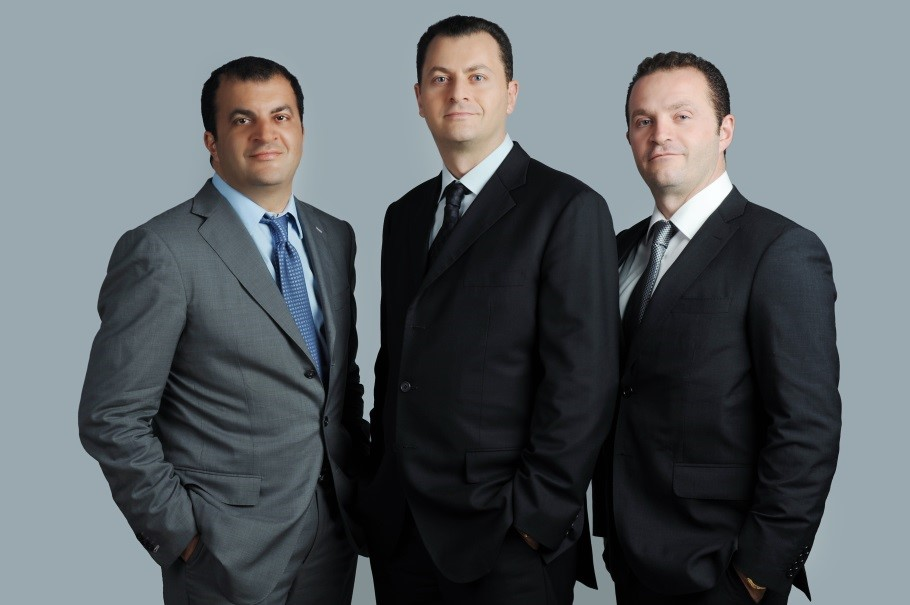
Alain, Fred & Pascal Mouawad

=== Diamond collection ===
The Ahmedabad diamond

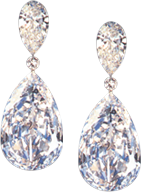
Indore Pears diamonds

The Mouawad Liliac diamond

Diamonds owned by the Mouawad family include the Ahmedabad which is a pear shaped diamond that weighs 78.86 carats with a D-VS1 Grade.

Mouawad is the owner of the Indore Pears which are linked to the Malabar Hill Murder. In January 1925, armed men attacked a car in Bombay which was being driven by an official of the Bombay Corporation. The passenger in the vehicle was a young Muslim woman who was the subject of the attack. The official was killed and four British officers came to the aid of the woman. Robbery was not the motive for this crime as the young woman was believed to be a dancer at the Court of Tukoji Rao III. The woman escaped from being a concubine and the murder was believed to be retaliation. The diamonds were purchased several times throughout the years until they were purchased by Robert Mouawad in 1987.

The Queen of Holland diamond (it:Regina d'Olanda) is another in the Mouawad collection. Its origin is unknown; however, it was believed to have been brought from South Africa to the Netherlands. It was first cut in 1904 by F. Freidman & Co. who made it a cushion-cut and named it after Queen Wihelmina of the Netherlands, which is incorrectly referred to as Holland. The diamond was re-cut sometime after the 1960s into its current weight of 135.92 carats. It is judged to be internally flawless and 'D' color by the Gemological Institute of America. This diamond was also formerly owned by William Goldberg.

Mouawad is the owner of the Jubilee Diamond, a colourless, cushion-shaped diamond weighing 245.35 carats (49.07 grams) and formerly known as the Reitz Diamond. It is the sixth-largest diamond in the world and originally named after Francis William Reitz who was the president of the Orange Free State at the time the diamond was discovered in the area. The Jubilee is the largest diamond in the Mouawad collection.

The Mouawad Lilac is estimated to be worth $20M (USD) and weighs 24.44 carat. It is an emerald cut pink diamond that is so saturated with color that it gives off a purplish, almost maroon, hue.

== Guinness World Records ==
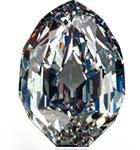
The Mouawad Splendor diamond

Mouawad has five Guinness World Records: The most valuable jewellery coffer in the world — the Flower of Eternity Jewellery Coffer ($3.5M), the most valuable necklace in the world ($55M) — the Mouawad L’Incomparable Diamond Necklace featuring the world's largest internally flawless diamond, the Incomparable diamond (407.48 carats). The most valuable handbag in the world—the Mouawad 1001 Nights Diamond Purse ($3.8M).
