= Miss Universe Thailand 2020 =

21st Miss Universe Thailand pageant

- Date: 10 October 2020
- Presenters: Piyawat Kempetch; Risa Honghiran
- Entertainment: Da Endorphine; Miriam Sornprommas; Vachirawit Chiva-aree; Metawin Opas-iamkajorn
- Venue: True Icon Hall, Bangkok, Thailand
- Broadcaster: PPTV 36
- Entrants: 29
- Placements: 20
- Winner: Amanda Obdam; Phuket

Miss Universe Thailand 2020 was the 21st edition of the Miss Universe Thailand pageant, held on 10 October 2020 at the True Icon Hall of Iconsiam. Amanda Obdam was crowned by the previous winner Paweensuda Drouin. Obdam represented Thailand at Miss Universe 2020 and finished as a top 10 semifinalist.

== Results ==
=== Placements ===
Placement	Contestant
Miss Universe Thailand 2020	MUT97 Phuket – Amanda Obdam
1st Runner-Up	MUT08 Chiang Mai – Praveenar Singh §
2nd Runner-Up	MUT18 Prachuap Khiri Khan – Punika Kulsoontornrut
3rd Runner-Up	MUT56 Chumphon – Praewwanich Ruangthong
4th Runner-Up	MUT91 Chiang Mai – Alexandra Hänggi
Top 10	MUT01 Phuket – Benjarat Akkarawanichsil Aebi; MUT26 Chiang Mai – Emmy Sawyer; MUT33 Bangkok – Patitta Suntivijj; MUT79 Phetchaburi – Thaweeporn Phingchamrat; MUT96 Bangkok – Chanakarn Suksatit
Top 20	MUT05 Nakhon Pathom – Natthapat Pongpraphan; MUT06 Bangkok – Arisara Purechatang; MUT30 Bangkok – Pornpreeya Jumnongbut; MUT38 Bangkok – Nuttha Thongkaew; MUT43 Chiang Mai – Wanvisa Maya Goldman; MUT45 Bangkok – Radamanee Kanjanarat; MUT49 Chumphon – Jareerat Petsom; MUT50 Saraburi – Sirilux Songsri; MUT52 Sukhothai – Thidapon Ketthong; MUT77 Khon Kaen – Wichuda Kamyos

§ – Voted into the Top 10 by viewers online.

== Contestants ==
29 contestants competed for the title of Miss Universe Thailand 2020.

No.	Name	Age (Note: Ages at the time of the pageant)	Height	Province	Placement
1	Benjarat Akkarawanichsil Aebi	26	172 cm (5 ft 7 1/2 in)	Phuket	Top 10
5	Natthapat Pongprapan	26	170 cm (5 ft 7 in)	Nakhon Pathom	Top 20
6	Arisara Purechatang	21	172 cm (5 ft 7 1/2 in)	Bangkok	Top 20
8	Praveenar Singh	24	178 cm (5 ft 10 in)	Chiang Mai	1st Runner-Up
9	Piyathida Phothong	20	173 cm (5 ft 8 in)	Surat Thani	
18	Punika Kulsoontornrut	28	175 cm (5 ft 9 in)	Prachuap Khiri Khan	2nd Runner-Up
26	Emmy Sawyer	19	173 cm (5 ft 8 in)	Chiang Mai	Top 10
27	Manatsawee Nilbuala	20	176 cm (5 ft 9 1/2 in)	Nakhon Ratchasima	
30	Pornpreeya Jumnongbut	26	167 cm (5 ft 5 1/2 in)	Bangkok	Top 20
33	Patitta Suntivijj	26	168 cm (5 ft 6 in)	Bangkok	Top 10
38	Nuttha Thongkaew	27	168 cm (5 ft 6 in)	Bangkok	Top 20
43	Wanvisa Maya Goldman	26	170 cm (5 ft 7 in)	Chiang Mai	Top 20
45	Radamanee Kanjanarat	24	170 cm (5 ft 7 in)	Bangkok	Top 20
49	Jareerat Petsom	27	168 cm (5 ft 6 in)	Chumphon	Top 20
50	Sirilux Songsri	24	170 cm (5 ft 7 in)	Saraburi	Top 20
52	Thidapon Ketthong	26	172 cm (5 ft 7 1/2 in)	Sukhothai	Top 20
56	Praewwanich Ruangthong	28	172 cm (5 ft 7 1/2 in)	Chumphon	3rd Runner-Up
59	Pimnada Kittivisarnvong	26	172 cm (5 ft 7 1/2 in)	Bangkok	
61	Pathinya Triwiwatkul	23	173 cm (5 ft 8 in)	Bangkok	
62	Kanyanut Numnaree	27	176 cm (5 ft 9 1/2 in)	Ratchaburi	
64	Chutikarn Suwannakote	21	170 cm (5 ft 7 in)	Nonthaburi	
71	Praewatchara Schmid	27	170 cm (5 ft 7 in)	Bangkok	
77	Wichuda Kamyos	22	175 cm (5 ft 9 in)	Khon Kaen	Top 20
79	Thaweeporn Phingchamrat	24	170 cm (5 ft 7 in)	Phetchaburi	Top 10
88	Areeya Sinlapanawa	25	170 cm (5 ft 7 in)	Bangkok	
91	Alexandra Hänggi	21	172 cm (5 ft 7 1/2 in)	Chiang Mai	4th Runner-Up
92	Baralee Ruamrak	21	170 cm (5 ft 7 in)	Ubon Ratchathani	
96	Chanakarn Suksatit	26	174 cm (5 ft 8 1/2 in)	Bangkok	Top 10
97	Amanda Obdam	27	170 cm (5 ft 7 in)	Phuket	Miss Universe Thailand 2020
