= Marciano Art Foundation =

Contemporary art space Los Angeles, CA

- Abbreviation: MAF
- Type: Contemporary art space
- Purpose: Exhibition of Marciano Collection dating from the 1990's to the present day
- Services: Free and open to the public. Guided K-12 school tours. Reserve tickets and tours in advance.
- Website: https://marcianoartfoundation.org/

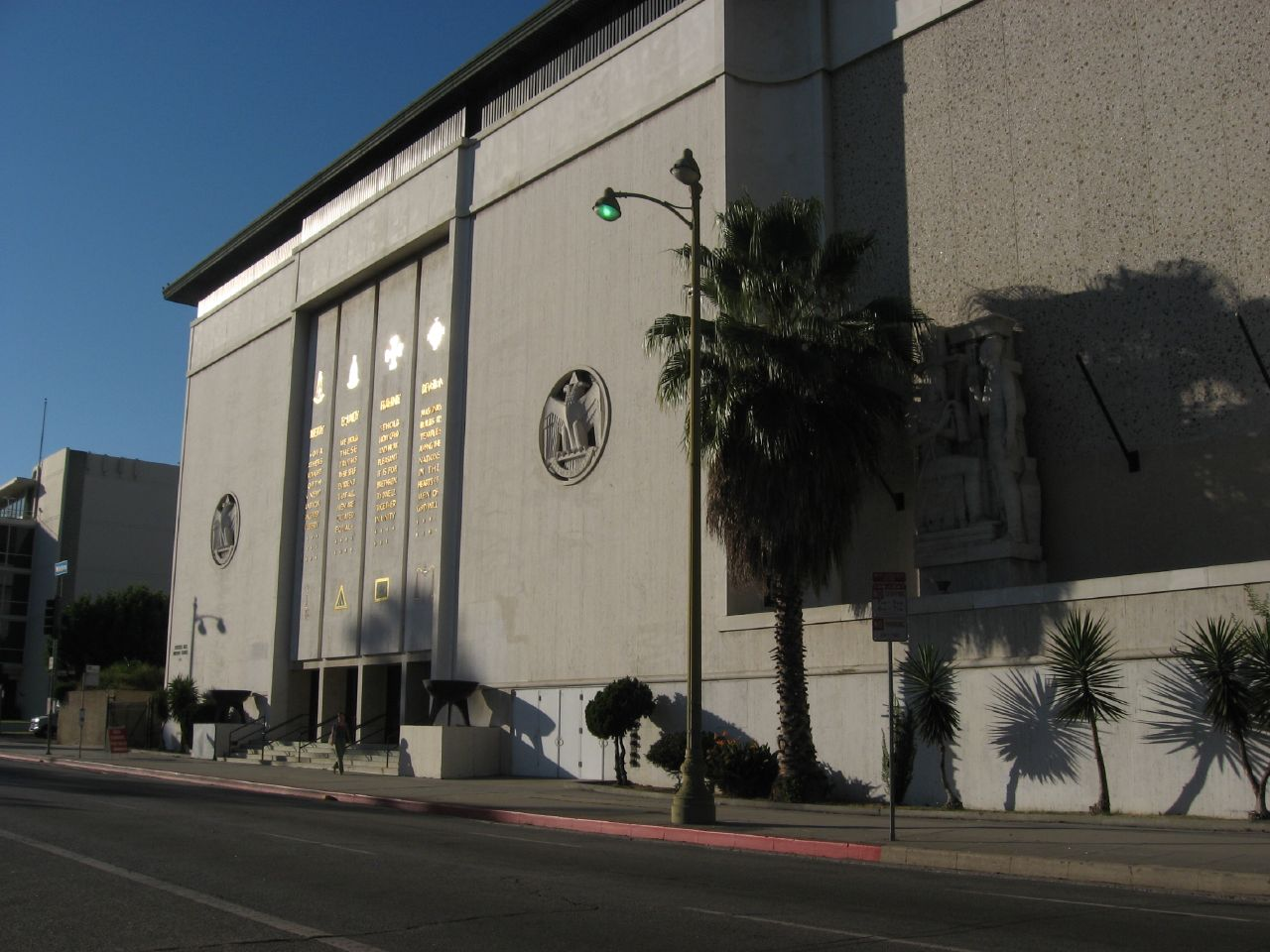
Scottish Rite Masonic Temple in Los Angeles, California was purchased by The Maurice and Paul Marciano Art Foundation in July 2013. It opened as a contemporary art museum from 2017.

The Marciano Art Foundation (formally named the Maurice and Paul Marciano Art Foundation) is a non-profit arts foundation located on Wilshire Boulevard in the Mid-Wilshire neighborhood of Los Angeles, California. It was established by the co-founders of Guess, Maurice Marciano and Paul Marciano. The Marcianos opened the museum on May 25, 2017 as an exhibition space to display their 1,500-piece collection of contemporary art. The museum closed indefinitely in November 2019 after workers attempted to unionize. The Marciano Foundation released a statement a month later that the closure was permanent. The museum reopened to the public, and it is free. Visitors must reserve timed-entry tickets in advance.

== History ==
Following a recommendation by artist Alex Israel in 2013, the Marciano Art Foundation paid $8 million to buy the former Scottish Rite Masonic Temple on Wilshire Boulevard. The building was converted into an exhibition space by contemporary architect Kulapat Yantrasast of Why Architecture and Design. With 110,000 square feet (10,000 m^{2}) over four floors, it was as large as the Museum of Contemporary Art, Los Angeles and The Broad. A 5,000-square-foot (460 m^{2}) sculpture garden by the entrance featured works by Oscar Tuazon, Danh Vō and Thomas Houseago, among others.

In order to avoid any conflicts of interest with Maurice Marciano's subsequent co-chairmanship of MOCA, the project was temporarily put on hold. The museum’s inaugural show, Unpacking: The Marciano Art Foundation, was organized by guest curator Philipp Kaiser.

== Collection ==
About 90 percent of the Marciano Art Foundation’s collection has been amassed since 2010. Today, the foundation owns works by Yael Bartana, Wade Guyton, Glenn Ligon, Alex Israel, Albert Oehlen, Mai-Thu Perret, Seth Price, Sterling Ruby, Barbara Kruger, Mimi Lauter, KAWS, Charles Ray, Mike Kelley, Jonas Wood, Paul Sietsema, Rudolf Stingel, Kaari Upson, Adrián Villar Rojas, and Christopher Wool, among others.
