= Robinsons Dumaguete =

Shopping mall in Negros Oriental, Philippines

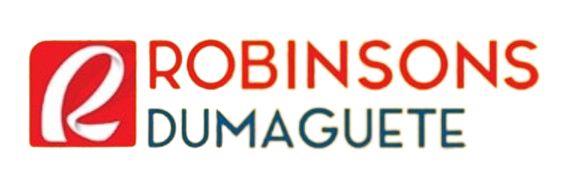

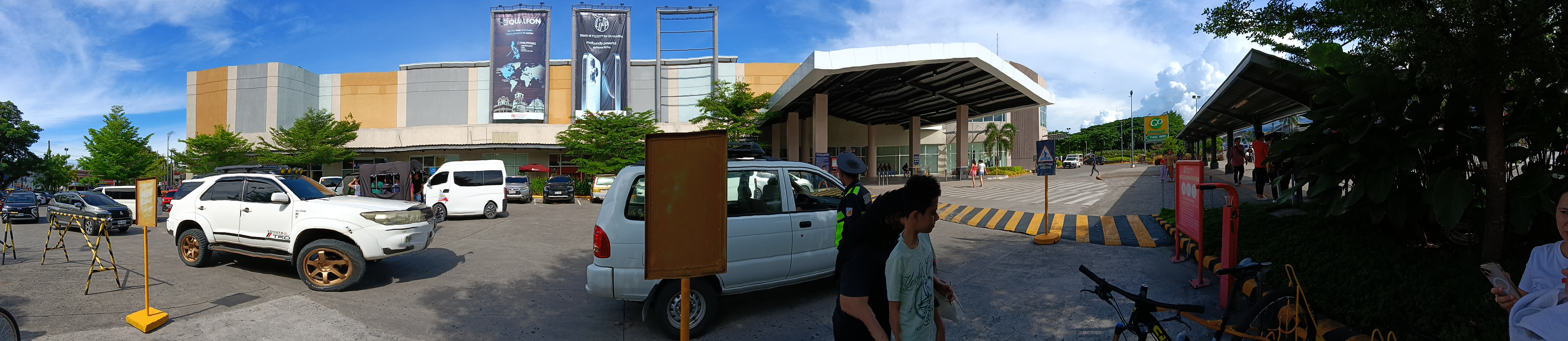
- Robinsons Dumaguete in 2025.
- Location: Calindagan, Dumaguete, Philippines
- Coordinates: 9°17′54.57″N 123°18′12.17″E
- Opened: November 23, 2009; 16 years ago
- Developer: Robinsons Land Corporation
- Manager: Robinsons Malls
- Owner: John Gokongwei
- Num. of stores: 150+
- Num. of anchor tenants: 7
- Floor area: 80,000 m^{2} (860,000 sq ft)
- Floors: Main Mall - 2 floors Expansion Tower - 7 floors (1st-4th floors Mall Extension and 5th-7th floors Cybergate Center 1)
- Website: www.robinsonsmalls.com/mall-info/robinsons-place-dumaguete

Robinsons Dumaguete (formerly known as Robinsons Place Dumaguete), is a shopping mall located in Dumaguete, Philippines. It has a total gross floor area of over 80,000 m^{2} (860,000 sq ft) and is located on almost 60,000 m^{2} (650,000 sq ft) of land area. It is the first and largest full-service shopping mall in Negros Oriental and is a major component of the Dumaguete Business Park and IT Plaza in Brgy. Calindagan. It features an activity center, two atria, and an al fresco dining area (main mall); new mall expansion houses the VIP Cinema, the very first entertainment facility in Dumaguete City, and wellness zones while the new Eat Street food court and Our Lady of Peace and Good Voyage chapel both at the 4th level. The mall contains outlet store brands such as Uniqlo, GUESS, Bench, Adidas, Anta Sports, Daiso Japan, Dumaguete famous Sans Rival shop, Hukad by Golden Cowrie, KFC, Shakey's, National Book Store, Timezone and iStore among others.

Located in its vicinity is Go Hotels Dumaguete, a hotel chain also owned by Robinsons Land Corporation (RLC), and a public transport terminal which serves the commuting public coming from north and south of Dumaguete and the rest of Negros Oriental, as well as those from the neighboring provinces of Cebu, Siquijor, and some areas in Mindanao.

== History ==
Robinsons Dumaguete Logo used from its opening in 2009 until the logo's unification with other Robinsons Malls

Robinsons Dumaguete opened on November 23, 2009, making it the 27th shopping mall development of Robinsons Malls, a division under Robinsons Land Corporation. It was constructed by Freyssinet Philippines, Inc. and is RLC's sixth mall development in the Visayas, and second in Negros Island after Robinsons Bacolod.

The mall has been awarded by the Philippine Retailers Association (PRA) as the Mall of the Year for 2012.

In October 2015, the Department of Foreign Affairs opened a passport office at the mall's second level. RPD launched the Lingkod Pinoy Center wherein some government agencies have put up offices inside the mall such as Professional Regulation Commission, SSS, Philhealth, LTO, PhilPost, Bureau of Quarantine and PSA.

The seven floors Robinsons Dumaguete expansion is completed on September 2026 with first four floors that connects to a 4-storey parking building and the public terminal for its mall/retail expansion. Meanwhile, the Robinsons Cybergate 1 houses a business process outsourcing companies is on the 5th-7th floors.

== See also ==
- Robinsons Malls
- Dumaguete
- List of shopping malls in the Philippines
