= Maurice Marciano =

Co-founder of GUESS

Maurice Marciano is an American businessperson, art collector and art museum founder. He is a co-founder of the Guess clothing company. He is a co-founder of the Marciano Art Foundation, a contemporary art museum in Los Angeles.

He was also chair of the board of the Museum of Contemporary Art, Los Angeles in the 2010s.

Marciano retired from the Guess board of directors in 2023.
