= Mareva =

Mareva may refer to:

- Mareva injunction, a court order to freeze assets
- Mareva Galanter (born 1979), French singer, actress, and Miss France 1999
- Mareva Georges (born 1969), French model and Miss France 1991
- Mareva Grabowski-Mitsotakis (born 1967), Greek business executive
- Alana Mareva, fictional character in The 4400
- Mareva, a factory name or vitola de galera for the classical Cuban cigar size Petit Corona
