= Scottish Rite Masonic Temple (Los Angeles) =

Building in Los Angeles, California, United States

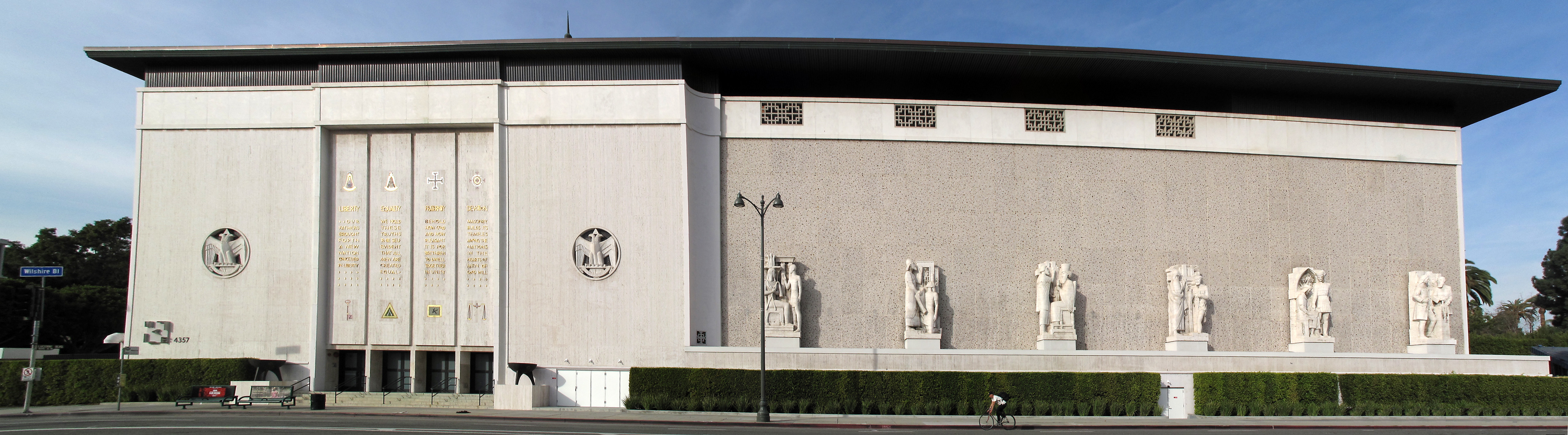

- Location within the Los Angeles metropolitan area

General information
- Location: Wilshire Boulevard, Los Angeles, California, United States
- Coordinates: 34.062167°N 118.323534°W
- Completed: 1961

Design and construction
- Architect: Millard Sheets

The Scottish Rite Masonic Temple in Los Angeles, California, United States is a monumental building on Wilshire Boulevard which was completed in 1961. It was designed by Millard Sheets.

The building was purchased by The Maurice and Paul Marciano Art Foundation in July 2013. It was opened as a contemporary art museum from 2017 to 2019.

It was associated with the Scottish Rite order within Freemasonry.

== Gallery ==
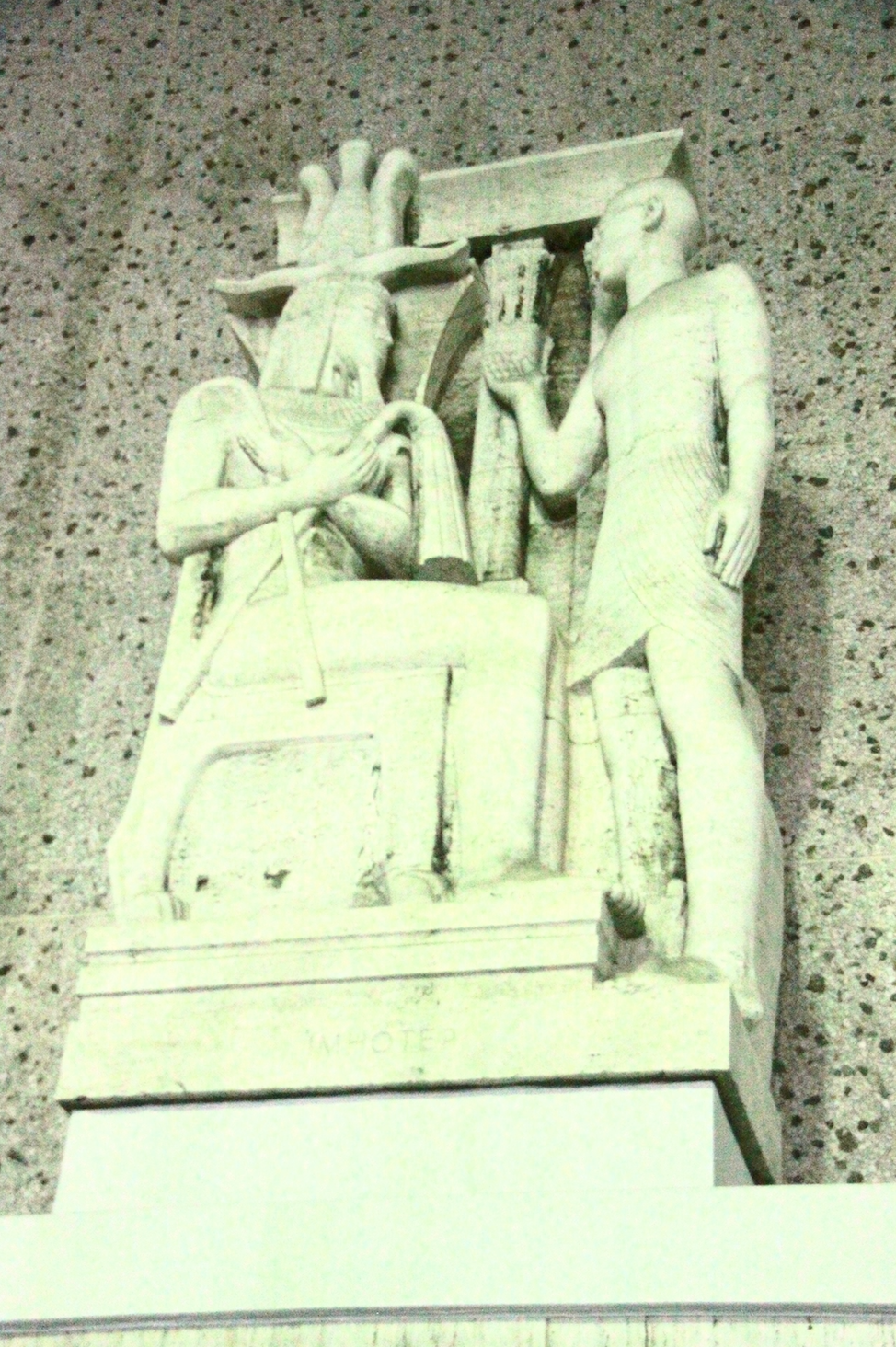
A look at the temple's stonework along Wilshire Blvd.

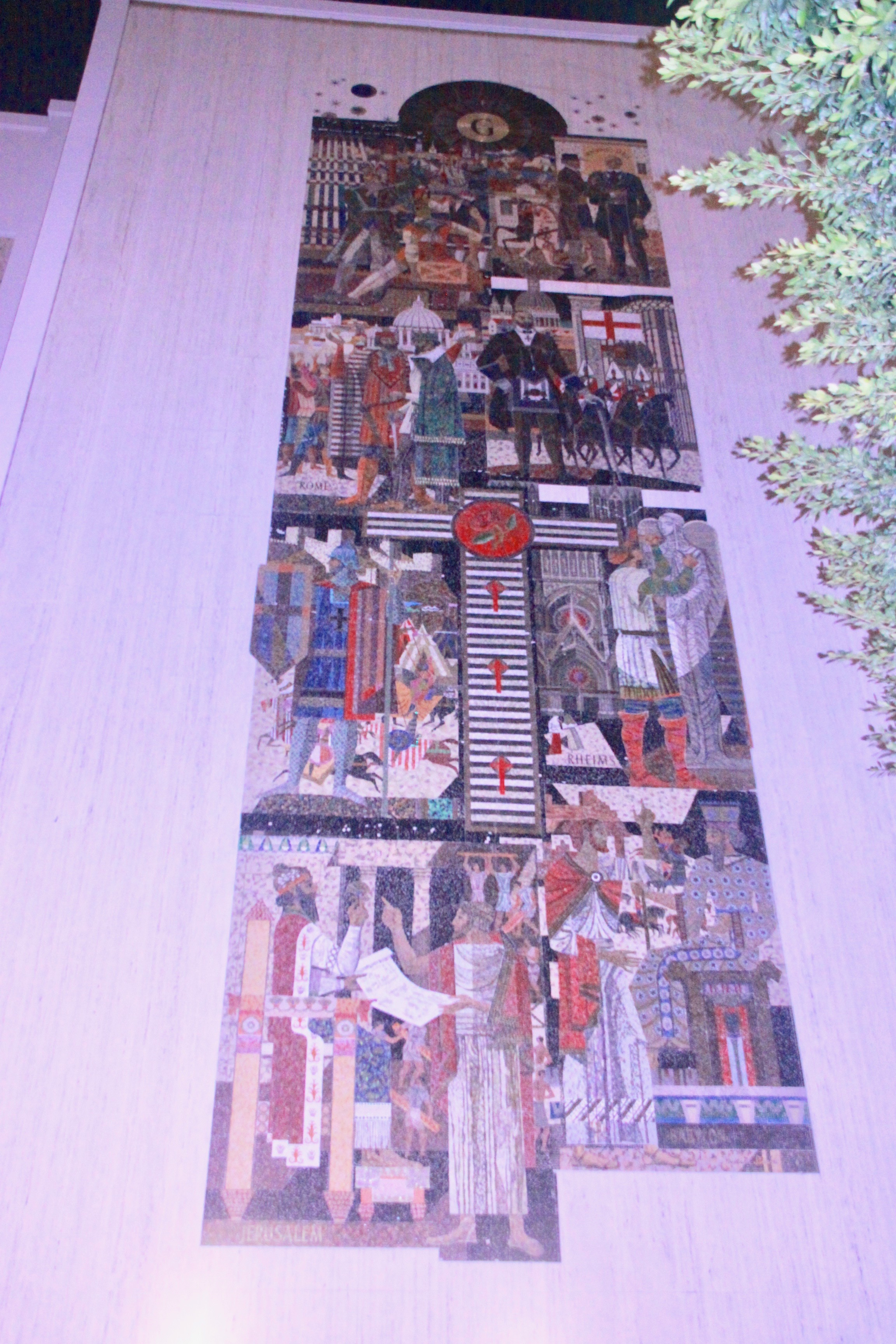
A Millard Sheets mosaic embellishes the east side of the building.

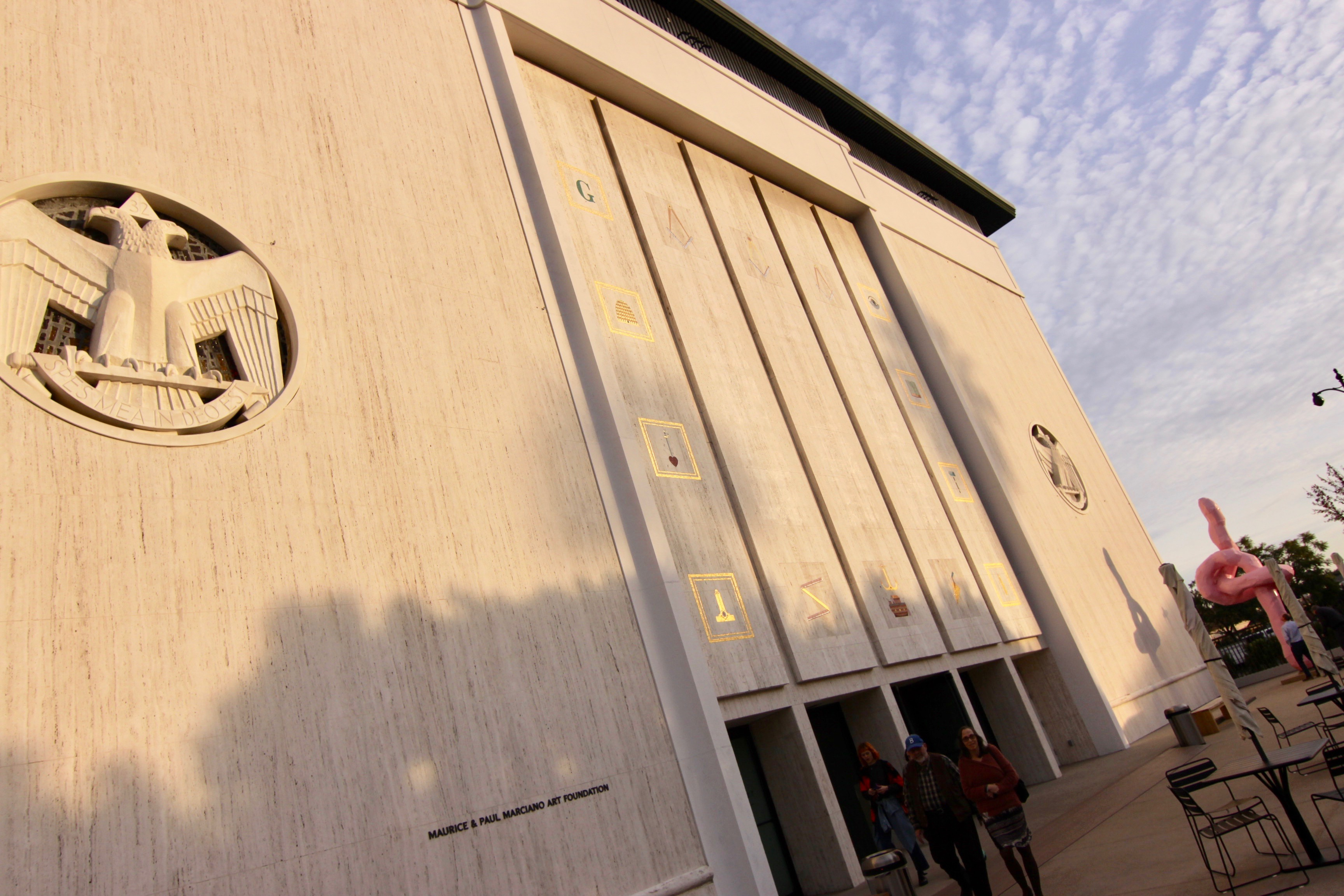
Entrance to the building when it was the Marciano Arts Foundation.

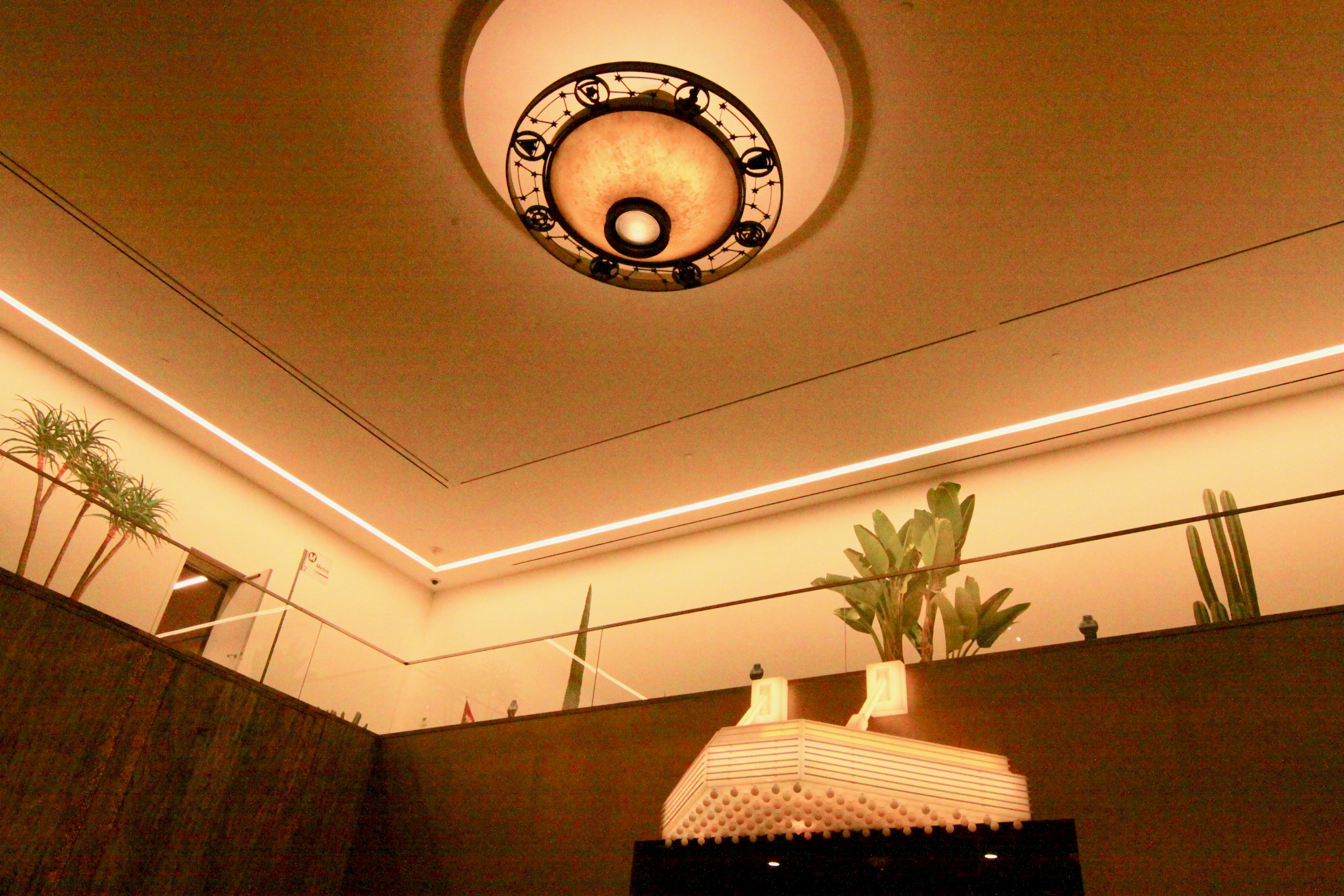
A look at the temple lobby when it was used for the Marciano Arts Foundation.
