= Mareva Georges =

French model (born 1969)

- Born: 29 May 1969 (age 56); French Polynesia, France
- Occupations: Model; Women's and children's advocate
- Known for: Miss Tahiti 1990; Miss France 1991
- Spouse: Paul Marciano
- Children: 2

Mareva Marciano (née Georges; born 29 May 1969) is a French model and beauty pageant titleholder who was crowned Miss France 1991. She had previously won Miss Tahiti 1990 and later placed in the Top 10 at both Miss Universe 1991 and Miss World 1991.

== Early life ==
Georges's father is German and her mother is of Tahitian, Rarotongan, and American descent. She is a relative of two other Miss Tahiti and Miss France winners: her aunt is Edna Tepava, who was Miss Tahiti 1973 and Miss France 1974, while her cousin is Vaimalama Chaves, who was Miss Tahiti 2018 and Miss France 2019. Georges was raised in Punaauia and began her career as a model. She won the Miss Tahiti pageant in 1990 which qualified her to run for Miss France which she won in 1991.

She studied in Aix-en-Provence in Southern France.

== Personal life ==
In 2016, she married Guess? Inc. co-founder Paul Marciano in Bora Bora. They have two children, Ryan (born 2006) and Gia (born 2012). The couple lives in Los Angeles.

== Advocacy ==
Today she works as an advocate for the protection of children and women from abuse. In 2016 she donated over $20,000 to Republican candidates including a donation of $2,700 (the maximum amount allowed by federal law) to Donald Trump.

Preceded by Myriam Tuheiava	Miss Tahiti; 1990	Succeeded by Hina Sarciaux
Preceded by Gaëlle Voiry	Miss France; 1991	Succeeded by Linda Hardy
