= Paul Marciano =

Moroccan-Jewish-American fashion designer (born 1952)

- Born: September 1, 1952 (age 74); Debdou, French Morocco
- Occupations: Fashion designer, businessman, investor, philanthropist
- Known for: Co-founder of Guess? Inc.
- Spouse(s): Kymberly Marciano (divorced); Mareva Georges
- Children: 4

Paul Marciano (born September 1, 1952) is a Moroccan-American-French fashion designer, businessman, investor, and philanthropist. He is the co-founder of Guess? Inc; his black-and-white advertisements have won numerous Clio awards. Initially run by all four Marciano brothers (Paul, Armand, Maurice and Georges), today the company and its extension lines, Marciano and G by Guess, are handled by Paul and Maurice. He is also a large benefactor to one of the larger Sephardic synagogues in Los Angeles, Em Habanim.

== Early life ==
Paul Marciano was born on September 1, 1952 in Debdou, Morocco to a Jewish family of Italian-Jewish descent, from the region of Campania, specifically from the areas around Naples. He was raised in Marseille, France with his four siblings, Georges, Armand, Maurice and Jacqueline. His father, grandfather, and great-grandfather were rabbis. They lived in an apartment in a synagogue complex. From ages 8–15, Paul, along with his brothers, was a member of the Éclaireurs israelites de France, a Jewish boy scout group which was located in the same complex. At 15, he and a friend were involved in a motorcycle accident when they collided with an oncoming car. After being told he would never walk again, he spent seven months in a wheelchair. He eventually regained full use of his limbs after a year and a half, but was not re-accepted into school due to his prolonged absence. Unable to finish his education, he traveled to Israel to live on a kibbutz.

== Career ==
=== MGA ===
Marciano worked in his family's clothing company, MGA (which stood for Maurice Georges Armand), with shops in French Riviera. The Marciano brothers, Paul, Georges, Armand, and Maurice, visited Southern California during an extended leave in 1977, and developed an appreciation for the area. After political changes in France in 1981 and the rise to power of socialist François Mitterrand, the Marcianos closed MGA and moved to the United States. They also ran an MGA on Little Santa Monica in Beverly Hills in the early 1980s. The brothers soon started the world-famous clothing company Guess.

=== Guess? Inc. ===
In 1981, the Marciano brothers founded Guess Jeans. In 1983, they sold a 50% stake in Guess Jeans to the Nakash Brothers (Joseph "Joe" Nakash, Abraham "Avi" Nakash, and Raphael "Ralph" Nakash) of New York. The joint venture soured and in 1989, a California superior court jury found that the Nakashes had fraudulently lured the Marcianos into the transaction. In 1990, the Nakash brothers settled for $66 million of $106 million escrowed profits and the ownership of the brand name "Gasoline" while the Marciano brothers received the brand "Diesel." Paul Marciano first handled advertising and public relations and later became president and chief operating officer of the company in 1993. In 2004, Paul and Maurice Marciano together owned close to 70 percent of the 44 million shares.

In June 2018, Paul Marciano stepped down as the CEO of Guess following allegations of sexual assault by Kate Upton and four other women which were settled for $500,000. Marciano had previously been accused of sexual harassment in 2008 and 2009, after model Lindsay Ring filed a suit that stated Marciano "began to create a hostile work environment for Ms. Ring by making sexual comments to her, repeatedly touching her inappropriately and without her consent, and attempting on at least two occasions to fondle her sexually after taking her to a private area at the worksite." He became Executive Chairman and remained Guess' chief creative officer.

=== Other business activities ===
Along with his brother Maurice, Paul Marciano joined forces in 2013 with Steve Tisch and World Wrestling Entertainment in backing Hero Ventures, a Los Angeles entertainment start-up.

== Philanthropy ==
In 2013, the Maurice and Paul Marciano Art Foundation paid $8 million to buy the former Scottish Rite Masonic Temple in Los Angeles, on Wilshire Boulevard, which the two brothers turned into a private museum, designed by architect Kulapat Yantrasast to house their more-than-1,500-piece contemporary art collection. With 90,000 square feet (8,400 m^{2}) over four floors, the interior space is almost as large as the Museum of Contemporary Art, Los Angeles. In order to avoid any conflicts of interest with Maurice Marciano's subsequent co-chairmanship of MOCA, the project was temporarily put on hold. Finally, the museum opened in 2017. But the staff later attempted to unionize, and, on November 1, 2019, a petition, representing about 70 of the museum's employees, including many in visitor-services roles, was filed with the National Labor Relations Board (NLRB), seeking a raise from California minimum wage. Just a few days later, on November 7, all of the visitor services associates were laid off, and the museum was closed indefinitely. It is now possible to visit the foundation for free, but by reservation, or appointment, only.

In 2014, Paul and his brother Maurice donated $5.2 million to the Friends of the Israel Defense Forces.

== Politics ==
Prior to 2016, Marciano donated primarily to Democratic political candidates. But since 2016, he stopped supporting Democrats and made over $20,000 in donations to Republican candidates, including $2,700 (the maximum allowed by law) to Donald Trump.

== Personal life ==
Marciano has been married twice. His first wife was model and photographer Kymberly Marciano; they had two children Nicolai (born 1996) and Ella (born 1994) before divorcing. In 2016, he married French model, Mareva Georges, Miss Tahiti 1990 and Miss France 1991, in Bora Bora, France. They have two children, Ryan (born 2005) and Gia (born 2012) and live in Los Angeles. Georges works as an advocate for the protection of children and women from abuse.

== Sexual Misconduct Allegations ==
A 2021 lawsuit alleged that Marciano had sexually abused, harassed, and assaulted women who worked as Guess models since the 1990s. Dozens of women, including Kate Upton, came forward with their experiences being raped and sexually assaulted by Marciano. The derivative suit, filed against Guess by its shareholders, settled for $30 million.

== See also ==
- List of fashion designers

== Bibliography ==
- Shora, Nawar (2008). Arab-American Handbook. Seattle: Cune Press. ISBN 978-188-594-214-2.
