= Banica River =

River in Negros Oriental, Philippines

- Banica River mouth Banica River (Philippines)

Location
- Country: Philippines
- Region: Negros Island Region
- Province: Negros Oriental
- City/municipality: Valencia; Dumaguete

Physical characteristics
- Source: Mountains above Valencia, near Casaroro Falls
  - location: Valencia, Negros Oriental
- Mouth: Bohol Sea
  - location: Dumaguete
  - coordinates: 9°18′05″N 123°18′41″E
  - elevation: 0 m (0 ft)
- Length: 23 km (14 mi)
- Basin size: 1,456 km^{2} (562 sq mi)
- Discharge
  - location: Dumaguete

The Banica River is a river on the island of Negros in the Philippines, in the municipality of Valencia and Dumaguete City.

It flows south of the Okoy River in Negros Oriental, but is not a tributary of it. This is a common misunderstanding, but it can be easily verified on Google Maps that the two rivers (Banica and Okoy) are completely separate – the Banica flows wholly south of the Okoy.

The source of the Banica River lies in the mountains above Valencia, and one of its tributaries flows through the famous Casaroro Falls.

The river traverses the municipality of Valencia and the city of Dumaguete where it empties into the Bohol Sea.
