= Dumaguete =

Capital city of Negros Oriental, Philippines

- Component city
- City of Dumaguete
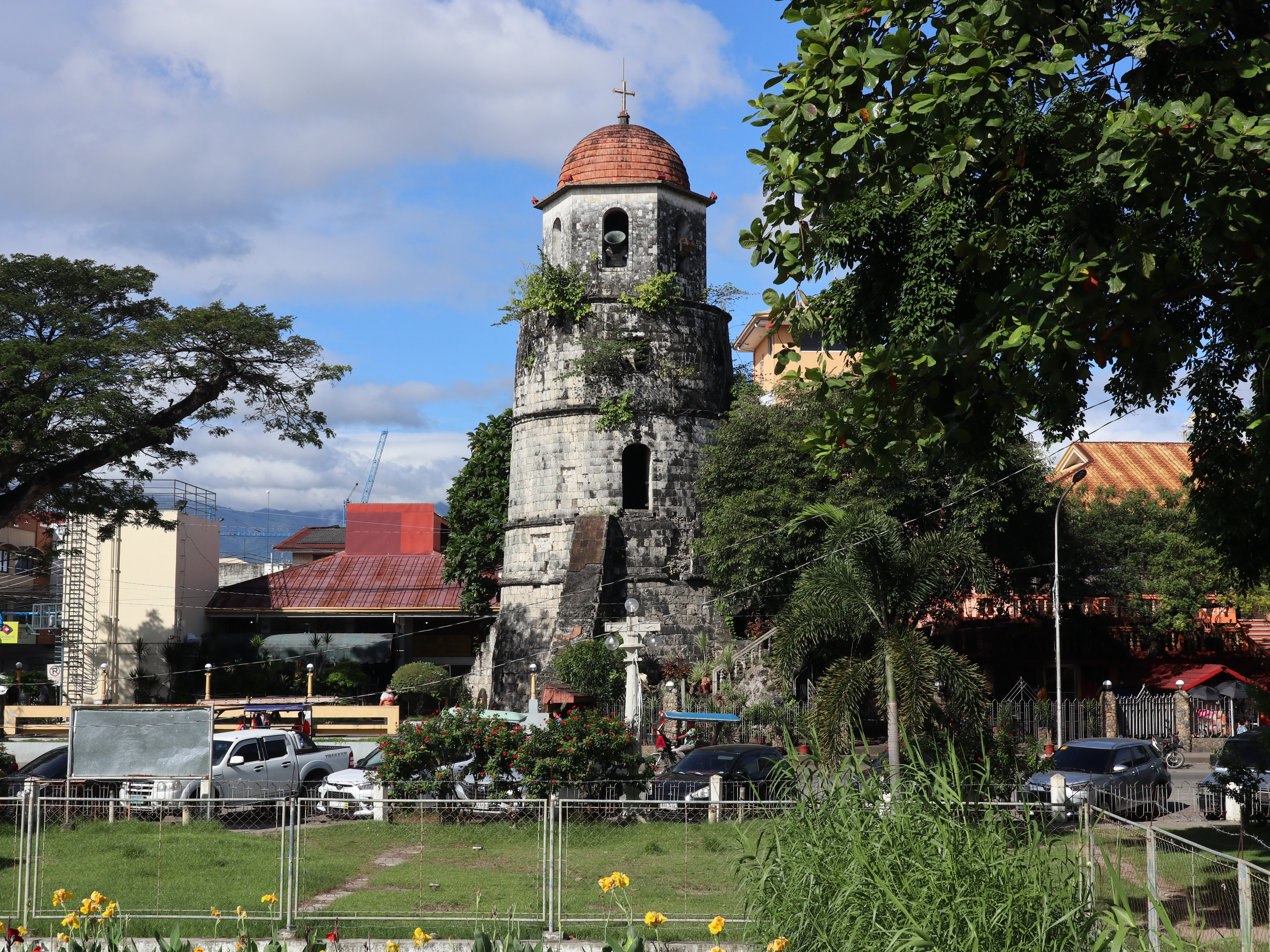
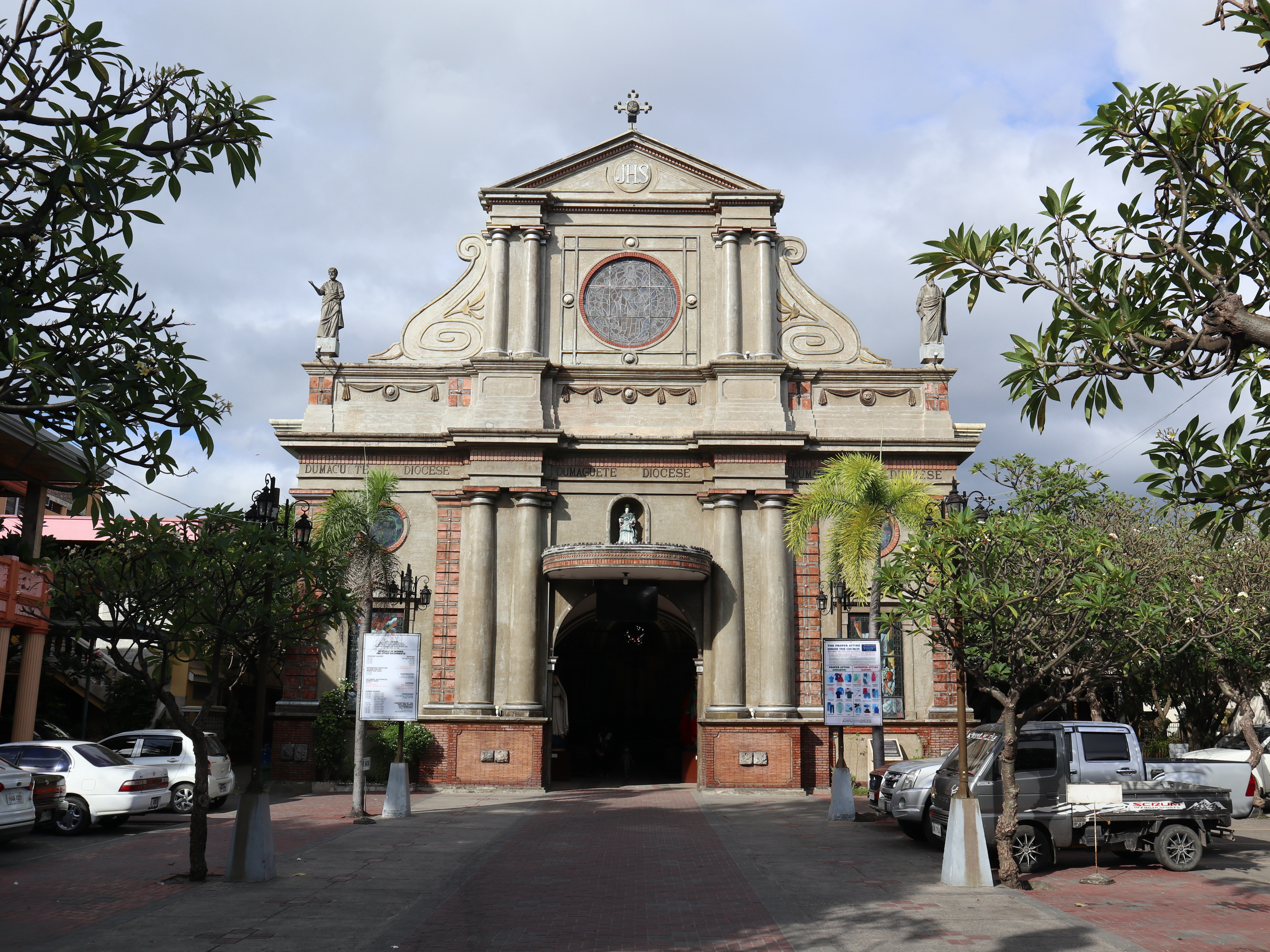
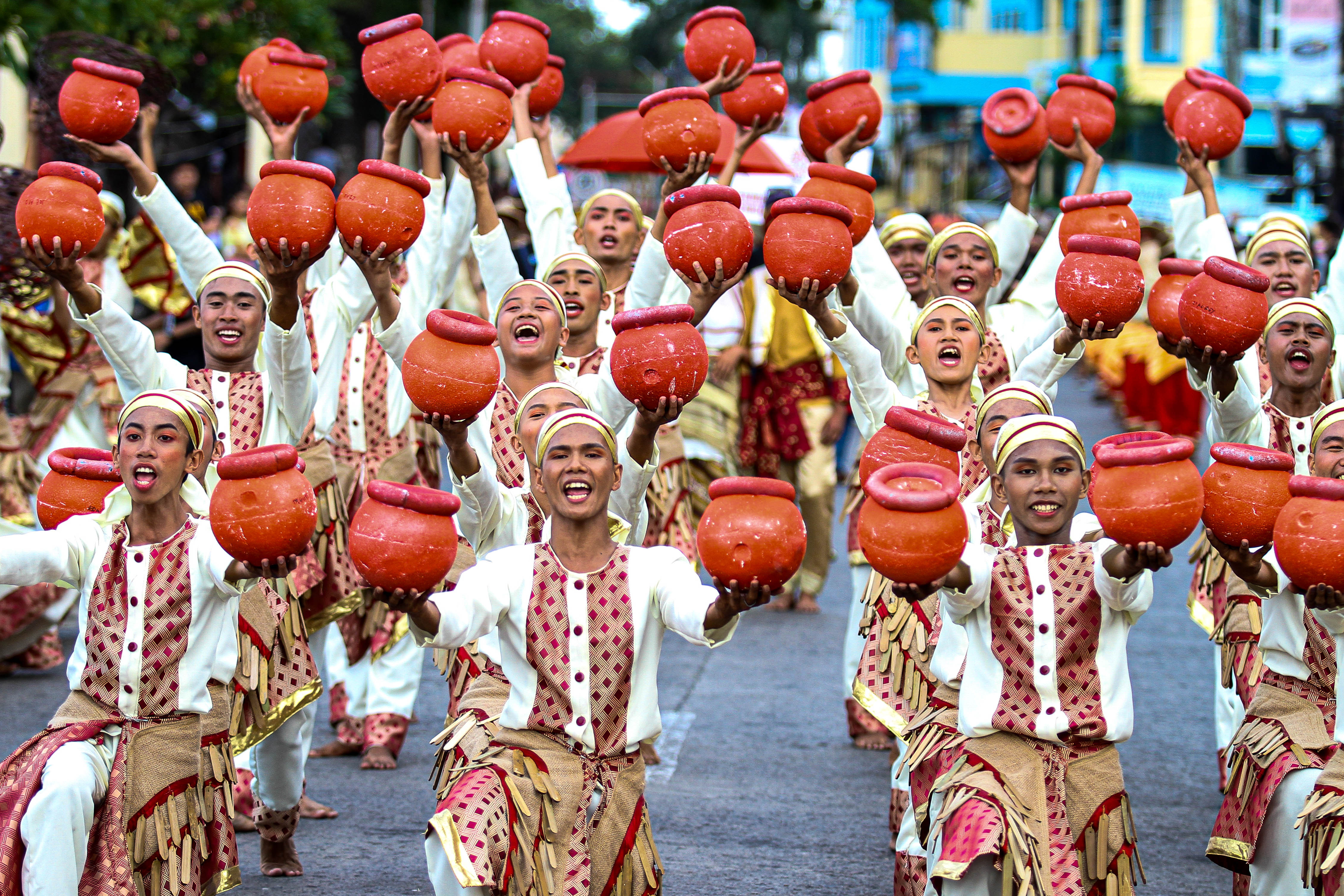
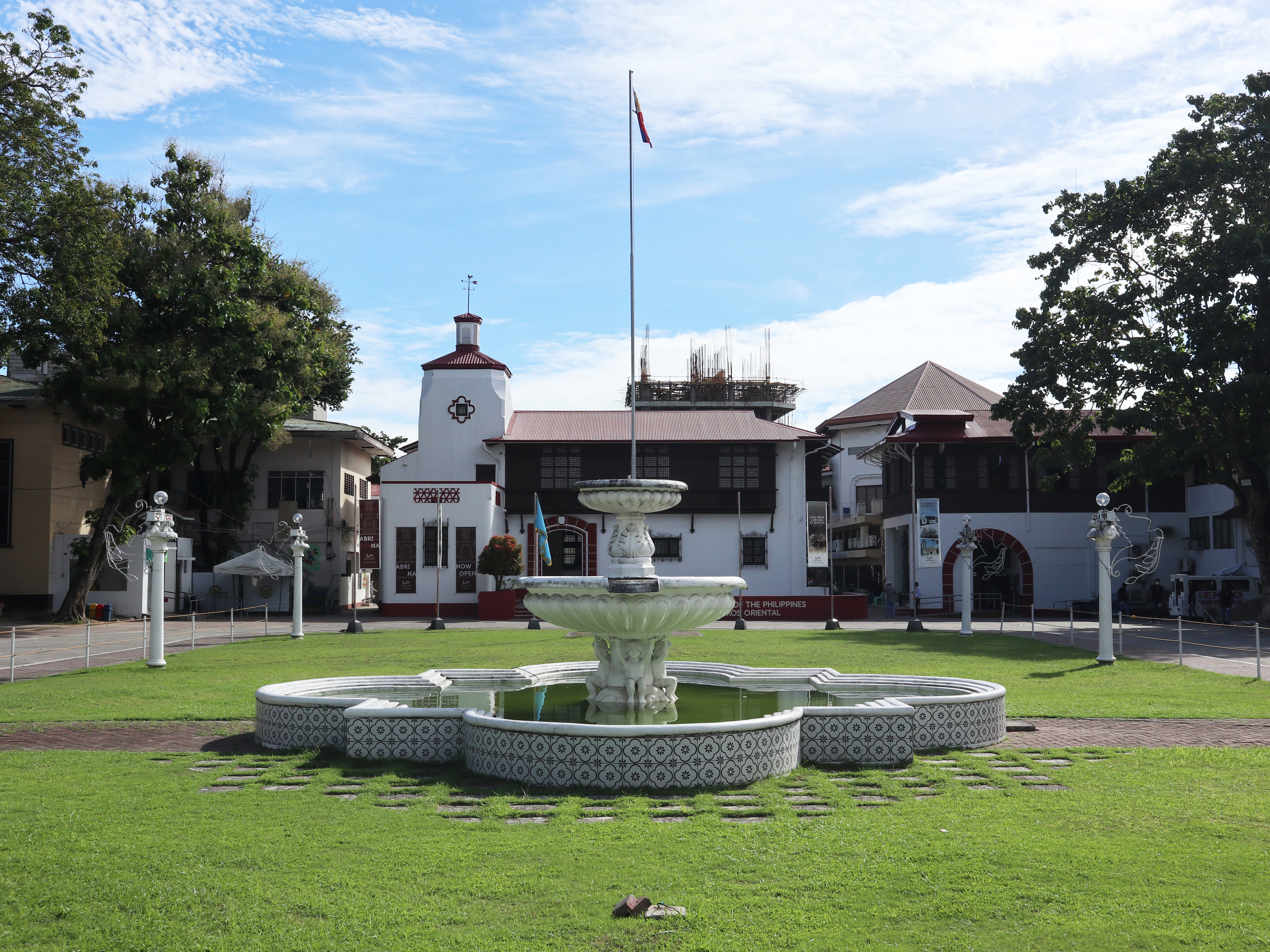
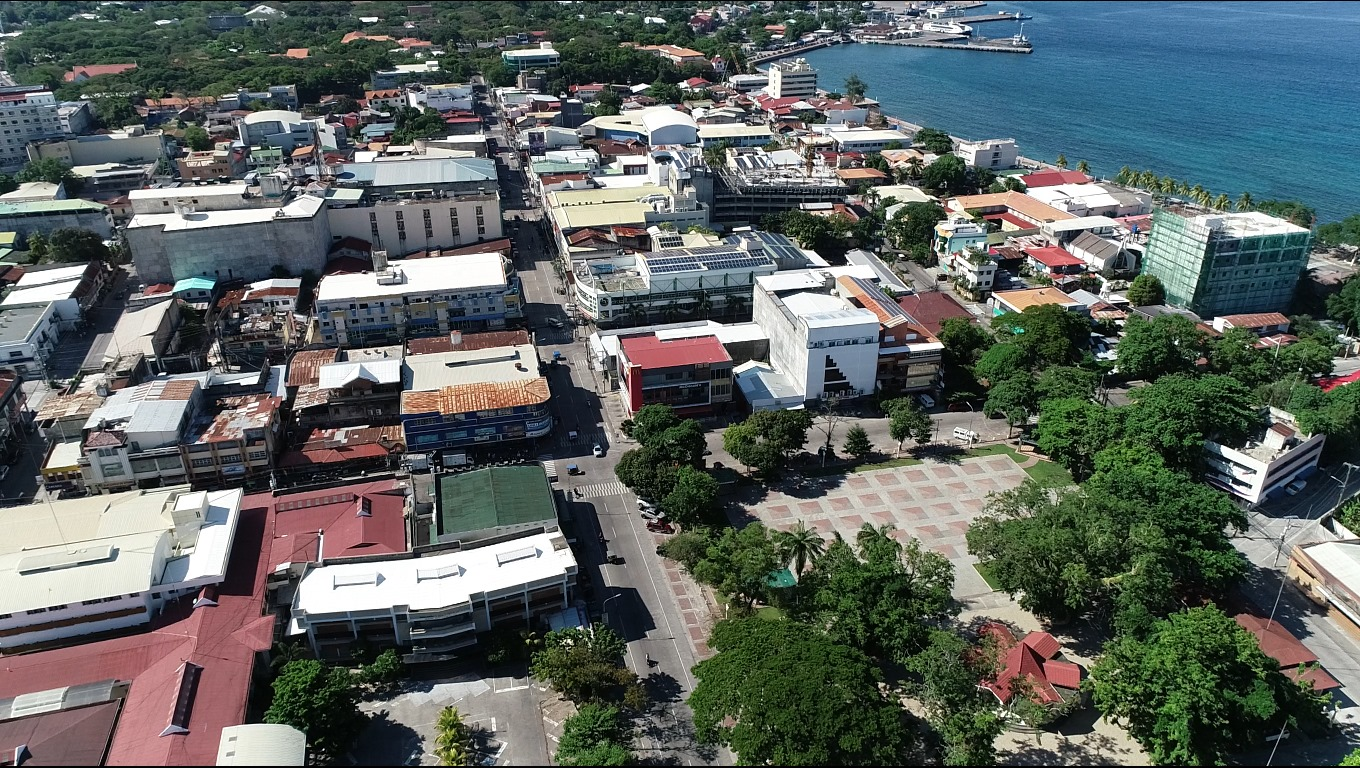
- Dumaguete Belfry Dumaguete Cathedral Sandurot Festival National Museum of the Philippines New Dumaguete City Hall Aerial view of Dumaguete

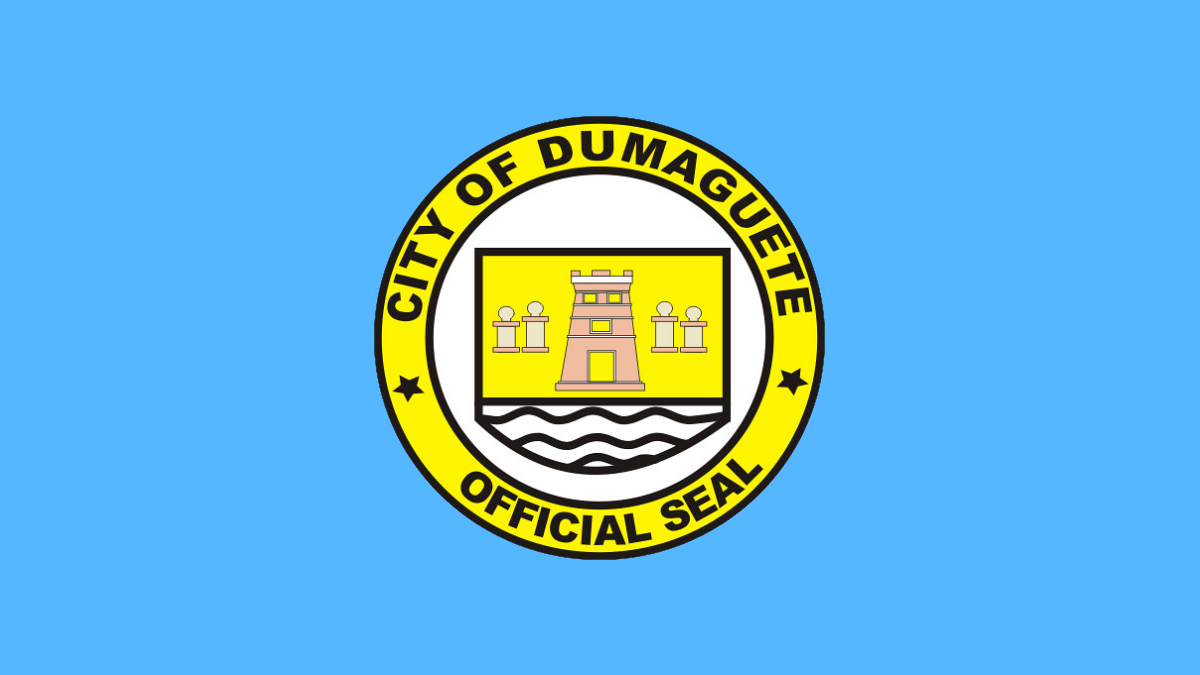
- Flag Seal
- Nickname: "City of Gentle People"
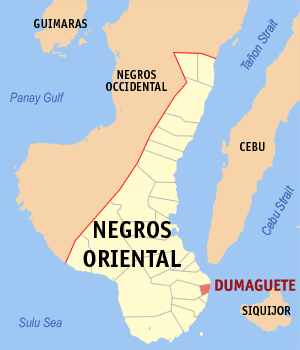
- Map of Negros Oriental with Dumaguete highlighted
- Interactive map of Dumaguete
- Location within the Philippines
- Coordinates: 9°18′37″N 123°18′29″E
- Country: Philippines
- Region: Negros Island Region
- Province: Negros Oriental
- District: 2nd district
- Cityhood: November 24, 1948
- Barangays: 30 (see Barangays)

Government
  - Type: Sangguniang Panlungsod
  - Mayor: Manuel "Chiquiting" T. Sagarbarria
  - Vice Mayor: Estanislao V. Alviola (NPC)
  - Representative: Maisa Sagarbarria (Lakas)
  - City Council: Members: Jason Patrick T. Lagahit; Melissa "Chessa" L. Sagarbarria; Maria Marife L. Cordova; Jose Victor V. Imbo; Woodtamm C. Maquiling; Bernice Anne A. Elmaco; Franklin D. Esmeña, Jr.; Rey Lyndon T. Lawas; Renz Macion; Antonio J. Remollo; Jovencio C. Tan, Jr. ^{‡}; Miguel Lorenzo N. Aseniero ^{◌}; ‡ ex officio ABC president; ◌ ex officio SK chairman
  - Electorate: 94,558 voters (2025)

Area
  - Total: 33.62 km^{2} (12.98 sq mi)
- Elevation: 183 m (600 ft)
- Highest elevation: 1,844 m (6,050 ft)
- Lowest elevation: 0 m (0 ft)

Population (2024 census)
  - Total: 142,171
  - Density: 4,229/km^{2} (10,950/sq mi)
  - Households: 32,276
- Demonym(s): Dumagueteño (masculine); Dumagueteña (feminine)

Economy
  - Income class: 2nd city income class
  - Poverty incidence: 7.99% (2023)
  - Revenue: ₱ 1,244 million (2024)
  - Assets: ₱ 5,447 million (2024)
  - Expenditure: ₱ 950.9 million (2024)

Service provider
  - Electricity: Negros Oriental 2 Electric Cooperative (NORECO 2)
  - Water: Metro Pacific Dumaguete Water Services, Inc. (Metro Dumaguete Water)
- Time zone: UTC+8 (PST)
- ZIP code: 6200
- PSGC: 074610000
- IDD : area code: +63 (0)35
- Native languages: Cebuano; Magahat; Tagalog
- Website: www.dumaguetecity.gov.ph

Dumaguete, officially the City of Dumaguete (Tagalog: [dʊmɐˈgɛtɛ]; Cebuano: Dakbayan sa Dumaguete; Filipino: Lungsod ng Dumaguete), is a component city and capital of the province of Negros Oriental, Philippines. According to the 2024 census, it has a population of 142,171 people. It is the most populous city and the smallest city by land area in Negros Oriental, as well as one of the two regional centers in Negros Island Region (the other one is Bacolod).

Dumaguete is a university city with four large universities and several colleges, attracting students from the province and across the country, mostly from the Visayas and Mindanao. The city is best known for Silliman University, the first Protestant and American university in the country and in Asia. Schools in Dumaguete include 18 public elementary schools and 10 public high schools.

In 2025, Dumaguete City has been designated as the country's first UNESCO Creative City of Literature.

Dumaguete is bounded by the towns of Bacong, Sibulan, and Valencia. The power source of the city comes from the geothermal power plant in Valencia.

== Etymology ==
"Dumaguete" was coined from the Cebuano word dagit, which means 'to snatch'. The word dumaguet, meaning 'to swoop', was coined because of the area's frequent raids by Moro pirates and its power to attract and keep visitors, both local and foreign. In 1572, Diego López Povedano indicated the place as Dananguet, but cartographer Pedro Murillo Velarde in 1734 already used the present name of Dumaguete for the settlement.

== History ==
=== Early history and the Spanish colonial era ===
Dumaguete, according Laura L. Junker, was already the site of a Chiefly Polity practicing intense commerce and industry by the 1100s AD. She labelled this polity, the Tanjay river polity, named after the nearby Tanjay river. Dumaguete City was then once settled by datus from Borneo who exiled themselves into the newly established Kedatuan of Madja-as. Albeit they also intermixed with the culturally Indianized Cebuano speakers of the nearby Rajahnate of Cebu. It became a prosperous province during Spanish times as during the year 1818, Dumaguete had 4,095 and 1/2 Tributes amounting to 18,261 people. Of which, there were 25 Spanish-Filipino tributes amounting to the same number of Spanish-Filipino families. However, after the Spanish colonization of the Philippines, the island of Negros was divided into the provinces of Negros Oriental and Negros Occidental by a royal decree executed by Governor General Valeriano Weyler on January 1, 1890. Dumaguete was also made the capital of the new Negros Oriental Province.

In 1898, months after the arrival of Emilio Aguinaldo from exile, the Negros Revolution suddenly broke out. Negros Occidental Province, which was still ruled by the Spanish authorities, eventually surrendered to the Negrense Revolutionary Forces after a battle on November 6. They then began a week-long march which captured Dumaguete on November 24. By this time, the Spanish forces had left the entirety of Negros. The "Negros Republic" was then proclaimed on November 27.

=== American era ===
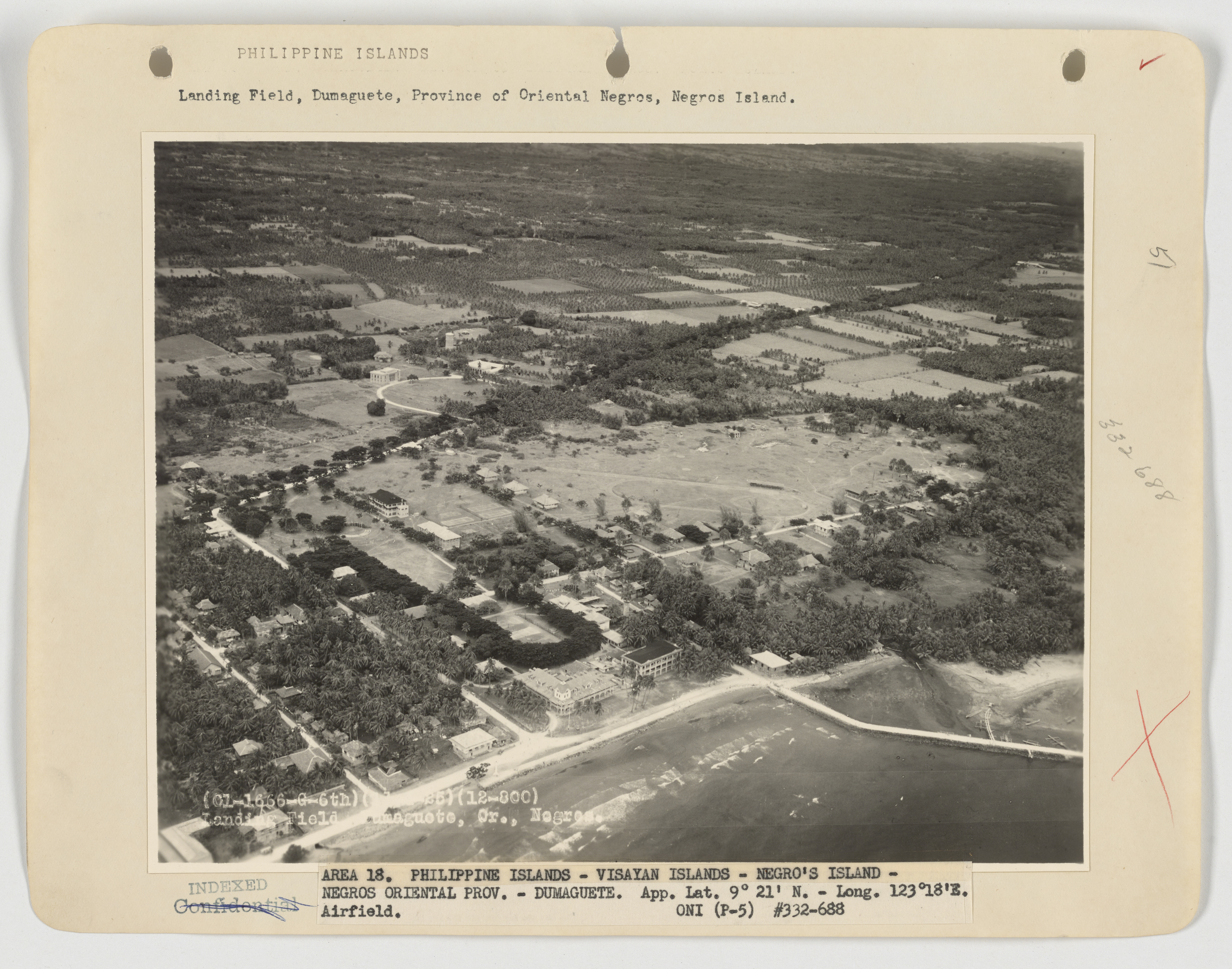
Aerial view of Dumaguete, date unknown

The American era saw the allegiance of the Republic of Negros grow towards a collaborationist stance as a Pro-American Protectorate amidst the Philippine-American War. The Americans saw the people of Negros as more dependable allies compared to other Filipinos. Therefore, Dumaguete observed the establishment of Silliman University, the first American-founded university in Asia.

=== Japanese occupation era ===
Imperial Japanese forces landed at Dumaguete on May 26, 1942, after the fall of the Philippines, and all of Negros Oriental Province surrendered shortly thereafter. Resistance against the Japanese occupation continued by guerilla groups in the inner mountains, where many native residents had fled to. The local Negrense guerillas attacked the remaining Japanese officials and troops on August 6, 1945, and after their victory, they welcomed combined American and Filipino forces that formally liberated Negros Oriental.

=== Cityhood ===
The City of Dumaguete was formally created on July 15, 1948, under Philippine Congressional Republic Act No. 327, also known as the "Charter of the City of Dumaguete". This was later amended on June 21, 1969, by Republic Act No. 5797, which clarified and refined the powers and functions of the local government unit in the earlier act.

=== Martial law ===
According to journalist Crispin Maslog who was teaching at Silliman University at the time, Dumaguete was one of the first cities in the country to learn about Marcos' declaration of martial law on September 23, 1972. Local news station DYSR was able to pick up the news from an Australian broadcast. Elsewhere in the country, media outlets such as newspapers and broadcast stations had already been shut down, but DSYR was able to make the announcement before Information Secretary Francisco Tatad did at around noon. DYSR itself would be shut down later that day.

Maslog recounts that Silliman University in Dumaguete was one of the last four universities in the Philippines to be allowed to reopen for classes, with Marcos himself complaining about instances where members of the political opposition such as Senators Jovito Salonga and Juan Liwag were invited to speak at the university.

In the mid-1980s, the crony capitalism which characterized the Marcos administration had a major effect on the island of Negros in which Dumaguete is located. A sugar hoarding scheme by National Sugar Trading Corporation (NASUTRA) of Roberto Benedicto backfired, resulting in the mass-firing of sugar workers in Negros Oriental and Negros Occidental. Worsened by the economic nosedive which had begun in 1983, it eventually became known as the 1985 Negros famine.

== Geography and environment ==
Dumaguete has a land area of 3,362 hectares (8,310 acres), situated on the plains of the southeastern coast of the large island of Negros, near the mouth of the Banica River. Of the province's 19 municipalities and 6 cities, Dumaguete is the smallest in terms of land area. It is bounded on the north by Sibulan, south by Bacong, and west by Valencia.

As a coastal city, it is bounded on the east by the Bohol Sea and the Tañon Strait, serving as a natural border of the southeastern border of Negros Oriental. The city's topography is generally flat from two to six kilometers from the shoreline. It slopes gently upwards to the adjoining municipality of Valencia. The highest ground elevation is located at the boundary of the municipality of Valencia, about one hundred meters above mean sea level. About 93% of the land have slopes of less than 3%. The remaining areas have a 3% to 5% slope.

=== Climate ===
Dumaguete has a tropical monsoon climate according to the Köppen Climate classification with two distinct seasons: wet and dry. The wet season covers the period from June to November, and the dry season starts from December to May, the hottest being April and May. The average maximum temperature is 30.9 °C and the average minimum temperature is 24.8 °C for the 1991-2020 normals. The relative humidity of the locality for the past years was 81% with January registering the highest.

Northeast monsoon winds (amihan) bring cooler temperatures with little sometimes moderate rain to the city during late October until early March. Trade winds from the Pacific help moderate the sultry conditions of the dry season during April and May, and usually record less hot daytime conditions than the rest of the country; yet nearby warm seas also cause warm and humid nights during this time. When no major wind system is in power, trade winds can occur all year round, providing similar conditions. Southwest monsoon winds (habagat) usually bring overcast and rainy conditions from June to early October, but can also bring the hottest temperatures of the year due to the foehn effect; nevertheless, skies are usually clear that nights feel cool, having the widest temperature variation in a day at this time.

Climate data for Dumaguete (1991-2020, extremes 1910–2021)
Month	Jan	Feb	Mar	Apr	May	Jun	Jul	Aug	Sep	Oct	Nov	Dec	Year
Record high °C (°F)	33.7 (92.7)	34.2 (93.6)	34.2 (93.6)	36.8 (98.2)	36.2 (97.2)	37.4 (99.3)	36.6 (97.9)	36.7 (98.1)	37.0 (98.6)	36.1 (97.0)	34.7 (94.5)	34.2 (93.6)	37.4 (99.3)
Mean daily maximum °C (°F)	29.2 (84.6)	29.4 (84.9)	30.2 (86.4)	31.2 (88.2)	31.9 (89.4)	31.7 (89.1)	31.5 (88.7)	31.9 (89.4)	31.7 (89.1)	31.2 (88.2)	30.7 (87.3)	30.1 (86.2)	30.9 (87.6)
Daily mean °C (°F)	26.9 (80.4)	26.9 (80.4)	27.5 (81.5)	28.3 (82.9)	28.7 (83.7)	28.4 (83.1)	28.0 (82.4)	28.2 (82.8)	28.1 (82.6)	27.9 (82.2)	27.9 (82.2)	27.6 (81.7)	27.9 (82.2)
Mean daily minimum °C (°F)	24.6 (76.3)	24.5 (76.1)	24.7 (76.5)	25.4 (77.7)	25.5 (77.9)	25.0 (77.0)	24.5 (76.1)	24.4 (75.9)	24.4 (75.9)	24.6 (76.3)	25.1 (77.2)	25.0 (77.0)	24.8 (76.6)
Record low °C (°F)	19.3 (66.7)	19.8 (67.6)	19.6 (67.3)	18.9 (66.0)	20.7 (69.3)	20.7 (69.3)	19.8 (67.6)	20.5 (68.9)	18.0 (64.4)	20.8 (69.4)	20.4 (68.7)	19.8 (67.6)	18.0 (64.4)
Average rainfall mm (inches)	96.7 (3.81)	73.7 (2.90)	68.2 (2.69)	49.1 (1.93)	84.5 (3.33)	144.0 (5.67)	146.0 (5.75)	104.6 (4.12)	116.8 (4.60)	158.6 (6.24)	146.4 (5.76)	134.0 (5.28)	1,322.6 (52.08)
Average rainy days (≥ 0.1 mm)	11	8	7	5	8	12	14	11	12	13	11	12	124
Average relative humidity (%)	84	83	81	79	79	81	82	80	81	82	82	83	81
Source: PAGASA

=== Environment ===
Dumaguete has a rich and unique marine ecosystem that provides livelihoods to fishers and supports tourism. The coastal environment, which includes seagrass meadows, acts as efficient carbon sinks that mitigate the effects of climate change. This ecosystem includes 36.15 hectares of seagrasses and 36.20 hectares of coral reef. Dumaguete has four marine protected areas covering 104 hectares that host over 200 species of fish.

In 2021, the fragile marine ecosystem was under threat from a proposed 174 ha (430-acre) reclamation project that was met with opposition from youth organizations, church groups, residents, and environmental scientists, including Philippine national scientist Angel Alcala. Later that year, the city government halted the project.

=== Barangays ===
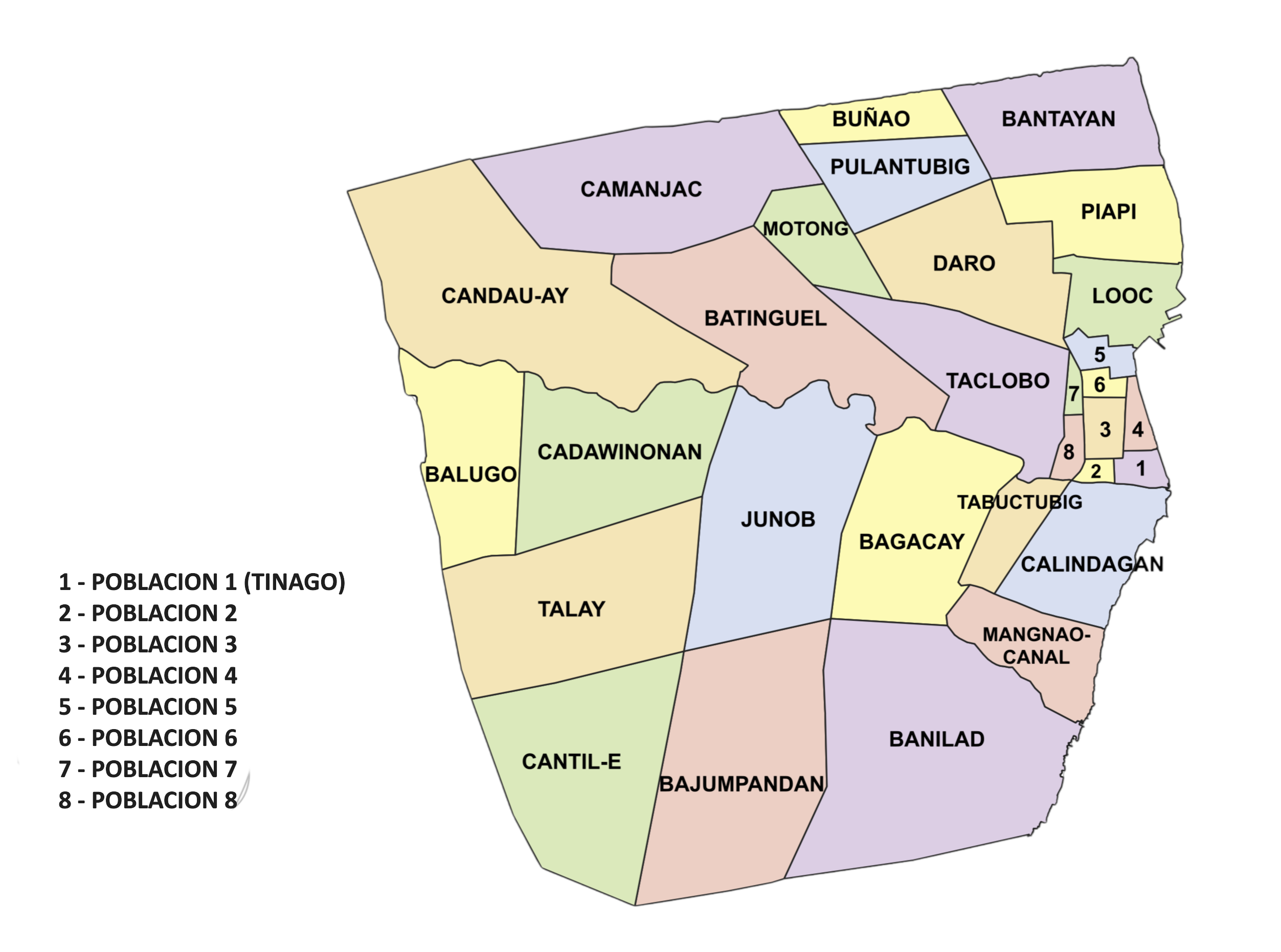
Political map of Dumaguete

Dumaguete is politically subdivided into 30 barangays. Each barangay consists of puroks and some have sitios.

Most of the barangays are classified as urban. The eight poblacions comprise the city's downtown area and are assigned by numbers. The smallest barangay is Poblacion 4 with an area of only 5.11 hectares, while the largest is Banilad with 362.71 hectares.

PSGC	Barangay	Population			±% p.a.	
		2024		2010		
074610001	Bagacay	6.7%	9,592	8,266	▴	1.03%
074610002	Bajumpandan	5.5%	7,880	4,500	▴	3.93%
074610003	Balugo	2.9%	4,110	2,980	▴	2.24%
074610004	Banilad	6.8%	9,664	8,286	▴	1.06%
074610005	Bantayan	3.1%	4,430	4,920	▾	−0.72%
074610006	Batinguel	7.0%	9,965	8,148	▴	1.39%
074610007	Buñao	1.9%	2,723	2,727	▾	−0.01%
074610008	Cadawinonan	4.8%	6,887	4,892	▴	2.38%
074610009	Calindagan	4.7%	6,709	8,056	▾	−1.25%
074610010	Camanjac	3.4%	4,859	4,142	▴	1.10%
074610011	Candau-ay	6.7%	9,593	6,583	▴	2.62%
074610012	Cantil-e	3.3%	4,697	3,229	▴	2.61%
074610013	Daro	4.3%	6,164	6,373	▾	−0.23%
074610014	Junob	5.4%	7,651	6,054	▴	1.62%
074610015	Looc	2.9%	4,063	4,058	▴	0.01%
074610016	Mangnao-Canal	2.2%	3,113	3,707	▾	−1.19%
074610017	Motong	1.7%	2,429	2,137	▴	0.89%
074610018	Piapi	3.4%	4,842	6,149	▾	−1.63%
074610019	Poblacion 1 (Tinago)	1.5%	2,141	2,170	▾	−0.09%
074610020	Poblacion 2 (Upper Luke Wright)	0.7%	1,055	1,305	▾	−1.45%
074610021	Poblacion 3 (Business Section)	0.1%	193	150	▴	1.75%
074610022	Poblacion 4 (Rizal Boulevard)	0.2%	225	218	▴	0.22%
074610023	Poblacion 5 (Silliman Area)	0.1%	142	132	▴	0.50%
074610024	Poblacion 6 (Cambagroy)	0.2%	255	325	▾	−1.66%
074610025	Poblacion 7 (Mangga)	0.1%	175	202	▾	−0.98%
074610026	Poblacion 8 (Cervantes Extension)	1.1%	1,569	2,363	▾	−2.78%
074610027	Pulantubig	2.1%	2,994	3,266	▾	−0.60%
074610028	Tabuctubig	1.0%	1,399	1,684	▾	−1.27%
074610029	Taclobo	6.7%	9,458	9,691	▾	−0.17%
074610030	Talay	3.6%	5,126	4,170	▴	1.43%
	Total		142,171	120,883	▴	1.12%

== Demographics ==
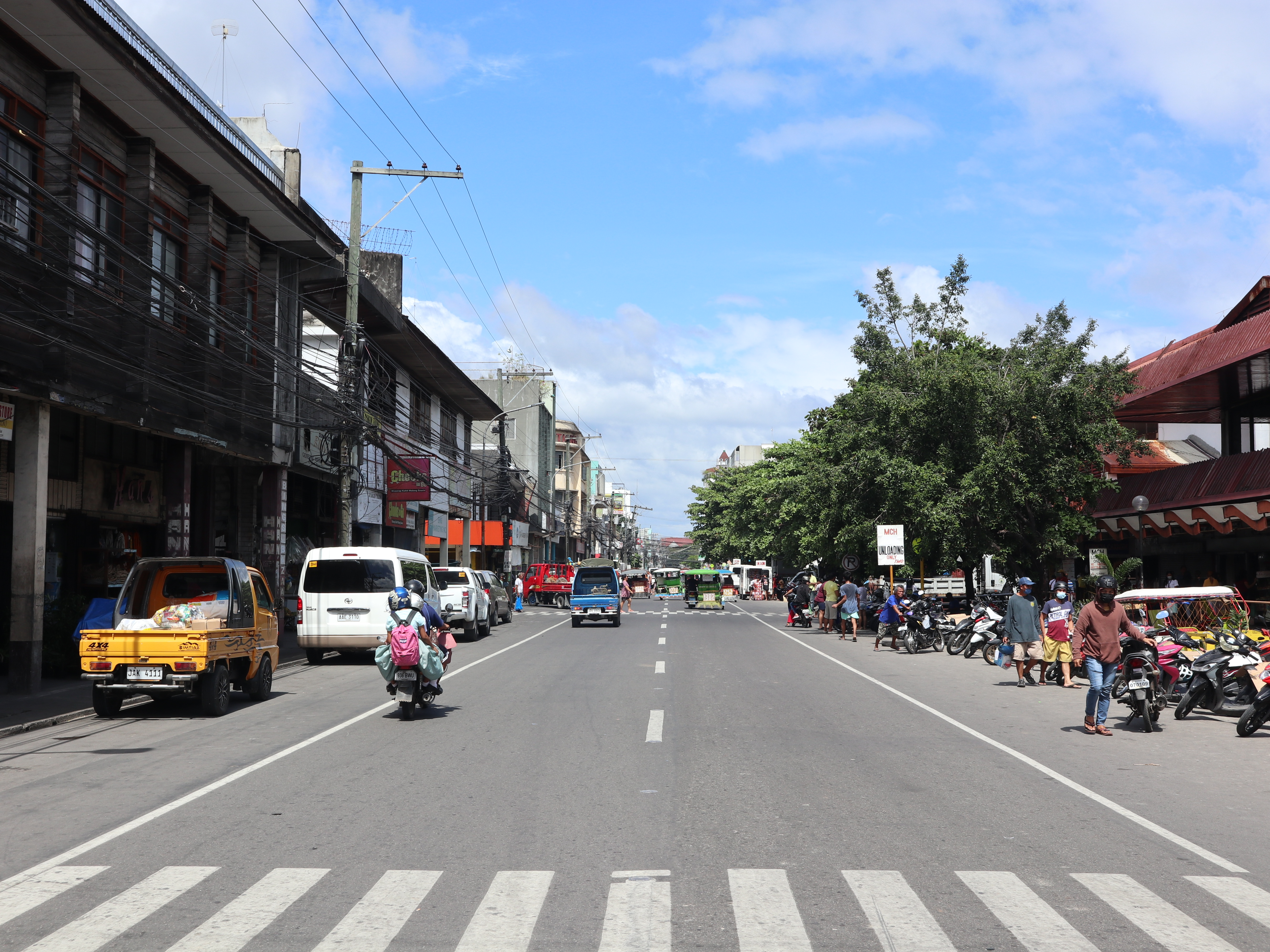
Real Street, Dumaguete City

As of the census in 2024, there are 142,171 people. According to the National Statistical Coordination Board, Dumaguete has the lowest poverty incidence among urban centers in the Visayas. It has an average daylight population of 400,000 people. Dumaguete is the most populous city in Negros Oriental, comprising 9.05% of the province's total population. During the 2019 election, its total voting population was 89,193 voters.

The Philippine Retirement Authority, a government agency under the Department of Tourism, has named the city as the "Best Place to Retire in the Philippines for 2018". Dumaguete is also listed fifth in Forbes Magazine's "7 Best Places to Retire Around the World".

Population census of Dumaguete

Year	Pop.	±% p.a.
1903	14,894	—
1918	16,336	+0.62%
1939	22,236	+1.48%
1948	24,838	+1.24%
1960	35,282	+2.97%
1970	52,000	+3.95%

Year	Pop.	±% p.a.
1975	52,765	+0.29%
1980	63,411	+3.74%
1990	80,262	+2.39%
1995	92,637	+2.72%
2000	102,265	+2.14%
2007	116,392	+1.80%

Year	Pop.	±% p.a.
2010	120,883	+1.39%
2015	131,377	+1.60%
2020	134,103	+0.43%
2024	142,171	+1.41%

Source: Philippine Statistics Authority

== Economy ==
Poverty incidence of Dumaguete (%)

Source: Philippine Statistics Authority

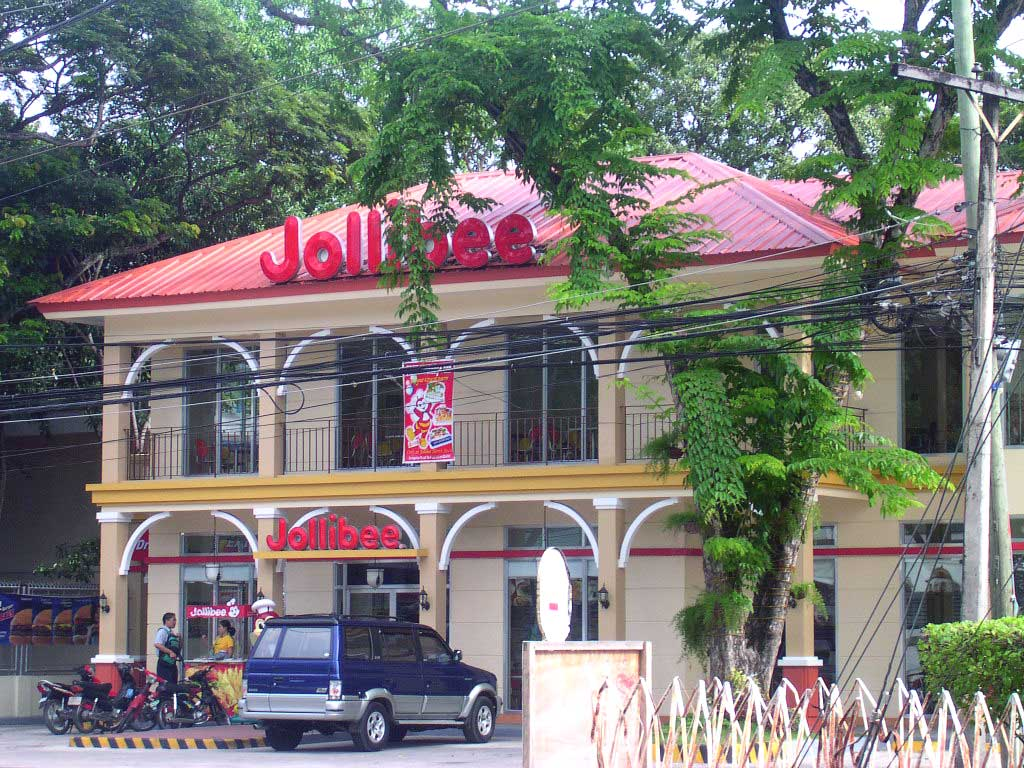
A Jollibee branch in Dumaguete

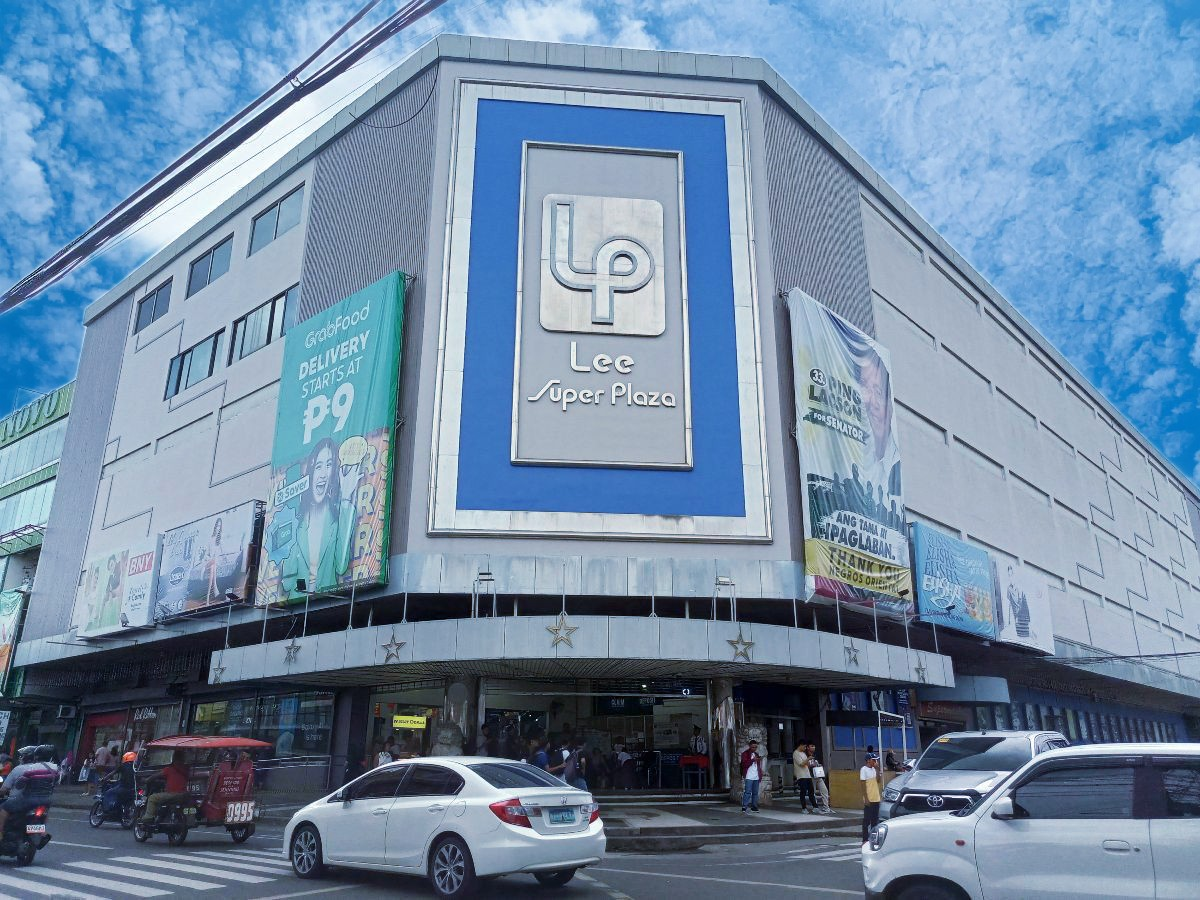
Lee Super Plaza, a homegrown shopping mall in Dumaguete

The major sources of income in Dumaguete are tourism, the academe, retail, BPO, technology, and IT firms. There are a significant number of banking institutions include a branch of Bangko Sentral ng Pilipinas in Dumaguete. Shopping centers in Dumaguete include CityMall Dumaguete (Brgy. Daro), Unitop Mall (Brgy. Poblacion 8), WeShop Center (Brgy. Poblacion 8 & Daro), Cang's Inc. Shopping Complex (Brgy. Daro), Lee Super Plaza (Brgy. Poblacion 3), Filinvest Malls Dumaguete (Brgy. Piapi) and Robinsons Dumaguete (Brgy. Calindagan). Business activities are mostly concentrated in the downtown area.

With the completion of four lanes, the Metro Dumaguete Diversion Road helps decongest the traffic in the main thoroughfares of the central business district from the town of Sibulan down to Bacong. The new highway is expected to economically benefit the city's barangays as the new centers for economic growth.

These growing industries have made Dumaguete the hub for shopping, education, finance, IT, commerce, lifestyle, and sports in the province of Negros Oriental.

=== Real estate and infrastructure ===
The real estate industry in the city includes several constructions of condominiums, mixed-use development town centers, and massive horizontal housing projects. Shopping centers such as Filinvest Malls Dumaguete by Filinvest Group, Bayshores Dumaguete, and popular restaurants, bars, and dining strips along Flores Avenue have excellent views of Dumaguete Bay. Filinvest is set to develop the beach area for another vertical residential complex in the coastal barangay of Mangnao through its Futura Shores Dumaguete.

CityMall Dumaguete, a community mall anchored by SM Retail (SM Savemore and Ace Hardware) owned by DoubleDragon Properties, and Cang's Shopping Complex are located on the national highway serving shoppers in the north. A public transport terminal with multi-level parking spaces is being built at the back of Robinsons Dumaguete within the Dumaguete Business Park. Joining the existing Dumaguete Business Park are the Lifestyle 8880 District, a commercial complex with hotel and convention center in Daro, and the E.C. Ouano Sr. Complex in Bajumpandan, which is being used for government offices and other facilities.

=== Business process outsourcing ===
Dumaguete's outsourcing industry has a range of businesses, such as call centers, publishing, medical transcription, animation, editing, and architectural outsourcing. Dumaguete is listed among Next Wave Cities in the country with over 30 IT, KPO and BPO locators, and has been described as a hub for Business Process Outsourcing and Information Technology.

== Tourism ==
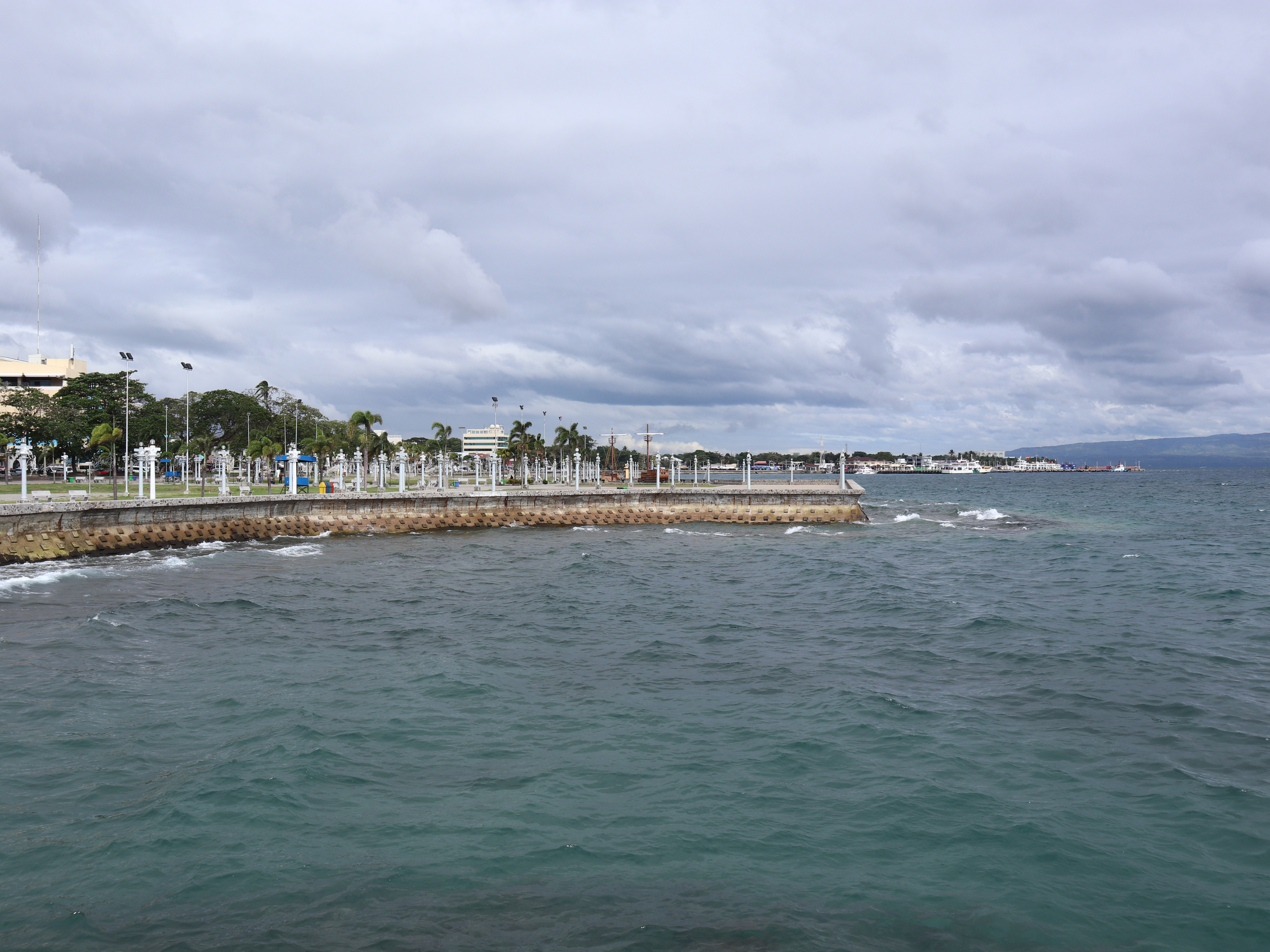
Skyline of Pantawan de Dumaguete

Data from the Department of Tourism show that Dumaguete, the province's main gateway, and Negros Oriental are listed among the top ten most visited tourist destinations in the country.

=== Historical landmarks ===
Rizal Boulevard is known for its hotels, coffee shops, fine dining restaurants, and bars that were mostly converted from sugar mansions and prominent ancestral houses. The boulevard extension to the north of the Port of Dumaguete is also being developed with new hotels, resorts, restaurants, and bars. The boulevard provides views of Dumaguete Bay and the neighboring islands of Cebu and Siquijor.

Rizal Boulevard also has a promenade where locals and visitors can relax, dine, and exercise. This area, known locally as Pantawan People's Park, extends from the Port of Dumaguete to the mouth of the Banica River. Food carts in the Pantawan area sell Filipino street food such as balut, tempura, kikiam, and fishballs. The reclaimed Pantawan People's Park is the city's newest park located at the southern end of Rizal Boulevard.

The St. Catherine of Alexandria Cathedral is known as the oldest stone church of Negros Island and the ecclesiastical seat of the bishop of the Roman Catholic Diocese of Dumaguete. The detached 1879 Campanario, the belfry on one of the watchtowers of the cathedral, had been used to warn against moro invaders in the 1800 Spanish–Moro conflict. It is one of the oldest heritage landmarks of Dumaguete and Central Visayas. On November 23, 2023, Msgr. Julius Perpetuo Heruela, chair of the Commission on Church Cultural Heritage announced the Important Cultural Property historical marker installation at the Campanario. On May 29, 2024, the National Museum of the Philippines granted P9-M funds for the belfry conservation and restoration of cultural property project. The renovation, reinforcement and retrofitting will be a joint undertaking of the NMP, Diocese of Dumaguete and the local government.

The Dumaguete Presidencia, formerly the city hall, was restored to its original design and is now the branch of the National Museum in Dumaguete. The cathedral, belfry, and museum are all located near Quezon Park, named after the first President of the Philippines, Manuel L. Quezon.

Silliman University's Anthropology Museum, located in the university's Hibbard Hall, contains archaeological artifacts excavated from throughout Negros and parts of Mindanao. The National Commission for Culture and the Arts and Dumaguete LGU installed Eddie Romero's centennial bust by sculptor Frederic Caedo. It was unveiled by Mayor Felipe Antonio B. Remollo, Joey Romero and NCCA Deputy Director Marichu Tellano at the Claire Isabel McGill Luce Auditorium.

==== Negros Oriental Capitol building ====
On May 17, 2024, the 1924 Grecian-Ionic Daniel Burnham "Negros Oriental Capitol" building's historical marker for the centennial anniversary-"Jubilee Year" commemoration was installed by the National Historical Commission of the Philippines' Directress Carminda Arevalo. Governor Manuel "Chaco" L. Sagarbarria signed the marker's Certificate of Transfer in the presence of Imee Marcos, Francis Tolentino, Mark Villar, Risa Hontiveros, Lito Lapid, Jinggoy Estrada, Irish Ambassador William John Carlos and Philippine Tour Operators Association who graced the historic event. Kuh Ledesma, Silliman University Dance Troupe and Orchestra Sin Arco performed with others followed by the finale, Pyro Musical Competition at the Freedom Park.

=== Festivals ===
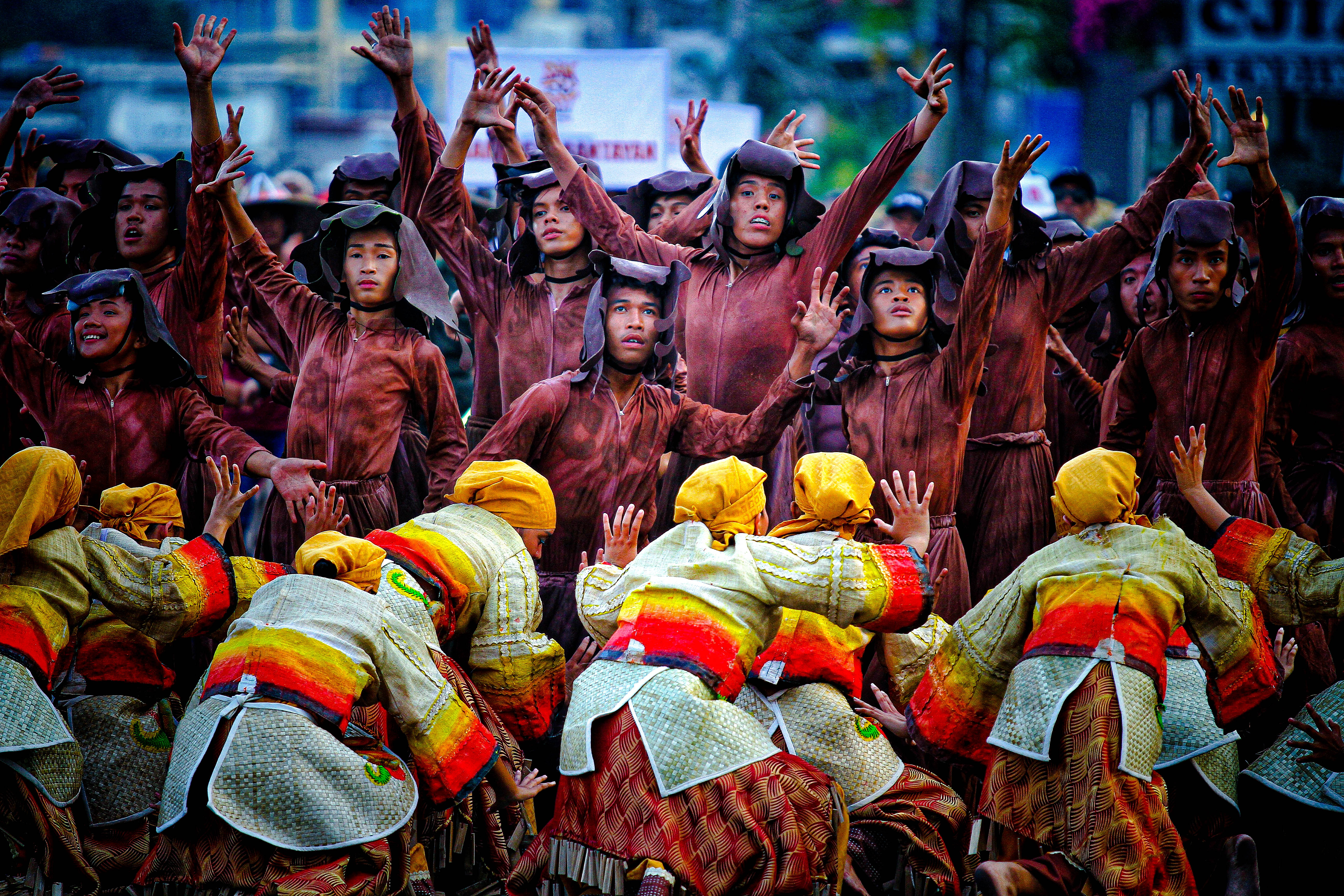
Sandurot Festival street dance

One of the city's important annual celebrations is the Sandurot Festival, which is held every September to commemorate Dumaguete's history. The celebration starts with the Paghimamat, a re-enactment of how people from different ethnic and cultural backgrounds came to Dumaguete, bringing gifts of rich cultures. Pasundalan follows, gracing the city streets with dancing to drumbeats and other instruments participated by different barangays and schools in Dumaguete. The street dancing ends at Quezon Park after which the participants prepare for the grand Pasundayag, a display of dances portraying different stories of the Dumaguete tradition.

Another important annual occasion in Dumaguete is the Buglasan Festival, also known locally as the "Festival of All Festivals", which is also held throughout the whole Negros Oriental province every October since 2002. The majority of activities are held in the Provincial Capitol and Ninoy Aquino Memorial Freedom Park with booths and local products either on display or for sale. It is also spread to other venues such as the Sidlakang Negros Village at Barangay Piapi and the city's Rizal Boulevard. Showdowns and street dancing are among the activities done in observance of the festival.

== Healthcare ==
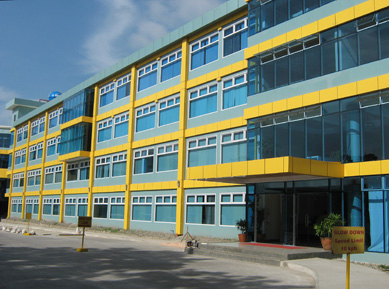
Silliman University Medical Center

Dumaguete has four major tertiary hospitals, namely the Holy Child Hospital (HCH), Negros Oriental Provincial Hospital, ACE Dumaguete Doctors Hospital, and the Silliman University Medical Center which is currently associated with St. Luke's Medical Center in Metro Manila. The Dumaguete Health Office is responsible for the implementation and planning of the health care programs provided by the city government, which also operates and supervises Health Centers in the barangays of the city.

== Transportation ==
=== Air ===
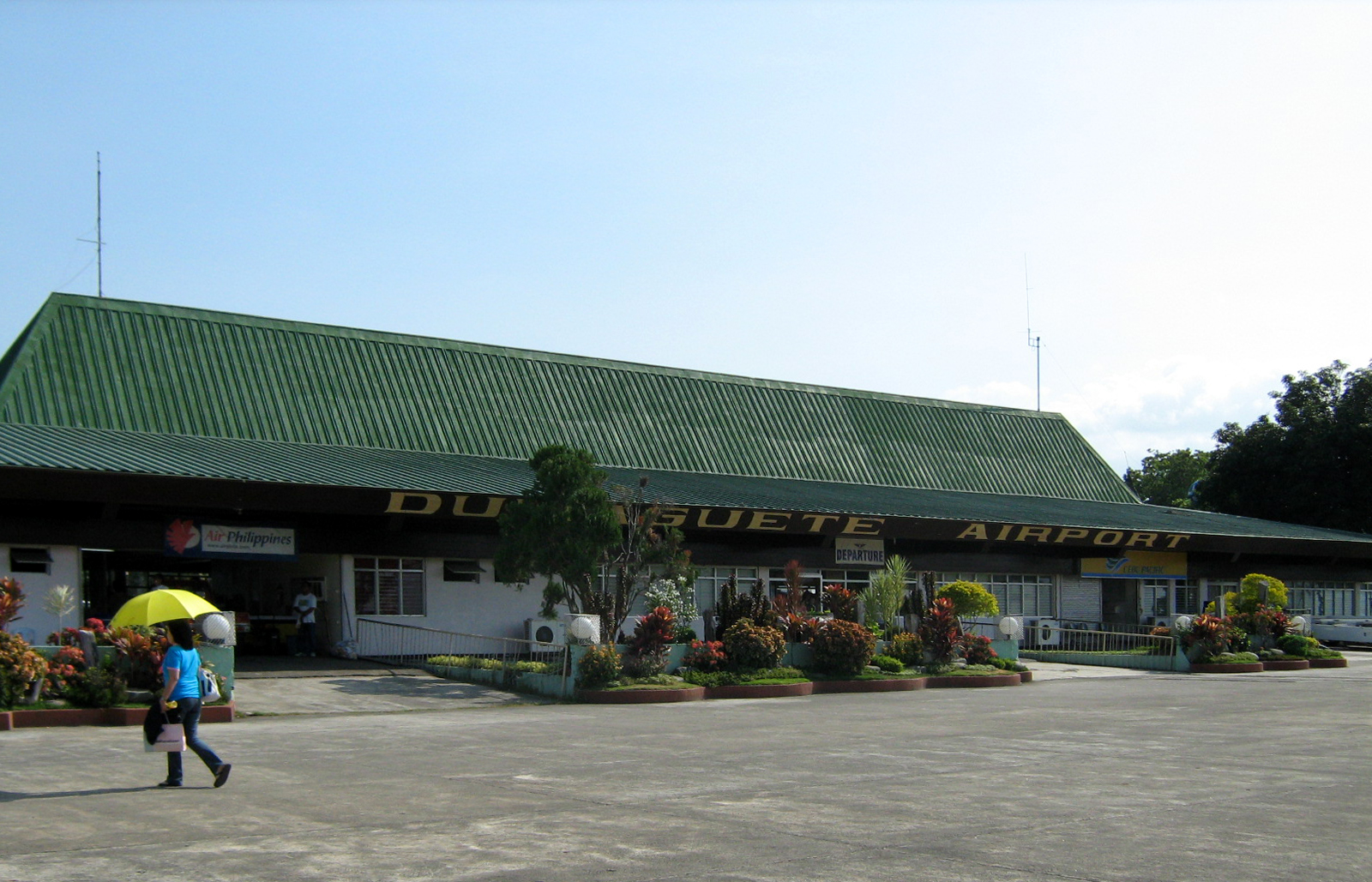
Sibulan Airport

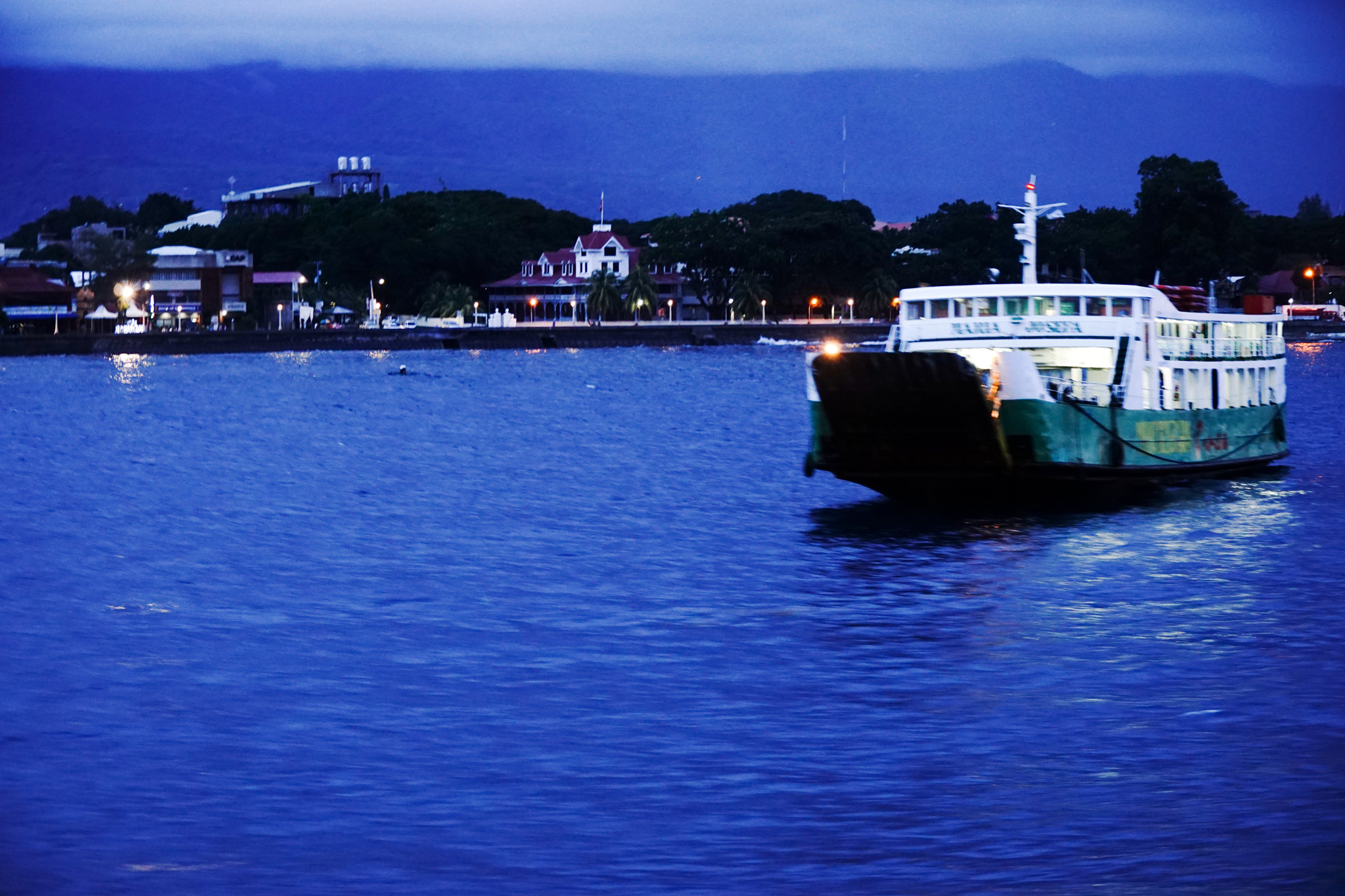
The Port of Dumaguete

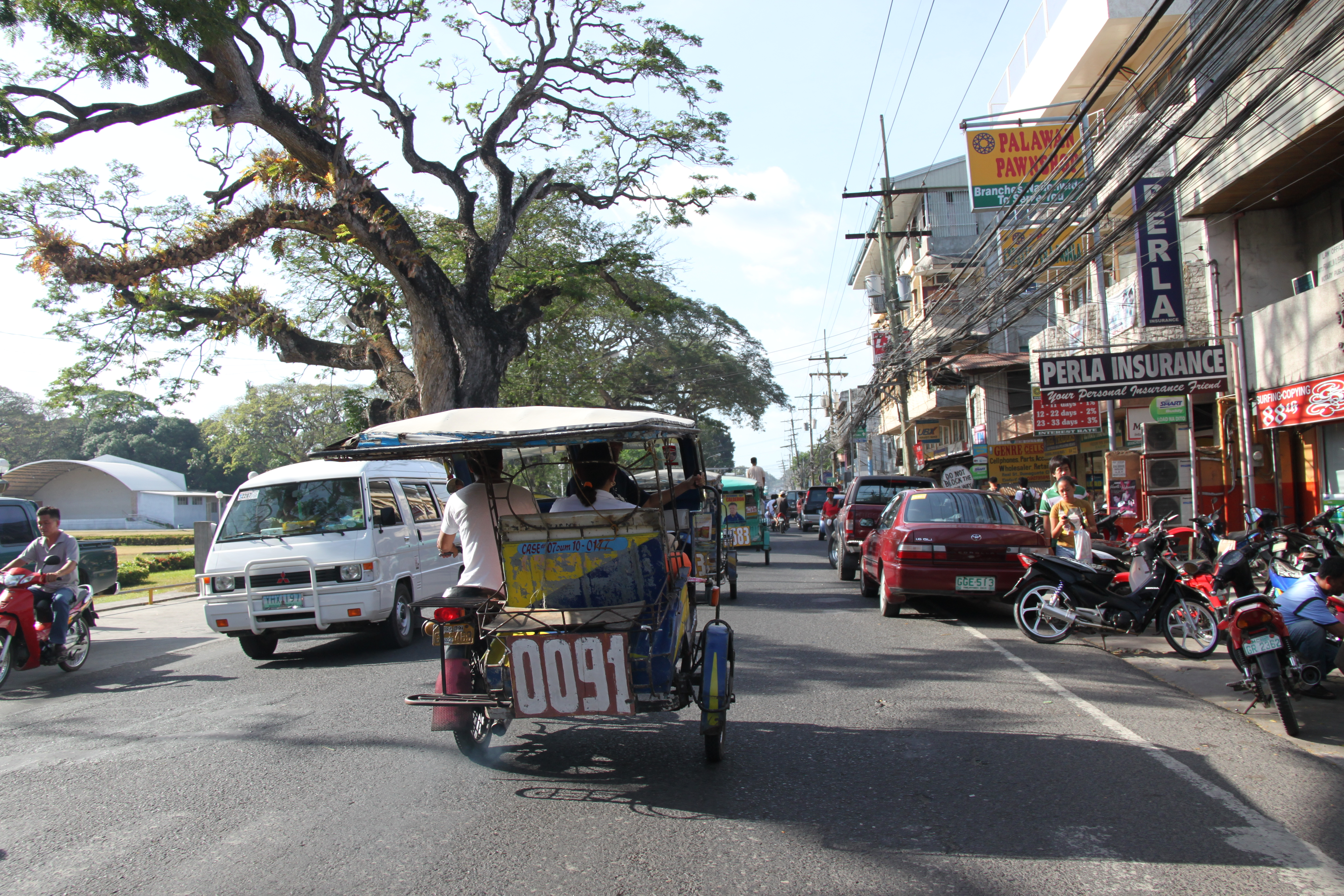
A tricycle in Dumaguete, one of the primary modes of public transport in the city.

Dumaguete-Sibulan Airport is the city's domestic airport located in the neighboring town of Sibulan in the north. It provides daily flights to and from Manila and Cebu City through Cebu Pacific, Cebgo and PAL Express while Cebu Pacific is servicing thrice weekly flights to Iloilo City. In March 2021, upgrade works were made to the Dumaguete-Sibulan Airport which included pavement reconstruction, expansion of the terminal building, and expansion of CAAP administrative buildings.

An airport to replace Sibulan Airport is being planned to be built in Bacong, a town bordering Dumaguete in the south. Construction is expected to cost ₱17 billion.

=== Sea ===
Dumaguete, as a major port city, is a jump-off point for passengers travelling to other Visayas and Mindanao areas. Currently, the port is equipped with two modern port operations and passenger terminal facilities. It is also the headquarters site of Philippine Coast Guard Southern Visayas District and Coast Guard Station Negros Oriental. As a major point of the Philippine Western Nautical Highway System, there are daily ferry connections to Cebu, Bohol, Siquijor and Mindanao operated by Archipelago Philippine Ferries Corporation (FastCat), Aleson Shipping Lines, Montenegro Lines, Medallion Transport, Ocean Jet Shipping, Seen Sam Shipping Inc., Cokaliong, H S Star Marine Shipping Corp., Lite Ferries and other companies.

Alternatively, there are smaller ports north of the city where short and frequent ferry connections mostly to the Province of Cebu are available. Dumaguete is a port of call for travelers to Manila, Dapitan, and Zamboanga City by a ship serviced by 2GO Travel.

=== Land ===
The main form of public transport in Dumaguete is the motorized tricycle. The Dumaguete version of the motorized tricycle can fit up to six passengers.

For transport to destinations outside the city limit, there are jeepneys and buses travelling set routes. Vallacar Transit Corporation operates Ceres buses from a 2-storey terminal building in Barangay Calindagan. Buses from Dumaguete have routes going to Bacolod/Negros Occidental, Cebu City/Cebu Province, Zamboanga City and Pagadian City via Dipolog/Dapitan of Zamboanga Peninsula, Caticlan (Boracay) and Cubao/Metro Manila using Western Nautical Highway. Dumaguete is 215 kilometres (134 mi) from Bacolod City via Kabankalan-Mabinay-Bais Road.

== Sports ==
Dumaguete has hosted numerous Asian, national, regional, and provincial sports events, such as the 4th Asian University Basketball Federation (AUBF) 2005, the 2013 Palarong Pambansa, 2012 Philippine National Games (POC-PSC), Philippine Volleyball League, National Frisbee Championship, Batang Pinoy Visayas, Dumaguete Dragon Boat Challenge, Unigames, CVIRAA, the Palarong NIR for short-lived Negros Island Region among others. The Don Mariano Perdices Memorial Coliseum hosted the 2010 Central Visayas Regional Athletic Meet and 2013 Palarong Pambansa that was located in Dumaguete. Its capacity was 25,000 people with a rubberized track oval, main lobby, dormitory, and hostel. Beside it is the Olympic-sized swimming pool known as the Lorenzo G. Teves Memorial Aqua Center. The Lamberto Macias Sports Complex is an indoor arena located near the coliseum which can accommodate around 6,000 people.

== Education ==
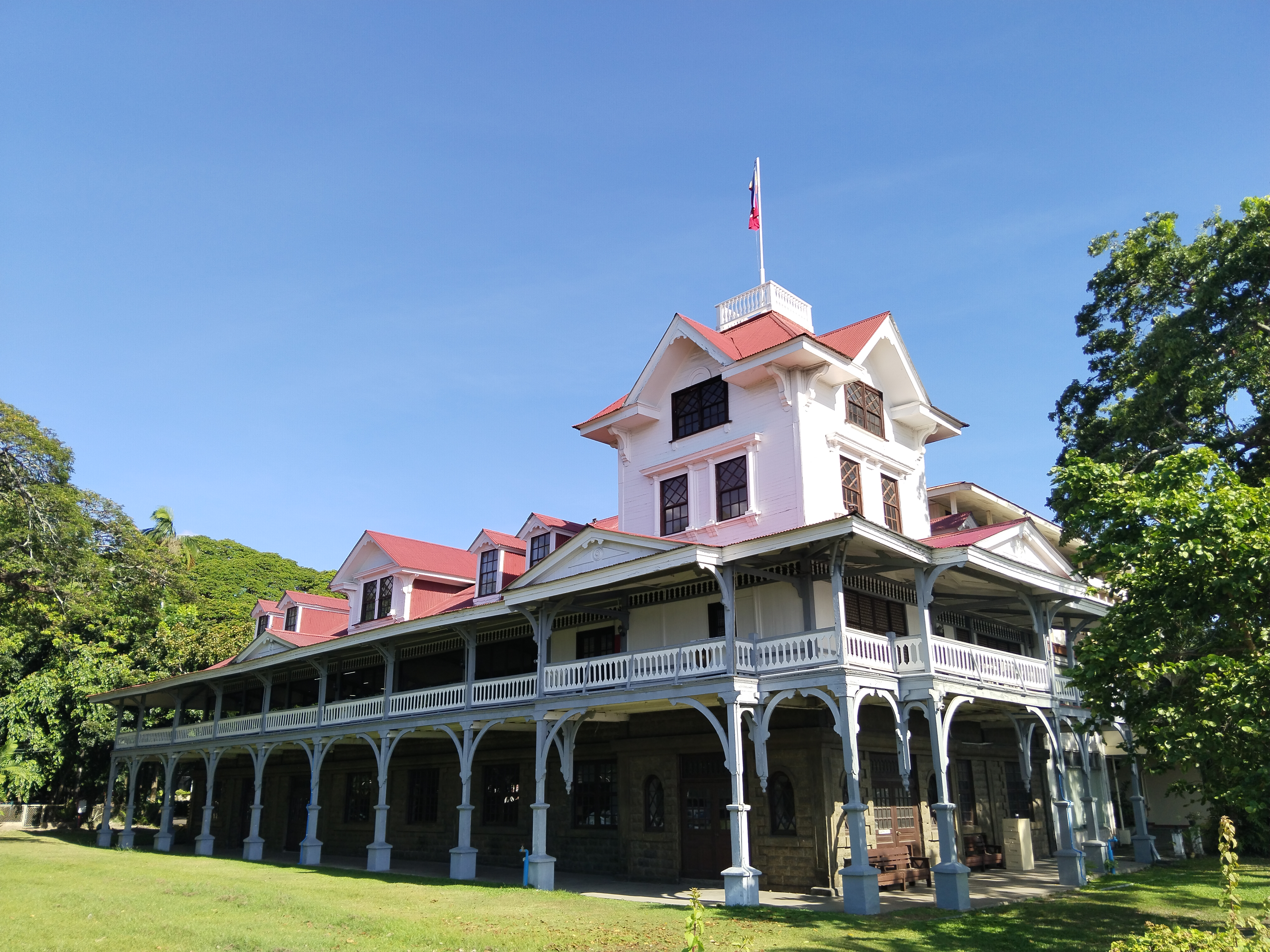
Dumaguete is best known for Silliman University.

Dumaguete is a university city, also called the "center of learning in the South," due to the presence of well-known universities. Public elementary and high schools including Dumaguete Science High School, the regional science high school of Central Visayas, is governed by Dumaguete City Schools Division of DepEd.

- Silliman University (SU, 1901) is the dominant institution of higher learning in Dumaguete, providing the city with a university town atmosphere. It is the first Protestant university in the country and the first American university in Asia. The 610,000 square metres (6,600,000 sq ft) campus is adjacent to and intermixed with the city's downtown district. Some of its buildings have likewise been recognized as landmarks, including the Silliman Hall, Hibbard Hall, Katipunan Hall, the Luce Auditorium, and the Silliman Main Library (considered one of the biggest libraries in the Philippines). CHED designated the Center of Excellence for its Nursing, Teacher Education, Marine Science and Information Technology, and the Center of Development for its Anthropology, Biology, Accountancy, and Medical Technology programs.
- Foundation University (FU, 1949) is a private non-sectarian university with its Main Campus located at Miciano Road, offering tertiary education programs, while the North Campus along Locsin Street is the home of Foundation Preparatory Academy for its basic education programs.
- Negros Oriental State University (NORSU, 1907) is the premier state university in Dumaguete City and Negros Oriental, with two main campuses in the city. The Main Campus 1 is beside the Provincial Capitol building, while the Main Campus 2 is located in barangay Bajumpandan. It offers affordable yet high quality education making it a top choice for students seeking excellence in various fields. NORSU specializes in engineering, information technology, teacher education, allied health sciences, business and agriculture. It is the first academic institution in the country to offer a BS in Geothermal Engineering. CHED designated the Center of Development for its Teacher Education program.
- St. Paul University Dumaguete (SPUD, 1904) is a prestigious Catholic institution founded in 1904 by the Sisters of St. Paul of Chartres from France. It is one the top universities in Dumaguete and the first St. Paul educational institution to be established in the Philippines known for its strong academic programs, values-based education and excellent campus facilities. SPUD excels in nursing, business, teacher education, and music programs duly recognized by the CHED as a fully autonomous Higher Education Institution (HEI). It is one of the seven campuses comprising the St. Paul University System.
- Colegio de Santa Catalina de Alejandria (COSCA, 1959) run by Catholic Diocesan clergy is located beside the Dumaguete Cathedral Church. Formerly known as Dumaguete Cathedral College, it offers pre-school to college programs. Its flagship courses are Commerce/Business Administration, Criminology, and Radiologic Technology.
- Metro Dumaguete College (MDC, 2002) is an academic institution with a campus in Barangay Daro, offering a Senior High School program, laddered TESDA accredited Technical Vocational programs, and other 4-year college courses.
- Asian College (formerly Asian Institute of Electronics and Asian College of Science and Technology) is a CHED and TESDA-accredited private tertiary educational institution in the Philippines founded in 1972. It has campuses in Quezon City and Dumaguete. It also offers DepEd and TESDA-certified senior high school.

== Sister cities ==
Dumaguete has the following sister cities:

=== Local ===
- Bacolod, Negros Occidental
- Mandaue, Cebu
- Butuan, Agusan del Norte
- Makati, Metro Manila
- San Juan, Metro Manila

=== International ===
- (South Korea) Yeongdong County of North Chungcheong, Republic of Korea
- Alameda of California, United States
