= Guess (company) =

American clothing line brand

Guess?, Inc.

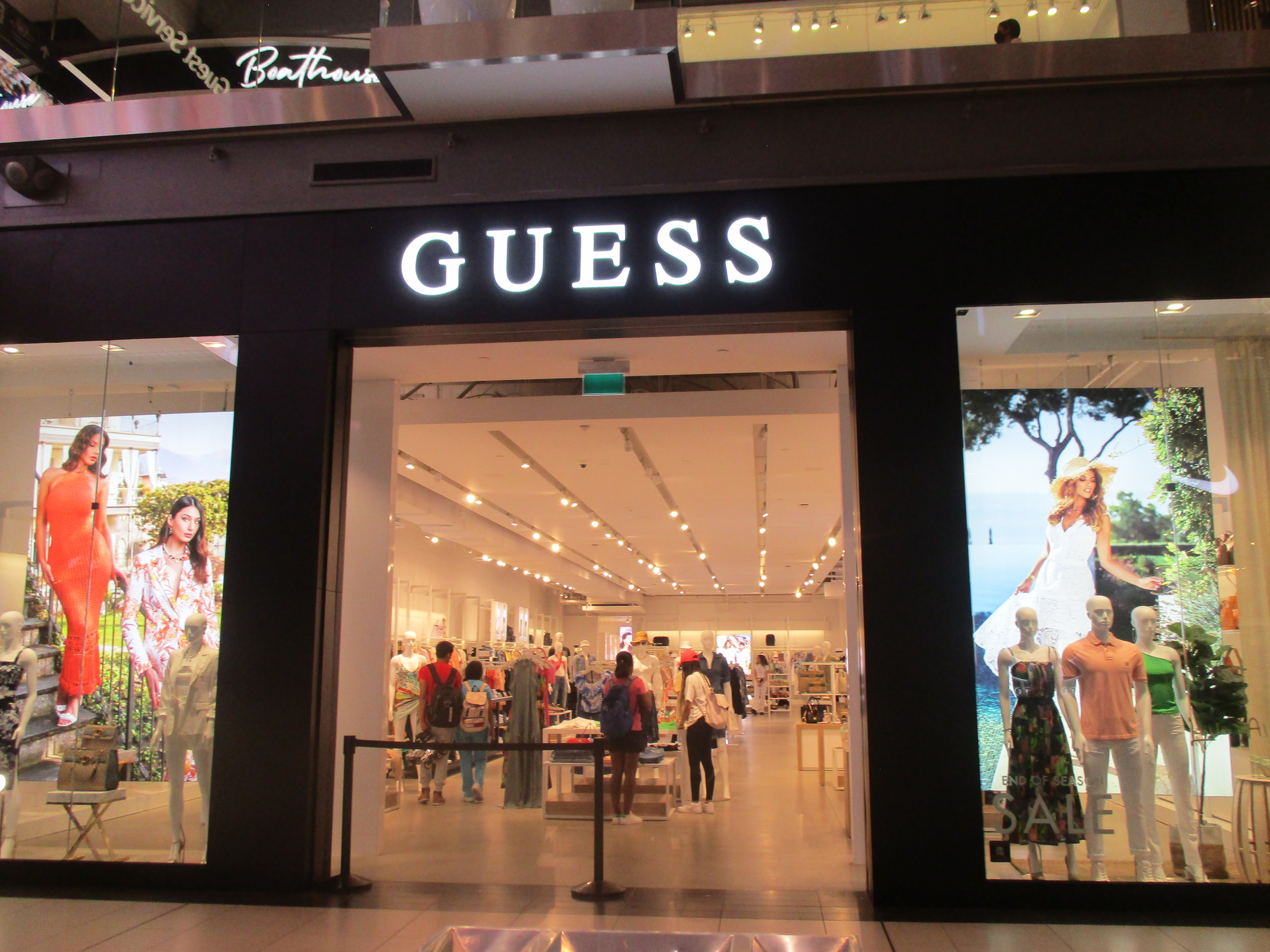
- Type: Private
- Traded as: NYSE: GES
- Industry: Fashion
- Founded: 1981; 45 years ago
- Founders: Georges Marciano; Maurice Marciano; Paul Marciano; Armand Marciano
- Headquarters: Los Angeles, California, U.S.
- Number of locations: 1,597 (2025)
- Key people: Carlos Alberini (CEO); Alex Yemenidjian (Chairperson); Paul Marciano (CCO); Alexander Grujicic (Head Designer)
- Products: Clothing, accessories
- Revenue: ▲US$2.99 billion (2025)
- Operating income: ▼US$174 million (2025)
- Net income: ▼US$60.4 million (2025)
- Total assets: ▲US$2.77 billion (2025)
- Total equity: ▼US$505 million (2025)
- Owner: Authentic Brands Group (51%)
- Number of employees: c. 13,000 (2025)
- Website: guess.com

Guess?, Inc. (styled as GUESS or Guess?) is an American clothing company, notable for its black-and-white advertisements. It licenses its brand on other fashion accessories, such as watches, jewelry, perfumes, bags and shoes.

Operating in several countries around the world, most of its stores are in the USA and Canada.

== History ==
=== 20th century ===
The Guess emblem with the question mark in the center

Guess began in 1981 as a book of styles started by Moroccan fashion designers Georges, Maurice, Armand, and Paul Marciano. The brothers switched to selling jeans with a light, form-fitting denim and zippers at the ankles. Guess began offering licensed products, including watches, eyewear, and a fragrance line.

In 1985, it introduced black-and-white advertisements, which went on to win numerous design awards. Its fashion models have included a number of supermodels, many of whom first achieved prominence via these ad campaigns. In the 1985 Robert Zemeckis movie, Back to the Future, Marty McFly (Michael J Fox) wore Guess's denim clothing.

Georges had wanted to sell Guess products in only the more exclusive stores, such as Bloomingdale's, while the other brothers decided on a broader distribution strategy, which included discount stores. Georges continued to oppose the idea of marketing Guess products beyond luxury retail outlets, and different alliances formed within the company.

Georges abruptly sold his stake in the company to his brothers in September 1993, for $214.2 million. To finance the purchase, the remaining three brothers borrowed $210 million, and $105 million was still outstanding three years later. To raise money, the brothers took Guess public in July 1996.

By the end of the 1990s, sales dropped and Guess reduced its expansion plans to concentrate on improving investment returns.

=== 21st century ===
Marciano brand extension

On January 26, 2001, Guess Inc. restated previous results for fiscal year 2000 after writing down impaired inventory. In 2004, the accessories department was greatly expanded and several stores across the US were redesigned. Guess also created a lower priced collection sold exclusively through its outlet locations, and introduced its first brand extension, the upscale female line of clothing and accessories, named Marciano.

Guess continued its Guess Kids clothing line in the early 21st century. In 2006, it began promoting the line through its factory retail stores. It continued to be guided by the Marciano brothers, as co-chairmen and co-CEOs. Maurice Marciano has overseen the design and its sales growth, while Paul managed the image and advertising.

In 2012, supermodel Claudia Schiffer posed for Guess's 30th anniversary, 23 years after her first posing for the brand. The following year, by being the face of their holiday campaign, Priyanka Chopra became the first Indian to represent the brand on a global scale.

After Camila Cabello was announced as the new face of Guess in 2017, Jennifer Lopez became its new face the following year. In February 2019, four years after Victor Herrero replaced Paul Marciano in the role, Carlos Alberini was selected as his successor as CEO.

In August 2025, it was announced that the company had gone private after Authentic Brands, Alberini, and brothers Maurice and Paul Marciano agreed to buy 51% of Guess's IP in a transaction valued at $1.4 billion. Previously, it had considered an offer with a lower valuation made in April by WHP Global.

When it was announced that the purchase of Guess had been completed in January 2026, its management continued to operate the business following the transaction. Guess went private and delisted from the New York Stock Exchange. The newly structured company opened a flagship store in West Hollywood as a 'Homecoming' concept store.

In November 2024 and February 2026, the company gathered attention for doing catwalks in the Alpine resort of Gstaad at the height of winter, the first of which was at 3000m and one of the highest catwalks in the world and hence described as one of the first of its kind

== Controversies ==
=== Worker conditions ===
During the 1980s, Guess was accused of using underground sweatshop contractors in Los Angeles. Initially, the company threatened to close or move its operations in factories where employers complained of sweatshop practices. In 1992, Guess contractors faced litigation from the US Department of Labor (DOL) due to failure to pay their employees the minimum wage or adequate overtime. Rather than face a court case, $573,000 in back wages were paid to employees. The company also agreed to be subjected to a voluntary monitoring agreement with DOL to prevent sweatshop practices among its subcontractors. Guess earned a place on the labor department's 'Trendsetters List', but this position was suspended several years later in 1996 after independent inspectors found violations of regulations at seven of the company's contractors.

In the same year, the company was sued by the Union of Needletrades, Industrial and Textile Employees (UNITE), again due to the failure to pay the minimum wage or overtime to workers. The settlement, supervised by the US Department of Labor, saw the reinstatement of eight workers found to have been illegally fired and another $80,000 in back pay given to workers. Almost immediately after the settlement, Guess announced that it was moving its sewing production to Mexico. The company denied that the move was related to these court cases, but its public image continued to suffer.

Throughout the 1990s, UNITE continued a public relations campaign against Guess, focusing on the experiences of former employees. Billboards subsequently appeared in Las Vegas, Los Angeles, and New York City featuring a photograph of Rage Against the Machine with the caption "Rage Against Sweatshops: We Don't Wear Guess – A Message from Rage Against The Machine and UNITE. Injustice. Don't buy it." Eventually, Guess countered with a defamation suit against UNITE and several of its officials, while in 1997 the company ran full-page ads in many major American newspapers claiming that its contractors were "guaranteed 100% free of sweatshop labour". The wording of these ads was changed after federal authorities complained that the claims had not been made by anyone in the government and had no official status.

In December 2023, a report funded by the Progressive Alliance of Socialists and Democrats in the European Parliament identified links between a Chinese supplier for Guess and forced labor involving the Uyghur minority.

=== "Ski Colombia" T-shirts ===
In 2005, Guess pulled a line of T-shirts from the market after Erika Becker-Medina, a D.C. area resident and government employee, spearheaded a campaign calling for the boycott of the company. "Ski Colombia: Always Plenty of Fresh Powder" was embossed on the T-shirts which were released by the company in the second quarter of 2005, apparently in reference to Colombia's drug-trafficking problem. Guess distributed letters of apology.

=== Gucci logo infringement ===
In 2009, Italian luxury brand Gucci accused Guess of counterfeiting and trademark infringement on the Gucci logo and the interlocking G's which appear on pairs of Guess shoes. In 2012, Gucci was awarded $4.7 million in damages; originally, the Italian brand had asked for $221 million.

=== Operations in Russia following the 2022 invasion of Ukraine ===
Guess faced criticism for its continued business operations in Russia following the 2022 invasion of Ukraine. Despite the international push for companies to cease their business in Russia, Guess has maintained its operations within the country. In May 2023, it was revealed that Guess had bought a 30% stake in its Russian partner, Vyacheslav Shikulov's local business, with approval from the U.S. Department of the Treasury. This move raised concerns regarding the brand's commitment to halting its presence in Russia, particularly as its sales and profits in Russia saw an increase in 2022 compared to the previous year.

The brand has had a significant Ukrainian contingent in the 2020’s, including photographers Vicoolya & Saida and Alina Troyan who have done several significant shoots for the brands, including viral ones involving Matteo Bocelli, Oriola Marashi and Nadine Mirada, and there are also influential Ukrainian models for the brand such as Liza Makhu and Violetta Seleznova

=== Operations in Israeli settlements in the West Bank ===
During the early 2020s, Guess expanded its presence in the Middle East, notably in Israel through its franchise and licensing partner, Delta Galil Industries. This expansion included the May 2021 opening of a flagship store in Haifa's Grand Canyon Mall. However, this partnership has drawn scrutiny from human rights activists due to Delta Galil's operations in Israeli settlements in the West Bank. Delta Galil was included in the 2020 United Nations database of business enterprises involved in activities related to settlements, a listing that was reaffirmed in subsequent UN updates in 2023 and 2025.

=== Street artist lawsuit ===
In 2022, Banksy posted on Instagram and encouraged his fans to steal items from a Guess clothing store, alleging the company used his images without permission. He stated: "They've helped themselves to my artwork without asking, how can it be wrong for you to do the same to their clothes?" The company said the collection was created in collaboration with Brandalised, which licenses designs by graffiti artists.

In 2024, a lawsuit was filed against Guess, accusing the brand of stealing the intellectual property of several street artists for its "graffiti inspired" clothing line. The suit was filed in California's Central District and concerns Guess's alleged use of the tags of both Sean Griffin ("Nekst") and Robin Ronn ("Bates").

=== AI photoshoot ===
In spite of the image that the brand projects with its photoshoots, they caused controversy in August 2025 by publishing an advert in Vogue where the models were AI-generated. Seraphinne Vallora generated the advert. Its founders, Valentina Gonzalez and Andreea Petrescu, said they were recruited by Paul Marciano, on Instagram and were asked to create an AI model as part of the brand's summer campaign and defended the photoshoot by saying "We created 10 draft models for him and he selected one brunette woman and one blonde that we went ahead and developed further”.

Guess sneaker animation

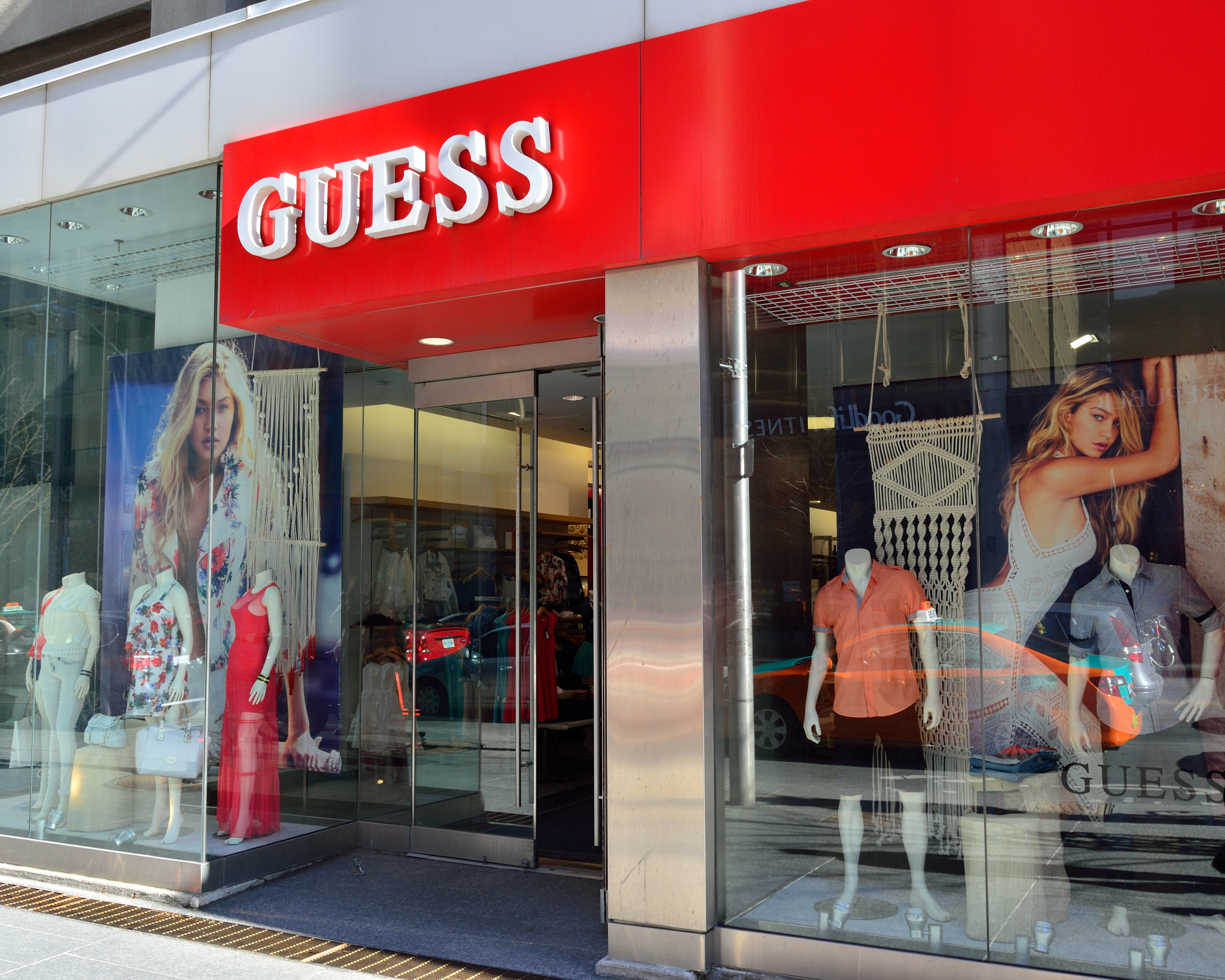
Guess store in Toronto
