= List of Miss France titleholders =

Miss France is a French beauty pageant that has been held annually since 1947.

== Titleholders ==
The Miss France competition was founded in 1920, using the name La plus belle femme de France (English: The most beautiful woman of France). After two editions, the competition was abandoned, and later rebranded as Miss France in 1927. Miss France was held annually until 1940, due to World War II, and has since been held annually again since 1947.

Year	Miss France	Hometown	Region	Age (Note: Ages at the time of Miss France)	Notes
La plus belle femme de France
1920	Agnès Souret	Espelette	Aquitaine	17	
1921	Pauline Pô	Ajaccio	Corsica	16	
Miss France
1927	Roberte Cusey	Paris	Franche-Comté	20	
1928	Raymonde Allain	Paris	Brittany	15	
1929	Madeleine Mourgues	Lot	(Languedoc-Roussillon) Languedoc	17	
1930	Yvette Labrousse	Oullins	Rhône-Alpes	24	
1931	Jeanne Juillia	Villeneuve-sur-Lot	Aquitaine	20	
1932	Lyne Quesson de Souza	Mouans-Sartoux	(Nice) Côte d'Azur	18	
1933	Jacqueline Bertin	Paris	Île-de-France	16	
1934	Simone Barillier	Paris	Île-de-France	17	
1935	Elisabeth Pitz	Saarbrücken	(Saar Protectorate) Saar (Note: Until 1935, Saarbrücken was part of the Territory of the Saar Basin, a region of Germany that was administered by the United Kingdom and France under the control of the League of Nations.)	24	Pitz resigned two hours after being crowned Miss France amidst controversy that the Territory of the Saar Basin had become German territory four months prior to the competition. She was replaced by Préville, her first runner-up.
1935	Gisèle Préville	Paris	Île-de-France	16	Pitz resigned two hours after being crowned Miss France amidst controversy that the Territory of the Saar Basin had become German territory four months prior to the competition. She was replaced by Préville, her first runner-up.
1936	Lynne Lassal	Paris	Picardy	18	
1937	Jacqueline Janet	Paris	Brittany	17	
1938	Annie Garrigues	Perpignan	Roussillon	18	
1939	Ginette Catriens	Paris	Île-de-France	24	
1940	Joséphine Ladwig	Bischwiller	Alsace	16	
No competition held in 1941 - 1946
1947	Yvonne Viseux	Camon	(Nice) Côte d'Azur	20	
1948	Jacqueline Donny	Paris	Île-de-France	20	
1949	Juliette Figueras	Paris	Île-de-France	20	
1950	Maryse Delort	Paris	Île-de-France	19	
1951	Nicole Drouin	Paris	(Nice) Côte d'Azur	20	
1952	Josiane Pouy	Nérac	Aquitaine	18	
1953	Sylviane Carpentier	Ailly-sur-Somme	Picardy	19	
1954	Irène Tunc	Nice	(Nice) Côte d'Azur	19	
1955	Véronique Zuber	Paris	Île-de-France	19	
1956	Gisèle Charbit	Casablanca	Morocco (Note: Until 1956, Morocco was under control of France as the French Protectorate in Morocco.)	18	
1957	Sylvie-Rosine Numez	Saint-Étienne	Rhône-Alpes		
1958	Monique Negler		Normandy		
1959	Monique Chiron		Poitou-Charentes	17	
1960	Brigitte Barazer de Lannurien		Brittany	16	
1961	Michèle Wargnier	Paris	Brittany	17	
1962	Monique Lemaire		Brittany	18	2nd runner-up at Miss World 1962 and Top 15 at Miss Universe 1963
1963	Muguette Fabris	Angoulême	Île-de-France	22	5th runner-up at Miss World 1963
1964	Arlette Collot	Clomot	Burgundy	21	Collot was dethroned in August 1964, after refusing to travel throughout France as part of her official duties, and replaced by Gayraud, her first runner-up.
1964	Jacqueline Gayraud		Pays de la Loire		Top 16 at Miss World 1964
1965	Christiane Sibellin	Lyon	Rhône-Alpes	16	Top 16 at Miss World 1965
1966	Michèle Boulé	Cannes	(Nice) Côte d'Azur	17	Top 15 at Miss World 1966
1967	Jeanne Beck	Saint-Pierre-du-Mont	Normandy	19	
1968	Christiane Lillio	Terrenoire	Rhône-Alpes	16	
1969	Suzanne Angly	Mulhouse	Alsace	17	Top 15 at Miss World 1969 Top 15 at Miss International 1972
1970	Michelle Beaurain	Paris	Île-de-France	19	
1971	Myriam Stocco	Beaucaire	(Languedoc-Roussillon) Languedoc	21	Top 12 at Miss Universe 1971 Top 7 at Miss World 1971
1972	Chantal Bouvier de la Motte	Paris	Île-de-France	17	Bouvier de la Motte suffered severe injuries after falling off of a horse, and resigned the title. She was replaced by Cassereau, her first runner-up.
1972	Claudine Cassereau	Loudun	Poitou-Charentes	19	
1973	Isabelle Nadia Krumacker	Troisfontaines	Lorraine	19	Top 15 at Miss International 1975
1974	Edna Tepava	Papeete	(French Polynesia) Tahiti	17	
1975	Sophie Perin	Talange	Lorraine	18	Miss International 1976
1976	Monique Uldaric	Saint-Pierre	Réunion	21	
1977	Véronique Fagot	Oiron	Poitou-Charentes	17	Top 15 at Miss World 1977
1978	Pascale Taurua	Nouméa	New Caledonia	16	Taurua resigned the title shortly after winning due to her wishing to remain in New Caledonia and not move to Paris; she was replaced by her first runner-up Brigitte Konjovic.
1978	Brigitte Konjovic	Paris	Île-de-France	17	
1979	Sylvie Hélène Marie Parera	Marseille	Provence	18	Top 10 at Miss International 1980
1980	Thilda Fuller	Papeete	(French Polynesia) Tahiti	24	Fuller resigned the title three days after winning and was replaced by her first runner-up Patricia Barzyk. Top 12 at Miss Universe 1980 representing Tahiti.
1980	Patricia Barzyk	Arbouans	Franche-Comté	16	2nd runner-up at Miss World 1980
1981	Isabelle Sophie Benard	Vernon	Normandy	18	
1982	Sabrina Belleval	Nice	(Nice) Côte d'Azur	16	
1983	Isabelle Turpault	Paris	Île-de-France	22	Turpault was dethroned after it was discovered that she had participated in an erotic photoshoot, and was replaced by her first runner-up Frédérique Marcelle Leroy.
1983	Frédérique Marcelle Leroy	Bordeaux	Aquitaine	20	
1984	Martine Robine	Deauville	Normandy	19	
1985	Suzanne Iskandar	Lingolsheim	Alsace	21	First Arab-French winner and first winner with dual nationality, being French-Lebanese
1986	Valérie Pascale	Paris	Île-de-France	17	
1987	Nathalie Marquay	Wittenheim	Alsace	19	Top 12 at Miss World 1987 Top 10 at Miss International 1988
1988	Sylvie Bertin	Ferney-Voltaire	Rhône-Alpes	21	
1989	Stephanie (Peggy) Zlotkowski	Monflanquin	Aquitaine	16	
1990	Gaëlle Voiry	Bordeaux	Aquitaine	21	
1991	Mareva Georges	Punaauia	(French Polynesia) Tahiti	21	Top 10 at Miss Universe 1991 Top 10 at Miss World 1991
1992	Linda Hardy	Nantes	Pays de la Loire	18	
1993	Véronique de la Cruz	Saint-François	Guadeloupe	18	Top 10 at Miss World 1993 First black titleholder
1994	Valérie Claisse	Pornic	Pays de la Loire	21	
1995	Mélody Vilbert	Bordeaux	Aquitaine	18	Top 10 at Miss International 1995
1996	Laure Belleville	Lathuile	Rhône-Alpes	19	
1997	Patricia Spehar	Lésigny	Île-de-France	21	Top 10 at Miss International 1998
1998	Sophie Thalmann	Bar-le-Duc	Lorraine	21	
1999	Mareva Galanter	Papeete	(French Polynesia) Tahiti	19	
2000	Sonia Rolland	Cluny	Burgundy	18	Top 10 at Miss Universe 2000
2001	Élodie Gossuin	Trosly-Breuil	Picardy	19	Miss Europe 2001 Top 10 at Miss Universe 2001
2002	Sylvie Tellier	Lyon	Rhône-Alpes	23	National director of the Miss France Company (2007–2022)
2003	Corinne Coman	Sainte-Anne	Guadeloupe	20	
2004	Lætitia Bléger	Saint-Hippolyte	Alsace	23	After her reign, Bléger posed in the French edition of Playboy, and had her title temporarily stripped from her until later reconciling.
2005	Cindy Fabre	Falaise	Normandy	18	National director of the Miss France Company (2022–2025)
2006	Alexandra Rosenfeld	Saint-Thibéry	(Languedoc-Roussillon) Languedoc	19	Miss Europe 2006
2007	Rachel Legrain-Trapani	Saint-Quentin	Picardy	18	
2008	Valérie Bègue	Saint-Leu	Réunion	23	After winning the title, suggestive photos of Bègue were released; after refusing to resign, a compromise was reached where she was able to keep her title but could not compete internationally or crown her successor.
2009	Chloé Mortaud	Bénac	Midi-Pyrénées	19	Top 10 at Miss Universe 2009 Top 7 at Miss World 2009
2010	Malika Ménard	Herouville-Saint-Clair	Normandy	22	Top 15 at Miss Universe 2010
2011	Laury Thilleman	Brest	Brittany	19	Top 10 at Miss Universe 2011
2012	Delphine Wespiser	Magstatt-le-Bas	Alsace	19	
2013	Marine Lorphelin	Charnay-lès-Mâcon	Burgundy	19	1st runner-up at Miss World 2013
2014	Flora Coquerel	Morancez	Centre-Val de Loire	19	Top 5 at Miss Universe 2015
2015	Camille Cerf	Coulogne	Nord-Pas-de-Calais	19	Top 15 at Miss Universe 2014
2016	Iris Mittenaere	Steenvoorde	Nord-Pas-de-Calais	22	Miss Universe 2016
2017	Alicia Aylies	Matoury	French Guiana	18	
2018	Maëva Coucke	Ferques	Nord-Pas-de-Calais	23	Top 12 at Miss World 2018 Top 10 at Miss Universe 2019
2019	Vaimalama Chaves	Mahina	(French Polynesia) Tahiti	24	
2020	Clémence Botino	Le Gosier	Guadeloupe	22	Top 10 at Miss Universe 2021 Top 40 at Miss World 2023
2021	Amandine Petit	Bourguébus	Normandy	23	Top 21 at Miss Universe 2020
2022	Diane Leyre	Paris	Île-de-France	24	
2023	Indira Ampiot	Basse-Terre	Guadeloupe	18	Top 30 at Miss Universe 2024 Top 12 and Top Model Winner at Miss World 2026
2024	Eve Gilles	Quaëdypre	Nord-Pas-de-Calais	20	Top 30 at Miss Universe 2025 1st runner-up at Miss Supranational 2026
2025	Angélique Angarni-Filopon	Fort-de-France	Martinique	34	
2026	Hinaupoko Devèze	Māhina	(French Polynesia) Tahiti	23	
2027					

=== Gallery ===
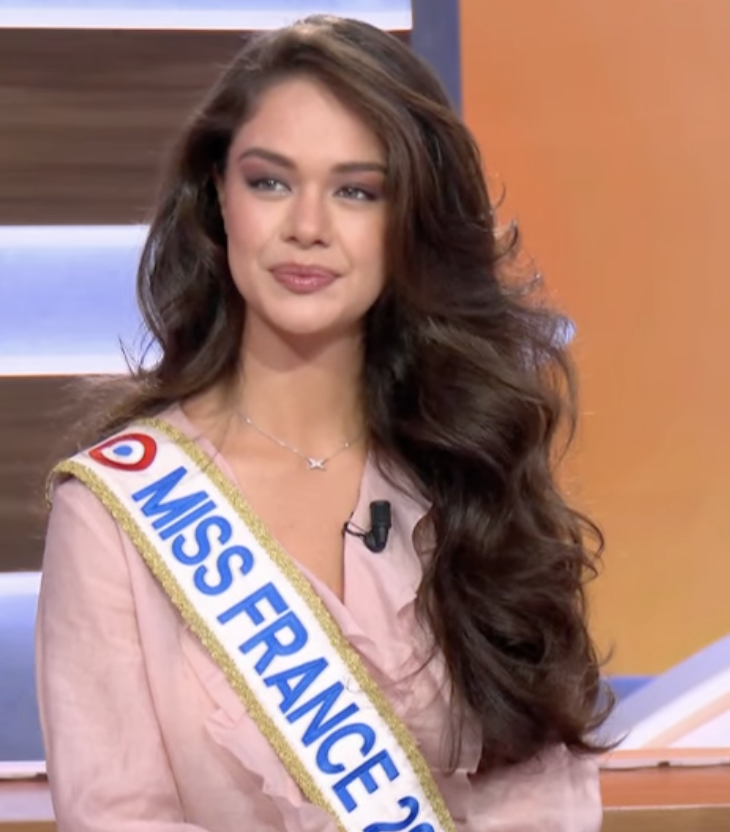
Miss France 2026
Hinaupoko Devèze

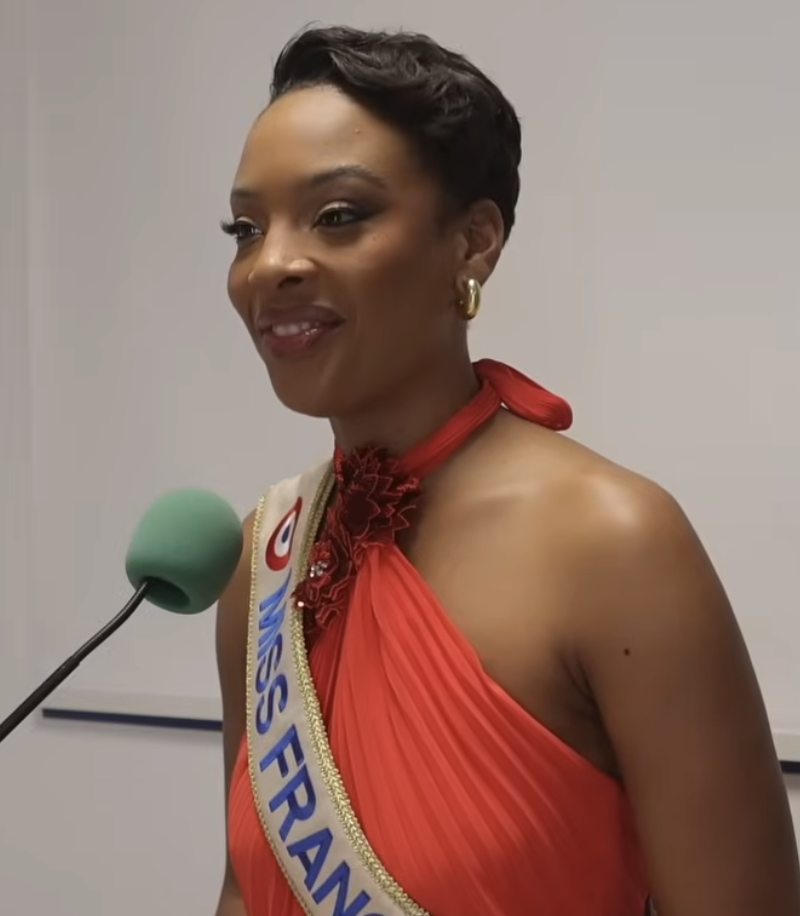
Miss France 2025
Angélique Angarni-Filopon

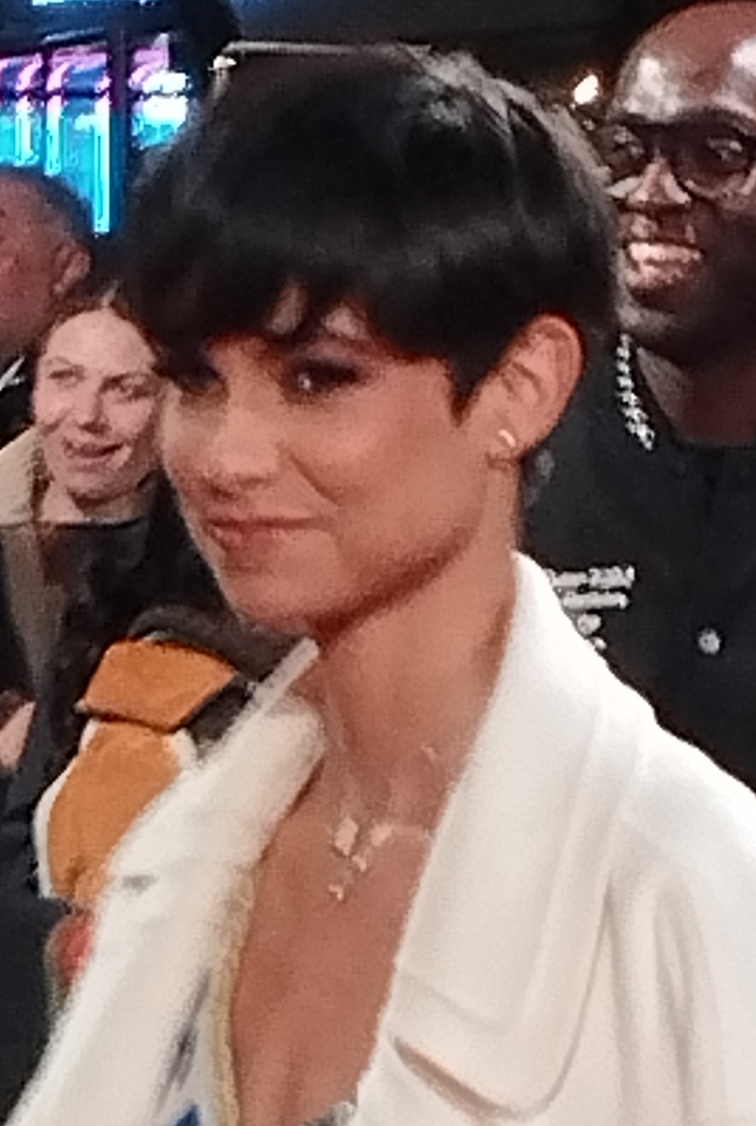
Miss France 2024
Eve Gilles

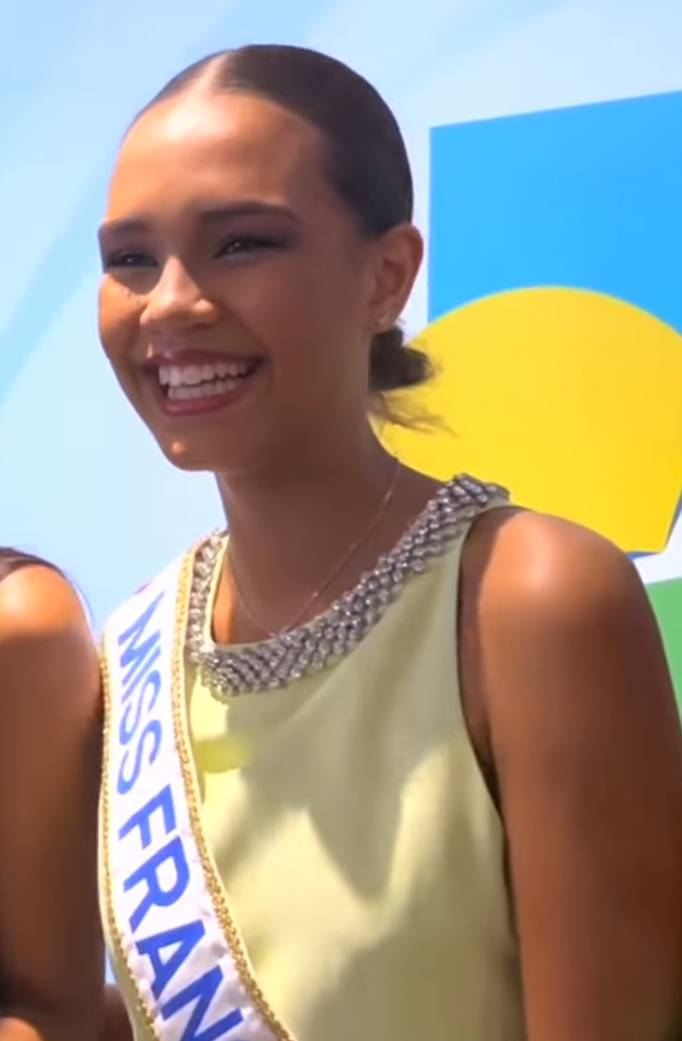
Miss France 2023
Indira Ampiot

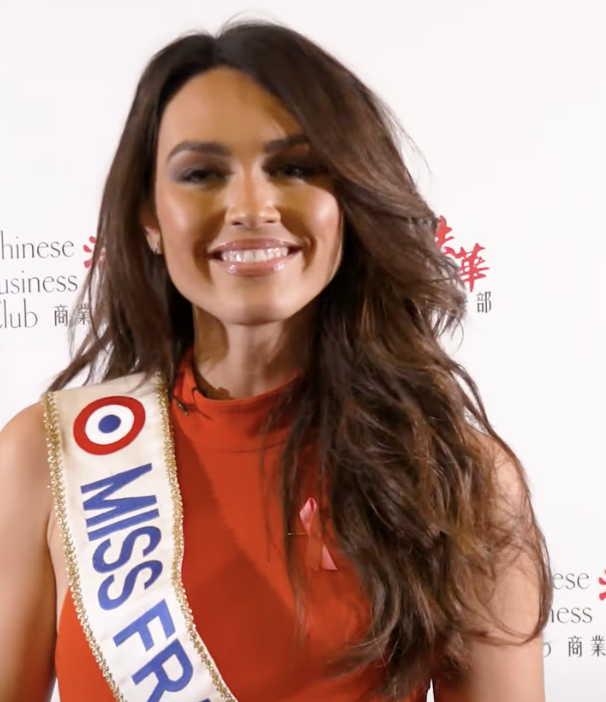
Miss France 2022
Diane Leyre

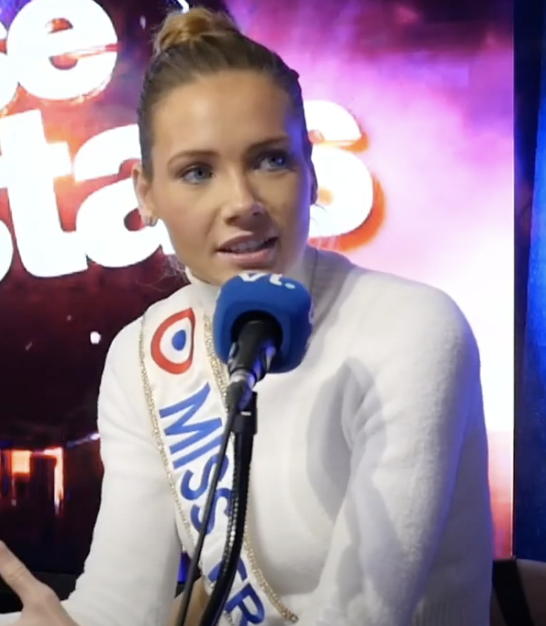
Miss France 2021
Amandine Petit

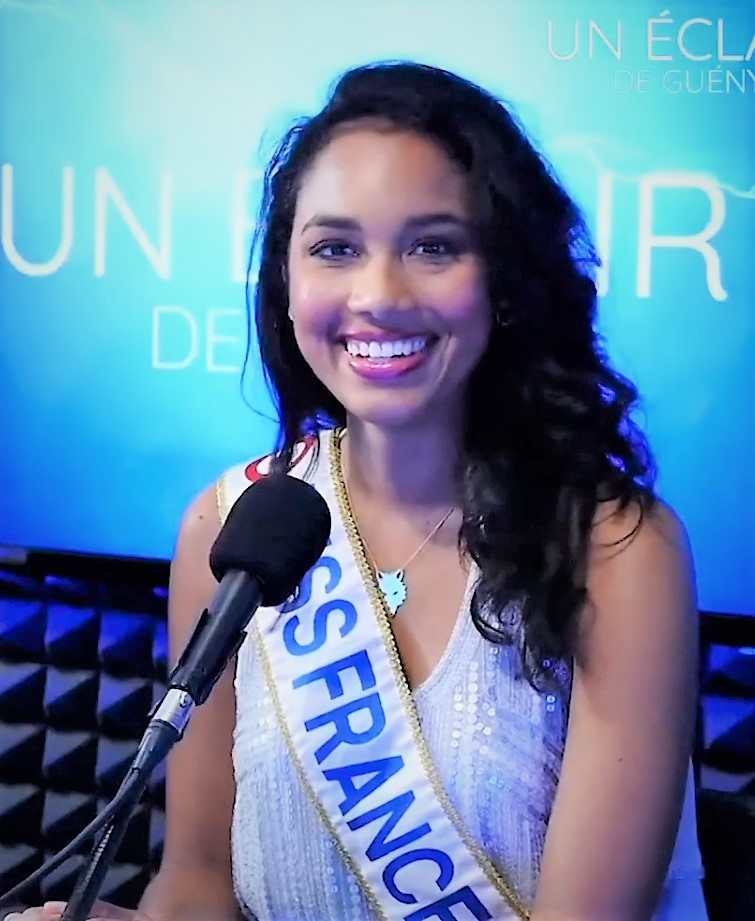
Miss France 2020
Clémence Botino

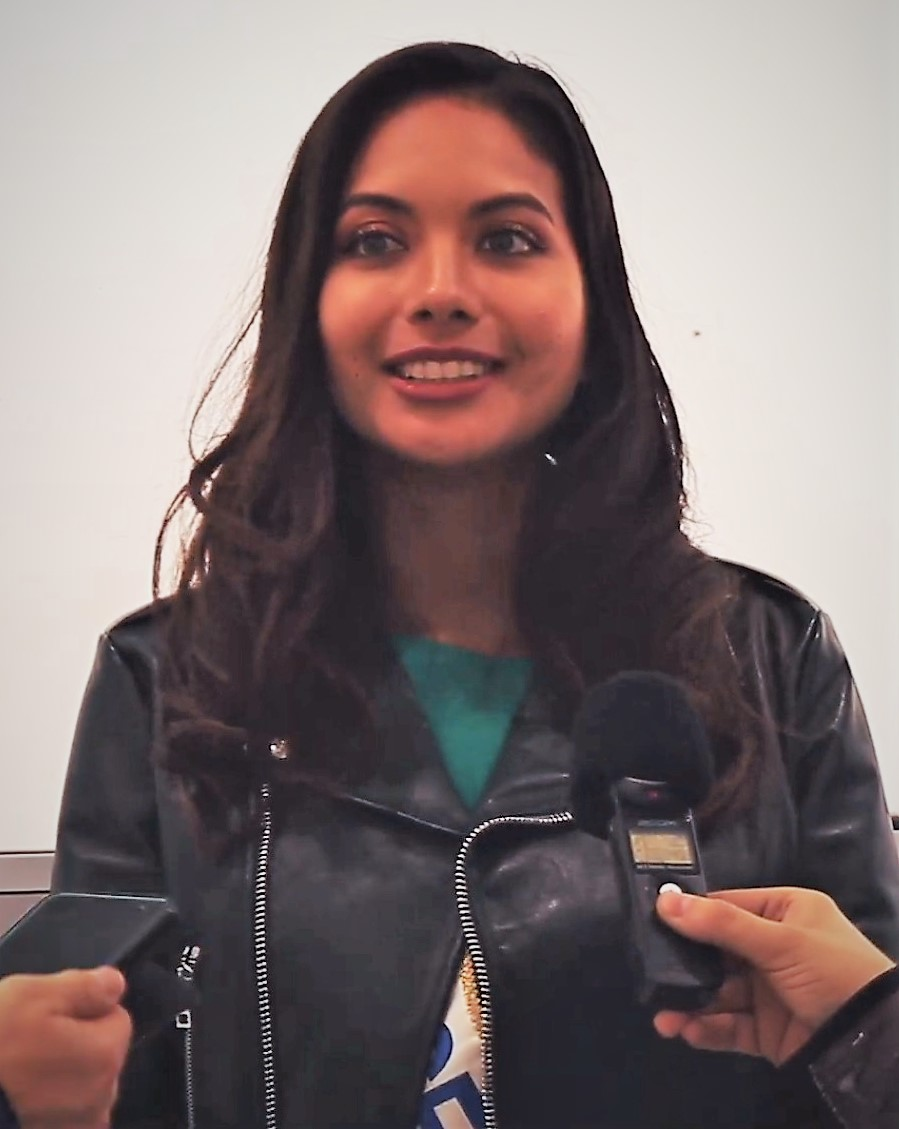
Miss France 2019
Vaimalama Chaves

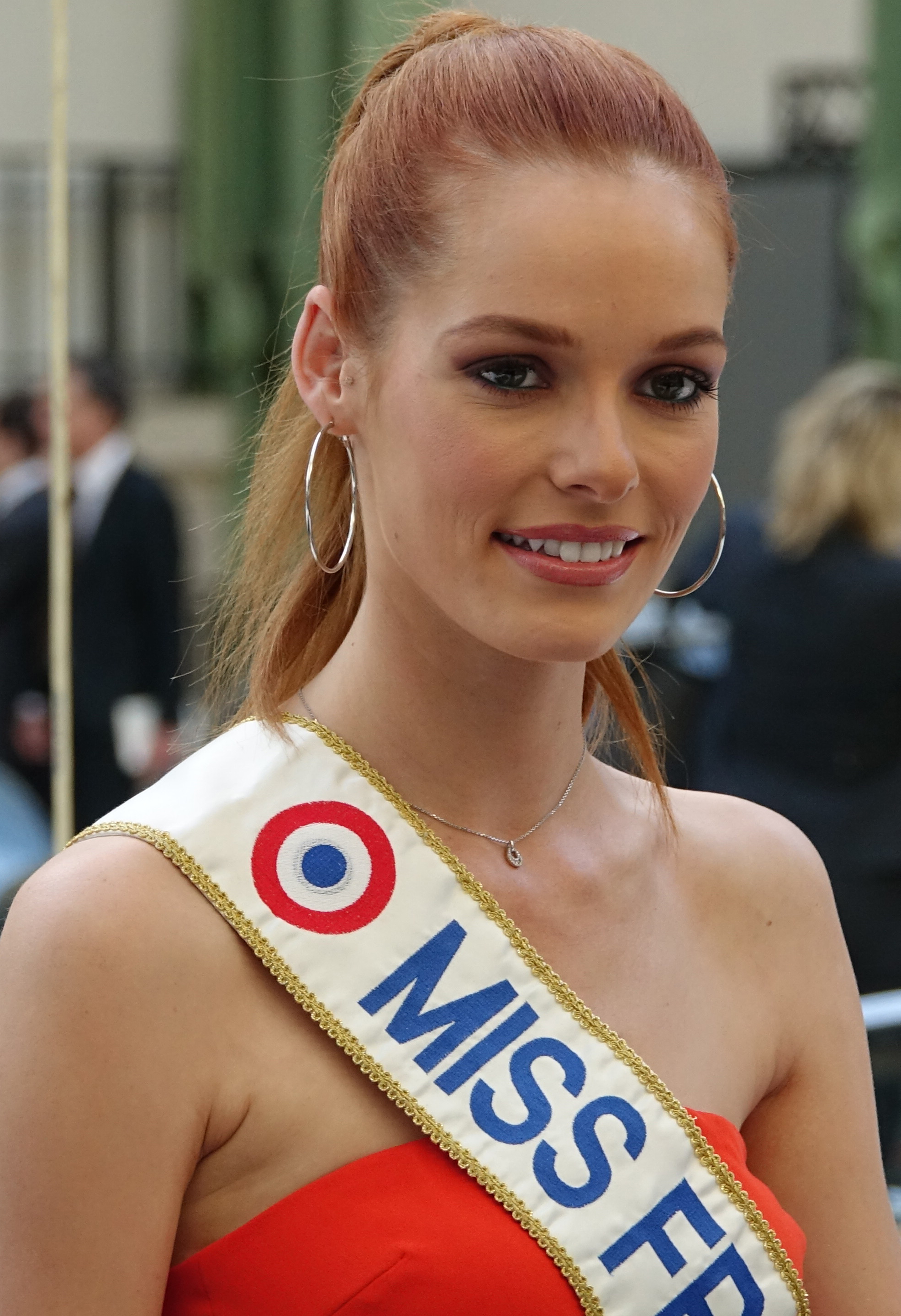
Miss France 2018
Maëva Coucke

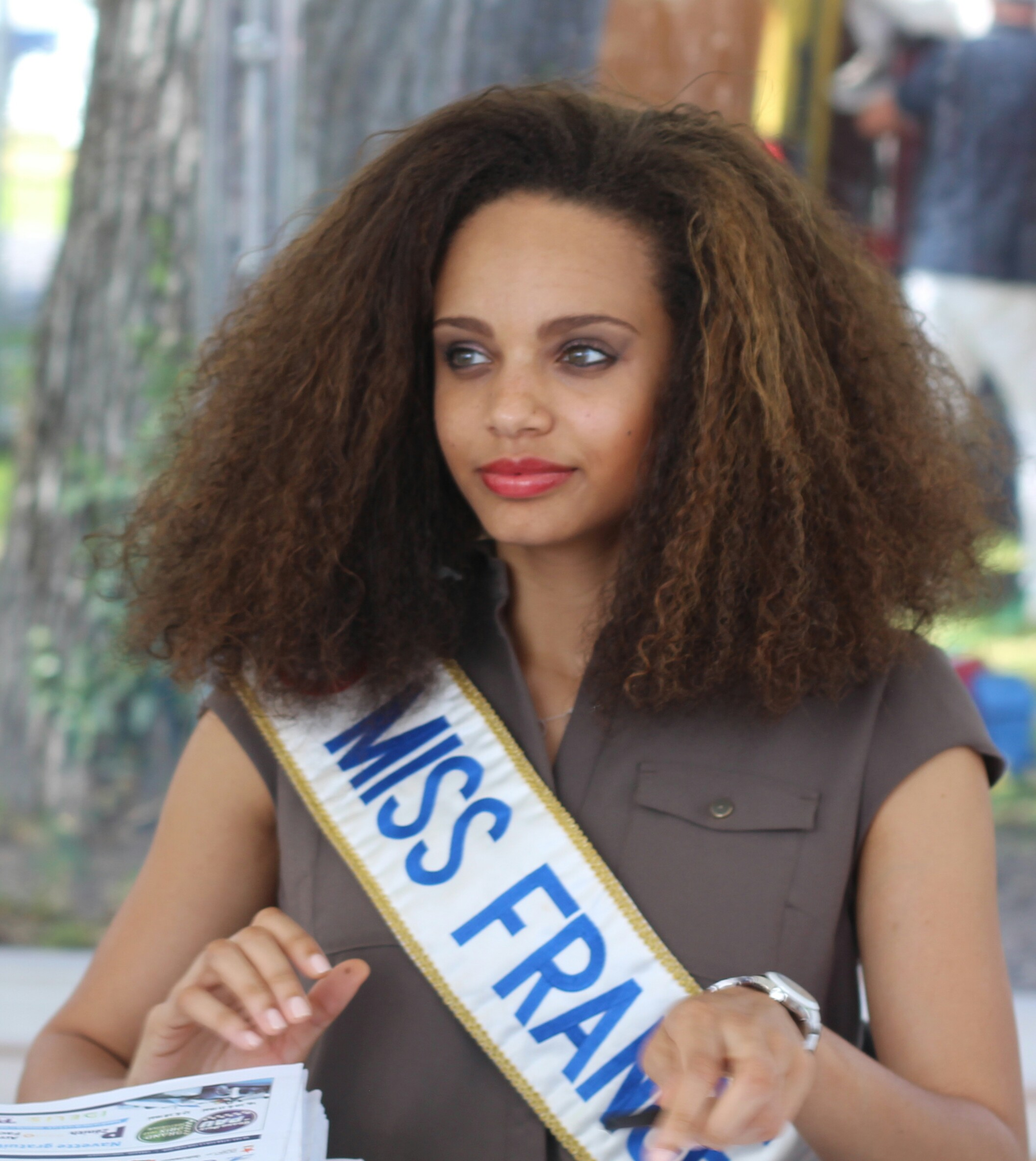
Miss France 2017
Alicia Aylies

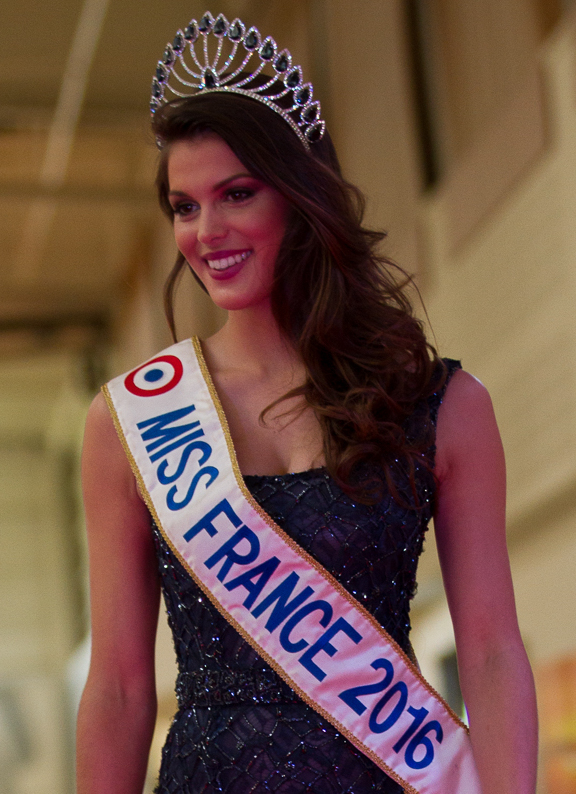
Miss France and Miss Universe 2016
Iris Mittenaere

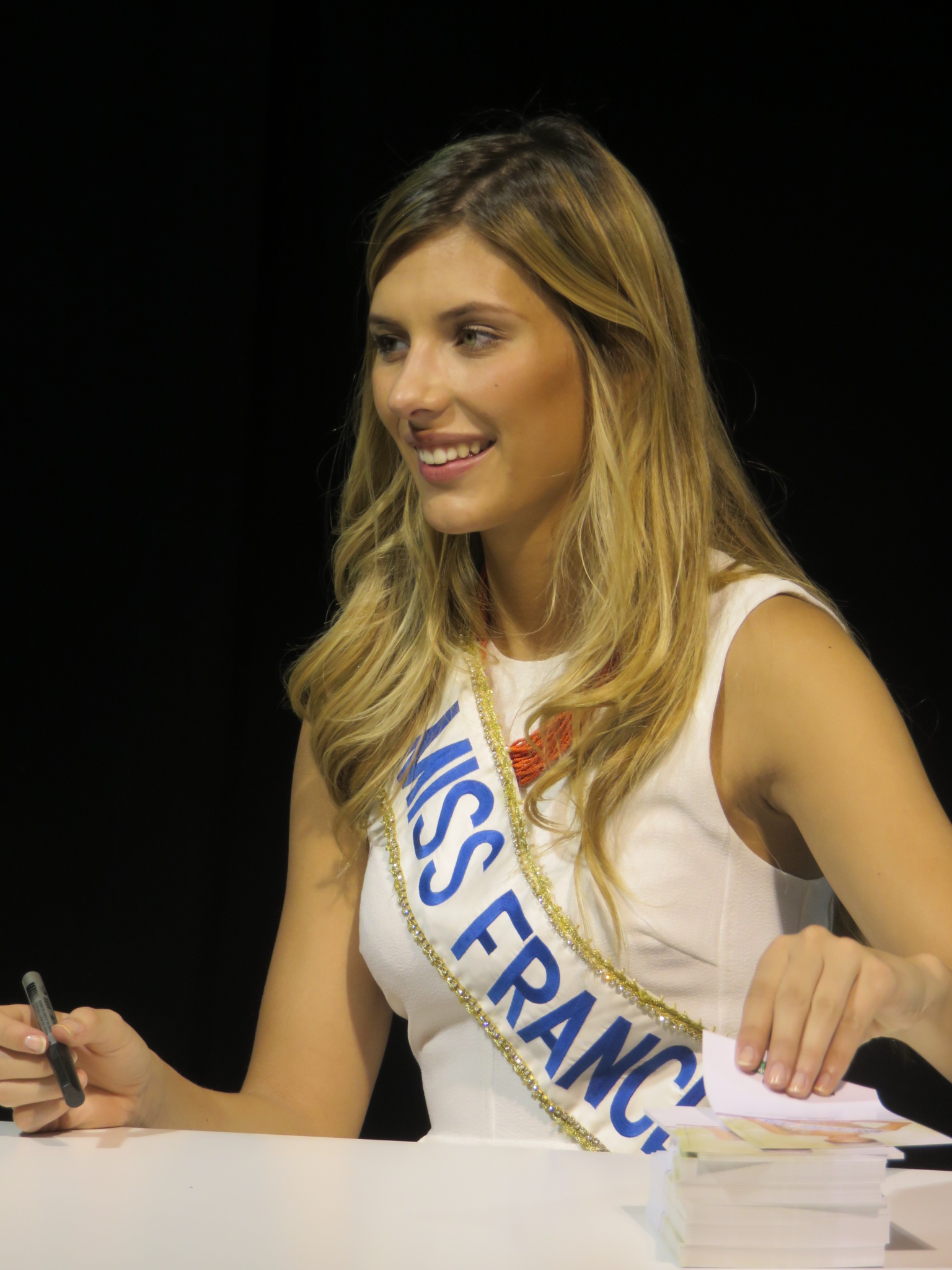
Miss France 2015
Camille Cerf

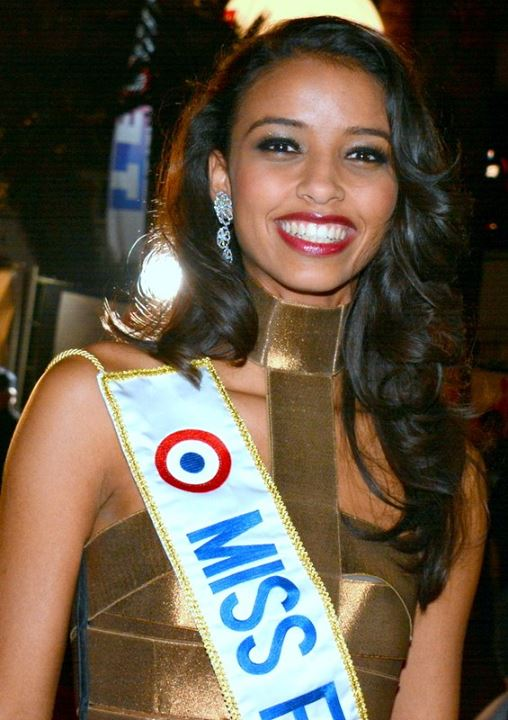
Miss France 2014
Flora Coquerel

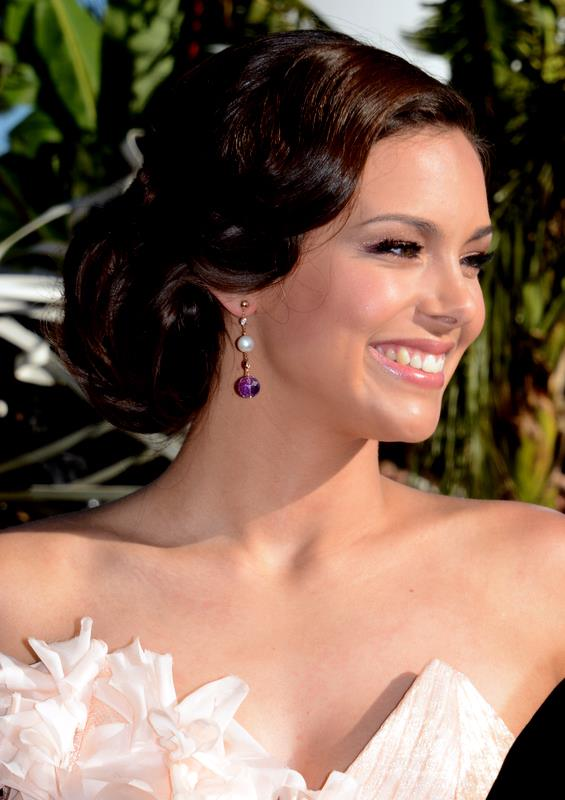
Miss France 2013
Marine Lorphelin

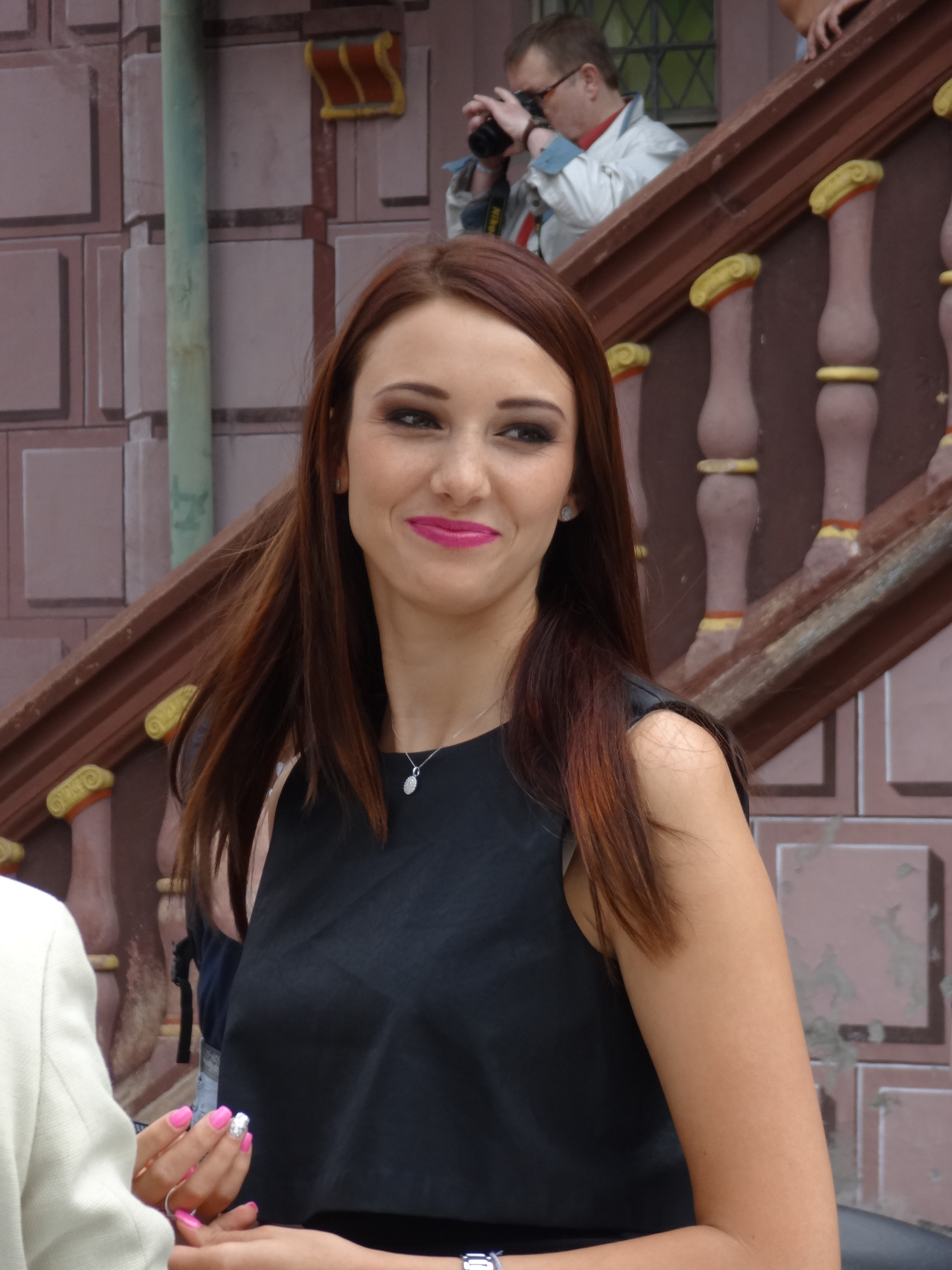
Miss France 2012
Delphine Wespiser

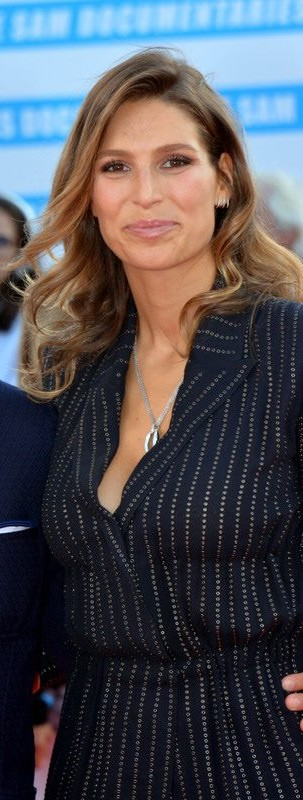
Miss France 2011
Laury Thilleman

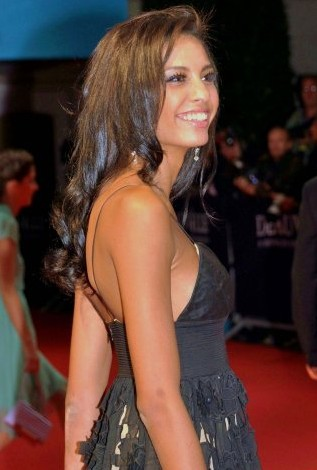
Miss France 2009
Chloé Mortaud

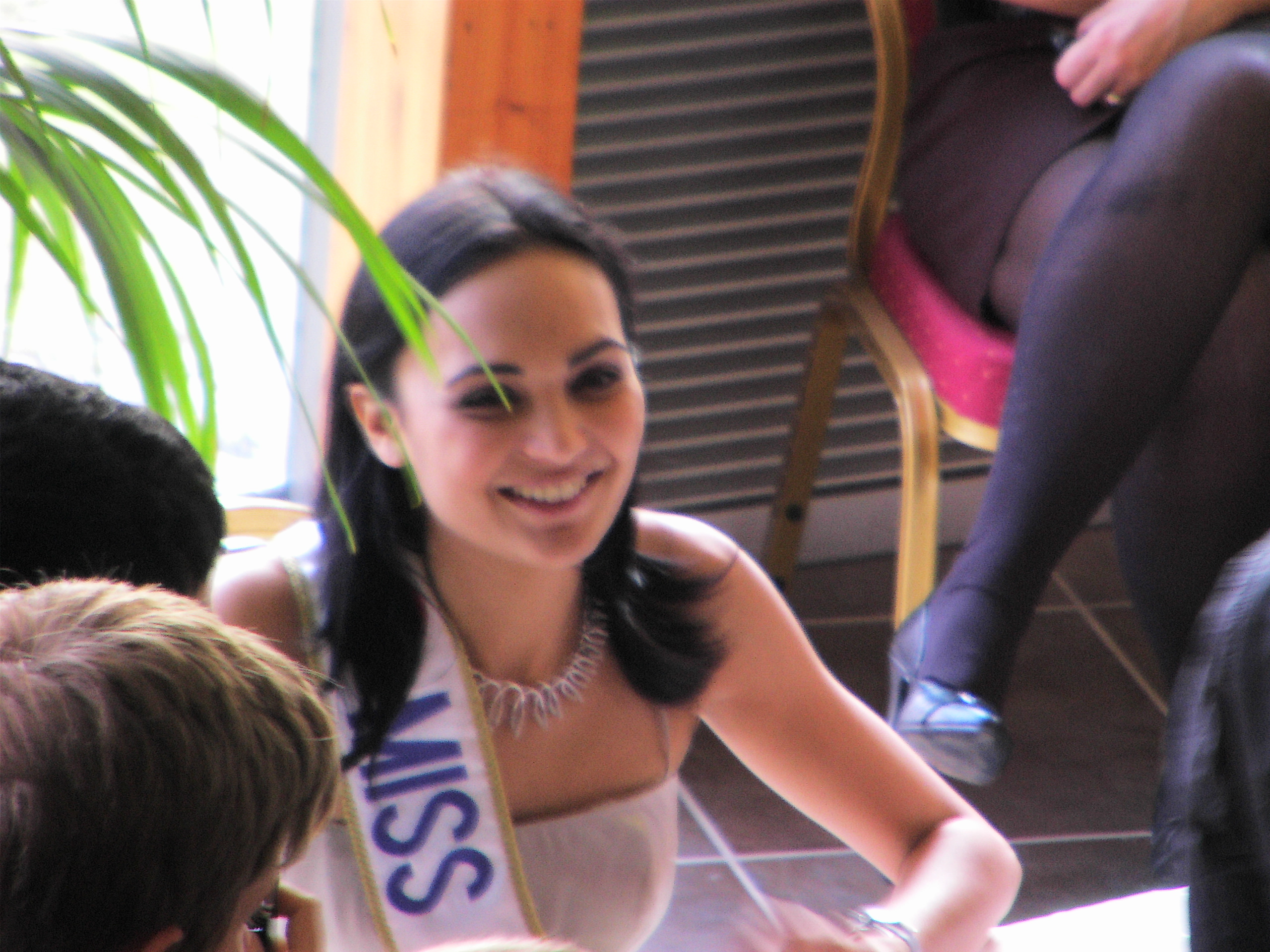
Miss France 2008
Valérie Bègue

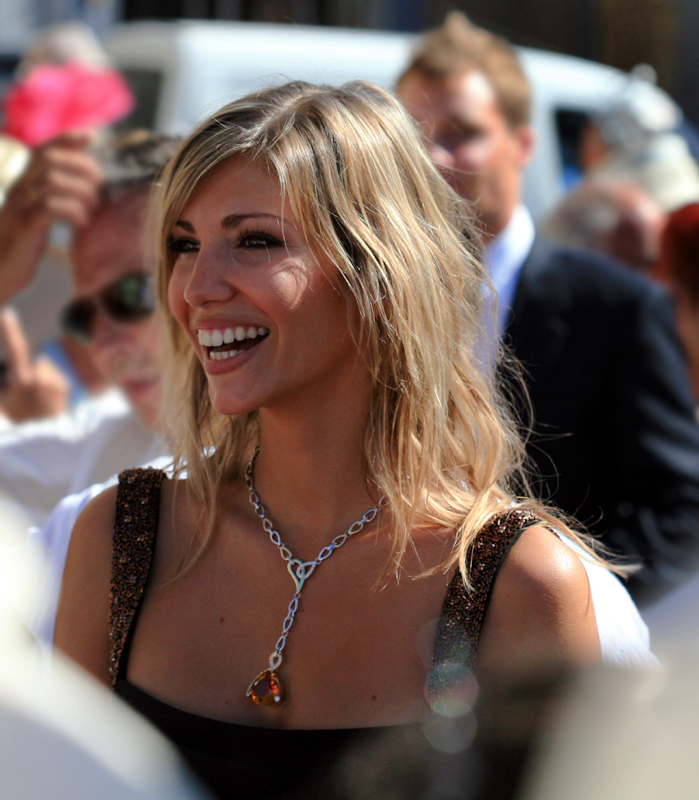
Miss France 2006 and Miss Europe 2006
Alexandra Rosenfeld

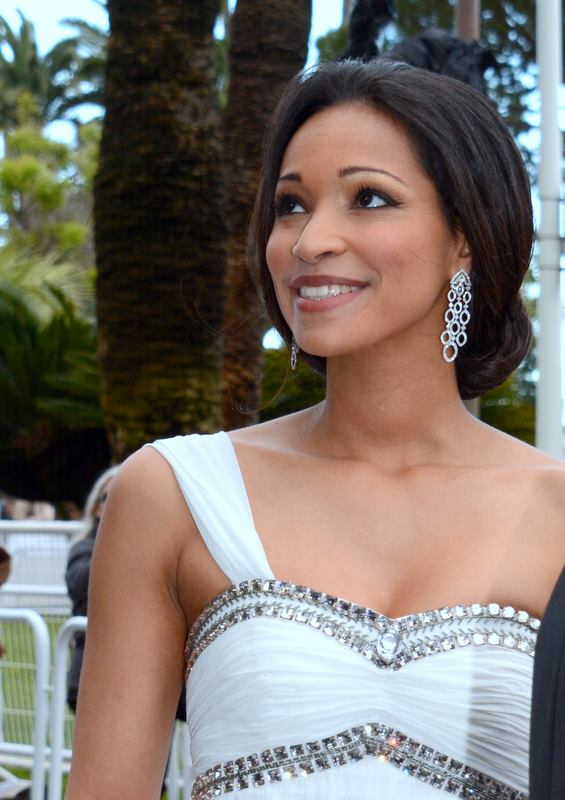
Miss France 2005
Cindy Fabre

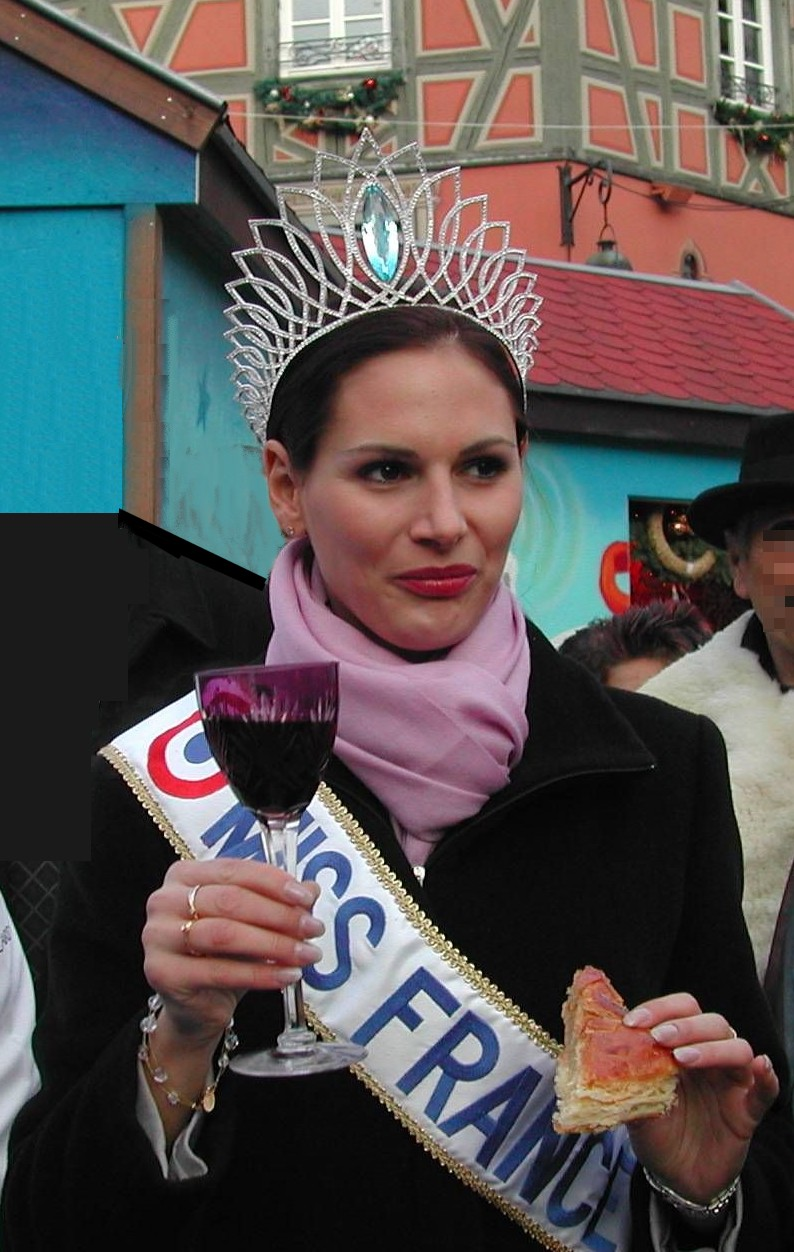
Miss France 2004
Lætitia Bléger

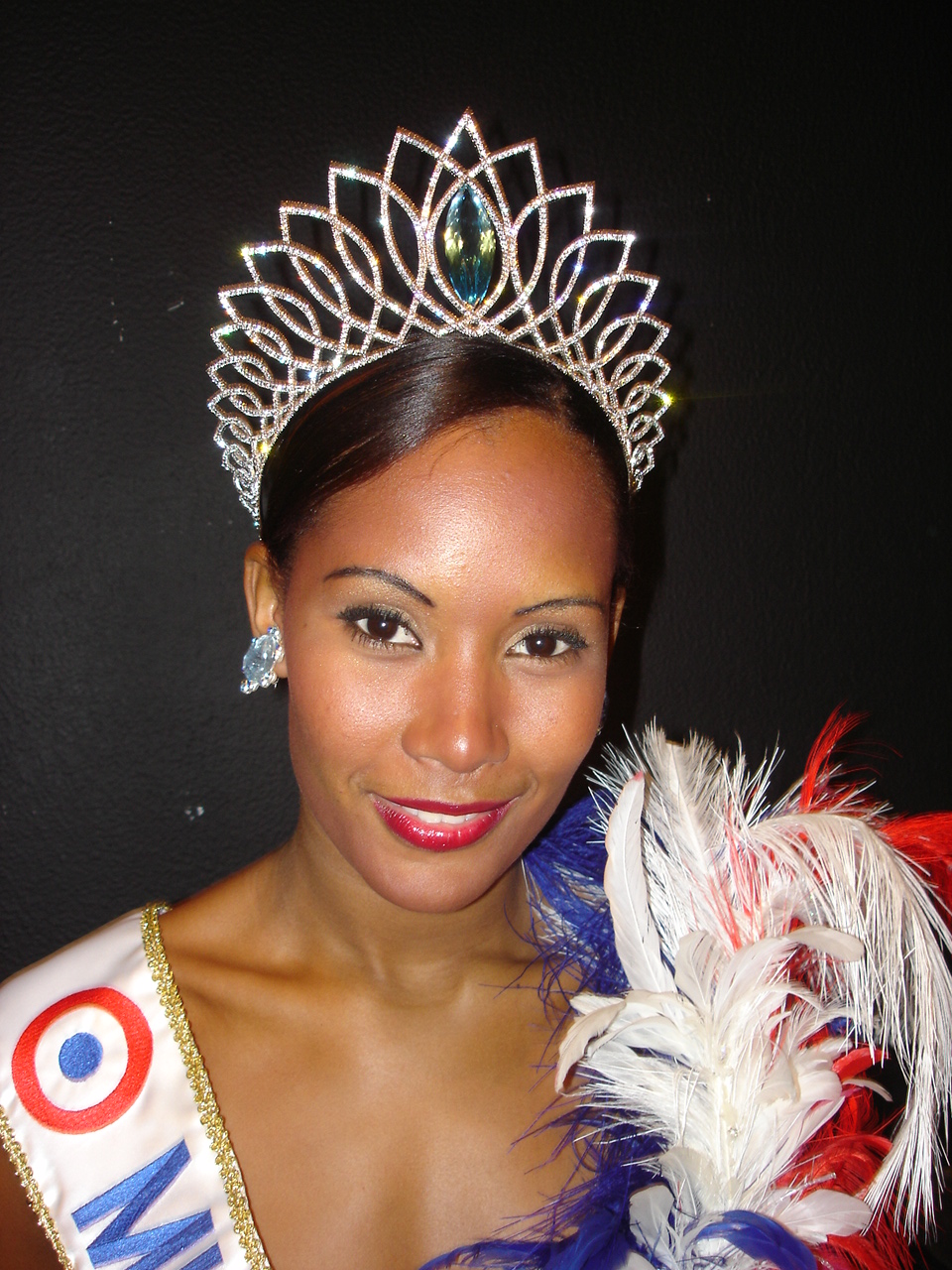
Miss France 2003
Corinne Coman

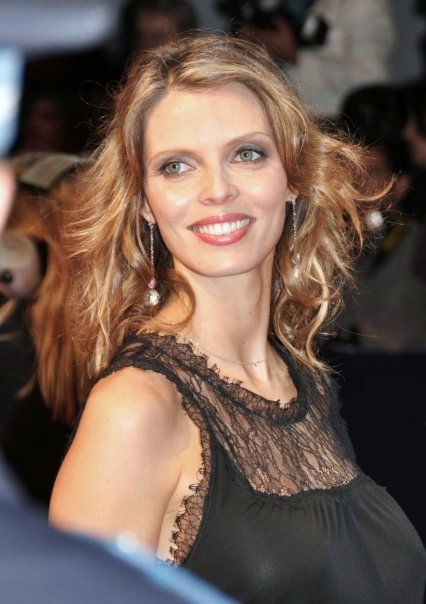
Miss France 2002
Sylvie Tellier

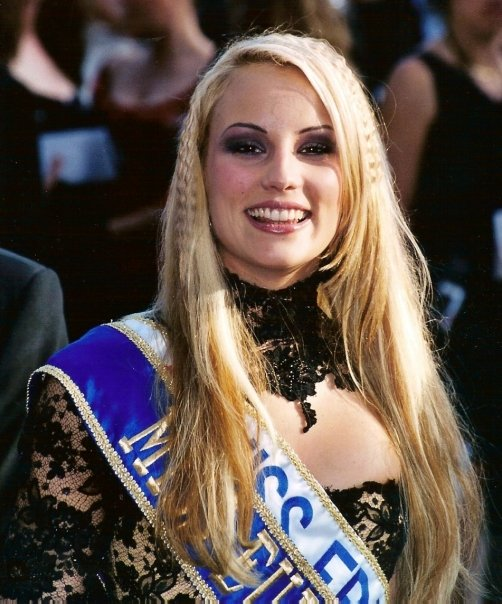
Miss France 2001 and Miss Europe 2001
Élodie Gossuin

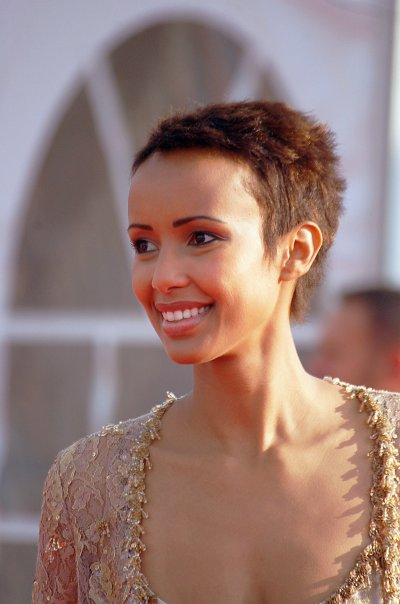
Miss France 2000
Sonia Rolland

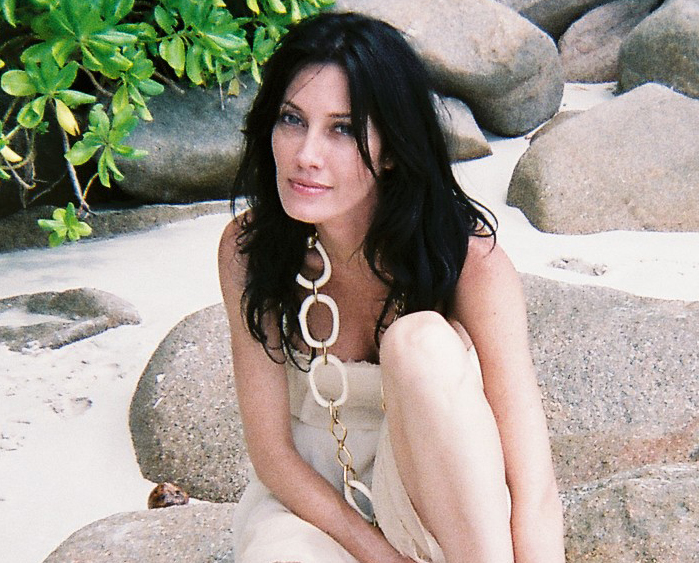
Miss France 1999
Mareva Galanter

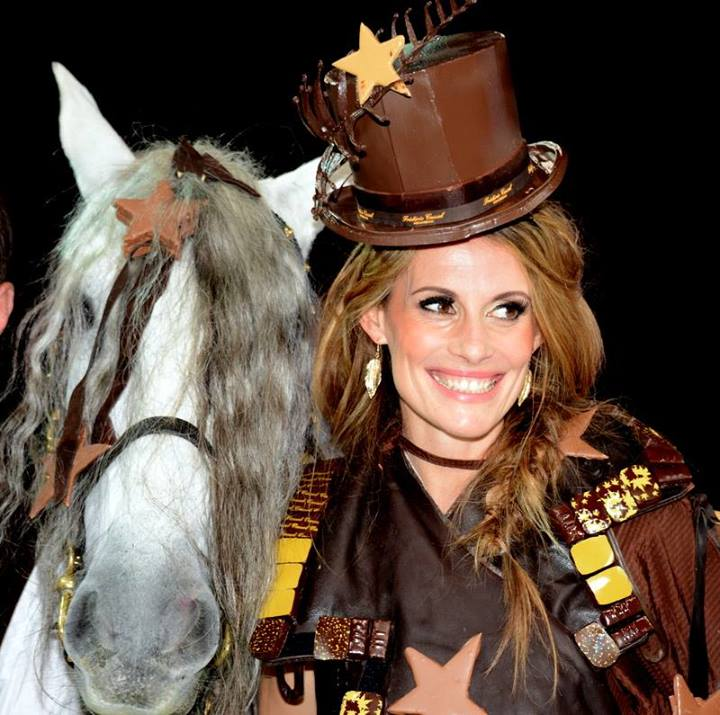
Miss France 1998
Sophie Thalmann

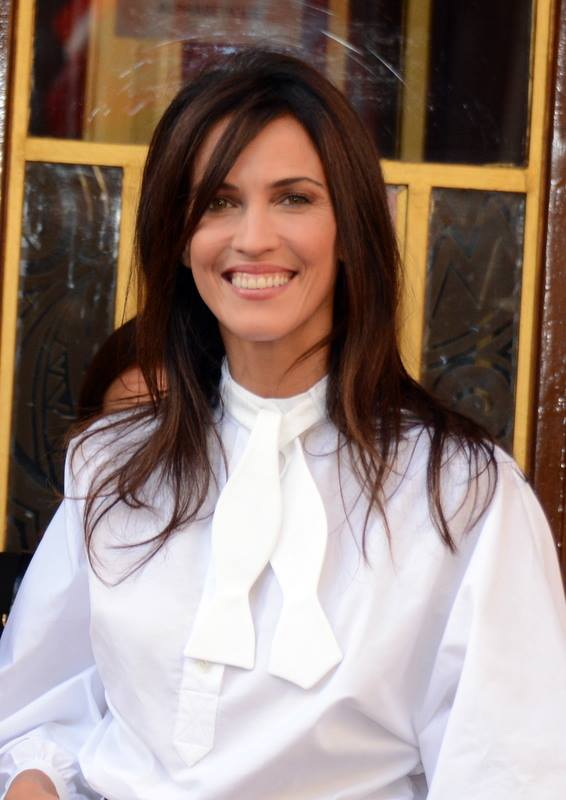
Miss France 1992
Linda Hardy

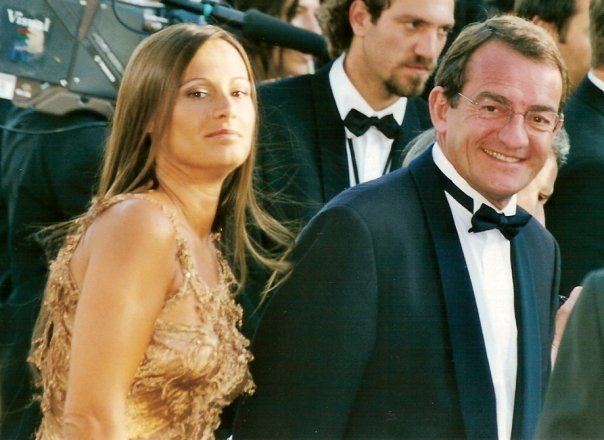
Miss France 1987
Nathalie Marquay

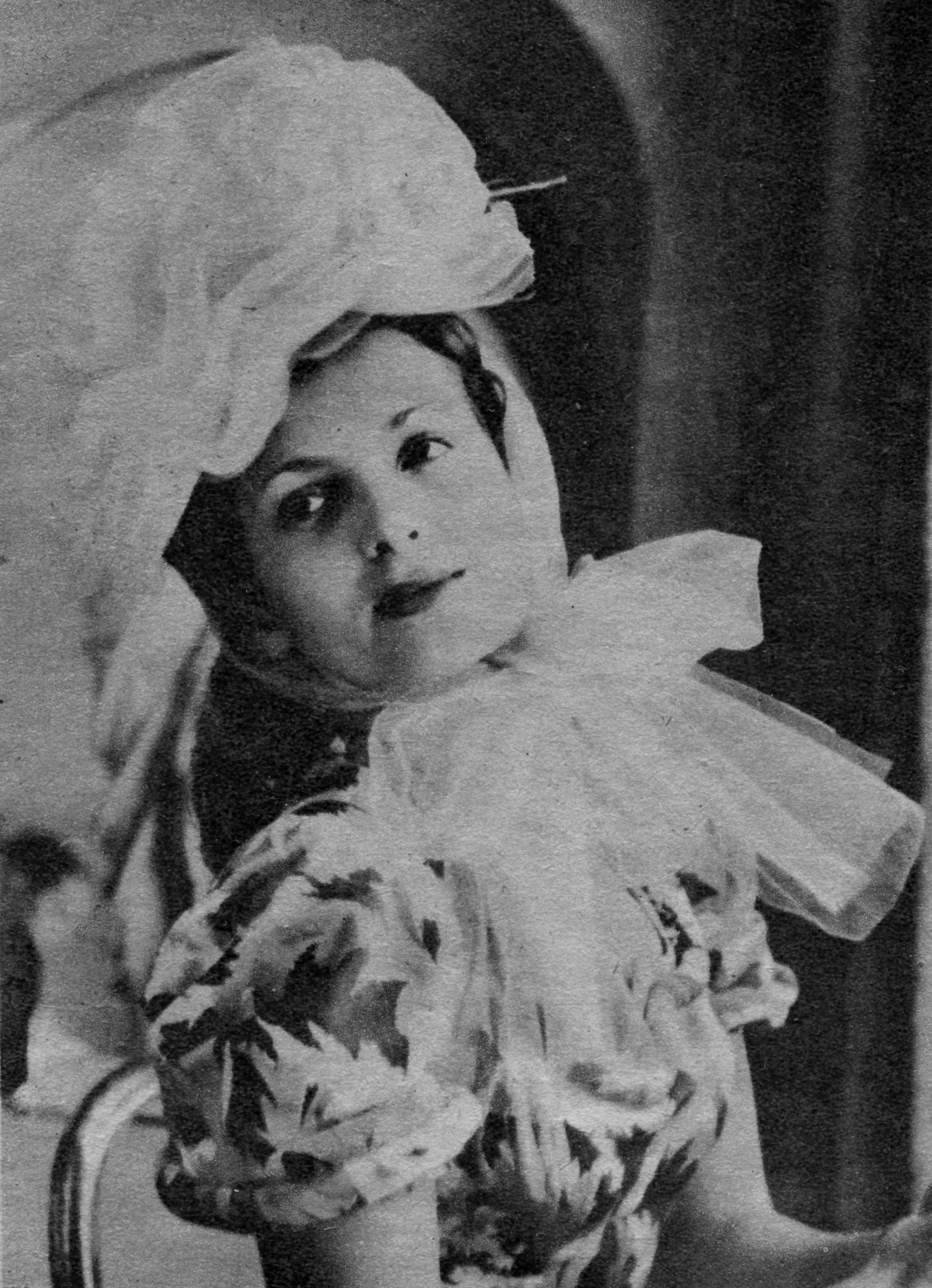
Miss France 1949 and Miss Europe 1949
Juliette Figueras

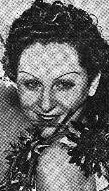
Miss France 1938
Annie Garrigues

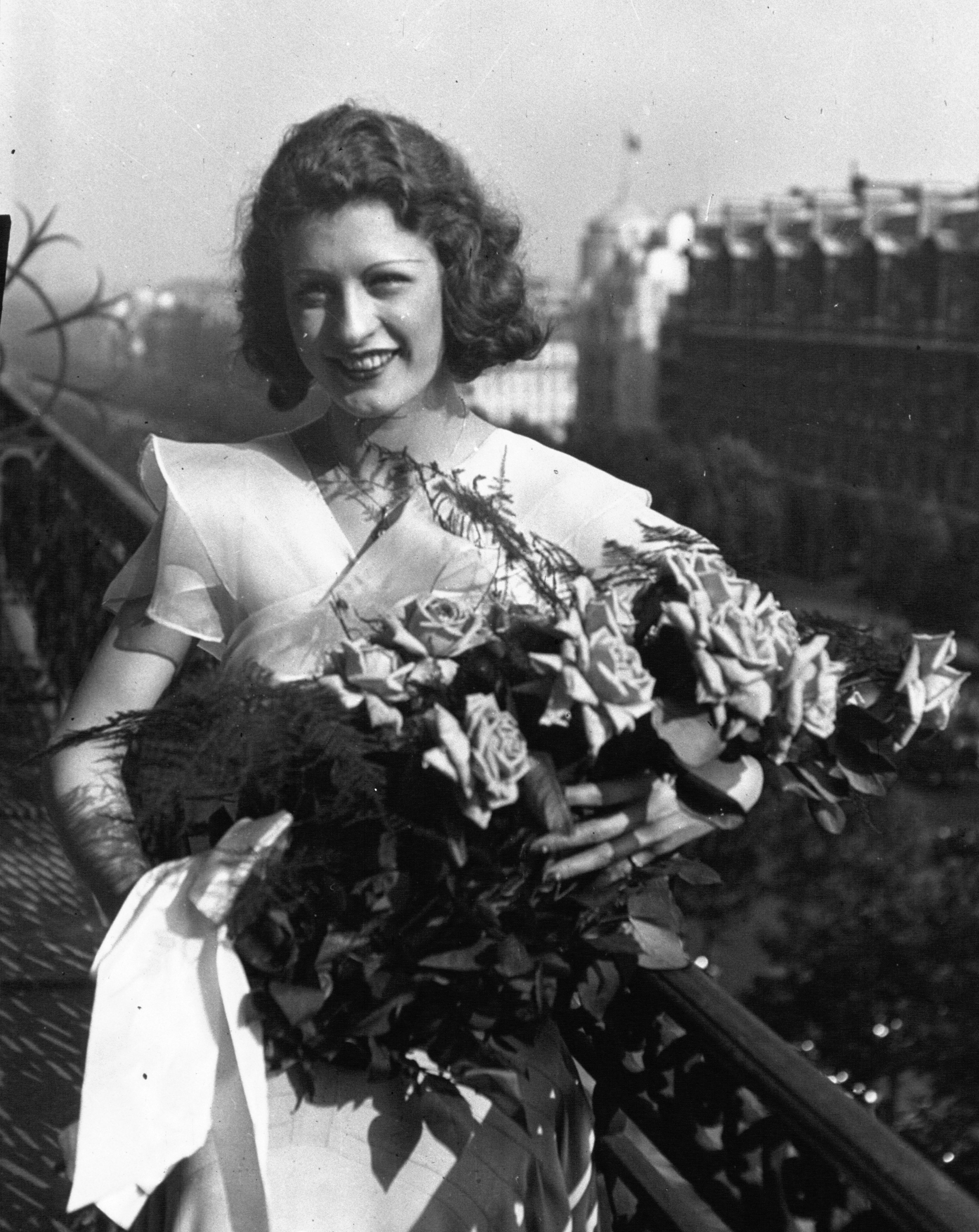
Miss France 1934
Simone Barillier

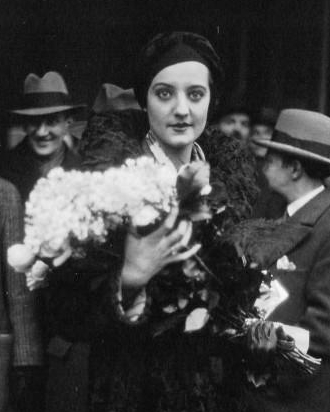
Miss France 1932
Lyne de Souza

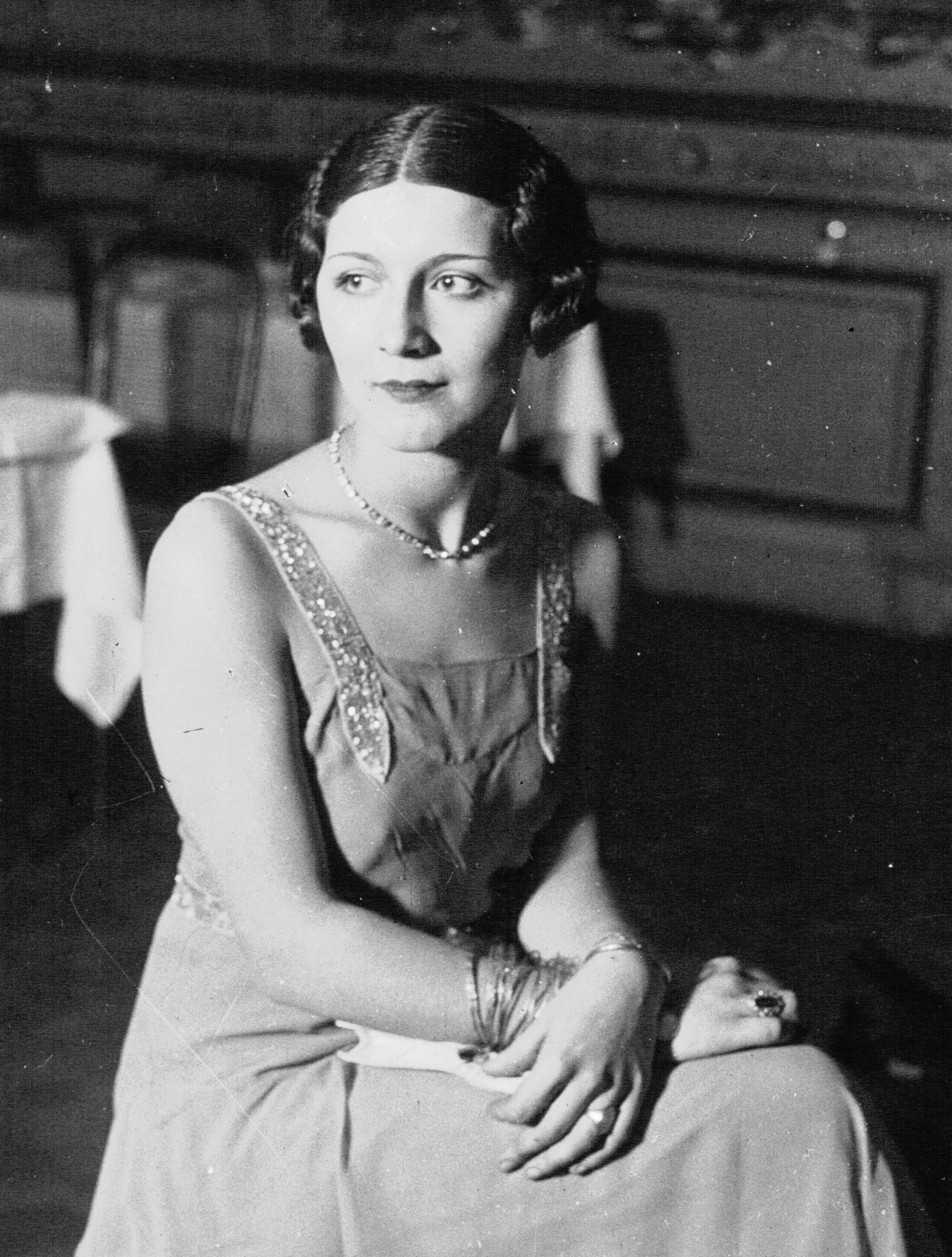
Miss France 1931 and Miss Europe 1931
Jeanne Juilla

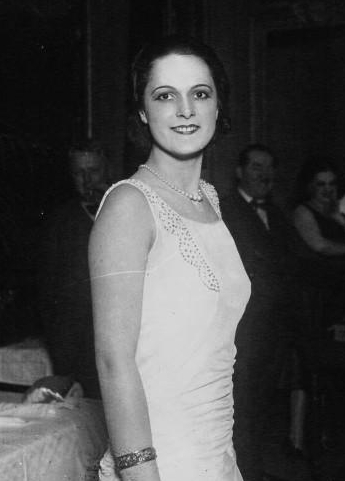
Miss France 1930
Yvette Labrousse

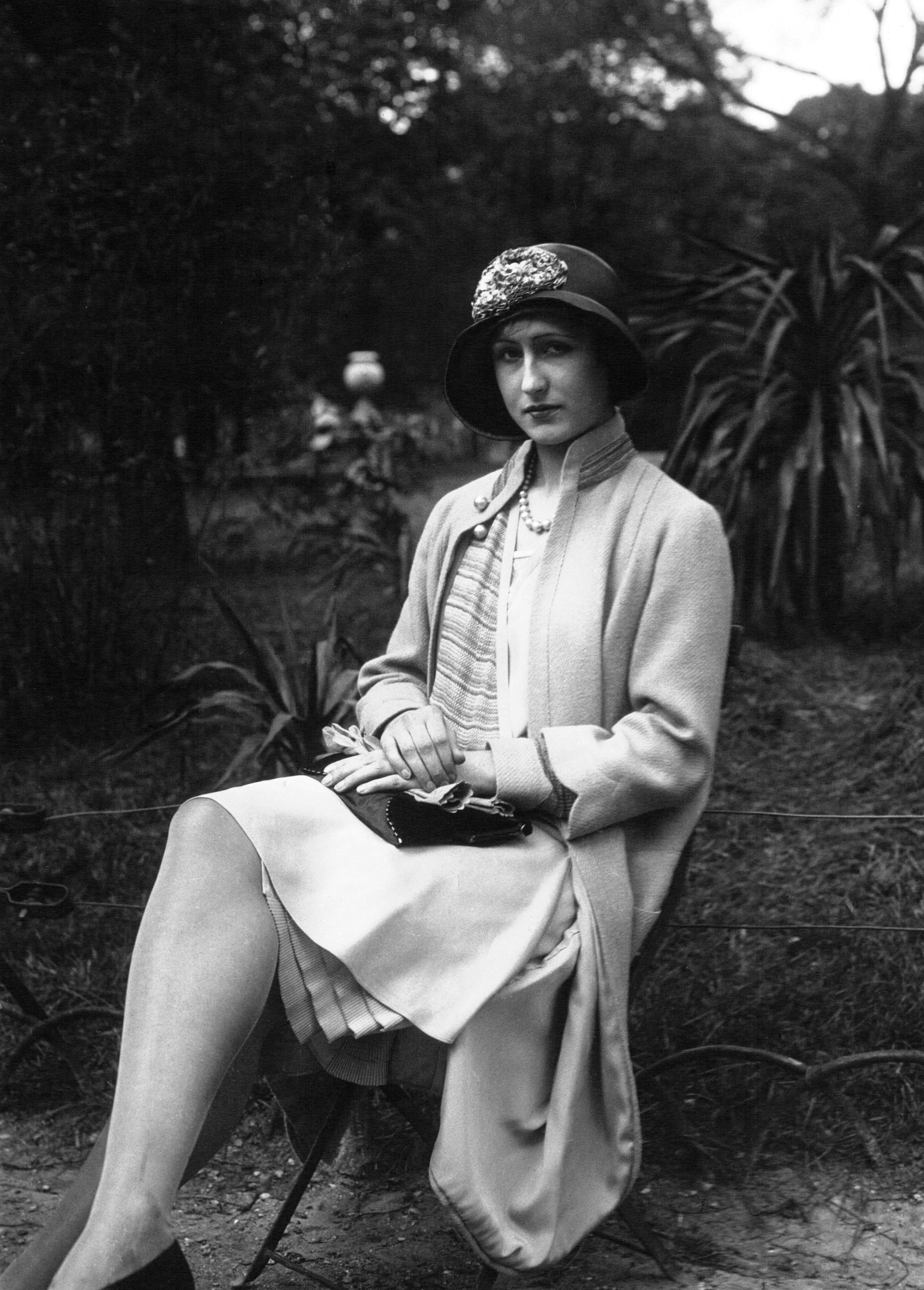
Miss France 1928
Raymonde Allain

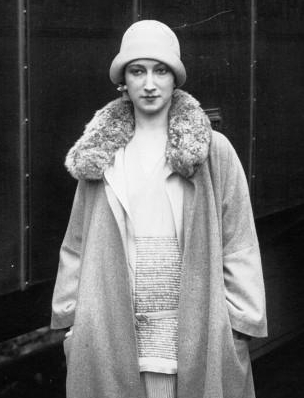
Miss France 1927
Roberte Cusey

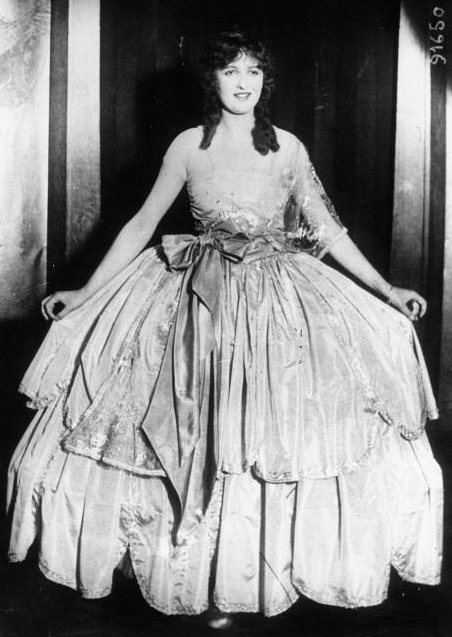
Miss France 1920
Agnès Souret

=== Winners by region ===
Number	Region	Years
16	Île-de-France	1933; 1934; 1935; 1939; 1948; 1949; 1950; 1955; 1963; 1970; 1972 (Note: In 1972, winner Chantal Bouvier de la Motte of Île-de-France resigned the title after suffering serious injuries after falling off of a horse. She was replaced by her first runner-up, Claudine Cassereau of Poitou-Charentes, as Miss France 1972.); 1978 (Note: In 1978, winner Pascale Taurua of New Caledonia resigned the title shortly after winning due to her wishing to remain in New Caledonia and not move to Paris. She was replaced by her first runner-up, Brigitte Konjovic of Île-de-France, as Miss France 1978.); 1983 (Note: In 1983, winner Isabelle Turpault of Île-de-France was dethroned after images taken of her in an erotic photoshoot were released, against pageant rules. She was replaced by her first runner-up, Frédérique Marcelle Leroy of Aquitaine, as Miss France 1983.); 1986; 1997; 2022
7	Normandy	1958; 1967; 1981; 1984; 2005; 2010; 2021
7	Rhône-Alpes	1930; 1957; 1965; 1968; 1988; 1996; 2002
7	Aquitaine	1920; 1931; 1952; 1983; 1989; 1990; 1995
6	(French Polynesia) Tahiti	1974; 1980 (Note: In 1980, winner Thilda Fuller of Tahiti resigned the title three days after winning due to personal reasons. She was replaced by her first runner-up, Patricia Barzyk of Franche-Comté, as Miss France 1980.); 1991; 1999; 2019; 2026
6	Alsace	1940; 1969; 1985; 1987; 2004; 2012
6	Brittany	1928; 1937; 1960; 1961; 1962; 2011
6	(Nice) Côte d'Azur	1932; 1947; 1951; 1954; 1966; 1982
4	Nord-Pas-de-Calais	2015; 2016; 2018; 2024
4	Guadeloupe	1993; 2003; 2020; 2023
4	Picardy	1936; 1953; 2001; 2007
3
3	Burgundy	1964 (Note: In 1964, winner Arlette Collot of Burgundy was dethroned after refusing to travel throughout France as part of her official duties. She was replaced by her first runner-up, Jacqueline Gayraud of Pays de la Loire, as Miss France 1964.); 2000; 2013
3	(Languedoc-Roussillon) Languedoc	1929; 1971; 2006
3	Lorraine	1973; 1975; 1998
3	Pays de la Loire	1964; 1992; 1994
3	Poitou-Charentes	1959; 1972; 1977
2	Réunion	1976; 2008
2	Franche-Comté	1927; 1980
1	Martinique	2025
1	French Guiana	2017
1	Centre-Val de Loire	2014
1	Midi-Pyrénées	2009
1	Provence	1979
1	New Caledonia	1978
1	Morocco	1956
1	Roussillon	1938
1	Saar	1935
1	Corsica	1921
