= Miss Europe 2001 =

International beauty pageant

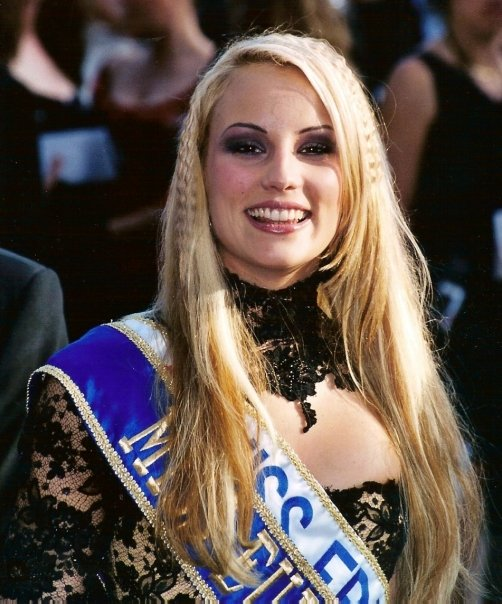
- Élodie Gossuin, Miss Europe 2001
- Date: December 29, 2001
- Venue: Beirut International Exhibition & Leisure Center, Beirut, Lebanon
- Broadcaster: TMC Monte Carlo
- Entrants: 33
- Placements: 15
- Debuts: Bosnia & Herzegovina
- Withdrawals: Austria; Bulgaria; Great Britain; Ireland; Italy; Lithuania; Norway; Portugal; Switzerland
- Returns: San Marino; Yugoslavia
- Winner: Élodie Gossuin; France

Miss Europe 2001, was the 54th edition of the Miss Europe pageant and the 43rd edition under the Mondial Events Organization. It was held at the Beirut International Exhibition & Leisure Center in Beirut, Lebanon on December 29, 2001. Élodie Gossuin of France was crowned Miss Europe 2001 by outgoing titleholder Yelena Rogozhina of Russia.

== Results ==
=== Placements ===
Placement	Contestant
Miss Europe 2001	France – Élodie Gossuin
1st Runner-Up	Poland – Adriana Gerczew
2nd Runner-Up	Croatia – Karla Milinovic
3rd Runner-Up	Turkey – Hatice Sendil
4th Runner-Up	Spain – Verónica Martín
Top 15	Armenia – Irina Tovmasian; Belarus – Alesya Shmigel'skaya; Finland – Susanna Tervaniemi; Greece – Eleftheria Pantelidaki; Iceland – Íris Björk Árnadóttir; Moldova – Yuliya Shavelyeva; Romania – Corina Nicoleta Tulan; Russia – Oksana Kalandyrets; Slovakia – Lucia Pilkova; Ukraine – Kseniya Kuz'menko

== Contestants ==
- Albania – Gentiana Ramadani
- Armenia – Irina Tovmasian
- Belarus – Alesya Shmigel'skaya
- Belgium – Ann Van Elsen
- Bosnia & Herzegovina – Sanja Plese
- Croatia – Karla Milinovic
- Cyprus – Despina Romanaki
- Czech Republic – Ema Černáková
- Denmark – Marie Nordmann
- Estonia – Ragne Sinikas
- Finland – Susanna Tervaniemi
- France – Élodie Gossuin
- Georgia – Ana Ashvetiya
- Germany – Katharina Berndt
- Greece – Eleftheria Pantelidaki
- Holland – Irena Pantelic
- Hungary – Palma Perenyi
- Iceland – Íris Björk Árnadóttir
- Latvia – Julija Djadenko
- Macedonia FYRO – Maja Georgieva
- Malta – Loredana Zammit
- Moldova – Yuliya Shavelyeva
- Poland – Adriana Gerczew
- Romania – Corina Nicoleta Tulan
- Russia – Oksana Kalandyrets
- San Marino – Marzia Bellesso
- Slovak Republic – Lucia Pilkova
- Slovenia – Anja Slatinsek
- Spain – Verónica Martín García
- Sweden – Elisabeth Halle
- Turkey – Suna Azak
- Ukraine – Kseniya Kuz'menko
- Yugoslavia – Nevena Djordjevic
