= Sonia Rolland =

French actress and Miss France 2000 (born 1981)

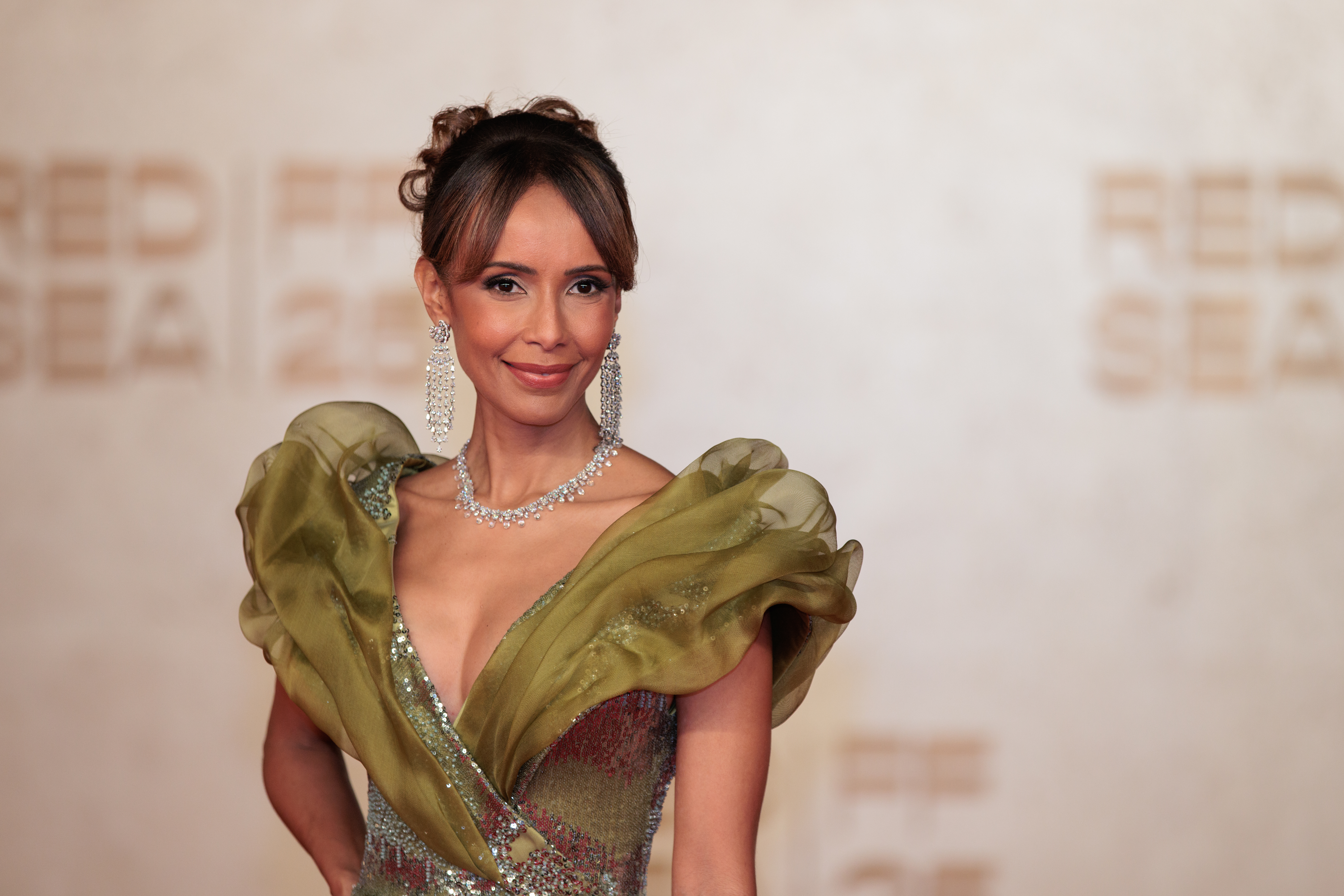
- Sonia Rolland, 2025
- Born: 11 February 1981 (age 45); Kigali, Rwanda
- Height: 1.78 m (5 ft 10 in)
- Children: 2
- Beauty pageant titleholder
- Title: Miss Burgundy 1999; Miss France 2000
- Major competitions: Miss Burgundy 1999 (Winner); Miss France 2000 (Winner); Miss Universe 2000 (Top 10)

Sonia Rolland (born 11 February 1981) is a French-Rwandan actress and beauty pageant titleholder who was crowned Miss France 2000 and represented her country at Miss Universe 2000 where she placed Top 10. She was the first African-born winner of the Miss France pageant.

Born in Kigali, Rwanda, to a Rwandan mother and a French father, Rolland and her family fled the country due to safety concerns with the genocide committed against Tutsi in Rwanda 1994 instigating, especially since her mother was Tutsi. In 1990 they moved to the neighboring country of Burundi. With the growing unrest that led to the Burundi Civil War, they moved to France in 1994. At the age of 13, Rolland settled with her family in Burgundy in the small town of Cluny.

In October 1999, Sonia Rolland won the "Miss Burgundy" beauty contest that allowed her to compete for the Miss France 2000 title and at the age of 18 she was the first woman of African descent to win. At the Miss Universe 2000 pageant, which took place in Cyprus, Rolland was a top 10 semi-finalist, placing 9th overall.

Rolland once lived in Paris with Christophe Rocancourt, an impostor, confidence man and gentleman thief who scammed affluent people by masquerading as a French member of the Rockefeller family. They had a daughter together, named Tess. They announced their split on 10 April 2008. Rolland has another daughter, Kahina, with actor and director Jalil Lespert, who is her partner since 2009.

At twenty years old after serious acting lessons with renowned actor Alain Delon, Rolland embarked on a new career as an actress. Following an unsettling incident during which she was attacked in the metro she took kickboxing classes that later proved advantageous as they helped her land the role of Léa in the television series Léa Parker that ran for two seasons from 2004 to 2006.

== Literary work ==
Rolland's first book was published in 2007 titled "Les gazelles n'ont pas peur du noir" which in English translates to "Gazelles are not afraid of the dark". The book is her testimony to her childhood in Rwanda, transition to a different culture, her modeling and acting career, her philanthropic work and her family. Her next book was "Beauté Black" which was collaboration with Sandrine Jeanne-Rose, an expert in ethnic and black cosmetics and hair care. This collection of practical guidelines is mainly meant to reach women of African descent. The two beauty enthusiasts focus on three areas: the face, the body and most importantly the hair essentially afro-textured hair as it is an important subject in the black community.

== Philanthropy ==
Rolland's work is mostly concentrated in Rwanda where she focuses a lot on education, as it is one of the things children survivors of the Genocide have missed out on. She is currently collecting funds that will go towards building a school. With her new documentary "Rwanda Mon Amour" ("Rwanda My Love") in the works the former Miss France is hoping to inspire other African nations to follow the example of Rwanda by encourage the people to participate in the ongoing changes but at the same time Rolland promises to be impartial and objective about the achievements of the country over the last 20 years. The documentary is expected to make an appearance at the Cannes film festival.

== Filmography ==
Year	Title	Role	Director	Notes
2001	C'est pas facile...			TV series (1 episode)
2002	Les pygmées de Carlo	Désirée	Radu Mihăileanu	TV movie
2004	Le p'tit curieux	The optician	Jean Marboeuf	
2004–06	Léa Parker	Léa Parker	Jean-Pierre Prévost, Robin Davis, ...	TV series (50 episodes)
2006	A City Is Beautiful at Night	The Transsexual Dancer	Richard Bohringer	
2007	Les zygs, le secret des disparus	Lise	Jacques Fansten	TV movie
2009	Moloch Tropical	Michaëlle	Raoul Peck	TV movie
2010	Affaires étrangères	Clara Lecuyer	Vincenzo Marano	TV series (1 episode)
2011	Midnight in Paris	Josephine Baker	Woody Allen	Nominated – Phoenix Film Critics Society Award for Best Cast
2011	Les invincibles	Vanessa	Alexandre Castagnetti & Pierric Gantelmi d'Ille	TV series (7 episodes)
2012	Désordres	Marie	Etienne Faure	
2012	Toussaint Louverture	Marie-Eugénie Sonthonax	Philippe Niang	TV mini-series
2013	The French Minister	Nathalie	Bertrand Tavernier	
2013	Cherif	Ludivine Delaunay	Vincent Giovanni	TV series (1 episode)
2013	Nos chers voisins	Sabrina	Emmanuel Rigaut	TV series (1 episode)
2015	Le vagabond de la Baie de Somme	Aurore Debac	Claude-Michel Rome	TV movie
2015	Caïn	Betty	Christophe Douchand	TV series (1 episode)
2016	Windows	The Woman	Jules Sitruk	Short
2017	Madame	Marinette	Amanda Sthers	
2017	La Colle		Alexandre Castagnetti (2)	
2019–present	Tropiques criminels (Deadly Tropics)	Mélissa Sainte-Rose		TV series (main cast)

Preceded by Mareva Galanter	Miss France; 2000	Succeeded by Élodie Gossuin
