= Miss Picardy =

- Type: Beauty pageant
- Headquarters: Picardy, France
- Members: Miss France
- Official language: French
- Regional director: Maxime Schneider

Miss Picardy (French: Miss Picardie) is a French beauty pageant which selects a representative for the Miss France national competition from the region of Picardy. The first Miss Picardy was crowned in 1927, although the title was not used regularly until 1985.

The current Miss Picardy is Marie Villez, who was crowned Miss Picardy 2026 on 13 September 2026. Four women from Picardy have been crowned Miss France:

- Lyne Lassalle, who was crowned Miss France 1936
- Sylviane Carpentier, who was crowned Miss France 1953
- Élodie Gossuin, who was crowned Miss France 2001
- Rachel Legrain-Trapani, who was crowned Miss France 2007

== Results summary ==
- Miss France: Lyne Lassalle (1935); Sylviane Carpentier (1952); Élodie Gossuin (2000); Rachel Legrain-Trapani (2006)
- 3rd Runner-Up: Anastasia Winnebroot (2010)
- 4th Runner-Up: Véronique Babic (1982)
- 5th Runner-Up: Adeline Legris-Croisel (2014)
- 6th Runner-Up: Charlotte Desauty (2002)
- Top 12/Top 15: Sophie Vanharen (1998); Émilie Mika (2012); Myrtille Cauchefer (2016); Morgane Fradon (2019); Bérénice Legendre (2022); Marina Przadka (2024); Emma Boivin (2025)

== Gallery ==
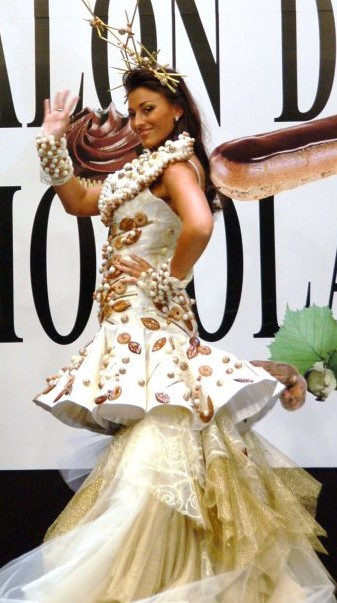
Miss Picardy 2006 and Miss France 2007
Rachel Legrain-Trapani

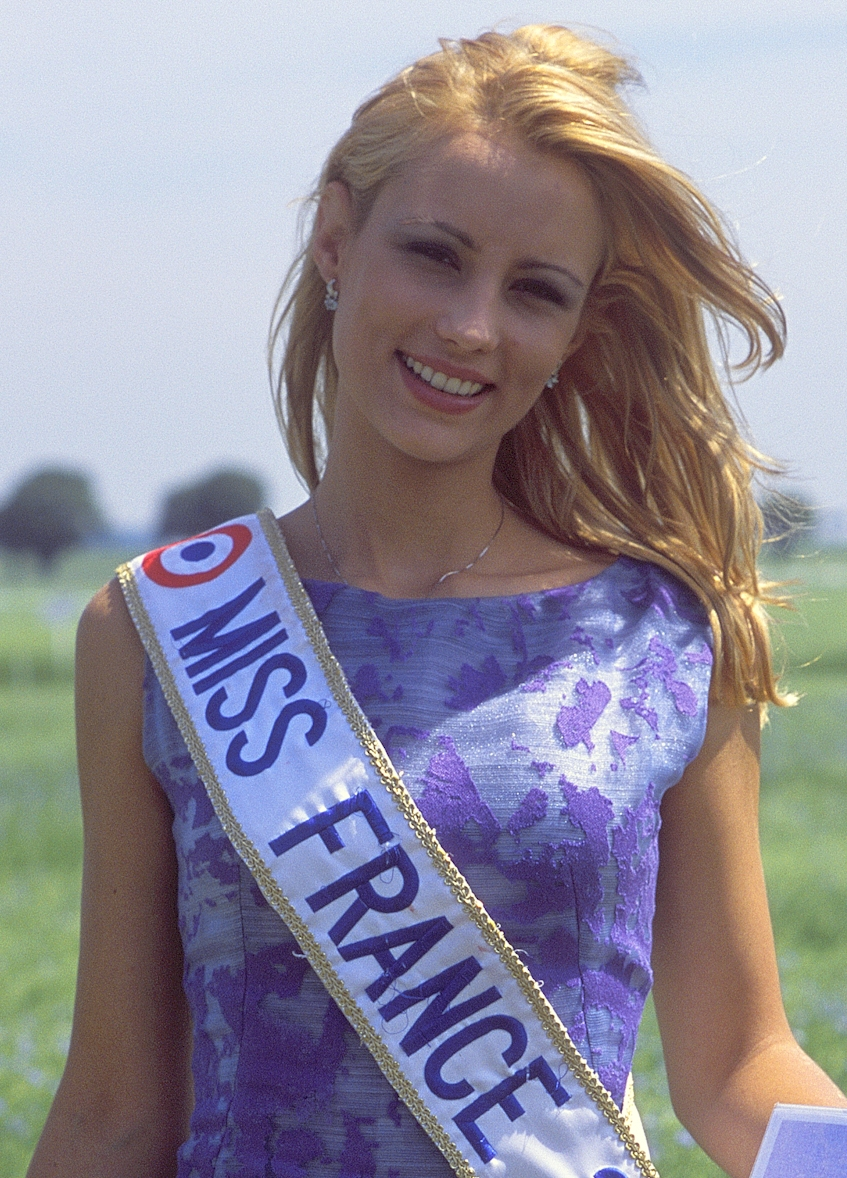
Miss Picardy 2000 and Miss France 2001
Élodie Gossuin

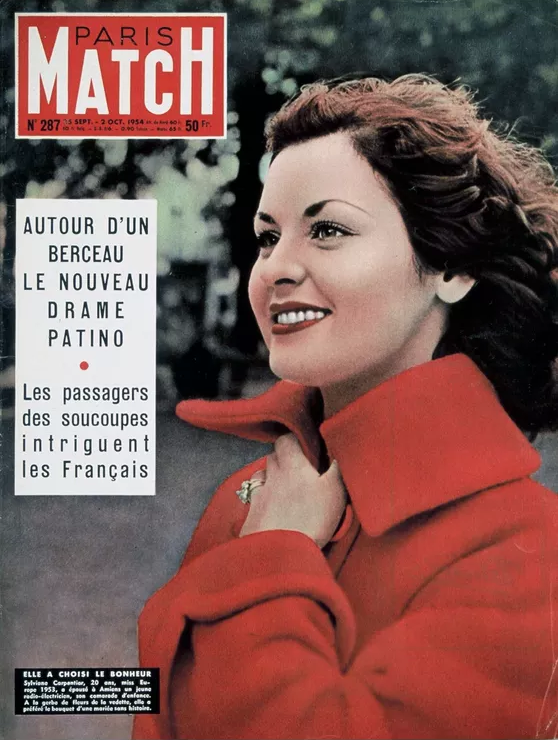
Miss Picardy 1952 and Miss France 1953
Sylviane Carpentier

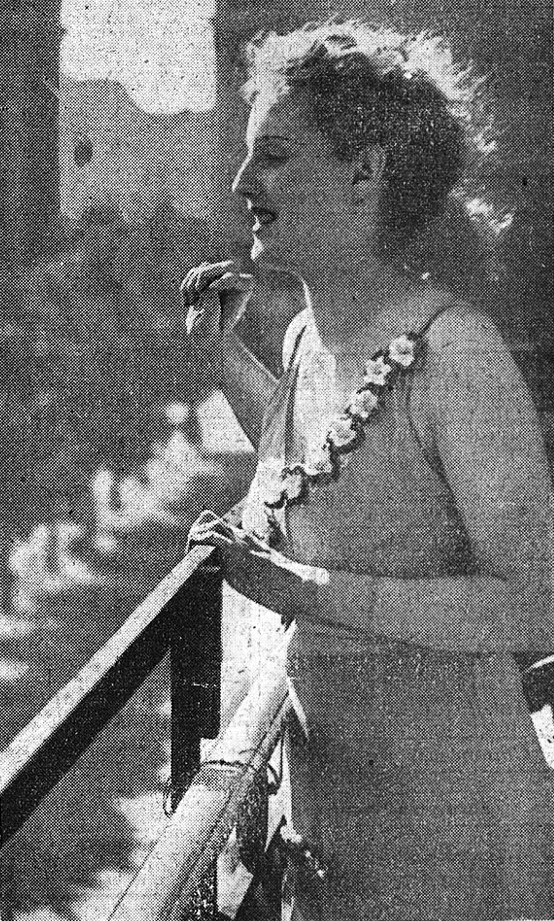
Miss Picardy 1935 and Miss France 1936
Lyne Lassalle

== Titleholders ==
Year	Name	Age (Note: Ages at the time of Miss France)	Height	Hometown	Miss France placement	Notes
2026	Marie Villez	26	1.73 m (5 ft 8 in)	Amiens	TBD	
2025	Emma Boivin	25	1.78 m (5 ft 10 in)	Beauvais	Top 12	
2024	Marina Przadka	26	1.70 m (5 ft 7 in)	Villers-Saint-Paul	Top 15	
2023	Charlotte Cresson	23	1.71 m (5 ft 7 1/2 in)	Nesle		
2022	Bérénice Legendre	26	1.71 m (5 ft 7 1/2 in)	Amiens	Top 15	
2021	Hayate El Gharmaoui	21	1.72 m (5 ft 7 1/2 in)	Compiègne		
2020	Tara de Mets	22	1.79 m (5 ft 10 1/2 in)	Clermont		
2019	Morgane Fradon	20	1.75 m (5 ft 9 in)	Cires-lès-Mello	Top 15	
2018	Assia Kerim	22	1.71 m (5 ft 7 1/2 in)	Amiens		
2017	Paoulina Prylutska	19	1.70 m (5 ft 7 in)	Compiègne		
2016	Myrtille Cauchefer	24	1.76 m (5 ft 9 1/2 in)	Albert	Top 12	
2015	Émilie Delaplace	19	1.73 m (5 ft 8 in)	Creil		
2014	Adeline Legris-Croisel	21	1.77 m (5 ft 9 1/2 in)	Amiens	Top 12 (5th Runner-Up)	
2013	Manon Beurey	19	1.75 m (5 ft 9 in)	Argœuves		
2012	Émilie Mika	20	1.75 m (5 ft 9 in)	Abbeville	Top 12	
2011	Anaïs Merle	20	1.74 m (5 ft 8 1/2 in)	Cires-lès-Mello		
2010	Anastasia Winnebroot	20	1.78 m (5 ft 10 in)	Compiègne	3rd Runner-Up	
2009	Juliette Boubaaya	19	1.72 m (5 ft 7 1/2 in)	Saint-Quentin		
2008	Katy Josse	22	1.70 m (5 ft 7 in)	Saint-Quentin		
2007	Julie Tristan	22	1.78 m (5 ft 10 in)	Compiègne		
2006	Rachel Legrain-Trapani	18	1.72 m (5 ft 7 1/2 in)	Saint-Quentin	Miss France 2007	Competed at Miss Universe 2007 Competed at Miss World 2007
2005	Sophie Blaisel	20	1.80 m (5 ft 11 in)	Compiègne		
2004	Aurore Carbonneau	21	1.74 m (5 ft 8 1/2 in)	Soissons		
2003	Natacha Duboeuf			Tergnier		
2002	Charlotte Desauty	18	1.78 m (5 ft 10 in)	Vieux-Moulin	Top 12 (6th Runner-Up)	
2001	Christelle Lenoble	22	1.76 m (5 ft 9 1/2 in)			
2000	Élodie Gossuin	20	1.80 m (5 ft 11 in)	Trosly-Breuil	Miss France 2001	Top 10 at Miss Universe 2001
1999	Shirley Dubreuil	18	1.75 m (5 ft 9 in)	Belleu		
1998	Sophie Vanharen	23	1.73 m (5 ft 8 in)		Top 12	
1997	Belinda Hanart	19	1.77 m (5 ft 9 1/2 in)			
1996	Magalie Lherminier					
1995	Virginie Beernaert					
1994	Hélène Bodart					
1993	Marianne Boulanger					
1991	Sophie Blondelle-Bourez					
1990	Catherine Marcellin					
1988	Karine Grandjean					
1987	Carole Niedzickowski					
1986	Christine Prévot					
1985	Sabine Schemith					
1982	Véronique Babic				4th Runner-Up	
1978	Marie-Laure Cartry					
1977	Marie-Hélène Cartry					Cartry was crowned Miss Picardy, while Lajeunesse was crowned Miss Thiérache.
1977	Catherine Lajeunesse					Cartry was crowned Miss Picardy, while Lajeunesse was crowned Miss Thiérache.
1976	Dominique Laurent					
1973	Evelyne Pillon					
1967	Sylvie Gourdon					
1952	Sylviane Carpentier	18			Miss France 1953	
1935	Lyne Lassalle	16			Miss France 1936	
1933	Jacqueline Brémont	18				
1932	Denise Colombier					
1931	Julienne Rifflet					
1930	Marie-Thérèse Mercier	20				
1927	Madeleine Nogent	17				
