= Élodie Gossuin =

French beauty queen and politician

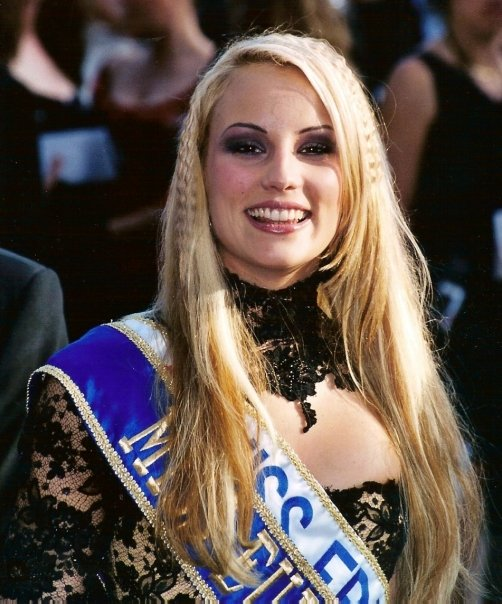
- Gossuin in 2001
- Born: 15 December 1980 (age 45); Reims, France
- Height: 1.78 m (5 ft 10 in)
- Spouse: Bertrand Lacherie (m. 2006)
- Children: 4
- Beauty pageant titleholder
- Title: Miss Oise 2000; Miss Picardy 2000; Miss France 2001; Miss Europe 2001
- Hair color: Blonde
- Eye color: Brown
- Major competitions: Miss France 2001 (Winner); Miss Universe 2001 (Top 10); Miss Europe 2001 (Winner)

Élodie Gossuin-Lacherie (née Gossuin; born 15 December 1980) is a French beauty pageant titleholder, model, radio and television presenter, columnist and regional politician. She was elected Miss Picardy 2000, Miss France 2001 (she is the 72nd Miss France), and Miss Europe 2001.

She was the French voting spokesperson in the Eurovision Song Contest from 2016 to 2018 and again in 2022. She also co-hosted the Junior Eurovision Song Contest 2021 held in Paris.

== Early life and education ==
Élodie Gossuin was born in Reims in the department of Marne to Lysiane Triquet and Yves Gossuin, she has a sister and she was raised in Trosly-Breuil in the region of Picardy, a village about 10 kilometers east of the city of Compiègne in the department of Oise. In her teens, she won several local beauty contests.

While training to be a nurse, she obtained her final high school exam in the science field with the biology option. She then studied at the Faculté de Médecine of Amiens and then studied in a nursing school.

== Miss France and Miss Europe ==
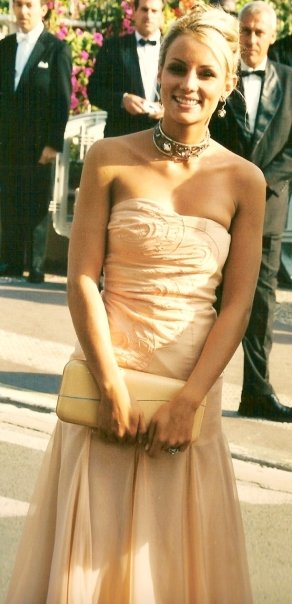
Gossuin at the 2001 Cannes Film Festival

She won the Miss Picardy beauty contest in November 2000, which qualified her to compete for the Miss France 2001 title in Monaco on 9 December 2000, broadcast directly on TF1 with an audience of 14 million viewers. She won that contest and as a result received considerable press coverage.

Her Miss France runners-up were:

- 1st runner-up: Stéphanie Faby (Miss Corsica)
- 2nd runner-up: Marine Clouet (Miss Poitou)
- 3rd runner-up: Nawal Benhlal (Miss Lyons)
- 4th runner-up: Élise Duboquet (Miss Flanders)
- 5th runner-up: Carine Bedoya (Miss Midi-Pyrénées)
- 6th runner-up: Estelle Rouquette (Miss Cévennes)

For one year, Gossuin travelled in France with Geneviève de Fontenay, president of the Miss France committee. She was ranked in the Top 10 at the Miss Universe 2001 contest in Bayamón, Puerto Rico. She then won the Miss Europe 2001 contest in Beirut, Lebanon, and then began working as a model and making publicity appearances.

Her Miss Europe runners-up were:

- 1st runner-up: Adriana Gerczew (Poland)
- 2nd runner-up: Karla Milinović (Croatia)
- 3rd runner-up: Hatice Şendil (Turkey)
- 4th runner-up: Verónica Martín (Spain)

In 2003, she became the spokesmodel for the brand Lucie Saint-Clair, an international hairdresser. That same year, her fan club and her official website were created.

Since September 2010, she has been the representative in Europe of Royal Extension, a brand of hair extensions.

== Politics ==
In 2003, Gossuin embarked on a political career. She was elected in Oise on the list of UDF-UMP party led by Gilles de Robien, and became a Regional Councillor in her native Picardy region on 28 March 2004. Her work and attendance at the Regional Council earned her the recognition of her political opponents.

Standing at seventh position in the list of the presidential majority led by Caroline Cayeux during the regional elections of 2010, she temporarily lost her mandate for a few months, but returned to the Regional Council after the resignation of Édouard Courtial on 14 October 2010.

== Television presenter ==
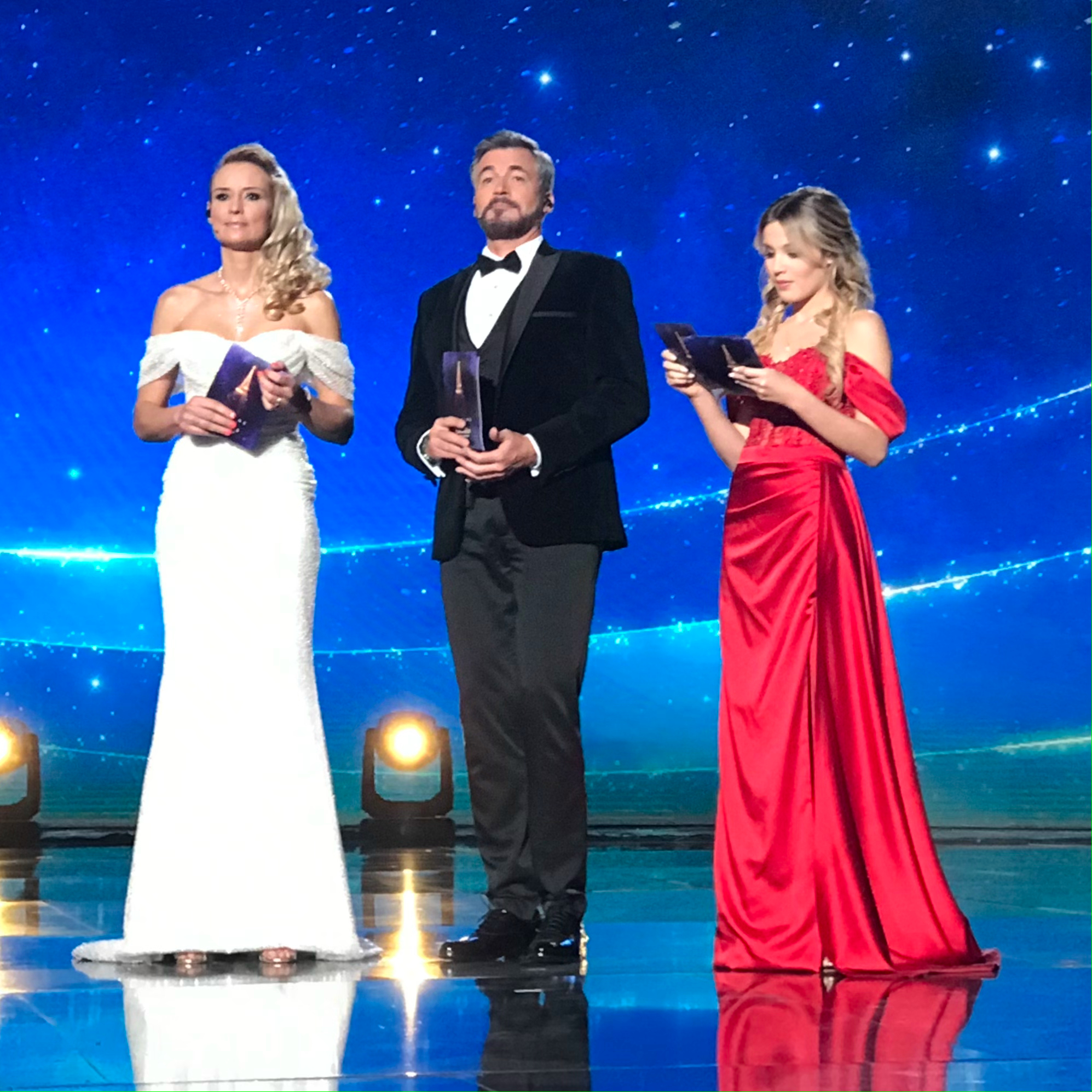
Gossuin on stage at JESC 2021

Since 2005 Gossuin has presented seasons of the program Miss Swan on TF6. In 2006, she became a columnist for the magazine Public and the program Morning café on M6. In March 2007, she joined the channel Direct 8 and became a contributor to the program Un Max de services. from April 2004 until October 2011 she was part of the team of contributors to the program Touche pas à mon poste ! presented by Cyril Hanouna on France 4.

On 5 December 2010 Gossuin and Jacky presented the Miss Nationale 2011 contest, a new initiative created by Geneviève de Fontenay. The program was also broadcast on channel BFM TV.

In 2011, she co-hosted with Énora Malagré the program Ça va mieux en le disant on France 4. Since October 2012, she presents on the same channel Un coach pour changer ma vie, a controversial program about therapeutic efficacy. In 2012, she was a contributor to the program Faut pas rater ça ! still on the same channel.

On 29 April 2016, she was announced to be France's spokesperson for the Eurovision Song Contest 2016. Her off-key interpretation of part of the French entry that year went viral on social media and became the subject of numerous video mash-ups and memes. She returned as France's spokesperson for the Eurovision Song Contest 2017, and presented the French points again in 2018.

In 2021, she was a member of the jury to help select France's entry for the Eurovision Song Contest 2021. Gossuin was selected to act as co-presenter of the Junior Eurovision Song Contest 2021 in Paris alongside Fort Boyard host Olivier Minne and former Junior Eurovision participant Carla Lazzari.

In 2022, she became the French spokesperson once again and presented the votes of the French jury in the Eurovision Song Contest 2022.

== Radio presenter ==
In March 2011, she joined the morning team of the radio program Manu à la radio ! on NRJ co-hosted by Virginie de Clausade and replaced her during her maternity leave. Gossuin also co-hosted from August 2011 to June 2012 the program Manu dans le 6/9! on the same radio station.

== Television contestant ==
Gossuin has regularly participated at the game show Mot de passe hosted by Patrick Sabatier on France 2. She participated at the first season of La Ferme Célébrités in 2004 where she was ranked third, staying ten weeks and earning €150,000 for her association. She participated ten times at Fort Boyard, in 2001, 2003, 2008 (with her husband), 2009, 2011, 2012, 2014, 2018, 2019 and 2021, to raise funds for associations.

=== Movies ===
- wicked KidsANELLEBME WICKED

She also participated in the program Incroyables Expériences broadcast on 27 February 2010 on France 2. She participated on 17 December 2011 at a prime time of the program N'oubliez pas les paroles hosted by Nagui on the same channel. With Gérard Lenorman, she earned €50,000 for the association "Vaincre la musoviscidose". She participated at Qui veut gagner des millions ? (French version of Who Wants to Be a Millionaire?) in August 2012 on TF1. In 2013, she regularly participates in the game show Tout le monde aime la France hosted by Sandrine Quétier on the same channel.

== Personal life ==
Élodie Gossuin married the model Bertrand Lacherie on 1 July 2006 in Compiègne. She added his family name attached to hers (Gossuin-Lacherie).

She gave birth on 21 December 2007 to twins, a boy and a girl named Jules and Rose. She announced on 29 May 2013 on her Twitter account that she was expecting her third child, but then announced on 23 July that she was again expecting twins.

She gave birth on 11 October 2013 to her second set of twins, a girl and a boy named Joséphine and Léonard.

== Books ==
- Élodie Gossuin, Mes rêves, mes passions, mes espoirs, Éditions Michel Lafon, 2004. ISBN 978-2749901145

Preceded by Sonia Rolland	Miss France; 2001	Succeeded by Sylvie Tellier
Preceded by Yelena Rogozhina	Miss Europe; 2001	Succeeded by Svetlana Korolyeva
Preceded by (Poland) Ida Nowakowska, Małgorzata Tomaszewska and Rafał Brzozowski	Junior Eurovision Song Contest presenter 2021; With: Carla Lazzari and Olivier Minne	Succeeded by (Armenia) Iveta Mukuchyan, Garik Papoyan and Karina Ignatyan
