= Young Russia =

Young Russia may refer to:

- Young Russia (novel), 1952 novel by Yuri German about the era of Peter the Great
- Young Russia (liberal movement), Russian liberal movement founded in 1998 by Boris Nemtsov
- Young Russia (youth movement), Russian pro-Vladimir Putin youth movement

== See also ==
- Mladorossy, "Young Russians", 1920's Russian émigré political movement
