= Boris Nemtsov Square, Prague =

Square in Prague

Boris Nemtsov Square
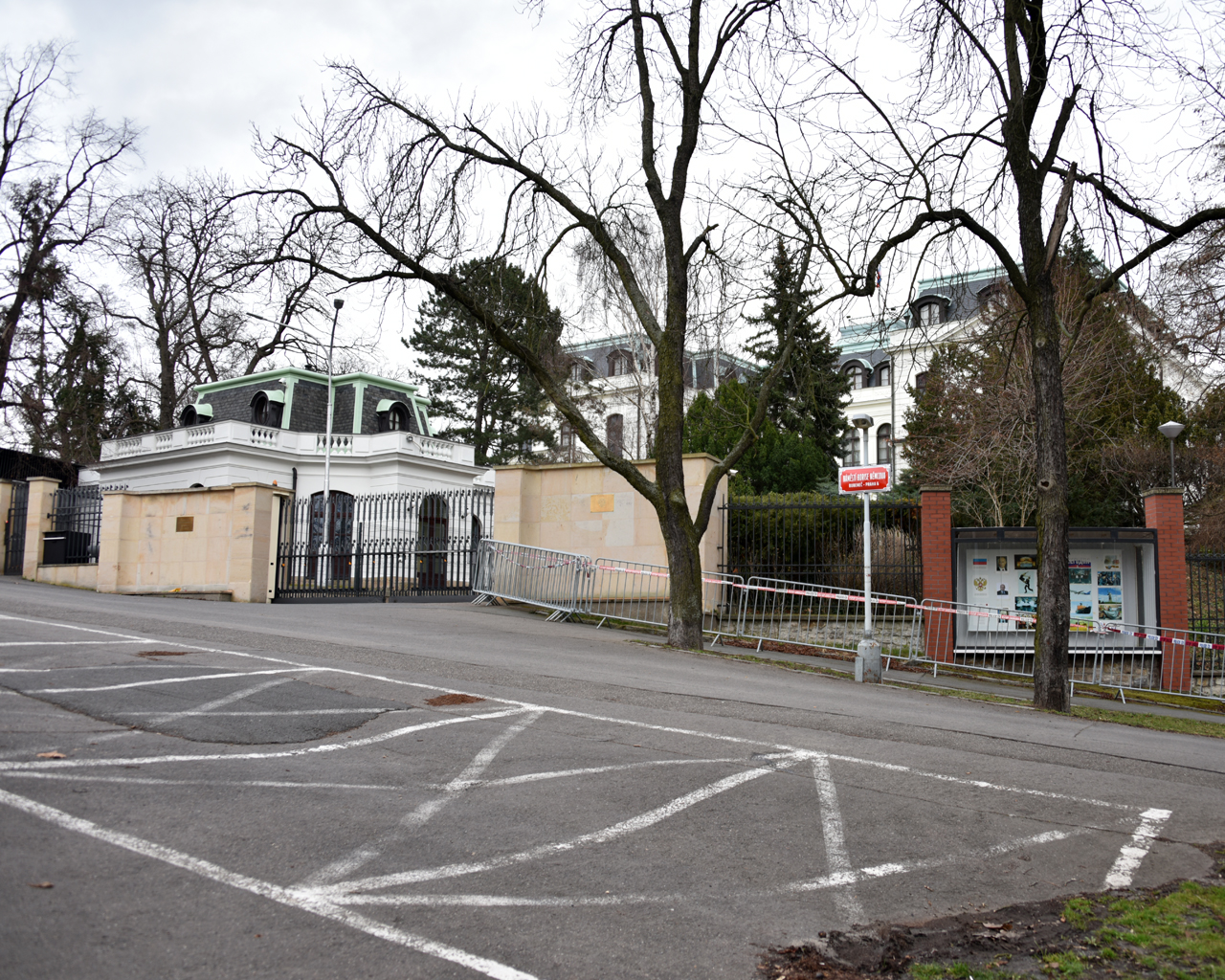
- Interactive map of Boris Nemtsov Square
- Native name: Náměstí Borise Němcova (Czech)
- Former name: Pod kaštany (Under Chestnut trees)
- Length: 60 m (200 ft)
- Addresses: Embassy of the Russian Federation in Prague
- Location: Prague 6, Bubeneč
- Coordinates: 50.102897°N 14.412193°E

Construction
- Inauguration: February 27, 2020

Boris Nemtsov Square (Czech: náměstí Borise Němcova, until 27 February 2020 náměstí Pod kaštany) is a square in Prague 6, Bubeneč, which houses the Embassy of the Russian Federation in the Czech republic.

== Original name ==
The path from the Písek Gate to the Royal Game Preserve and the Governor's Summer Palace was originally a tree-lined avenue of lime trees, which were gradually replaced by chestnut trees during the 18th and 19th centuries. The road was renamed "Královská" in 1901, renamed Pod kaštany Street in 1925, and the small square at the end of the road was renamed Pod kaštany (Under the Chestnuts Square).

Friedrich Petschek's villa, 19/1 Pod kaštany Square, was designed by architect Max Spielmann and built by architect Matěj Blecha in 1927-1930 for Bedřich (Friedrich) Petschek, who soon sold it to banker Jiří (Georg) Popper. From 1945, the villa housed the Embassy of the Soviet Union, then the Embassy of the Russian Federation in Prague.

== Boris Nemtsov Square ==
As of 2016, there was a petition demanding that the square be renamed Boris Nemtsov Square, after the Russian liberal opposition politician who was shot dead in central Moscow On February 27, 2015.

The authors of the petition said, among other things, "It is fitting that our republic and its capital city pay respect to Boris Nemtsov and honour his memory. And that it is fitting to constantly remind the current Putin regime that we are still serious about promoting freedom, democracy and human rights in the world - and also in Russia." The petition has received approximately 4,600 signatures by 2020.

=== Realization ===
On the basis of the submitted petition in 2020, a proposal to rename it Boris Nemtsov Square was approved by the Prague City Council and by the Prague City Assembly.

The square was renamed on 27 February, five years after Nemtsov was shot dead. Boris Nemtsov's daughter, Zhanna, also took part in the renaming. Czech pro-Russian president Miloš Zeman sees the act as an "unnecessary provocation", former ambassador to Russia and Ukraine Jaroslav Bašta called Prague's decision an act of Russophobia, and the change has also caused a stir among pro-Putin groups on social media.

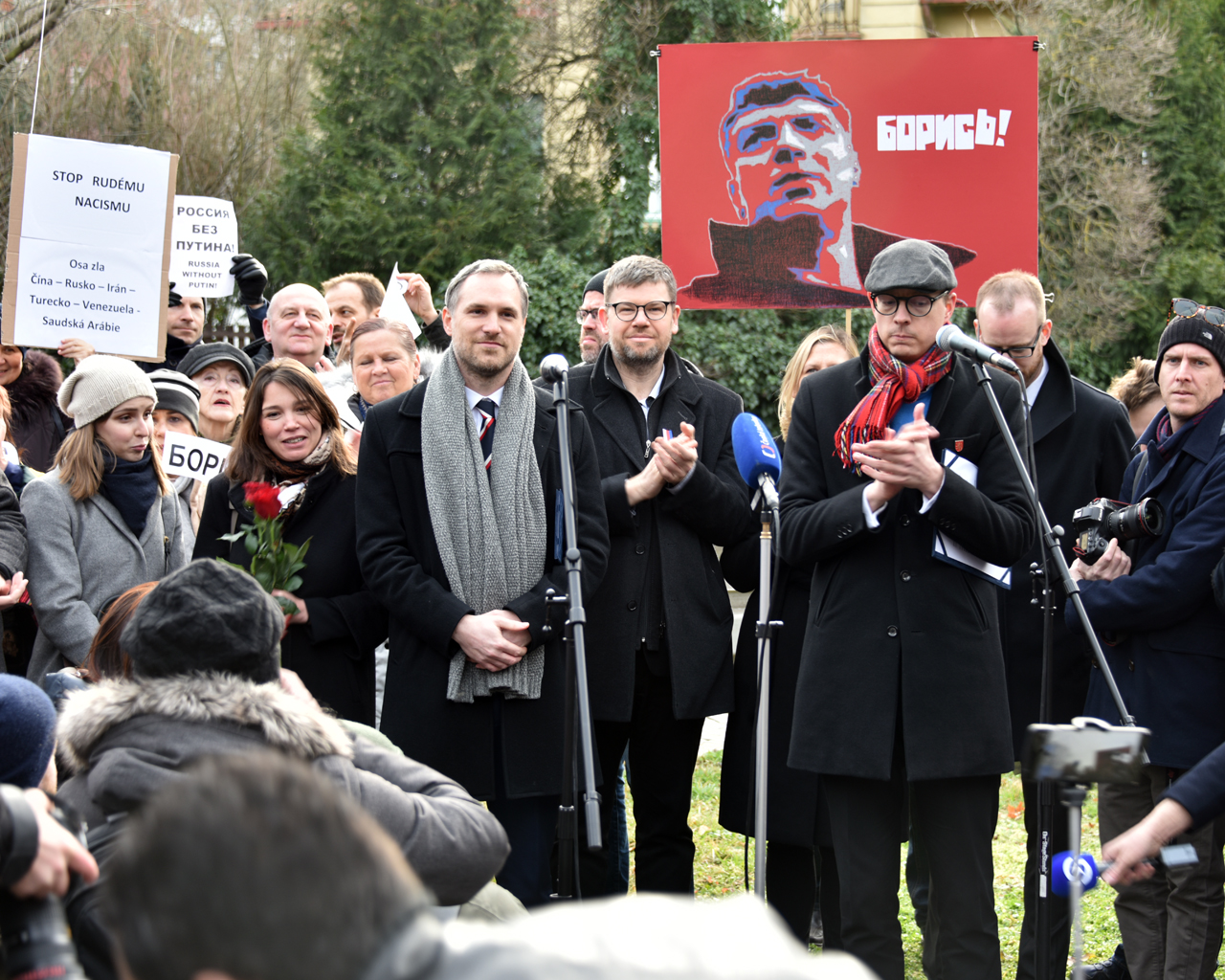
Boris Nemtsov Square (Feb 27, 2020)

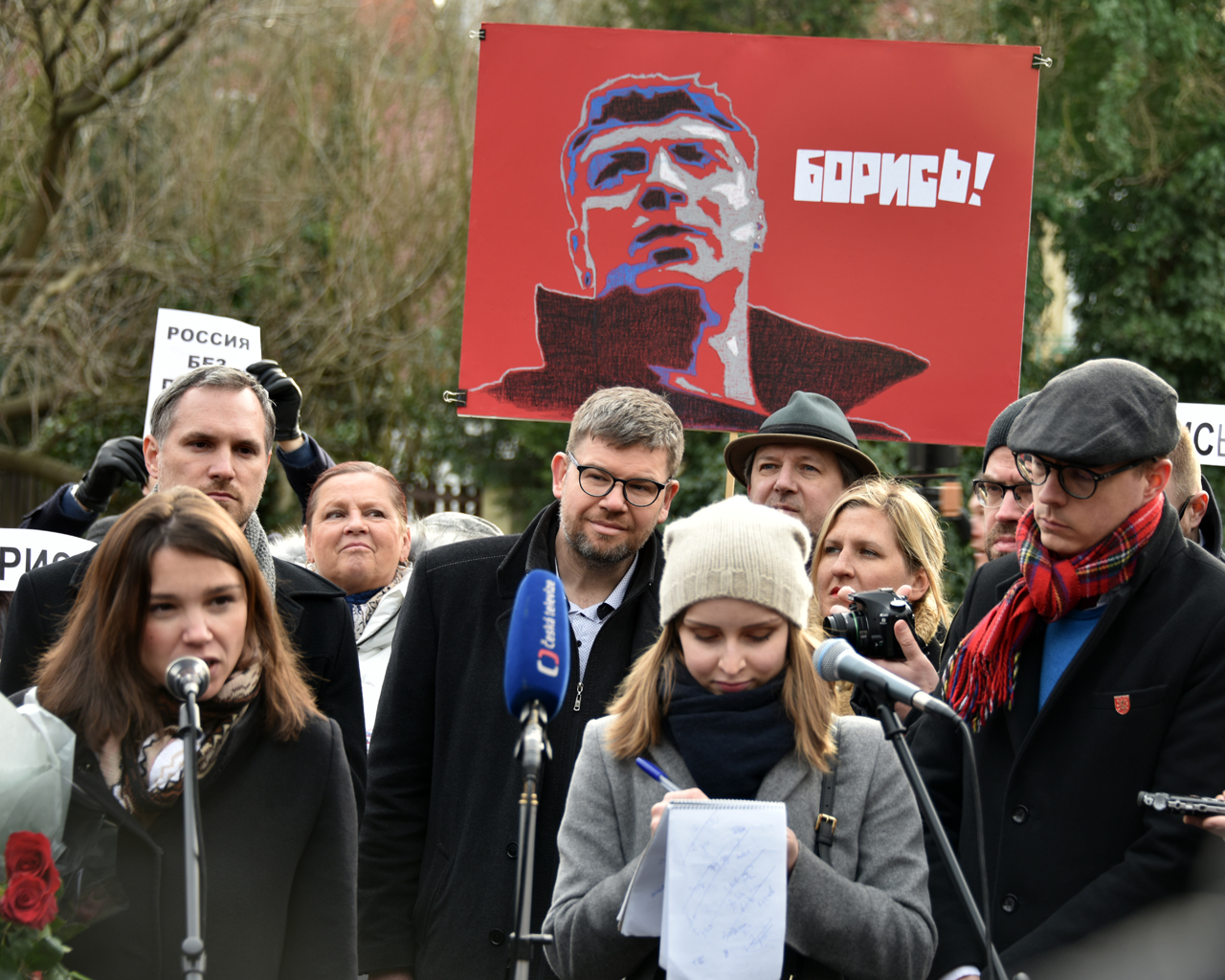
Boris Nemtsov Square (Feb 27, 2020)

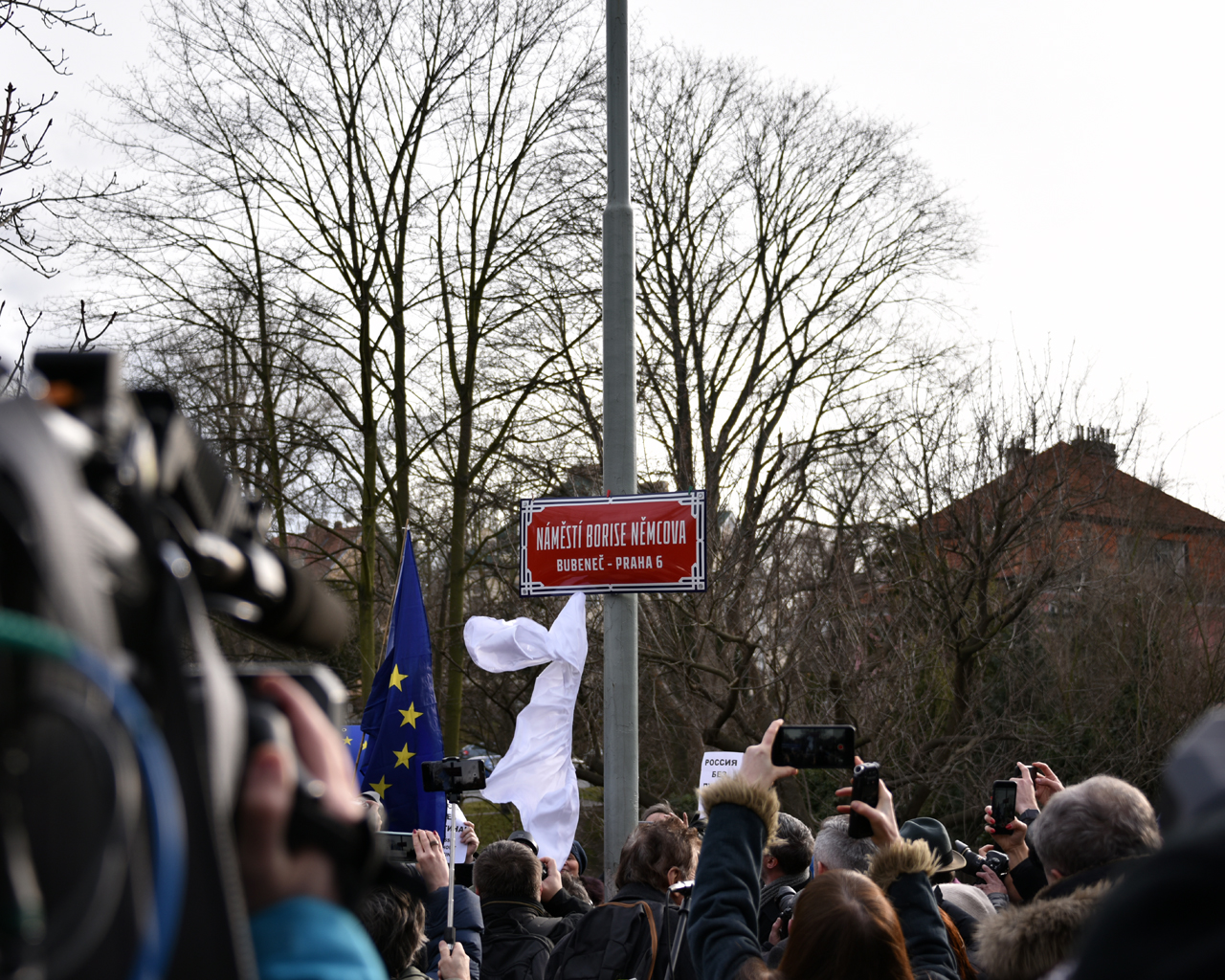
Boris Nemtsov Square (Feb 27, 2020)

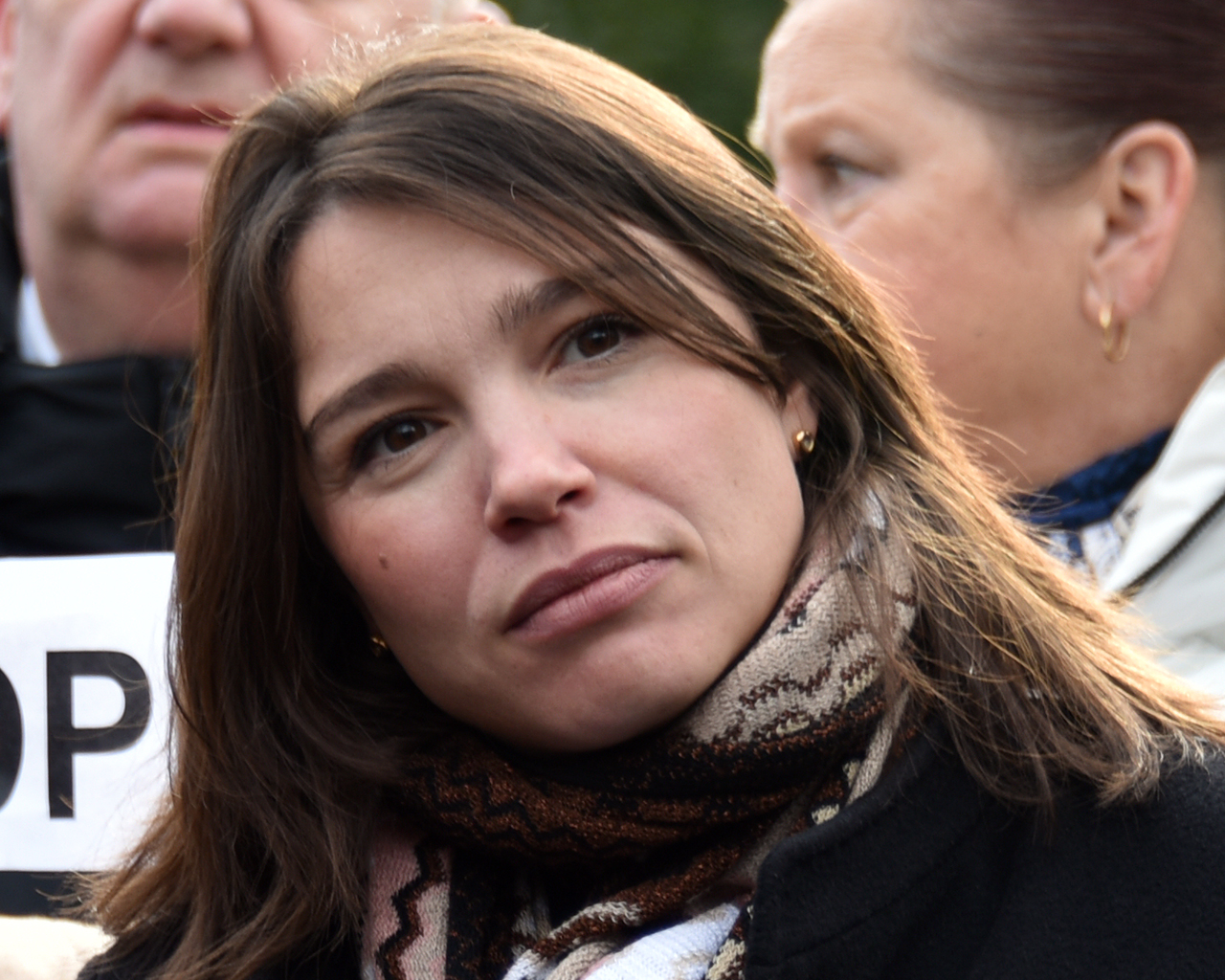
Zhanna Nemtsova, daughter of Boris Nemtsov

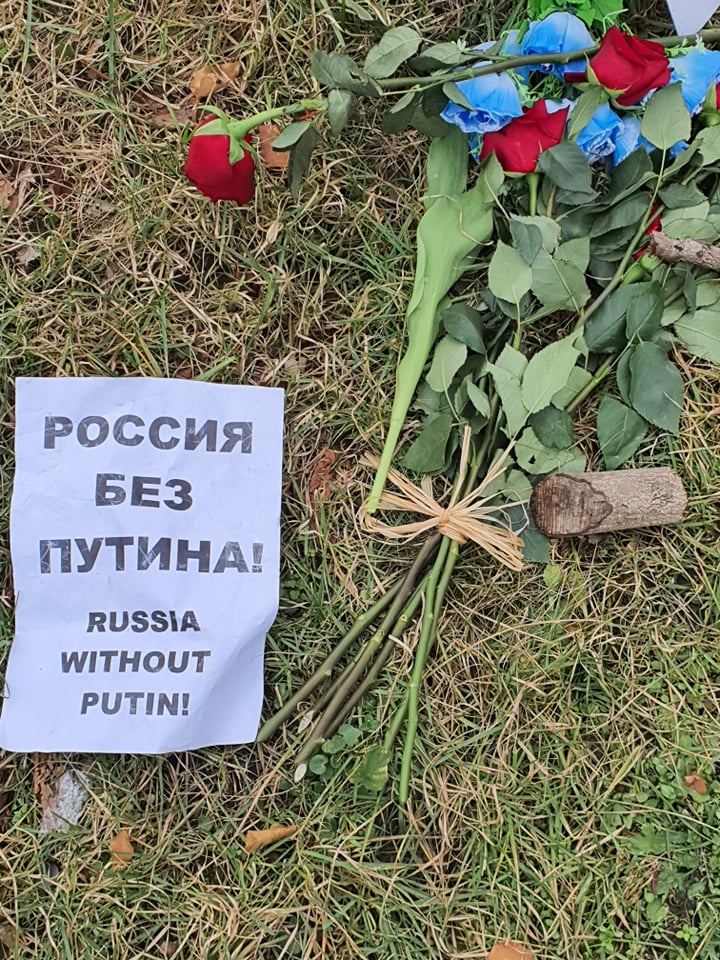
"Russia without Putin" (Feb 27, 2020)

=== Russia's reaction ===
According to the Russian news agency TASS, Russian presidential spokesman Dmitry Peskov said that in addition to honouring the memory of Boris Nemtsov, Prague should also remember the Soviet soldiers who died during the liberation of Czechia from the fascists, ignoring the fact that the Czech Republic takes care of 4224 war graves, memorials or monuments of fallen Soviet soldiers. Russian diplomatic spokeswoman Maria Zakharova also commented on the renaming, saying that "the statement of the Prague authorities is some nonsense, one could not expect more absurdity."

The Russian embassy changed its delivery address to 34 Korunovační Street a few months after the square was renamed in 2020. This address is located 400 metres away, next to the embassy's second building, which houses its consular section.

In April 2020, the mayor of Prague, Zdeněk Hřib, was given police protection days after a news report suggested he was the target of an assassination plot.

=== International acclaim ===
The independent website Free Russia wrote about the upcoming act in advance on 7 February, the Voice of America on 9 February, and Expats.cz on 10 February. The renaming of the square after the assassinated Russian politician provoked widespread international coverage, with The Guardian reporting on the great symbolic significance of the act also in advance on February 11.

Reuters, CNN and BBC World Service, Radio Free Europe/Radio Liberty and the independent daily The Moscow Times also reported on Prague's Boris Nemtsov Square Current Time TV carried a pictorial report and a speech by the Prague mayor Zdeněk Hřib and Zhanna Nemtsova.

== Memorial site to Alexei Navalny ==
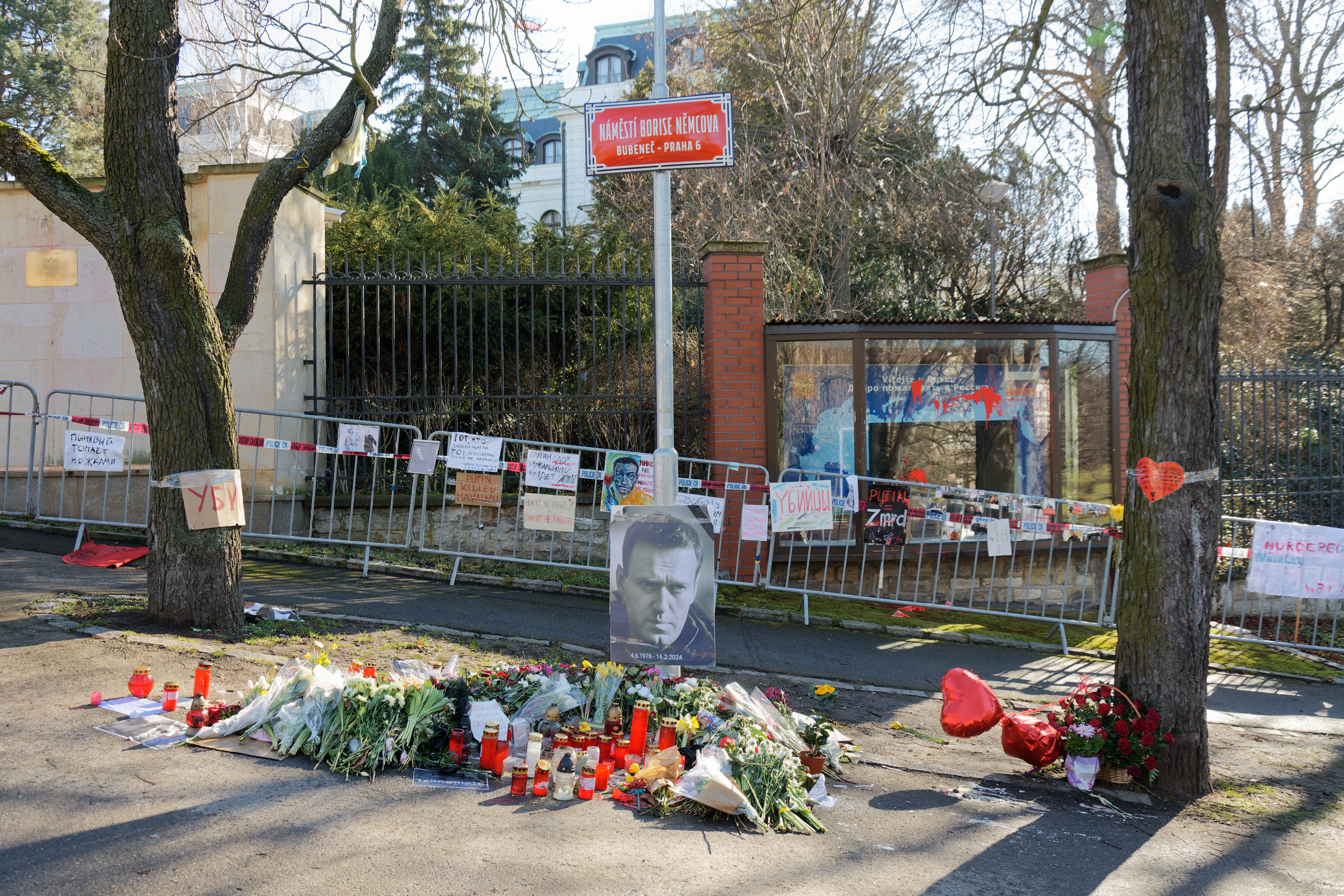

Following the death of the leading Russian opposition politician Alexei Navalny in February 2024, a memorial site was created here to honour his memory. Hundreds of people gathered here, bringing flowers, candles and banners with slogans such as Putin killed Navalny, It was murder and We will not forget and we will not forgive.

== Boris Nemtsov Squares elsewhere ==
In Washington, D.C., USA, a section of the street in front of the Russian embassy has been named Boris Nemtsov Plaza since 2018. Boris Nemtsov Square is also located in Vilnius, Lithuania, and a park near the Russian embassy in Kyiv was renamed after Nemtsov.

== Anna Politkovskaya promenade ==
In addition to Boris Nemtsov, another prominent Russian personality - Anna Politkovskaya, a journalist for the opposition newspaper Novaya Gazeta who covered, among other things, Russia's military involvement in Chechnya and who was assassinated in 2006 - was added to the Prague local directory on February 27, 2020.

"The murders of Politkovskaya and Nemstov demonstrated an inexorable process of the centralization of power in the Kremlin, the repression of human rights and independent journalism, and the use of regime propaganda to demonize all opponents and to whip up nationalist hatred", said National Endowment for Democracy President Carl Gershman.

Prague has joined the list of cities honoring the name of Politkovskaya - there is also Politkovskaya Street in Tbilisi, Rue Anna Politkovskaia in Toulouse, Place Anna Politkovskaïa – located in the Paris suburb of Montreuil and in the Villa Doria Pamphilj park in Rome, a small square was named after the Russian journalist in 2007. The hall for press conferences in the European Parliament is named after Anna Politkovskaya.

The promenade by the Governor's Summer Palace in Stromovka, near the newly renamed Nemtsov Square, is named after her. "It's a good step, very human and generous," said Vitaly Yaroshevsky, a former associate of the murdered journalist and deputy editor-in-chief of Novaya Gazeta, who came to see the opening of the new promenade.

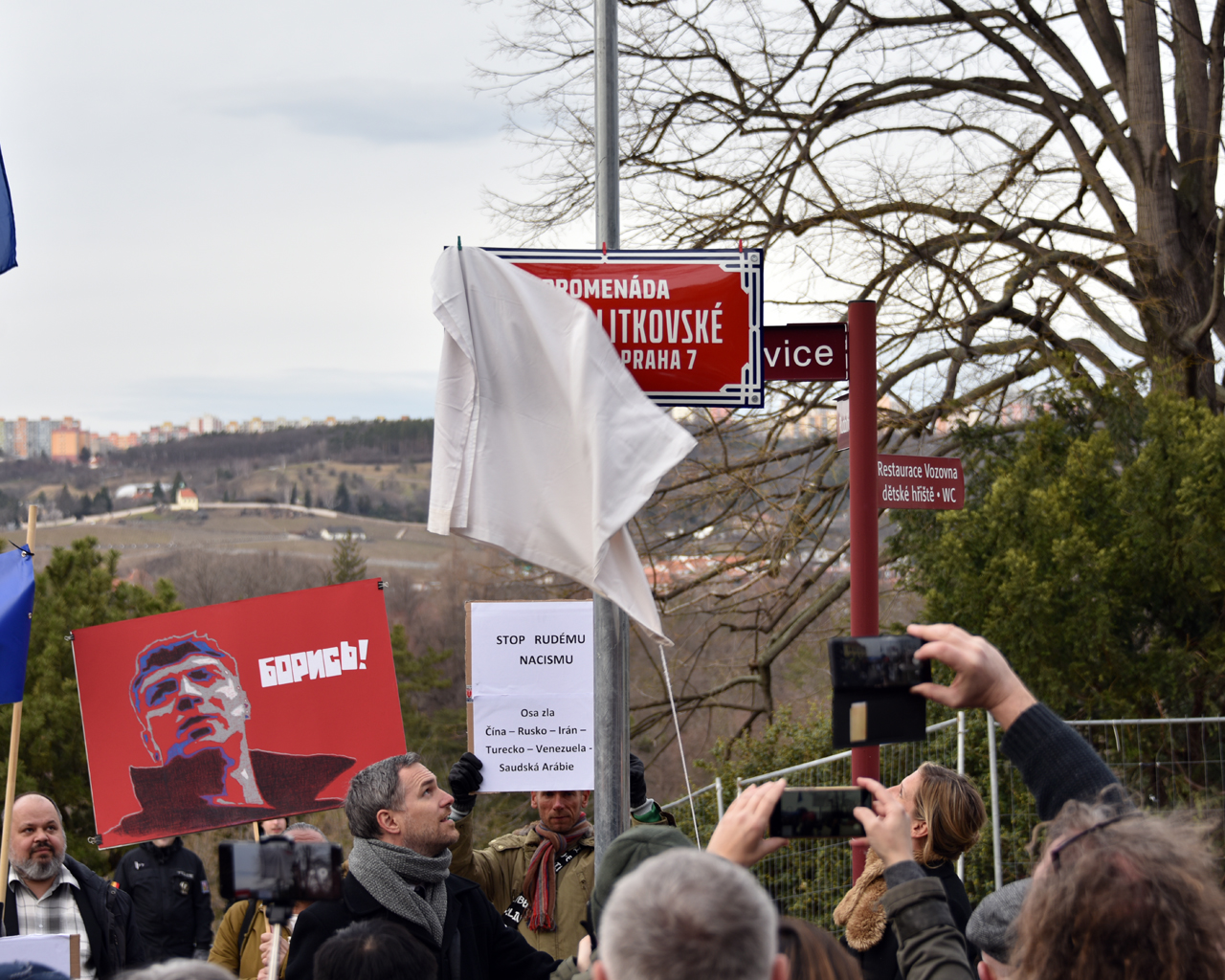

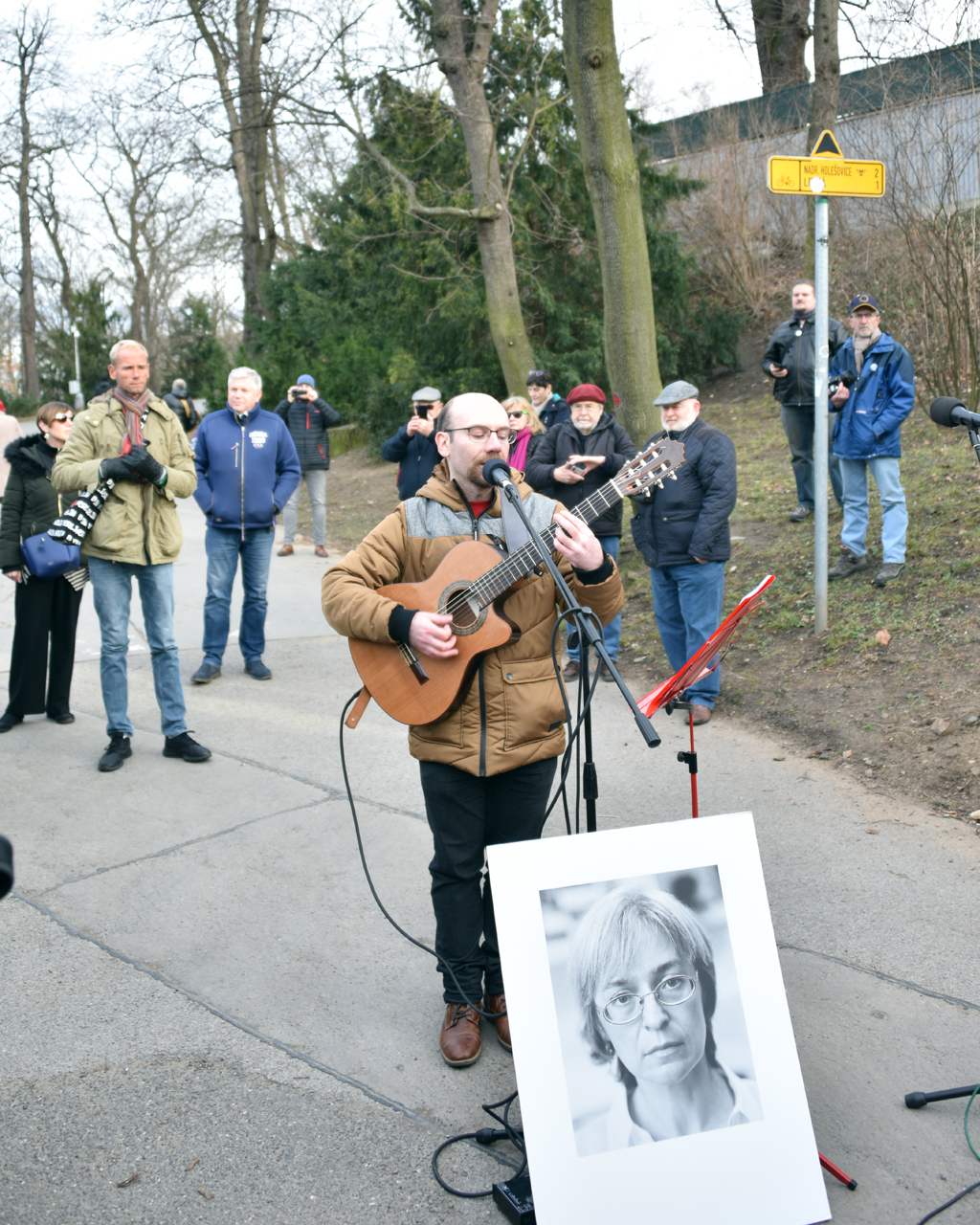

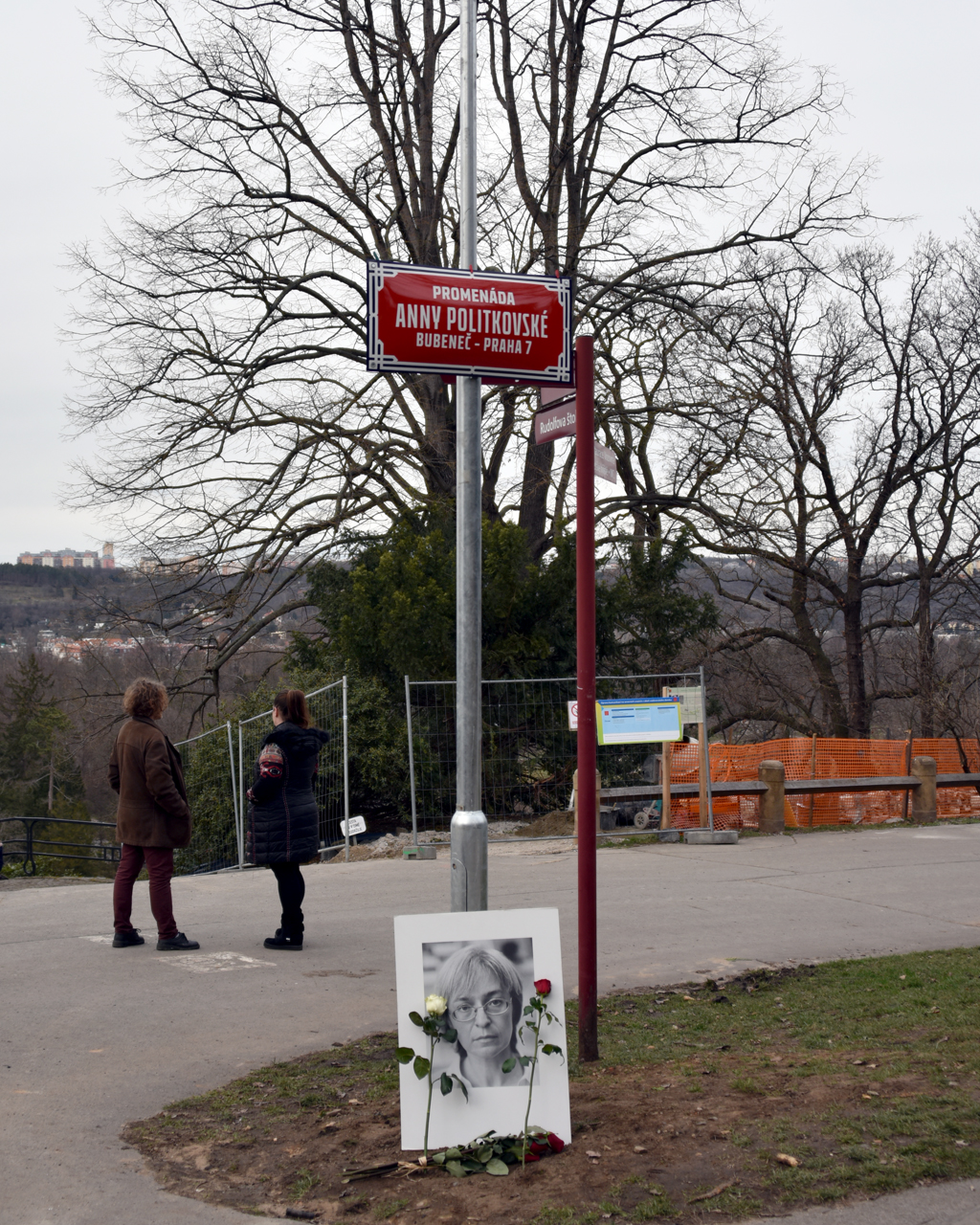

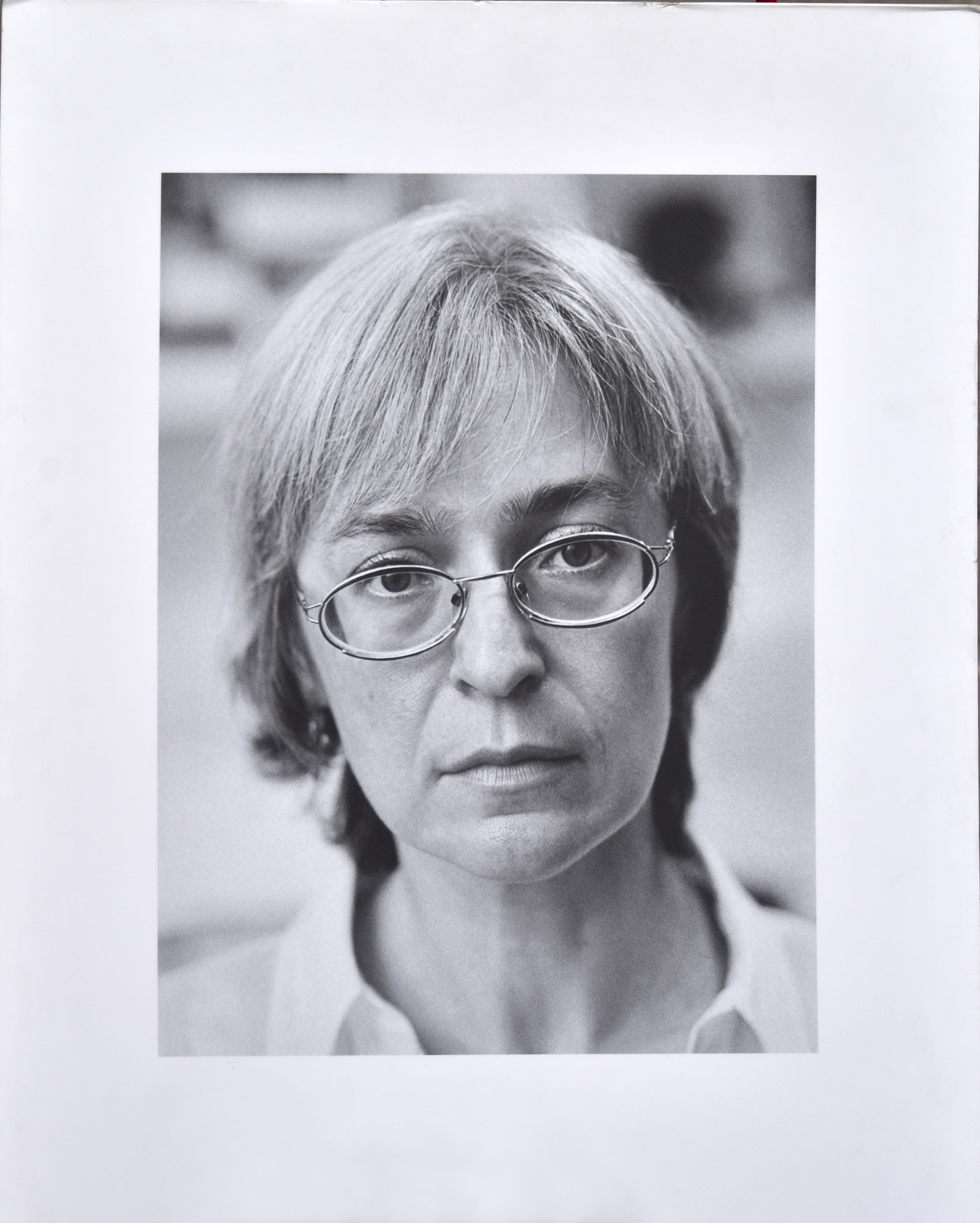
(detail)

== Alexei Navalny Lookout ==
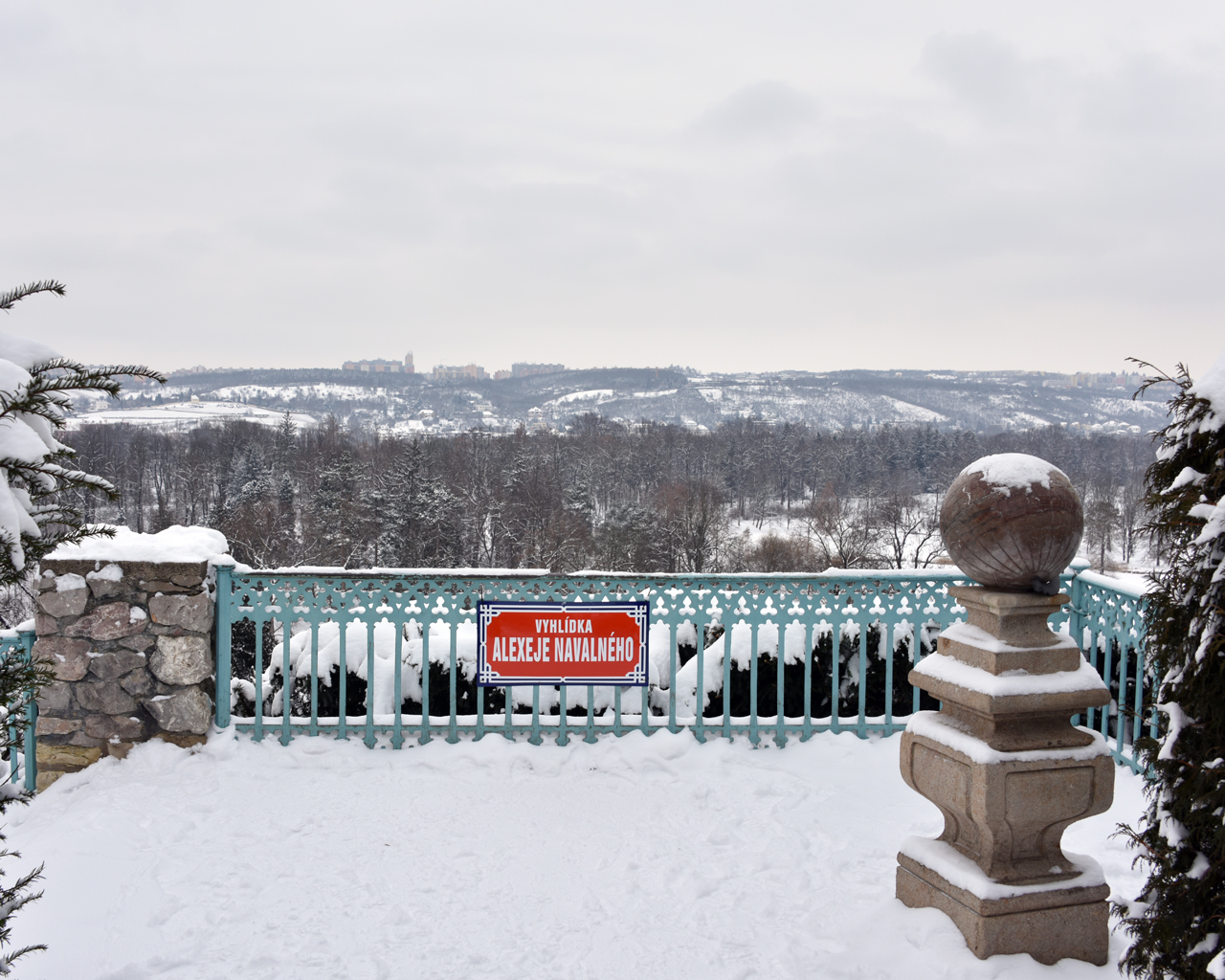
Alexei Navalny Lookout (Praha 2021)

In February 2021 somebody has put up an unofficial street sign reading “Alexei Navalny Lookout” by Prague’s Stromovka Park. The sign is very near the city’s Russian Embassy and between the actually existing Boris Nemtsov Square and Anna Politkovskaya Promenade.
