= Nemtsov (film) =

- Немцов
- Directed by: Vladimir V. Kara-Murza
- Written by: Renat Davletgildeev
- Release date: 2016
- Running time: 66 min
- Country: Russia
- Languages: Russian, English

Nemtsov is a documentary film about Boris Nemtsov, the Russian opposition leader who was assassinated in Moscow on February 27, 2015. It was written, directed, and narrated by Vladimir Kara-Murza, a Russian journalist and historian and a longtime friend and colleague of Nemtsov. The executive producer of the film is Renat Davletgildeev, former deputy editor-in-chief of TV Rain.

== Story ==
Nemtsov chronicles the life and career of Boris Nemtsov from his work as a scientist and his activism in opposition to a nuclear plant in Gorky in the late Soviet period to his meteoric political rise in post-Soviet Russia, when he was elected to Parliament, implemented market reforms as governor of Nizhny Novgorod, was invited to become Russia’s deputy prime minister, and was widely seen as a future successor to President Boris Yeltsin; as well as in his later years as a leader of the democratic opposition in Vladimir Putin’s Russia. The documentary is primarily narrated through interviews with people who knew and worked with Nemtsov and contains rare archival footage, including from the Nemtsov family.

Kara-Murza described his film as “a portrait of Boris Nemtsov as he was; without slander, without propaganda, without the clichés and the lies… the real Nemtsov, not the caricature image created by the Kremlin.”

The film includes no direct mention of Nemtsov’s assassination. As the authors explained, “it is not about death. It is about the life of a man who could have been president of Russia.”

== Screenings ==
The film was first shown at the Boris Nemtsov Forum in Berlin on October 9, 2016; the Russian premiere was held in Nizhny Novgorod on November 30, 2016. Nemtsov has been screened in 37 cities in Russia, as well as in other countries in Europe and in North America. The screenings were attended by members of Russian regional legislatures, members of the European Parliament, and members of several national parliaments, including the U.S. Congress.

The Russian version of the film was publicly released online on October 9, 2017; the English-subtitled version was released on February 27, 2018.

== Participants ==
- Boris Abramovich
- Viktor Aksyuchits
- Vladimir Bukovsky
- Sergei Dorenko
- Lilia Dubovaya
- Tatiana Grishina
- Dmitry Gudkov
- Mikhail Kasyanov
- Irina Khakamada
- Mikhail Khodorkovsky
- Yevgeni Kiselev
- Yuri Lebedev
- Viktor Lysov
- Igor Maskaev
- John McCain
- Boris Nadezhdin
- Alexei Navalny
- Raisa Nemtsova
- Zhanna Nemtsova
- Olga Shorina
- Oleg Sysuev
- Strobe Talbott
- Ilya Yashin
- Sergei Yastrzhembsky
- Grigory Yavlinsky
- Valentin Yumashev
- Tatyana Yumasheva
- Nina Zvereva

== Reviews ==
According to Russian film critic Artemy Troitsky, Nemtsov "is what the French call hommage, that is to say a tribute. As a tribute, I think it is impeccable." Television commentator Arina Borodina noted that the authors have done "colossal archival work" and that the film depicts "a large, colorful, powerful, courageous life." "The film shows that Boris Nemtsov was a politician with a large degree of openness and sincerity, and that such position is, historically speaking, a winning one," wrote political analyst Alexander Morozov. Nemtsov's daughter Zhanna described Kara-Murza's documentary as "a film made by a friend about a friend"; in her words, "it is clear that this is not a detached view, it is a film Kara-Murza made about a loved one."

== Awards ==
In January 2018 for his work on Nemtsov Vladimir Kara-Murza was awarded the Sakharov Prize for Journalism as an Act of Conscience.
