= IRI Freedom Award =

Freedom Award
- Awarded for: "individuals who have worked to advance freedom and democracy in their countries and around the world"
- Country: United States
- Presented by: International Republican Institute
- First award: 1995
- Final award: 2015
- Website: https://www.iri.org/events/freedom-award-2023/

IRI Freedom Award is the annual award "to honor individuals who have worked to advance freedom and democracy in their countries and around the world" established by the International Republican Institute in 1995.

== Recipients ==
Year	Image	Recipient	Nationality
1995		Alfredo Cristiani	El Salvador
1995		Miguel Obando y Bravo	Nicaragua
1996		Colin Powell	United States
1997		Ronald Reagan	United States
1998		Robert J. Dole	United States
1999		Aung San Suu Kyi	Burma
1999		Natan Sharansky	Israel
2001		Richard B. Cheney	United States
2001		Lynne Cheney	United States
2003		Bill Frist	United States
2003		Hamid Karzai	Afghanistan
2004		Condoleezza Rice	United States
2004		Sérgio Vieira de Mello, posthumously	United Nations
2005		George W. Bush	United States
2005		Pope John Paul II, posthumously	Roman Catholic Church
2006		Laura Bush	United States
2006		Ellen Johnson Sirleaf	Liberia
2007		Elías Antonio Saca González	El Salvador
2009		Henry A. Kissinger	United States
2010		George P. Shultz	United States
2011		James A. Baker III	United States
2011		Lawrence Eagleburger, posthumously	United States
2014		George H. W. Bush	United States
2014		Ukrainian Maidan Movement	Ukraine
2015		John Boehner	United States
2015		Mo Ibrahim	Sudan
2015		Boris Nemtsov, posthumously	Russia
