= Boris Nemtsov =

Russian scientist, statesman, and politician (1959–2015)

- Борис Немцов
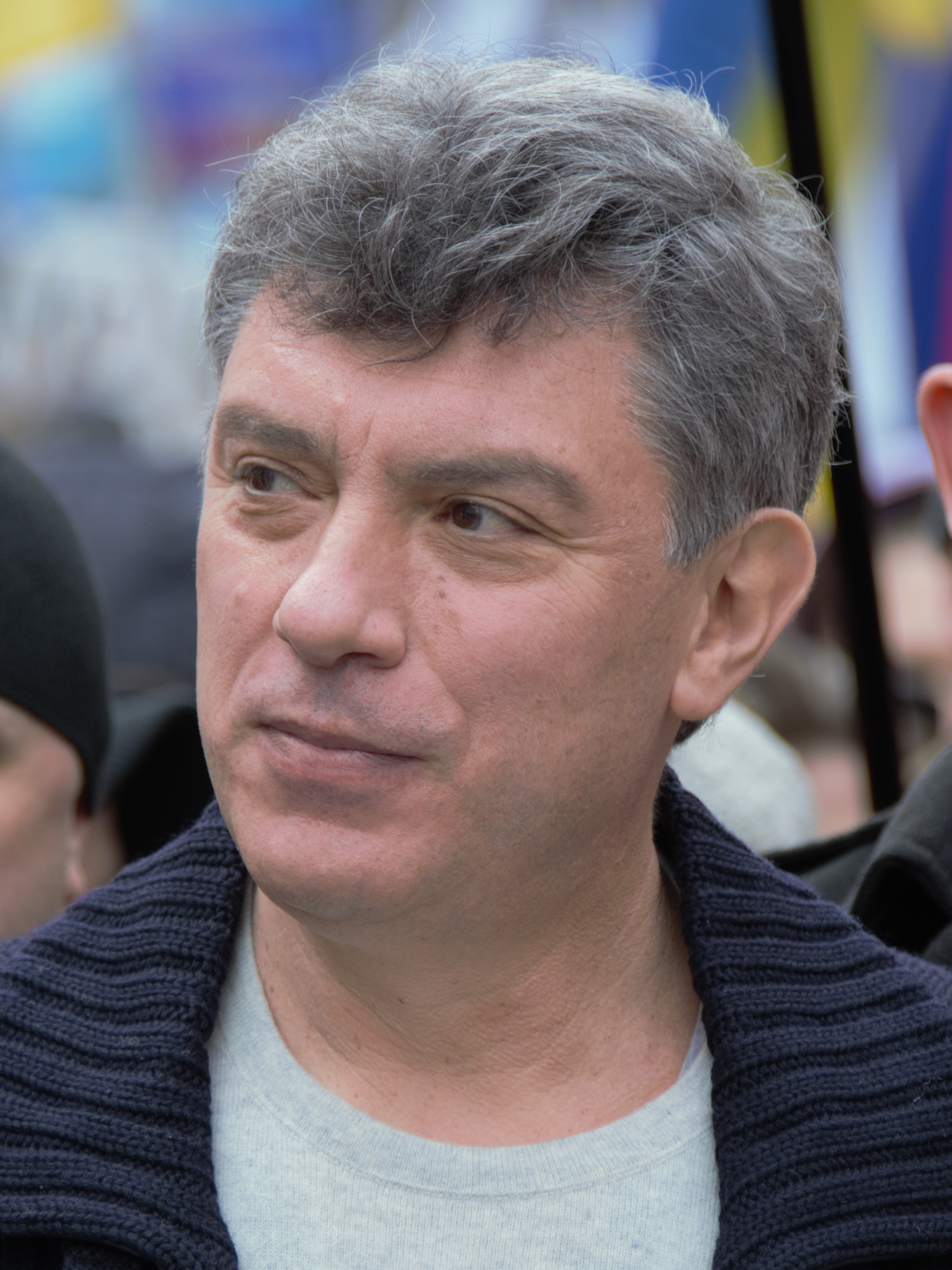
- Nemtsov in 2014

Deputy Prime Minister of Russia
- In office 28 April 1998 – 28 August 1998
- President: Boris Yeltsin
- Prime Minister: Sergey Kirienko; Viktor Chernomyrdin (acting)

First Deputy Prime Minister of Russia
- In office 17 March 1997 – 28 April 1998 Serving with Anatoly Chubais
- President: Boris Yeltsin
- Prime Minister: Viktor Chernomyrdin
- Preceded by: Alexei Bolshakov; Viktor Ilyushin; Vladimir Potanin
- Succeeded by: Yuri Maslyukov; Vadim Gustov; Sergei Stepashin

1st Governor of Nizhny Novgorod Oblast
- In office 30 November 1991 – 17 March 1997
- Preceded by: Position established
- Succeeded by: Ivan Sklyarov

Personal details
- Born: Boris Yefimovich Nemtsov; 9 October 1959 Sochi, Russian SFSR, Soviet Union
- Died: 27 February 2015 (aged 55) Moscow, Russia
- Cause of death: Assassination
- Resting place: Troyekurovskoye Cemetery
- Party: Union of Right Forces (1999–2008); Solidarnost (2008–2010); People's Freedom (2010–2012); RPR-PARNAS (2012–2015)
- Spouse: Raisa Ahmetovna (separated)
- Children: 4, including Zhanna
- Education: Gorky State University
- Awards: Medal of the Order "For Merit to the Fatherland" (second degree, 1995); Order of Prince Yaroslav the Wise (fifth degree, 2006, Ukraine); Order of Liberty (Ukraine, posthumously); IRI Freedom Award (US, posthumously)
- Boris Nemtsov's voice recorded March 2013
- Other offices held: 2013–2015: Member of the Russian regional parliament of Yaroslavl Oblast; 2012–2013: Member of the Russian Opposition Coordination Council; 2012–2015: Co-chairman of the Republican Party of Russia – People's Freedom Party; 2005–2006: Free lance adviser to Ukrainian president Viktor Yushchenko; 2000–2003: Leader of the Union of Right Forces parliamentary group; 2000: Deputy Chairman of the State Duma; 1999–2003: Member of the State Duma from the 117th single-member district; 1997–1998: Member of the Security Council; 1997: Federal Minister of Fuel and Energy; 1993–1997: Member of the Federation Council from Nizhny Novgorod Oblast; 1991–1997: Governor of Nizhny Novgorod Oblast; 1991: Member of the Council of the Republics of the Supreme Soviet of the Soviet Union; 1991–1994: Plenipotentiary Representative of the President of the Russian Federation in Nizhny Novgorod Oblast; 1991–1993: Member of the Supreme Soviet of Russia; 1990–1993: People's Deputy of the Russian SFSR from Gorky district

Boris Yefimovich Nemtsov (Russian: Борис Ефимович Немцов [bɐˈrʲis jɪˈfʲiməvʲɪtɕ nʲɪmˈtsof]; 9 October 1959 – 27 February 2015) was a Russian physicist, liberal statesman and politician, opposition leader and outspoken critic of Vladimir Putin. Early in his political career, he was involved in the introduction of reforms into the Russian post-Soviet economy. In the 1990s under President Boris Yeltsin, he was the first governor of the Nizhny Novgorod Oblast (1991–1997). Later he worked in the government of Russia as Minister of Fuel and Energy (1997), Vice Premier of Russia and Security Council member from 1997 to 1998. In 1998, he founded the Young Russia movement. In 1998, he co-founded the coalition group Right Cause and in 1999, he co-formed Union of Right Forces, an electoral bloc and subsequently a political party. Nemtsov was also a member of the Congress of People's Deputies (1990), Federation Council (1993–97) and State Duma (1999–2003).

He was an outspoken critic of Vladimir Putin from 2000 until his assassination in 2015. He criticized Putin's government as an increasingly authoritarian, undemocratic regime, highlighting widespread embezzlement and profiteering ahead of the Sochi Olympics, and Russian political interference and military involvement in Ukraine. After 2008, Nemtsov published in-depth reports detailing the corruption under Putin, which he connected directly with the President. As part of the same political struggle, Nemtsov was an active organizer of and participant in Dissenters' Marches, Strategy-31 civil actions and rallies "For Fair Elections".

He was assassinated on 27 February 2015, on a bridge near the Kremlin in Moscow, with four shots fired from the back. At the time of his assassination, he was in Moscow helping to organize a rally against the Russian military intervention in Ukraine and the Russian financial crisis. At the same time, he was working on a report demonstrating that Russian troops were fighting alongside pro-Russian rebels in eastern Ukraine, which the Kremlin had been denying, and was unpopular externally but also in Russia. In the weeks before his death, he expressed fear that Putin would have him killed. In late June 2017, five Chechnya-born men were found guilty by a jury in a Moscow court for agreeing to kill Nemtsov in exchange for 15 million rubles (US$253,000); neither the identity nor whereabouts of the person who hired them is officially known.

== Early life ==
Boris Yefimovich Nemtsov was born in Sochi in 1959 to Yefim Davidovich Nemtsov and Dina Yakovlevna Nemtsova (née Eidman). His mother, a physician, is Jewish.

Nemtsov was raised in Gorky, now Nizhny Novgorod. His parents divorced when he was five years old. In his autobiography, Nemtsov recounts that his Russian Orthodox paternal grandmother had him baptized as an infant, and that he became a practicing Orthodox Christian. He found out about his baptism many years later.

== Studies and academic career ==
From 1976 to 1981, Nemtsov studied physics at State University of Gorky in the city of Gorky, receiving a degree in 1981.

In 1985, he defended his dissertation for a PhD in Physics and Mathematics from the State University of Gorky. Until 1990, he worked as a research fellow at the Radiophysical Research Institute, and produced more than 60 academic publications related to quantum physics, thermodynamics and acoustics.

He proposed a theoretical model for an acoustic laser and a novel design of antennas for space probes.

== Political career, 1986–2004 ==
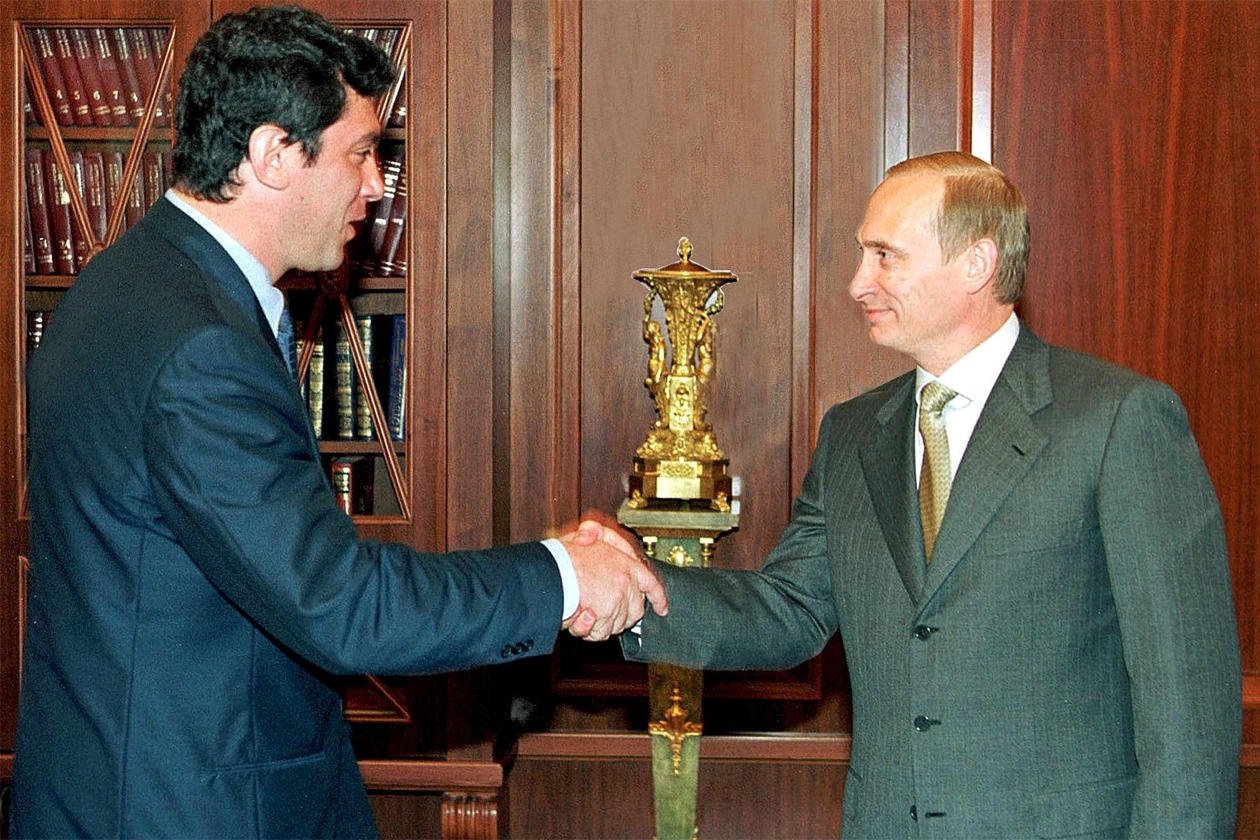
Boris Nemtsov, leader of the Union of Right Forces parliamentary party, with President Vladimir Putin, July 2000

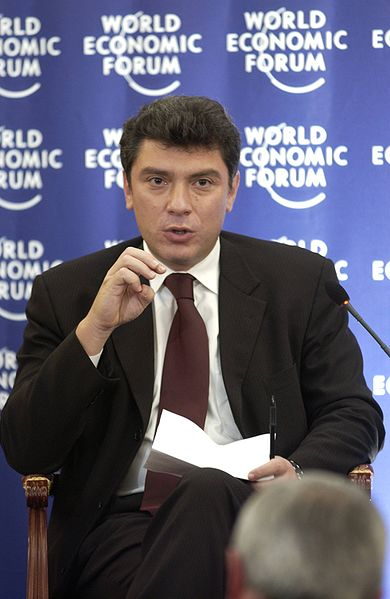
Nemtsov at the World Economic Forum, 2 October 2003, Moscow

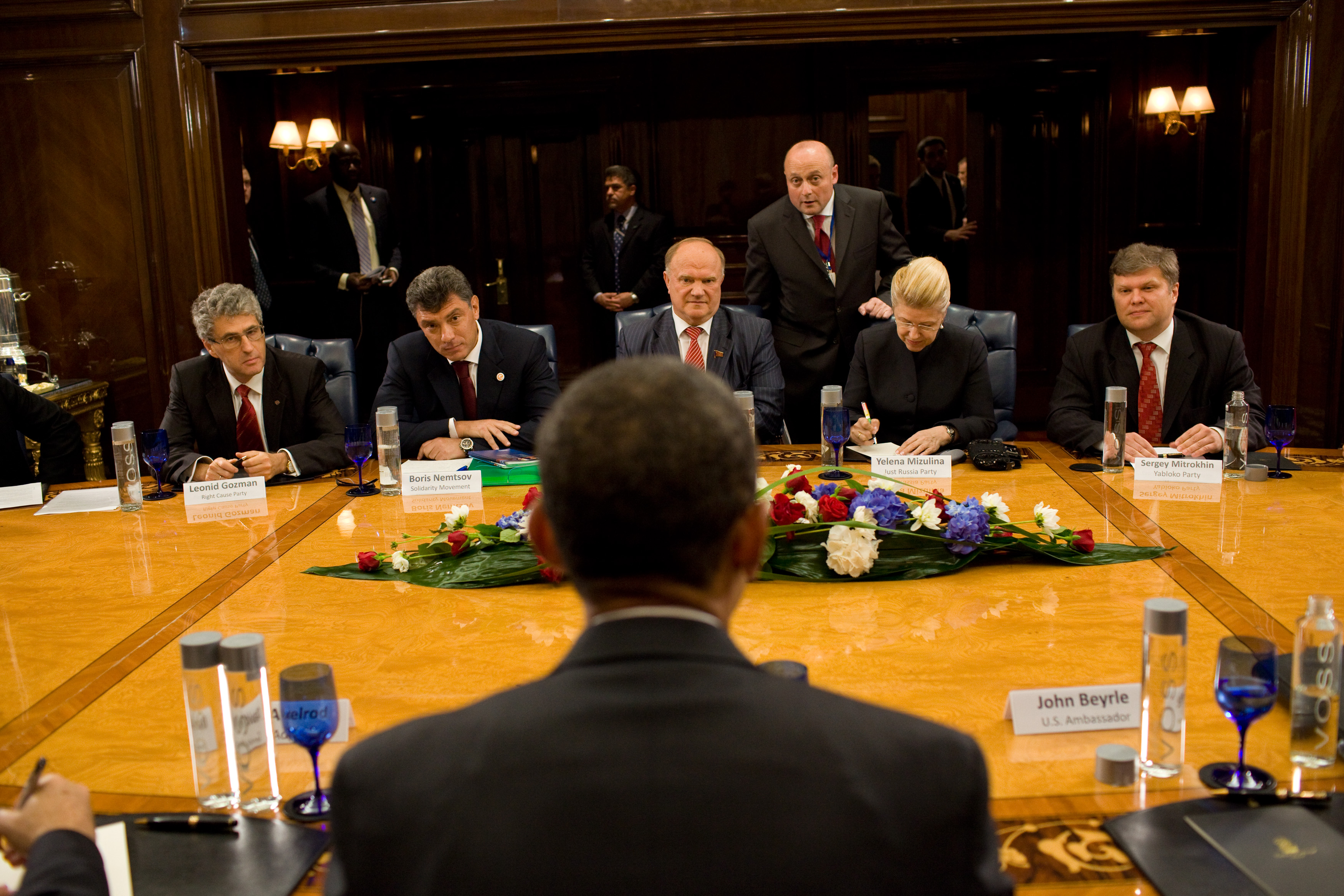
Barack Obama and Russian political leaders, namely liberals Leonid Gozman, Boris Nemtsov, communist Gennady Zyuganov, social democrat Yelena Mizulina and social liberal Sergey Mitrokhin

In the wake of the Chernobyl disaster in 1986, Nemtsov organized a protest movement in his hometown which effectively prevented construction of a nuclear-fired boiler plant in the region.

In 1989, Nemtsov unsuccessfully ran for the Soviet Congress of People's Deputies on a reform platform which for the time was quite radical, promoting ideas such as multiparty democracy and private enterprise.

In Russia's first free elections of 1990, he ran for the Supreme Soviet of the Russian Republic representing Gorky, later renamed Nizhny Novgorod. Nemtsov was elected, the only non-communist candidate. He defeated twelve others. Once in Parliament he joined the "Reform Coalition" and "Centre-Left" political groups.

In the Russian parliament, Nemtsov was on the legislative committee, working on agricultural reform and the liberalization of foreign trade. In this position he met Boris Yeltsin, who was impressed with his work. During the August 1991 attempted coup by Soviet hardliners, Nemtsov vehemently supported the president and stood by him during the entire clash. After those events, Yeltsin rewarded Nemtsov's loyalty with the position of presidential representative in his home region of Nizhny Novgorod.

In November 1991, Yeltsin appointed him Governor of Nizhny Novgorod Oblast. He was re-elected to that position by popular vote in December 1995. His tenure was marked by a wide-ranging, chaotic free market reform program nicknamed "Laboratory of Reform" for Nizhny Novgorod and resulted in significant economic growth for the region. Nemtsov's reforms won praise from former British Prime Minister Margaret Thatcher, who visited Nizhny Novgorod in 1993.

From the very outset of Nemtsov's tenure as governor, according to Serge Schmemann, Nemtsov "embarked on a whirlwind campaign to transform the region, drawing enthusiastic support from a host of Western agencies." Although the province was closed to foreigners for years and "there wasn't even enough paper money for the privatization program", he was optimistic about Moscow's future and consequently "pushed ahead on his own, even issuing his own money – chits, to be eventually exchanged for rubles that came to be known as 'Nemtsovki.'" Nemtsov very openly looked to the West as a model for Russia's future. Nemtsov, Schmemann observed, adopted the westernized title "Governor" rather than the Russian "Head of Administration".

After Nemtsov's death, Leonid Bershidsky recalled meeting him in 1992 during his tenure as governor. "A brilliant young physicist", recounted Bershidsky, "he was trying to practice liberal economics in a gloomy Soviet-era industrial city that had long been off-limits to foreigners." Bershidsky described his eloquence and demeanor as that of "a Hollywood movie politician transplanted into the Russian hinterland."

In December 1993, Nemtsov was elected to the Federation Council, the upper house of the Russian Parliament. During the election campaign he was backed by Russia's Choice and Yabloko, which were then the principal liberal parties in the country.

In 1996, Nemtsov brought Yeltsin a petition with one million signatures against the First Chechen War, which he had signed himself.

In March 1997, Nemtsov was appointed First Deputy Prime Minister of Russia, with special responsibility for reform of the energy sector. He was tasked with restructuring the monopolies and reforming the housing and social sectors. He became popular with the public and appeared favoured to become President of Russia in 2000. Boris Yeltsin introduced him to Bill Clinton as his chosen successor. In the summer of 1997, opinion polls gave Nemtsov over 50% support as a potential presidential candidate. His political career, however, suffered a blow in August 1998 following the crash of the Russian stock-market and the ensuing economic crisis.

Nemtsov had worked in Moscow's "White House" for only a year and a half, although he stated he had some success. He ended the corrupt act of stashing budget funds in commercial banks. He also managed to introduce an anti-corruption law for all state purchases in the government. He also helped to end the illegal export of raw materials and made oil sales more transparent. "And, most importantly, while I was the minister responsible for fuel and energy, oil was at barely 10 US dollars per barrel, and still we managed to save Russia. Things were difficult, what with social unrest, strikes, the war in Chechnya, the 'default', and still – let me repeat – we did save Russia."

As part of Anatoly Chubais' economic team, Nemtsov was forced to resign his position of Deputy Prime Minister. After the dismissal of Prime Minister Victor Chernomyrdin in 1998, Nemtsov was reappointed Deputy Prime Minister, but resigned shortly afterwards when Yeltsin dissolved the government. According to The Economist, Nemtsov, unlike many other top government figures, "emerged from the troubled 1990s with his reputation intact."

As early as 1998, Nemtsov had a personal website on RuNet. Nemtsov.ru sought to provide information to its users that was not available elsewhere and also was one of the first attempts by a politician to establish two-way communication with an audience.

In August 1999, Nemtsov became one of the co-founders of the Union of Right Forces, a then new liberal-democratic coalition which received nearly 6 million votes, or 8.6% of the vote, in the parliamentary elections in December 1999. Nemtsov himself was elected to the State Duma, or lower house of Parliament, and became its Deputy Speaker in February 2000. In May 2000, Sergei Kiriyenko resigned and Nemtsov was elected leader of the party and its parliamentary group. Over 70% of delegates at the Union of Rightist Forces congress in May 2001 confirmed him as party leader. According to Nemtsov, the Union "always consisted of two factions, a Nemtsov faction and a Chubais faction", with the former "based on principles and ideology whereas the Chubais faction was pragmatic, existing by the rules of realpolitik." On Nemtsov's recommendation, Boris Brevnov became Chairman of the Board of RAO UES of Russia.

In 2002, his name appeared on a list of several individuals the hostage-takers during the Moscow theater hostage crisis were willing to speak to directly. Nemtsov did not take part in the negotiations and later said that Putin had ordered him not to go.

By 2003, Nemtsov was in a difficult political position – while he vehemently believed President Vladimir Putin's policies were rolling back democracy and civic freedoms in Russia, he needed to collaborate with the powerful co-chairman of the Union of Rightist Forces, Anatoly Chubais, who favoured a conciliatory line towards the Kremlin. In the parliamentary elections of December 2003, the Union of Rightist Forces platform headed by both Nemtsov and Chubais received just 2.4 million votes, 4% of the total, and thus fell short of the 5% threshold necessary to enter Parliament and as a result lost its seats. In January 2004, Nemtsov resigned from the party leadership. He became Chairman of the Council of Directors of Neftianoi, an oil company, and also a political advisor to Ukrainian president Viktor Yuschenko.

== Later career, 2004–2015 ==
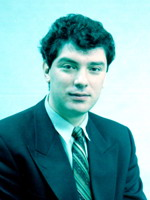
Nemtsov in 2008

Rally of the "For Russia without Lawlessness and Corruption" coalition, 2010

Rally of the "For Russia without Lawlessness and Corruption" coalition, 2011

In January 2004, Nemtsov co-authored an article in Nezavisimaya Gazeta entitled "Appeal to the Putinist Majority", with his longtime adviser and party colleague Vladimir V. Kara-Murza. This article warned of the danger of an impending Putin dictatorship. Later the same month, he co-founded "Committee 2008", an umbrella group of the Russian opposition which also included Garry Kasparov, Vladimir Bukovsky and other prominent liberals.

In February 2004, Nemtsov was appointed a director of the Neftyanoi Bank, and Chairman of Neftyanoi Concern, an oil firm and the bank's parent company. In December 2005, however, prosecutors announced an investigation of the bank following allegations of money laundering and fraud. Nemtsov subsequently resigned from both positions, saying that he wanted to minimize political fallout for the bank from his continuing involvement in Russian politics. Nemtsov also alleged that his bank perhaps was targeted because of his friendship and support of former Prime Minister Mikhail Kasyanov, who had stated his intention to run for president in 2008.

During the 2004 Ukrainian presidential elections, Nemtsov came out as a strong supporter of the eventual winner Viktor Yushchenko, while the Russian government backed his opponent, Viktor Yanukovych. Shortly after the Orange Revolution, as the elections and series of protests in Ukraine came to be called, Yushchenko appointed Nemtsov as an economic adviser. Nemtsov's main goal was to improve business ties between Ukraine and Russia, damaged after the Putin government strongly supported Yushchenko's opponent in the presidential election. Yushchenko's selection of Nemtsov was controversial owing to Nemtsov's vocal criticism of Putin.

The relationship between Nemtsov and the Ukrainian government became unstable in the middle of 2005 following accusations that Nemtsov had criticized Ukrainian cabinet decisions, and a group of legislators called for Yushchenko to fire Nemtsov. Despite the criticism, he remained as an economic adviser to Yushchenko until October 2006, when the office of the Ukrainian president announced that Nemtsov had been "relieved of his duties as a freelance presidential adviser".

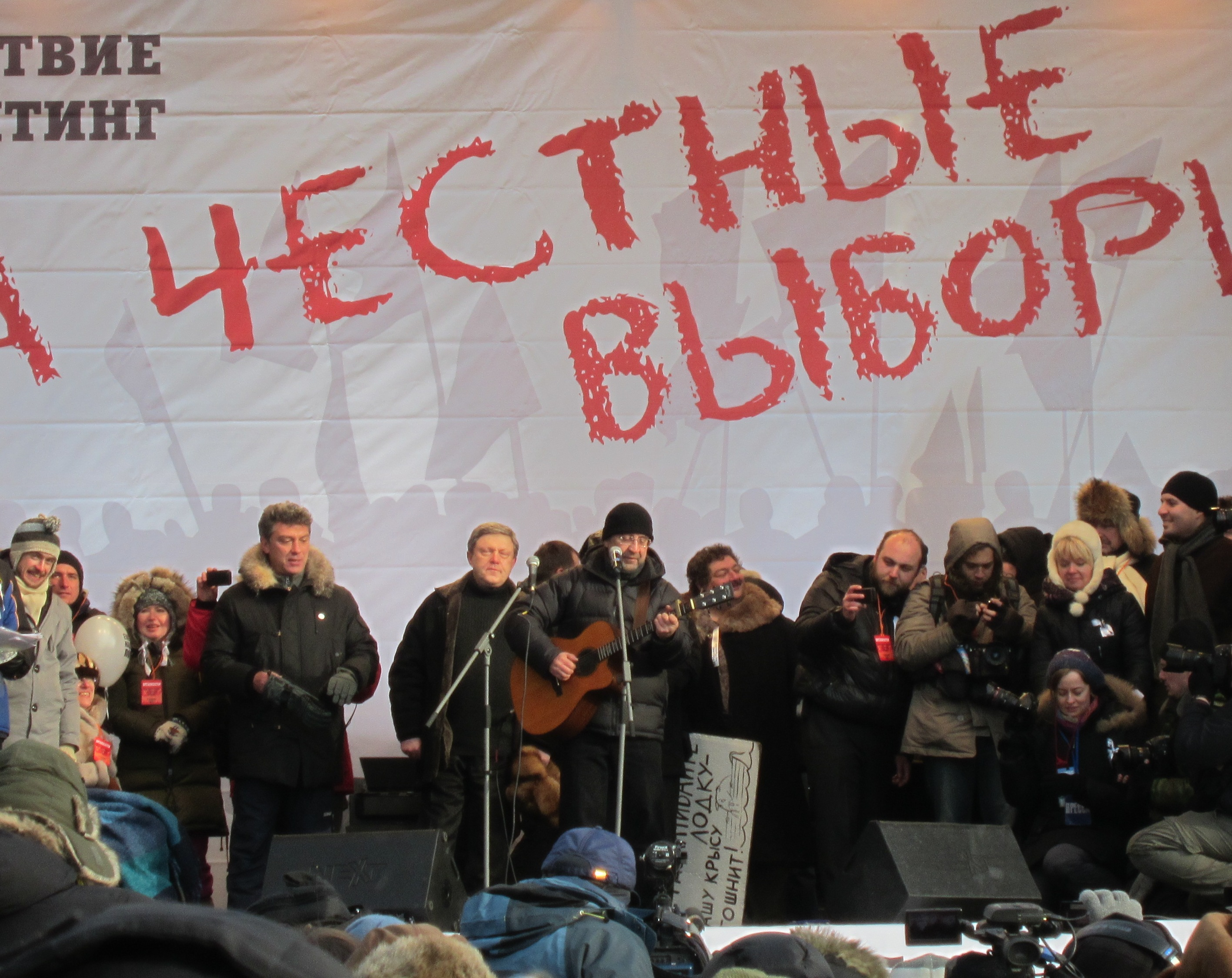
Moscow rally, Yakimanka Street, Bolotnaya Square, February 2012

Nemtsov was briefly a candidate for the presidency of Russia in the 2008 election. On 26 December 2007, Nemtsov withdrew his candidacy for the 2008 election, saying that he did not want to draw votes away from the other candidate of the "democratic opposition", Mikhail Kasyanov. Nemtsov said he was no longer running partly because of a belief that the government had predetermined the election's winner.

On 13 December 2008, Nemtsov and Garry Kasparov co-founded the political opposition movement Solidarnost (Solidarity). The organization hoped to unite the opposition forces in Russia. Nemtsov said in February 2011 that Solidarity had "done everything it could to resolve" conflicts within the opposition and that those "who are trying to create a rift among the opposition, whether consciously or unconsciously, are helping Putin stay in power."

At a Solidarnost meeting on 12 March 2009, Nemtsov announced that he would run for mayor of Sochi in the city's 26 April election. As a Sochi native, he had criticized plans to hold the 2014 Winter Olympics in the town. He believed it was this criticism which led Nashi members to attack him with ammonium chloride on 23 March 2009.

In a March 2010 interview, Nemtsov criticized the decision to hold a Winter Olympics in Sochi, saying that Putin had "found one of the only places in Russia where there is no snow in the winter. ... Sochi is subtropical. There is no tradition of skating or hockey there. In Sochi, we prefer football, and volleyball, and swimming. Other parts of Russia need ice palaces – we don't." The construction at the Olympics site was "disastrous" for the local economy, he added, saying that about 5,000 citizens had been removed from their homes to build Olympic facilities. He also added that "thanks to the corruption and incompetence of authorities, [these people have] not yet been adequately compensated for their property or been given equivalent housing elsewhere, as they were promised. Billions of dollars have simply disappeared."

On 27 April 2009, it was announced that the acting Sochi mayor and United Russia candidate Anatoly Pakhomov had won the election with 77% of the vote. Nemtsov, who came second with around 14% of the vote, contested the fairness of the election, alleging that he was denied media access and that government workers had been pressured to vote for Pakhomov.

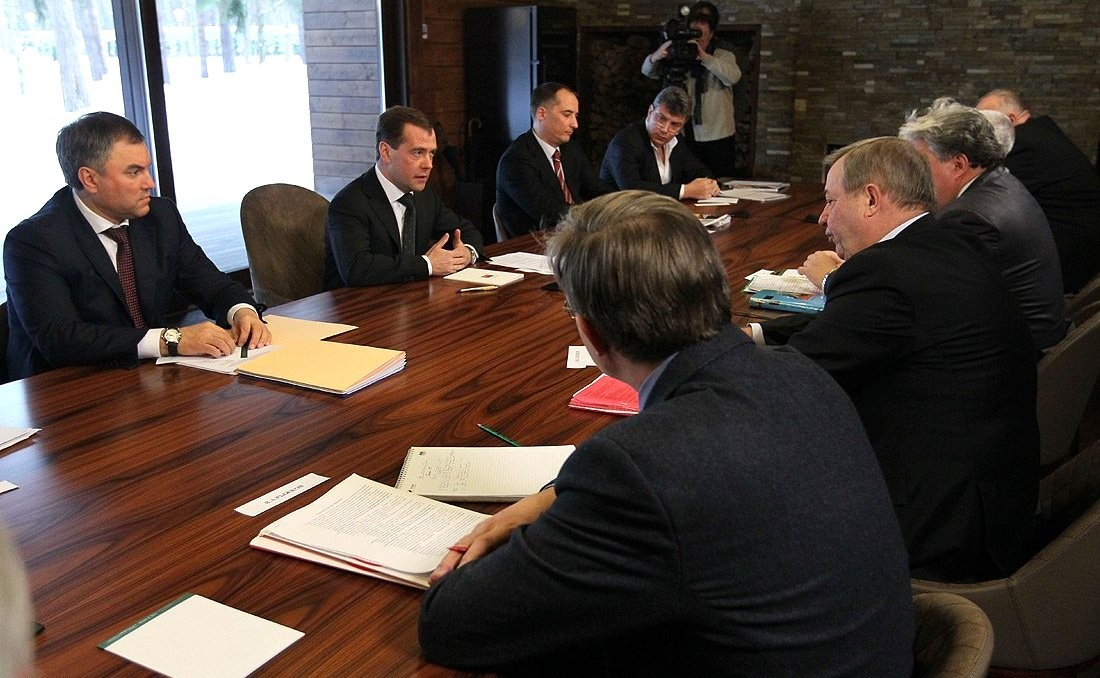
Russian President Dmitry Medvedev with Nemtsov and Vladimir Ryzhkov, February 2012

Nemtsov was among the 34 original signatories of the online anti-Putin manifesto "Putin Must Go", published on 10 March 2010. Six months later, in September 2010, together with Vladimir Ryzhkov, Mikhail Kasyanov and Vladimir Milov, Nemtsov formed the "For Russia without Lawlessness and Corruption" party, which, three months later was transformed into the People's Freedom Party. In May 2011, the party applied for registration with the Ministry of Justice, but the request was denied a month later.

In response to the question "Nemtsov, Milov and Ryzhkov and others, what do they really want?" in a live television broadcast on 16 December 2010, Putin stated that during the 1990s "they dragged a lot of billions along with Berezovsky and those who are now in prison... They have been pulled away from the manger, they had been spending heavily, and now they want to go back and fill their pockets". In January 2011, Nemtsov, Milov and Ryzhkov brought suit over Putin's statement before the Moscow City Court, but the following month the suit was dismissed. According to the judge, Tatiana Adamova, the names of Nemtsov, Milov and Ryzhkov were used merely as common names to refer to a certain class of politicians.

Nemtsov had befriended Michael McFaul, probably at some point before the latter was named US Ambassador to Russia in December 2011. Ambassador McFaul reminisces that Nemtsov told him that the best way for Putin to be stopped was to help Ukraine adopt Western values, because then Putin's claim that all Slavic people were similar and doomed to succumb to autocratic rule, would be falsified and Putin would inevitably fall.

In a May 2013 report, Nemtsov stated that up to $30 billion had been stolen from funds allocated for the Sochi Olympics. He accused the Putin administration of cronyism and embezzlement of funds on a level so grand it posed a threat to Russian national security. He suggested "establishing a civic committee in charge of the investigation of the crimes committed around the Olympic project."

Nemtsov about Winter Olympics in the subtropics, 2014

== Arrests in 2007, 2010, and 2011 ==
Nemtsov was arrested on 25 November 2007 during an unauthorized protest against President Putin near the State Hermitage Museum. Nemtsov and other opposition figures had complained of official harassment, and the police force had been used a number of times to break up what was then known as Dissenters' Marches. Nemtsov was released later that day.

On 31 December 2010, he was arrested with other opposition leaders during a rally against government restrictions on public protests. He was sentenced on 2 January 2011 to 15 days in jail. The arrests were condemned by US Senators John McCain and Joe Lieberman, and by Amnesty International, which described him as a prisoner of conscience. The Economist called his arrest "a new low" in the governance of Russia. "The mistreatment of him seems pointlessly malevolent. ... He poses no threat to the government. The rally was authorized and he was on his way home when the police stopped him. He was charged with disobeying the police and swearing, despite video footage that showed him asking the police to 'calm down'. A judge would not admit this as evidence. The court disregarded witness statements supporting him and would not let him appeal against his conviction."

In a February 2011 interview, Nemtsov recalled that the cell in which he was imprisoned "was a stone dungeon, about one and a half by three metres, veiled in semi-darkness so it was impossible to read. There was no bed, no pillows or mattresses, just the floor." He stated that his glasses, belt, and shoelaces were confiscated and he was given substandard living quarters. He attributed the decision to detain him to Vladislav Surkov, Deputy Chief of the Russian President's Administration and called it "a political decision." Nemtsov filed a complaint with the European Court of Human Rights, which accepted it and agreed to handle the case through its new urgent procedure.

During the 6 December 2011 protests in Moscow, Nemtsov was arrested with at least one hundred other demonstrators.

== Political views ==
After his dismissal from the government, Nemtsov became an important actor in the political discourse and eventually in the opposition to Putin's government. Nemtsov's political beliefs have caused some to characterize him as a "new liberal".

In February 2011, Nemtsov said: "Everyone is unhappy with Putin, save perhaps his closest friends." He noted that "for three consecutive years capital has been flowing out of the country, with some 40 billion dollars being taken out of the country in 2010 alone." As a result, "even within his party of corrupt thieves there are not so many people willing to follow him until the very end."

Nemtsov said:

Putin had used the Moscow theatre siege to impose a regime of total censorship on TV; he went on to destroy NTV, and then TV-6. He used the nightmare of Beslan to remove democratic elections of regional governors. In short, he 'drowned' everyone apart from the terrorists.

Nemtsov also stated:

There is a myth spreading about how, in the 1990s, we democrats were pals with oligarchs while Putin was fighting them. It was exactly the other way around. We did not let Berezovsky get a foothold in (the world's largest natural gas company) Gazprom, we did not allow him to take over the Svyazinvest company (Russia's largest telecom holding). Yet Putin used to go to his birthday parties and bring flowers to his wife. It was Berezovsky who lobbied for Putin to become president and then financed his campaign.

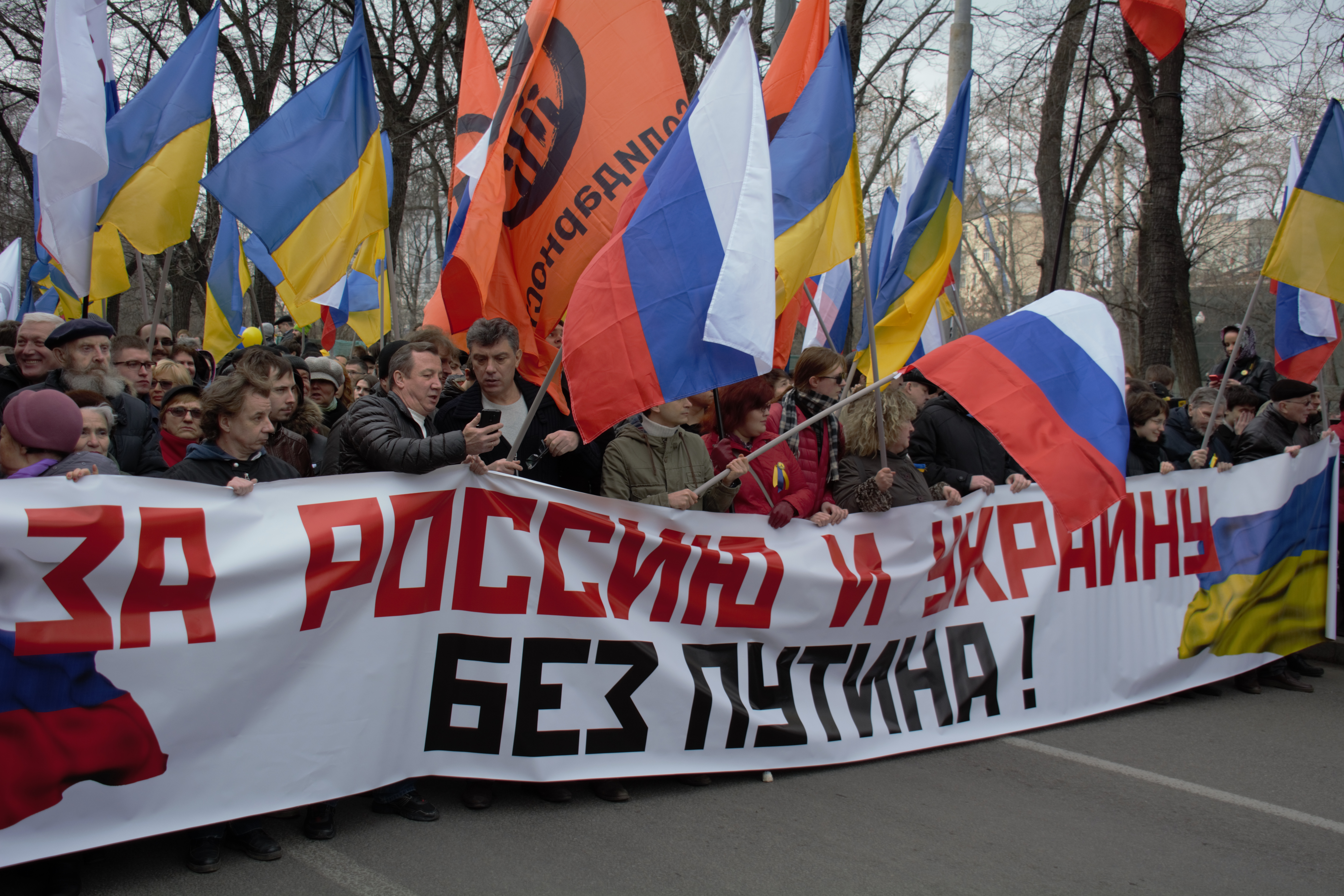
March of Peace, slogan "For Russia and Ukraine without Putin!", Moscow, 15 March 2014

Nemtsov told Newsweek in September 2011 that Putin's decision to run for president again "was predictable, but we were shocked by the hypocrisy and cynicism of the announcement: he declared he was coming back long before the elections. Putin and Medvedev did not even bother to share their decision to swap their chairs with the United Russia party before the congress. Russians had no choice but face his final decision; his usurpation of political power is sickly humiliating." Nemtsov said that all of his "friends in big business" planned "to take their capital out of Russia", while some "prefer to emigrate."

In a March 2012 op-ed for The Wall Street Journal, Nemtsov and Garry Kasparov expressed support for "the repeal of the Jackson–Vanik amendment that impedes American trade relations with Russia". Nemtsov and Kasparov stated that at "opposition meetings following the fraudulent March 4 election", they and their associates "publicly resolved that Mr. Putin is not the legitimate leader of Russia." They explained that they wanted "the U.S. and other leading nations of the Free World [to] cease to provide democratic credentials to Mr. Putin", and asked that the U.S. replace Jackson–Vanik with the Sergei Magnitsky Rule of Law Accountability Act and thus improve relations between the United States and the people of Russia all while refusing aid to the Putin regime.

In December 2013, Nemtsov said on behalf of his party:

We support Ukraine's course toward European integration [...] By supporting Ukraine, we also support ourselves.

Nemtsov condemned the shooting down of Malaysia Airlines Flight 17 in eastern Ukraine:

My condolences to the families of the victims. The bastards, who did this, must be destroyed. The separatists the other day bragged they had the Buk missiles, with which they wanted to take down an An-26. If those are them, they must get no mercy.

Nemtsov was among the few Russian statesmen to vocally oppose the annexation of Crimea by Russia. Nemtsov stated that he viewed Crimea as an integral part of Ukraine, that he considered its annexation by the Russian Federation to be illegal, and that the people of Crimea and not Russian legislators should decide which country they want to live in. In an op-ed published on 1 September 2014 in the Kyiv Post, Nemtsov lamented the "fratricidal war" between Russia and Ukraine.

This is not our war, this is not your war, this is not the war of 20-year-old paratroopers sent out there. This is Vladimir Putin's war.

He accused Putin of "trying to dissect Ukraine and create in the east of the country a puppet state, Novorossiya, that is fully economically and politically controlled by the Kremlin." Meanwhile, wrote Nemtsov, "Russia itself is sinking into lies, violence, obscurantism and imperial hysteria." He stated that he sometimes thinks Putin is insane, but at other times he recognizes that Putin is driven by one goal: the "preservation of personal power and money at any cost." Ukraine had overthrown "a thieving president," and Putin needed to punish it "to make sure that no Russian would get these thoughts."

Ukraine chose the European way, which implies the rule of law, democracy and change of power. Ukraine's success on this way is a direct threat to Putin's power because he chose the opposite course – a lifetime in power, filled with arbitrariness and corruption.

He criticized Putin in 2014:

I cannot understand what Putin expects when he arms 20,000 Kadyrovites. Putin diligently finances Chechnya by sending there trains loaded with money. The republic receives a minimum of 60 billion rubles a year in grants. Only Allah knows how much money is being siphoned off through different programs, such as Northern Caucasus Resorts.

In April 2014, in an interview with journalists Boris Nemtsov called Putin a mental patient. This statement was used as the basis for initiation of criminal proceeding against Nemtsov but, eventually, the case was requalified to administrative offence.

In his report “Putin. War” on August 26, 2014, Nemtsov appealed to the Russian armed forces to stop the invasion of eastern Ukraine

At any moment you may be sent (and some have already been sent) to fight in Ukraine. Putin, as Commander-in-Chief, well knows that the use of Russian Armed Forces in eastern Ukraine is illegal. He has no mandate for war, no authorization from the Federation Council to deploy troops abroad. That’s why you fight without insignia, with your military vehicles’ identification marks painted over. That’s why he lies, claiming you got “lost” in the Luhansk and Donetsk regions. That’s why your comrades from the 76th Airborne Division, Leonid Kichatkin and Alexander Osipov, are secretly buried in the Pskov cemetery, and their relatives are threatened with losing benefits if they speak the truth. Because this war is illegal, you and your families have no rights. Putin and your commanders will disown you at any moment, claiming they never sent you to war, and your relatives will never uncover the truth if something happens to you. You swore an oath to defend the Motherland from enemies, but not to fight against the fraternal, Orthodox Ukrainian people. The war in Ukraine is a crime with no statute of limitations. This war serves Russia’s enemies. This is not your war. This is not our war. This is Putin’s war for his power and money. This is the war of his billionaire friends—Rottenberg, Timchenko, Yanunin—and their enrichment. Remember, you are fighting and dying for them, not for Russia.

== Death ==
=== Nemtsov's fears ===
Less than three weeks before his murder, on 10 February Nemtsov wrote on Russia's Sobesednik news website that his 87-year-old mother was afraid Putin would kill him. He added that his mother was also afraid for oligarch Mikhail Khodorkovsky and anti-corruption activist Alexei Navalny. When asked if he himself was afraid for his life, Nemtsov answered: "Yes, not as strongly as my mother, but still..." In an extended version of the interview, Nemtsov reportedly added: "I am just joking. If I were afraid of Putin, I wouldn't be in this line of work."

Two weeks prior to his assassination, Nemtsov had met "with an old friend", Yevgenia Albats, editor of The New Times magazine, to discuss his research into Putin's role in the war in Ukraine. Albats said that Nemtsov "was afraid of being killed", adding:

And he was trying to convince himself, and me, they wouldn't touch him because he was a [former] member of the Russian government, a vice premier, and they wouldn't want to create a precedent. Because as he said, one time the power will change hands in Russia again, and those who served Putin wouldn't want to create this precedent.

=== Assassination ===
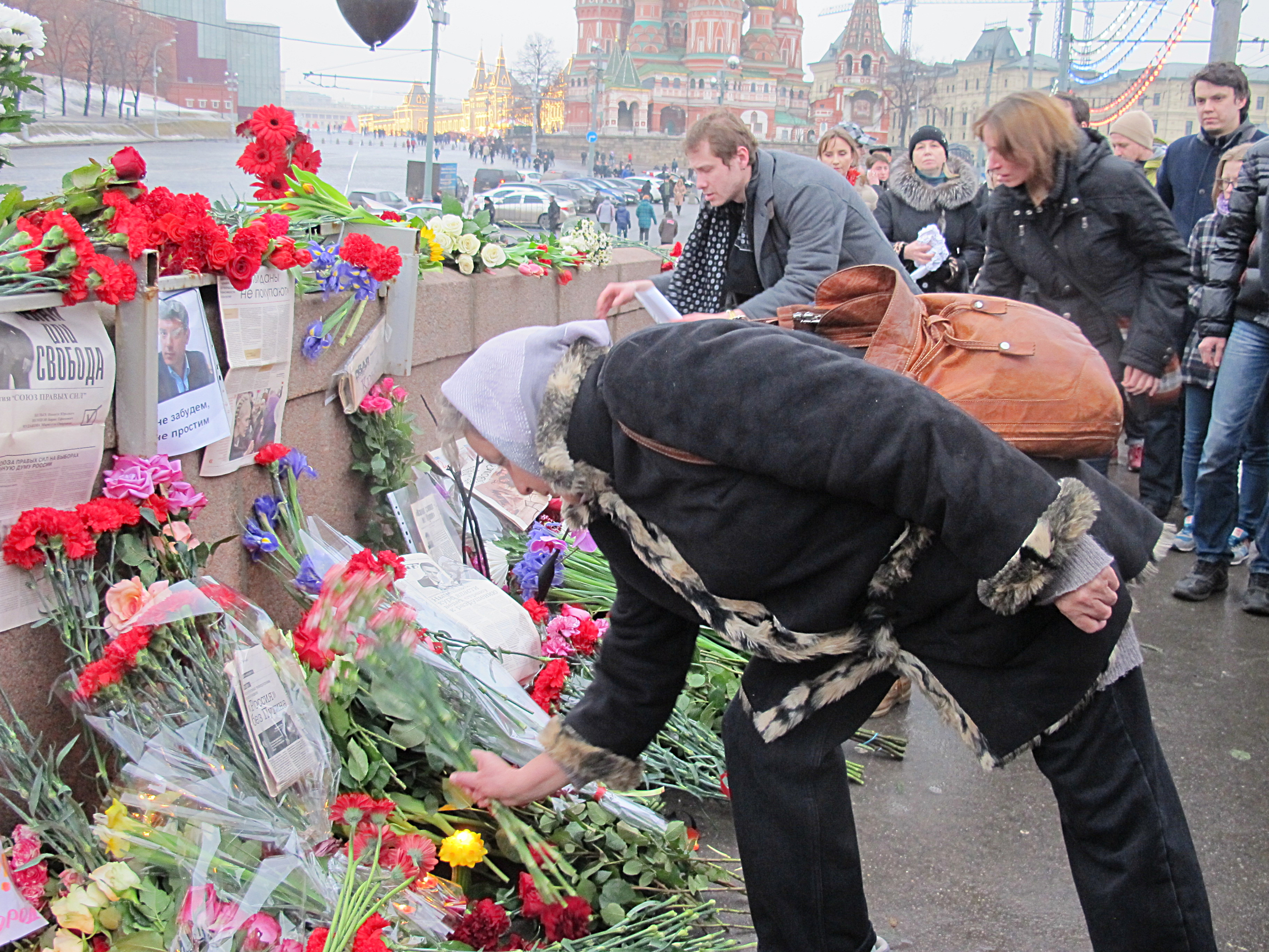
Location of the murder at the Bolshoy Moskvoretsky Bridge

Just before midnight, at 11:31 PM local time on 27 February 2015, Nemtsov was shot several times from behind. He was crossing the Bolshoy Moskvoretsky Bridge in Moscow, close to the Kremlin walls and Red Square. (Note: 55.7495°N 37.62421°E) He died at the scene. He was murdered less than two days before he was due to take part in a peace rally against Russian involvement in the war in Ukraine and the financial crisis in Russia.

BBC News reported: "In his last tweet, Mr. Nemtsov sent out an appeal for Russia's divided opposition to unite at an anti-war march he was planning for Sunday." BBC News also quoted him as saying: "If you support stopping Russia's war with Ukraine, if you support stopping Putin's aggression, come to the Spring March in Maryino on 1 March."

The night after Nemtsov's murder, his papers, writings and computer hard drives were confiscated in a police search of his apartment on Malaya Ordynka street.

=== Aftermath, context and accusations ===
Russian journalist Ksenia Sobchak said that Nemtsov had been preparing a report proving the presence of Russian military in eastern Ukraine despite official denials.

Two weeks before his murder, Nemtsov had "met with an old friend to discuss his latest research into what he said was dissembling and misdeeds in the Kremlin." Yevgenia Albats, editor of The New Times magazine, said that Nemtsov worked on a report which he planned to call "Putin and the War", because it focused on Putin's role in the war in Ukraine. Albats commented on her fear for Nemtsov's life.

Some people had accused Russian security services of responsibility for the crime. Vladimir Milov, a former deputy minister of energy and fellow opposition figure, said: "There is ever less doubt that the state is behind the murder of Boris Nemtsov" and stated that the objective had been "to sow fear." Opposition activist Maxim Katz held Putin responsible: "If he ordered it, then he's guilty as the orderer. And even if he didn't, then [he is responsible] as the inciter of hatred, hysteria, and anger among the people." Dmitry Peskov, a spokesman for Russian President Vladimir Putin, told reporters: "Putin noted that this cruel murder has all the hallmarks of a contract hit and is extremely provocative".

Russian opposition leader and Nemtsov's ally Ilya Yashin claimed that Chechnya's leader Ramzan Kadyrov was behind the assassination of Nemtsov, saying that "Chechnya today is a quasi-Islamic state within the Russian Federation that does not obey Russian rules, and whose only connection with the federal authorities is the systematic receipt of money from the federal budget. Russian society stays silent because people are afraid of Kadyrov. And he exploits this fear as an instrument to muffle critics." Zhanna Nemtsova repeatedly said she wanted Kadyrov to be questioned about what he knew about the assassination of her father.

Shortly after Nemtsov's murder, journalist Julia Ioffe stated several theories about the crime had begun to circulate. "Yet we can be sure that the investigation will lead precisely nowhere", she wrote. "At most, some sad sap, the supposed trigger-puller, will be hauled in front of a judge, the scapegoat for someone far more powerful. More likely, the case will flounder for years amid promises that everyone is working hard, and no one will be brought to justice at all." Ioffe said that the Kremlin was already "muddying the waters".

In March, employees at the Internet Research Agency were assigned to leave comments on Russian news outlets blaming the opposition for murdering Nemtsov. IRA employees could use either of two scenarios in their comments: either Ukrainian oligarchs had killed Nemtsov to embarrass Moscow or Nemtsov's own supporters had killed him as a "provocation."

LifeNews, a publication tied to Russia's security agencies, had suggested "three possible theories", namely that the killing was "revenge for forcing Duritskaya to get an abortion", or that it "had something to do with money Nemtsov was receiving from allies abroad", or that it was "an attempt to smear the Kremlin." A statement by the government's Investigative Committee theorized that Nemtsov was "killed by someone from his own opposition movement who wanted to create a martyr" and even suggested "that the assassination was connected to the Charlie Hebdo killings.

According to Bellingcat analysis Nemtsov was followed prior to the assassination by the same FSB team that would subsequently follow Vladimir Kara-Murza, Dmitry Bykov and Alexei Navalny before their suspected poisonings.

=== Reactions and sanctions ===
Political consultant Gleb Pavlovsky opined that Russia had been affected by "a Weimar atmosphere" in which there were "no longer any limits." Opposition activist Leonid Volkov maintained that Russians now lived "in a different political reality."

United States President Barack Obama called on Russia's government to launch "a prompt, impartial, and transparent" investigation to ensure that "those responsible for this vicious killing are brought to justice". German Chancellor Angela Merkel condemned the "cowardly murder". A statement by her office demanded that Putin "assure himself that this assassination is elucidated and that its perpetrators are held accountable".

On 6 December 2017, the Council of the District of Columbia held a hearing to decide on symbolically renaming a section of Wisconsin Avenue as Boris Nemtsov Plaza. The Embassy of the Russian Federation fronts the section of street proposed for the designation. On 9 January 2018, the Council unanimously approved the "Boris Nemtsov Plaza Designation Act of 2017" which authorized the renaming. The section of the street was renamed.

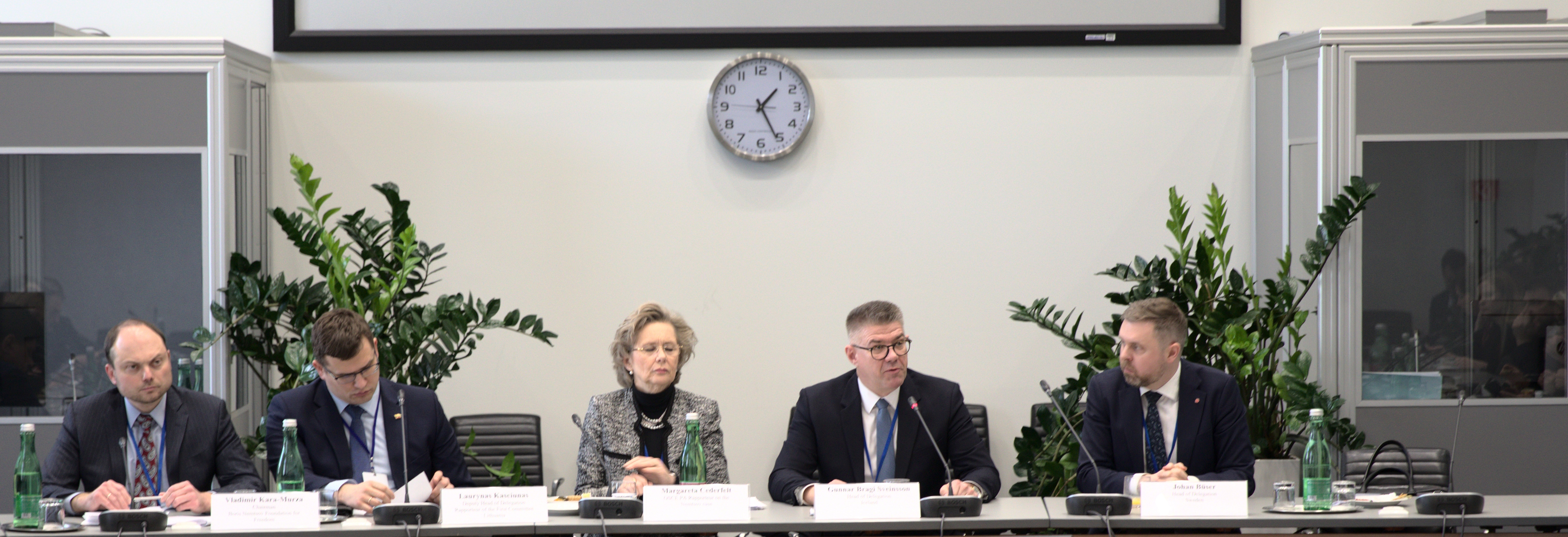
Presentation of the Nemtsov Report 2020 by the Parliamentary Assembly of the Organization for Security and Co-operation in Europe in the Hofburg

On 12 March 2019, the United States House of Representatives passed bills intended to hold Russian President Vladimir Putin accountable for his country's actions, including a measure condemning the Russian leader and his government for their alleged roles in covering up the 2015 assassination of Putin political opponent Boris Nemtsov.

After Nemtsov's murder, Serge Schmemann of The New York Times paid tribute to him in an article headlined "A Reformer Who Never Backed Down." Schmemann wrote: "Tall, handsome, witty and irreverent, Mr. Nemtsov was one of the brilliant young men who burst onto the Russian stage at that exciting moment when Communist rule collapsed and a new era seemed imminent." Julia Ioffe of The New York Times described Nemtsov after his death as "a powerful, vigorous critic of Vladimir Putin", who was "a deeply intelligent, witty, kind and ubiquitous man" who "seemed to genuinely be everyone's friend".

On 11 July 2023, the European Court of Human Rights judged that the assassination investigation by the Russian authorities had been "inadequate and ineffective" and there had been a violation of the right to life.

=== Convictions ===
Several suspects have been implicated in the assassination, all of whom are Chechens. The alleged shooter is a former officer in the security force of Chechen leader Ramzan Kadyrov, who was also accused by opposition leader Ilya Yashin of having murdered Nemtsov.

Five Chechen men were prosecuted for his murder. In late June 2017, these men were found guilty by a jury in a court in Moscow for agreeing to kill Nemtsov in exchange for 15 million rubles (US$253,000); neither the identity nor whereabouts of the person who hired them has been publicly revealed.

== Memorial rallies ==
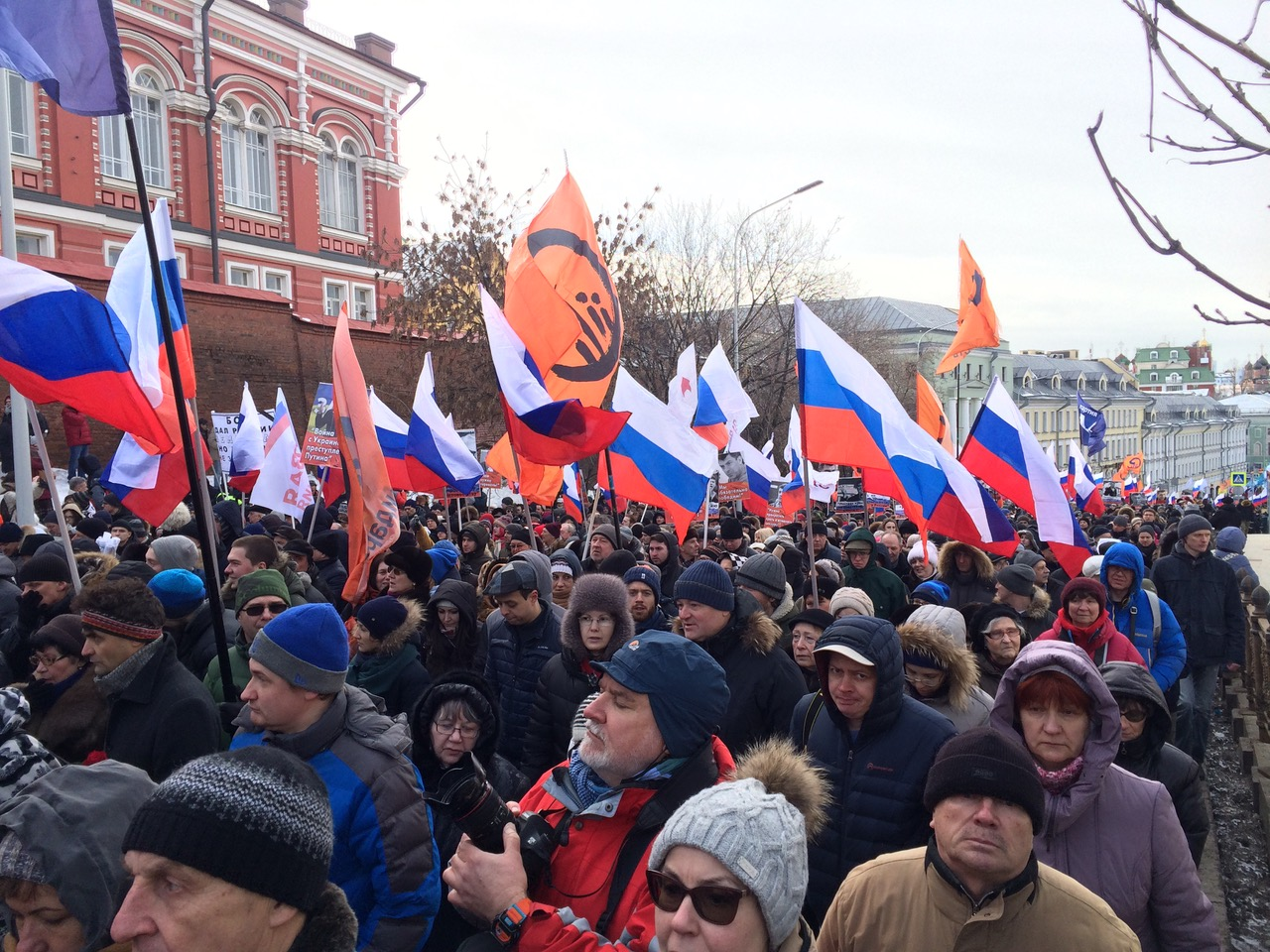
March in memory of Nemtsov in Moscow, 26 February 2017

At a memorial rally held in Moscow on 1 March, the date on which Nemtsov had planned to lead an opposition march, mourners carried signs that read: "He was fighting for a free Russia," "Those shots were in each of us," "He died for the future of Russia," and "They were afraid of you, Boris." Several thousand people also marched in Saint Petersburg. Serge Schmemann of The New York Times wrote that the Moscow rally seemed like "a memorial march for the hopes and dreams that lay alongside Mr. Nemtsov's murdered body in the middle of the night on the bridge to Red Square."

In August 2015, Nemtsov's daughter Zhanna Nemtsova was the recipient of Poland's Solidarity Prize for her father's work. On 9 October 2015, opposition activists in Moscow erected a monument dedicated to Nemtsov at his tomb at Troyekurovskoye Cemetery, plot 16. The monument, unveiled on what would have been his 56th birthday, shows Nemtsov's name with five bullet holes puncturing it.

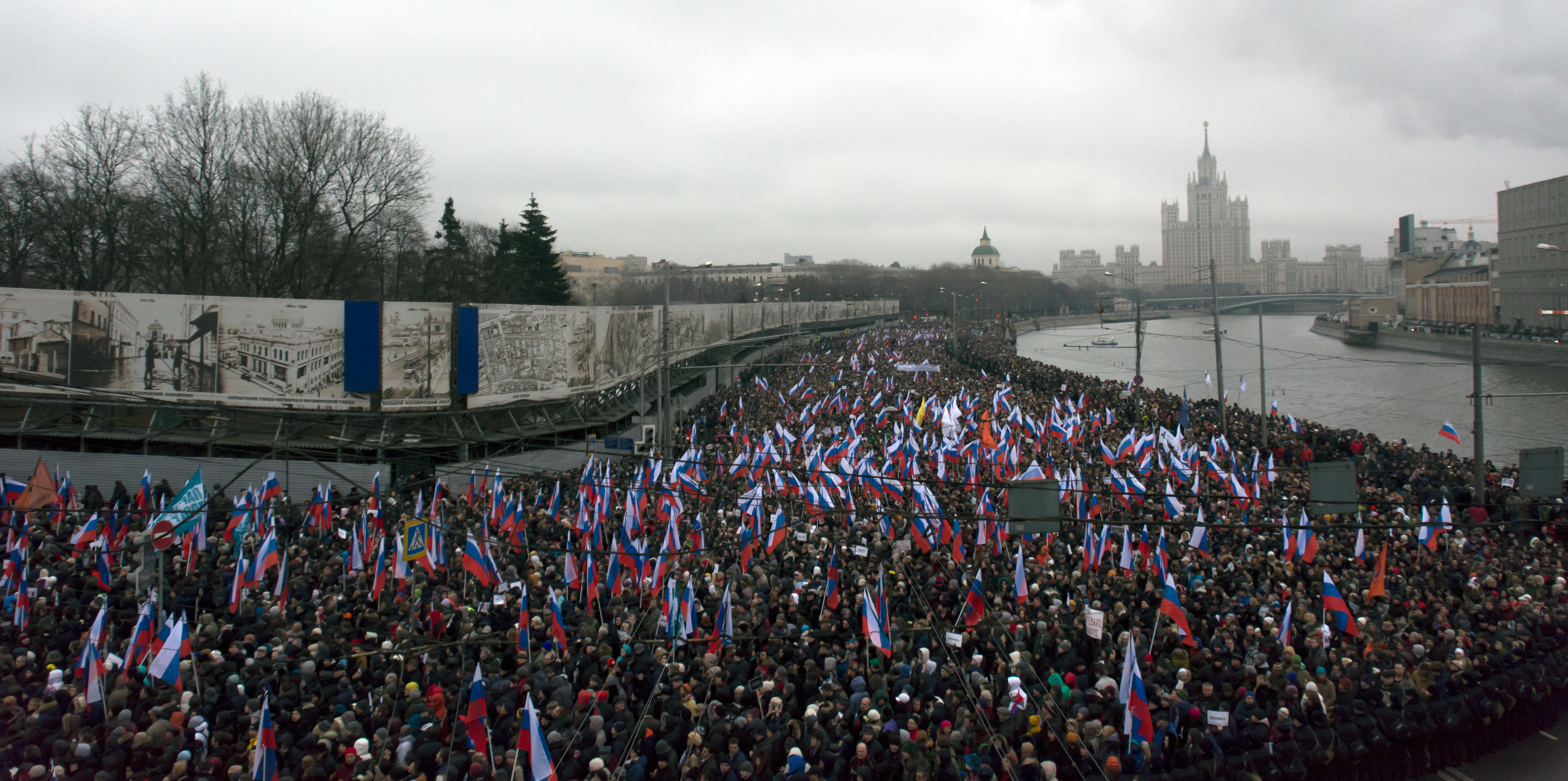
Tens of thousands march in Moscow in memory of Nemtsov, 1 March 2015

In late February 2017, a peaceful protest and commemorative plaque dedication are planned in Nizhny Novgorod, in commemoration of his ideology and the freedom of speech that led to his assassination.

== Honors and awards ==
- Medal of the Order "For Merit to the Fatherland", Second class, (10 March 1995) – for service to the state associated with the completion of the first phase of the voucher privatization scheme.
- Medal "For Strengthening of Brotherhood in Arms" (Ministry of Defense) (2001).
- Order of Holy Prince Daniel of Moscow (ROC) (1996) – for his contribution to nation-building.
- Honorary sign of the Legislative Assembly of Nizhny Novgorod Region "Merit" (26 March 2009).
- Order of Prince Yaroslav the Wise, Fifth class, (Ukraine) (19 August 2006) – for a significant contribution to the development of international cooperation, strengthening the authority and positive image of Ukraine in the world, popularization of its historical and modern achievements.
- Order of Liberty (Ukraine, posthumously).
- Jan Karski Eagle Prize (Poland, 15 May 2015, posthumously).
- IRI Freedom Award (United States, September 2015, posthumously).
- Boris Nemtsov Square (Czech Republic, 27 February 2020, posthumously)
- Boris Nemtsov Place (United Kingdom, 14 November 2022, posthumously) – Camden Council named a roundabout in Highgate "Boris Nemtsov Place", very close to the Russian Trade Delegation.

== Political publications ==
Memoirs:

- "Provincial" – 1997
- "Provincial in Moscow" – 1999
- Confessions of a rebel – 2007

Beginning in 2008, Nemtsov and Vladimir Milov published several white papers criticising Putin's government and proposing alternative ways of development for the country:

- Putin. Results – February 2008
- Putin and Gazprom – September 2008
- Putin and the Crisis – February 2009
- Sochi and the Olympics – April 2009
- Putin. Results. 10 years – June 2010, Putin: What 10 Years of Putin Have Brought, revised edition of the report Putin. Results of 2008.
- Putin. Corruption – March 2011. Written by co-chairmen of the People's Freedom Party Nemtsov, Milov, Ryzhkov and Solidarity movement spokesman Olga Shorina. The printing of the report was funded with donations. Entitled "Putin the Thief", this report stated that Putin's decade in power had seen "an extraordinary increase in the abuse of power and corruption." The report described Putin's corruption in detail and said that it far exceeded "the scale of corruption under Yeltsin." The report stated that corruption in Russia "has ceased being a problem in Russia; it has become a system" that "represents 25% of the country's GNP."
- In a May 2013 report, Nemtsov stated that up to $30 billion had been stolen from funds allocated for the Sochi Olympics. He accused the Putin administration of cronyism and embezzlement of funds on a level so grand it posed as a threat to Russian national security. He suggested "establishing a civic committee in charge of the investigation of the crimes committed around the Olympic project."
- At the time of his murder, Nemtsov was preparing for publication his next report proving the presence of Russian military in eastern Ukraine (BBC News International, 28 February 2015; a Russian source is quoting journalist Ksenia Sobchak on the matter). In May 2015, the report has been published under the title "Putin. War". The publication reported that more than 200 Russian soldiers were then operating in Ukraine.
- Nemtsov, Boris. 2000. "Reform for Russia: Forging a New Domestic Policy", Harvard International Review 22 (No. 2): 16–21.

== Documentary films ==
- 2015 – My Friend Boris Nemtsov (Russian: Мой друг Борис Немцов, Moj drug Boris Nemtsov), documentary film by Zosia Rodkevich on the man and political activist Nemtsov.
- 2016 – Nemtsov (Russian: Немцов, Nemtsov), documentary film by Vladimir V. Kara-Murza.
- 2016 – The Man Who Was Too Free (Russian: Слишком свободный человек, Slishkom svobodnyy chelovek), documentary film by Mikhail Fishman and Vera Krichevskaya.

== See also ==
- Boris Nemtsov Square, Prague
