= Union of Right Forces =

Union of Right Forces Союз правых сил
- Abbreviation: SPS; СПС
- President (s): Sergey Kiriyenko (1998–2001); Boris Nemtsov (2001–2004); Viktor Nekrutenko (2004–2005); Nikita Belykh (2005–2008); Leonid Gozman (acting, 2008)
- Founders: Yegor Gaidar; Anatoly Chubais; Sergey Kiriyenko; Boris Nemtsov; Irina Khakamada; Konstantin Titov
- Founded: 24 October 1999 (as bloc); 26 May 2001 (as party)
- Dissolved: 15 November 2008
- Merger of: Democratic Choice of Russia; Conservative Movement "New Force"; Young Russia (liberal movement); Democratic Russia; Voice of Russia; Common Cause; Party of Economic Freedom
- Preceded by: Right Cause (coalition)
- Succeeded by: Right Cause; Solidarnost; Democratic Choice
- Headquarters: Moscow
- Newspaper: Just Cause
- Membership (2007): 57,410
- Ideology: Liberal conservatism Conservative liberalism Neoliberalism; Economic liberalism Pro-Europeanism; Atlanticism
- Political position: Centre-right
- International affiliation: International Democrat Union
- Colours: Blue, red, white
- Slogan: Наше дело правое! ('Our Cause is Just/Right'); Свобода, Собственность, Законность ('Liberty, Property, Legality')
- Anthem: "Patrioticheskaya Pesnya"
- Seats in the 3rd State Duma: 29 / 450
- Seats in the 4th State Duma: 3 / 450

Party flag
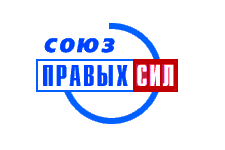

Website
- www.sps.ru

The Union of Right Forces (Russian: Союз правых сил, romanized: Soyuz pravykh sil, pronounced [sɐˈjus ˈpravɨx ˈsʲil]; abbr. СПС, romanized: SPS, pronounced [ˌɛsˌpɛˈɛs]) was a Russian liberal-conservative political public organization and former party, initially founded as an electoral bloc in 1999 and associated with free market reforms, privatization, and the legacy of the "young reformers" of the 1990s: Anatoly Chubais, Boris Nemtsov, Sergey Kiriyenko and Yegor Gaidar. The party officially self-dissolved in 2008. Nikita Belykh was the party's last leader from 2005 to 2008.

In 2011, the SPS was refounded by some of its former members as the Union of Right Forces Movement. In 2012, it was registered as a political public organization, a type of NGO. In Russia, participation in elections requires being accepted into the list of political parties controlled by the Ministry of Justice.

Both the former SPS and the refounded SPS were accepted as a member of the International Democrat Union (IDU).

== Political party (1999–2008) ==
The SPS was established in 1999, following a merger of several smaller liberal parties, including Democratic Choice of Russia and Democratic Russia. In the 1999 parliamentary elections the SPS won 8.6% of the vote and 32 seats in the Russian State Duma (lower house of the Federal Assembly of Russia).

In the 2000 presidential election, the SPS supported Vladimir Putin's candidacy, though many of the party leaders supported Grigory Yavlinsky. The SPS parliamentarians overwhelmingly voted against reintroducing the Soviet-era national anthem in 2000.

The SPS was led by former Deputy Prime Minister Boris Nemtsov from 2000 to 2003. During this time SPS strongly opposed what it saw to be the authoritarian policies of President Vladimir Putin, and argued that political and media freedoms in Russia had been curtailed.

In the 2003 parliamentary elections, the SPS, according to official results, received 4% of the vote and failed to cross the 5% threshold necessary for parliamentary representation. In single-mandate constituencies, SPS candidates Pavel Krasheninnikov, Arsen Fadzaev, and Alexey Likhachyov were elected to the State Duma of the fourth convocation (all three moved to the United Russia faction). State Duma deputy Anton Bakov joined the SPS. A number of SPS candidates came second in single-mandate electoral districts the party had previously held, such as Irina Khakamada in St. Petersburg, Vladimir V. Kara-Murza in Moscow, or Boris Nadezhdin in the Moscow Oblast. Despite allegations of fraud, Boris Nemtsov accepted responsibility for the election defeat and resigned as SPS leader in January 2004. On 28 May 2005 Nikita Belykh was elected as the new leader of the party.

Plans to merge with Yabloko were shelved in late 2006.

The party won 0.96% of votes in the 2007 elections, not breaking the 7% barrier, and thus received no seats in the Duma.

In 2008, Nikita Belyh left his chair to Leonid Gozman. On 1 October 2008, the federal political council of the party voted to dissolve the party and merge it with Civilian Power and Democratic Party of Russia, forming a new liberal-democratic party called Right Cause, which succeeded the SPS as a member of the International Democracy Union.

== Political public organization (2011–present) ==
In 2011, a group of former members accused the Right Cause of being too close to the Russian government under Vladimir Putin and refounded the SPS, registering it as a political public organization. As a consequence, the International Democracy Union suspended the membership of the Right Cause and returned it to the new SPS.

On 27 February 2014, the SPS formally condemned the 2014 Russian invasion of Ukraine.

== Electoral results ==
=== Presidential ===
Election	Candidate	First round		Second round		Result
Election	Candidate	Votes	%	Votes	%	Result
2000	Endorsed Vladimir Putin	39,740,434	52.94	—N/a		Won
2004	Irina Khakamada	2,671,313	3.84	—N/a		Lost
2008	Boris Nemtsov	Withdrew from the elections, supported Kasyanov				

=== State Duma ===
Election	Party leader	Performance					Rank	Government
Election	Party leader	Votes	%	± pp	Seats	+/–	Rank	Government
1999	Sergey Kiriyenko	5,677,247	8.52%	New	29 / 450	New	▲4th	Coalition
2003	Boris Nemtsov	6,944,322	3.97%	▼4.45	3 / 450	▼26	▼6th	Opposition
2007	Nikita Belykh	2,408,535	0.96%	▼3.01	0 / 450	▼3	▼8th	Extra-parliamentary

== See also ==
- Liberalism
- Liberal parties by country
- Liberal democracy
- Liberalism in Russia
- Union of Left Forces
