= Confessions of a Rebel =

2007 book by Boris Nemtsov

Confessions of a rebel
- Author: Boris Nemtsov
- Language: Russian
- Genre: Autobiography
- Publisher: Partisan
- Publication date: 2007
- Publication place: Russia
- Pages: 216

Confessions of a Rebel: Politics Without Whoring (Russian: Исповедь бунтаря. Политика без бл**ства) is a book by Russian politician Boris Nemtsov, published in 2007 by Moscow publishing house Partisan, in which he describes some of the political events of the 1990s, the beginning of his political career, presents his views on the problems of Russian society. Nemtsov, in particular, regrets that the SPS support Vladimir Putin's candidacy in the presidential elections in 2000. This is the third in his series of autobiographical books: Provincial (1997), Provincial in Moscow (1999), and Confession of a Rebel (2007).

According to the rating Kommersant-Dengi, in October 2007,Confessions of a Rebel, published edition of 25,100 copies. Took first place in the list of best-selling nonfiction books. The book is also in the lead in the October ranking Zeitgeist Google's search volume on title of the book. In the words of Nemtsov, in November 2007 sales in Moscow placed the book ahead of Harry Potter. Nemtsov noted that the yield of the book should not be seen as a pre-election rally.

A positive review was published in Literaturnaya Gazeta
