= International Republican Institute =

US-funded international organization

- Abbreviation: IRI
- Formation: 1983 (43 years ago)
- Type: 501(c)(3) organization
- Tax ID no.: 52-1340267
- Headquarters: 1225 I Street NW, Suite 800, Washington, D.C., U.S.
- Key people: Daniel Twining (President); Dan Sullivan (Chairman of the Board of Directors)
- Budget: $78m (2008)
- Revenue: $55,185,831 (2016)
- Expenses: $55,053,587 (2016)
- Staff: 400 (2008)
- Website: www.iri.org

The International Republican Institute (IRI) is an American nonprofit organization founded in 1983 and funded and supported by the United States federal government. Most of its board is drawn from the Republican Party. Its public mission is to advance freedom and democracy worldwide by helping political parties to become more issue-based and responsive, assisting citizens to participate in government planning, and working to increase the role of marginalized groups in the political process, including women and youth. It has been repeatedly accused of foreign interference and has been implicated in the 2004 Haitian coup d'état. It was initially known as the National Republican Institute for International Affairs.

IRI's programs include assisting political parties and candidates develop their values and institutional structures, good governance practices, civil society development, civic education, women's and youth leadership development, electoral reform and election monitoring, and political expression in closed societies. Since its founding, IRI has been active globally in Africa, Asia, the Caribbean, Eastern Europe, Latin America, and the Middle East.

In 2018, U.S. senator John McCain, who served as IRI's chairman of the board for 25 years, informed IRI's board of directors that he was stepping down. McCain recommended U.S. senator Dan Sullivan to succeed him.

== History ==
IRI was founded in 1983 following then U.S. president Ronald Reagan's 1982 speech before the British Parliament in Westminster in which he proposed a broad objective of helping countries build the infrastructure of democracy. Quoting the Universal Declaration of Human Rights, Reagan said, "we must be staunch in our conviction that freedom is not the sole prerogative of a lucky few but the inalienable and universal right of all human beings."

IRI operates globally, providing training and assistance to political parties. As a 501(c)(3) tax-exempt organization, IRI plays no part in domestic U.S. politics. However, the majority of its board are drawn from the Republican Party. Its sister organization, the National Democratic Institute, draws mainly from the Democratic Party.

=== IRI Freedom Award ===
In 1995, IRI established the Freedom Award "to honor individuals who have worked to advance freedom and democracy in their countries and around the world". Its first recipient was Alfredo Cristiani, who served as President of El Salvador from 1989 to 1994. Other recipients have included Miguel Obando y Bravo, the Archbishop of Managua from 1970 to 2005, Ronald Reagan, the 40th President of the United States, Aung San Suu Kyi, the State Counsellor and Minister of Foreign Affairs of Myanmar, Soviet dissident Natan Sharansky, Ellen Johnson Sirleaf, the President of Liberia from 2006 to 2018, and others.

=== 2004 Haitian coup ===
IRI received funding for its Haiti programs from USAID from 2002 until 2004. IRI ended its Haiti program in summer 2007.

On January 29, 2006, Canadian Broadcasting Corporation television premiered a documentary film about the IRI's role in the coup, Haiti: Democracy Undone.

Brian Dean Curran, U.S. Ambassador at the time and a former Clinton appointee, accused IRI of undermining his efforts to hold peaceful negotiations between Jean-Bertrand Aristide and his opposition after contested parliamentary elections in 2000. According to Curran, Stanley Lucas, then IRI's representative in Haiti, advised opposition leaders not to compromise with Aristide, who was later driven from power. Curran also alleges that Lucas represented himself to the opposition as the Washington, D.C. envoy and his advice, which was contrary to that of the U.S. State Department, was advice from the U.S. government. IRI responded to Ambassador Curran's allegations in a letter to the New York Times.

=== 2009 Honduran constitutional crisis ===
In 2009, IRI received $550,000 from the National Endowment for Democracy to "promote and enhance the participation of think tanks in Mexico and Honduras as pressure groups to impel political parties to develop concrete positions on key issues" and to "support initiatives to implement political positions during the campaigns in 2009" following the 2009 Honduran constitutional crisis.

=== Cuba ===
In 2008, the government of Cuba accused former U.S. congressional staff member Caleb McCarry of orchestrating the 2004 Haitian coup and attempting to provoke a coup d'état in Cuba.

=== Middle East ===
According to an April 15, 2011 article in The New York Times, IRI, the National Democratic Institute for International Affairs, and other groups were credited for training activists in the Middle East, including Egypt and Tunisia, who advocated for reform in authoritarian regimes.

In 2011, Egypt's Ministry of Justice issued a report on foreign funding of NGOs operating in Egypt that alleged that IRI had received approximately $7 million by USAID for the Egyptian 2011–12 elections. The military rulers who gained control of Egypt following the January 2011 revolution considered this foreign funding interference in Egypt's internal affairs.

=== Poland ===
IRI has operated programs in Poland since 1991, where it says it has worked to unite and organize a diverse range of "center and center right" political parties together to create the Solidarity Electoral Action (AWS), which governed Poland in coalition with the Freedom Union (UW) party between 1997 and 2001. It also said that it provided training in political campaigning, communications training and research which helped organise and create the AWS.

=== China ===
In August 2020, IRI president Daniel Twining and four other U.S.-based democracy and human rights organizations and six U.S. Republican lawmakers were sanctioned by the Chinese government for supporting the Hong Kong pro-democracy movement in the 2019–20 Hong Kong protests. Leaders of the five organizations who were sanctioned alleged that the unspecified sanctions were a tit-for-tat measure in response to the earlier sanctioning by the U.S. government of 11 Hong Kong officials, which was a reaction to the enactment of the Hong Kong national security law at the end of June 2020.

=== Second Trump term ===
IRI has been funded by the National Endowment for Democracy (NED). After Elon Musk's Department of Government Efficiency cut funding to the NED by blocking disbursement from the US Department of Treasury in February 2025, IRI was forced to lay off two-thirds of its work force in Washington, D.C. and closed more than 20 of its overseas offices.

== Operations and programs ==
=== Africa ===
IRI is heavily engaged in Africa, currently working in Benin, Burkina Faso, Cameroon, Central African Republic, Chad, Democratic Republic of the Congo, Ethiopia, Ghana, Kenya, Mozambique, Nigeria, Sierra Leone, Somalia, Somaliland, Sudan, Tanzania, The Gambia, Uganda, and Zimbabwe.

=== Asia-Pacific ===
In the Asia-Pacific region, IRI is active in Bangladesh, Burma, Cambodia, China, Fiji, Indonesia, Korea, Laos, Malaysia, Maldives, Mongolia, Nepal, Pakistan, Papua New Guinea, Philippines, Samoa, Solomon Islands, Sri Lanka, Taiwan, Thailand, Timor-Leste, and Vanuatu.

IRI announced its decision to open a field office in Taiwan in October 2020.

=== Eurasia ===
In Eurasia, IRI currently works in Armenia, Belarus, Georgia, Kazakhstan, Kyrgyz Republic, Moldova, Ukraine, and Uzbekistan. In 2016, it was designated as an "undesirable organization" in Russia.

=== Europe ===
In Europe, IRI operates in Albania, Bosnia and Herzegovina, Bulgaria, Kosovo, Montenegro, North Macedonia, Serbia, and Turkey.

=== Latin America and the Caribbean ===
In Latin America and the Caribbean, IRI operates in Argentina, Bolivia, Colombia, Cuba, Ecuador, El Salvador, Guatemala, Guyana, Haiti, Honduras, Mexico, Nicaragua, Panama, Peru, and Venezuela.

=== Middle East and North Africa ===
In the Middle East and North Africa, IRI operates in Algeria, Iraq, Jordan, Lebanon, Libya, Morocco, Syria, and Tunisia.

=== IRI Freedom Fund ===
The IRI Freedom Fund supports IRI's international operations.

== Recent publications ==
=== Asia-Pacific ===
Countering China's Information Manipulation: A Toolkit for Understanding and Action, September 6, 2023

Countering China's Information Manipulation in the Indo-Pacific and Kazakhstan, June 27, 2023

National Survey of Bangladesh | March–April 2023

Engaging Marginalized Youth in Laos, March 2, 2021

== See also ==
- National Democratic Institute for International Affairs
- National Endowment for Democracy
