= Young Russia (liberal movement) =

The All-Russian Political Social Movement "Young Russia" (Russian: Общероссийское Политическое Общественное Движение «Россия Молодая» (ОПОД «Россия Молодая»)) was a Russian liberal political movement “created on the Internet” which existed from 1998 to 2001. It was one of the founders of the electoral bloc Union of Right Forces. The head of the movement was the co-chairman of the People's Freedom Party and one of the leaders of the Solidarnost, Boris Nemtsov.

In 2001 the movement announced their decision to self-disband with the goal to join the Union of Right Forces, following a similar decision of Irina Khakamada's "Common Cause" («Общее дело») movement.
