= Zhanna Nemtsova =

Russian journalist and social activist (born 1984)

- Жанна Немцова
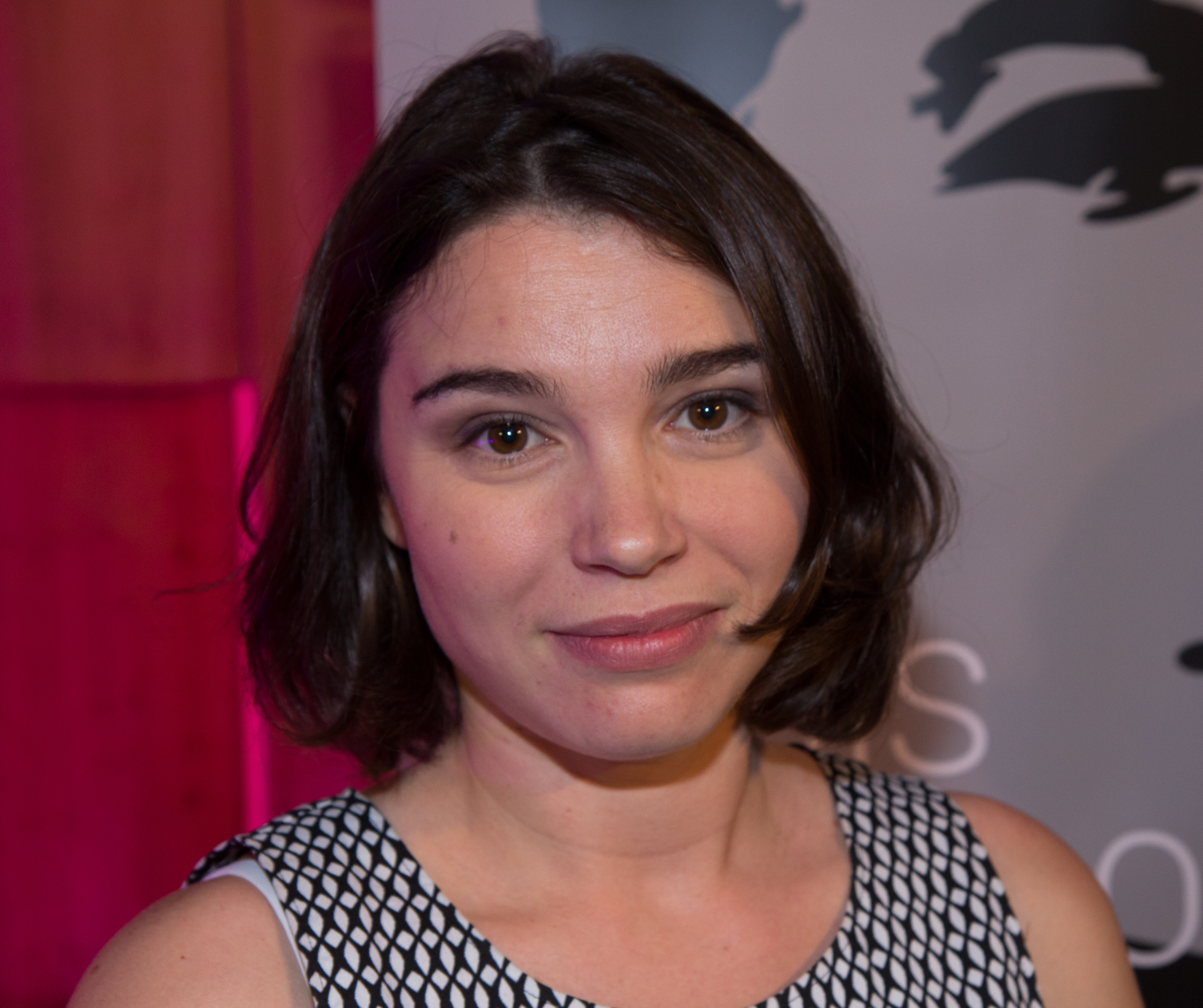
- Nemtsova in 2018
- Born: 26 March 1984 (age 42); Gorky, Russian SFSR, Soviet Union
- Education: Moscow State Institute of International Relations, Kutafin Moscow State Law University
- Occupations: Journalist, social activist
- Known for: Social activism in Russian opposition and support of her father
- Spouse: Dmitri Stepanov (m. 2007–2011)
- Father: Boris Nemtsov

Zhanna Borisovna Nemtsova (Russian: Жанна Борисовна Немцова; born 26 March 1984) is a Russian journalist and social activist. She is the daughter of Boris Nemtsov.

== Early life ==
Nemtsova was born in Gorky, Russian SFSR, Soviet Union (now Nizhny Novgorod, Russia) on 26 March 1984, to Russian politician Boris Nemtsov and part-Tatar investor Raisa Akhmetovna Nemtsova. She graduated from the Moscow State Institute of International Relations. Also in Moscow, she got her second degree in law from the Kutafin Moscow State Law University.

== Career ==
Nemtsova worked in the radio station Echo of Moscow, and managed her father's website. She later worked as an economic journalist for the Russian TV station RBK, anchoring broadcasts and interviewing representatives from businesses and politicians.

After her father was assassinated in February 2015, Nemtsova called for a proper investigation. She received threats, and, for her safety, emigrated from Russia in June 2015. Following the conviction of five men in connection with her father's assassination, she said: "This was not a full-fledged investigation, but an imitation".

In August 2015, Nemtsova began work as a reporter in the Russian department of the German international broadcaster Deutsche Welle in Bonn.

Nemtsova founded the Boris Nemtsov Foundation "For Freedom" the same year. The Foundation's projects include the annual Boris Nemtsov Award "For Courage in Defending Democratic Values", the Nemtsov Forum and a summer school in journalism.

In 2020, Nemtsova was appointed co-director of the Nemtsov Center, which was created by the Nemtsov Foundation and the Faculty of Philosophy of Charles University in Prague.

In addition to Russian, she is fluent in English and Portuguese.

== Boris Nemtsov Plaza ==
On 6 December 2017, Nemtsova traveled from Germany, accompanied by other family members and Russian dissidents, to urge members of the Washington, D.C. Council, the U.S. capital city's local government, to rename a portion of the street in front of the Russian Embassy “Boris Nemtsov Plaza” in honor of her father and as a signal to Russian authorities of US disapproval of their policies and of their alleged role in Nemtsov's assassination. Legislation to formally make the change was co-sponsored by the Council chairman, Phil Mendelson, who expected the bill to be approved by Council early in 2018. On 9 January 2018, the Council unanimously approved the “Boris Nemtsov Plaza Designation Act of 2017” which authorized the renaming, effective 5 May 2018.

== Prizes ==
On 4 August 2015, Nemtsova received the $1.1 million Solidarity Prize in Poland for advocating democracy and human rights.

She received an International Women of Courage Award in 2016.
