= List of streets renamed due to the Russian invasion of Ukraine =

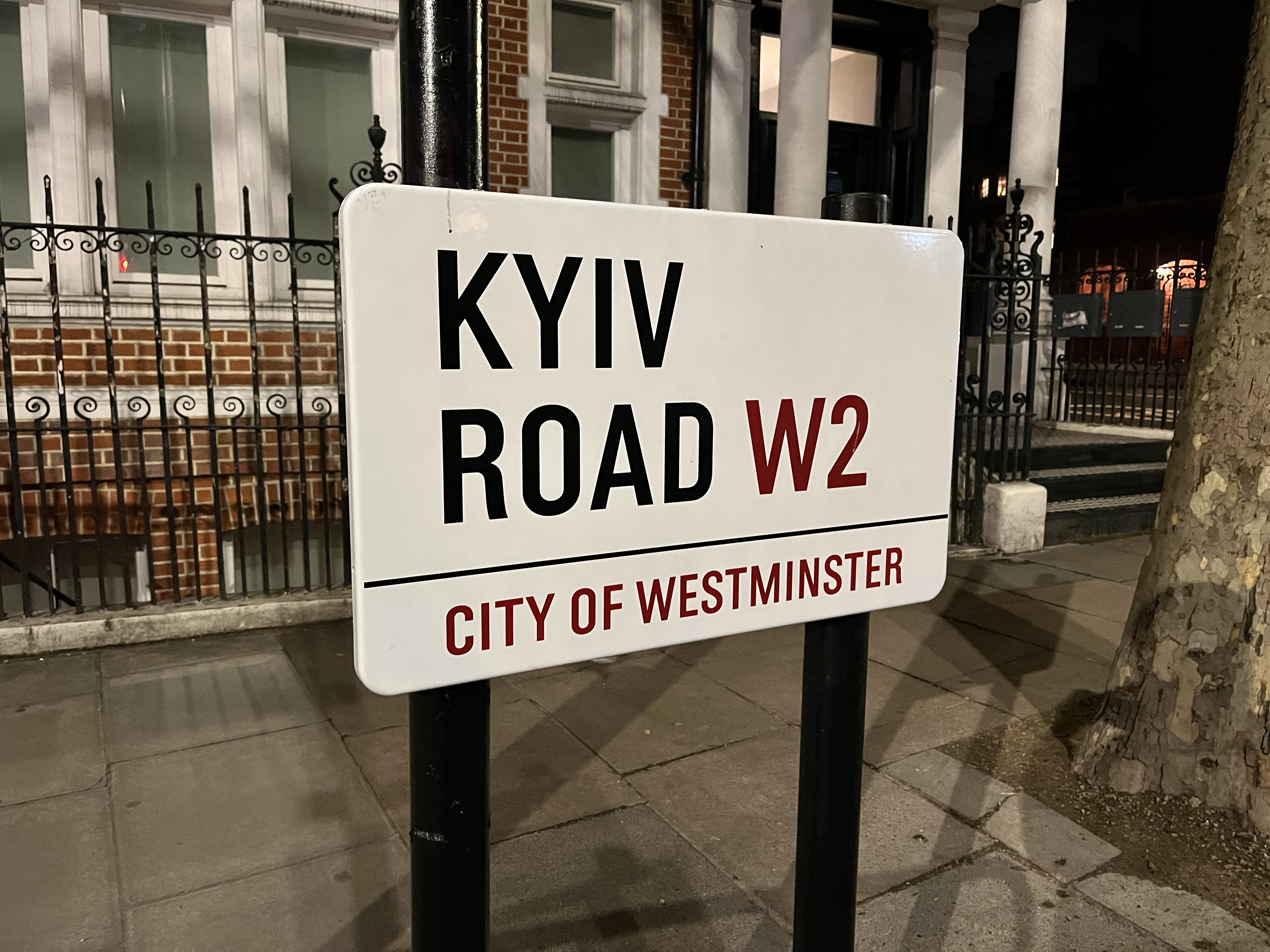
A 'Kyiv Road' road sign positioned opposite the Embassy of Russia, London

Following the Russian invasion of Ukraine in 2022, the One Philosophy consulting group together with the Ukrainian Ministry of Foreign Affairs launched a campaign called "Ukraine Street", which calls on nations to change the name of the streets where Russian embassies or consulates are located. Ukrainian foreign minister Dmytro Kuleba called the campaign part of an effort to "isolate Russia and de-Putinize the world." In addition, Ukraine has been conducting a campaign of derussification, removing addresses associated with Russian and Soviet history, and replacing them with names associated with Ukrainian history. The most streets were renamed in Zaporizhzhia Oblast (1.011), Vinnytsia Oblast (912), Odesa Oblast (581) and Kharkiv Oblast (656). While in Ternopil Oblast (22), Lviv Oblast (12) and Ivano-Frankivsk Oblast (3).

== Reactions ==
The spokesperson of the local council of San Ġwann in Malta rejected proposals to rename Triq Antonio Schembri, where the Russian embassy is located, or any of the surrounding streets, citing the impact it would have on residents of the street in question, such as forcing them to change their ID cards, driving licences and bank details.

The naming committee of Stockholm Municipality, Sweden, opposed calls to rename Gjörwellsgatan, where the Russian embassy in Stockholm is located, to "Zelenskygatan" ("Zelensky Street"). Its chairperson Olle Zetterberg cited the fact that streets in Stockholm usually aren't named after living people, and that there is no "good reason" to reject the current name. Instead, a section of a nearby park was renamed "Fria Ukrainas plats" ("Free Ukraine Place"; see below).

The City Council of The Hague, Netherlands rejected proposals to rename Andries Bickerweg, where the Russian embassy is located, stating that street names should only be changed out of "extreme necessity in the context of findability and safety", while also citing costs, paperwork and possible objections. In Zaandam, Netherlands some citizens changed certain street names by themselves by adding stickers on street signs, but these were removed. The same happened in a street in Prague, in the Czech Republic.

In Latvia, the renaming of 93 streets "glorifying the communist regime or russification policies" was proposed by the a group of historians of the Public Memory Center association. The surveyed municipalities conceptually did not object to the renaming, but cited associated difficulties and costs for residents and entrepreneurs located on these streets.

The Russian aggression in Ukraine has led the public to awaken from a misunderstood tolerance to the colonial legacy of the Soviets, which already borders on cowardice. The public has become more sensitive and more discerning. A draft law prepared by public activists on the renaming of the streets and other names of the Soviet regime has been submitted to the Saeima. The removal of these Soviet and Russian imperialist markers is not a technical issue. It is a matter of thinking and perceptions of the world of Latvians, and Latvian citizens. It's a matter of seeing ourselves as a European nation with our national culture and values. In this world, there is no room for signs of the ideology of Soviet invaders and Russian imperialism.

— President of Latvia Egils Levits, 17 October 2022

Riga City Council renamed streets named after Soviet Latvian Lieutenant General Detlavs Brantkalns, Soviet Russian author Valentin Pikul, Russian city Staraya Russa and Riga-born Soviet Russian mathematician Mstislav Keldysh. Rēzekne Municipality renamed streets named after the Latvian communist activists Lidija Samuilova and Jānis Zvīdra, as well as the Pioneer movement. Krāslava Municipality renamed streets named after the Bolshevik revolutionary Konstantin Eremeev, the Soviet Russian cosmonauts Yuri Gagarin and Valentina Tereshkova, and the Soviet Russian horticulturist Ivan Michurin. The choices of some new street names have stirred historical discussions between the residents of these streets, official institutions and historians.

As a consequence of support to Ukraine from various countries, streets have also been renamed in Ukraine in their honor.

== List ==
Country	City	Location	New name	Date	Status	Detail	Reference(s)
Albania	Tirana	Rruga Donika Kastrioti	Rruga Ukraina e Lirë (Free Ukraine Street)	7 March 2022	Official	The street runs by the Russian, Ukrainian, Serbian and Kosovan embassies. The Russian embassy moved out of the street in September 2022.	
Bulgaria	Sofia	Section of Dragan Tsankov Boulevard (Булевард Драган Цанков)	Aleya "Geroite na Ukraĭna" (Алея "Героите на Украйна"; Heroes of Ukraine Pathway)	September 9, 2022	Official	The street runs by the Russian embassy.	
Canada	Toronto	Section of St. Clair Avenue	Free Ukraine Square	20 March 2022	Honorary	The street runs by the Russian consulate general.	
Czech Republic
Czech Republic	Prague	Section of Korunovační	Ukrajinských hrdinů (Ukrainian Heroes)	24 March 2022	Official	The street runs by the Russian embassy.	
Czech Republic	Prague	Bridge between Prague 6 and Prague 7	Skakunův most (Skakun Bridge)	24 March 2022	Official	Previously unnamed bridge over a railway, between streets Ukrajinských hrdinů and the rest of Korunovační.	
Estonia	Tallinn	Previously unnamed square in Lembitu park	Ukraina väljak (Ukraine Square)	10 June 2022	Official		
France
France	Cannes	Section of place du Commandant Maria	Place Taras Chevtchenko (Taras Shevchenko Square)	16 May 2022	Official		
France	Paris	Garden outside the Petit Palais	Jardin de Kyiv – au Peuple ukrainien (Kyiv Garden – to the Ukrainian people)	24 August 2022	Official	The name notably uses the Ukrainian spelling (Kyiv) rather than the French spelling (Kiev), as the latter is identical to the city's name in Russian.	
Germany
Germany	Berlin-Lichtenberg	Previously unnamed square on Treskowallee, between Rheinsteinstraße and Ehrenfelsstraße	Odesaplatz (Odesa Square)	16 January 2023	Official		
Germany	Berlin-Steglitz-Zehlendorf	Previously unnamed green area on the intersection of Grunewaldstraße and Rothenburgstraße	Charkiw-Park (Kharkiv Park)	24 October 2022	Official		
Iceland	Reykjavík	Corner of Garðastræti and Túngata	Kænugarður - Kýiv-torg (Kænugarður/Kyiv Square)	April 27, 2022	Official	The square is located on the corner of Garðastræti and Túngata, amid a row of embassies, including Russia's.	
Latvia	Riga	Section of Antonijas iela	Ukrainas neatkarības iela (Ukrainian Independence Street)	10 March 2022	Official	The street runs by the Russian embassy.	
Lithuania	Vilnius	Section of Latvių gatvė	Ukrainos Didvyrių gatvė (Ukrainian Heroes’ Street)	10 March 2022	Official	The street runs by the Russian embassy.	
Luxembourg	Luxembourg City	Route nationale 3	Boulevard de Kyiv (Kyiv Boulevard)	18 August 2022	Official	The new name notably uses the Ukrainian spelling (Kyiv) rather than the French spelling (Kiev), as the latter is identical to the city's name in Russian.	
North Macedonia	Skopje	Part of ul. Nikola Kljusev (ул. „Никола Кљусев“)	Aleja na Ukraina („Алеја на Украина“; Ukraine Alley)	12 September 2022	Official		
Norway	Oslo	Intersection on Drammensveien	Ukrainas plass (Ukraine Square)	8 March 2022	Official	The street runs by the Russian embassy.	
Poland
Poland	Gdańsk	Intersection of ul. Partyzantów and ul. Matki Polki	Skwer Bohaterskiego Mariupola (Heroic Mariupol Square)	1 July 2022	Official	The area in Gdańsk's Wrzeszcz district, not far from the Russian consulate general.	
Poland	Gdynia	Part of ul. Armii Krajowej	Plac Wolnej Ukrainy (Free Ukraine Place)	28 April 2022	Official		
Poland	Kraków	Part of plac Biskupi	Skwer Wolnej Ukrainy (Free Ukraine Square)	12 July 2022	Official	The square is located in front of the Russian consulate general.	
Poland	Poznań	Near most Świętego Rocha, at the intersection of ul. Serafitek and ul. Trasa Kórnicka	Skweru Obrońców Ukrainy 2022 (Defenders of Ukraine 2022 Square)	23 June 2022	Official		
Poland	Warsaw	Pedestrian and bicycle path on ul. Belwederska, from ul. Bagatela to the intersection with ul. Spacerowa	Aleja Ofiar Rosyjskiej Agresji (Alley of Victims of Russian Aggression)	20 November 2022	Official	The alley is located in front of the Russian embassy.	
Spain	Fuentes de Andalucía	Various	Various	10 April 2022	Temporary	For two weeks, the city was renamed Ucrania (Ukraine). Sixteen streets and plazas were renamed after Ukrainian cities, including Kyiv, Mariúpol, Jarkov, Jerson and Odesa, along with other areas in the world experiencing conflicts.	
Sweden	Stockholm	Part of Mariebergsparken	Fria Ukrainas plats (Free Ukraine Place)	April 29, 2022	Official	Located next to the Russian embassy in Stockholm. A bus stop close to the embassy, previously named Fyrverkarbacken, was also renamed Fria Ukrainas plats in June 2023.	
Ukraine
Ukraine	Fontanka	Vulytsya Mayakovsʹkoho (Вулиця Маяковського; Mayakovsky Street)	Vulytsya Borysa Dzhonsona (Вулиця Бориса Джонсона; Boris Johnson Street)	Not yet applied	Planned; issue ordered	Named in honor of Boris Johnson, the prime minister of the United Kingdom, for his and the United Kingdom's help to Ukraine during the Russian invasion.	
Ukraine	Kharkiv	Moskovsʹkyy prospekt (Московський проспект; Moscow Avenue)	Prospekt Heroyiv Kharkova (Проспект Героїв Харкова; Heroes of Kharkiv Avenue)	May 11, 2022	Official		
Ukraine	Kharkiv	Bilhorodsʹkyy uzviz (Білгородський узвіз; Belgorod Descent)	Vulytsya Heroyiv Ryatuvalʹnykiv (Вулиця Героїв Рятувальників; Heroes – Rescuers Street)	May 11, 2022	Official		
Ukraine	Kharkiv	Bilhorodsʹke shose (Білгородське шосе; Belgorod Highway)	Kharkivsʹke shose (Харківське шосе; Kharkiv Highway)	May 11, 2022	Official		
Ukraine	Kyiv; Darnytskyi District	Vulytsya Karla Marksa (Вулиця Карла Маркса; Karl Marx Street)	Vulytsya Yohanna Volʹfhanha Gete (Вулиця Йоганна Вольфганга Ґете; Johann Wolfgang Goethe Street)	28 October 2022	Official		
Ukraine	Kyiv; Darnytskyi District	Kronshtadtsʹka vulytsya (Кронштадтська вулиця; Kronstadt Street)	Vulytsya Volodymyra Rybaka (Вулиця Володимира Рибака; Volodymyr Rybak Street)	28 October 2022	Official		
Ukraine	Kyiv; Darnytskyi District	Slavhorodsʹka vulytsya (Славгородська вулиця; Slavgorod Street)	Vulytsya Denysa Antipova (Вулиця Дениса Антіпова; Denys Antipov Street)	28 October 2022	Official		
Ukraine	Kyiv; Holosiivskyi District	Zhyhulivsʹka vulytsya (Жигулівська вулиця; Zhiguli Street)	Beskydsʹka vulytsya (Бескидська вулиця; Beskyd Street)	28 October 2022	Official		
Ukraine	Kyiv; Holosiivskyi District	Maykopsʹka vulytsya (Майкопська вулиця; Maykop Street)	Hetʹmansʹka vulytsya (Гетьманська вулиця; Hetman Street)	28 October 2022	Official		
Ukraine	Kyiv; Holosiivskyi District	Vulytsya Burmystenka (Вулиця Бурмистенка; Burmystenko Street)	Orikhuvatsʹka vulytsya (Оріхуватська вулиця; Orikhuvatska Street)	28 October 2022	Official		
Ukraine	Kyiv; Holosiivskyi District	Vulytsya Henerala Rodymtseva (Вулиця Генерала Родимцева; General Rodimtsev Street)	Вулиця Горіхуватський шлях (Orikhuvatskyi shlach Street)	28 October 2022	Official		
Ukraine	Kyiv; Holosiivskyi District	Vulytsya Akademika Vilʹyamsa (Вулиця Академіка Вільямса; Academic Williams Street)	Vulytsya Stepana Rudnytsʹkoho (Вулиця Степана Рудницького; Stepan Rudnytskyi Street)	28 October 2022	Official		
Ukraine	Kyiv; Holosiivskyi District	Vulytsya Henerala Dovatora (Вулиця Генерала Доватора; General Dovator Street)	Vulytsya Kateryny Hrushevsʹkoyi (Вулиця Катерини Грушевської; Kateryna Hrushevska Street)	28 October 2022	Official		
Ukraine	Kyiv; Holosiivskyi District	Vulytsya Akademika Kostycheva (Вулиця Академіка Костичева; Academic Kostychev Street)	Vulytsya Profesora Balinsʹkoho (Вулиця Професора Балінського; Professor Balinsky Street)	28 October 2022	Official		
Ukraine	Kyiv; Holosiivskyi District	Smolʹnaya vulytsya (Смольная улица; Smolny Street)	Vulytsya Brativ Chuchupakiv (Вулиця Братів Чучупаків; Brothers Chuchupak Street; after Vasyl, Oleksa and Petro Chuchupak)	28 October 2022	Official		
Ukraine	Kyiv; Holosiivskyi District	Amursʹka ploshcha (Амурська площа; Amur Square)	Vasylʹkivsʹka ploshcha (Васильківська площа; Vasylkiv Square)	28 October 2022	Official		
Ukraine	Kyiv; Shevchenkivskyi District	Vulytsya Nekrasivsʹka (Вулиця Некрасівська; Nekrasov Street)	Vulytsya Ivana Dracha (Вулиця Івана Драча; Ivan Drach Street)	28 October 2022	Official		
Ukraine	Kyiv; Shevchenkivskyi District	Vulytsya Pushkinsʹka (Вулиця Пушкінська; Pushkin Street)	Vulytsya Yevhena Chykalenka (Вулиця Євгена Чикаленка; Yevhen Chykalenko Street)	28 October 2022	Official		
Ukraine	Kyiv; Shevchenkivskyi District	Muromsʹka vulytsya (Муромська вулиця; Murom Street)	Vulytsya Volodymyra Zhabotynsʹkoho (Вулиця Володимира Жаботинського; Volodymyr Zhabotynskyy Street)	28 October 2022	Official		
Ukraine	Kyiv; Shevchenkivskyi District	Vulytsya Borysa Zhytkova (Вулиця Бориса Житкова; Boris Zhitkov Street)	Vulytsya Brativ Malakovyy (Улица Братьев Малаковых; Brothers Malakov Street; after Dmytro and George Malakov)	28 October 2022	Official		
Ukraine	Kyiv; Shevchenkivskyi District	Krasnodarsʹka vulytsya (Краснодарська вулиця; Krasnodar Street)	Vulytsya Goldy Meyir (Вулиця Ґолди Меїр; Golda Meir Street)	28 October 2022	Official		
Ukraine	Kyiv; Shevchenkivskyi District	Vulytsya Chaplyhina (Вулиця Чаплигіна; Chaplygin Street)	Vulytsya Akademika Ivakhnenka (Вулиця Академіка Івахненка; Academic Ivakhnenko Street)	28 October 2022	Official		
Ukraine	Kyiv; Shevchenkivskyi District	Provulok Chaplyhina (Провулок Чаплигіна; Chaplygin Lane)	Provulok Akademika Ivakhnenka (Провулок Академіка Івахненка; Academic Ivakhnenko Lane)	28 October 2022	Official		
Ukraine	Kyiv; Dniprovskyi District	Astrakhansʹka vulytsya (Астраханська вулиця; Astrakhan Street)	Vulytsya Kastusya Kalynovsʹkoho (Вулиця Кастуся Калиновського; Kastusya Kalynovskyy Street)	28 October 2022	Official		
Ukraine	Kyiv; Desnianskyi District	Vulytsya Karla Marksa (Вулиця Карла Маркса; Karl Marx Street)	Vulytsya Oleksiya Kurinnoho (Вулиця Олексія Курінного; Oleksiy Kurinnyi Street)	28 October 2022	Official		
Ukraine	Kyiv; Desnianskyi District	Vulytsya Makarenka (Вулиця Макаренка; Makarenko Street)	Vulytsya Klymenta Kvitky (Вулиця Климента Квітки; Klyment Kvitka Street	28 October 2022	Official		
Ukraine	Kyiv; Solomianskyi District	Vulytsya Bahrationa (Вулиця Багратіона; Bagration Street)	Vulytsya Maksyma Levina (Вулиця Максима Левіна; Maks Levin Street)	28 October 2022	Official		
Ukraine	Kyiv; Solomianskyi District	Vulytsya Martyrosyana (Вулиця Мартиросяна; Martirosyan Street)	Vulytsya Serhiya Berehovoho (Вулиця Сергія Берегового; Serhiy Berehovoy Street)	28 October 2022	Official		
Ukraine	Kyiv; Solomianskyi District	Moskovsʹkyy provulok (Московський провулок; Moscow Lane)	Provulok Pavla Li (Провулок Павла Лі; Pavlo Lee Lane)	28 October 2022	Official		
Ukraine	Kyiv; Podilskyi District	Brestsʹka vulytsya (Брестська вулиця; Brest Street)	Vulytsya Frantsyska Skoryny (Вулиця Франциска Скорини; Francysk Skaryna Street)	28 October 2022	Official		
Ukraine	Kyiv; Podilskyi District	Vulytsya Odoyevsʹkoho (Вулиця Одоєвського; Odoevsky Street)	Vulytsya Bayrona (Вулиця Байрона; Byron Street)	28 October 2022	Official		
Ukraine	Kyiv; Podilskyi District	Provulok Oleksandra Bestuzheva (Провулок Олександра Бестужева; Alexander Bestuzhev Lane)	Provulok Kuzʹmy Skryabina (Провулок Кузьми Скрябіна; Kuzma Skryabin Lane)	28 October 2022	Official		
Ukraine	Kyiv; Svyatoshynskyi District	Vulytsya Henerala Vitruka (Вулиця Генерала Вітрука; General Vitruk Street)	Vulytsya Aviakonstruktora (Вулиця Авіаконструктора; Aviakonstrukturska Street)	28 October 2022	Official		
Ukraine	Kyiv; Svyatoshynskyi District	Bulʹvar Romena Rollana (Бульвар Ромена Роллана; Romain Rolland Boulevard)	Bulʹvar Zhulya Verna (Бульвар Жуля Верна; Jules Verne Boulevard)	28 October 2022	Official		
Ukraine	Kyiv; Svyatoshynskyi District	Vulytsya Harshyna (Вулиця Гаршина; Garshin Street)	Vulytsya Vasylya Stefanyka (Вулиця Василя Стефаника; Vasyl Stefanyk Street)	28 October 2022	Official		
Ukraine	Kyiv; Svyatoshynskyi District	Vulytsya Zholudyeva (Вулиця Жолудєва; Zholudev Street)	Vulytsya Oleksandra Makhova (Вулиця Олександра Махова; Oleksandr Makhov Street)	28 October 2022	Official		
Ukraine	Kyiv; Svyatoshynskyi District	Vulytsya Kulibina (Вулиця Кулібіна; Kulibin Street)	Vulytsya Rene Dekarta (Вулиця Рене Декарта; René Descartes Street)	28 October 2022	Official		
Ukraine	Kyiv; Svyatoshynskyi District	Vulytsya Petra Chaadayeva (Вулиця Петра Чаадаєва; Pyotr Chaadayev Street)	Vulytsya Dmytra Chyzhevsʹkoho (Вулиця Дмитра Чижевського; Dmytro Chyzhevsky Street)	28 October 2022	Official		
Ukraine	Kyiv; Svyatoshynskyi District	Vulytsya Feodora Pushyna (Вулиця Феодора Пушина; Fedora Pushina Street)	Vulytsya Oresta Vaskula (Вулиця Ореста Васкула; Orest Vaskul Street)	28 October 2022	Official		
Ukraine	Kyiv; Svyatoshynskyi District	Ploshcha Heroyiv Bresta (Площа Героїв Бреста; Heroes of Brest Square)	Chornobayivsʹka ploshcha (Чорнобаївська площа; Chornobaivska Square)	28 October 2022	Official		
Ukraine	Kyiv; Svyatoshynskyi District	Yakutsʹka vulytsya (Якутська вулиця; Yakutska Street)	Vulytsya Rodyny Bunge (Вулиця Родини Бунґе; Bunge Family Street)	28 October 2022	Official		
Ukraine	Kyiv; Obolonskyi District	Vulytsya Marshala Tymoshenka (Вулиця Маршала Тимошенка; Marshal Timoshenko Street)	Vulytsya Levka Luk'yanenka (Вулиця Левка Лук'яненка; Levko Lukianenko Street)	28 October 2022	Official		
Ukraine	Kyiv; Obolonskyi District	Vulytsya Novykova-Pryboya (Вулиця Новикова-Прибоя; Novikov-Priboy Street)	Vulytsya Iryny Zhylenko (Вулиця Ірини Жиленко; Iryna Zhylenko Street)	28 October 2022	Official		
Ukraine	Kyiv; Obolonskyi District	Vulytsya Klary Tsetkin (Вулиця Клари Цеткін; Clara Zetkin Street)	Vulytsya Dniprovoyi Chayky (Вулиця Дніпрової Чайки; Dniprova Chayka Street)	28 October 2022	Official		
Ukraine	Kyiv; Pecherskyi District	Vulytsya Hlazunova (Вулиця Глазунова; Glazunov Street)	Vulytsya Dmytra Hodzenka (Вулиця Дмитра Годзенка; Dmytro Hodzenko Street)	28 October 2022	Official		
Ukraine	Kyiv; Pecherskyi District	Vulytsya Lizy Chaykinoyi (Вулиця Лізи Чайкіної; Liza Chaikina Street)	Vulytsya Oleny Stepaniv (Вулиця Олени Степанів; Olena Stepaniv Street)	28 October 2022	Official		
Ukraine	Kyiv; Pecherskyi District	Vulytsya Oleksandra Matrosova (Вулиця Олександра Матросова; Alexander Matrosov Street)	Vulytsya Henerala Kulʹchytsʹkoho (Вулиця Генерала Кульчицького; General Kulchytskyi Street)	28 October 2022	Official		
Ukraine	Kyiv; Pecherskyi District	Vulytsya Chyhorina (Вулиця Чигоріна; Chigorin Street)	Vulytsya Dmytra Doroshenka (Вулиця Дмитра Дорошенка; Dmytro Doroshenko Street)	28 October 2022	Official		
United Kingdom
United Kingdom	Harlow	Fifth Avenue	Fifth Avenue – Zelenskyy Avenue	21 July 2023	Official		
United Kingdom	London	Section of Bayswater Road	Kyiv Road	24 February 2023	Honorary	The section of the road is opposite the Russian embassy.	
United States of America	New York City, New York	Corner of Brighton Beach Avenue and Coney Island Avenue	Ukrainian Way	24 August 2022	Official		

== See also ==
- List of Ukrainian toponyms that were changed as part of decommunization in 2016
- List of renamed cities in Ukraine
- List of politically motivated renamings
- List of street names changed around diplomatic mission buildings for political reasons
- Derussification in Ukraine
  - Demolition of monuments to Vladimir Lenin in Ukraine
