= Street name controversy =

Controversy over street names

A street name controversy is a conflict over a public road or street name, also including alleys, squares, parks, quays and motorways.

== Background ==
Street names may become controversial when the person, organization, or event they honor is no longer considered deserving, when the names in an area are viewed as unrepresentative of its population, or when signs use disputed languages, scripts, or hard to remember spellings.

== Notable examples ==
=== Austria ===
World War II

In post-war Austria, Franz Langoth was long viewed as a "good" Nazi who bore no responsibility for the excesses of the regime. Therefore, in 1973, a street in his hometown Linz, where he served as mayor in 1944–1945, was renamed Langothstraße. But Langoth always maintained his national-socialist beliefs and publicly defended them. For this reason, the street name was eventually restored to its original name of Kaisergasse in 1986.

=== Belgium ===
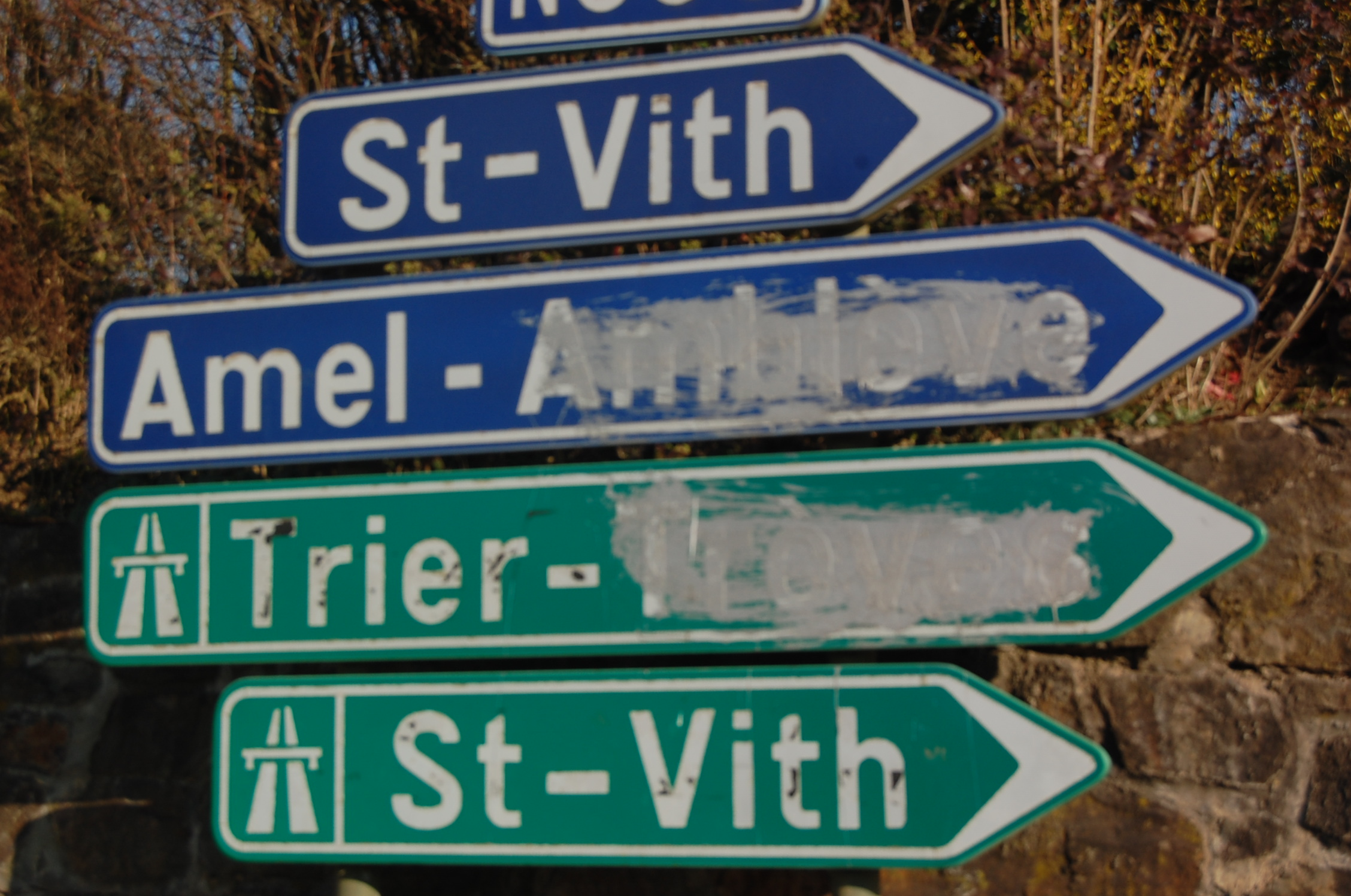
French names defaced in the village of Recht in the German-speaking Community of Belgium

Language struggle

In the Brussels Capital Region and the municipalities with language facilities, both street names and road signs are officially bilingual. Language activists from several sides are however arguing that these should be monolingual in certain areas in favour of their own language, and that other languages do not "belong" on the signs there. Some even experience this as a kind of colonisation of their own language area. Therefore, these activists sometimes vandalise street name signs and road signs by making the undesired language illegible. This is especially common in the linguistic conflict in Voeren.

Others opine that bilingualism of street names is good for individual understanding and mutual tolerance, and that one name is not necessarily "better" than another. They tend to reject resistance to multilingual signs as needlessly hostile and territorial behaviour towards speakers of other languages. In the end, the meaning of the names is the same, and merely spelt differently, or a direct translation of the same word.

World War II

- The Cyriel Verschaeve street in Lanaken was named after Catholic priest Cyriel Verschaeve (1874–1949), who openly collaborated with the Nazis during World War II, and was therefore convicted and sentenced to death in absentia by the Belgian authorities in 1946. The municipality let its inhabitants choose a new name themselves; the majority voted in favour of "Anne Frank street".

=== Brazil ===
World War II

In 1942, because of anti-Italian sentiment in Brazil during World War II, after a complaint from the National Defense League, the central square of Caxias do Sul, named after Dante Alighieri, was renamed Ruy Barbosa square, and Avenida Itália (Italy Avenue) became Avenida Brasil (Brazil Avenue). They were renamed back in 1990.

Military dictatorship

In 2014, the city council of Porto Alegre renamed Castelo Branco Avenue, named after the first president of the Brazilian military dictatorship, to Avenida Legalidade e da Democracia (Legality and Democracy Avenue), referencing the movement dubbed Campanha da Legalidade (Legality Campaign) which sought to keep João Goulart in the presidency in 1961. In 2018, the avenue was renamed again to Castello Branco (with an additional "L") after appeals in court claiming that the decision, which was taken by simple majority, should have had a 2/3 majority in the council.

=== Germany ===
Cold War

In former East Germany (officially German Democratic Republic or DDR), many street names still refer to the communist era.

- For example, 613 streets and squares have been named after Ernst Thälmann, the leader of the Communist Party of Germany who was executed in Buchenwald concentration camp by the Nazis. Critics argue that he may deserve some street names here and there, but this overload of commemorations has pressed too much of a communist presence in the public sphere.
- The Kaiserhof underground railway station in Berlin was opened in 1908, in 1950 renamed Thälmannplatz (after the nearby square that was called Wilhelmplatz until 1949), in 1986 renamed Otto-Grotewohl-Straße (after Otto Grotewohl, East German Prime Minister 1949–1960) and in 1992 renamed Mohrenstraße. The Thälmannplatz was abolished in 1987 and added to the Otto-Grotewohl-Straße, which has been restored as Wilhelmstraße in 1992. In 2020, the city announced that Mohrenstraße would be renamed "Anton-Wilhelm-Amo-Straße" for different reasons, namely that the term "Mohren" (Moors) was considered racist by many inhabitants; instead, Anton Wilhelm Amo was honoured for having been the first African person to graduate at a European university.

=== Morocco ===
French colonialism versus Moroccan nationalism

Morocco still has many Francophone street names from the French colonial era. Arab nationalists have pressured the government to Arabise these, and named them after Moroccan national heroes, but Amazigh activists feel they have been ignored, and argue for not forgetting to acknowledge their language and culture in the process of decolonisation.

Amazigh versus Palestinian names

In July 2018, the city council of Agadir decided to change the Amazigh names of several streets into names of Palestinian cities to show solidarity with the Palestinian question. Although some Amazigh activists agreed that solidarity with Palestine was a good cause, they regarded the decision as an attempt to erase Amazigh culture and history. Other activists were completely opposed to the move, and did not see any advantage to the Palestinian cause in it, merely an arabising attack on Amazigh identity.

Arabic script versus Tifinagh

In the Moroccan city of Agadir, the 80% Tamazight-speaking majority of the population complained that street name signs and road signs were only drawn up in Arabic with Arabic script and in French with Latin script. Activists from the Tamazight language emancipation movement considered this a form of discrimination, and en masse pleaded for the addition of Tamazight names in Tifinagh script, which was approved and introduced by the city council in August 2019.

Salafists from Gulf states

In May 2020, controversy arose around the naming of streets after Salafist extremists from the Arab states of the Persian Gulf in the suburb Témara of the Moroccan capital Rabat.

=== Netherlands ===
Municipal authorities can establish rules in order to regulate the naming of streets. Such rules aim for recognisability, utility and personality.

A well-known rule which all Dutch municipalities maintain is that a street cannot be named after a person until a specific number of years after their death. This rule has been introduced in order to prevent a living person still committing a crime or otherwise contemptible act (or this being discovered shortly after their death), after which the honour of a street name might no longer be reasonable. The Dutch royal house is exempt from this rule: from the moment a new prince(ss) is born, public streets and roads may be named after them. Critics argue that this implies the Orange family will be living exemplary lives until the day they die, while, despite the high average popularity of the royals, they too are merely fallible human beings who could commit (major) mistakes and should not be accorded places of honour beforehand.

Language struggle in Friesland

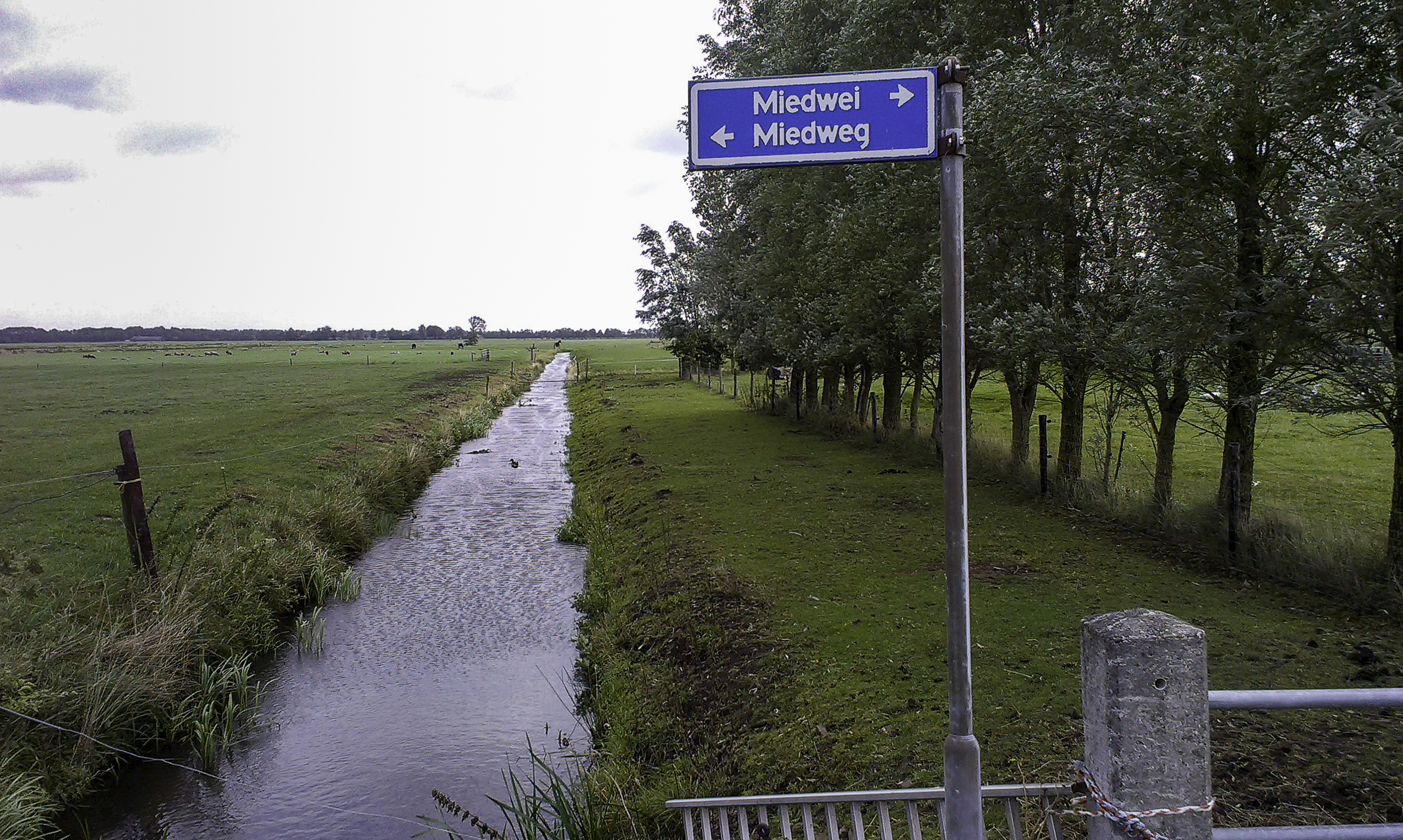
Separation between Miedweg and Miedwei at the border between Stroobos and Surhuizum

West Frisian language advocates, including the provincial government and several political parties since the 1960s, argue that in the entire province of Friesland (West Frisian and official name: Fryslân), or at least the areas where West Frisian speakers are in the majority (outside of the major cities, dominated by the Stadsfries dialects that are closely related to the Dutch language), are provided West Frisian street name signs and road signs in order to protect West Frisian culture. Opponents of such Frisification claim that these efforts will worsen the segregation between Frisophones and Neerlandophones, lead to needless confusion and costs, or that certain historical values will be lost by name changes. As of 2011, most traffic signs in Friesland's municipalities are bilingual, with the Dutch name on top and the Frisian name at the bottom; a minority of signs is monolingually Frisian, and some places have exclusively Dutch signs. In practice, the road signs do not necessarily give an indication of the relative presence of West Frisian speakers in a municipality: Leeuwarden and Harlingen, for example, have bilingual signs, but Frisian speakers constitute only a small minority of the inhabitants, whereas overwhelmingly Frisian-speaking Achtkarspelen features only Dutch-language street name signs.

Colonial past overseas

An important part of public discourse surrounding street names in the Netherlands is concerned with its colonial heritage, especially the Dutch East India Company (VOC) and the Dutch East Indies. The colonial street name controversies usually focus on the personalities of Jan Pieterszoon Coen for his role in the Dutch conquest of the Banda Islands (especially the Battle of Banda Besar in 1621), and J. B. van Heutsz because of his part in the Aceh War and the 1906 and 1908 Bali interventions. Activists tend to target the Coen Tunnel and Second Coen Tunnel in Amsterdam.

- Several Dutch cities have a Jan Pieterszoon Coen street, including The Hague and Utrecht, and Amsterdam has a Coenhaven (Coen Port, since 1921), a Coen Tunnel (since 1966) and a Second Coen Tunnel (since 2013). Several interest groups such as De Grauwe Eeuw ("The Grim Age", a word play on The Golden Age) have requested that the municipalities involved change these names, and the municipalities initially agreed to negotiate. However, when De Grauwe Eeuw threatened to perform acts of vandalism to enforce the name changes, cooperation was immediately discontinued. In July 2020, activist group Helden van Nooit defaced the street name signs of the Jan Pieterszoon Coenstraat and the Van Heutszstraat in the Utrecht residential area of Lombok/Leidseweg with red paint, symbolising the blood that has been spilt by these and eight other Dutch colonists with street names in this quarter; the group demanded all ten streets would be "decolonised". Reactions to the act were mixed: the municipality of Utrecht reported destruction of property to the police, with a spokesperson saying that "it is important to have this discussion, but the solution is not to amend street names, but to raise awareness." Some neighbourhood residents and city councillors judged the situation differently, and argued that the street names had to or were allowed to be changed if people had problems with it.
- Some cities in the Netherlands have a Witte de With street, including The Hague and Eindhoven. In the latter, locals and De Grauwe Eeuw asked for a name change in coordination with the municipality; as a corsair, Witte de With had been instrumental in the Dutch colonisation of the East Indies. Because many residents of the quarter were Dutch Turks, their request was granted for adjusting the street name to Barbarosstraat, a reference to the Turkish admiral Hayreddin Barbarossa (Turkish: Barbaros Hayrettin). However, because he also was a corsair and slave trader, not everyone agreed, and a new controversy arose. The Witte de Withstraat in The Hague also aroused disputes, but that street name has not been changed so far.

Cold War

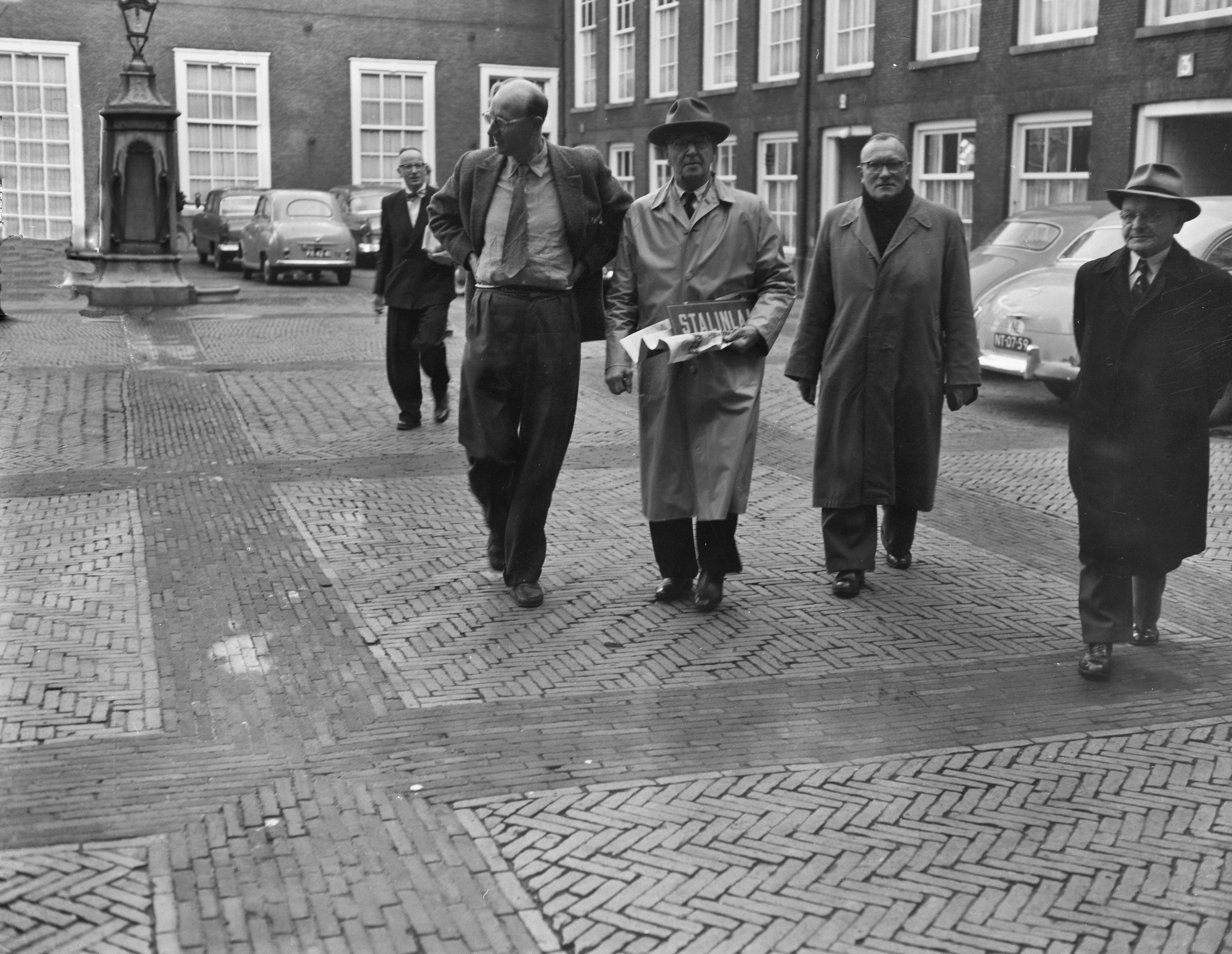
Activists remove a "Stalin Lane" sign during the Hungarian Revolution of 1956.

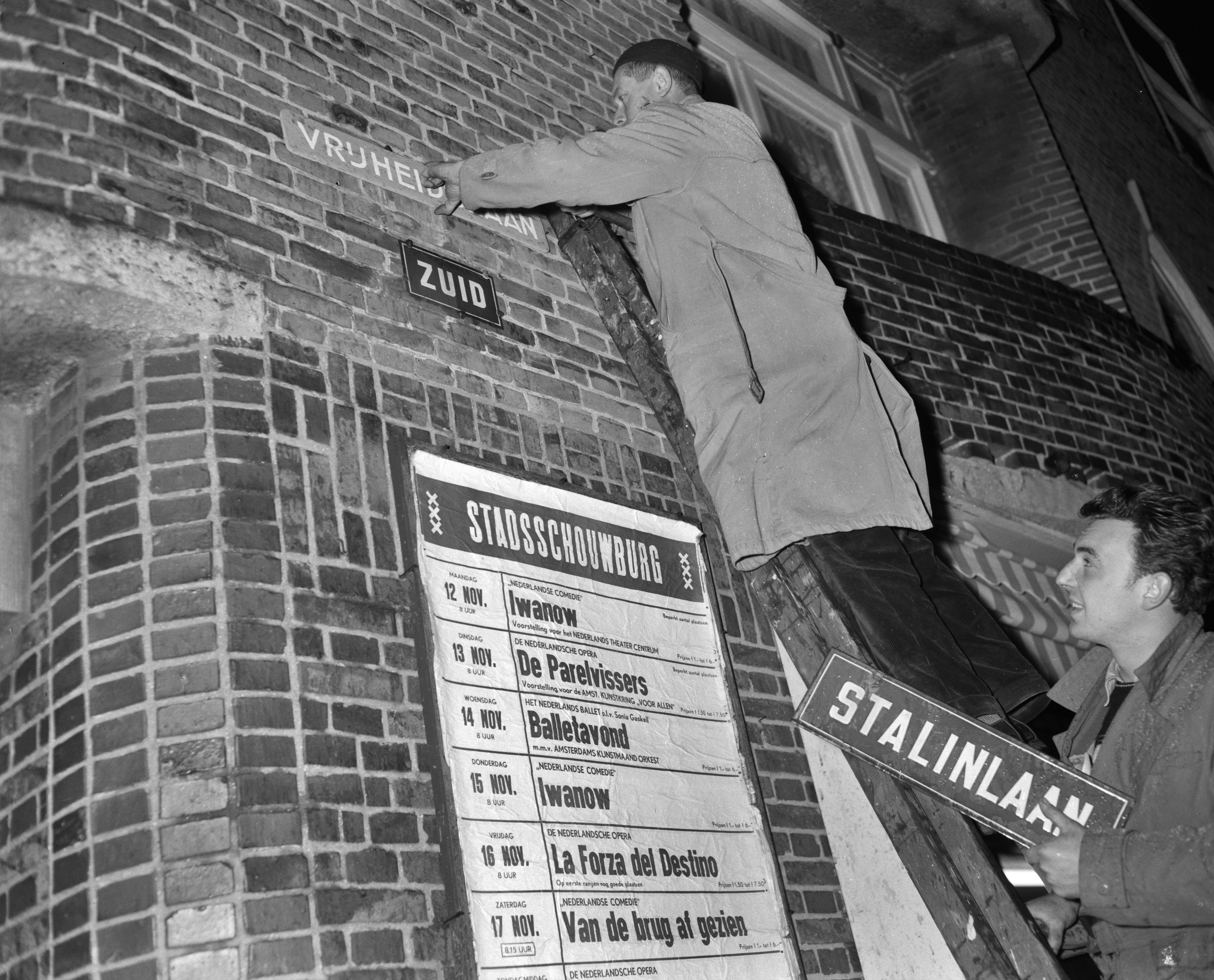
Stalin Lane is officially renamed Freedom lane shortly after the revolution.

- In 1946, three avenues in Amsterdam were given new names in honour of The Big Three leaders who had defeated Nazi Germany: Franklin Delano Roosevelt ("Rooseveltlaan", previously "Zuider Amstellaan"), Winston Churchill ("Churchill-laan", previously "Noorder Amstellaan") and Joseph Stalin ("Stalinlaan" or "Stalin lane", previously "Amstellaan"). After Stalin died in 1953, the period of De-Stalinisation followed: a break from Stalin's personality cult and attempts to formulate a less autocratic policy in the Soviet Union and its Warsaw Pact satellite states. Elsewhere in Europe, Stalin was also viewed more critically. When the Hungarian Uprising, another consequence of the De-Stalinisation, was bloodily crushed by the Red Army on 4 November 1956, this led to great outrage in the Western Bloc. Protesting this turn of events, activists removed the street name sign of the Stalinlaan, and replaced it with "4 Novemberlaan"; on 14 November 1956, the street was officially renamed "Vrijheidslaan" ("Freedom lane").

Catholic Church sexual abuse cases

Sometimes, street names have been changed after cases of sexual abuse in the Catholic Church in the Netherlands (from 2010) have been exposed to the public.

- Pastor Visser worked from 1961 until his death in 1977 in the Catholic-majority village of Vasse in the municipality of Tubbergen, which earned him the Pastoor Visserstraat. In April 2010, however, several people came forward saying they had been victims of sexual abuse by pastor Visser; suspicions were raised that altogether, there were perhaps as many as dozens of victims. According to locals, Visser's abusive behaviour, or at least suspicions thereof, had been known for about 25 to 30 years, but nobody acted on it, and it remained a public secret. The 2010 investigation of former Education Minister Wim Deetman eventually confirmed that Visser had abused several boys. Victims and local residents wanted to change the street's name, and the municipality soon converted it into "De Schoolkolk".
- Theo Holtslag was appointed pastor in Haarle in 1969. In this formerly predominantly Catholic village in the municipality of Hellendoorn, almost everyone knew Holtslag, who had a reputation of being closely "involved" in the local community. After his death in 1989, the Holtslagweg was named in his honour. Nevertheless, in the early 2010s, mayor Anneke Raven was contacted by someone who claimed to have been sexually abused by pastor Holtslag when he was an underage boy. The Roman Catholic Archdiocese of Utrecht confirmed the allegation in an official letter. It is not known whether Holtslag has victimised anyone else. The pastor's former parish was informed about the sexual abuse, and on 2 December 2014, the municipality informed the inhabitants of the Holtslagweg that the street's name would therefore be changed in joint agreement with them. Residents and old acquaintances of the pastor reacted with shock and dismay, and said they had not known about it (one resident himself had been one of Holtslag's altar servers); everyone agreed that amending the street name was the proper course of action. Acting mayor Johan Coes motivated the decision: "Usually it's an honorary recognition, naming a street after someone, and uh... well, that is no longer the case here now."

Representativity

As of 2020, 85% of all Dutch streets' personal names referred to men. The municipality of Utrecht therefore decided to name all streets in the new Heldinnenwijk ("Heroines' Quarter") after women who were active in the Dutch resistance during World War II, with the proviso that they had only committed non-violent acts of resistance. In the municipality of Putten, a new residential area featured 12 streets named after Putten women who were determined to have done something extraordinarily brave, such as Trientje Timmer who had helped people to go in hiding from the Nazis during World War II.

Logistical objections

Getting ambulances, firefighters or police vehicles at the correct place in time can be a matter of life and death, making the communication of the street name of vital importance. For example, if the city of Amsterdam had a "Klaverstraat" in addition to its Kalverstraat, a reading or typing error could be fatal. Moreover, mail carriers, other services and citizens can end up confused as well. Street names should therefore be different enough to avoid probable mistakes. The town of Maasbracht actually has both a Kalverstraat and a Klaverstraat, but the distance between them is only a 3-minute car drive, and is therefore not considered an urgent problem.

Economic objections

Companies at the Noorderkade in Alkmaar mounted resistance when the municipality announced on 30 March 2013 that their street was going to be renamed Koning Willem-Alexanderkade ("King Willem-Alexander Quay") on the occasion of the inauguration of Willem-Alexander on 30 April 2013. The companies complained that they had invested a lot of money in their reputation with their current address, and were not prepared to carry the extra costs of address changes and the risk of losing customers. The municipality conceded to the objections, and instead renamed the Sportlaan to Koning Willem-Alexanderlaan.

=== Spain ===
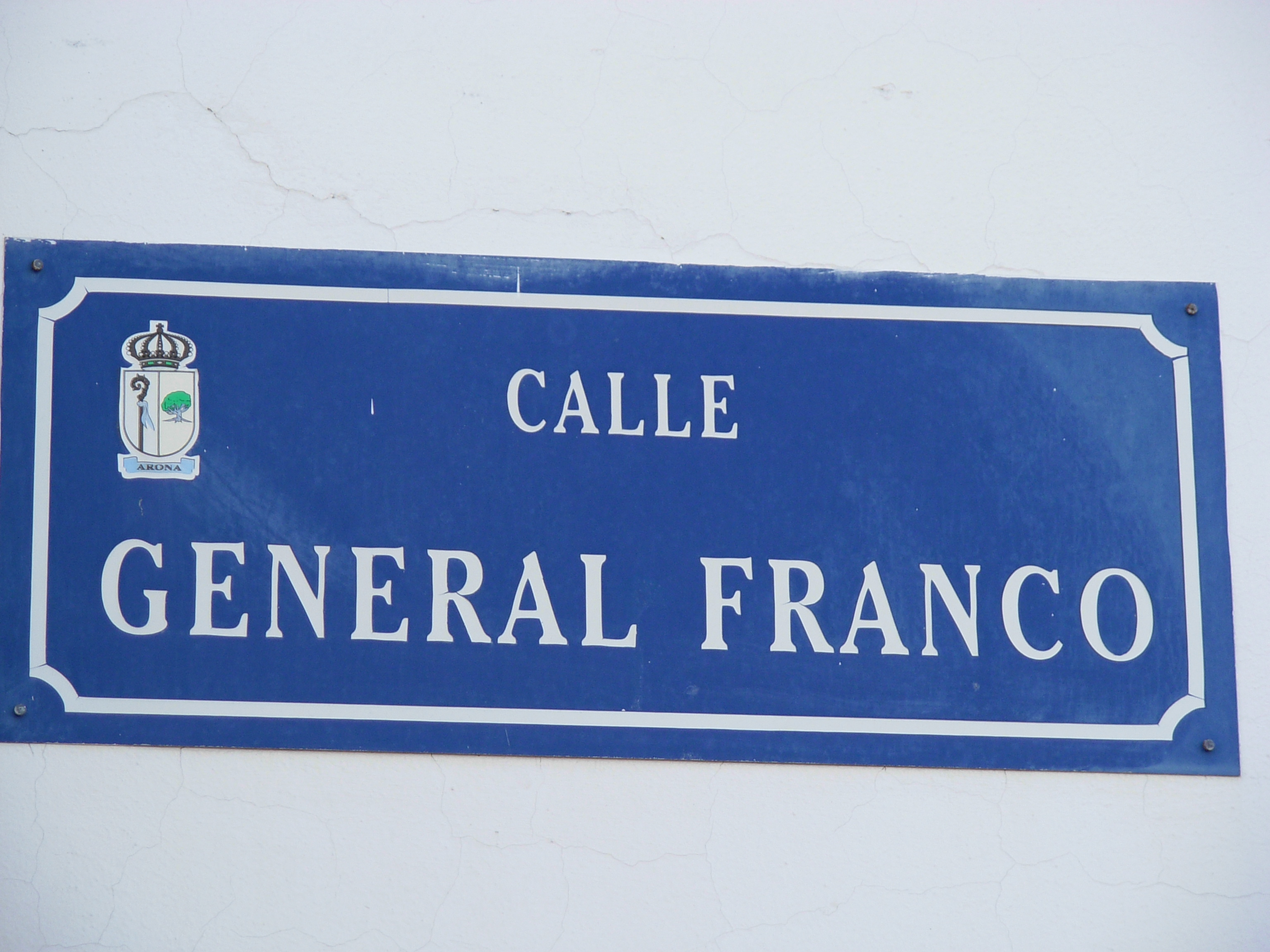
A street named after Franco in Los Cristianos on Tenerife, March 2007

Francoist era

The Francoist period (1936–1975) remains controversial in 21st-century Spain. The National–Catholic regime has left its mark in many street and square namings, which some Spaniards seek to preserve, while others make efforts to erase them. On 31 October 2007, the socialist Zapatero I government introduced the Historical Memory Law, which removed all names of General Francisco Franco himself, but left those of his henchmen and his symbols intact. Arguing that this legislation had not gone far enough, Madrilene mayor Manuela Carmena announced in June 2016 that 30 names of Franco's associates and associations would also be removed from the capital's streets and squares.

=== Ukraine ===
Russian invasion of Ukraine

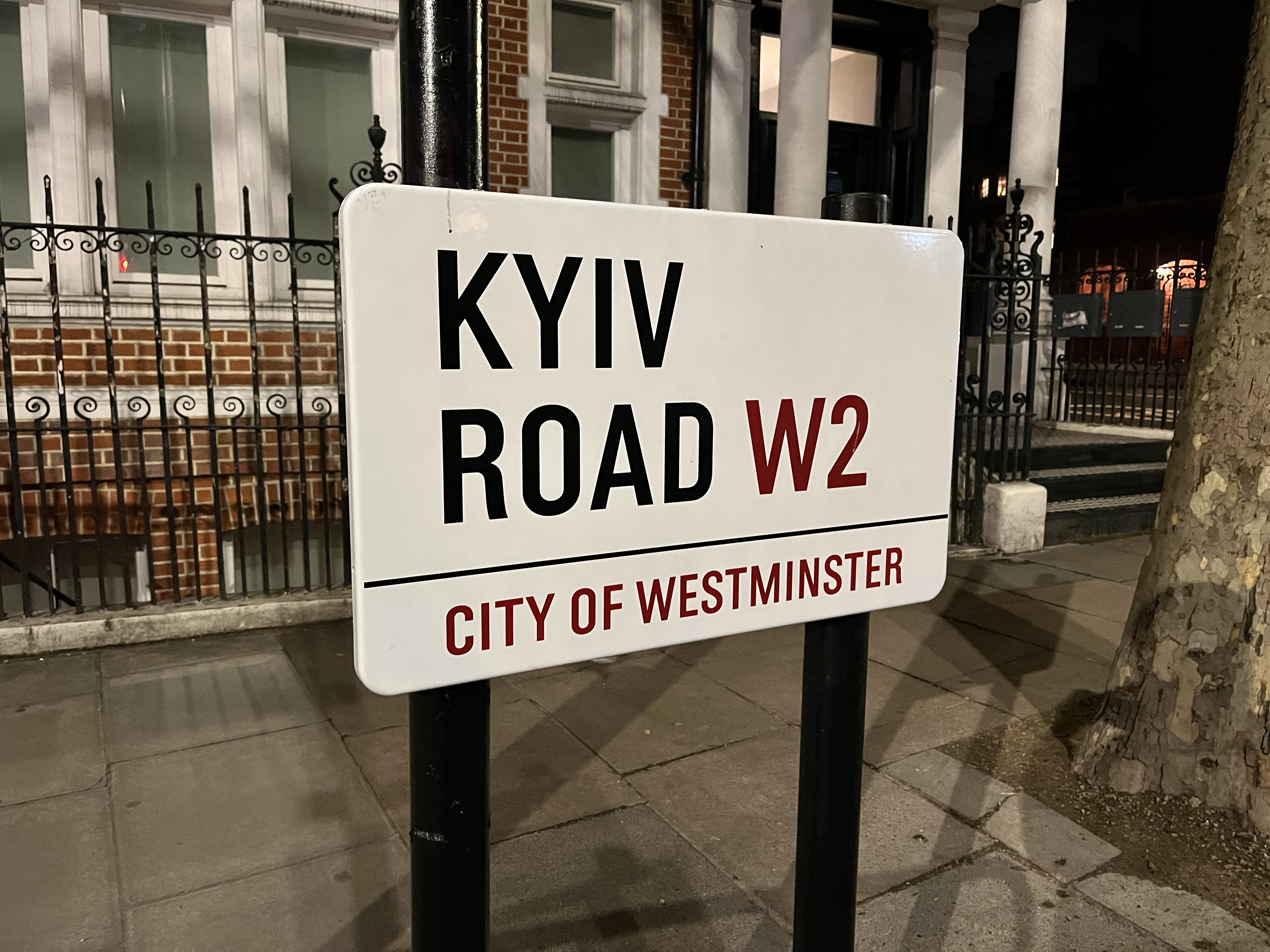
A 'Kyiv Road' road sign positioned opposite the Embassy of Russia, London

Following the Russian invasion of Ukraine in 2022, the One Philosophy consulting group together with the Ukrainian Ministry of Foreign Affairs launched a campaign called "Ukraine Street", which calls on nations to change the name of the streets where Russian embassies or consulates are located. Ukrainian foreign minister Dmytro Kuleba called the campaign part of an effort to "isolate Russia and de-Putinize the world." In addition, Ukraine has been conducting a campaign of derussification, removing addresses associated with Russian and Soviet history, and replacing them with names associated with Ukrainian history. The most streets were renamed in Zaporizhzhia Oblast (1.011), Vinnytsia Oblast (912), Odesa Oblast (581) and Kharkiv Oblast (656). While in Ternopil Oblast (22), Lviv Oblast (12) and Ivano-Frankivsk Oblast (3).

=== United Kingdom ===
Andrew Mountbatten-Windsor's relationship with Jeffrey Epstein

In the United Kingdom there is debate around the naming of several roads after Andrew Mountbatten-Windsor, once the Duke of York, a title currently as of 2026 extant, following his 2019 announcement that he was to step back from public duties, and later stripping of titles by the King, Charles III in relation to Andrew's relationship with convicted paedophile Jeffrey Epstein.

== See also ==
- Arabisation
- Cancel culture
- Decolonisation
- Decommunisation
- Denazification
- De-Stalinisation
- Geographical renaming
- Language policy
- List of monuments and memorials removed during the George Floyd protests
- List of street names changed around diplomatic mission buildings for political reasons
- List of politically motivated renamings
- List of streets named after Martin Luther King Jr.
- Macedonia naming dispute
- Memory laws
- Removal of Confederate monuments and memorials
- Street sign theft
- Tito street decision in Slovenia
- Vergangenheitsbewältigung
