= Ukraine Square, Oslo =

Square in Oslo, Norway

Coordinates: 59°54′46.930″N 10°42′22.150″E

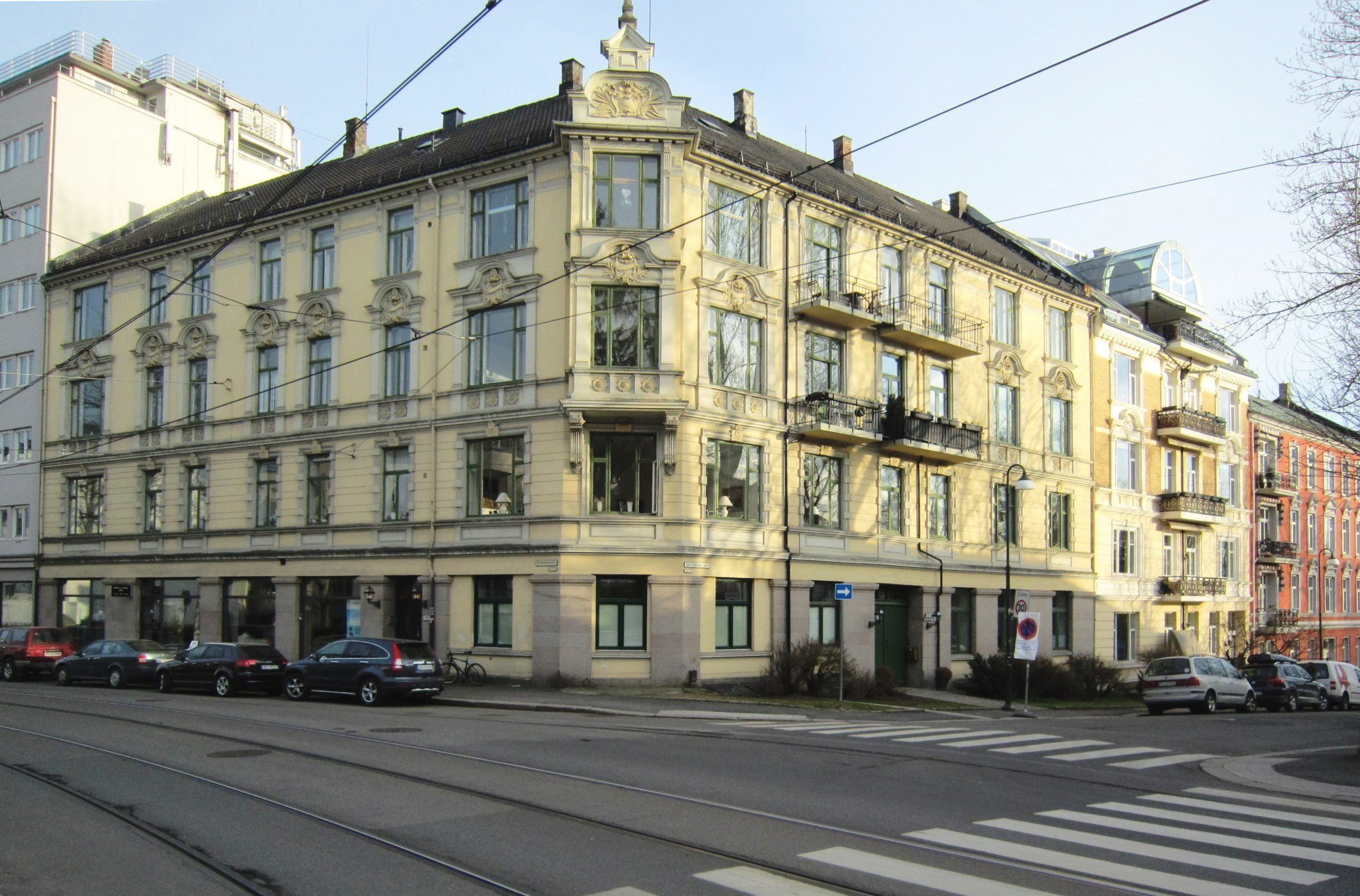
Ukraine Square in Oslo

Ukraine Square (Norwegian: Ukrainas plass) is a square in Skarpsno, Frogner, Oslo, Norway. It is located at the intersection of Drammensveien and Leiv Eirikssons gate. The Russian Embassy is located next to Ukraine Square. The borough of Frogner renamed the square as Ukraine Square on 8 March 2022 in support of Ukraine's freedom, in response to the Russian invasion of Ukraine. The borough voted on 8 March 2022 to change the name of part of the road where the Russian embassy and other properties have its addresses; none of the addresses were changed, however the intersection closest to the Russian embassy got its name "Ukraine Square".

== See also ==
- List of streets renamed due to the 2022 Russian invasion of Ukraine
