= Decommunization =

Purging an area of communism

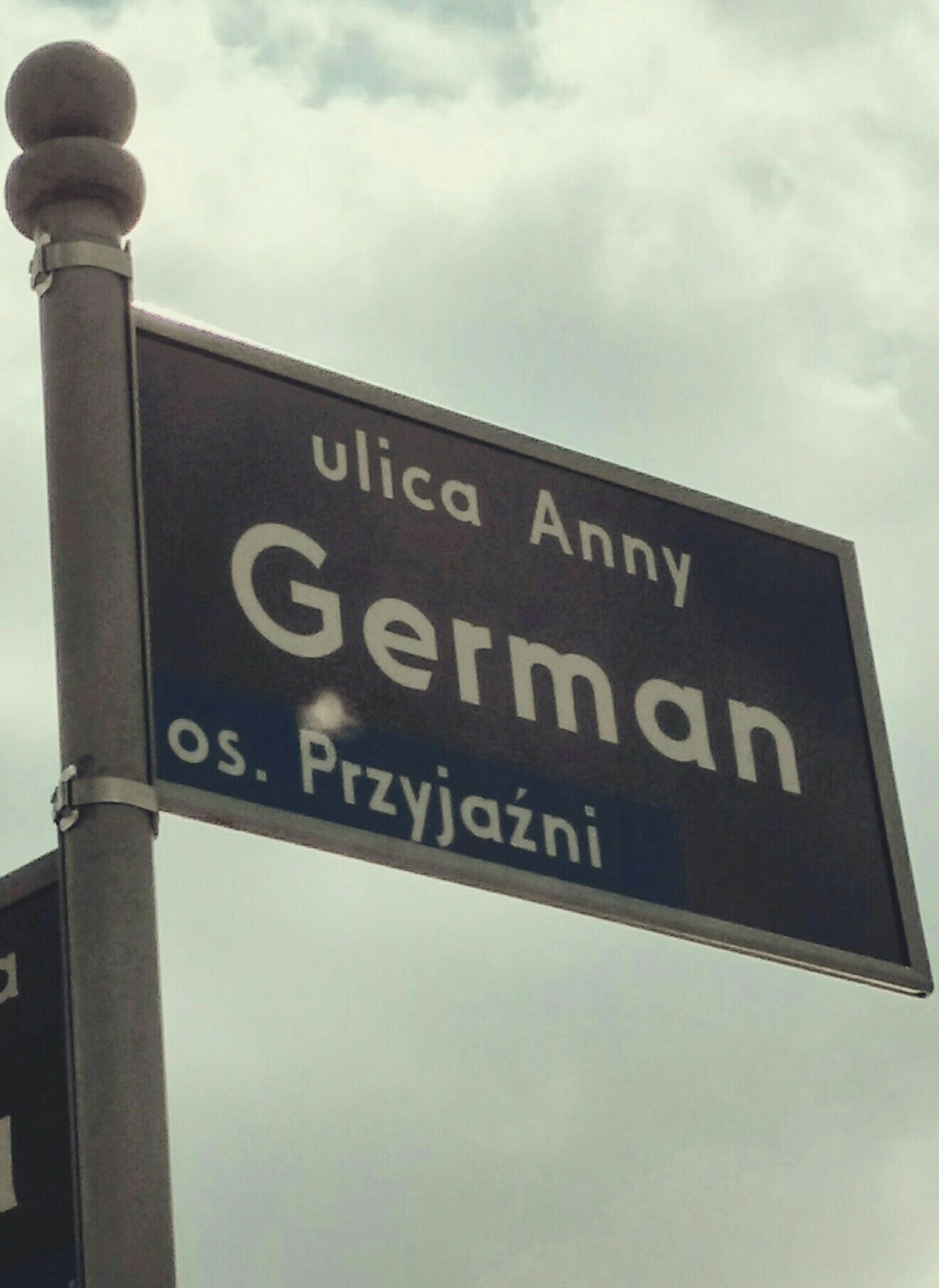
One of the manifestations of decommunization has been renaming streets. Before 2017, ulica Anny German in Poznań (Anna German Street) was named in honor of Julian Leński.

Decommunization in former communist states is the process of purging former communist high officials and eliminating communist symbols.

It is sometimes referred to as political cleansing. Although the term has been occasionally used during the Cold War, it is most commonly applied to the former countries of the Eastern Bloc, those countries that were considered being close to the Eastern Bloc and the Soviet Union to describe a number of legal and social changes during their periods of postcommunism during the post–Cold War era.

In some states, decommunization includes bans on communist symbols. While sharing common traits, the processes of decommunization have run differently in different states.

== Responsible institutions ==
- Bulgaria - The Institute for Study of Communist Crimes in Bulgaria
- Czechia – The Office of the Documentation and the Investigation of the Crimes of Communism
- Estonia – The Estonian International Commission for Investigation of Crimes Against Humanity
- Hungary – The Committee of National Remembrance
- Latvia – The Centre for the Documentation of the Consequences of Totalitarianism (TSDC)
- Lithuania – The Lithuanian Center for the Research of Genocide and Resistance
- Moldova – The Commission for the Study of the Communist Dictatorship in Moldova
- Poland – The Institute of National Remembrance — Commission for the Prosecution of Crimes against the Polish Nation
- Romania – The Institute for the Investigation of Communist Crimes in Romania
- Slovakia – The Institute of National Memory – Ústav pamäti národa (Sk)
- Ukraine – The Ukrainian Institute of National Remembrance

== Purging and prosecution of former communist officials ==
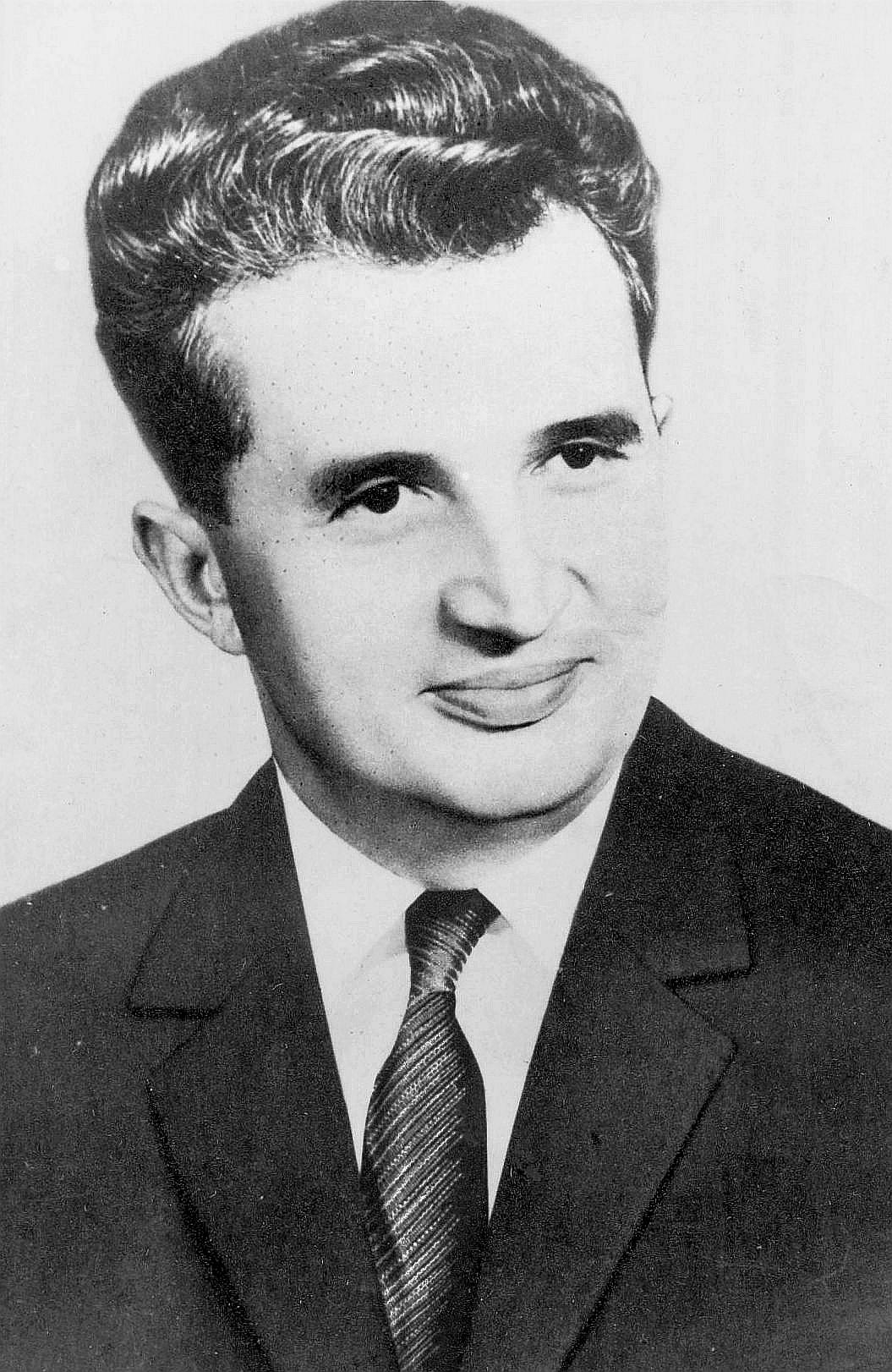
Romanian communist leader Nicolae Ceaușescu and his wife Elena were executed by firing squad for various atrocities

Decommunization came to refer to government policies of limiting the participation of former communist officials in politics. This should not be confused with lustration which is the procedure of scrutinizing holders or candidates for public offices in terms being former informants of the communist secret police.

According to a 1992 constitutional amendment in the Czech Republic, a person who publicly denies, puts in doubt, approves, or tries to justify Nazi or Communist genocide or other crimes of Nazis or Communists will be punished with a prison term of six months to three years. In 1992, Barbara Harff wrote that no Communist country or governing body had been convicted of genocide.

In August 2007, Arnold Meri, an Estonian Red Army veteran and cousin of former Estonian president Lennart Meri, faced charges of genocide by Estonian authorities for participating in the deportations of Estonians in Hiiumaa during 1949. Meri denied the accusation, characterizing them as politically motivated defamation, stating: "I do not consider myself guilty of genocide." The trial was halted when Meri died on 27 March 2009 at the age of 89.

=== State leaders ===
- Bulgaria – Todor Zhivkov was initially sentenced to seven years in prison, but transferred to house arrest for health reasons. He was later declared innocent by the Supreme Court of Bulgaria in 1996 and was released from house arrest shortly thereafter. He died as a free man one year later.
- Cambodia – Kang Kek Iew, Nuon Chea, and Khieu Samphan are Khmer Rouge leaders convicted by the UN-backed Khmer Rouge Tribunal.
- East Germany – Erich Honecker was arrested, but soon released and the proceedings against him were abandoned due to his ill health. He died in 1994. Several other members of the former East German government, such as Egon Krenz, were nonetheless convicted.
- Ethiopia – Mengistu Haile Mariam was sentenced to death but later commuted to life imprisonment after being found guilty in absentia.
- Poland – Wojciech Jaruzelski avoided most court appearances, citing poor health, and was never convicted. He died as a free man in 2014 and was buried with full military honors at the Powązki Military Cemetery, attended by the incumbent president of Poland, as well as two former presidents.
- Romania – Nicolae Ceaușescu and his wife, Elena Ceaușescu were sentenced to death and executed by firing squad.

== Elimination of communist symbols ==
=== Armenia ===
In 1991, the Lenin monument was removed from Republic Square in Yerevan, after he was beheaded. The pedestal of the monument remained standing until 1996.

=== Bulgaria ===
In December 2023, the Monument to the Soviet Army in downtown Sofia was partially dismantled and set to be put in the Museum of Socialist Art. As of March 2024, it has yet to be put in the museum or replaced with a new monument.

=== Czech Republic ===
In April 2020, a statue of Soviet Marshal Ivan Konev was removed from Prague, which prompted criminal investigation by Russian authorities who considered it an insult. The Mayor of Prague's sixth municipal district, Ondřej Kolář, announced on Prima televize that he would be under police protection after a Russian man made attempts on his life. Prime Minister Andrej Babiš condemned that as foreign interference, while Kremlin Press Secretary Dmitry Peskov dismissed allegations of Russian involvement as "another hoax".

=== Finland ===
Since the collapse of the USSR there was active debate regarding the fate of the Soviet symbols that were received as gifts. For example, the World peace sculpture, gifted to Finland by the USSR in 1990, has been vandalized several times during its existence. Since Russia attacked Ukraine in 2022 the discussion of removing these symbols started to intensify. Statues of Lenin were removed from Turku and Kotka supposedly as "a gesture of solidarity" for Ukraine. The World Peace sculpture was also removed from Helsinki (the official reason was that it needed to be relocated due to roadworks). The name of Lenin Park will be changed in the future. Critics have considered the latest moves as harmful since history will be erased by these actions. It can also be asked if the erasure can be logically argued as Lenin and Putin are representing different ideologies. There has been some criticism from the political right-wing regarding the history of the elderly Social Democrats who some accuse of spying for the Stasi. The so-called Tiitinen list has been discussed and the right-wing has demanded it be declassified.

=== Kyrgyzstan ===
On 7 June 2025, Kyrgyz authorities took down a statue of Lenin in the second largest city of Osh, which is also the tallest Lenin statue in Central Asia.

=== Poland ===
Since 1989, Poland has taken down hundreds of Soviet monuments due to the negative reputation the Soviet Union has in Poland. Although some Poles see the memorials as justified in honouring those who died fighting against Nazi Germany, others seek the removal of Soviet memorials because of the decades of totalitarianism that resulted from Soviet occupation, and also because of the 1939 German-Soviet pact and the Katyn massacre. Historian Łukasz Kamiński of the Institute of National Remembrance said, "Memorials in city centers and villages can send the wrong historical signal... What do you think we got, when the Soviets liberated Poland from Hitler, if not a new yoke?"

In the 2010s, Poland continued to demolish remaining Soviet monuments, some of which have been relocated to museums. The removals have attracted criticism from Russian Foreign Minister Sergey Lavrov, who has lashed out at Warsaw officials for opposing the monuments, as has Maria Zakharova, a spokesperson for the Russian foreign ministry.

=== Ukraine ===
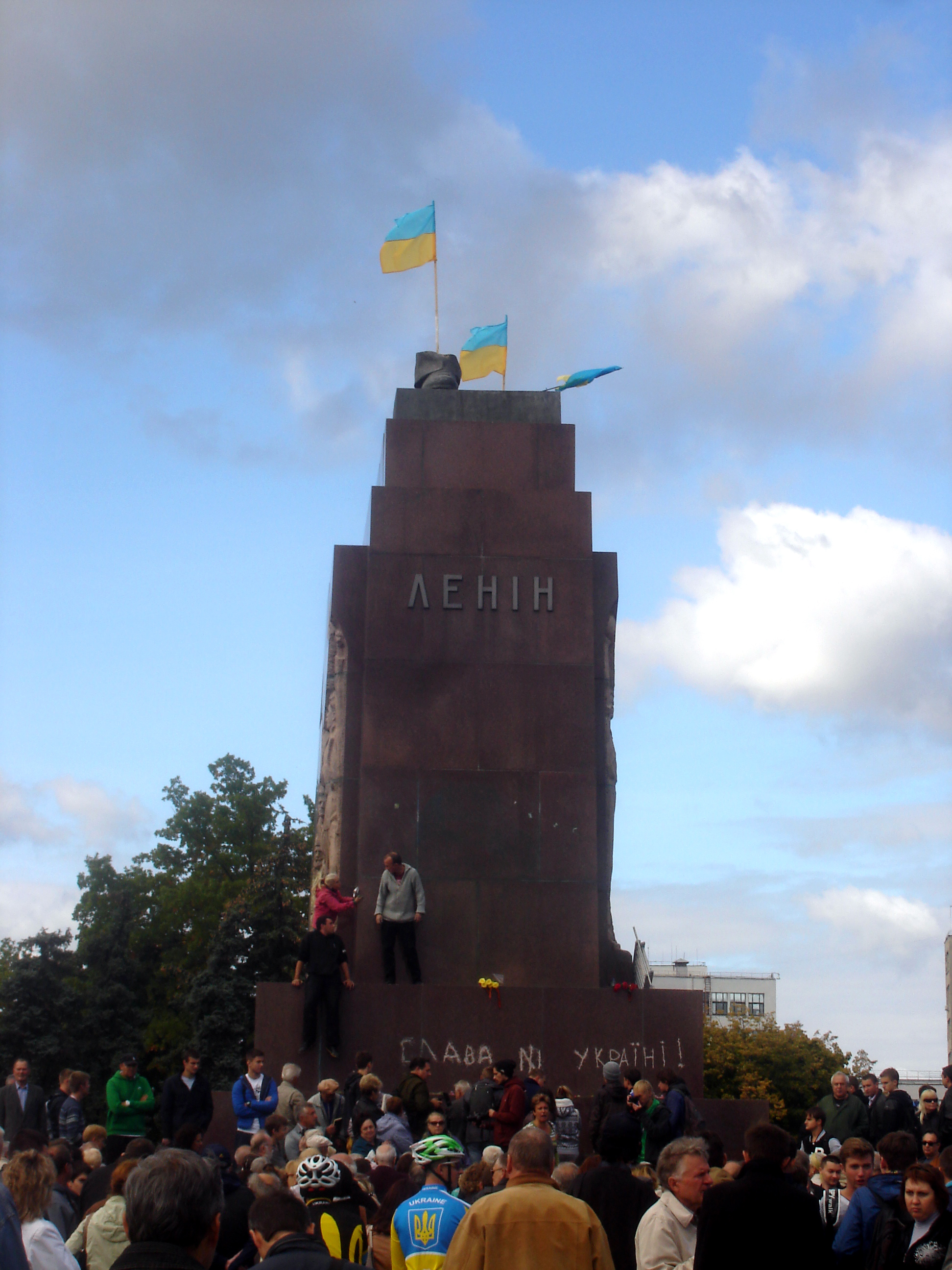
The plinth of the Statue of Lenin in Kharkiv after its destruction

The process of decommunization and de-sovietization in Ukraine started soon after dissolution of the Soviet Union in the early 1990s, led by President Leonid Kravchuk, a former high-ranking party official. In April 2015, a formal decommunization process started in Ukraine after laws were approved which outlawed communist symbols, among other things. On 15 May 2015, President Petro Poroshenko signed a set of laws that started a six-month period for the removal of communist monuments (excluding World War II monuments) and renaming of public places named after communist-related themes. At the time, this meant that 22 cities and 44 villages would need to be renamed. In 2016, 51,493 streets and 987 cities and villages were renamed, and 1,320 Lenin monuments and 1,069 monuments to other communist figures were removed.

== Results ==
Communist parties outside of Poland, Ukraine and the Baltic states were not outlawed and their members were not prosecuted. Just a few places attempted to exclude even members of communist secret services from decision-making. In a number of countries, the communist party simply changed its name and continued to function.

Stephen Holmes of the University of Chicago argued in 1996 that after a period of active decommunization, it was met with a near-universal failure. After the introduction of lustration, demand for scapegoats has become relatively low, and former communists have been elected for high governmental and other administrative positions. Holmes notes that the only real exception was former East Germany, where thousands of former Stasi informers have been fired from public positions.

Holmes suggests the following reasons for the turnoff of decommunization:

- After 45–70 years of Communist state rule, nearly every family has members associated with the state. After the initial desire "to root out the reds" came a realization that massive punishment is wrong and finding only some guilty is hardly justice.
- The urgency of the current economic problems of postcommunism makes the crimes of the communist past "old news" for many citizens.
- Decommunization is believed to be a power game of elites.
- The difficulty of dislodging the social elite makes it require a totalitarian state to disenfranchise the "enemies of the people" quickly and efficiently and a desire for normalcy overcomes the desire for punitive justice.
- Very few people have a perfectly clean slate and so are available to fill the positions that require significant expertise.

== Similar concepts ==
Decommunization has been compared to denazification in post-World War II Europe, and the de-Ba'athification in post-Saddam Hussein Iraq.

== See also ==
- Anti-communism
- Bans on communist symbols
- Communist crimes in Polish legal system
- Lustration in Poland
- Decommunization in Ukraine
- Demolition of monuments to Vladimir Lenin in Ukraine
- Derussification
- Decommunization in Russia
- Denazification
- De-Leninization
- De-Stalinization
- De-Ba'athification
- De-Sinicization
- De-Sukarnoization
- Communist nostalgia
- Nostalgia for the Soviet Union
- Ostalgie
- Estonian International Commission for Investigation of Crimes Against Humanity
- Proclamation of Timișoara
- Golaniad
- Street name controversy
- Vergangenheitsbewältigung
