= List of street names changed around diplomatic mission buildings for political reasons =

This list details situations in which a government hosting a foreign diplomatic mission building (such as an embassy or consulate) has deliberately changed the name of the street adjoining said building (often thereby making the name part of the official street address of the building) with the intent of sending a political message to the foreign government.

- Albania:
  - The street where the Russian, Ukrainian, Serbian, and Kosovan embassies are was renamed to Free Ukraine Street (Rruga Ukraina e Lirë) in Tirana on March 7, 2022, reacting to Russia's invasion of Ukraine.
- Bangladesh:
  - In December 2025, the Dhaka North City Corporation officially renamed the road stretching from Gulshan-2 to Pragati Sarani—which runs adjacent to the High Commission of India, Dhaka—as "Felani Avenue" in memory of Felani Khatun, a 15-year-old Bangladeshi girl shot dead by India's Border Security Force (BSF) in 2011.
- Czechia:
  - In February 2020, the square in front of the Russian Embassy in Prague was renamed “Boris Nemtsov Square” (náměstí Borise Němcova) after a critic of the Russian government who was murdered in 2015. After the renaming, the embassy switched to using a post address referring to another entrance to the building.
  - In April 2022, a part of the street used by the Russian Embassy in Prague was renamed “Heroes of Ukraine street” (Ukrajinských hrdinů), reacting to Russia's invasion of Ukraine. The previously unnamed bridge over a railway was named “Skakun Bridge” (Skakunův most) after Vitalii Skakun.
- India:
  - The street near the United States consulate in Kolkata was renamed Ho Chi Minh Sarani during the Vietnam War due to support of North Vietnam and opposition to the war.
- Iran:
  - In 1981, Churchill Avenue adjoining the British Embassy in Tehran was changed to Bobby Sands Avenue to commemorate an Irish freedom fighter and a member of the Provisional Irish Republican Army who was elected as a member of the British parliament in a protest vote and subsequently died from a hunger strike in 1981 while incarcerated.
- Latvia:
  - With Russia's invasion of Ukraine, on March 10, 2022, Riga City Council renamed a section of Antonijas iela, where the Russian embassy is located, to "Ukrainian Independence Street".
- Lithuania:
  - The previously unnamed dead-end road where the Russian embassy in Vilnius is located was named "Heroes of Ukraine street" in early March 2022 reacting to Russia's invasion of Ukraine.
- Norway:
  - The borough of Frogner in Oslo voted on March 8, 2022, to change the formal address of the Russian embassy to "Ukraine Square", in response to the 2022 Russian invasion of Ukraine.
- Russia:
  - In 2022, the unnamed territory in front of the US Embassy was named after Donetsk People's Republic, the geographical coordinates are used by the institution instead now. The same happened to the territory in front of the UK Embassy, which was named after Luhansk People's Republic; the embassy refused to use the new address.
- Saudi Arabia:
  - In 1948, US-Saudi diplomatic relations began when the US’ first diplomatic mission in Saudi Arabia was located in a traditional house in Jeddah. In response to the US' support to Israel in the Arab-Israeli conflict, the street was named Falastin Street (شارع فلسطين) in support of Palestine.
- Turkey:
  - In 2018, the Ankara Metropolitan Municipality Council twice changed the street address of the location of the new United States Embassy building, first to Olive Branch Street in February, then to Malcolm X Avenue in October.
- United Kingdom:
  - In 1986, the local Glasgow government changed the name of the street adjoining the South African consulate to Nelson Mandela Place in recognition of the anti-apartheid activist who was at the time imprisoned by the South African government.
  - In February 2023, Westminster City Council decided to mark the first anniversary of Russia's invasion of Ukraine by renaming a section of Bayswater Road to Kyiv Road; the section is a short distance from the embassy of Russia.
- United States:
  - During the 1980s, the block of 16th Street NW between L and M streets, in front of the embassy of the Soviet Union in Washington, D.C. was renamed "Andrei Sakharov Plaza" as a form of protest against Sakharov's 1980 arrest and detention.
  - In 2018, the Washington D.C. City Council renamed the street housing the Russian Embassy as Boris Nemtsov Street after a critic of the Russian government who was murdered in 2015.
  - In 2021, the Washington, D.C. City Council renamed the street outside the Saudi embassy after slain Washington Post journalist Jamal Khashoggi.
  - In 2024, senators Bill Cassidy and Dick Durbin proposed renaming the street near the Russian Ambassador to the United States residence as Alexei Navalny Way after the Russian opposition leader died in a penal colony in February.

== See also ==
- List of streets renamed due to the 2022 Russian invasion of Ukraine
