= Embassy of Russia, Oslo =

Embassy of Russia in Oslo Посольство Российской Федерации в Осло Russlands ambassade i Oslo
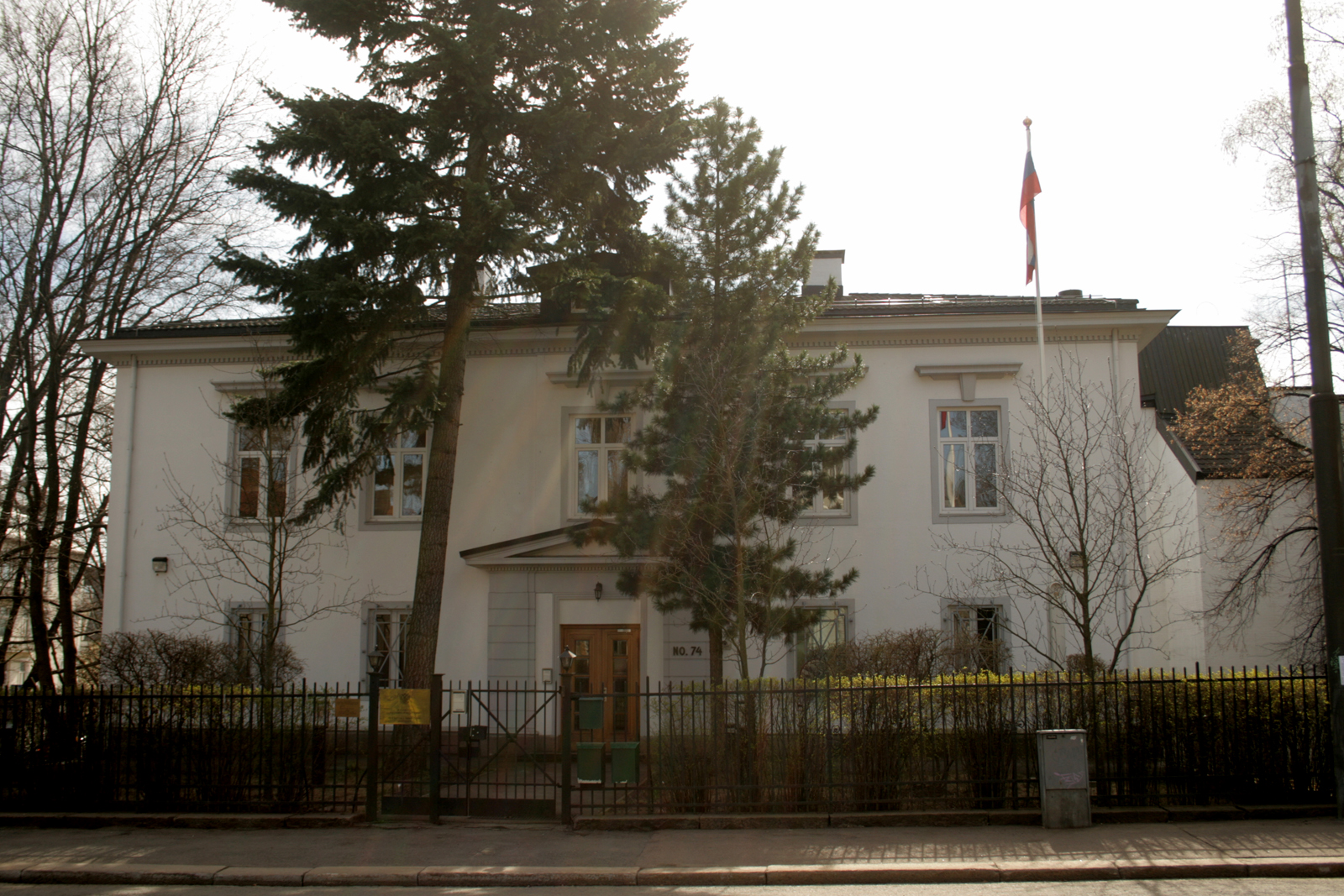
- Location: Skarpsno, Oslo
- Address: Drammensveien 74 (next to Ukraine Square)
- Coordinates: 59°54′46.38″N 10°42′19.42″E
- Ambassador: Sergey Vadimovich Andreyev

The Embassy of Russia in Oslo is the diplomatic mission of Russia to Norway. The embassy is located next to Ukraine Square at Skarpsno. The square outside the embassy was renamed Ukraine Square by the city on 7 March 2022 in support of Ukraine's freedom, in response to the 2022 Russian invasion of Ukraine. The borough voted on 8 March 2022 to change the formal address of the Russian embassy to Ukraine Square.

== History ==
The oldest building on the lot is a house built in 1867 for Colonel F.P.L. Næser by architect Wilhelm von Hanno. From 1926, the house was the residence of German minister Edmund Rohmberg, and later by Curt Bräuer. The building closest to Drammensveien, was built by the Germans in 1926, and drawn by Oscar Hoff. After the conclusion of World War II, the building was seized by the Norwegian government and made available for the Soviet Union.

== The embassy building ==
The complex of buildings of the Russian Embassy is located at Ukraine Square on an area of 11.5 hectares and since 1946, it is on an indefinite rent.

Since 1924, started the history of the complex of buildings of the diplomatic mission of Russia in Norway, when diplomatic relations were established between the USSR and Norway. It was the time when the premises located in a house on 22A, Incognitogata Street, were allocated to the needs of the USSR Embassy.

In June 1940, Norway was occupied by fascist Germany and diplomatic relations with the USSR were interrupted.

After the end of the World War II in 1946, the diplomatic relations at the embassy level were restored and two buildings along Drammensween Street 74 were allocated for the premises of the USSR Embassy. Before that, the diplomatic representation of Germany was located in these buildings for 20 years.

One of the buildings, a mansion with an area of 900 m^{2}, was designed in the middle of the 19th century by the famous German architect Wilhelm von Hanno, commissioned by the State General and Marshal of the royal court Frederic Neser. In 1885, the house was bought by Norwegian W. E. Kier, one of the five sons of a wealthy timber merchant H. Kiera, and was inherited for 40 years. The interior of the building, despite a series of rearrangements, was largely preserved in its original form. Currently, the Embassy's protocol events are held in this building.

== See also ==
- Norway–Russia relations
- List of ambassadors of Russia to Norway

== Notes ==
- Steen, Willum (1998). "Ambassadestrøket par excellence". In Heiberg, Kirsten (ed.). Skarpsno : Fra løkke til fasjonabelt strøk. Oslo: Skarpsno vel. p. 128.
