= Vergangenheitsbewältigung =

Societal activities for coping with the past

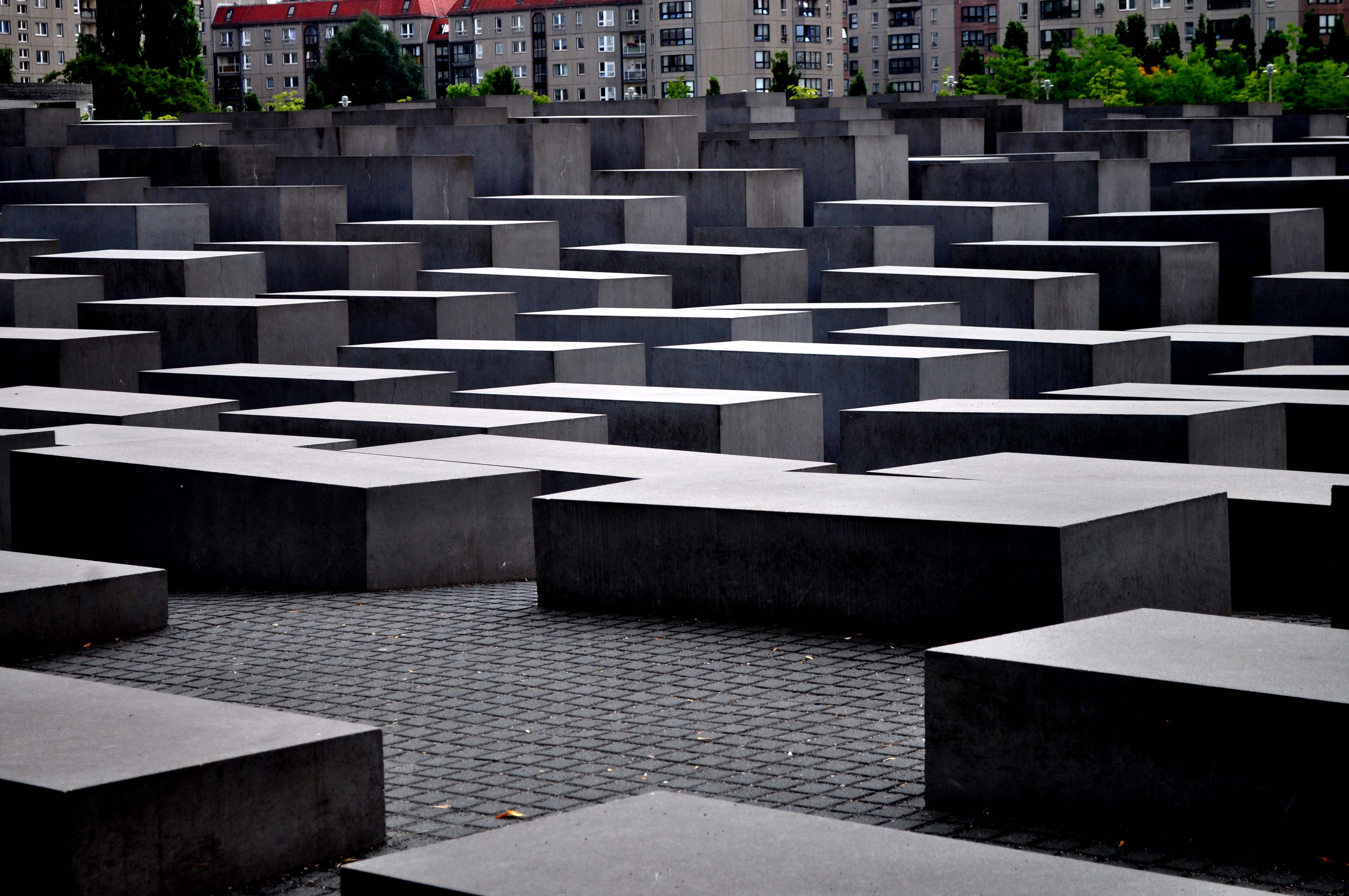
Memorial to the Murdered Jews of Europe in Berlin, Germany

Vergangenheitsbewältigung (Note: A compound noun of die Vergangenheit, 'the past', and Bewältigung, 'the overcoming of problems', often used in psychological contexts for coming to terms with repressed and incriminating mental injuries and guilt.) (German: [fɛɐ̯ˈɡaŋənhaɪtsbəˌvɛltɪɡʊŋ], transl. "struggle of overcoming the past" or "work of coping with the past") is a German compound noun describing the moral and political effort to confront the crimes of the past. Since the late 20th century, this concept has played a central role in examining how post-1945 German literature, society and culture reflect on Nazism as a moral catastrophe, citing in particular its perpetration of genocide. In Germany, the term arose from a profound reckoning with the atrocities of the Holocaust and the Porajmos, the war crimes of the Wehrmacht, and the ideological terror inflicted in the name of the German people. Vergangenheitsbewältigung thus represents not just historical reflection but a rejection of Nazi ideology and an effort to build a future grounded in peace and accountability.

Following the reunification of 1990 and the subsequent fall of the Soviet Union in 1991, the scope of Vergangenheitsbewältigung broadened to include critical engagement with the socialist legacy of the former German Democratic Republic (GDR). While anti-communist narratives often overshadow this period, many historians and citizens, especially those born in East Germany and their descendents, continue to assert the GDR's contributions to antifascist memory and social equity. Unlike West Germany, the GDR officially promoted antifascism and identified Nazism as the chief enemy of the working class. In this context, Vergangenheitsbewältigung may involve not only coming to terms with state surveillance or authoritarian excesses in the GDR, but also defending its historical efforts to resist Nazism.

== Historical development ==
Vergangenheitsbewältigung describes the attempt to analyze, digest and learn to live with the past, in particular the Holocaust. The focus on learning is much in the spirit of philosopher George Santayana's oft-quoted observation that "those who forget the past are condemned to repeat it". It is a technical term also used in English that was coined after 1945 in West Germany, relating specifically to the atrocities committed in Nazi Germany, and to both historical and contemporary concerns about the extensive degree to which Nazism compromised and co-opted many German cultural, religious, and political institutions. The term therefore deals at once with the concrete responsibility of the German state (West Germany assumed the legal obligations of the Reich) and of individual Germans for what took place "under Hitler", and with questions about the roots of legitimacy in a society whose development of the Enlightenment collapsed in the face of Nazi ideology.

=== After denazification ===
Historically, Vergangenheitsbewältigung often is seen as the logical "next step" after a denazification drive under both the Allied Occupation and by the Christian Democratic Union government of Konrad Adenauer, and began in the late 1950s and early 1960s, roughly the period in which the work of the Wiederaufbau ('reconstruction') became less absorbing and urgent. Having replaced the institutions and power structures of Nazism, the aim of liberal Germans was to deal with the guilt of recent history. Vergangenheitsbewältigung is marked by learning from the past in ways such as honestly admitting that such a past did indeed exist, attempting to remedy as far as possible the wrongs committed, and attempting to move on from that past.

=== Religion and education ===
The German churches, of which only a minority played a significant role in the resistance to Nazism, have led the way in this process. They have notably developed a unique German postwar theology of repentance. At the regular mass church rallies, the Lutheran Kirchentag and the Catholic Katholikentag, for example, have developed this theme as a leitmotiv of Christian youth.

Vergangenheitsbewältigung has been expressed by the society through its schools, where in most German states the centrally-written curriculum provides each child with repeated lessons on different aspects of Nazism in German history, politics and religion classes from the fifth grade onwards, related to their maturity. Associated school trips may have destinations of concentration camps. Jewish Holocaust survivors are often invited to schools as guest speakers, though the passage of time limits these opportunities as their generation has aged.

=== Philosophy ===
In philosophy, Theodor Adorno's writings include the lecture "Was bedeutet: Aufarbeitung der Vergangenheit?" ('what is meant by: working through the past?'), a subject related to his thinking of "after Auschwitz" in his later work. He delivered the lecture on 9 November 1959 at a conference on education held in Wiesbaden. Writing in the context of a new wave of antisemitic attacks against synagogues and Jewish community institutions occurring in West Germany at that time, Adorno rejected the contemporary catch phrase "working through the past" as misleading. He argued that it masked a denial, rather than signifying the kind of critical self-reflection that Freudian theory called for in order to "come to terms" with the past.

According to Johannes Schulz, Adorno did not reject the concept of Vergangenheitsbewältigung completely, but rather advocated for an alternative, materialist conception of it, which sought to uncover:

the ways in which the structural causes of past moral catastrophe have endured into the present. It rejects idealist calls for reconciliation with the past and present and aims at the negative goal of preventing future moral catastrophe through changing tainted social structures.

Jürgen Habermas later elaborated upon Adorno's conception of "moral catastrophe" as essential to a productive effort to come to terms with the past, arguing that "only through the shock of the moral catastrophe" of the Holocaust had democratic values truly "taken root in the motives and hearts of the citizens" of Germany.

=== Culture ===
In the cultural sphere, the term Vergangenheitsbewältigung is associated with a movement in German literature whose notable authors include Günter Grass and Siegfried Lenz. Lenz's novel Deutschstunde and Grass's Danziger Trilogie both deal with childhoods under Nazism.

The erection of public monuments to Holocaust victims has been a tangible commemoration of Germany's Vergangenheitsbewältigung. Concentration camps, such as Dachau, Buchenwald, Bergen-Belsen and Flossenbürg, are open to visitors as memorials and museums. Most towns have plaques on walls marking the spots where particular atrocities took place.

When the seat of government was moved from Bonn to Berlin in 1999, an extensive "Holocaust memorial", designed by architect Peter Eisenman, was planned as part of the extensive development of new official buildings in the district of Berlin-Mitte; it was opened on 10 May 2005. The informal name of this memorial, the Holocaust-Mahnmal, is significant. It does not translate easily: 'Holocaust Cenotaph' would be one sense, but the noun Mahnmal, which is distinct from the term Denkmal (typically used to translate 'memorial') carries the sense of 'admonition', 'urging', 'appeal', or 'warning', rather than 'remembrance' as such. The work is formally known as Das Denkmal für die ermordeten Juden Europas (transl. The Memorial for the Murdered Jews of Europe). Some controversy attaches to it precisely because of this formal name and its exclusive emphasis on Jewish victims. As Eisenman acknowledged at the opening ceremony,

It is clear that we won't have solved all the problems – architecture is not a panacea for evil – nor will we have satisfied all those present today, but this cannot have been our intention.

== Actions of other European countries ==
In Austria, ongoing arguments about the nature and significance of the Anschluss, and unresolved disputes about legal expressions of obligation and liability, have led to very different concerns, and to a far less institutionalized response by the government. Since the late 20th century, observers and analysts have expressed concerns about the ascent of "Haiderism". (Note: Haider's growing popularity was protested by many Austrians as proto- or neo-fascism after electoral successes in the Austrian legislative election of 1999 and his entry into coalition government with the Austrian People's Party.)

Poland has maintained a museum, archive, and research institute at Oświęcim (German: Auschwitz) ever since a 2 July 1947 act of the Polish Parliament. In the same year, Czechoslovakia established what was known as the 'National Suffering Memorial' and later as the Terezín memorial in Terezín, Czech Republic. This site during the Holocaust was known as the concentration camp of Theresienstadt. In the context of varying degrees of Communist orthodoxy in both countries during the period of Soviet domination of Eastern Europe through much of the late 20th century, historical research into the Holocaust was politicized to varying degrees. Marxist doctrines of class struggle were often overlaid onto generally received histories, which tended to exclude both acts of collaboration and antisemitism in these nations.

The advance of the Einsatzgruppen, Aktion Reinhardt, and many other significant events in the Holocaust occurred in German-occupied Europe, outside the present-day borders of the Federal Republic of Germany. The history of the memorials and archives which have been erected at these sites in eastern Europe is associated with the Communist regimes that ruled these areas for more than four decades after World War II. The Nazis promoted an idea of an expansive German nation extending into territories where ethnic Germans had previously settled. They invaded and controlled much of Central and Eastern Europe, unleashing violence against various Slavic groups, as well as Jews, Communists, prisoners of war, etc. After the war, the eastern European nations expelled German settlers as well as long settled ethnic Germans (the Volksdeutsche) as a reaction to Nazi Germany's attempt to claim the eastern lands on behalf of ethnic Germans.

== Analogous processes elsewhere ==
In some of its aspects, Vergangenheitsbewältigung can be compared to the attempts of other democratic countries to raise consciousness and come to terms with earlier periods of governmental and insurgency abuses, such as the South African Truth and Reconciliation Commission, which investigated human rights abuses by both the National Party Government in South Africa under apartheid and by senior members of the African National Congress including Winnie Mandela and by the ANC's paramilitary wing, Umkhonto we Sizwe.

Comparisons have been made with the Soviet process of glasnost and perestroika, though this was less focused on the past than achieving a level of open criticism necessary for progressive reform to take place.

It was widely assumed during this time that the Communist Party of the Soviet Union would maintain its monopoly on power. American journalist David Remnick has argued that once Memorial was founded by former Soviet dissidents in 1987 and began independently researching and publicizing accurate historical information about Soviet war crimes and the location of mass graves containing the victims of the Red Terror, Stalinism, and the Gulag; the clock began ticking on the continued survival of the Communist system.

Since the collapse of the Soviet Union, the continuing efforts in nations of eastern Europe and the independent states of the former Soviet Union to research and publicize the Communist and Stalinist past, as well as its countless human rights abuses, is sometimes referred to as a post-communist equivalent to Vergangenheitsbewältigung.

The well-documented history of Japanese war crimes, both before and during World War II is something the then-future Emperor Naruhito expressed his concerns about in February 2015, regarding how accurately such events are remembered in 21st century Japan.

== See also ==
- Functionalism versus intentionalism
- Bottom-up approach of the Holocaust
- Nazi foreign policy debate
  - Auschwitz bombing debate
- Culture of Remembrance – German: Erinnerungskultur
- Historiography of Germany
  - Historikerstreit
  - Clean Wehrmacht
  - Sonderweg
  - Stunde Null
  - Victim theory, a theory that Austria was a victim of Nazism following the Anschluss
- Street name controversy
- Transitional justice
- Transitional Justice Institute
- Truth-seeking
- Debate over the atomic bombings of Hiroshima and Nagasaki
- "I Apologize" campaign, a grassroots' initiative in Turkey
- German nationality law § Victims of Nazi persecution
- Stolpersteine, memorial-blocks placed outside the former homes of concentration camp victims
- Pact of forgetting
- War guilt question

== General references ==
- Frei, Norbert; Vergangenheitspolitik. Die Anfänge der Bundesrepublik und die NS-Vergangenheit. Munich: C.H. Beck, 1996. [In English as Adenauer's Germany and the Nazi Past: The Politics of Amnesty and Integration. New York: Columbia University Press]
- Geller, Jay Howard; Jews in Post-Holocaust Germany. Cambridge: Cambridge University Press, 2005.
- Herf, Jeffrey; Divided Memory: The Nazi Past in the Two Germanys. Cambridge: Harvard University Press, 1997.
- Maier, Charles S.; The Unmasterable Past: History, Holocaust, and German National Identity. Cambridge: Harvard University Press, 1988.
- Maislinger, Andreas; Coming to Terms with the Past: An International Comparison. In Nationalism, Ethnicity, and Identity. Cross National and Comparative Perspectives, ed. Russel F. Farnen. New Brunswick and London: Transaction Publishers, 2004.
- Moeller, Robert G.; War Stories: The Search for a Usable Past in the Federal Republic of Germany. Berkeley: University of California Press, 2001.
- Moeller, Robert G. (ed.); West Germany Under Construction: Politics, Society and Culture in the Adenauer Era. Ann Arbor: University of Michigan Press, 1997.
- Pross, Christian; Paying for the Past: The Struggle over Reparations for Surviving Victims of the Nazi Terror. Baltimore: Johns Hopkins University Press, 1998.
- Transitional Justice and Dealing with the Past", in: Berghof Glossary on Conflict Transformation. 20 notions for theory and practice. Berlin: Berghof Foundation, 2012.
