= Second Coen Tunnel =

Tunnel in Amsterdam, the Netherlands

Coordinates: 52.4142°N 4.86389°E

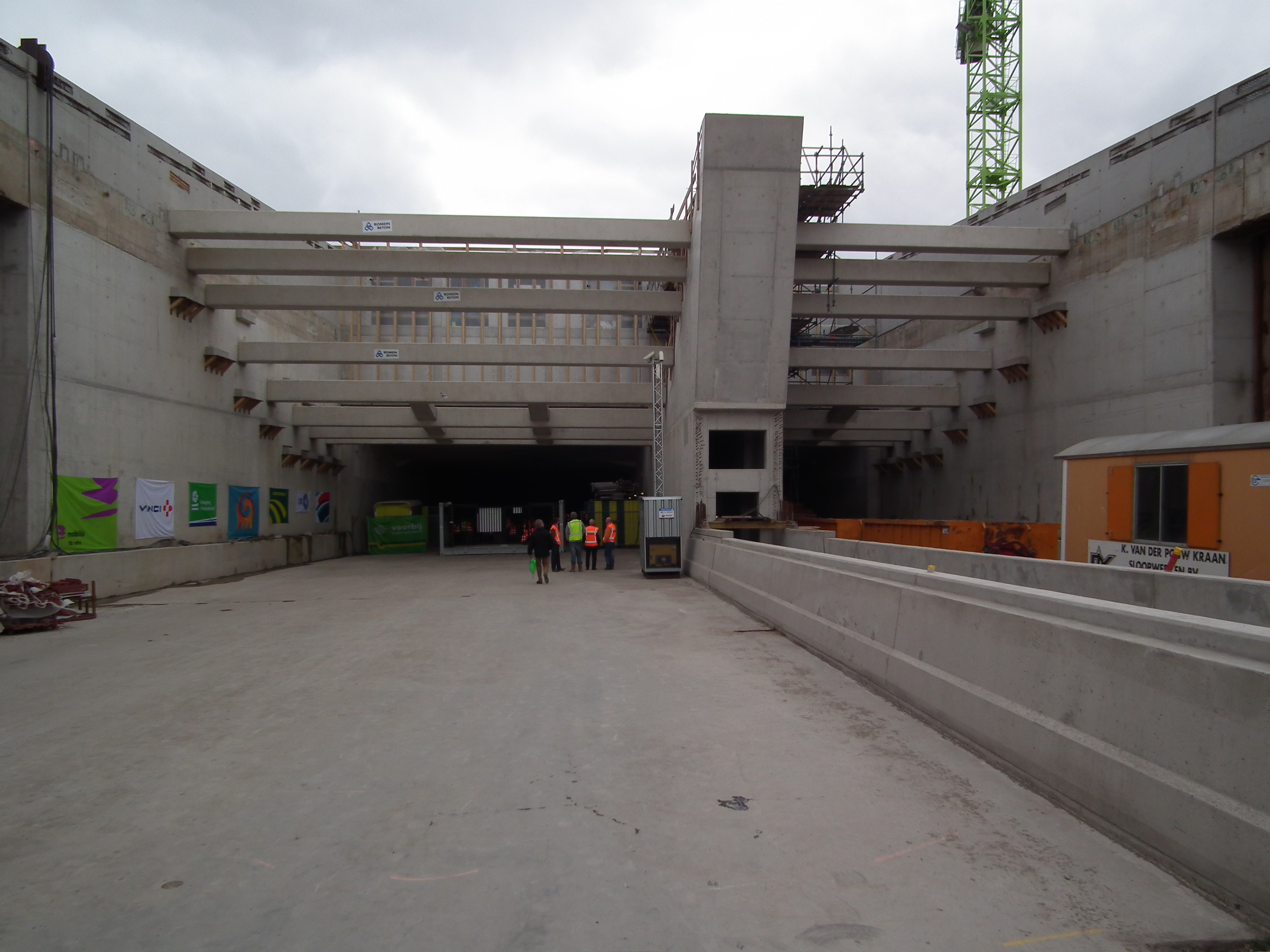
The Second Coen Tunnel in May 2011

The Second Coen Tunnel is a tunnel under the North Sea Canal, next to the Coen Tunnel in Amsterdam. The tunnel was built in combination with a new highway connection, the Westrandweg, to the A5 motorway. The tunnel consists of three fixed lanes and two reversible lanes, which are opened in the direction where traffic is the heaviest. The goal of the Second Coen Tunnel is to lighten congestion which occurs before the original Coen Tunnel on the A8 motorway in the morning and the A10-West motorway in the evening. This greatly increases the accessibility of Amsterdam from the north of the Netherlands.

The Second Coen Tunnel was procured under a public-private partnership model under a DBFM structure (design, build, finance, and maintain). The project was awarded to a consortium consisting of French group Vinci Concessions, CFE, Dredging International, Besix, Dura Vermeer, TBI Bouwgroep and Arcadis. The consortium was advised by financial advisors RebelGroup and Rabobank, with Clifford Chance acting as legal advisor in the project.

Total costs of the project are estimated at 1.2 billion euros and construction started on September 7, 2009. The tunnel was officially opened on July 21, 2014.
