= Coentunnel =

Tunnel in Amsterdam, Netherlands

Coordinates: 52°24′51″N 4°51′50″E

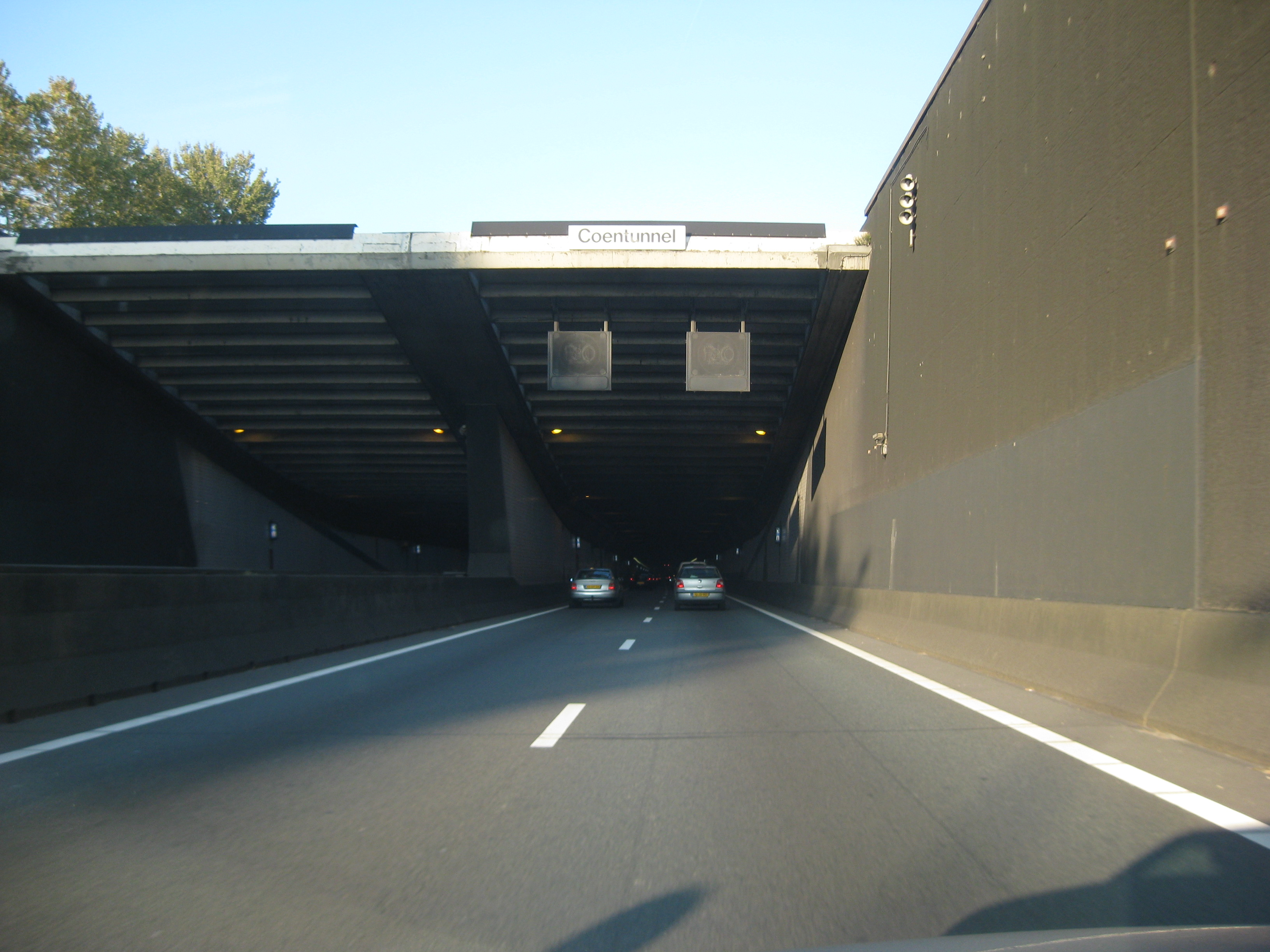
- Entrance

Overview
- Location: Amsterdam
- Status: Active

Operation
- Opened: 1966, 2013
- Traffic: Automotive
- Vehicles per day: 109,400 vehicles

Technical
- Length: 1.283 m

The Coentunnel (1966) is a tunnel in the A10 motorway under the North Sea Canal in western Amsterdam. The tunnel is named for the 17th-century colonizer Jan Pieterszoon Coen. The tunnel itself is 1283 metres long of which 587 metres are fully covered. The tunnel connects the Zaan district with the western part of Amsterdam. The tunnel reaches a maximum depth of 22 metres.

Before the tunnel was built, the Hem ferry and, to a lesser degree, the Schellingwouder bridge were the most important connections between Amsterdam and Zaandam, and this was a serious bottleneck for traffic. In 1959 5,800 vehicles were ferried daily and waiting times reached 45 minutes or more. In the 1950s inhabitants petitioned successfully for a tunnel under the North Sea Canal.

Construction commenced in 1961 and the total cost amounted to 45 million Dutch guilders. The opening of the tunnel was inaugurated on 21 June 1966 by Queen Juliana.

In 2007, more than 100,000 vehicles passed through the tunnel daily, again ensuring traffic congestion. The Second Coen Tunnel has been procured under a public-private partnership structure, and construction started in the summer of 2009. On 13 May 2013, the new tubes opened for traffic and the old tubes were closed for extensive renovation. It is expected that all four tubes will be available for traffic by mid-2014.
