= Drammensveien =

Street in Oslo, Norway

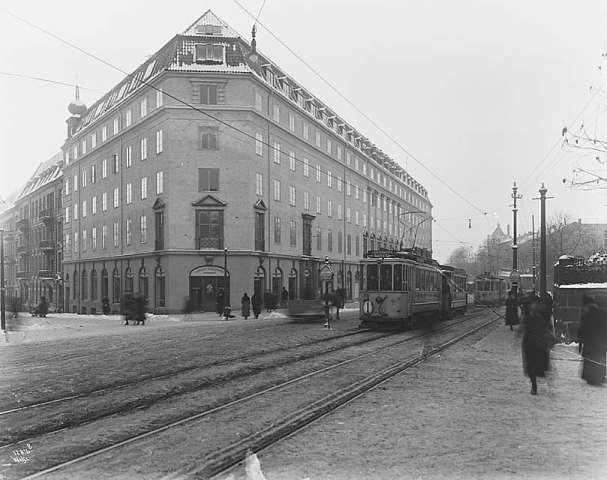
From Drammensveien, 1919.

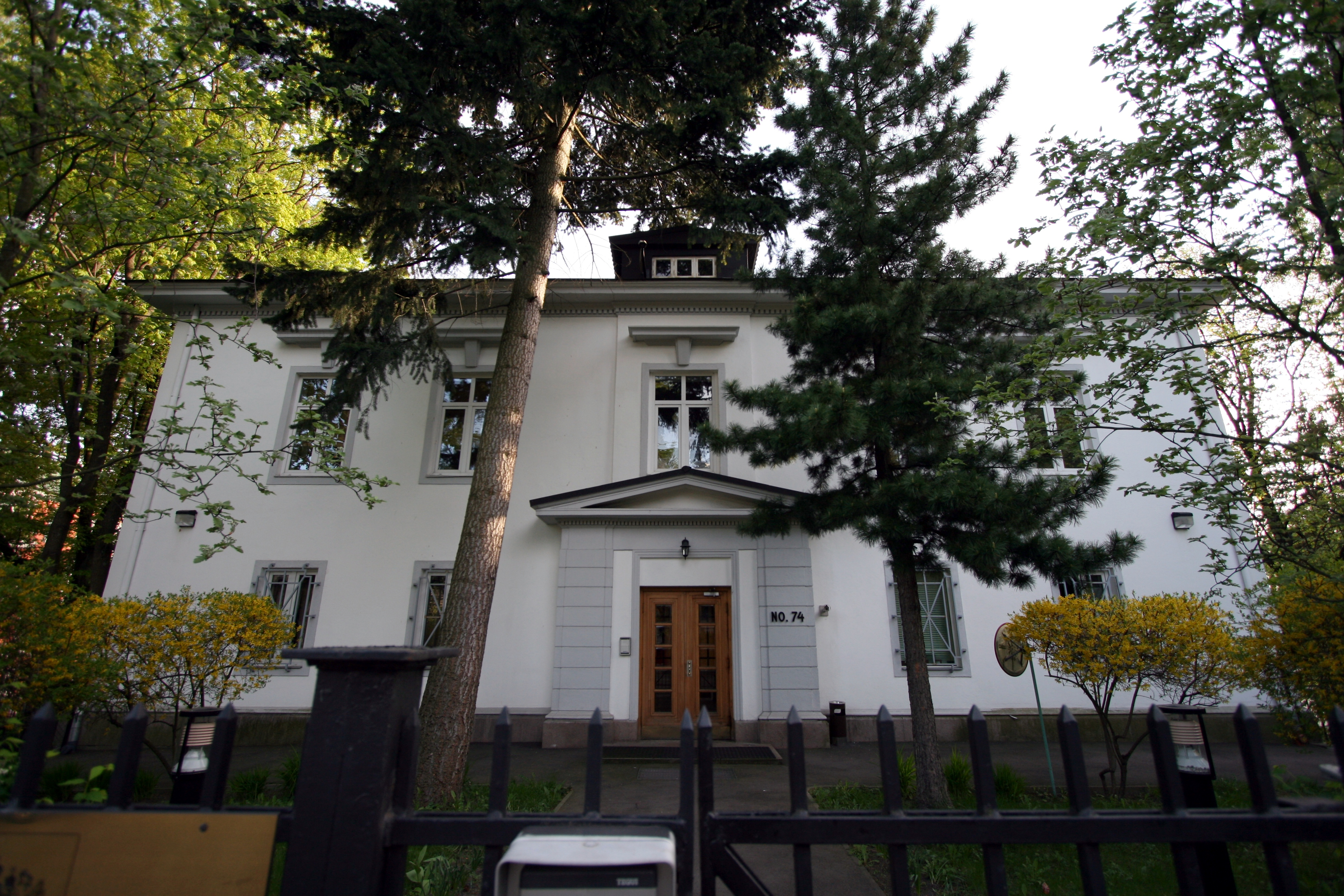
Drammensveien 74 was constructed in 1926, the former German legation in Oslo, from 1945 the Soviet, later Russian Embassy.

Drammensveien is a street in Oslo, Norway, and a highway between the cities Oslo and Drammen. The highway is the heaviest trafficked road in Norway. The original road Drammensveien was built for transport from Oslo to the foundry Bærums Verk and the silver mines at Kongsberg.
