= Vitalii Skakun =

Ukrainian military figure (1996-2022)

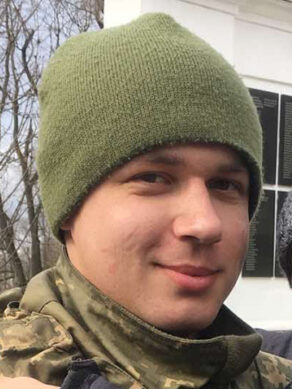
- Born: Vitalii Volodymyrovych Skakun; 19 August 1996; Berezhany, Ternopil Oblast, Ukraine
- Died: 24 February 2022 (aged 25); Henichesk, Kherson Oblast, Ukraine
- Alma mater: National University Lviv Polytechnic
- Children: 1
- Military career
- Allegiance: Ukraine
- Branch: Ukrainian Navy
- Service years: 2021–2022
- Rank: Seaman
- Units: 35th Naval Infantry Brigade "Rear Admiral Mikhail Ostrogradsky", Ukrainian Naval Infantry
- Conflicts: Russo-Ukrainian War; Russian invasion of Ukraine; Kherson offensive †
- Awards: Order of the Gold Star (posthumously)

Vitalii Volodymyrovych Skakun (Ukrainian: Віталій Володимирович Скакун; 19 August 1996 – 24 February 2022) was a Ukrainian marine combat engineer who was posthumously awarded the Order of the Gold Star. He sacrificed his life in the Russian invasion of Ukraine while blowing up a bridge in Henichesk while he was still on it to slow the advance of Russian troops during the Southern Ukraine campaign.

== Early life ==
Skakun was born on 19 August 1996 in Berezhany in western Ukraine. He attended the No. 3 school in Berezhany, where his mother was a member of the teaching staff. Later in Lviv, Skakun graduated from Higher Vocational School No. 20, where he studied to be a welder. He graduated from Lviv Polytechnic. In 2018, he lived for six months in Leszno, where he worked as a construction worker.

== Military career ==
During the 2022 Russian invasion of Ukraine, Skakun's battalion was deployed to protect the town of Henichesk, located near a crossing from Crimea to the mainland of Ukraine. As a Russian armored column approached the position, Ukrainian forces decided to destroy the bridge, to impede the advance of Russian troops travelling northward from Crimea during the Southern Ukraine campaign. Skakun, a combat engineer, volunteered to place mines on the bridge. On 24 February 2022, after placing the explosives, Skakun did not have enough time to withdraw from the bridge and, after communicating his intentions to his fellow soldiers, detonated the mines, killing himself and destroying the bridge. His actions slowed the Russian advance, allowing his battalion time to regroup.

== Legacy ==
On 26 February 2022, Skakun was posthumously awarded the Order of the Gold Star, the military version of the title of Hero of Ukraine, by Ukrainian President Volodymyr Zelenskyy.

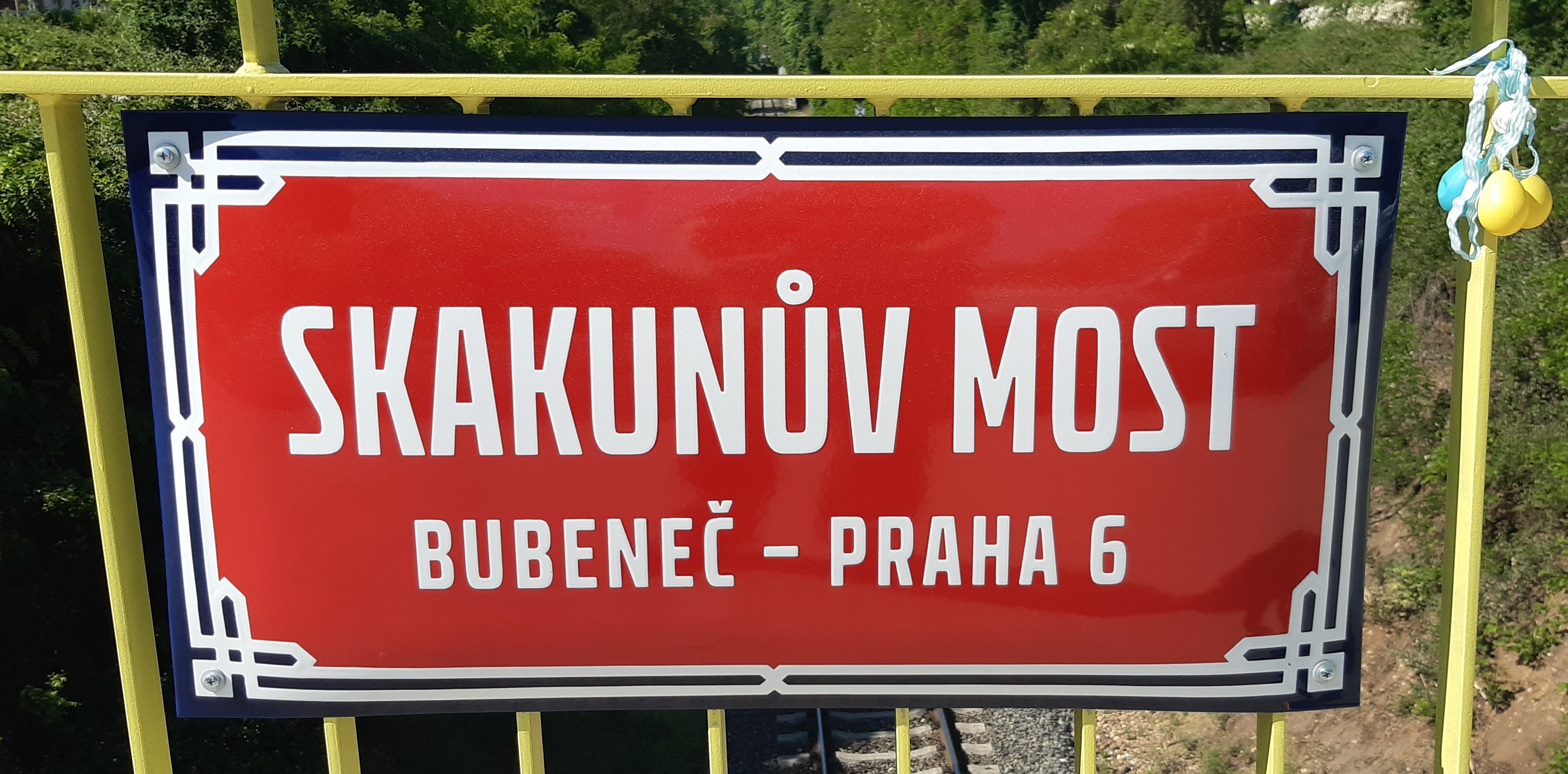
Sign on the Skakun's Bridge in Prague

On 28 February 2022, the Czech representative of one of Prague's city districts, Libor Bezděk, proposed to rename a bridge in Korunovační Street, which is the address of the Russian embassy, to Vitalij Skakun bridge. The proposal was accepted by the district and was forwarded to Prague City Council.

On 1 March 2022, the city council of Berezhany awarded the title of "Honorary Citizen of Berezhany" to Skakun.

On 7 March 2022, he was granted honorary citizenship of Leszno.

On April 24, 2024, in the village of Antonivka, 1 May Street was renamed to Vitaly Skakun Street.
