= Embassy of Russia, Prague =

Diplomatic mission of Russia to Czechia

Embassy of the Russian Federation in Prague Посольство Российской Федерации в Праге Velvyslanectví Ruské Federace v Praze
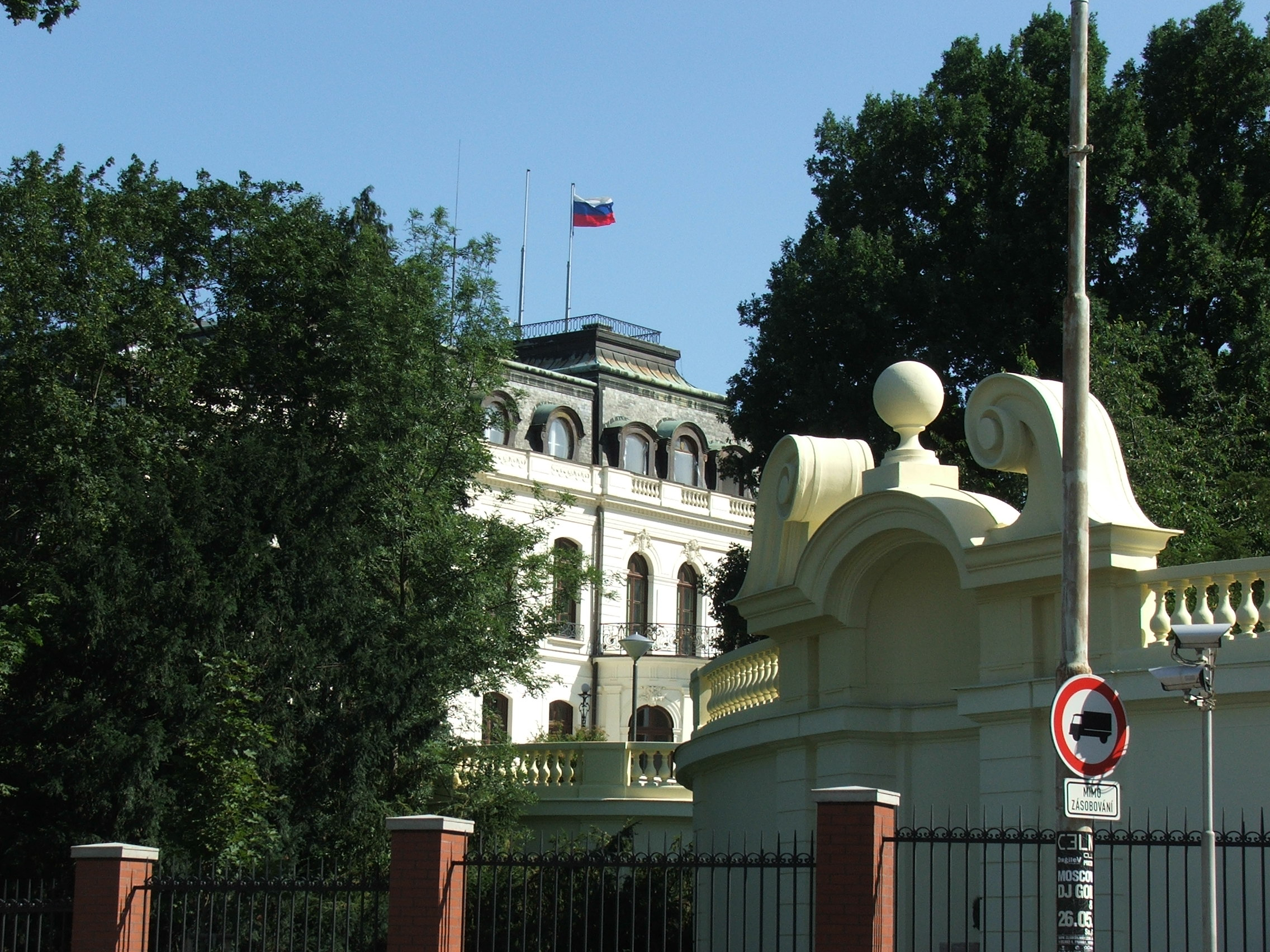
- Location: Prague
- Address: Ukrajinských hrdinů 6
- Coordinates: 50°6′13.53″N 14°24′50.9″E
- Ambassador: Aleksandr Zmeyevsky

The Embassy of Russia in Prague (Czech: Ruské velvyslanectví v Praze) is the diplomatic mission of the Russian Federation to the Czech Republic. The chancery is located at ul. Ukrajinských hrdinů 6 in the Bubeneč neighbourhood of Prague 6 district in Prague.

== History of the chancery ==
The building which is now the embassy chancery was bought by Jiří Popper, a Czech banker in 1927. Edvard Beneš, the then President of Czechoslovakia in exile and Jiří Popper, both of whom knew each other, fled to London on the same aircraft in 1938. The Bubeneč Popper house and surrounding land was confiscated by the Nazi authorities on 16 March 1939, a day after their occupation of Czechoslovakia, and was subsequently used as the Prague headquarters of the Gestapo. It was in this period of time that the embassy was fitted with a series of tunnels which housed Gestapo archives as well as a security hallway connecting the tunnels to the embassy. In 1945, after the end of the war, the family attempted to reclaim the property, but were prevented from doing so due to the nationalisation decrees issued by Edvard Beneš, who returned to Czechoslovakia as President. Although Beneš was aware that the Czech–Jewish banker was still alive and intended to return to Prague, he granted the property to the Soviet Union as a gift in thanks for the Soviet role in ending German rule in Czechoslovakia. The building was used by the Soviets to accommodate the embassy of the Soviet Union to Czechoslovakia. Following this shift in ownership, the Soviets worked to integrate the tunnels and secure rooms which were added by the Nazi government. It is a widely held belief that many of these rooms were used by KGB Line X officers for means of espionage and counter intelligence.

The Popper family were to receive compensation for the property, however, this did not eventuate due to the installation of a communist government in Czechoslovakia in 1948.

In 1990, laws were passed in Czechoslovakia which made it possible for restitution to be offered for property which was confiscated after 1948. The Czech Constitutional Court has overturned several of the Beneš decrees and in July 2008, Lisbeth Popper, the daughter of Jiří Popper, filed suit in the Czech courts against both the Czech and Russian States seeking restitution of the property. According to the court filings, the property is valued at CZK1 billion, which in the event of the claim being successful would be paid by the Czech State. The Russian state, which assumed title to all foreign property owned by the Soviet government after the dissolution of the USSR, would also lose title of the property and a new chancery for the Russian embassy to the Czech Republic would need to be found.

The Russian Ministry of Foreign Affairs states that the property is protected under current Czech legislation and international law and that it dismisses any attempts by parties to claim property of the Russian state, either inside or outside of Russia.

In 2020, the Prague city council renamed the plaza on which the embassy sits to náměstí Borise Němcova (Boris Nemtsov Square), after the Russian opposition politician who was murdered in 2015. In response, the embassy changed its official address to 36 Korunovační Street, the address of the embassy's consular division, on the same property but with its address on the adjacent street. The embassy described Korunovační Street as "historical" and said "the probability of its renaming is much lower than that of the recently appeared 'Boris Nemtsov square.'" Following the Russian invasion of Ukraine, on 22 April 2022 the Prague city council also renamed a short stretch of Korunovační Street in front of the embassy to "Ukrajinských hrdinů" (in English: Ukrainian heroes), so the embassy's address is now Ukrajinských hrdinů 6.

== See also ==
- Czech Republic–Russia relations
