= World Influencer Business Awards =

Awards for online content creators

- Awarded for: Social media content and influence
- Location: Hôtel Martinez, Cannes
- Country: France
- Presented by: World Influencers Association
- Established: Mariia Grazhina Chaplin
- First award: 2019
- Website: wibaawards.com

The World Influencer Business Awards, also known as the WIBA Awards and formerly the World Influencers and Bloggers Awards, are an international series of awards for social media influencers and online content creators. Established by producer Mariia Grazhina Chaplin, the awards were first presented at the Hôtel Martinez in Cannes, France, on 24 May 2019. They are organised by the Monaco-based World Influencers Association and recognise work in fields including fashion, beauty, food and entertainment.

== History ==
=== Establishment and early editions ===
Mariia Grazhina Chaplin, founder of the WIBA Awards

The inaugural event was held under the name World Bloggers Awards during the 2019 Cannes Film Festival. Its awards covered several types of online content, including comedy, technology, food and fashion. Gianluca Vacchi received the Grand Prix, while Nusret Gökçe and Jonathan Cheban, known as Foodgod, received awards in the celebrity and food categories, respectively. Indian recipients included Bhuvan Bam, Ashish Chanchlani and Gaurav Chaudhary. Their awards were reported by the advertising-industry publication Campaign India.

The 2020 edition took place online because of restrictions associated with the COVID-19 pandemic. Its digital competition included separate Expert Blogger, Advanced Blogger and Junior Blogger categories. Katerina Leroy was listed as the Expert Blogger winner.

The third edition was held at the Hôtel Martinez on 12 July 2021. It used a hybrid format, combining an in-person ceremony with prerecorded contributions from recipients who could not attend because of travel restrictions. Awards included recognition for Coco Rocha for career achievement and innovation in fashion, Ellen von Unwerth for photography, and Kat Graham for human-rights advocacy. The edition also included awards for Indian dance, comedy, and fashion and lifestyle creators.

=== Subsequent editions ===
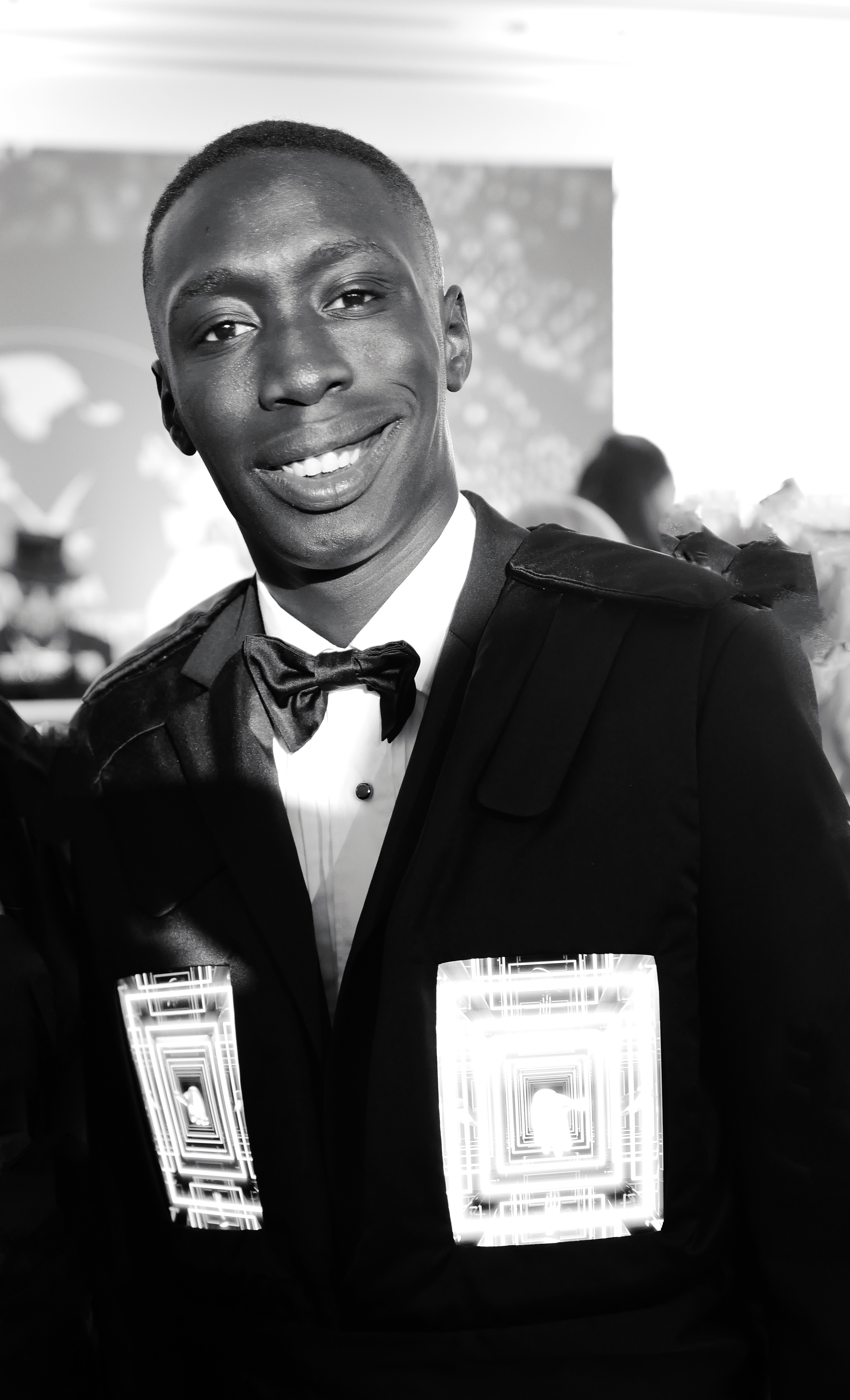
Khaby Lame at the 2022 WIBA Awards

The fourth ceremony took place in Cannes on 18 May 2022. Recipients included Khaby Lame, Nikkie Tutorials, Alec Monopoly, Mădălina Ghenea and Stepan the cat. The event also collected donations for children affected by the Russian invasion of Ukraine.

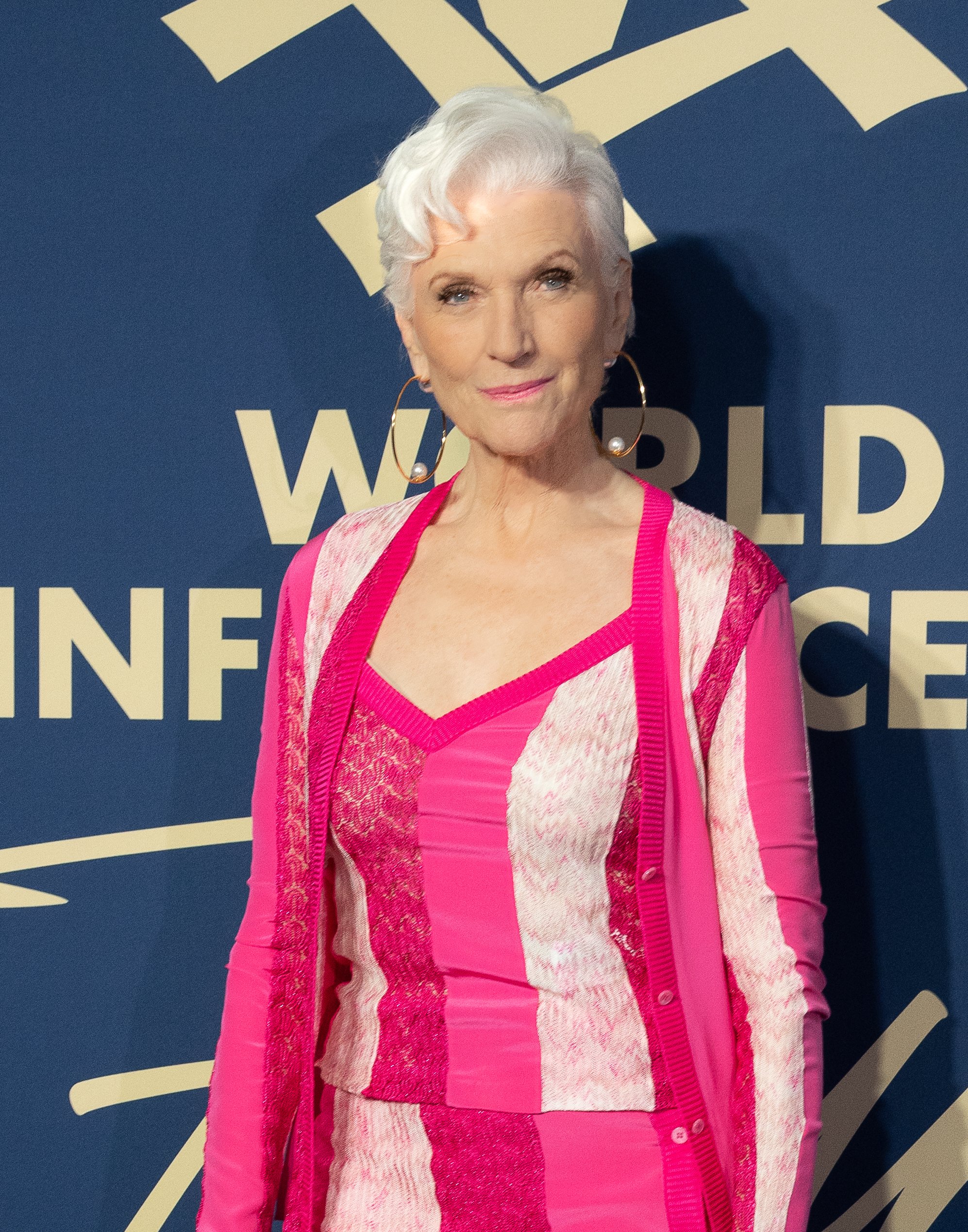
Maye Musk at the 2023 WIBA Awards

At the fifth edition, held on 26 May 2023, Domelipa received the Grand Prix. Other recipients included Maye Musk, Richard Orlinski and Halima Aden. The sixth edition took place on 24 May 2024 at the Hôtel Martinez. Burak Özdemir received the Grand Prix, and Léna Situations and Coco Rocha were among the other recipients. The ceremony included a performance by Sonique.

The seventh edition was held on 23 May 2025 at the same venue. Panda Boi received the Grand Prix; other recipients included Patricia Bright, Jasmin Gassmann and Abi Marquez. Panjabi MC performed at the ceremony.

The eighth edition took place on 22 May 2026. For the first time, the awards recognised an AI-generated influencer, Chloe vs History. L'Officiel Monaco reported that the ceremony was also filmed for a planned television production.

=== Name ===
The event initially used the name World Bloggers Awards. By its 2025 edition, it was promoted as the World Influencers and Bloggers Awards. By November 2026, the official website used the name World Influencer Business Awards, while retaining the WIBA abbreviation.

== Organisation and selection ==
The World Influencers Association is based in Monaco. According to the organisers' published nomination procedure, candidates may be proposed by the WIBA committee, apply directly, or be nominated through association membership. Applications approved by the committee are referred to judges and an advisory board.

As of November 2026, the official website also advertised paid nominee application packages. These included association membership, media coverage and nomination in a personal-brand category, subject to committee approval.

Alongside the awards, the association organises the World Influencers Forum, which it describes as an event bringing together creators and brands for discussions and business networking.

== Recipients ==
The following tables list recipients by year. They include the recipients covered in this article's sources, rather than an exhaustive record of every category. Award titles and categories have varied between editions.

=== 2019 ===
| Recipient | Award or category |
|---|---|
| Gianluca Vacchi | King of Instagram – Grand Prix |
| Nusret Gökçe | Best Celebrity Influencer |
| Foodgod | Best Food Influencer |
| Bhuvan Bam | Best Entertainment Influencer |
| Victoria Silvstedt | Best Glamour Influencer |
| Greta Thunberg | Best Sustainable Influencer |
| Anna Andres | Best Fashion Business Influencer |
| Zaklina Berrido Pisano | Best Style Influencer |
| Alice, Farah and Nadine Abdelaziz | Best Sisterhood |
| Sharon Fonseca | Best Model Influencer |

=== 2020 ===
| Recipient | Award or category |
|---|---|
| Katerina Leroy | Grand Prix, Expert Blogger Digital Contest |

=== 2021 ===
| Recipient | Award or category |
|---|---|
| Coco Rocha | Fashion Industry Influencer: Lifetime Achievement and Innovation Award |
| Ellen von Unwerth | Iconic Photographer Influencer |
| Kat Graham | Human Rights Advocate |
| Elisabetta Gregoraci | Media Personality Influencer |
| Sadaf Beauty | Beauty Glam Influencer |
| Ginta | Digital contest: best entertainment account, Expert Blogger category |
| Malcolm the Akita | Digital contest: best animal account, Expert Blogger category |

=== 2022 ===
| Recipient | Award or category |
|---|---|
| Khaby Lame | Grand Prix |
| Nikkie Tutorials | Celebrity Beauty Influencer |
| Kelly Rutherford | Business Lady Influencer |
| Mădălina Ghenea | Actress and Producer Influencer |
| Alec Monopoly | Art Influencer |
| Johan Ernst Nilson | Activist Influencer |
| Marta Sierra | Fashion Influencer |
| Elnaz Gorlokh | Beauty Influencer |
| Jamala | Cultural Influencer |
| Stepan the Cat | Animal Influencer |
| Aliia Roza | Women Empowerment Influencer |

=== 2023 ===
| Recipient | Award or category |
|---|---|
| Domelipa | Grand Prix |
| Maye Musk | World’s Most Influential Woman |
| Richard Orlinski | Most Influential Artist of the Decade |
| Iuliia Mendel | Influential Spokesperson |
| Kiera Chaplin | Women’s Rights Advocate |
| Halima Aden | Women Empowerment |
| Marina Mogilko | Best Education Influencer |
| Swan Sit | Top Clubhouse Influencer |
| Mani Nordine | Empowerment Artistic Business Leader |
| Oli London | Self-Awareness Inspirational Influencer |
| Holly Ramsay | Mental Health Advocate |
| Noha Nabil | Beauty Influencer |
| Kjetil Krogstad | Best Entertainment Influencer |

=== 2024 ===
| Recipient | Award or category |
|---|---|
| Burak Özdemir | Grand Prix |
| Coco Rocha | Fashion Model Business Icon and Women Empowerment Advocate |
| Léna Situations | Motivation and Encouragement Lifestyle Influencer |
| Alexandre Maras | Most Influential Journalist in Social Media |
| Hyram | Best Influential Skincare Expert |
| Mohamed Cheikh | French contest winner, food category |
| Reem Khabbazeh | Most Influential Social Personality of the Middle East |
| Lee Levi | Influential Actress in Social Media |
| Maxim Ivanchuk | Best Aesthetic Medicine Influencer |
| Esteriore Brothers | Best Entertainment Influencers |
| Max Mariola | Best Food Influencer |
| Sasha Ray | Fashion Lifestyle Influencer |
| Jeff Hamilton | Influential Celebrity Fashion Artist |
| Pietro Checchi | New Name of Italian TikTok |
| Marcello D’Onofrio | Empowerment Celebrities Management Leader |
| Nadine Mirada | European Model Influencer |
| Daniel Asante | Social Media Model Influencer |
| Alex & Tom | Best Education Influencers |
| Elena Hazinah | Best Beauty Influencer |
| Angelina Usanova | Social Activity and Philanthropy Influencer |
| Franciny Ehlke | Best Latin America Influencer |
| Youmna Khoury | Influential Beauty Business Leader |
| Urvashi Rautela | Influential Indian Star |
| Anastasia Tupitsyna | Best Creative Beauty Influencer |
| Sheryl Smith | Mauritius contest winner |
| Valeria Voronina | Art Entertainment Influencer |

=== 2025 ===
| Recipient | Award or category |
|---|---|
| Panda Boi | Grand Prix |
| Jasmin Gassmann | Influential Actress in Social Media |
| Mara Lafontan | Motivational Lifestyle Influencer |
| Jodok Vuille | Music Art Influencer |
| Zarina Yeva | Fashion Socialite |
| Aurélie | Travel Influencer |
| Tony Czech | Sports Entertainment |
| Taha Shah Badussha | Influential Actor in Social Media |
| Virginia Varinelli | Fashion Business Influencer |
| Argy | Contemporary Art Influencer |
| Georgi Sandev | Influential Celebrity Makeup Artist |
| Jennifer Yepez | Influential Celebrity Hair Stylist |
| Edouard Siney | Best Talents’ Agent |
| Misha Miller | Trendsetter Influencer |
| Jessica De Oliveira | Fashion Entertainment Influencer |
| Patricia Bright | Most Successful Britain’s Social Media Personality |
| Ozodbek Khurramov | Leading Middle Asia Influencer |
| Nutsa | Singer Influencer |
| Whitney Uland | Influential Talents’ Coach |
| Maren Tschinkel | Influential Health and Wellness Model |
| Leane Marts | Beauty Influencer |
| Karolina Agata Sankiewicz | Glamorous Sport Influencer |
| Shintaro Kambara and Kenta Kambara | Young Visionary Designers Award |
| Lionfield | Entertainment Influencers |
| Bilonda Alice Mukendi | Multi Platform Influencer |
| Abi Marquez | Food Influencer |
| Charlie Griffon | Best Pet Influencer |
| Sean Sudarshan Rajan, founder of The Billionaires’ Club | Influential Luxury Society |
| Shanny Ramsamy | Mauritius contest winner |
| Anna Lopez | Honorary Loyalty Award |

=== 2026 ===
| Recipient | Award or category |
|---|---|
| Isabeli Fontana | Model Creator of the Year |
| Rahi Chadda | Fashion Icon of the Year |
| Chiara King | Creator of the Year |
| Julien Cohen | Music Culture Impact |
| Anastasia (Anastasile) | Beauty Creator of the Year |
| Zulay Pogba | Lifestyle Creator of the Year |
| Marsha Dunkel | Sport Creator |
| Dastan Mukhamedrakhim | Travel Creator |
| Chloe vs History | AI Creator of the Year |
| Volodymyr Testardi | Food Creator |
| Carmen, Robert, Davina and Shania Geiss | Most Influential Family |
| Elettra Lamborghini | Influential TV Personality |
| Berite Labelle | Inspirational Influencer Award |
| Marco Ferra | Creative Vision in Fashion |
| Leanne Ansar | Storytelling Creator |
| Franziska Nazarenus | Fashion Entertainment Influencer |
| Kellyn Sun | French Riviera Creator |
| Samet Görgöz | Cinematic Content Creator |
| Emma Guerrero | Modern Motherhood |
| Theo Rose | Entertainment Influencer |
| Virginia Stablum | New Talent of the Year |
| Giulia Paglianti | Young Influencer of the Year |
| Rahab Alharbi | Middle East Fashion Icon |
| Reemy | Young Talent of the Middle East |
