= Miss Ukraine 2016 =

- Date: 2 September 2016
- Presenters: Yuriy Horbunov and Kateryna Osadcha
- Entertainment: Jamala • Tina Karol • Max Barskih • Monatik • Alloise • ALEKSEEV • PUR:PUR • PLAY
- Venue: October Palace, Kyiv
- Entrants: 25
- Placements: 12
- Winner: Oleksandra Kucherenko; Dnipropetrovsk Oblast

Miss Ukraine 2016, the 26th edition of the Miss Ukraine pageant was held at the October Palace in Kyiv on 2 September 2016. Twenty-five contestants from across Ukraine competed for the crown. The competition was hosted by Yuriy Horbunov and Kateryna Osadcha. Khrystyna Stoloka of Kyiv crowned her successor Oleksandra Kucherenko of Dnipro at the end of the event. Kucherenko represented Ukraine at the Miss World 2016 pageant where she unplaced.

== Results ==
=== Placements ===
Placement	Contestant
Miss Ukraine 2016	Dnipropetrovsk Oblast – Oleksandra Kucherenko
Miss International Ukraine 2016	Odesa Oblast – Viktoriya Kiose
Miss Earth Ukraine 2016	Vinnytsia Oblast – Alyona Bielova
1st Runner-Up	Kyiv Oblast – Darina Buyanova
2nd Runner-Up	Donetsk Oblast – Valeriya Shatska
Top 6	Chernivtsi Oblast – Kateryna Kalchenko
Top 12	Vinnytsia Oblast – Nina Krokhmalyuk; Mykolaiv Oblast – Anastasiya Kuzevich; Zaporizhia Oblast – Kateryna Levochko; Kyiv Oblast – Maryna Leonova; Odesa Oblast – Alla Merzhan; Zhytomyr Oblast – Maryna Yarosh

=== Special awards ===
Award	Contestant
Miss People's Choice	Chernivtsi Oblast – Alina Anel
Miss Online	Odesa Oblast – Viktoriya Kiose
Miss IV Seasons	Vinnytsia Oblast – Alyona Bielova

== Contestants ==
No.	Name	Age	Representing
1	Alina Anel	23	Chernivtsi Oblast
2	Liubov Bakay	20	Lviv Oblast
3	Tetiana Bakulina	22	Poltava Oblast
4	Alyona Bielova	21	Vinnytsia Oblast
5	Anna Bondar	24	Kyiv Oblast
6	Darina Buyanova	18	Kyiv Oblast
7	Anastasiya Hrin	18	Zaporizhzhia Oblast
8	Kateryna Kalchenko	21	Chernivtsi Oblast
9	Viktoriya Kiose	23	Odesa Oblast
10	Anastasiya Klovanych	19	Lviv Oblast
11	Nina Krokhmalyuk	21	Vinnytsia Oblast
12	Anastasiya Kuzevich	23	Mykolaiv Oblast
13	Oleksandra Kucherenko	18	Dnipropetrovsk Oblast
14	Kateryna Levochko	17	Zaporizhzhia Oblast
15	Maryna Leonova	23	Kyiv Oblast
16	Alla Merzhan	21	Odesa Oblast
17	Diana Peresta	19	Zakarpattia Oblast
18	Daria Polishchuk	18	Vinnytsia Oblast
19	Anna Ponochevna	18	Kyiv Oblast
20	Alina Rabcheniuk	20	Rivne Oblast
21	Valeriya Rudenko	21	Donetsk Oblast
22	Yulia Sidorenko	18	Kharkiv Oblast
23	Andriana Turkevych	19	Zakarpattia Oblast
24	Valeriya Shatska	22	Donetsk Oblast
25	Maryna Yarosh	18	Zhytomyr Oblast

== Jury ==
- Oleg Verniaiev – Ukrainian gymnast, Olympic champion at Rio 2016 Olimpics
- Vlada Litovchenko – public figure, model, "Miss Ukraine 1995", PhD in History
- Vladimir Goryansky – People's Artist of Ukraine, film and theater actor
- Alina Baykova – top model, businesswoman
- Olga Vnukova – TV presenter, model, editor-in chief of "Most beautiful Ukrainian women"
- Julia Aysina – designer, founder of the brand AYSINA
- Dmitry Komarov – journalist, photographer, author and host of "World Inside Out" on 1+1 TV Channel
- Andre Tan – fashion designer, inventor of Smart Couture style
- Ana Varava – chief-editor of L'Officiel-Ukraine magazine
- Elizaveta Chepel – casting director of the National Committee of Miss Ukraine
