= Miss Ukraine 2021 =

- Date: 21 October 2021
- Presenters: Volodymyr Dantes; Taras Tsimbalyuk; Timur Miroshnychenko; Vladyslav Yama
- Entertainment: Tina Karol; Monatik; Dorofeeva; Go_A; Artem Pivovarov; Kadnay; Wellboy; Tvorchi
- Venue: Palace "Ukraine", Kyiv
- Broadcaster: 1+1 (TV channel)
- Entrants: 25
- Placements: 12
- Winner: Oleksandra Yaremchuk; Vinnytsia Oblast

Miss Ukraine 2021 was the 30th Miss Ukraine pageant, held at the Palace "Ukraine" in Kyiv on 21 October 2021. Twenty-five contestants from across Ukraine competed for the crown. The competition was hosted by Volodymyr Dantes, Taras Tsimbalyuk, Timur Miroshnychenko and Vladyslav Yama. Oleksandra Yaremchuk of Vinnytsia Oblast was crowned at the end of the event. Yaremchuk represented Ukraine at the Miss World 2021 pageant where she unplaced.

== Results ==
=== Placements ===
Final results	Contestant
Miss Ukraine 2021	Vinnytsia Oblast – Oleksandra Yaremchuk
Miss International Ukraine 2021	Vinnytsia Oblast – Olha Shamrai
Miss Earth Ukraine 2021	Zaporizhzhia Oblast – Marina Litvin
Top 6	Donetsk Oblast – Luiza Filatova; Mykolaiv Oblast – Dariya Zotova; Lviv Oblast – Veronika Benyakh
Top 12	Zakarpattia Oblast – Anita Dmytrovska; Lviv Oblast – Yuliya Hotsak; Kharkiv Oblast – Nika Kuznietsova; Vinnytsia Oblast – Maria Myskova; Kharkiv Oblast – Kristina Seleznova; Kharkiv Oblast - Yuliya Andriyenko

=== Special awards ===
Award	Contestant
Vice Miss Ukraine 2021	Donetsk Oblast – Luiza Filatova
Miss People's Choice 2021	Ternopil Oblast – Marta Reznichenko
Miss Instagram 2021	Rivne Oblast – Alina Lyashuk

== Contestants ==
No.	Name	Age	Representing
1	Anita Dmytrovska	26	Zakarpattia Oblast
2	Evelina Yavkina	21	Kyiv Oblast
3	Nantina Dronchak	26	Vinnytsia Oblast
4	Yuliya Hotsak	19	Lviv Oblast
5	Maria Bobrovna	22	Zaporizhzhia Oblast
6	Nika Kuznietsova	20	Kharkiv Oblast
7	Darya Hovtva	26	Kharkiv Oblast
8	Luiza Filatova	22	Donetsk Oblast
9	Oleksandra Yaremchuk	22	Vinnytsia Oblast
10	Sofiya Starzhynska	20	Ternopil Oblast
11	Alina Lyashuk	26	Rivne Oblast
12	Maria Myskova	24	Vinnytsia Oblast
13	Marta Reznichenko	20	Ternopil Oblast
14	Kristina Seleznova	23	Kharkiv Oblast
15	Yuliya Andriyenko	25	Kharkiv Oblast
16	Olha Shamrai	24	Vinnytsia Oblast
17	Irina Dzhaharova	24	Kharkiv Oblast
18	Viktoriya Helytyuk	20	Vinnytsia Oblast
19	Yelyzaveta Miroshnichenko	23	Vinnytsia Oblast
20	Veronika Vozna	22	Lviv Oblast
21	Anastasiya Rudaya	26	Odesa Oblast
22	Anastasiya Tuhai	21	Kyiv Oblast
23	Marina Litvin	20	Zaporizhzhia Oblast
24	Darya Zotova	20	Mykolaiv Oblast
25	Veronika Benyakh	21	Lviv Oblast

== Jury ==
- Johan Ernst Nilson
- Jacob Arabo
- Simon de Pury
- Tina Karol
- Alec Monopoly
- Cindy Bruna
- Andre Tan
- Sonya Plakidyuk
- Irina Tatarenko
- Veronika Shchyptsova (Head of Miss Ukraine National Committee)
