= CZN =

CZN may refer to:

- Chisana Airport, a public use airport in Alaska
- CZN Burak, Turkish chef and restaurateur
