= Miss Ukraine 2017 =

- Date: 6 September 2017
- Presenters: Yuriy Horbunov; Kateryna Osadcha
- Entertainment: Max Barskih • Tina Karol • Olya Polyakova • Monatik • Vremya i Steklo • TamerlanAlena • Tayanna • PLAY Group • Lucky4
- Venue: Palace Ukraina, Pecherskyi District, Kyiv, Ukraine
- Entrants: 24
- Placements: 12
- Winner: Polina Tkach; Kyiv

Miss Ukraine 2017, the 27th edition of the Miss Ukraine pageant was held at the Palace "Ukraine" in Kyiv on 6 September 2017. Twenty-four contestants from across Ukraine competed for the crown. The competition was hosted by Yuriy Horbunov and Kateryna Osadcha. Oleksandra Kucherenko of Dnipro crowned her successor Polina Tkach of Kyiv at the end of the event. Tkach represented Ukraine at the Miss World 2017 pageant where she placed in the top 40.

== Results ==
=== Placements ===
Placement	Contestant
Miss Ukraine 2017	Kyiv – Polina Tkach
Miss International Ukraine 2017	Zaporizhzhia – Kseniya Chifa
Miss Earth Ukraine 2017	Odesa – Diana Myronenko
1st Runner-Up	Lviv Oblast – Iryna Tkachuk
2nd Runner-Up	Kharkiv – Emiliya Shakh
Top 6	Odesa Oblast – Valeria Mykhaylova
Top 12	Kyiv – Ilona Vasko; Zhytomyr Oblast – Kateryna Huslyakova; Rivne Oblast – Yuliya Karpets; Lviv – Roksolana Yaminska; Poltava – Ilona Mamchur; Donetsk Oblast – Olena Sebba

=== Special awards ===
Award	Contestant
Miss Audience Sympathy (missukraine.ua) 2017	Kharkiv - Daryna Mitchenko
Miss Audience Sympathy (jetsetter.ua) 2017	Rivne Oblast - Yuliya Karpets
Miss Online 2017	Kyiv - Mariya Ivanova
Miss Ukraine Top Model 2017	Poltava - Ilona Mamchur

== Contestants ==
No.	Name	Age	Height	Representing
1	Ilona Vasko	24	1.75 m (5 ft 9 in)	Kyiv
2	Kateryna Huslyakova	23	1.77 m (5 ft 9 1/2 in)	Zhytomyr Oblast
3	Mariya Ivanova	24	1.67 m (5 ft 5 1/2 in)	Kyiv
4	Yuliya Karpets	17	1.79 m (5 ft 10 1/2 in)	Rivne Oblast
5	Yevheniya Kryvorotko	19	1.69 m (5 ft 6 1/2 in)	Zaporizhzhia Oblast
6	Roksolana Yaminska	22	1.80 m (5 ft 11 in)	Lviv
7	Ilona Mamchur	20	1.76 m (5 ft 9 1/2 in)	Poltava
8	Anna Melnyk	19	1.80 m (5 ft 11 in)	Vinnytsia Oblast
9	Diana Myronenko	23	1.76 m (5 ft 9 1/2 in)	Odesa
10	Daryna Mitchenko	25	1.75 m (5 ft 9 in)	Kharkiv
11	Valeria Mykhaylova	23	1.76 m (5 ft 9 1/2 in)	Odesa Oblast
12	Vladyslava Onypko	20	1.76 m (5 ft 9 1/2 in)	Kharkiv Oblast
13	Anastasiya Pshenychna	19	1.76 m (5 ft 9 1/2 in)	Poltava Oblast
14	Alina Rudan	25	1.77 m (5 ft 9 1/2 in)	Odesa Oblast
15	Anna-Maryana Samoluk	20	1.70 m (5 ft 7 in)	Lviv Oblast
16	Olena Sebba	21	1.79 m (5 ft 10 1/2 in)	Donetsk Oblast
17	Olena Smakous	22	1.75 m (5 ft 9 in)	Ternopil Oblast
18	Yelyzaveta Tatarina	17	1.76 m (5 ft 9 1/2 in)	Dnipropetrovsk Oblast
19	Polina Tkach	18	1.76 m (5 ft 9 1/2 in)	Kyiv
20	Iryna Tkachuk	18	1.74 m (5 ft 8 1/2 in)	Lviv Oblast
21	Kseniya Chyfa	24	1.75 m (5 ft 9 in)	Zaporizhzhia
22	Daryna Chuyko	19	1.71 m (5 ft 7 1/2 in)	Dnipropetrovsk Oblast
23	Emiliya Shakh	21	1.69 m (5 ft 6 1/2 in)	Kharkiv
24	Marta Shevchuk	21	1.77 m (5 ft 9 1/2 in)	Lviv Oblast

== Judges ==
- Vlada Litovchenko - public figure, "Miss Ukraine 1995"
- Vladimir Goryansky - People's Artist of Ukraine, actor of theater and cinema
- Alina Baikova - top model, businesswoman
- Julia Aisina - designer, founder of the brand AYSINA
- Dmitry Komarov - journalist, photographer, author and presenter of the program "The World Inside Out" on the channel 1 + 1
- Andre Tan - designer clothes, inventor of the Smart Couture style
- Alena Shoptenko - choreographer, participant of the TV show "Dancing with the Stars"
- Nikolay Tishchenko - restaurateur, TV host
- Ekaterina Kukhar - ballerina of the National Opera of Ukraine
- Elizaveta Chepel - casting director of the National Committee Miss Ukraine
