= Philipp Plein =

German fashion designer and entrepreneur (born 1978)

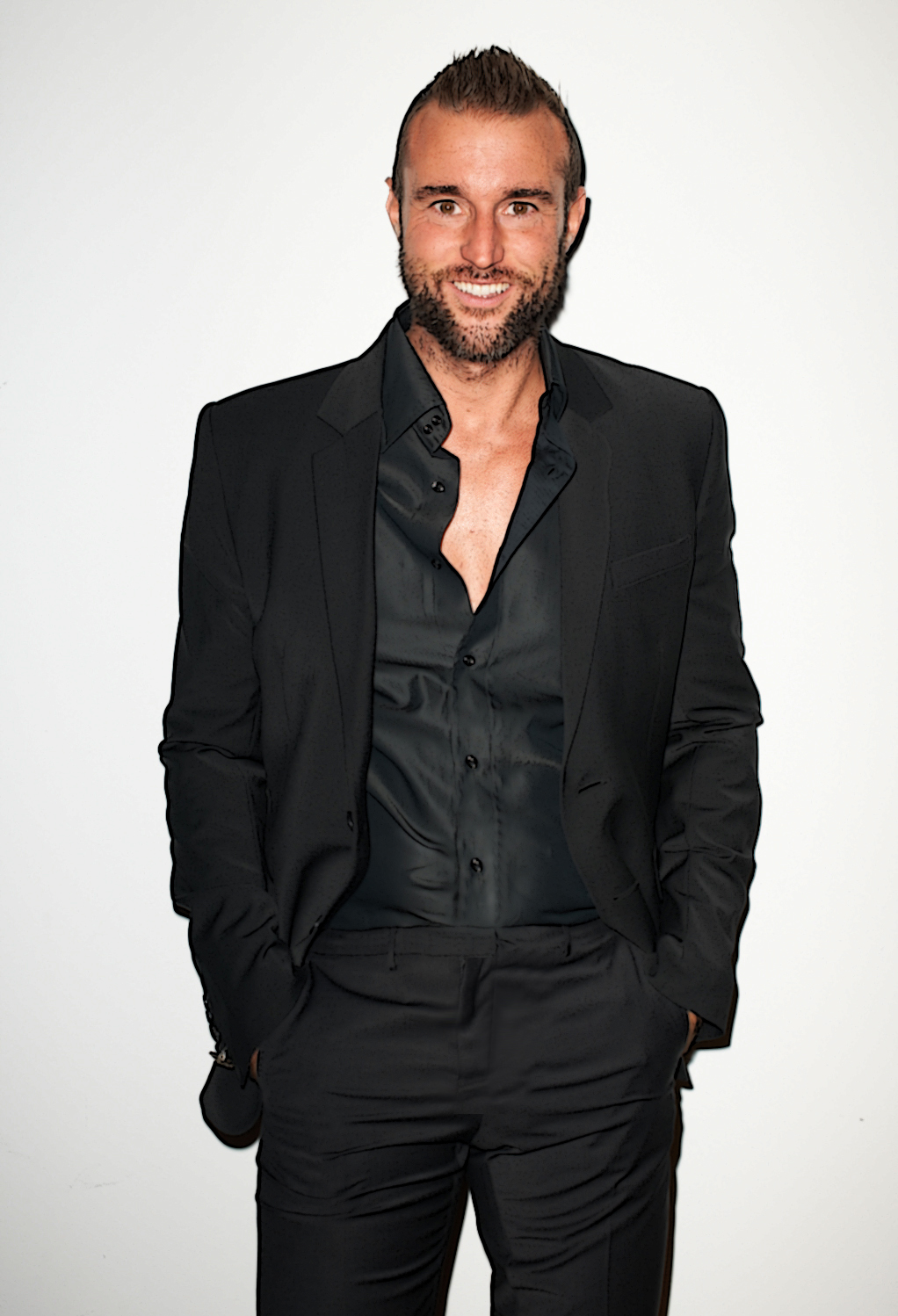
- Plein in 2012
- Born: Philipp Patrick Hannes Plein; 16 February 1978 (age 48); Munich, West Germany
- Education: University of Erlangen-Nuremberg
- Label: Philipp Plein
- Children: 4

Philipp Patrick Hannes Plein (born 16 February 1978) is a German fashion designer, entrepreneur, and the founder of the Philipp Plein International Group, which includes the Philipp Plein, Plein Sport, and Billionaire brands.

He is the founder and CEO of the Plein Group and of Plein Holding headquartered in Lugano, Switzerland, which specializes in the creation, manufacture and distribution of luxury goods. He is also the head designer of the brands Philipp Plein, Billionaire, Plein Sport and Plein Golf.

Plein has an estimated net worth of Euro 800 million as of May 2023, according to Forbes magazine.

Plein has been consistently listed as one of the 300 richest individuals in Switzerland in the annual reports published by Bilanz.

In 1998, Plein registered the trademark Philipp Plein and founded his enterprise specializing in luxury goods.

== Early life ==
Philipp Patrick Hannes Plein was born on 16 February 1978 in Munich, Bavaria Germany.

His mother Hanne Plein–Dieth is a housewife, and his father Gunter Plein was a doctor. Gunter Plein had an alcohol addiction and left the family. Hanne Plein-Dieth filed for divorce when Philipp was three years old. After his parents divorced, his mother married another doctor, Klaus Michael-Dieth. His sister Gloria Epstein Plein was born 7 October 1987.

In 1998, Plein graduated from college at boarding school Schule Schloss Salem in Germany and started to study law at the Friedrich Alexander University in Erlangen Germany.

== Career ==
Plein enrolled in law studies at the University of Erlangen-Nuremberg before designing luxury dog beds, but did not complete his degree. He then shifted his career focus, eventually founding Philipp Plein International Group in Munich, Germany, in 1998.

Philipp Plein International AG
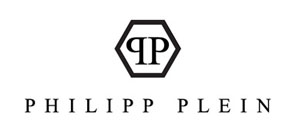
- Type: Aktiengesellschaft (AG)
- Industry: Consumer goods
- Founded: 1998 in Munich, Germany
- Headquarters: Lugano, Switzerland
- Key people: Philipp Plein (Founder and CEO)
- Products: Luxury clothing, shoes, accessories, furniture
- Number of employees: 800 (2011)
- Website: plein.com

Plein is listed as one of the 300 richest individuals in Switzerland in 2022 by Bilanz in their annual report.

== Brand ==
Plein's first collections were vintage military jackets which he embroidered with Swarovski skulls and sold at the Maison et Objet in Paris.

2008: the "Couture" collection was launched.

2009: the first store was opened in Monte Carlo, and the first commercial showroom was open in Milan.

2010: Plein boutiques opened in Vienna, Moscow, St. Tropez, Cannes, and Kitzbuhel in addition to the opening of a showroom in Düsseldorf.

2011: the Hong Kong showroom was inaugurated.

2012: ten boutiques were opened, in Marbella, Moscow Crocus, Baku, Milan, Dubai, St. Petersburg, Seoul, Macau, Amsterdam, and Berlin. Plein signed an agreement with the football team AS Roma to dress the team players starting with the 2012/13 season and continued to do so for four seasons.

2013: the opening of stores in Porto Cervo, Moscow, Paris, Miami, Casablanca, Courchevel, Kyiv, Hangzhou, Seoul, and New York.

2014: store openings include Hong Kong, Los Angeles, New York, Ibiza, Bodrum, Doha, London, and the first Plein duty free at the Vienna airport.

2019: the 20th anniversary of the Philipp Plein brand, with multiple special fashion shows.

2020: show was presented at Social Music City in Milan in June 2019, inspired by Mad Max Fury Road.

=== The Plein Group ===
The Plein Group is a Swiss-based luxury goods company. It owns the brands Philipp Plein, Billionaire, Plein Sport and Plein Golf. The brand Philipp Plein was founded in 1998 in Germany, Plein Sport in 2016. Billionaire was acquired in 2016. Plein Golf was launched in 2021.

=== Collaborations ===
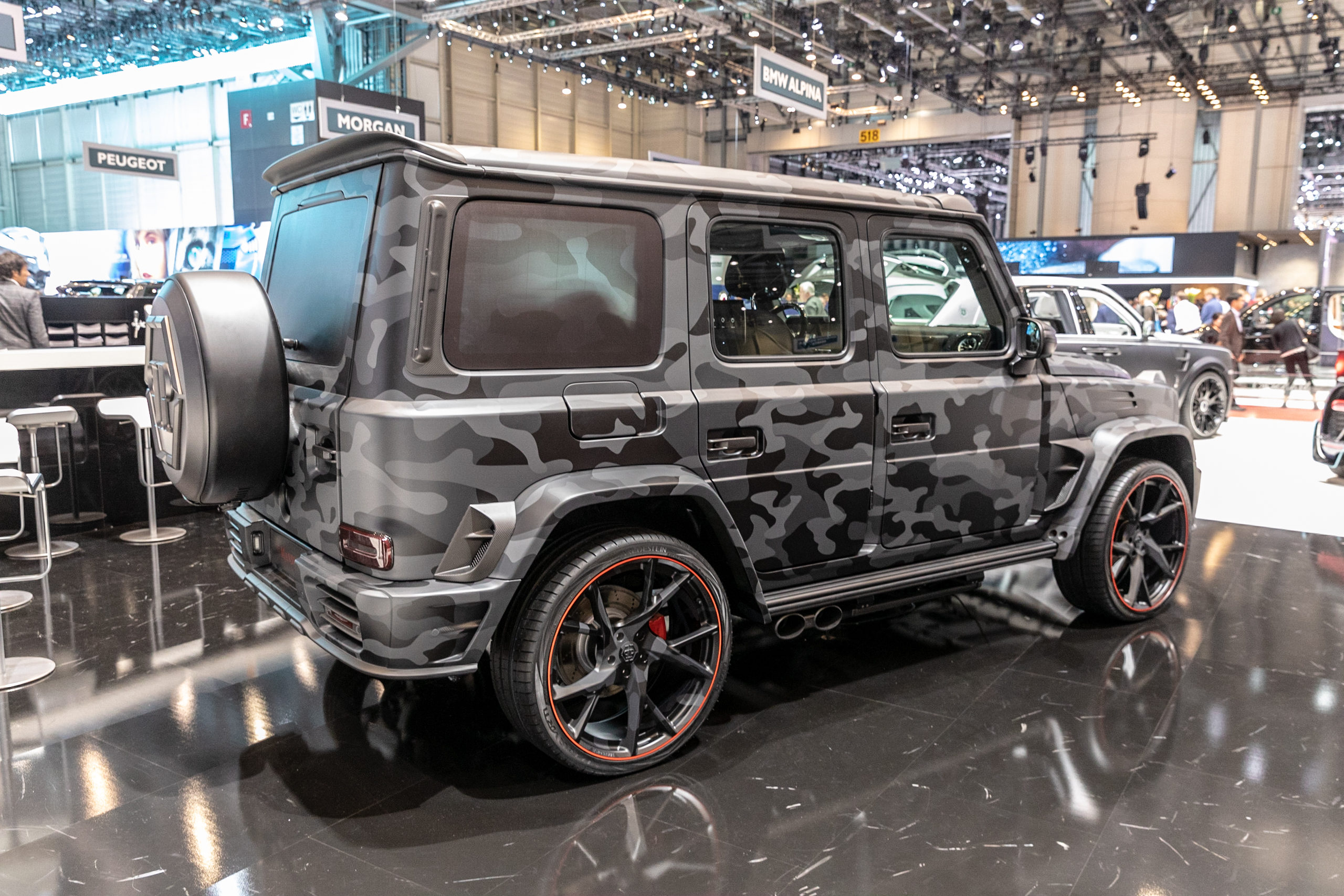
Mansory x Philipp Plein Star Trooper

Celebrities that have worked with Plein include Mischa Barton, Lindsay Lohan, Snoop Dogg, Rita Ora, Naomi Campbell, Iggy Azalea, Grace Jones, Theophilus London, Fergie, Chris Brown, Jeremy Meeks, Paris Hilton, Mauro Icardi, Alec Monopoly, and Floyd Mayweather.

In 2022, he released a shoe collaboration with Snoop Dogg called Philipp Plein X Snoop Dogg.

Plein told Women's Wear Daily about the sneaker collaboration with Snoop Dogg: "There are a lot of brands who collaborate with people just for money. It's nice to have a relationship with people who really like what you're doing. And the other way around.…That is what it's all about."

=== Cryptocurrency ===
Philipp Plein became the first major fashion brand to accept cryptocurrency as payment in July 2021.

=== NFT collection and Metaverse ===
Plein made his entrance into the Web3 space in collaboration with Portion, a blockchain auction house, as well as 3D visual artist, Antoni Tudisco.

The Plein Group has purchased a plot of land in the Decentraland metaverse, a 3D virtual reality platform. The Group bought the virtual estate for a price of US$1.4 million. Plein participated in Decentraland's Metaverse Fashion Week in 2022, showcasing a collection of NFT wearables created in partnership with Antoni Tudisco.

=== Real Estate ===
Plein has several homes in his real estate portfolio, including a $13 million dollar townhouse in New York City and a villa in Cannes, France that Plein has called "La Jungle du Roi" which was designed in collaboration with the Milan studio AquiliAlberg. In 2024, Plein opened a namesake hotel in Milan called The Plein Hotel, which has 20 hotel rooms and four restaurants (one restaurant is vegan).

==== CHÂTEAU FALCONVIEW ====
Plein is building a $70 million home in Bel Air, Los Angeles. Plein is building Chateau Falcon View on the 3.6 acres of land he purchased in 2014. The land was originally owned by American business magnate, Howard Hughes.

== Awards ==
- 2007 Winner of the GQ Awards National Brand of the Year
- 2008 Winner of the New Faces Award in the category Fashion
- 2014 Winner of the International Fashion Brand award at Esquire Middle East Man at his Best Fashion Awards
- 2016 Winner of GQ Germany Man of the Year Award in Fashion
- 2018 Winner of the GQ British Man of the Year - Brand of the year at the TATE modern museum in London
