= Abi Marquez =

Filipino vlogger and chef (born 2000)

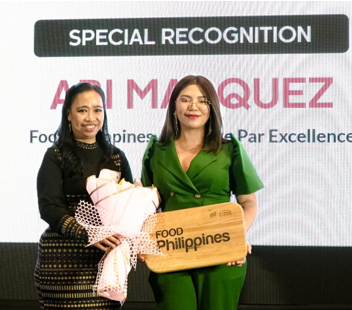
- Abi Marquez (right) winning an award at IFEX 2024
- Born: Abigail Fronda Marquez; June 16, 2000 (age 26); Santa Rosa, Laguna, Philippines
- Other name: Lumpia Queen
- Education: University of the Philippines Diliman (BS)
- Occupations: Vlogger; chef; musician
- Years active: 2022–present

TikTok information
- Page: Abi Marquez
- Followers: 3.9 million

YouTube information
- Channel: Abi Marquez
- Years active: 2012–present
- Genres: Cooking; vlog; music
- Subscribers: 1.51 million
- Views: 463 million
- Last updated: October 11, 2024
- Website: abimarquez.com

Abigail Fronda Marquez (Tagalog pronunciation: [maɾˈkes]; born June 16, 2000) is a Filipino social media personality, vlogger and celebrity chef. Dubbed as the "Lumpia Queen", she is widely recognized for her cooking content on TikTok and YouTube.

== Early life and education ==
Abigail Fronda Marquez was born in Santa Rosa, Laguna on June 16, 2000. She developed an interest in cooking at a young age, often preparing meals for herself when home alone, stating that she was never afraid to experiment in the kitchen. While growing up, selling food became a regular activity for her as she sold cookies and brownies that she learned to bake by following online recipes. Marquez credits her entrepreneurial spirit to her father, who ran a construction materials business, but claims her motivation for selling food stems more from her passion for cooking rather than from financial gain.

Marquez finished her bachelor's degree in Hotel, Restaurant and Institution Management (HRIM) at the University of the Philippines Diliman, graduating magna cum laude.

== Career ==
Around 2022, Marquez began posting videos on TikTok, featuring song covers and everyday life before entering the cooking genre. She has collaborated with various Internet celebrities including Nigel Ng, Chef Boy Lee, Jessica Lee, Andre Rush, Andy Hearnden, Doobydobap, Ninong Ry, Saweetie and Jujumao, as well as celebrity chef Gordon Ramsay.

On October 18, 2023, she appeared as a guest on the Philippine television morning show Unang Hirit where she shared her skills in cooking.

== Accolades ==
Marquez has received numerous accolades for her contributions to the culinary and digital content creation fields. She was named the People's Voice Winner in the Food & Drinks category at the 28th Annual Webby Awards and was awarded Foodie Creator of the Year at the TikTok Awards in 2023. In 2024, she received a bronze award for Best Campaign by a Mega Influencer at the Hashtag Asia Awards.

Marquez is a nominee for the 2024 James Beard Media Awards. She has also been recognized on the Forbes Asia "30 Under 30 Asia 2024" list and the Tatler Asia "Gen.T List of 2024".

== See also ==
- Ninong Ry
