= Jacob & Co =

American jewelry and wristwatch retailer

Jacob & Co.
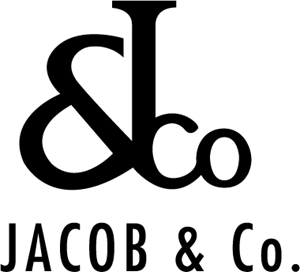
- Type: Private
- Industry: Jewelers, Luxury goods
- Founded: New York 1986
- Founder: Jacob Arabo
- Headquarters: New York City, United States
- Area served: Worldwide
- Key people: Jacob Arabo, Founder/Chairman; Benjamin Arabov, CEO
- Products: Jewelry, Watches
- Website: jacobandco.com

Jacob & Co. is an American privately held jewelry and wristwatch designer manufacturer and retailer founded in 1986 in New York by diamond designer Jacob Arabo. Its flagship boutique and corporate headquarters are located in Manhattan, New York City.

== History ==
After graduating early from a jewelry design course in 1981 in New York City, Jacob Arabo opened a small booth in New York City's Diamond District, where he began designing for jewelry labels and private clients. In 1986, Arabo opened his own company, called "Diamond Quasar," and began designing under his own label, named "Jacob & Co." The brand quickly gained popularity in New York and was able to expand its business to the luxury watchmaking industry in 2002.

By the early 1990s, he had established his own kiosk in New York's Diamond District and his innovative jewels caught the attention of the late rapper Notorious B.I.G., who gave him the moniker "Jacob the Jeweler," and introduced him to his entertainment friends.

The jeweler started collaborating with entertainers on custom designs. In the 1990s he was one of the first jewelers to create big diamond jewels for men, a trend that is mainstream today.

Hip-Hop stars who were Arabo's clients included Sean "Puffy" Combs, Biz, Jay-Z, Drake, 50 Cent, and Big Sean. His clientele expanded to various well-known entertainers and athletes, including Madonna, Rihanna, Pharrell, Elton John, David and Victoria Beckham, Jennifer Lopez, Salma Hayek, Sofia Vergara, Michael Jordan, and Mariah Carey.

With his success in the jewelry business, Arabo turned to watches. In 2002, he created a quartz watch collection called the Five Time Zone that combined bold primary colors and with multiple time zone technology that attracted men and women. It was inspired by his clients' jet-setting lifestyle and became both a fashion statement and a usable timepiece for those who travel. Naomi Campbell, Bono, Angela Bassett and Derek Jeter were among international celebrities wearing the watch.

=== Milestones ===
- 2002: Jacob & Co. unveiled the quartz-powered Five Time Zone watch collection with colorful, contemporary dials, interchangeable bezels and interchangeable straps. It was both a fashion statement and a usable world time zone watch.
- 2004: Jacob & Co. moved from the diamond district to a flagship boutique at 57th Street and Park Avenue.
- 2007: Arabo founded Jacob & Co. SA in Geneva, Switzerland, and introduced his first high-watchmaking timepiece, the Quenttin, the first watch to have a vertical tourbillon and a 31-day power reserve, at the time the world's longest power reserve.
- 2011: Jacob & Co.'s first brand ambassador, Chinese martial arts action star and director, Donnie Yen.
- 2012: Supermodel and actress, Milla Jovovich, became the next Jacob & Co. ambassador. The announcement was made at a reception during Baselworld 2012, the international watch and jewelry show in Switzerland.
- 2013: Jacob & Co. unveiled the Epic SF24, the first watch with a patented Split-Flap world time zone display. The same year football star, Cristiano Ronaldo, was named as a Jacob & Co.'s ambassador to promote the Ghost Five Time Zone timepiece collection.
- 2014: Jacob & Co. introduced the celestial themed Astronomia Tourbillon, unveiled to the watch industry trade at Baselworld 2013. It featured an exposed vertical movement with four arms that rotate around a central gear in 20 minutes. On one arm is a magnesium lacquered globe of the Earth and on the opposite arm is an exclusive 288-facet 1-carat diamond known as the "Jacob Cut" that represents the Moon. Each satellite rotates on its own axis. The other two arms have a triple-axis gravitational tourbillon and a dial display with a differential gear system that maintains the proper 12-6 o'clock position as the movement rotates within the case. Arabo called the Astronomia "revolutionary" and the "most important" Jacob & Co. watch.
- 2015: Jacob & Co. unveiled the Billionaire watch with a price tag of $18 million. The 18k white gold case and bracelet was covered with 260 carats of diamonds, with each individual gem weighing 3 carats each. It was purchased by professional boxer Floyd Mayweather in 2018.
- 2016: Jacob & Co. unveiled the Astronomia Sky, which introduced new complications of celestial inspiration to the Astronomia including a sidereal display, vertical month display, zodiac signs, day and night indication, as well as a celestial panorama, orbital second indication and a Jacob Cut diamond Moon; and the Twin Turbo, the first watch to combine a twin triple axis tourbillon and a minute repeater, in a distinctly shaped case with sports allure.
  - The same year the company opened a branded boutique in Dubai, UAE.
- 2017: Jacob & Co. unveiled the Astronomia Solar Planets Jewelry, which displays the precious planets of the Solar System as Jacob Cut, 288-facet gemstone spheres
- 2018: Jacob & Co. expanded upon the Twin Turbo with the Twin Turbo Furious, the first watch to combine a twin triple-axis tourbillon, decimal minute repeater, monopusher chronograph, and a time difference calculator.
  - The same year, the company opened a branded store in Geneva. and unveiled a new partnership with Lionel Messi, with limited-edition versions of the Epic X Chrono timepiece that incorporated Messi's professional signatures, such as the colors of the flag of Argentina, Messi's famous number 10, his stylized "M" logo, and his signature on the caseback.
- 2019: The year saw two more partnerships for Jacob & Co. The first was with French hyper sports car manufacturer, Bugatti, where they developed customized versions of the Jacob & Co. Epic X Chrono and Twin Turbo Furious timepieces. Then they collaborated on a new watch, released in 2020, the Bugatti Chiron Tourbillon, designed to emulate the Bugatti Chiron hyper sports car. Its movement includes a fully working engine animation designed to replicate the Bugatti W16 engine and a newly designed case inspired by the body of the Chiron.
  - The second partnership was with Paramount Pictures, where the two entities collaborated on the Godfather Musical watch. A built-in musical complication plays the first 120 notes of The Godfather theme song while the watch contains artistic replicas of details from the film.
  - The luxury brand also unveiled the Astronomia Casino, which features a fully operational miniature roulette wheel; and the Mystery Tourbillon, the first watch to feature two linked central triple axis tourbillons placed back to back in the center of a gem-encrusted dial.
  - In the same year, Jacob & Co. expanded its network of stores with points-of-sale in Beijing, Kuala Lumpur, and Bangkok. The following year Jacob & Co. opened a second boutique in Beijing.
- In 2020, Jacob & Co. added five partnerships. The first was with NBC/Universal where the two companies created the Opera Scarface Musical watch, which contains the music and iconography from the movie, Scarface.
  - The next was with menswear designer, Virgil Abloh, for a line of gold and diamond paperclip jewelry called "Office Supplies."
  - Then Jacob & Co. partnered with American skateboarding lifestyle brand, Supreme, for an exclusively designed Four Time Zone watch.
  - The fourth partnership was with UFC Champion, Khabib Nurmagomedov, for a line of Epic X Chrono watches that incorporated Khabib's professional signatures, including his undefeated record, his nickname "The Eagle" and his unique Papakha headpiece.
  - The fifth partnership was with explorer and environmental activist Johan Ernst Nilson. Together they launched the Astronomia Explorer, a watch that recreates Nilson's most iconic adventures with water from the North and South and a rock from the Himalayas with the Astronomia four-arm vertical movement and above a celestial base. The watch was designed to raise awareness of the dangers facing our planet.
- 2021: Jacob & Co. became the first luxury watch brand to sell an NFT with a digital version of the SF24 Tourbillon travel watch that fetched $100,000 and became the first luxury watch brand that accepts cryptocurrency.
  - The same year, Jacob & Co. released the Astronomia Maestro Worldtime, the first watch with a minute repeater carillon chiming complication and a Worldtime complication.
  - Jacob & Co. also unveiled three Twin Turbo Furious models with fully transparent sapphire crystal cases and a decimal minute repeater, the first watch to include these two distinct features.
  - The company partnered with Universal Pictures to produce the Fast & Furious Twin Turbo, which takes the timepiece created to emulate high-performance sports cars and merges it with the iconic symbols inspired by one of the most popular movie franchises of all time - Fast & Furious.
  - The same year, Jacob & Co. entered into an agreement with Warner Bros. Consumer Products and DC to produce a new collection of Batman-inspired timepieces.
  - Also in the same year, Jacob & Co. partnered with graffiti artist, Alec Monopoly to create the Astronomia Alec Monopoly, which places miniature sculptures of Monopoly's iconic pop culture creations.
- 2022: Jacob & Co. moved its Geneva boutique from the Four Seasons Hotel des Bergues to a two-story dedicated space at Rue du Rhône.
- 2023
  - Jacob & Co. released their most expensive watch to ever sell, the Billionaire Timeless Treasure which was worth $20 million at the time it was sold. The watch contains 880 carats of yellow diamonds.
  - In march, Jacob & Co. unveiled one of its most iconic pieces, the Casino Tourbillon which features a fully functioning roulette wheel.
  - Jacob & Co. introduced the Astronomia Revolution that featured a four-axis tourbillon that could rotate in 60 seconds.
- 2025:
  - German professional tennis player Alexander Zverev officially partnered with Jacob & Co. in January 2025, where he was introduced as a brand ambassador and debuted the partnership wearing the Epic X Titanium watch at the Australian Open.
  - In February 2025, Jacob & Co. opened its first store in Seoul, South Korea.
  - The company announced Jacob & Co. Beachfront Living by Ohana, a residential project in partnership with UAE-based Ohana Development, located in Al Jurf between Dubai and Abu Dhabi.
- 2026:
  - Jacob & Co. released the God of Time in mid-January, which set a world record for being the world's fastest tourbillon which moves one rotation every 4 seconds.

== Awards and recognition ==
In 2006, the Jacob & Co. Five Time Zone - "The World is Yours” watch won the Travel + Leisure Design Award.

== Book appearances ==
In 2022, Jacob's work was featured in Vikki Tobak's book, "Ice Cold. A Hip-Hop Jewelry History" (published by Taschen).
