= Mariia Grazhina Chaplin =

Ukrainian journalist, television presenter and producer

- Марія-Гражина Анатоліївна Чаплін
- Born: 30 November 1981 (age 44); Lviv, Ukrainian SSR, Soviet Union
- Occupations: journalist, model, producer, television presenter, publisher
- Beauty pageant titleholder
- Major competition: Miss Ukraine 2002

Mariia Grazhina Chaplin (Ukrainian: Марія-Гражина Анатоліївна Чаплін [укр]; born 30 November 1981) is an international journalist, producer, television presenter, holder of the title Miss Ukraine International 2002.

She is the founder of the World Influencer Business Awards (WIBA Awards). She is a publisher and producer of magazine cover stories in Times Monaco and L'Officiel magazines in Austria, Cyprus and Monaco.

== Early life ==
Mariia Grazhina Chaplin was born in Lviv, in the Ukrainian SSR (then part of the Soviet Union, now Ukraine). Mariia's father, Anatoly Chaplin, was a well-known Soviet scientist in the field of antenna theory and technology. Her mother, Khrystyna Blazhkevych, is a professor of Lviv National Music Academy. Chaplin's maternal grandfather Bohdan Blazhkevych (28 August 1912 – 10 October 1986) was a doctor of technical sciences, Honoured Scientist of the Ukrainian SSR. Her great-grandmother Blazhkevych Ivanna was a famous Ukrainian children's writer, public figure and educator.

== Education ==
In 1987–1995 she studied at the Solomiya Krushelnytska Lviv Musical School. She later studied at the Faculty of Law of the Western Ukrainian College.

In 2006, she graduated from the Griboyedov Institute of International Law and Economics.

In 2007, she graduated from the Institute of Television by Ostankino Technical Center.

== Career ==
=== Modelling business ===
In 2001, she won the Miss Western Ukraine pageant.

In 2002, she received the title of Miss Ukraine 2002. Subsequently, she produced competitions of various levels: "Miss Lviv" and "Miss Lviv TV" (2002–2015).

In 2008, she created a jewellery brand De Tiara together with Italian designers. It has several mono-brand boutiques with a main point of sale in Monte Carlo.

=== Journalism and production ===
After graduating from the Institute of Television in 2006, she began her career as a journalist and then as a host of television shows. Chaplin worked on the following Russian channels. During her work on TV, she recorded numerous interviews with media personalities, including: Elton John, Jennifer Lopez, Roberto Cavalli, José Carreras, Jessica Simpson, Marina Vlada and Roman Viktyuk.

Since 2015, she has been invited to host the Chik TV project in Monte Carlo, Monaco.

Also, Chaplin is a publisher and producer of magazine cover stories in Times Monaco. In 2020, she launched the L'Officiel, Cyprus edition.

=== World Influencers and Bloggers Association ===
In 2019, Chaplin founded the World Influencers and Bloggers Association. The headquarters of the award is located in Monaco. Chaplin became the CEO, producer, and inspirer of the event.
