= Miss Ukraine =

Beauty pageant

Miss Ukraine Міс України
- Formation: 1990
- Type: Beauty pageant
- Headquarters: Kyiv
- Location: Ukraine
- Members: Miss World; Miss International; Miss Earth; Miss Supranational
- Official language: Ukrainian
- Chairman: Yuri Ageev
- Website: Main site (in Ukrainian and Russian)

Miss Ukraine (Міс України or Панна України, Panna Ukrayiny) is a national beauty pageant in Ukraine.

Today it is one of the top three national beauty contests in Ukraine, others being Miss Ukraine Universe and Queen of Ukraine. Miss Ukraine serves as preliminary for the Miss World, Miss International and Miss Earth. Until 2006 it was the only national beauty contest, participants of which were qualifying for all the international pageant contests. Miss Ukraine still is the most prestigious and broadcast, however other concourses such as Miss Ukraine Universe with the help from Oleksandra Nikolayenko becomes well accepted also.

== Historical overview ==
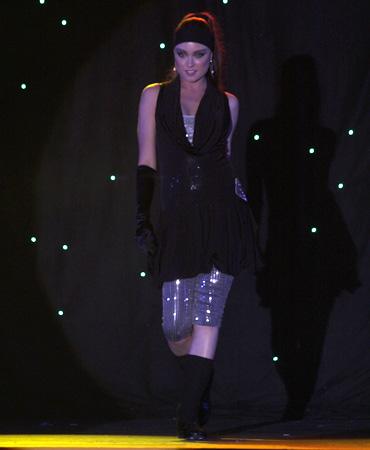
Iryna Zhuravska

The first national pageant Miss Ukraine became an 18-year-old university student Olha Ovcharenko/Rechdouni, who was also a semi-finalist in "Miss USSR" beauty pageant, and the first runner-up in 1990 Miss Kyiv beauty pageant. The participants of Miss Ukraine would qualify to represent Ukraine on the international level such as the Big Four Pageants, Miss Intercontinental, and continental beauty contests. Miss Universe contest usually was attended by the first runner-up of Miss Ukraine but sometimes the winner can also compete. The national beauty contest was reorganized after Miss Ukraine Organization lost its franchise to one of the former pageant winners Oleksandra Nikolayenko (2001). Since 2006, Oleksandra Nikolayenko organizes Miss Ukraine Universe concourse as qualification to Miss Universe independently.

The contest takes place out of 26 candidates from all the regions of Ukraine. The major regional contests are Miss Kyiv, Miss Odesa, Miss Donbass, Miss Western Ukraine and Bukovina, Miss Dnipropetrovsk, and others.

In 2002 Miss World 2002 was attended by the first runner-up of Miss Ukraine Iryna Udovenko as the winner of the national contest Yelena Stohniy was over the age restriction to participate on the international level.

Since 2005, Miss Ukraine has been broadcast every year by one of the leaders of the national TV-networks Inter.

In 2010, the Ukrainian National pageant took place on September 4. The winner received a crown estimated at 250,000 euros, a Renault car, and various make-up products.

=== Guests and jury ===
- Elizabeth Hurley
- Pamela Anderson
- Jean-Claude Van Damme
- Viktoria Tigipko, President of Odesa International Film Festival
- Chris Norman
- Ani Lorak
- Taisia Povaliy
- Verka Serduchka
- Natasha Koroleva

- Yuriy Pavlenko, Minister of Ukraine
- Julia Morley, President of Miss World
- Zhang Zilin
- Stas Piekha

=== Venues ===
- 2013: Fairmont Grand Hotel
- 2012: National Opera of Ukraine
- 2010-2011: Palace Ukraina

== Titleholders ==
=== Miss Ukraine World ===
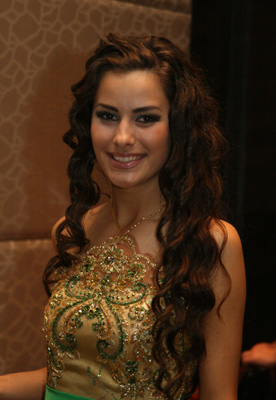
Lika Roman, Miss Ukraine 2007

Color key

- Declared as Winner
- Ended as runner-up
- Ended as one of the finalists or semifinalists

The winner of Miss Ukraine represents her country at the Miss World. On occasion, when the winner does not qualify (due to age) for either contest, a runner-up is sent. Traditionally there are titles for Winner, Runners-up and People's Choice Award.

Year	Miss Ukraine World	Town	Placement	Special Awards
2027	TBA	TBA	TBA	
2026	Valeriia Lisovska	Odesa	Top 20	
2025	Maria Melnychenko	Kyiv	Top 8	
2024	Due to the delay of Miss World 2023, no edition started in 2024			
2023	Sofia Shamia	Kyiv	Top 40	Continental Winner Beauty With A Purpose
2022	Miss World 2021 was rescheduled to 16 March 2022 due to the COVID-19 pandemic outbreak in Puerto Rico, no edition started in 2022			
2021	Oleksandra Yaremchuk	Vinnytsia	Unplaced	
2020	Due to the impact of COVID-19 pandemic, no pageant in 2020			
2019	Marharyta Pasha	Kharkiv	Top 40	(Top 40) Miss World Top Model, (Top 32) Miss World Sport, (Top 27) Miss World Talent
2018	Veronika Didusenko (Dethroned)	Kyiv	Did not compete	
2018	Leonila Huz (Assumed)	Kherson	Unplaced	
2017	Polina Tkach	Kyiv	Top 40	Top 30 Miss World Top Model, Top 20 Miss World Talent
2016	Oleksandra Kucherenko	Dnipro	Unplaced	
2015	Khrystyna Stoloka	Kyiv	Unplaced	
2014	Andriana Khasanshin	Lviv	Unplaced	
2013	Anna Zayachkivska	Ivano-Frankivsk	Top 20	3rd Runner-up Top Model, 2nd Runner-up Best Talent, Top 11 Beach Beauty
2012	Karyna Zhyronkina	Kharkiv	Unplaced	
2011	Yaroslava Kuryacha	Vinnytsia	Top 15	
2010	Kateryna Zakharchenko	Odesa	Unplaced	
2009	Evheniya Tulchevska	Dnipro	Unplaced	
2008	Iryna Zhuravska	Kyiv	Top 15	
2007	Lika Roman	Uzhhorod	Unplaced	
2006	Olha Shylovanova	Kharkiv	Unplaced	
2005	Yuliya Pinchuk	Novovolynsk	Unplaced	
2004	Olesya Matveyeva	Kyiv	Unplaced	
2003	Ilona Yakovleva	Kharkiv	Unplaced	
2002	Olena Stohniy	Kyiv	Unplaced	
2001	Oleksandra Nikolayenko	Odesa	Top 10	
2000	Olena Scherban	Nikopol	Top 10	Top 7 Model
1999	Olha Savinska	Kharkiv	Unplaced	
1998	Olena Spirina	Kharkiv	Unplaced	
1997	Kseniya Kuzmenko	Kharkiv	Unplaced	
1996	Natalya Shvachko	Yenakieve	Unplaced	
1995	Natalya Shvachiy	Kyiv	Unplaced	
1994	Terezia Lazarenko	Kyiv	Unplaced	
1993	Iryna Barabash	Kharkiv	Did not compete	
1992	Oksana Szabo	Kirovohrad	Unplaced	
1991	Olha Ovcharenko	Kyiv	Did not compete	
1990	Yuliya Shestopalova	Mykolaiv	Did not compete	

=== Miss Ukraine International ===
Color key

- Declared as Winner
- Ended as runner-up
- Ended as one of the finalists or semifinalists

The second title of Miss Ukraine represents her country at the Miss International. On occasion, when the winner does not qualify (due to age) for either contest, a runner-up is sent. The other delegates might compete after Miss Ukraine Organization cast their official recruitment.

Year	Miss Ukraine International	Town	Placement	Special Awards
2026	Daria Kharytonova	–	TBA	
2025	Anna Lutsenko	Uman	Unplaced	
2024	Sofia Zghoba	Lviv	Unplaced	
2023	Sofia Zghoba	Lviv	Did not compete	
2022	Olga Shamrai	Vinnytsia	Did not compete	
2021	Due to the impact of COVID-19 pandemic, no pageant in 2021			
2020	Due to the impact of COVID-19 pandemic, no pageant in 2020			
2019	Maryna Kiose	Odesa	Unplaced	
2018	Bohdana Tarasyk	Kryvyi Rih	Top 15	
2017	Kseniya Chifa	Zaporizhia	Unplaced	
2016	Viktoriya Kiose	Kyiv	Unplaced	
2015	Nina Horyniuk	Lviv	Unplaced	
2014	Sofia Oliynyk	Ternopil	Unplaced	
2013	Marharyta Horbyk	Kyiv	Unplaced	
2012	Yuliya Hershun	Dnipro	Unplaced	
2011	Oleksandra Krysha	Kyiv	Unplaced	
2010	Inna Bezobchuk	Kyiv	Unplaced	
2008	Yuliya Halychenko	Mariupol	Unplaced	
2007	Mariya Varyvoda	Kyiv	Unplaced	
2006	Inna Horuk	Kyiv	Unplaced	
2005	Mariya Zhukova	Kyiv	Top 12	
2004	Yuliya Kumpan	Kyiv	Unplaced	
2003	Veronika Bondarenko	Kyiv	Top 10	
2002	Mariia Grazhina Chaplin	Lviv	Unplaced	
2001	Natalya Bakulina	Kyiv	Top 10	
2000	Yana Razumovska	Kyiv	Unplaced	
1999	Liliya Zalunina	Kyiv	Unplaced	
1997	Yuliya Zharkova	Kyiv	Unplaced	
1996	Natalya Kozitska	Kyiv	Top 10	
1994	Olena Vladimirova	Kyiv	Unplaced	
1993	Natalya Vorona	Kyiv	2nd Runner-up	

=== Miss Ukraine Earth ===
Color key

- Declared as Winner
- Ended as runner-up
- Ended as one of the finalists or semifinalists

In 2013 to 2015 the winner of Queen of Ukraine represented her country at the Miss Earth. Began in 2016 the third title of Miss Ukraine represents her country at the Miss Earth. On occasion, when the winner does not qualify (due to age) for either contest, a runner-up is sent.

Year	Miss Ukraine Earth	Town	Placement	Special Awards
2026	Sofia Orel	TBA	TBA	
2025	Maria Zheliaskova	Odesa	Top 8	
2024	Did not compete			
2023	Anastasia Feier	Zakarpattia	Unplaced	
2022	Did not compete			
2021	Marina Litvin	Zaporizhzhia	Unplaced	
2020	Did not compete			
2019	Diana Shabas	Novovolynsk	Unplaced	(gold) Swimsuit (Water)
2018	Anastasiya Kryvokhyzha	Kyiv	Unplaced	
2017	Diana Mironenko	Odesa	Unplaced	(bronze) Resorts Wear (Group 3)
2016	Olena Beylova	Vinnytsia	Unplaced	(silver) Resorts Wear; Best Eco-Beauty Video (Top 3)
2015	Viktoriya Orel	Sumy	Top 16	(gold) Snowman Building, (gold) National Costume (Eastern Europe)
2014	Valeriya Poloz	Poltava	Unplaced	(silver) Evening Gown, (silver) Miss Friendship
2013	Anastasiya Sukh	Kyiv	Unplaced	(gold) Best in Swimsuit, (silver) Resorts Wear, (bronze) Most Child Friendly
2012	Kristin Sagan	Sumy	Unplaced	(bronze) Eco - Ambassadress
2011	Khrystyna Oparina	Kharkiv	Top 16	Miss Eco - Tourism
2010	Valentyna Zhytnyk	Kharkiv	Top 14	
2009	Karyna Holovata	Kyiv	Unplaced	
2008	Olha Bilousova	Kyiv	Did not compete	
2007	Halyna Andreyeva	Odesa	Unplaced	
2006	Karyna Kharchynska	Kyiv	Unplaced	
2005	Yevheniya Rudenko	Kyiv	Unplaced	Miss Talent
2004	Tetiana Rodina	Kyiv	Unplaced	
2003	Diana Starkova	Kyiv	Did not compete	

=== Miss Ukraine Supranational ===
Color key

- Declared as Winner
- Ended as runner-up
- Ended as one of the finalists or semifinalists

Year	Miss Ukraine Supranational	Town	Placement	Special Awards
2025	Kateryna Bilyk	Bohuslav	Top 12	Supra Fan Vote
2024	Marina Mizhnova	Ternopil	Unplaced	
2023	Alina Liashuk	Rivne Oblast	Unplaced	
2022	Diana Mironenko	Odesa	Unplaced	
2019	Ołena Łaszuk	Lutsk	Unplaced	
2018	Snizhana Tanchuk	Lviv	Top 25	
2016	Anastasia Lenna	Kyiv	Top 25	
2015	Alina Sapiha	Ternopil	Unplaced	
2014	Viktoriya Nimets	Uzhhorod	Unplaced	
2013	Kateryna Sandułowa	Kyiv	Top 20	
2011	Natalia Sitnikova	Kyiv	Unplaced	Miss Photogenic
2010	Alona Liashchuk	Kyiv	Unplaced	
2009	Oksana Moria	Dnipro	Miss Supranational 2009	Miss Photogenic

== Other contests ==
- Golden Crown of Ukraine (Золота Корона України) was conducted for the first time on November 6, 2004 at the Lviv Theatre of Opera and Ballet. The winner of the contest Olena Klepko from Poltava won the automobile Peugeot-206, a golden crown, and the title Miss Transport of Ukraine 2004. She also was allowed to participate at the Top Model of the World contest.
- In March 2010 there took place a Miss Bukovel contest as part of popularization of the Prykarpattya ski-resort Bukovel. The contest was won by a representative from Luhansk who later participated in Miss Ukraine 2010 as Miss Bukovel.
- Throughout Ukraine take place numerous other regular regional pageant contests among such are Transcarpathian Open ( 2010), Miss Kyiv City (2009), Miss Crimean Champaign (2010), Miss Sevastopol (2009, 2010), pageant contest of Chernihiv Region (1996), and others.
- In Chicago every year from about a thousand Ukrainian Americans one Miss Ukrainian Diaspora is chosen.

== See also ==
- Miss Ukraine Universe
- Miss Europe
- Miss Grand Ukraine
- Miss Ukraine 2017
