= Lika Roman =

Ukrainian model (born 1985)

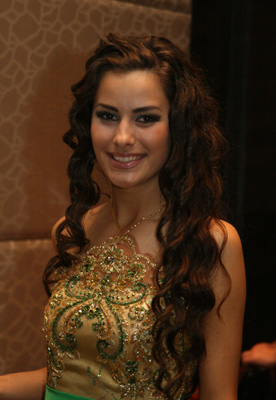
- Lika Roman in 2007
- Born: May 12, 1985 (age 41); Uzhhorod, Ukrainian SSR, Soviet Union
- Height: 1.74 m (5 ft 9 in)
- Beauty pageant titleholder
- Title: Miss Ukraine 2007
- Major competitions: Miss Ukraine 2007; Miss World 2007

Lika Roman (Ukrainian: Роман Ліка Вікторівна; born May 12, 1985) is a Ukrainian model, charity worker and beauty pageant titleholder who won Miss Ukraine 2007 and represented Ukraine at Miss World 2007 in Sanya, China.

She studied Political Science and Foreign Relations for her higher education at the branch of Kyiv Slavonic University in her city. Lika's father Viktor was a musician, and her mother Svitlana was a fashion designer. Lika used to work as a hairdresser while in school and spent her free time on dancing, playing piano and skiing.

In the winter of 2007, she toured the United States for the first time. She visited different TV channels, radio stations, newspapers and magazines. Also, she met with students and representatives of public organizations and took part in numerous talk-shows.

Currently, Roman resides in Kyiv, the capital of Ukraine. She said she likes its rhythm of life and enjoys being in the center of all events.

== Views and beliefs ==
Lika Roman is also well known for her strong moral views. Even before participation in "Miss Ukraine 2007" she denied a few interesting propositions from different model agencies, referring to conflict between principles of the modeling industry and her personal beliefs. As well after winning National Beauty contest she refused many propositions from major modeling agencies stating that model business doesn't interest her. Miss Ukraine 2007 is an Evangelical Christian, so she declared that she was a virgin and she was proud of it. Also Lika announced that she thought that sex before marriage is wrong and it is a sin and contradicts to her personal views.

== Charity activities ==
Even before participating "Miss Ukraine" Lika Roman was engaged in several charity activities in her native city Uzhhorod. After becoming the Miss Ukraine she continued her activities on the nationwide and international level. The number of themes interesting for Lika is quite wide but the main of them are preventing AIDS, purity before marriage, healthy lifestyle, ecology. She participates in number of talk-shows, conferences, seminars, discussions and interviews dedicated to these topics.

Preceded by Olha Shylovanova	Miss Ukraine; 2007	Succeeded by Iryna Zhuravska
