= Evheniya Tulchevska =

Ukrainian model (born 1990)

Evheniya Tulchevska Євгенія Тульчевська
- Born: January 1, 1990 (age 36); Leninsky city-district, Dnipropetrovsk, Ukrainian SSR
- Height: 1.78 m (5 ft 10 in)
- Beauty pageant titleholder
- Hair color: blond-brown
- Eye color: Gray
- Major competition: Miss Ukraine 2009

Evheniya Tulchevska (Ukrainian: Євгенія Тульчевська; born 1990 in Dnipropetrovsk, Ukrainian SSR) is a Ukrainian model and beauty pageant titleholder who represented her country at the Miss World 2009 pageant, which took place on December 12, 2009, in Johannesburg, South Africa.

At the time of becoming Miss Ukraine 2009, she was a student of the National Mining University of Ukraine.

Preceded by Iryna Zhuravska	Miss Ukraine; 2009	Succeeded by Kateryna Zakharchenko
