= Halyna Andreyeva =

Ukrainian actress

- Born: Odesa, Ukraine
- Modeling information
- Height: 173 cm (5 ft 8 in)
- Hair color: Blonde
- Eye color: Blue

Halyna Andreyeva (Ukrainian: Галина Андреєва, romanized: Halyna Andreieva; born 1985) is a Ukrainian actress, model and beauty pageant titleholder. she won the title of Miss Ukraine Earth 2007 and competed in Miss Earth 2007 pageant in Manila, Philippines. She was also the 2nd runner up and winner of the "People's Choice" award at the 2007 Miss Ukraine pageant.
