= Iryna Zhuravska =

Ukrainian model (born 1990)

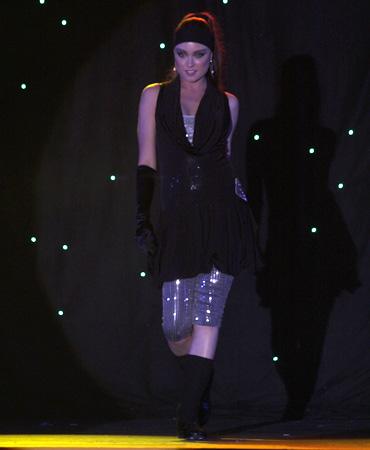
- Born: Iryna Zhuravska; January 14, 1990 (age 36); Kyiv, Ukrainian SSR, Soviet Union
- Height: 1.76 m (5 ft 9 1/2 in)
- Beauty pageant titleholder
- Title: Miss Ukraine 2008
- Hair color: Brown
- Eye color: Green
- Major competitions: Miss Ukraine 2008 (winner); Miss World 2008 (top 15)

Iryna Zhuravska (Ірина Журавська; born January 14, 1990) is a Ukrainian model and beauty pageant titleholder who represented her country in the Miss World 2008 pageant, which took place on December 13, 2008, in Johannesburg, South Africa. She placed among the top 15 semi-finalists in the pageant.

== Life and career ==
Zhuravska was born in Kyiv, Ukrainian SSR, Soviet Union (now Ukraine). At the time of her participation at the Miss World 2008 pageant, she was a second-year student at the Kyiv Pedagogical University, majoring in English.

As a model, Zhuravska has worked for many notable Ukrainian designers and appeared in TV commercials and music videos. She signed with KARIN MMG agency, owned Ukrainian model Vlada Lytovchenko, who also won the Miss Ukraine pageant. Zhuravska won the 2008 Miss Ukraine pageant and received a crown worth $500,000 and the right to represent Ukraine at Miss World. Previously, she won the titles Vice-Miss of Miss Donbas Open 2007, Miss Internet, and Miss Algora. She also was a runner-up of Miss World Talent in 2008.

Zhuravska is a close relative of the Kyiv mayor-deputy, Vitaliy Zhuravskyi, who later became a presidential adviser for Viktor Yanukovych and often attends the contest. There are some rumors from participants of the Miss Ukraine concourse that he might have influenced her award, such as from Miss Ukraine Universe 2006 Inna Tsymbalyuk who said that Zhuravska did not participate in qualifications, however, Vitaliy Zhuravsky denied any allegations.

Preceded by Lika Roman	Miss Ukraine; 2008	Succeeded by Yevhenia Tulchevska
