= Veronika Didusenko =

Ukrainian model (born 1995)

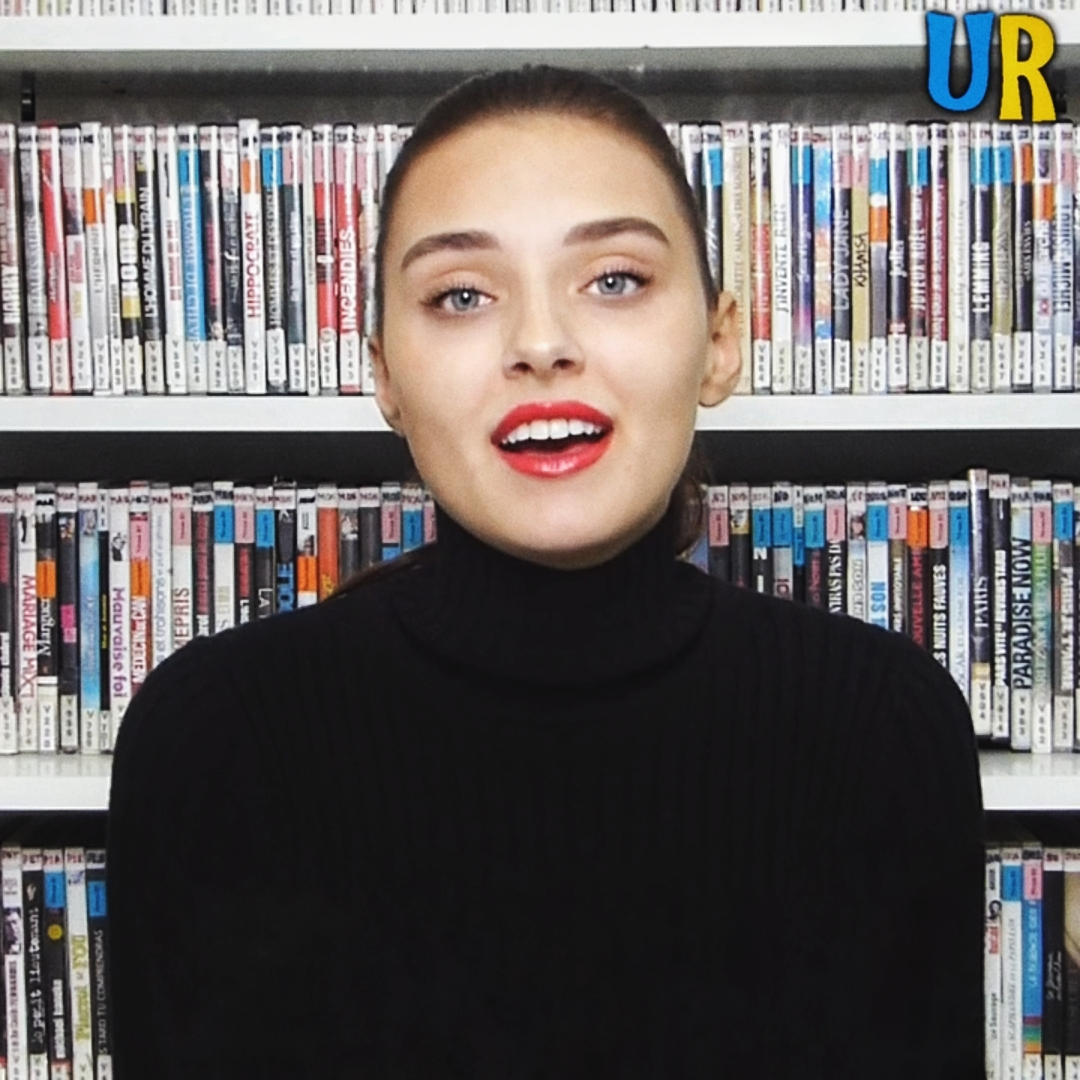
- Didusenko interviewed by Union Rings in 2018
- Born: Veronika Didusenko; 12 July 1995 (age 30); Kyiv, Ukraine
- Education: Taras Shevchenko National University of Kyiv (B.A.)
- Height: 1.75 m (5 ft 9 in)
- Title: Miss Ukraine 2018

Veronika Didusenko (Ukrainian: Вероніка Дідусенко; born 12 July 1995) is a Ukrainian model and beauty pageant titleholder who was crowned Miss Ukraine 2018. She was later stripped of her title and banned from competing in the Miss World pageant as she had been married at one point and had a five year old son.

== Early life and education ==
Didusenko was born and grew up in Kyiv, Ukraine, to a family of private entrepreneurs. From the early age, she practiced ballroom dancing and attended sports clubs. She studied in a state school in the Darnytskyi District of Kyiv, where she was a straight-A student.

In 2012, Didusenko went on to study Mechanics and Mathematics at the Taras Shevchenko National University of Kyiv where she defended her work "Pulse systems for solving linear integro-differential equations" and received a Bachelor's degree in 2016.

== Career ==
=== Modelling ===
Didusenko started her modelling career at the age of 18. She admitted that she “got into modelling by chance.” Her neighbour was a scout from Faces, one of the best model agencies in Ukraine. During the first five years of modelling career Didusenko spent a lot of time in Paris, Milan, and London working with the global brands such as Maison Margiela, Escada, Pat McGrath, John Galliano and others. She is represented by Women Management Paris and has worked at Paris Fashion Week. Her portfolio also includes working with Women Management Milano for the Escada fashion show. Veronika Didusenko is the celebrity face of Zarina, one of the biggest jewelry companies in Ukraine.

=== Miss Ukraine 2018 ===
In September 2018 Veronika Didusenko became the winner of the Miss Ukraine 2018 pageant, the preliminary stage competition to Miss World, Miss Earth and Miss International. The winner of Miss Ukraine goes on to represent her country at the Miss World. It is believed that apart from her appearance and personality, the jury members were impressed by her charity project Young Einsteins Ukraine.

However, only hours after receiving the title, Veronika Didusenko was disqualified by the Organising Committee, for the alleged reason of being a mother to a 4-year-old son and a divorcee. Didusenko was not the first mother to win the title Miss Ukraine, but the first to be disqualified. Explaining the reason for disqualification, the Organising Committee appealed to the rules of Miss World of which Miss Ukraine is a member and a national franchise. According to the rules of Miss World, contestants and titleholders “must not be married or have given birth to children”.

After disqualification, Didusenko gave a press conference where she claimed the rules of the Big Four international beauty pageants were discriminatory. The news of Didusenko’s disqualification was widely covered by the international media. The story was featured Fox News, Cosmopolitan, New York Post, BBC and Reuters. This gained Didusenko thousands of followers around the world and turned her into a media celebrity.

=== Young Einsteins Ukraine ===
The Young Einsteins is a charity project initiated and led by Veronika Didusenko. The project aims to identify orphaned children who are exceptionally inclined to mathematics and natural sciences, with the view to teach them a special curriculum to further develop their abilities and prepare them for university entrance.

== Personal life ==
Veronika Didusenko has a son, Alexander, from her first marriage. She was pregnant with her baby when she was 18.

Awards and achievements
Preceded by Polina Tkach	Miss Ukraine; 2018	Succeeded by Leonila Guz (Assumed)
