= Khrystyna Stoloka =

Ukrainian model (born 1997)

- Born: July 21, 1997 (age 29); Kyiv, Ukraine
- Occupation: Model in PM Models
- Height: 1.74 m (5 ft 8 1/2 in)
- Beauty pageant titleholder
- Title: Miss Ukraine 2015
- Hair colour: Brown
- Eye colour: Blue
- Major competitions: Miss Ukraine 2015 (Winner); Miss World 2015 (Unplaced)

Khrystyna Stoloka Ukrainian: Христина Столока born on 21 July 1997 in Kyiv Ukraine) is a Ukrainian model and beauty pageant titleholder who was crowned Miss Ukraine 2015 and represented her country at the Miss World 2015.

== Early life ==
Stoloka was born and raised in the capital city of Ukraine, Kyiv. She is a student of the National University of Food Technologies in Kyiv, and a model.

== Pageantry ==
=== Miss Ukraine 2015 ===
Stoloka was crowned as Miss Ukraine 2015 at Kyiv International Center of Culture and Arts on September 22, 2015. She was one of the 26 contestants participating on the final round of the contest.

=== Miss World 2015 ===
Stoloka represented her country at Miss World 2015.

Awards and achievements
Preceded by Andriana Khasanshin	Miss Ukraine; 2015	Succeeded by Oleksandra Kucherenko
