= Stepan (cat) =

Ukrainian cat

- Stepan on the cover of Times Monaco
- Species: Felis catus
- Sex: Male
- Born: November 16, 2008; Kharkiv, Ukraine
- Died: 20/11/2026 (aged 18-19); Kyiv
- Owner: Anna
- Stepan on Instagram

Stepan (Ukrainian: Степан, IPA: [steˈpɑn]; born November 16, 2008) is a Ukrainian striped cat who gained worldwide popularity on social media for his calm nature and jaded posture, making him Ukraine's most popular cat. He has more than one and a half million followers on Twitter and Instagram. Since 2019, Stepan also has an account on the TikTok network. By November 2024 Stepan had 1.6m followers on Instagram. In 2022 Stepan's Instagram page helped raise almost 15,000 euros in humanitarian aid for Ukraine. On 20 November 2026, his owner announced that he died at the age of 18.

== Biography ==
Stepan was born in 2008 in Kharkiv. Stepan's owner, Anna, found him when he was little. He has since lived with her in a high-rise apartment building in Saltivka, Kharkiv. In 2020, during the quarantine period imposed following the COVID-19 pandemic, Anna recorded the first video of Stepan, and it received several million views. Since then, Anna has been posting new photos and taking pictures of Stepan almost every day, always coming up with new images for him. Initially Anna posted in Russian.

According to The Moscow Times' YouTube channel, by July 2021, Stepan's fame had crossed the country's borders, with Stepan "capturing the heart" of the Russian Internet.

In November 2021, Britney Spears drew attention to Stepan in her post. The publication had more than 1.1 million likes and almost nine thousand comments. Soon after, the Italian fashion house Valentino published an ad for one of its handbags, featuring the Stepan.

== Russian invasion of Ukraine ==
On February 24, 2022, Anna and Stepan were surprised by the Russian invasion of Ukraine, during which bombings destroyed parts of Kharkiv, including residential neighborhoods, causing dozens of deaths and injuries. After the invasion began, Stepan's social media accounts confirmed that both Stepan and Anna survived the bombings, finding themselves in a shelter. Stepan's photos have been accompanied by photos of the destruction caused by Russian forces and messages calling for an end to the invasion and a return to peace. After Stepan and his family escaped to Poland, the World Influencers and Bloggers Association helped them find a safe house in France.

Following the Russian invasion the social media posts of Stepan switched to Ukrainian. Stepan's owner Anna told the BBC: "We've all changed mentally after seeing what sort of thing this 'Russian world' (a concept of a cultural and political space promoted by Russia) really is."

In August 2022, Anna adopted a kitten, Stephania; she is a tabby and looks a lot like Stepan. In November of that year, Stepan was appointed as an "ambassador" by the Ministry of Culture and Information Policy as part of their "Save Ukrainian Culture" campaign.

In 2022 Stepan's social media pages helped raise almost 15,000 euros for food, medicine and other care for other Ukrainian animals who suffered in the war.

According to his Instagram account, Stepan returned to his native Kharkiv.

In August 2023, Stepan had 1.3 million followers on Instagram.

In 2024, Anna announced that Stepan had fallen ill due to stress following a Russian attack on Kharkiv on 23 January and was receiving medications. In March, Anna announced that they had relocated to Germany with her cats.

== See also ==
- List of individual cats
