= Jacob Arabo =

American designer (born 1965)

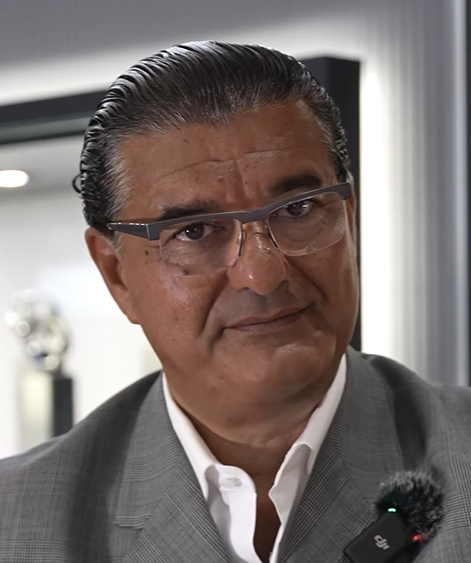
- Arabo in 2023
- Born: Yakov Arabov; June 3, 1965 (age 61); Tashkent, Uzbek SSR
- Other name: Jacob the Jeweler
- Occupations: Jewelry and watch designer
- Known for: Jacob & Co
- Spouse: Angela (m. 1989)

Jacob Arabo (born Yakov Arabov; June 3, 1965) is an American jeweler and watchmaker who founded Jacob & Company in 1986 and grew it to become an international luxury brand. He began strictly as a jeweler with designs that appealed to celebrities who became regular customers.

== Early life ==
Arabov was born in Tashkent, Uzbek SSR (today in Uzbekistan) as the youngest of five children and the only male, to a Bukharian Jewish family.

As a child, he helped his sisters repair their jewelry. He credits taking a photography course with giving him an understanding of design principles.

His interest in watches began at the age of 13 when his father gave him a world time watch. A year later he had a part-time job assisting a watchmaker. According to Arabo, he "loved all the tiny parts and gears" and was "enthralled by his [father's] ability to breathe life into a movement, to assemble it and then have it actually tell time."

In 1979, at the age of 14, he and his family immigrated to New York City. They lived in Forest Hills, Queens, and he attended Forest Hills High School.

His father worked several jobs but had difficulty earning enough to support his family. Because of family difficulties, at the age of 16, Arabo discontinued his formal education before completing high school and enrolled in a six-month jewelry-making course. He graduated four months later. He found work at a local wholesale jewelry factory that made mass-market pieces earning $125 a week. By the time he was 17 years old he was designing his own pieces at night in his bedroom while working at the factory during the day.

== Career ==
As a teenager, Jacob Arabo was working for a traditional jewelry manufacturer in the New York City Diamond District on 47th Street and making his own jewelry in his family's house at night. Eventually, he moved his makeshift workshop to a permanent factory in the Diamond District. At this point, Arabo specialized in gold jewelry, creating his own designs. However, he was still working for clients within the jewelry industry by producing traditional jewels for distributors and retailers.

In 1986, at the age of 21, Arabo founded the retail jewelry company Diamond Quasar, doing business under the Jacob & Co brand making his own designs for private clients. By the early 1990s, he had established his own kiosk in New York's Diamond District. His innovative pieces caught the attention of the late rapper Notorious B.I.G., who gave him the moniker "Jacob the Jeweler," and introduced him to his entertainment friends. The moniker has also appeared in rap songs by Jay-Z, Nas and other rappers.

Arabo started collaborating with entertainers on custom designs. In the 1990s, he was one of the first jewelers to create big diamond jewels for men, a trend that is mainstream today.

Hip-hop artists who were Arabo's clients included Sean "Puffy" Combs, Biz Markie, Jay-Z, Drake, 50 Cent, and Big Sean. Other clients include various prominent entertainers and athletes, including Madonna, Rihanna, Pharrell, Elton John, David and Victoria Beckham, Jennifer Lopez, Salma Hayek, Sofia Vergara, Michael Jordan, Mariah Carey and Canelo Álvarez.

Arabo created a quartz watch collection called the Five Time Zone in 2002, which combined bold primary colors with multiple time zone technology and was worn by both men and women. Naomi Campbell, Bono, Angela Bassett, Derek Jeter, and other celebrities have worn watches from the collection. One of the features of the Five Time Zone Watch was its interchangeable bezel, in which a stainless steel bezel can be replaced with a bezel paved with diamonds. The watch was highly customizable, and Arabo made several versions of the watch for his clients, including Leonardo DiCaprio for his charity and designer Virgil Abloh.

Arabo moved from the Diamond District to a mine-inspired flagship boutique at 57th Street and Park Ave in 2004.

In 2007, Arabo founded Jacob & Co. SA in Geneva, Switzerland, and introduced his first high-watchmaking timepiece, the Quenttin. It was the first watch to have a vertical tourbillon and a 31-day power reserve, at the time the world's longest power reserve.

In 2013, Arabo created the Epic SF24, a two-time zone watch that uses a patented fully mechanical split-flap system to display the time in 24 cities around the world. Inspired by the old split-flap board at airport and train terminals, it was the first time a system like this was used in a mechanical watch.

Arabo's company Jacob & Co. released the celestial-themed Astronomia Tourbillon in 2013, initially introduced at Baselworld 2013. By 2016, there were 99 iterations of the Astronomia Tourbillon.

In 2019, Arabo was invited to create the crown and serve as a judge for the Miss World America 2019 pageant. The crown was crafted of 18k white gold and adorned with 164 carats of Colombian emeralds and 95 carats of diamonds.

== In popular culture ==
Arabo was featured in the 2004 video game Def Jam: Fight For NY, in which the players' hip-hop characters compete to earn cash with which they can buy jewelry from Jacob the Jeweler.

He is also well known in the entertainment industry for his unique jewelry designs and is mentioned in several hip-hop songs as "Jacob the Jeweler" or just "Jacob".

Arabo was featured in a 2016 cover story in the watch magazine Revolution, titled "The Man Who Would be King." He was also featured in the watch magazine GMT in a 2018 story titled "Jacob & Co.: Spectacular Horology."

Arabo also appeared in the Explained episode "Diamonds", part of a 2019 Vox and Netflix TV documentary series.

In 2020, Arabo made a cameo appearance in Drake's "When To Say When & Chicago Freestyle" music video.

In 2023, Arabo made an appearance during episode 6 of the 14th season of the reality show The Real Housewives of New York City, where Arabo was seen consulting cast member Erin Lichy on her jewelry.

== Personal life ==
Arabo married his wife, Angela—who is also Bukharian Jewish—when he was 24. They have three sons. The couple lives in Forest Hills, Queens.

== Legal issues ==
Arabo was arrested in 2006 on accusations that he and others conspired to launder about $270 million in drug profits for the Black Mafia Family. These charges were eventually dropped; and, in June 2008, Arabo pleaded guilty to a lesser charge of falsifying records and giving false statements as part of a deal he struck with federal prosecutors. The judge sentenced Arabo to a 2.5-year sentence in federal prison and ordered him to pay a $50,000 fine and an additional $2,000,000 as forfeiture to the US government. In a statement to the presiding judge, Arabo expressed that he felt shame for what he did, stating: "I feel ashamed that I broke the laws of this country, a country that has been so good for me."
