= Doobydobap =

South Korean YouTuber and cook (born 1997)

- Born: Choi Eun-seo; 13 December 1997 (age 28); South Jeolla Province, South Korea
- Education: Cornell University
- Years active: 2020–present

TikTok information
- Page: doobydobap
- Followers: 3.2 million

YouTube information
- Channel: Doobydobap
- Genres: Food; vlog
- Subscribers: 4.48 million
- Views: 1.75 billion
- Last updated: 8 August 2026
- Website: doobydobap.com

Choi "Tina" Eun-seo (Korean: 최은서; born 13 December 1997) also known as Doobydobap, is a South Korean YouTuber and cook. She is known for her promotion of Korean recipes through her content. In 2023, Choi opened a restaurant in Seoul, Mija Seoul; it closed in 2024.

== Early life ==
Choi was born on 13 December 1997, in South Jeolla Province, South Korea. She later moved to Calgary, Alberta from the second to fifth grades and attended an international school on Jeju Island before going to boarding school in Connecticut when she was fourteen. She learned to cook Korean food after not having it readily available to her, as the nearest Korean restaurant from her school was a forty-minute drive away. Choi graduated from Cornell University in May 2020, majoring in food science. She had initially wanted to become a pharmacist, but sought a job as a recipe developer after graduating.

== Career ==
Choi created her YouTube channel in 2020, although she did not begin posting until February 2021. She originally began uploading videos to create a digital portfolio for companies to hire her. After graduating in May 2020, during the COVID-19 pandemic, Choi moved to London to live with her boyfriend and was unable to find a job. She later broke up with her boyfriend and moved back to Korea in July or August 2021. Her first video was of a chicken wing bento box. Choi's channel name, Doobydobap, comes from her nickname, the Korean name for the green Teletubby, Dooby, and "bap", the Korean name for cooked rice.

In May 2023, Choi opened Mija Seoul, a farm-to-table Korean restaurant in Seoul, with her boyfriend, Danish chef Kevin Kroløkke. Kroløkke had previously worked at the Michelin Starred Restaurant Relæ for ten years. The restaurant closed in February 2024.
