= Kateryna Osadcha =

Ukrainian journalist (born 1983)

- Катерина Осадча
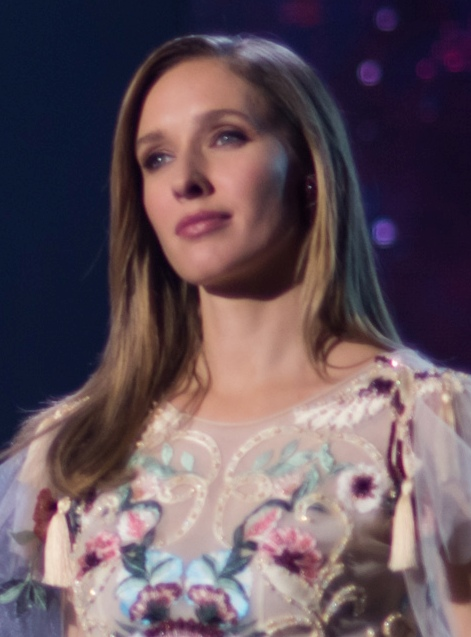
- Osadcha in 2017 as a jury of "The Voice Kids"
- Born: 12 September 1983 (age 42); Kyiv, Ukrainian SSR, Soviet Union
- Citizenship: Ukraine
- Education: University of Kyiv
- Occupation: Journalist
- Television: "Social life", "The Voice"
- Spouse: Oleh Polishuk (m. 2001–2004) Yuriy Horbunov (m. 2017)
- Children: 3

Kateryna Osadcha (Ukrainian: Катерина Осадча; born 12 September 1983) is a Ukrainian journalist, host of the programs "Social Life", "The Voice of Ukraine" (1–3, 6–8 seasons) and "The Voice Kids" on the TV channel "1+1".

== Biography ==
She was born on September 12, 1983, in Kyiv. Her father — Oleksandr Osadchyi, was a Director of Kyivprylad factory, while her mother is a housewife. She also has a younger brother.

In addition to school, Osadcha was engaged in music and dance and was a member of the choreographic ensemble "Little Falcons". At the age of thirteen, she began her professional modeling career and graduated from the Bagira Agency's modeling school. At the age of 14, after finishing ninth grade, she went to film in Tokyo for three months. Later there were shootings in Germany, England and France. Osadcha passed her final exams at school externally due to a busy filming schedule.

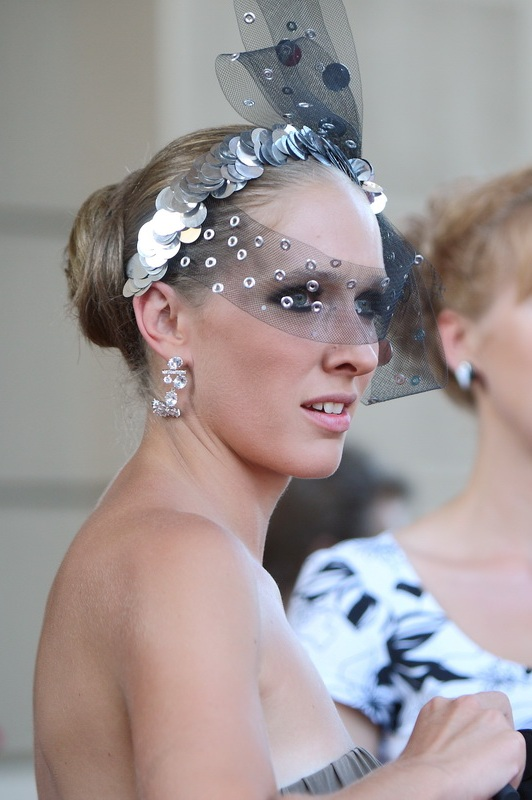
Osadcha at 1st Odesa International Film Festival

At the age of 18, Osadcha finished her modeling career and returned to live in Ukraine. She married Oleh Polishchuk, a Member of Parliament from the Green Party, and in 2002 gave birth to a son, Ilya. Due to poor knowledge of the Ukrainian language, four months after the birth of a child she began to work with a teacher to practice the skills of speech and diction. She graduated in absentia from the Faculty of History of the University of Kyiv.

The first experience of television journalism appeared after working as a freelance correspondent for the First National Channel (in 2015 was renamed to UA:First). In 2005, Osadcha passed the casting and became the host of the project "Social life" on the TV channel "Tonis". In 2007, she became the host of the program "Social Life" at the UA:First. In August 2008, the program began airing on 1+1.

On October 31, 2017, Osadcha became a member of the jury "Model XL" along with designer Andre Tan, choreographer Vlad Yama and Latvian model Tetyana Matskevych.
