= CZN Burak =

Turkish internet personality and restaurateur (born 1996)

Burak Özdemir
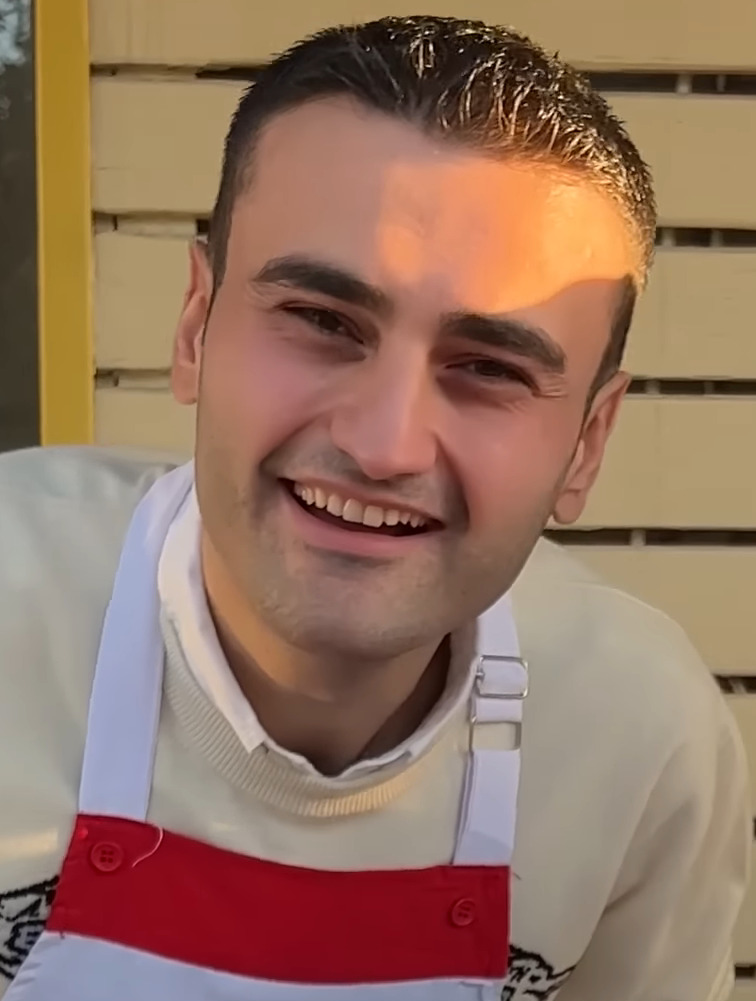
- Özdemir in 2022
- Born: Burak Özdemir; 24 March 1996 (age 30); Yayladağı, Turkey
- Occupation: Restaurateur
- Website: www.cznburak.tr

Burak Özdemir (born 24 March 1996), also known as CZN Burak, is a Turkish internet personality, chef, and restaurateur. His nickname CZN originates from a frequent mispronunciation of the Cinzano, the name of his father's textile shop in Laleli, Istanbul.

== Entrepreneurship ==
Özdemir owns the CZN Burak and Chef Burak chain of restaurants, which consists of eleven branches: Vadistanbul Mall and Etiler in Turkey and overseas branches in Dubai, Uzbekistan, Medina, China, Bradford, Birmingham, Doha, Egypt, Türkmenistan, Iraq, Jordan and Bahrain.

In 2023, Özdemir sued his father Ismail Ozdemir, claiming that he had embezzled funds from the Hatay chain to purchase luxury cars and real estate, and improperly sold licensing rights to his restaurant name.

== Popularity ==
Özdemir's preparation and presentation of oversized versions of Turkish recipes while smiling to the camera have made him an Internet celebrity on platforms such as Instagram, YouTube and TikTok. He sometimes gives the food made on camera to economically challenged people and those needy of food.
