= Alec Monopoly =

American street artist and DJ (active since 2010)

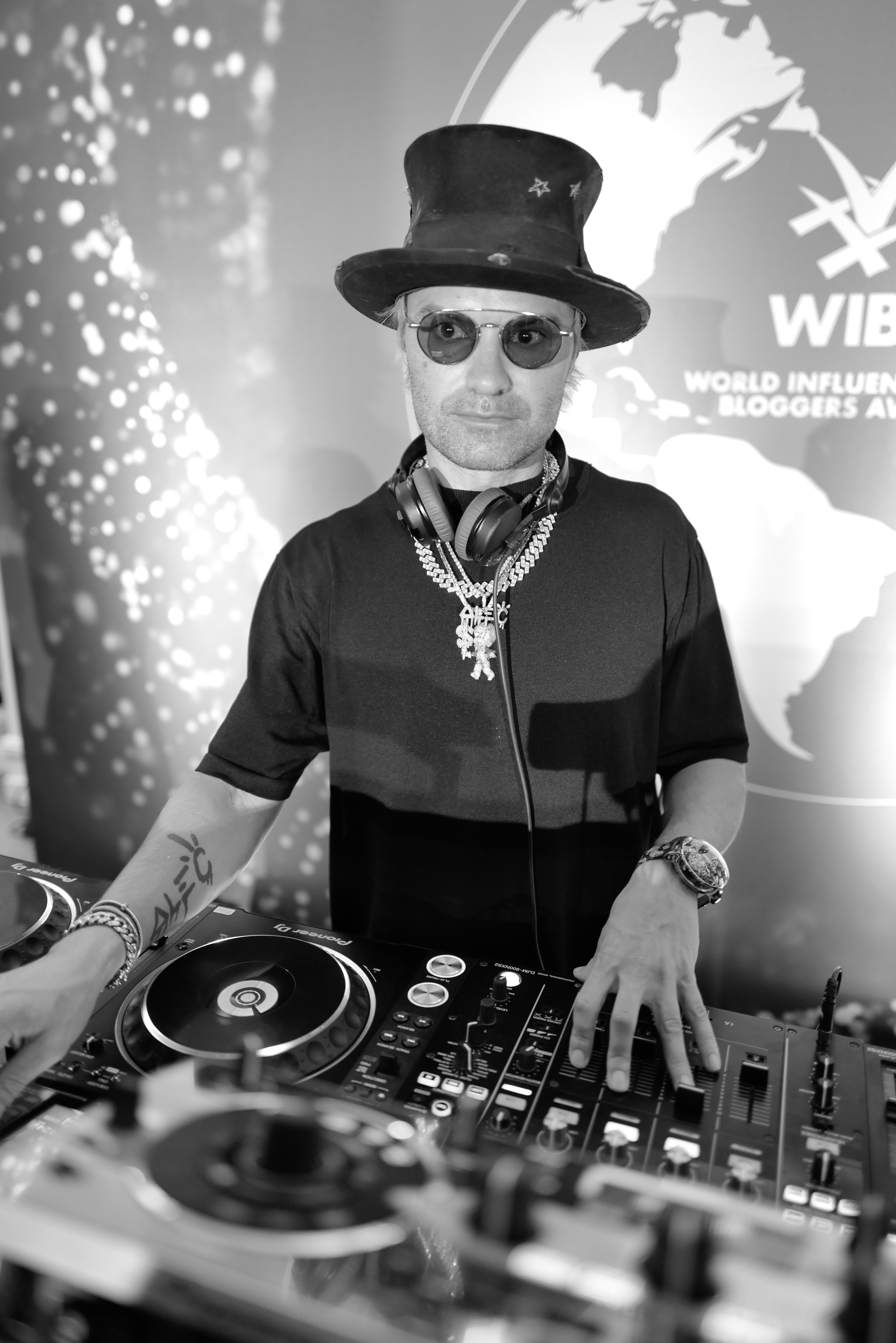
- Alec Monopoly Wiba Award Cannes 2022
- Born: Alec Andon; New York City, New York, U.S.

Alec Andon, professionally known as Alec Monopoly, is a street artist, and DJ, originally from New York City. His signature is covering his face with his hand or using a medical face mask to hide his facial identity. He is noted for using the Parker Brothers board game Monopoly character "Mr. Monopoly" (today part of the Hasbro brand). The artist has also worked in the urban environments of Miami, Los Angeles, Europe, Mexico, and throughout Asia using varied materials (including stencils, spray paint, epoxies, varnishes, and newspapers) to depict various iconic pop culture characters. He also is a brand ambassador with Swiss watchmaker TAG Heuer and created a mural live, on red carpet for the 2013 film Justin Bieber's Believe. Monopoly's work has been purchased by such notable people as Philipp Plein, Miley Cyrus, Robin Thicke, Snoop Dogg, Seth Rogen, Adrien Brody, and Iggy Azalea, among others.

== Life and work ==
Alec Monopoly grew up in New York and moved to Los Angeles in 2006. He found working there was easier because of the many billboards in the city and because of the more exclusive nature of New York City's art scene. He is of Armenian descent.

Monopoly is best known for his tuxedoed and top-hatted graffiti characterization of Monopoly Man, an idea originally inspired by the stockbroker Bernie Madoff. According to John Wellington Ennis writing for the Huffington Post, "In an era of billion dollar bailouts for banks that already own the country and moguls decrying regulation as un-American, the re-contextualization of the childhood symbol of success and wealth almost needed no explanation." Monopoly also pastes up images of Jack Nicholson.

In November 2010 he had his first solo gallery show in New York City. In December 2010, he took part in an exhibition at the Mondrian Hotel as part of Art Basel Miami Beach. In 2013, he hosted a yacht party at Art Basel Miami Beach, sponsored by Samsung. In 2021, Monopoly collaborated with the media company Barstool Sports to sell exclusive merchandise in an effort to raise money for the Barstool Fund which is raising money for small businesses as a part of a COVID-19 relief effort.

Since the late 2010s, Monopoly has been represented by Eden House of Art, an international contemporary art gallery that exhibits modern, pop, and street art internationally.

In July 2021, Alec Monopoly collaborated with Jacob & Co. to create the Astronomia Alec Monopoly watch, a $600,000 limited-edition timepiece with only nine pieces produced. The watch features hand-painted miniatures of Monopoly's iconic characters, like “The Monopoly Man,” set within the Astronomia’s intricate four-arm movement and sapphire crystal case. This marked Monopoly’s first partnership with Jacob & Co., blending his vibrant street art with luxury watchmaking.

In November 2024, Alec Monopoly collaborated with Jake Paul for a high-profile boxing match against Mike Tyson, streamed on Netflix. Monopoly’s artwork, featuring his signature “Mr. Monopoly” character holding a bag of cash, was prominently displayed on Paul's boxing shorts, part of an outfit reported to be one of the most expensive in sports history.

Alec Monopoly presented “Flying to a Happy Place,” an immersive exhibition spanning multiple locations, featuring large-scale installations and life-size jet sculptures during Art Basel Miami 2025.

== Filmography ==
- Pay 2 Play: Democracy's High Stakes, 2014 documentary film
