= Miss Ukraine Universe 2009 =

- Date: 29 February 2009
- Venue: Freedom Concert Hall, Kyiv, Ukraine
- Winner: Khrystyna Kots-Hotlib; Donetsk Oblast

Miss Ukraine Universe 2009, the 14th edition of the Miss Ukraine Universe pageant, was held in Freedom Concert Hall in Kyiv. Eleonora Masalab of Kharkiv Oblast crowned Khrystyna Kots-Hotlib of Donetsk Oblast as her successor at the end of the event.

== Results ==
Result	Contestant
Miss Ukraine Universe 2009	Khrystyna Kots-Hotlib
1st Runner-Up	Antonina Paperna
2nd Runner-Up	Anna Lapenko
3rd Runner-Up	Ekaterina Antonenko

== Judges ==
- Sergei Tsiupko
- Yaroslav Gres
- Sergei Zhigunov
- Svetlana Svetlichnaya
- Alexandra Ruffin
- Eric Trump
