= Diana Harkusha =

Ukrainian model

- Born: Diana Ruslanivna Harkusha; 5 July 1994 (age 32); Kharkiv, Ukraine
- Other name: Diana Garkusha
- Height: 177 cm (5 ft 9 1/2 in)
- Beauty pageant titleholder
- Title: Miss Ukraine Universe 2014
- Hair color: Blonde
- Eye color: Blue
- Major competitions: Miss Ukraine Universe 2014 (Winner); Miss Universe 2014 (2nd Runner-Up)

Diana Ruslanivna Harkusha (Ukrainian: Діана Русланівна Гаркуша, born 5 July 1994), sometimes transliterated as Diana Garkusha, is a Ukrainian model and beauty pageant titleholder who won Miss Ukraine Universe 2014. She later represented Ukraine at the Miss Universe 2014 pageant, where she placed as the second runner-up.

== Early life ==
In 2011, Harkusha attends the Yaroslav Mudryi National Law University. She graduated from the university in March 2017. Prior to her participation in Miss Ukraine Universe and Miss Universe, she won Miss Artek in 2008, Etnokoroleva Slobozhanshchiny (Note: Ethno-Queen of Slobozhanshchyna) in 2011 and Miss Kharkiv in 2012. In 2022 she graduated from The Lee Strasberg Theatre & Film Institute, Los Angeles.

== Pageantry ==
=== Miss Ukraine Universe 2014 ===
Harkusha competed in Miss Ukraine Universe 2014 represented Kharkiv. The pageant was held on 6 June 2014. At the end of the event, she was announced as the second runner-up.

=== Miss Universe 2014 ===
The original winner, Anna Andres, resigned and refused to represent the country for personal reasons. Therefore, Harkusha was selected to represent Ukraine at Miss Universe 2014 pageant. She then became the second runner-up of the pageant, making it the third time that Ukraine has ever made it to the Top 5.

== Notes ==
Awards and achievements
Preceded by (Ecuador) Constanza Báez	Miss Universe 2nd Runner-Up; 2014	Succeeded by (United States) Olivia Jordan
Preceded by Olga Storozhenko	Miss Ukraine Universe; 2014	Succeeded by Anna Vergelskaya
