= Trostianets, Vinnytsia Oblast =

Rural locality in Vinnytsia Oblast, Ukraine

Trostianets Тростянець
- Rural settlement
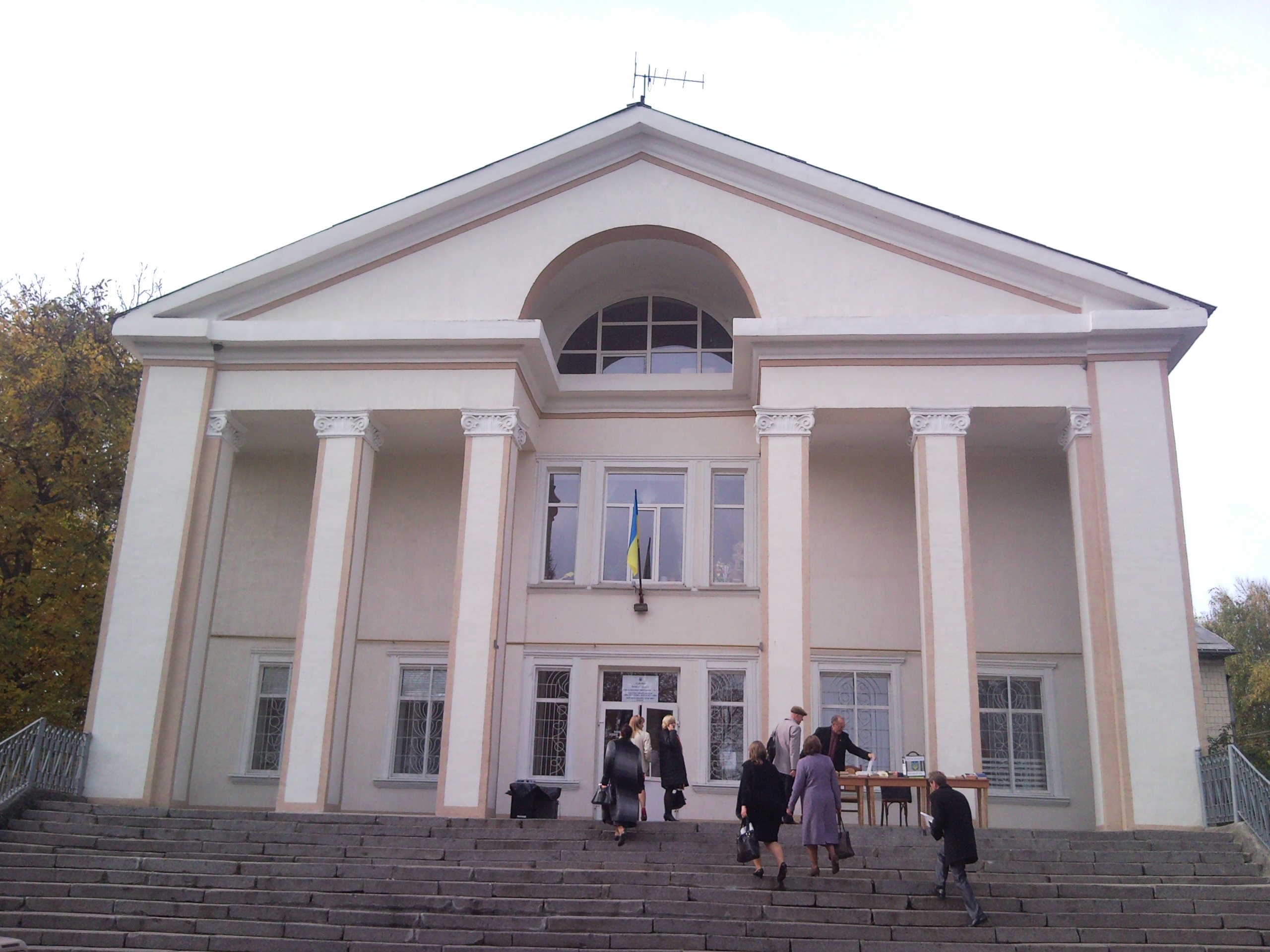
- House of Culture

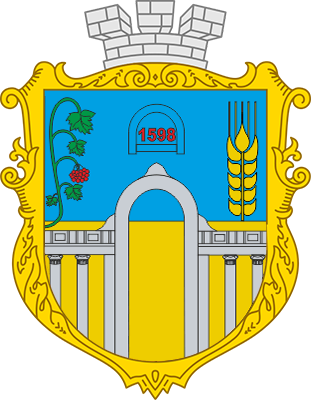
- Coat of arms

- Location within Vinnytsia Oblast Location within Ukraine
- Coordinates: 48°31′N 29°14′E
- Country: Ukraine
- Oblast: Vinnytsia Oblast
- District: Haisyn Raion
- First mentioned: 1598

Population (2025)
  - Total: 6,844
- Time zone: UTC+2 (EET)
  - Summer (DST): UTC+3 (EEST)

Trostianets (Ukrainian: Тростянець) is a rural settlement in Vinnytsia Oblast, Ukraine, located in the historic region of Podilia. It was formerly the administrative seat of Trostianets Raion but is now administered within Haisyn Raion. The town is situated on the Trostianets River, which is a tributary of the Southern Bug. The population in 2022 was 7,257 (2022 estimate).

== History ==
Trostianets was first mentioned in 1598. Historically, it was known as Adamhorod (Adamgrod) and was a private town in Poland, located in the Bracław Voivodeship, owned by the House of Potocki.

Until 26 January 2024, Trostianets was designated an urban-type settlement. On this day, a new law entered into force, which abolished this status, and Trostianets became a rural settlement.

== Notable residents ==
- Mendel Osherowitch - Jewish journalist and writer, a witness to the Holodomor.
- Olga Storozhenko - Miss Ukraine Universe 2013.
