= Assassination of Boris Nemtsov =

2015 murder in Moscow, Russia

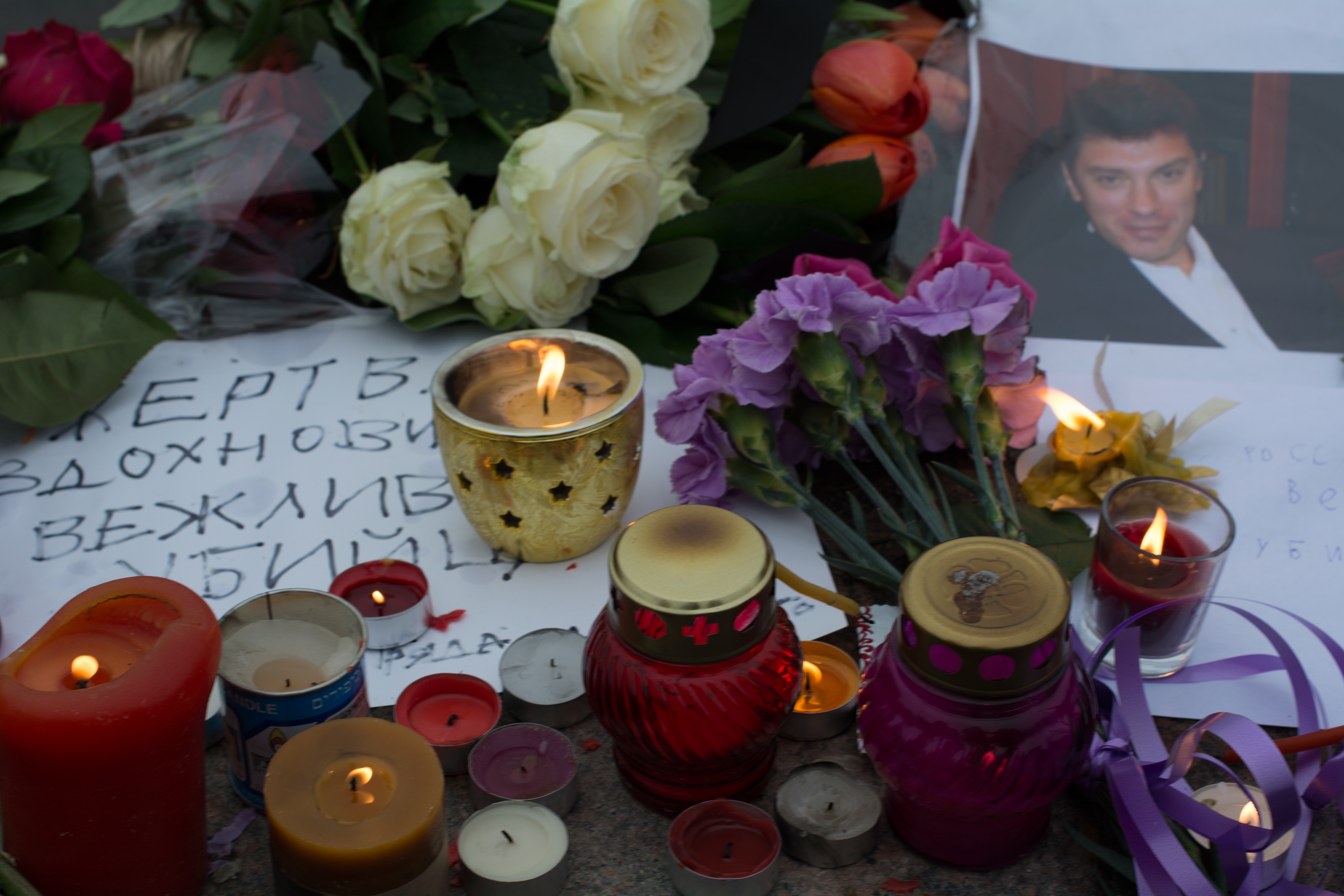
- Flowers and candles near the site of Nemtsov's assassination
- Location: 55°45′00″N 37°37′26″E; Bolshoy Moskvoretsky Bridge, Moscow
- Date: 27 February 2015; 11 years ago 23:31 (UTC+03:00)
- Target: Boris Nemtsov
- Attack type: Assassination
- Weapon: Makarov pistol
- Motive: Putinism; Political persecution Islamism
- Verdict: Guilty
- Convictions: Murder
- Sentence: Dadaev: 20 years in prison Accomplices: 11–19 years in prison
- Convicted: Zaur Dadaev; Anzor Gubashev; Shadid Gubashev; Tamerlan Eskerkhanov; Khamzat Bakhayev

On 27 February 2015, Boris Nemtsov, a Russian politician opposed to the government of Vladimir Putin, was assassinated as he crossed the Bolshoy Moskvoretsky Bridge in central Moscow at 23:31 local time. An unknown assailant fired seven or eight shots from a Makarov pistol. Four of them hit Nemtsov in the head, heart, liver and stomach, killing him almost instantly. He died hours after appealing to the public to support a march against Russia's war in Ukraine. Nemtsov's Ukrainian partner Anna Duritskaya survived the attack as its sole eyewitness.

The assassination was met with worldwide condemnation and concern for the situation of the Russian opposition. Russian authorities also condemned the murder and vowed to conduct a thorough investigation.

On 8 March 2015, Russian authorities charged Anzor Gubashev and Zaur Dadaev, both originating from the Northern Caucasus, with involvement in the crime. According to Russian authorities, Dadaev confessed to involvement in the murder. He later retracted his statement, on the grounds that it was extracted under torture. Three more suspects were arrested around the same time and, according to Russian media, another suspect blew himself up in Grozny when Russian police forces surrounded his apartment block.

== Attack and death ==
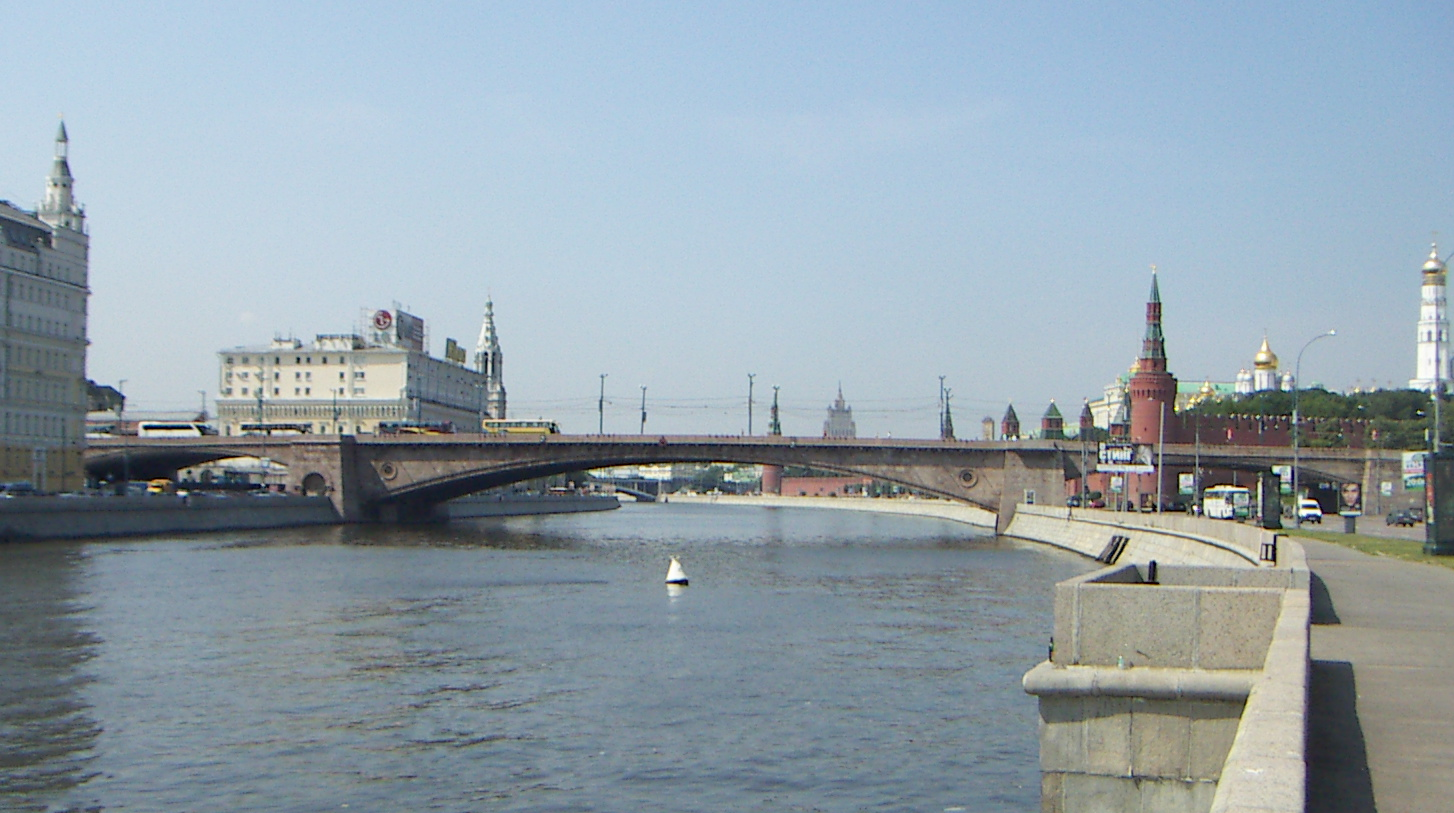
Nemtsov was shot dead while crossing the Bolshoy Moskvoretsky Bridge.

Nemtsov was shot and killed crossing the Bolshoy Moskvoretsky Bridge near the Kremlin, walking home after a meal out, in the company of Anna Duritskaya (Russian: Анна Дурицкая), a 23-year-old Ukrainian model who had been his girlfriend for two and a half years. She witnessed Nemtsov's killing, but was not physically harmed herself. TV Tsentr's video of the bridge at the time of the murder shows that it occurred as a municipal utility vehicle was passing by Nemtsov and a person is seen escaping from the scene in a white or grey automobile.

The Russian newspaper Kommersant reported that at the time of the murder all the security cameras in the area were switched off for maintenance. The only video of the incident was obtained from the video feed camera of TV Tsentr studio, from a long distance. At the time of the killing, the camera was blocked by a stopped municipal vehicle. The killing happened the day before Nemtsov was due to lead the opposition march Vesna (Russian: весна, lit. 'spring'), a street demonstration organised to protest against economic conditions in Russia and against the war in Ukraine.

The killer was apparently waiting for Nemtsov on a side stairway leading to the bridge. At least six shots were fired, four of which hit Nemtsov; one wound was fatal. The Kommersant sources reported that the killer used either a standard Makarov pistol or an IZh gas pistol modified for use with lethal ammunition. According to a witness, "a young man named Viktor M., who followed Nemtsov", the killer was a man of 170–175 centimetres (5 ft 7 in – 5 ft 9 in) height, short haircut, medium build, dressed in jeans and a brown sweater.

== Investigation ==
Russian President Vladimir Putin took "personal control" of the investigation into Nemtsov's assassination. He instructed the Investigative Committee, Ministry of Internal Affairs, and the Federal Security Service to create a single team to investigate the assassination of Nemtsov. The investigation team was headed by Igor Krasnov, who had previously investigated an attempt on the life of Anatoly Chubais and the murders of Stanislav Markelov and Anastasia Baburova.

The team was supervised by the head of the Investigative Committee in Moscow, general Alexander Drymanov. Drymanov had also supervised the investigation against Nadezhda Savchenko, the second trial against Mikhail Khodorkovsky and Platon Lebedev, as well as the charges of genocide during the Russo-Georgian War against Georgian military.

During the night following the assassination, Nemtsov's apartment on Malaya Ordynka street was searched and all documents and materials related to his business and political activities were confiscated. Opposition media raised concerns that this was done to retrieve a draft report on Russian involvement in the war in Donbas, announced by Nemtsov shortly before his death. Partial information on the report's contents were later revealed by Nemtsov's friends.

On 28 February, a white Lada Priora car possibly belonging to the assassin(s) was found abandoned. Russian state media reported that the car had a number-plate originating in the Republic of Ingushetia, although initial witnesses had stated that the white car involved in the shooting did not have any license plates. An underwater search in the Moscow River for a discarded weapon led to nothing being recovered. A cash reward of 3 million rubles (~43,000 euros) was offered for any information leading to the arrest and conviction of the killer.

Duritskaya, having testified before the investigative team, returned to Ukraine on 2 March. Because of reported threats to her life, the Prosecutor General of Ukraine Viktor Shokin provided Duritskaya with state protection.

By 3 March, the official investigation concluded that Nemtsov had been tracked from 11:00 am when he met Duritskaya in Sheremetyevo Airport. Nemtsov had been followed by three alternating cars en route from the airport to the city. At 23:22, the group of killers was ordered to move to the assigned spot, when Nemtsov and Duritskaya left the GUM café. At 23:29, the car with the assailant turned around under the Bolshoy Moskvoretsky Bridge and approached the stairs leading to the bridge. At 23:30, the assailant walked upstairs onto the bridge and moved towards Nemtsov and Duritskaya. Having walked past them, he turned around and fired at Nemtsov's back.

After the assailant got into the car, the vehicle moved from the bridge to Bolotnaya Street, then to Bolshoy Kamenny Bridge, Mokhovaya Street and Tverskaya Street towards Okhotny Ryad. The car then turned to Bolshaya Dmitrovka before disappearing in local traffic. The car in which the assailant had escaped was later found and identified as a grey ZAZ Chance. On 10 March, Moskovskij Komsomolets published alleged CCTV photos of the suspects' vehicle, suggesting that they were following Nemtsov since September 2014, long before the Charlie Hebdo shooting.

== Suspects ==
On 7 March 2015, the head of the Federal Security Service Alexander Bortnikov announced the arrest of two suspects, Anzor Gubashev and Zaur Dadaev, both originating from the Northern Caucasus. Russian media reported Zaur Dadaev had served in the Sever battalion of the Kadyrovtsy, while Anzor Gubashev had worked as a security guard for a Moscow hypermarket. According to other sources, the latter is an employee of a private security firm.

Both are from Ingushetia, but for many years had been living outside the North Caucasus Republic. They are related. They were formally charged on 8 March. Dadaev confessed to the crime, but Gubashev denied any involvement.

Three other people were detained as suspects, but not charged. All of them claimed that they were innocent. Russian media reported that another man blew himself up with a hand grenade in Grozny when police came to arrest him.

Zaur Dadaev, a former second-in-command to the leader of the Sever battalion, Alibek Delimkhanov (the brother of Adam Delimkhanov and cousin of Ramzan Kadyrov), confessed that he had decided to kill Nemtsov because of his criticism of Islam and the President of the Chechen Republic, Ramzan Kadyrov, according to Russian media. Dadaev apparently stated in his confession that his immediate manager during preparation for the murder was someone named Ruslik, who provided him with 5 million rubles, a ZAZ Chance car, and a gun. Investigators suspect that Ruslik is Ruslan Mukhudinov. Ruslan Mukhudinov's whereabouts are unknown, though he was placed on an international wanted list.

Ruslan Geremeev was a suspect in the case. Ruslan Geremeev was the head of a battalion Sever unit Zaur Dadayev served in, a subordinate of Alimbek Delimkhanov and a nephew of Suleiman Geremeev, a member of the Federation Council of Russia. After the murder, Ruslan Geremeev was under protection in the Chechen Republic and later probably left Russia for the United Arab Emirates. At the end of April 2015, Ruslan Gereemev was reportedly officially assigned a status of a suspect.

Commenting on the events, the President of the Chechen Republic, Ramzan Kadyrov, said that he knew Dadaev as one of the bravest warriors who had fought in the Russian-Chechen Kadyrovtsy regiment since its creation. Dadaev had been awarded the Order of Courage, the Medal for Courage, and further awards by the Chechen Republic. He also stated that Dadaev was deeply religious and greatly offended by Charlie Hebdo's publishing of the Muhammad cartoons and Nemtsov's support for the French cartoonists.

However, the Kadyrovtsy were a secular unit fighting against radical Islamists and according to Dadaev's mother, her son had never mentioned Charlie Hebdo. She stated that her son was not a "strong believer" in Islam, and had in fact fought against Islamists ("Wahhabis") previously. Ilya Yashin called the theory that the murder was motivated by offense against Islam and the official line of inquiry by the Kremlin "more than absurd".

Russian media reported that Dadaev retracted his confession, explaining that he only confessed to avoid "what happened to Shavanov" – another suspect, who, according to the official version, blew himself up with a grenade during an arrest attempt. A member of the Kremlin's advisory council on human rights, after visiting the suspects, said that Dadaev as well as the two other suspects, Anzor and Shagid Gubashev, most likely had been tortured while in detention.

Just before his murder, Nemtsov had stated: "The contract between Kadyrov and Putin – money in exchange for loyalty – is coming to an end. Where will Mr Kadyrov's 20,000 men go? What will they demand? How will they act? When will they come to Moscow?"

In late June 2017, five Chechen men were found guilty by a jury in a court at Moscow for agreeing to kill Nemtsov in exchange for 15 million rubles (US$253,000). Neither the identity nor whereabouts of the person who hired them is known.

In July 2017, Zaur Dadaev was sentenced to 20 years imprisonment by a Russian court. The other perpetrators were handed between 11 and 19 years each. One of those sentenced to 14 years in March 2024 received a pardon in exchange for participating in Russian invasion of Ukraine.

According to Bellingcat analysis, Nemtsov was followed prior to the assassination by the same FSB team that would subsequently follow Vladimir Kara-Murza, Dmitry Bykov and Alexei Navalny before their suspected poisonings.

== Criticism of the official investigation ==
At the end of October 2017, journalist David Satter published an article in the National Review about an unofficial public investigation of the assassination. The investigation was led by Igor Murzin, a St. Petersburg lawyer who specializes in auto accidents and the interpretation of videotape. Murzin's investigation makes claims of the official trial as being a cover-up, with real murderers never being under investigation.

In June 2019, Parliamentary Assembly of the Council of Europe (PACE) called on the Russian authorities to re-open and continue the investigation, listing a number of what was called "serious concerns over its independence and effectiveness", and approved a report on the matter by Emanuelis Zingeris. PACE criticized the official version of the murder as "based on a severely flawed investigation and trial" and "inconsistent with the available evidence on numerous fundamental points". According to its unanimously approved resolution, alternative versions that Russian authorities have refused to explore are far more consistent with the available evidence. The Assembly invited states that have adopted Magnitsky laws to consider sanctions against those responsible for what it called "an investigation failure".

Leonid Bershidsky of the Bloomberg View stated: "In recent months, Putin's propaganda machine has been vigorously inciting Russians against the 'fifth column' – those who protested against the annexation of Crimea and the Kremlin-instigated war in eastern Ukraine. Nemtsov was on every list of traitors published on the Internet and aired on state TV." In The Daily Telegraph, Ben Judah wrote that the Kremlin "either ordered or allowed [Nemtsov's murder] to happen", saying "Nothing Boris Nemtsov did was not bugged, tailed, filmed or monitored by the secret police. It is quite simply impossible that this man could have been shot dead without the Kremlin knowing there was a plot afoot to kill him."

Some saw parallels with the murder of Sergey Kirov in 1934. Brian Whitmore, writing for Radio Free Europe, stated that the murder indicated the development of a "hybrid Great Terror campaign" against Putin's opposition.

BBC News referred to an interview Nemtsov gave on 10 February, 17 days before his death, in which Russia's Sobesednik newspaper reported that Nemtsov said that his mother was afraid Russian President Vladimir Putin would kill him. He added that his 86-year-old mother is also afraid for the lives of Mikhail Khodorkovsky and Alexei Navalny. When asked if he himself feared for his life, Nemtsov answered, "Yes, not as strongly as my mother, but still ..." After BBC News referred to the interview, on 27 February 2015, the Sobesednik posted an extended version of the original interview, in which Nemtsov reportedly added, "I am just joking. If I were afraid of Putin, I wouldn't be in this line of work."

== Funeral ==
Nemtsov was buried on 3 March 2015 at the Troyekurovskoye Cemetery in Moscow.

Latvian MEP Sandra Kalniete and Speaker of the Polish Senate Bogdan Borusewicz were not allowed to attend the funeral due to travel bans imposed by Russia. The travel bans bar certain EU and Western politicians from visiting Russia for their alleged "anti-Russian activities". Russia's sanctions were imposed in response to Western-led sanctions against officials close to the Kremlin for their alleged conduct during the Ukrainian Crisis.

Kalniete stated that "Since I have always taken a clear and explicit language on Russia's role in Ukraine, I had suspicions that it could happen." The president of the European Parliament, Martin Schulz, called the ban a "high affront".

A Russian court decided not to grant the request of Alexei Navalny, a Russian opposition leader jailed for 15 days for distributing fliers, for a temporary release to attend the funeral.

== Memorial marches ==
March in memory of Boris Nemtsov in Moscow, 1 March 2015. Sight from the inside No. 5. Remand.

March in memory of Boris Nemtsov in Moscow, 1 March 2015. Sight from the inside No. 9. Flag of Ukraine.

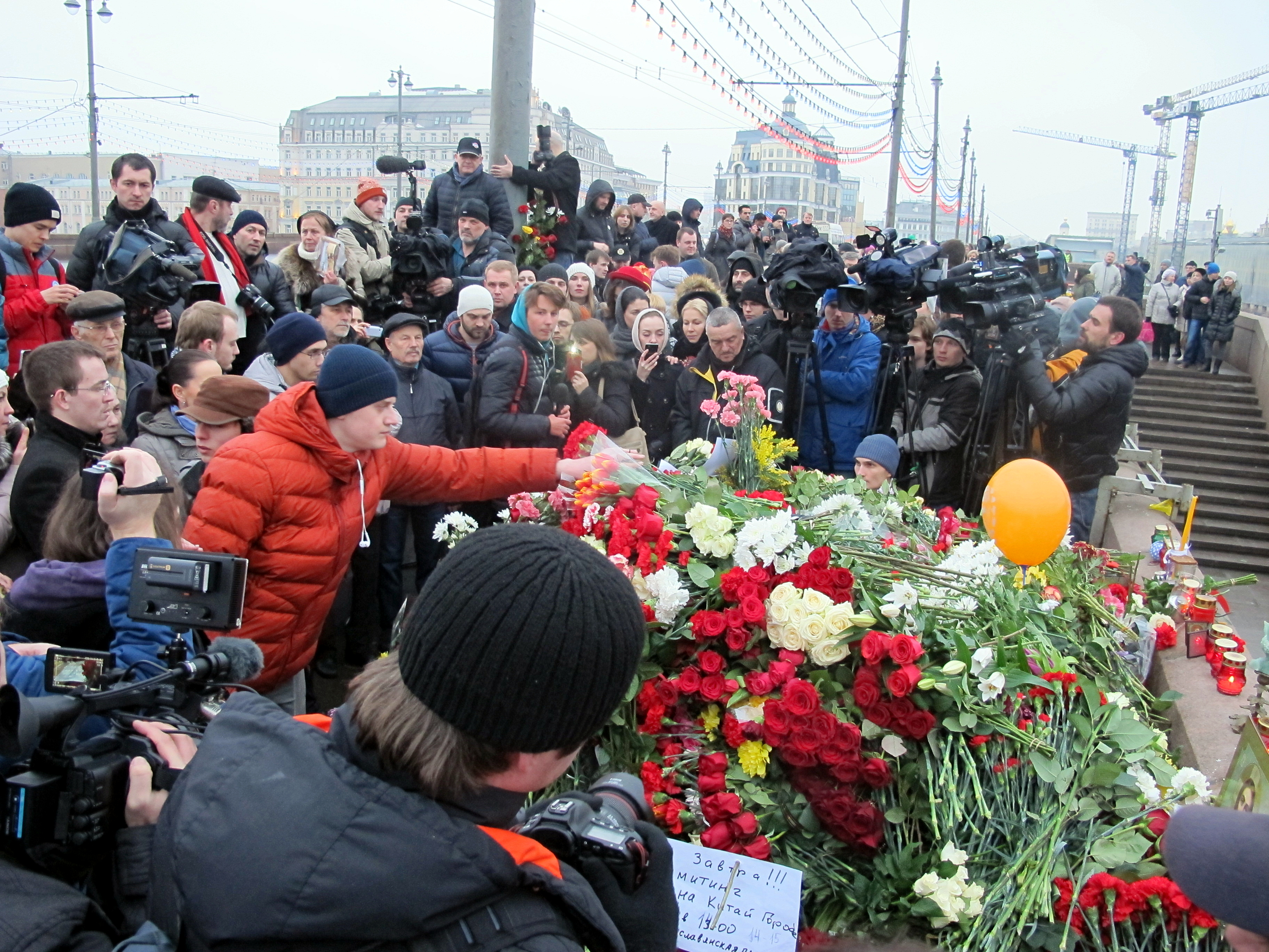
People gathered at the site of Boris Nemtsov's murder, 28 February 2015

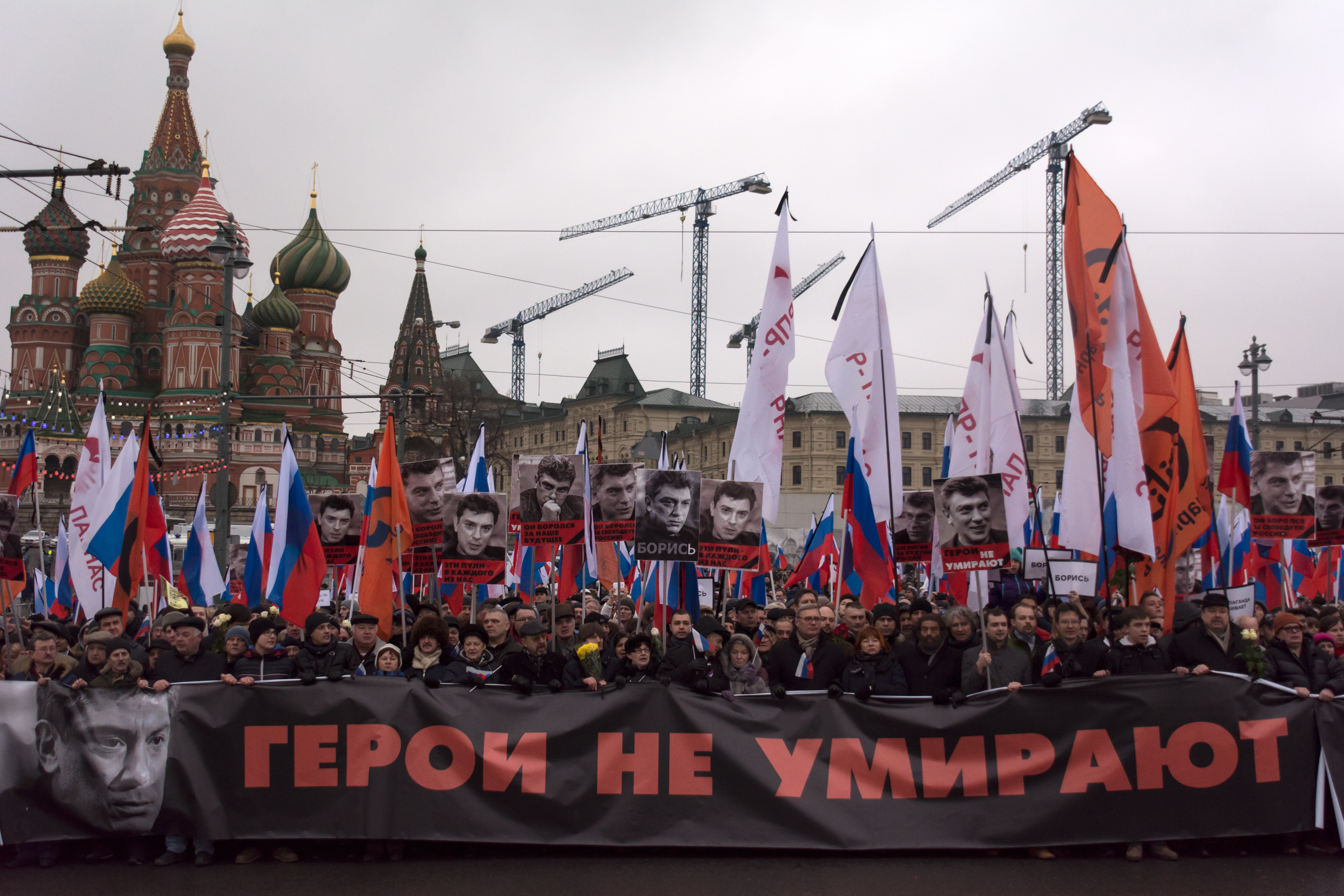
March in memory of Boris Nemtsov in Moscow, 1 March 2015. Banner reads as following: Heroes don't die.

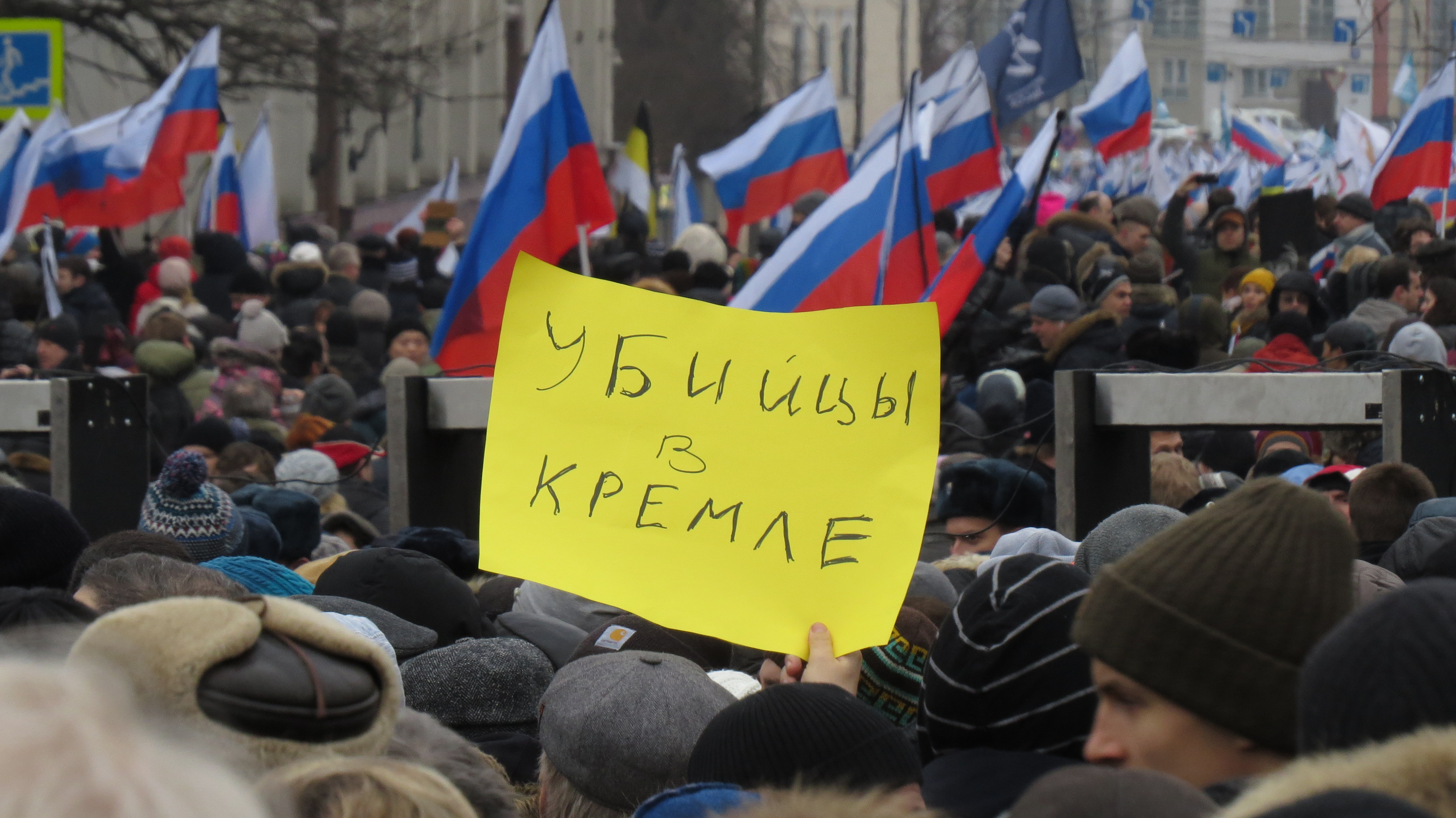
Moscow march for Nemtsov, 1 March 2015; the sign in the front says: The murderers are in the Kremlin.

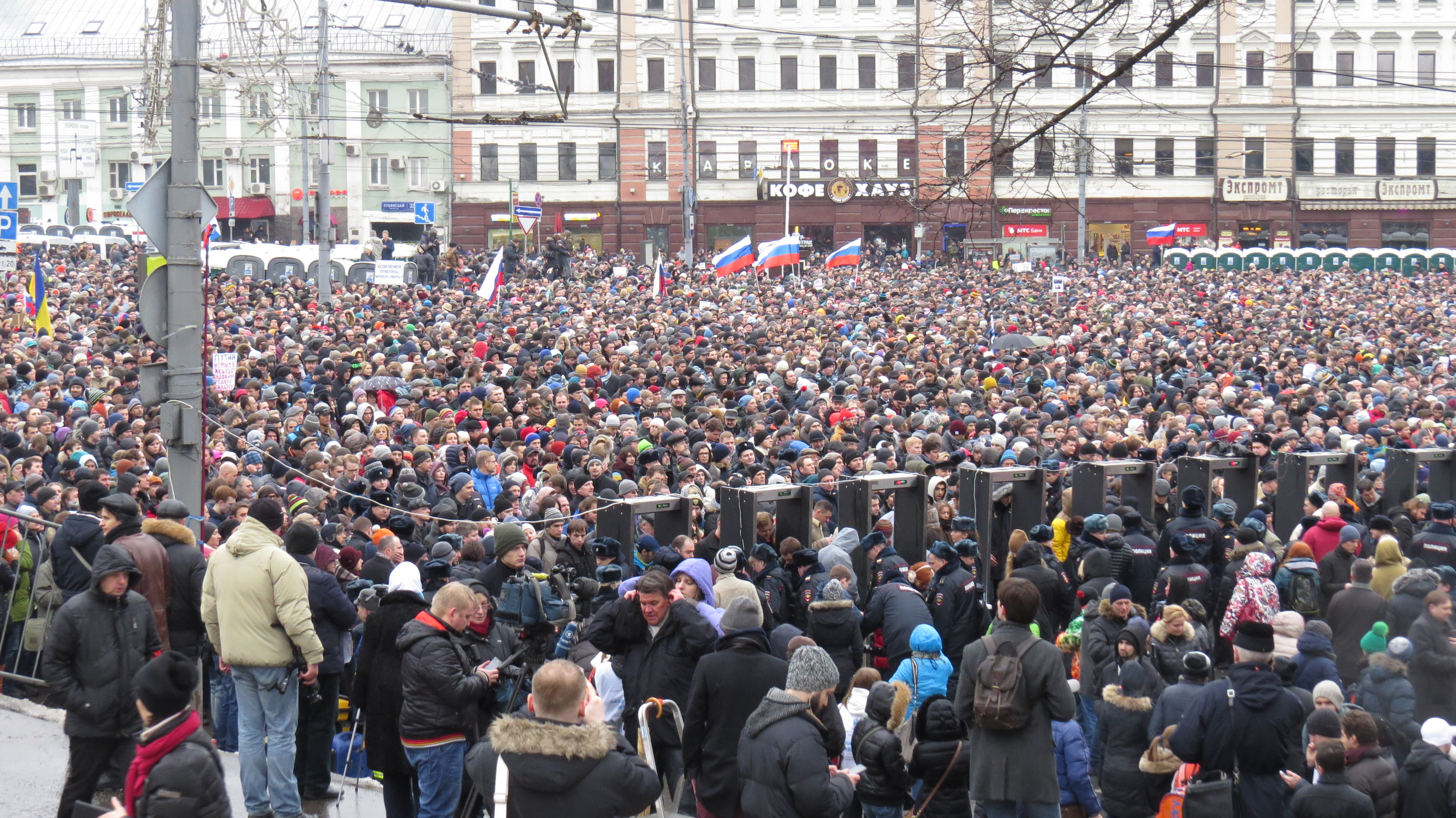
Moscow march for Nemtsov, 1 March 2015

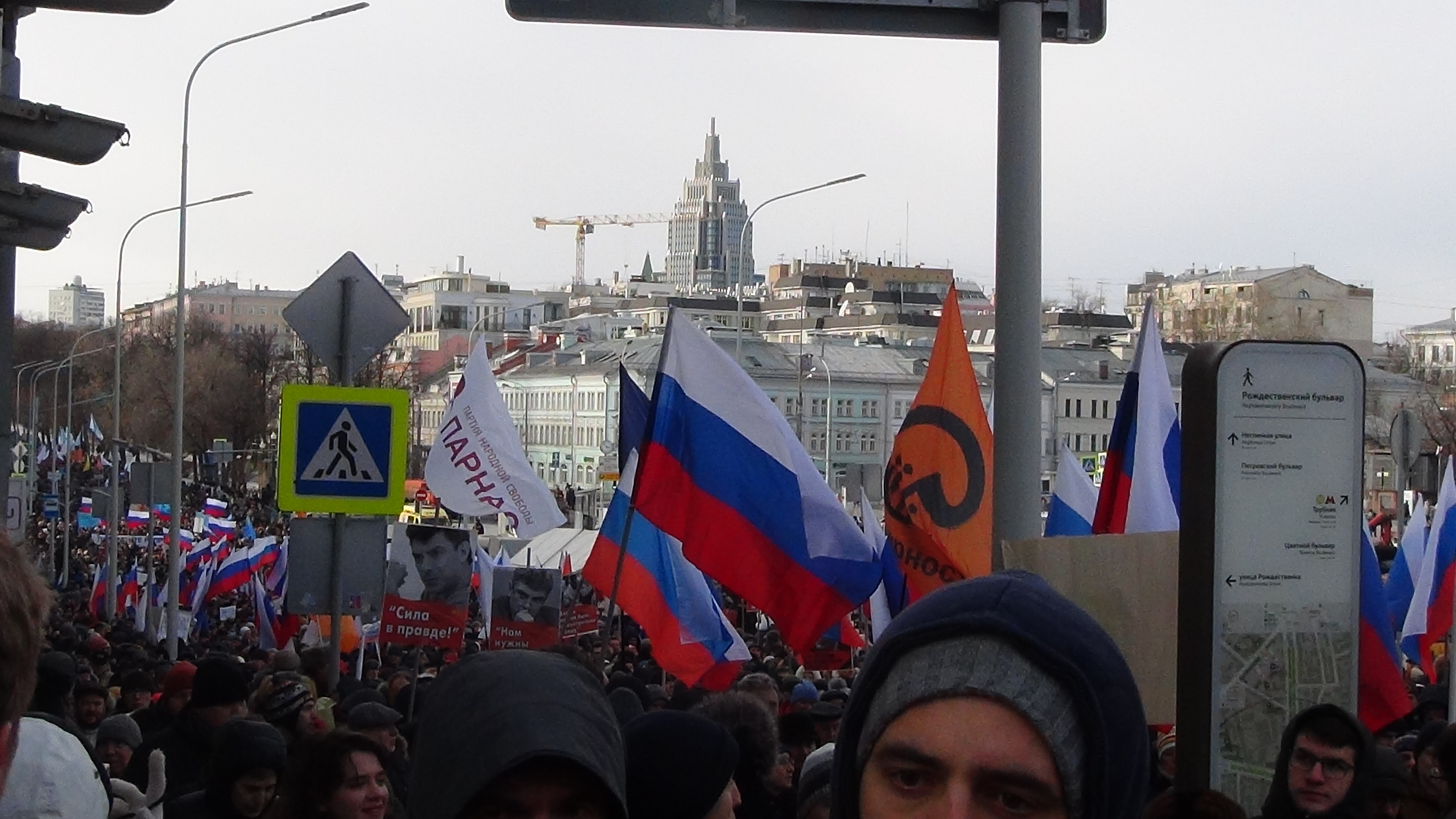
Moscow march for Nemtsov in February 2017

On the morning of 28 February, the opposition party RPR-PARNAS announced a gathering on the Bolshoy Moskvoretsky Bridge in Moscow, where Nemtsov was shot. Boris Nemtsov was an organizer of the anti-crisis and anti-war march Vesna ("Spring") planned on 1 March 2015. After the murder, the organizers transformed the planned march into a memorial for Nemtsov. The participants marched from Kitay-gorod to Bolshoy Moskvoretsky Bridge where Nemtsov was murdered.

According to the organizers more than 50,000 people took part in the march, while Moscow police counted 21,000 participants. Around 50 people were arrested for disobedience to police, including Ukrainian Verkhovna Rada deputy Oleksiy Honcharenko. According to Honcharenko, he was beaten and deprived of medical and legal help while in detention. Honcharenko was released from prison the next day, but he promised to sue the Russian Ministry of Internal Affairs.

On 1 March, simultaneous with the march in Moscow, Nemtsov memorial marches were held in Saint Petersburg (finished with a meeting on the Field of Mars), Yekaterinburg, Murmansk London and Paris. A silent one-person rotating commemoration was held in Murmansk by Irina Paykacheva, she was fined for her participation in the "unsanctioned event".

On 3 March, the Russian artist Lena Hades began an art marathon in memory of Nemtsov, producing portraits of him daily. She said she would stop only when the person or people who ordered Nemtsov's murder are arrested and sentenced.

In August 2017, an activist guarding a Nemtsov memorial, Ivan Skripnichenko, was killed by a Putin supporter.

Mourners have held an around-the-clock vigil for late Nemtsov, which into its fourth year, as of 2018.

10,000 to 22,000 people marched in Moscow in memory of Boris Nemtsov on 29 February 2020. 2,000 people marched in Saint Petersburg, Novosibirsk, and Vladivostok.

== Boris Nemtsov Plaza ==
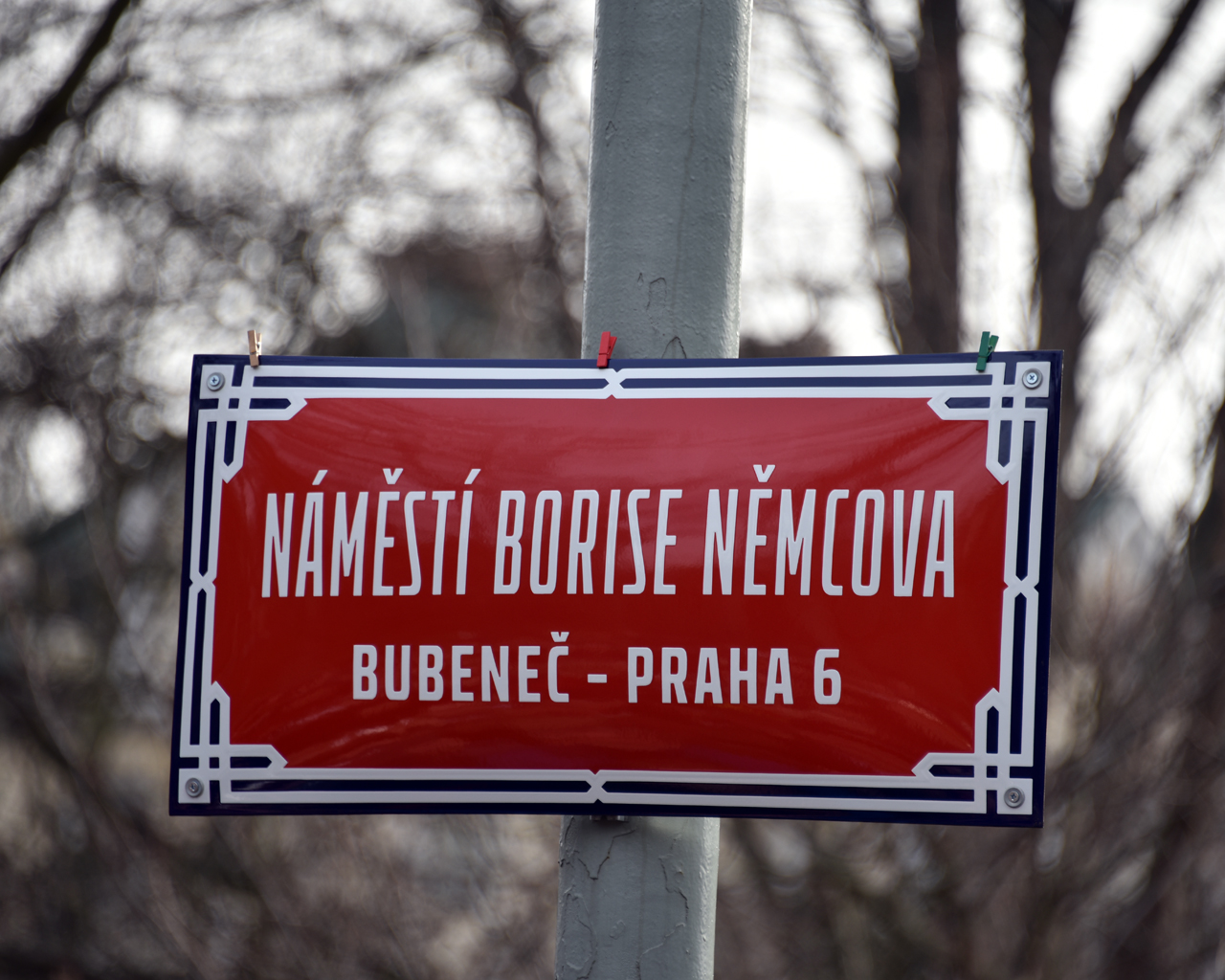
Boris Nemtsov Plaza in front of the Russian embassy in Prague, Czech Republic

On 6 December 2017, Nemtsov's daughter Zhanna Nemtsova traveled from Germany, accompanied by other family members and Russian dissidents, to urge members of the Council of the District of Columbia—Washington, D.C.'s legislature—to rename a portion of the street in front of the Russian Embassy "Boris Nemtsov Plaza" in honor of her father and as a signal to Russian authorities of US disapproval of their policies and of their alleged role in Nemtsov's assassination.

Legislation to formally make the change was co-sponsored by Council chairman Phil Mendelson, who expected the bill to be approved by Council early in 2018. On 9 January 2018, the Council unanimously approved the "Boris Nemtsov Plaza Designation Act of 2017" which authorized the renaming, effective 5 May 2018.

In May 2018, the square near the Russian embassy in Vilnius, Lithuania was renamed to "Boris Nemcov Square".

In February 2020, the square outside the Russian embassy in Prague, Czech Republic was renamed to Boris Nemtsov Plaza.

== See also ==
- Human rights in Russia
- List of assassinations in Europe § Russia
- List of unsolved murders (2000–present)
- Politics of Russia
- Putin.Voina
- Poisoning of Sergei and Yulia Skripal
- Poisoning of Alexei Navalny
- Poisoning of Alexander Litvinenko
- Assassination of Anna Politkovskaya
- Death of Alexei Navalny
- Sergei Magnitsky#Custody and death
- 2023 Wagner Group plane crash
- Boris Berezovsky#Death
