= Miss Ukraine Universe 2018 =

- Date: 14 August 2018
- Presenters: Oleksandr Skichko and Maria Litti
- Entertainment: Poligraf Sharikoff • Tayanna • Rozhden • Alyosha • Artem Pivovarov • Constantine • Ivan Navi • Tamerlan Alena • DJ Nana
- Venue: Fairmont Grand Hotel Kyiv, Kyiv, Ukraine
- Entrants: 18
- Placements: 5
- Winner: Karyna Zhosan; Odesa

Miss Ukraine Universe 2018, the 23rd edition of the Miss Ukraine Universe pageant was held in Fairmont Grand Hotel in Kyiv. Yana Krasnikova of Kyiv crowned her successor Karyna Zhosan of Odesa at the end of the event. 18 contestants competed for the crown.

The winner represented Ukraine at Miss Universe 2018 pageant in Bangkok, Thailand.

== Results ==
=== Placement ===
Result	Contestant
Miss Ukraine Universe 2018	Karyna Zhosan
1st Runner-Up	Natalia Bolykh
2nd Runner-Up	Valeria Ryabchenko
3rd Runner-Up	Anna Duritskaya
4th Runner-Up	Kateryna Semenyachenko

== Contestants ==
The official Top 18 finalists of The Next Miss Ukraine Universe 2018.

Contestant	Age	Height	Hometown	Placement
Alyona Lesik	23	1.74 m (5 ft 8 1/2 in)	Kharkiv	
Anastasiia Kuzevych	25	1.75 m (5 ft 9 in)	Mykolaiv	
Anna Duritskaya	25	1.75 m (5 ft 9 in)	Bila Tserkva	
Antonina Balanetska	24	1.78 m (5 ft 10 in)	Chernivtsi	
Daria Akhmetova	27			
Diana Gasanenko	19	1.76 m (5 ft 9 1/2 in)	Odesa	
Galina Prystash	25			
Irina Mars	24		Kyiv	
Irina Shevchuk	20			
Julie Freitas	26			
Karina Zhosan	23			
Kateryna Semenyachenko	25			
Kseniya Klyuyko	24			
Natalia Bolykh	23			
Olga Litvinenko	28			
Valeria Ryabchenko	23			
Vlada Putava	19			
Yana Belyaeva	26			
