= Anastasia Chernova =

Miss Ukraine Universe

- Born: Anastasia Chernova; November 2, 1993 (age 32); Kharkiv, Ukraine
- Height: 1.77 m (5 ft 9 1/2 in)
- Beauty pageant titleholder
- Title: Miss Ukraine Universe 2012
- Hair color: Blonde
- Eye color: Blue/Grey
- Major competitions: Miss Ukraine Universe 2012 (Winner); Miss Universe 2012 (Unplaced)

Anastasia Chernova (Ukrainian: Анастасія Чернова, born November 2, 1993) is a Ukrainian teacher, model and beauty pageant titleholder who was crowned Miss Ukraine Universe 2012 in October 2012 and represented Ukraine in the 2012 Miss Universe pageant. 2004 Miss Ukraine Universe winner Oleksandra Nikolayenko helped her prepare for the Miss Universe pageant. Ukrainian designer Anastasiya Sukhanov created the traditional Cossack-inspired dress that Chernova wore at the competition.

== Early life ==
Chernova is a second-year student of the Pedagogical University and she an English language teacher.

== Miss Ukraine Universe 2012 ==
She won the Queen of Kharkiv Title and the right to participate in Miss Ukraine Universe. Anastasia Chernova, from Kharkiv, was crowned Miss Ukraine Universe 2012 during an event held in Kyiv on October 18.

== Miss Universe 2012 ==
Chernova represented Ukraine at Miss Universe 2012 in Las Vegas, United States on December 19, 2012, but failed to place among the Top 16 Semifinalist

Awards and achievements
Preceded by Olesya Stefanko	Miss Ukraine Universe; 2012	Succeeded by Olga Storozhenko
