= Miss Ukraine Universe 2017 =

- Date: 10 August 2017
- Presenters: Oleksandr Skichko and Maria Litti
- Entertainment: Oleynik • Dante Thomas • Ivan Navi • Olya Polyakova • Maria Yaremchuk • Tayanna • Yana Brilitskaya
- Venue: Fairmont Grand Hotel Kyiv, Kyiv, Ukraine
- Entrants: 16
- Placements: 5
- Winner: Yana Krasnikova; Kyiv

Miss Ukraine Universe 2017, the 22nd edition of the Miss Ukraine Universe pageant was held in Fairmont Grand Hotel in Kyiv. Alena Spodynyuk of Kyiv crowned her successor Yana Krasnikova of Kyiv at the end of the event. 16 contestants competed for the crown.

The winner represented Ukraine at Miss Universe 2017 pageant in Las Vegas.

== Results ==
=== Placement ===
Placement	Contestant
Miss Ukraine Universe 2017	Kyiv – Yana Krasnikova
1st Runner-Up	Kyiv – Karyna Komyshna
2nd Runner-Up	Kyiv – Veronika Sherstyuk
3rd Runner-Up	Zaporizhia – Kristina Khomchenko
4th Runner-Up	Kropyvnytskyi – Rimma Mkrtchyan

=== Special awards ===
Award	Contestant
Miss KUZ	Kharkiv – Yana Sergeeva
Miss Eurolab	Sievierodonetsk – Yuliya Gaiduk
Miss Kodi	Ternopil – Natalya Angel
Miss Goldwell	Dnipro – Anna Salikhova

== Contestants ==
The official Top 16 finalists of The Next Miss Ukraine Universe 2017.

Contestant	Age	Hometown	Placement
Zhanna Zavyalova	22	Kyiv	
Kristina Khomchenko	26	Zaporizhia	3rd Runner-Up
Natalia Feygina	22	Vinnytsia	
Veronika Sherstyuk	23	Kyiv	2nd Runner-Up
Yuliya Gaiduk	26	Sievierodonetsk	
Iryna Kotsyuruba	24	Vinnytsia	
Natalya Angel	20	Ternopil	
Yana Sergeeva	27	Kharkiv	
Olga Obesniuk	24	Kyiv	
Karyna Komyshna	21	Kyiv	1st Runner-Up
Anna Salikhova	24	Dnipropetrovsk	
Arina Trofimova	26	Odesa	
Yana Krasnikova	18	Kyiv	Miss Ukraine Universe 2017
Rimma Mkrtchyan	22	Kropyvnytskyi	4th Runner-Up
Alina Markurskaite	23	Kyiv	
Maria Bobrovna	18	Kyiv	

== Judges ==
- Anna Filimonova - Head of the Organizing Committee of Miss Ukraine Universe Pageant
- Kateryna Silchenko - designer, the owner of the popular Ukrainian brand The COAT by Katya Silchenko, the leading stylist of Ukraine
- Andriy Palchevsky - a successful businessman, philosopher, founder and head of the Eurolab medical center, TV presenter, president of the Charitable Foundation
- Andriy Pyatov - Honored Master of Sports, vice-captain and goalkeeper of the national football team of Ukraine, permanent goalkeeper of the football club of the club "Shakhtar"
- Dante Thomas - American singer
- Yuriy Cheban - Honored Master of Sports, two-time Olympic champion, two-time world champion in canoeing
- Ted Halbush - owner of the international cruise company Carnival Cruise Lines.
