= Anna Filimonova =

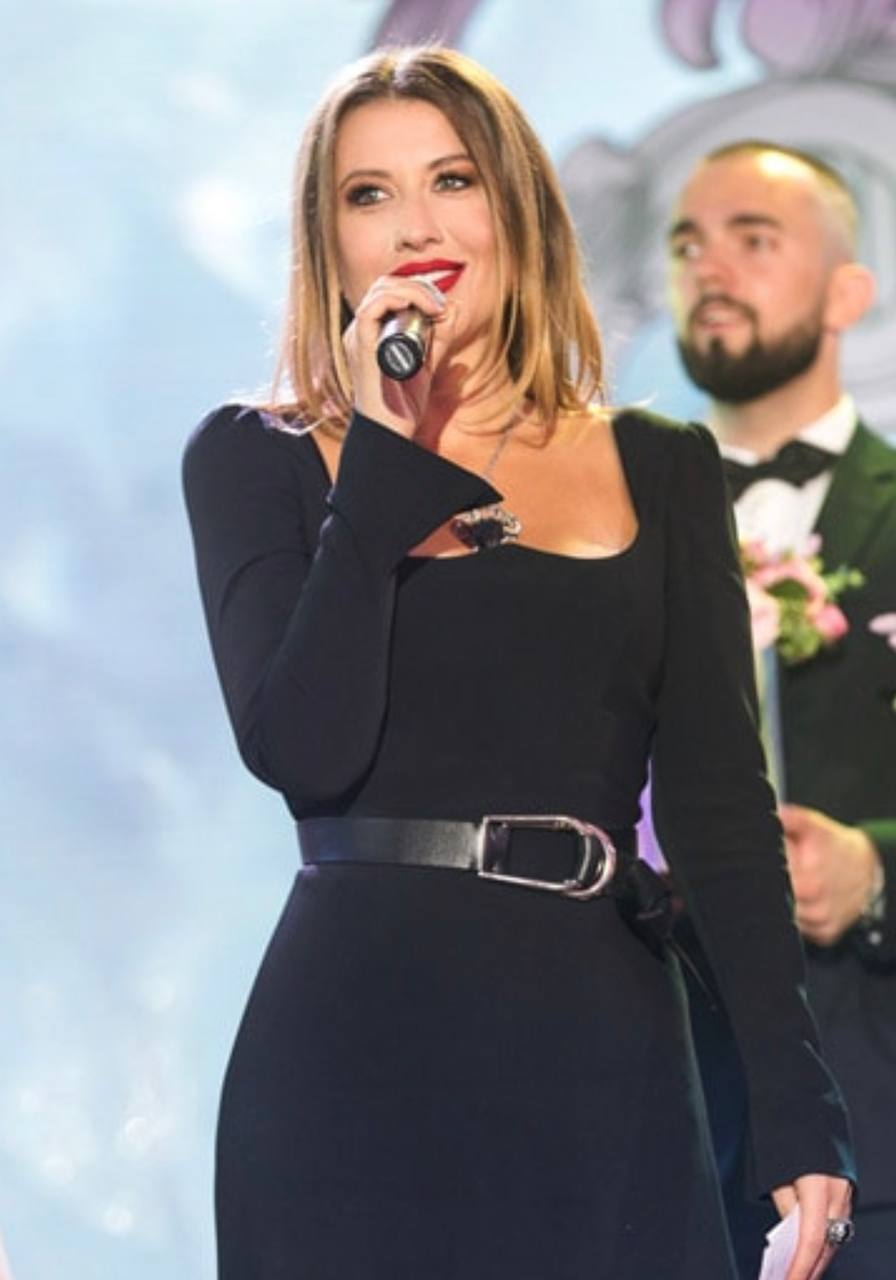
- Born: Anna Filimonova; 3 December 1981 (age 44); Kyiv, Ukraine
- Education: Kyiv National University of Culture and Arts
- Occupations: Imagemaker, journalist, TV-host
- Website: filimonovaanna.com

Anna Filimonova (born 3 December 1981) is a Ukrainian imagemaker, journalist, TV-host and the owner of the Miss Universe Ukraine pageant.

== Career ==
In 1999 Filimonova worked as one of the TV-host of the Ukrainian channel O-TV.

From 2003 to 2006 Filimonova was an editor of the "Paparazzi" magazine, headed by Valid Arfush and Omar Arfush. In 2006 she became a public relations manager and director of the Miss Universe Ukraine competition, and began to work with Oleksandra Nikolaenko-Ruffin.

In 2008 Filimonova appeared on the cover of Ukrainian Playboy.

In 2012 Filimonova became a coach for a team of models in a Ukrainian reality show "Masha and Models" (TET TV Channel).

Since 2015 Filimonova has been the president of the Miss Universe Ukraine pageant.

In 2023 she appeared on the cover of Insider magazine.
