= Olesya Stefanko =

Ukrainian lawyer and beauty pageant titleholder

Olesia Stefanko Олеся Стефанко
- Born: Olesia Stefanko; June 25, 1988 (age 38); Kovalivka, Kolomyia Raion, Ivano-Frankivsk Oblast, Ukrainian SSR, Soviet Union
- Height: 1.78 m (5 ft 10 in)
- Spouse: Serge Aliseenko (m. 2016)
- Beauty pageant titleholder
- Title: Miss Ukraine Universe 2011
- Hair color: Brown
- Eye color: Hazel
- Major competitions: Miss Ukraine Universe 2011 (Winner); Miss Universe 2011 (1st Runner-Up)

Olesia Stefanko (Ukrainian: Олеся Стефанко; (born June 25, 1988) is a Ukrainian lawyer and beauty pageant titleholder who was crowned Miss Ukraine Universe 2011 and represented her country in the 2011 Miss Universe pageant, where she placed 1st runner up.

== Early life ==
Born in Kovalivka, Kolomyia Raion in the Carpathian region of Ukraine, Stefanko was named Miss Odesa National Law Academy in 2008 as a student at the Institute of Prosecution and Investigation. She graduated with degree in Law from National University Odesa Law Academy in 2012 and planning to start her career in Kyiv prosecutor's office.

== Pageantry ==
=== Miss Ukraine Universe 2011 ===
Stefanko, who stands 1.76 m (5 ft 9 in) tall, competed as one of 15 finalists in her country's national beauty pageant, Miss Ukraine Universe, held in Kyiv on 11 December 2010, where she became the eventual winner of the title, gaining the right to represent Ukraine in the 2011 Miss Universe pageant.

=== Miss Universe 2011 ===
The following September, Stefanko placed first runner-up at Miss Universe 2011, which stands as Ukraine's highest placement at any Big Four Beauty Pageant.

During the final question and answer portion of the competition Stefanko was asked a question and read by judge Miss Universe 2003 Amelia Vega of the Dominican Republic: "If you could trade lives with anyone in history, who would it be and why?", Stefanko replied:

”I simply live my life and I’m very satisfied with it. But if I did have the chance to trade positions with someone I think I would choose Cleopatra. I think she is a very powerful and strong woman who is very much worthy of respect. And I think a woman could also be a leader like Cleopatra.”

Awards and achievements
Preceded by (Jamaica) Yendi Phillips	Miss Universe 1st Runner-Up; 2011	Succeeded by (Philippines) Janine Tugonon
Preceded by Anna Poslavska	Miss Ukraine Universe; 2011	Succeeded by Anastasia Chernova
