= Mendel Osherowitch =

Yiddish writer

- Born: January 14, 1888; Trostianets, Vinnytsia Oblast
- Died: April 16, 1965 (aged 77); New York City, U.S.
- Occupations: Journalist; novelist; historian; translator

Mendel Osherowitch (January 14, 1888 – April 16, 1965) was a Podilia-born American Yiddish journalist, novelist, historian, and translator. He wrote for The Forward from 1914 to 1965, and he authored many books, including three novels and a book about Yiddish theatre.

His two-volume Yidn in Uḳraine was printed posthumously but never sent to bookstores. The Yiddish Book Center found the printed copies sitting in a fish market in 1980 and distributed them to libraries.

His book on the Holodomor was translated into English in 2020.
