= Trostianets Raion, Vinnytsia Oblast =

Former subdivision of Vinnytsia Oblast, Ukraine

Trostianets Raion Тростянецький район
- Raion
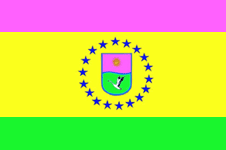
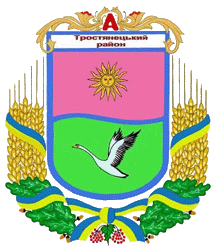
- Flag Coat of arms

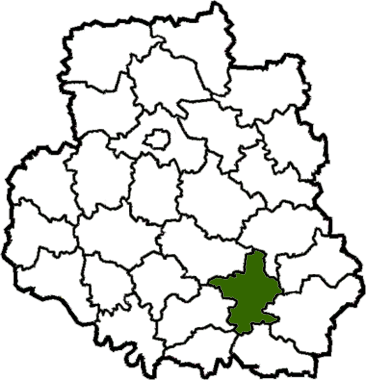
- Coordinates: 48°30′00″N 29°12′00″E
- Country: Ukraine
- Oblast: Vinnytsia Oblast
- Established: 1923
- Disestablished: 18 July 2020
- Admin. center: Trostianets
- Subdivisions: List: 0 — city councils; 1 — settlement councils; 17 — rural councils; Number of localities: 0 — cities; 1 — urban-type settlements; 28 — villages; — rural settlements

Government
  - Governor: Sergiy Skits

Area
  - Total: 860 km^{2} (330 sq mi)

Population (2020)
  - Total: 34,304 ▼
  - Density: 40/km^{2} (100/sq mi)
- Time zone: UTC+02:00 (EET)
  - Summer (DST): UTC+03:00 (EEST)
- Postal index: 24300—24361
- Area code: +380 4343
- Website: http://trost-rada.org.ua

Trostianets Raion (Ukrainian: Тростянецький район) was one of raions of Vinnytsia Oblast, located in southwestern Ukraine. The administrative center of the raion was the urban-type settlement of Trostianets. The raion was abolished and its territory was merged into Haisyn Raion on 18 July 2020 as part of the administrative reform of Ukraine, which reduced the number of raions of Vinnytsia Oblast to six. The last estimate of the raion population was 34,304 (2020 est.).
