= Inna Tsymbalyuk =

Ukrainian actress and model (born 1985)

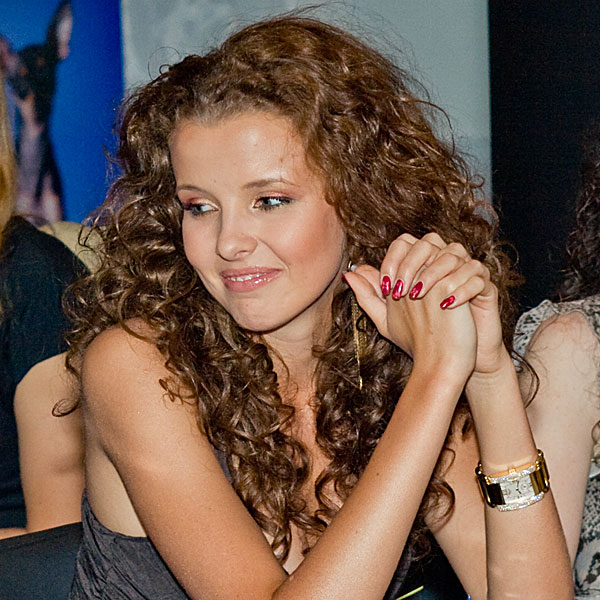
- Tsymbalyuk in 2008
- Born: June 11, 1985 (age 40); Chernivtsi, Ukrainian SSR, Soviet Union
- Occupations: Actress & Model
- Known for: Miss Ukraine Universe 2006
- Website: Inna Tsymbalyuk (in English)

Inna Anatoliivna Tsymbalyuk (Ukrainian: І́нна Анато́ліївна Цимбалю́к; born June 11, 1985) is a Ukrainian actress, model and beauty pageant titleholder who was crowned Miss Ukraine Universe 2006. She placed in the top 20 at the Miss Universe 2006 pageant.

Preceded by Juliya Chernyshova	Miss Ukraine Universe; 2006	Succeeded by Lyudmila Bikmullina
