= Lyudmila Bikmullina =

Ukrainian model of Russian roots

Lyudmyla Bikmullina
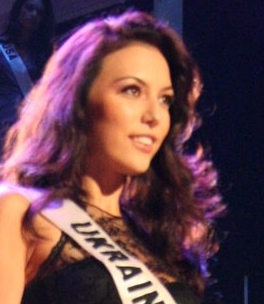
- Людмила Бікмулліна
- Born: January 26, 1986 (age 40); Kharkiv, Ukrainian SSR, Soviet Union
- Occupation: Model
- Beauty pageant titleholder
- Title: Miss Ukraine Universe 2007
- Major competitions: Miss Ukraine Universe 2007 (Winner); Miss Universe 2007 (Top 15)

Lyudmyla Ramiliivna Bikmullina (Ukrainian: Людмила Раміліївна Бікмулліна; born 26 January 1986) is a Ukrainian model and beauty pageant titleholder who won Miss Ukraine Universe 2007 and represented Ukraine at Miss Universe 2007 in Mexico. She married American millionaire Bill Kay, whom she met in Hong Kong, where she worked as a model. The couple has two children.

Preceded by Inna Tsymbalyuk	Miss Ukraine Universe; 2007	Succeeded by Eleonora Masalab
