= Miss Ukraine Universe 2016 =

- Date: June 29, 2016
- Presenters: Oleksandr Skichko and Maria Litti
- Entertainment: Bosson, Svetlana Loboda, Kamaliya, Mariya Yaremchuk, Tonia Matvienko, Tamerlan & Alena Omargalieva, Layah, Oleynik, Konstantin Dmitriev, Yana Brelitskaia.
- Venue: Fairmont Grand Hotel Kyiv, Kyiv, Ukraine
- Entrants: 15
- Placements: 4
- Winner: Alena Spodynyuk; Kyiv Oblast

The Miss Ukraine Universe 2016 took place on June 29, 2016 at the Fairmont Grand Hotel Kyiv, in a contest where fifteen contestants from different oblast competed for the crown.

The winner Alena Spodynyuk, from Sevastopol, was crowned by the outgoing title holder, Anna Vergelskaya (Miss Ukraine Universe 2015). Spodynyuk will represent Ukraine at Miss Universe 2016.

== Results ==
=== Placements ===
Placement	Contestant
Miss Ukraine Universe 2016	Kyiv – Alena Spodynyuk
1st Runner-Up	Dnipro – Yulia Hershun
2nd Runner-Up	Vinnytsia – Ekaterina Hubarenko
3rd Runner-Up	Kyiv – Olga Mubarakshina

=== Special awards ===
Award	Contestant
Miss CHI	Dnipro – Yulia Hershun
Miss KJF	Kyiv – Anna Pigun
Miss TEFI Smile	Kyiv – Alena Spodynyuk

== Top 15 ==
Contestant	Age	Oblast	Hometown
Alla Alekseenko	22	Dnipropetrovsk Oblast	Nikopol
Alena Spodynyuk	18	Kyiv Oblast	Kyiv
Alina Pigun	26	Kyiv Oblast	Kyiv
Anna Igoshina	25	Zaporizhia Oblast	Zaporizhia
Darina Korshikova	19	Kyiv Oblast	Borovaya Village
Ekaterina Hubarenko	24	Vinnytsia Oblast	Vinnytsia
Karina Halaeva	19	Odesa Oblast	Odesa
Kristina Ermakova	26	Kyiv Oblast	Kyiv
Oksana Karpiak	24	Lviv Oblast	Lviv
Olga Mubarakshina	26	Kyiv Oblast	Kyiv
Valeria Alekseevna Khodoreva	22	Kyiv Oblast	Kyiv
Veronika Andreevna Petrachenkova	22	Kyiv Oblast	Kyi
Yulia Grishko	20	Kyiv Oblast	Kyiv
Yulia Hershun	26	Dnipropetrovsk Oblast	Dnipro
Yulia Zakharova	25	Kyiv Oblast	Kyiv

== Judges ==
- Head of the organizing Committee of the contest "Miss Ukraine Universe", Anna Filimonova
- a leading hotelier of Ukraine, Anastasia Golinskaia
- a patron of art, a public figure, Maksim Glushchenko
- Swedish singer-songwriter, Bosson
- a plastic surgeon of the 1st category, Taras Matolinets
- a fashion designer, Olga Blank
- Ukrainian football player, Yevgenii Levchenko
- Ukrainian gymnast, Oleg Verniaiev
- the programmer from Silicon valley, John Sung Kim
