= Anna Poslavska =

Ukrainian beauty pageant titleholder

- Born: 28 April 1987 (age 39); Nova Kakhovka, Ukrainian SSR, Soviet Union
- Beauty pageant titleholder
- Title: Miss Ukraine Universe 2010
- Major competitions: Miss Ukraine 2009 (People's Choice); Miss Ukraine Universe 2010 (Winner); Miss Universe 2010 (3rd runner-up)

Anna Poslavska (Ukrainian: Анна Пославська; born 28 April 1987) is a Ukrainian beauty pageant titleholder who won Miss Ukraine Universe 2010 and represented her country at Miss Universe 2010.

== Miss Universe 2010 ==
She represented Ukraine at Miss Universe 2010 and was third runner-up. Poslavska was the only European to reach the top five.

Awards and achievements
Preceded by Australia Rachael Finch	Miss Universe 3rd Runner-Up; 2010	Succeeded by Philippines Shamcey Supsup
Preceded by Khrystyna Kots-Hotlib	Miss Ukraine Universe; 2010	Succeeded by Olesya Stefanko
