= Anna Andres =

Ukrainian model

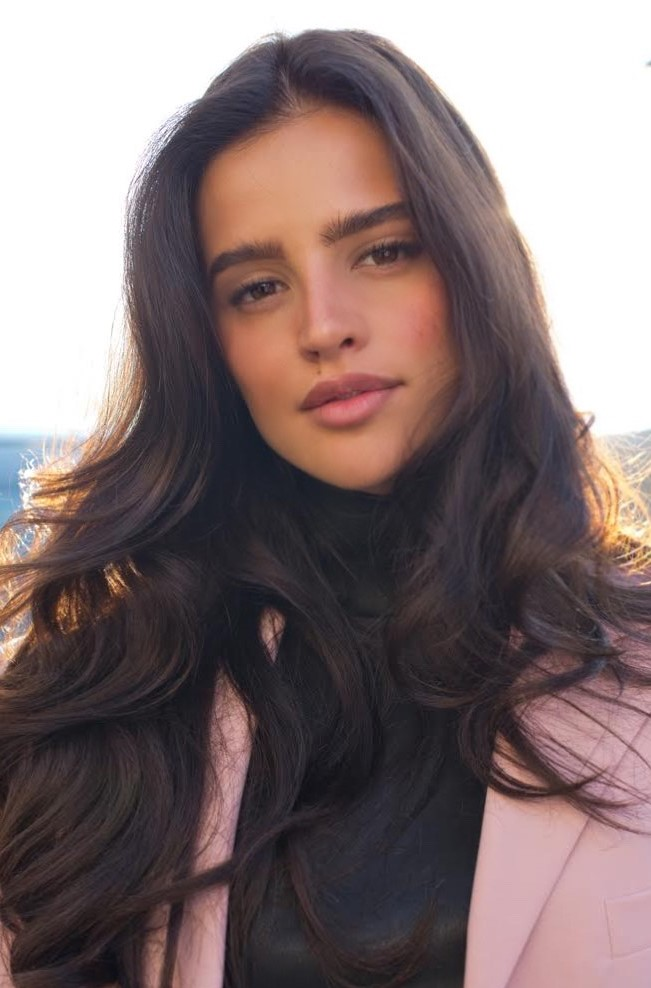
- Born: Anna Oleksandrivna Andres; 17 November 1993 (age 32); Lviv, Ukraine
- Height: 1.78 m (5 ft 10 in)
- Spouse: David Barokas (m. 2020)
- Children: 2
- Beauty pageant titleholder
- Title: Miss Ukraine Universe 2014
- Hair color: Chestnut
- Eye color: Brown
- Major competitions: Miss Ukraine Universe 2014 (Winner; resigned); Miss Universe 2014 (Did not compete)
- Website: https://www.annaandres.com/

Anna Oleksandrivna Andres (Ukrainian: Анна Олександрівна Андрес, born 17 November 1993 in Lviv, Ukraine) is a Ukrainian model, entrepreneur, and fashion influencer. Andres was the winner of the beauty contest Miss Ukraine Universe 2014.

== Personal life ==
Anna Oleksandrivna Andres was born on 17 November 1993 in Lviv, in a Ukrainian family with Polish and Russian roots. Her mother, Victoria, worked as a graphic designer of interiors and exteriors. Her father Oleksandr has a law degree. He has worked in the police. Her parents divorced when she was only 5 years old.

In 2010, she graduated from school in Lviv. In 2016, Anna graduated from Lviv University of Trade and Economics (LUTE) with a law degree. In 2018, she enrolled to the University of Arts: Central Saint Martins in London for the jewelry business course.

In July 2020, she married a French businessman David Barokas. The wedding ceremony took place at a five-star hotel, Du Cap-Eden-Roc at Côte d'Azur. In January 2021, she gave birth to a son, James, and in November 2022, to a second son, Gabriel. In 2026, Anna was naturalized as a French citizen, acquiring French citizenship as a second nationality.

== Career ==
In 2010, Andres became “Vice-miss Lviv”. After this victory, Anna received offers of cooperation from model agencies in Kyiv, Milan, London and Shanghai. While studying at the university, Anna signs a contract with such model agencies as L Models (Kyiv) and Bookings (London), and periodically works as a model.

In April 2014, Andres appears on the cover of L’Officiel Ukraine. On 6 June 2014, Andres was crowned as Miss Ukraine Universe. She then began to participate in the Ukrainian charitable projects, collaborate with the charitable funds that provide assistance to the elderly and children-settlers from the ATO zone in the Donbas. In September 2014, Andres had a photoshoot for GQ Russia and GQ Mexico magazines, for the American brand of evening dresses Sherri Hill in Texas. As the winner of the pageant, Andres must represent her country at the Miss Universe 2014 pageant but for personal reasons, before the pageant take place on 25 January 2015, she publicly refused to represent Ukraine. Thus, she was replaced by the second runner-up, Diana Harkusha.

In 2016, she began to work as a TV presenter on the fashion channel HD Fashion, report from fashion weeks in Milan and Paris, Cannes Film Festival.

In 2017, Andres starred as the main character in the romantic music video on the song Dooset Daram by Arash.

In 2018, Andres collaborated with the British brand Pritch London and created a shared collection of clothes Pritch by Anna Andres.

In April 2019, she founded jewelry brand “Anna Andres Jewelry“. In 2021, she made a collaboration with Ukrainian designer Valeria Kovalskaya, to create the SYNERGY capsule jewelry collection.

In the summer of 2026, she launched Ambermer, a sustainable swimwear and resortwear brand.

Awards and achievements
Preceded by Olga Storozhenko	Miss Ukraine Universe; 2014	Succeeded by Diana Harkusha
