= Anna Durytska =

Ukrainian fashion model

- Анна Дурицька
- Born: 27 November 1991 (age 34); Bila Tserkva, Ukraine
- Occupation: fashion model
- Known for: Former partner of Boris Nemtsov, 2018 Miss Ukraine Universe finalist

Anna Durytska (Ukrainian: Анна Дурицька; born 27 November 1991) is a Ukrainian fashion model, who was a finalist for Miss Ukraine Universe in 2018. She is known for having been in a relationship with Russian politician Boris Nemtsov, and as the only eyewitness to his 2015 assassination.

== Assassination of Boris Nemtsov ==
On 27 February 2015, she was the sole eyewitness to the assassination of Boris Nemtsov. Durytska had been in a relationship for over two years with Nemtsov, a leading opposition figure to Vladimir Putin, and Russian military intervention in Ukraine. She was held under house arrest by Russian police following the murder. The Foreign Ministry of Ukraine stated that it had intervened to secure her release and return from Moscow. Pro-Kremlin Russian news agencies had claimed that she was forced by Nemtsov to have an abortion in Switzerland, in an attempt to implicate her and the Security Service of Ukraine in the murder.

On returning to Kyiv, Ukraine, she went into hiding, under protection of armed guards, assigned to her by the Prosecutor General of Ukraine, after she had received death threats. Pro-Kremlin news agencies leaked provocative photos of Durytska, in an attempt to discredit her, following which she refused to return to Russia to testify in the trial. In December 2018, The Guardian republished Durytska's TV Rain interview from the time of her release, in which she called for the street of the Russian Embassy in London to be renamed in memory of Nemtsov. Washington D.C. had previously done so, under the "D.C. Law 22-92 Boris Nemtsov Plaza Designation Act of 2018".

== Personal life ==
In 2017, she planned to join her friend Ankit Love in London, and attend Central Saint Martins College of Art and Design. In 2022, after Russia launched a full-scale invasion of Ukraine, Durytska fled the country, driving from Kyiv to Sofia, and then arriving to London by air, where she applied for asylum. In April 2022, her friend Ankit Love was detained by Bulgarian police near Godech, while driving a Mercedes-Benz G-Class with Ukrainian licence plates, that belonged to Durytska, back to London for her. The car was filled with her designer clothing and jewellery worth over $100,000. Bulgarian police had confiscated Durytska's car, after detaining and questioning Ankit Love for seven hours.
