= Sofiya Tkachuk =

Ukrainian title holder

Sofia Tkachuk
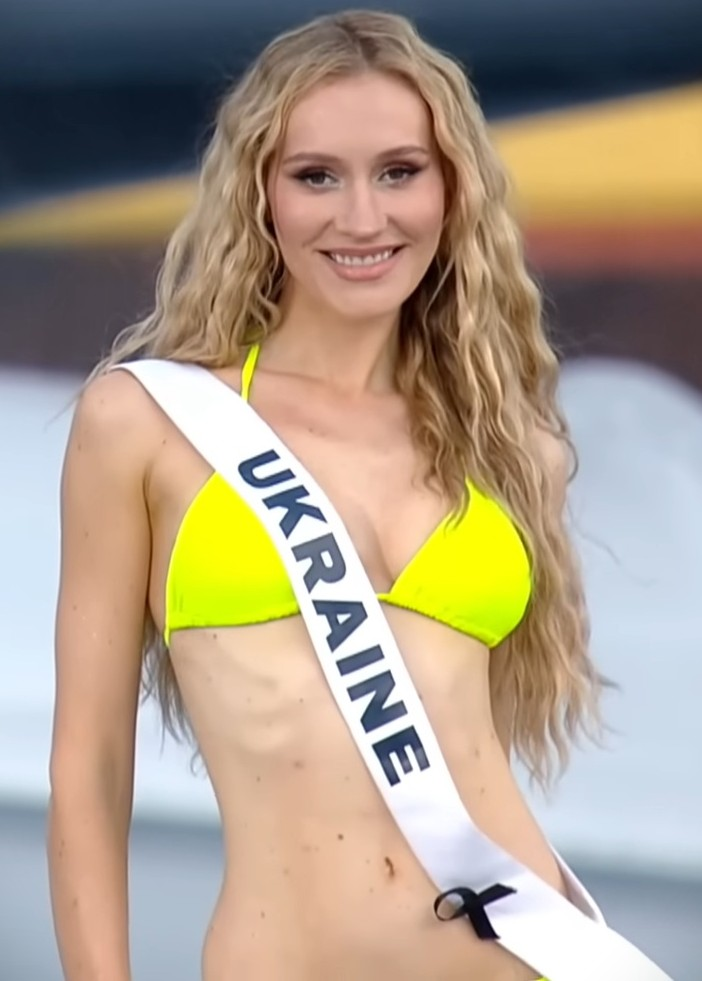
- Tkachuk at Miss Universe 2025
- Born: 16 August 1999 (age 27); Rivne, Ukraine
- Occupations: Entrepreneur, title holder
- Height: 1.77 m (5 ft 9 1/2 in)
- Beauty pageant titleholder
- Title: Miss Ukraine Universe 2025
- Major competitions: Miss Ukraine Universe 2025 (Winner); Miss Universe 2025 (Unplaced)

Sofiya Tkachuk (Ukrainian: Софія Ткачук; born 16 August 1999) is a Ukrainian model and entrepreneur. She was crowned Miss Universe Ukraine 2025 and represented Ukraine at the Miss Universe 2025 pageant.

== Early life and education ==
Sofiya Tkachuk was born in August in 1999 in Rivne. She is fluent in English, Spanish and Ukrainian languages.

Tkachuk holds a Bachelor's Degree from EAE Business School (Barcelona).

== Pageantry ==
On June 9, 2025, Sofiya Tkachuk was awarded the title of Miss Universe Ukraine 2025. Due to the ongoing war in Ukraine, the competition was held in an online voting format among 31 semifinalists. Based on the results of the vote, she advanced to the final of Miss Universe Ukraine 2025. She later won the title following personal interviews and jury voting.

The jury members highlighted her as a charismatic and communicative individual with strong foreign language skills. They also noted her professional background with the UNHCR, and her experience in intercultural engagement—qualities that contribute to the diplomatic mission of the pageant.

Following her victory at Miss Universe Ukraine 2025, Sofiya Tkachuk later went on to represent Ukraine at the Miss Universe 2025 international beauty pageant in Thailand.

Awards and achievements
Preceded by Alina Ponomarenko	Miss Ukraine Universe; 2025	Succeeded by Anna Nikonova
