= Eleonora Masalab =

Ukrainian beauty pageant contestant

Eleonora Masalab (Ukrainian: Елеонора Масалаб; born October 12, 1988) is a Ukrainian model and beauty pageant titleholder who winner of Miss Ukraine Universe 2008.

She represented Ukraine in Miss Universe 2008, which took place in Vietnam, on July 14, 2008. She did not place in the top 15. She was previously the runner-up in Miss Model of the World 2005–2006, and competed in Miss Ukraine 2007.

Preceded by Lyudmila Bikmullina	Miss Ukraine Universe; 2008	Succeeded by Khrystyna Kots-Hotlib
