= Olga Storozhenko =

Ukrainian actress, model and pageant titleholder

- Born: Olga Storozhenko; 14 April 1992 (age 34); Trostianets, Vinnytsia Oblast, Ukraine
- Height: 1.76 m (5 ft 9 in)
- Beauty pageant titleholder
- Title: Miss Ukraine Universe 2013
- Hair color: Dark Brown
- Eye color: Green
- Major competitions: Miss Ukraine Universe 2013; (Winner); Miss Universe 2013; (Top 10)

Olga Storozhenko (born 14 April 1992) is a Ukrainian actress, model, teacher and beauty pageant titleholder who won Miss Ukraine Universe 2013. She later represented Ukraine at Miss Universe 2013, she where placed in the Top 10 semifinalist.

== Early life ==
Olga Storozhenko is a senior at the Vinnytsia State Pedagogical University.

== Miss Ukraine Universe 2013 ==
Olga Storozhenko from Vinnitsa was crowned Miss Universe Ukraine 2013 by the outgoing queen Anastasia Chernova on 4 September 2013 at Fairmont Grand Hotel in Kyiv. The 21-year-old raven haired beauty was represented Ukraine in Miss Universe 2013 pageant.

== Miss Universe 2013 ==
She competed at Miss Universe 2013 where she became the fifth Miss Ukraine to advance to semifinals and finished in the Top 10. The eventual winner was Gabriela Isler of Venezuela.

Awards and achievements
Preceded by Anastasia Chernova	Miss Ukraine Universe; 2013	Succeeded by Anna Andres
