= Khrystyna Kots-Hotlib =

Khrystyna Kots-Hotlib Христина Коц-Готліб
- Birth name: Кристина Валерьевна Коц-Готлиб
- Born: 2 May 1983 (age 41); Donetsk, Ukrainian SSR, Soviet Union
- Origin: Ukraine
- Genres: pop
- Occupations: singer; actress
- Years active: 2002–present

Khrystyna Kots-Hotlib (Ukrainian: Христина Коц-Готліб) (born 2 May 1983 in Donetsk, Ukraine) is a Ukrainian singer and beauty pageant titleholder who was crowned Miss Ukraine Universe 2009 and represented Ukraine in Miss Universe 2009 and was a member of the pop Ukrainian girl trio VIA-Gra (ВИА Гра).

== Biography ==
Since childhood, she was involved in dance and rhythmic gymnastics and became a master of sports. When Khrystyna was 15 years old, she won the city's beauty and talent contest. As a student of economics, Khrystyna began to participate in beauty contests, where she won numerous titles. Among them: "Miss Donbass-2003", nomination "Miss Donetsk"; "Miss Donbass 2004", nomination "Vice-Miss Decade"; "Miss international Black Sea 2003". A modeling career developed just as rapidly. Christina participated in the fashion festival "Moda-Lux-2004" at "Donbass Palace", worked in the defile of the boutiques "Pani & Fashion", "Mexx", in the defile of Diana Dorozhkina. She graduated from DonNUET with honors, completed the master of sports program in rhythmic gymnastics, received an excellent master's degree in international economics. After graduation, she began to actively learning how to sing, choreography, and took acting lessons.

== Nu Virgos ==
In February 2006, the group starts filming their new video for the "Обмани, Но Останься" (Cheat, But Stay) song with Khrystyna. Khrystyna's first performance as a member of the group took place in Kyiv on March 24 at the Oasis Club. The renewed line-up of the band took part in a photo shoot for the May issue of the men's magazine "XXL". In April 2006, Khrystyna leaves the group.

Preceded by Eleonora Masalab	Miss Ukraine Universe; 2009	Succeeded by Anna Poslavska
