= Bolshaya Dmitrovka =

Bolshaya Dmitrovka Большая Дмитровка
- Khutor
- Location within Voronezh Oblast Location within Russia
- Coordinates: 50°29′N 39°38′E
- Country: Russia
- Region: Voronezh Oblast
- District: Podgorensky District
- Time zone: UTC+3:00

Bolshaya Dmitrovka (Russian: Больша́я Дми́тровка) is a rural locality (a khutor) in Bolshedmitrovskoye Rural Settlement, Podgorensky District, Voronezh Oblast, Russia. The population was 98 as of 2010.

== Geography ==
Bolshaya Dmitrovka is located 16 km north of Podgorensky (the district's administrative centre) by road. Krasyukovsky is the nearest rural locality.
