= Oleksandra Nikolayenko =

Ukrainian model and actress (born 1981)

- Born: 3 July 1981 (age 45); Budapest, Hungary
- Occupations: Actress; model
- Spouse: Phil Ruffin

Oleksandra Nikolayenko-Ruffin (Ukrainian: Олександра Ніколаєнко; born 3 July 1981) is a Ukrainian actress, model and beauty pageant titleholder.

== Education ==
She studied at the Odesa National Law Academy, and worked for Savrox Models Agency in Odesa. She takes an active part in charitable projects. She speaks Ukrainian, Russian and English.

== Pageantry ==
She held the "Miss Odesa", "Miss Ukraine South", "Miss Ukraine", "Miss Student", "Miss Tourism-Europe", "First vice-Miss Tourism-Planet", "Miss American Dream" and "Miss Tourism International" titles. She represented Ukraine at Miss World 2001 and placed among the top ten. Later, she was the 2004 Miss Ukraine Universe winner and represented Ukraine at Miss Universe 2004 in Ecuador 2004. She has received more beauty awards than any other woman in Ukraine. She was invited to judge the Miss Universe 2005 finals in Thailand.

== Life after pageants ==
Donald Trump introduced then-72-year old Phil Ruffin, to Oleksandra Nikolayenko — like Melania Trump, a much younger former model. The couple were married in 2008 at Mar-a-Lago, Trump's private club in Palm Beach, Florida, with him as best man. The men's wives are quite close, Ruffin has said, "like peas in a pod."

They have two children: Richard William Ruffin (born April 2010) and daughter Malena (born 2013). She is currently the National Director Chairman of Miss Ukraine Universe.

She also designed the "Oleksandra Spa & Salon" at the Treasure Island Hotel and Casino in Paradise, which is owned by her husband.

Preceded by Olena Shcherban	Miss Ukraine; 2001	Succeeded by Iryna Udovenko
Preceded by Lilja Kopytova	Miss Ukraine Universe; 2004	Succeeded by Juliya Chernyshova
