= Miss Ukraine Universe =

National beauty pageant competition in Ukraine

Miss Ukraine Universe Organization Міс Всесвіт Україна
- Formation: 2006; 20 years ago
- Purpose: Beauty pageant
- Headquarters: Kyiv
- Location: Ukraine
- Official language: Ukrainian
- President: Anna Filimonova
- Affiliations: Miss Universe
- Website: www.missukraineuniverse.com.ua

Miss Ukraine Universe (Ukrainian: Міс Всесвіт Україна, romanized: Mis Vsesvit Ukraina) is a national beauty pageant in Ukraine. The winner represents Ukraine at Miss Universe.

The pageant has existed since 2006, after the Miss Ukraine Organization lost the Miss Universe franchise to Oleksandra Nikolayenko. The winner of the pageant represents Ukraine at Miss Universe. Previously, the representative of Ukraine was chosen by the Miss Ukraine Committee.

The current Miss Ukraine Universe is Anna Nikonova from Kyiv.

== History ==
The Miss Ukraine Universe pageant was founded in 2006 by Oleksandra Nikolayenko.

Natalie Glebova, Miss Universe 2005 was invited by Nikolayenko to visit Ukraine to promote the Miss Ukraine Universe contest in 2006. The inaugural contest was won by Inna Tsymbalyuk.

In April 2016 Nikolayenko sold the pageant. A foreign-owned international company became the new owner of the Miss Ukraine Universe beauty contest.

The current Miss Universe license holder in Ukraine and the National Director of the pageant is Anna Filimonova.

== Selection of the winner ==
Participants of the pageant should be citizens of Ukraine and have from 18 to 28 years of age.

The jury members of the contest are well-known film and television stars, athletes, entrepreneurs, and philanthropists. The jury and the honored guests of the Miss Ukraine Universe pageant: Naomi Campbell, Dolph Lundgren, Jean-Claude Van Damme, Sylvester Stallone, Jason Statham, Joan Collins, Thomas Anders, Eric Trump, Andrii Shevchenko, Snizhana Onopko, Oleksandr Dolgopolov, Caroline Wozniacki, Paula Shugart, Miss Universe-2008 Dayana Mendoza, Miss Universe-2005 Natalie Glebova, Fadil Berisha, Sherri Hill and others.

== Titleholders ==
- : Declared as the Winner
- : Finished as a runner-up or top 5/6 qualification
- : Finished as one of the finalists or semifinalists
- : Finished as a special awards winner

The winner of Miss Ukraine Universe represents her country at the Miss Universe. On occasion, when the winner does not qualify (due to age) for either contest, a runner-up is sent. Before 2006 Miss Ukraine pageant sent delegates to Miss Universe pageant under Lilia Kuznetsova directorship.

Year	Oblast	Miss Ukraine Universe	Placement at Miss Universe	Special Award(s)	Notes
Anna Filimonova directorship — a franchise holder to Miss Universe from 2016
2026	Kyiv	Anna Nikonova	TBA	TBA	
2025	Rivne	Sofiya Tkachuk	Unplaced		
2024	Odesa	Alina Ponomarenko	Unplaced		
2023	Kyiv	Angelina Usanova	Unplaced	Voice For Change (Silver Winner)	Later, Miss Eco International 2024.
2022	Chernihiv	Viktoria Apanasenko	Unplaced	Spirit of Carnival Award; Best National Costume	Appointed — Due to the impact of Russian invasion of Ukraine, the First Runner-up of 2021 crowned as Miss Ukraine Universe 2022.
2021	Dnipropetrovsk	Hanna Nepliakh	Unplaced		
2020	Kyiv	Yelyzaveta Yastremska	Unplaced		Appointed — Due to the impact of COVID-19 pandemic in Ukraine, the First Runner-up of 2019 crowned as the Miss Ukraine Universe 2020.
2019	Zaporizhzhia	Anastasia Subbota	Unplaced		
2018	Odesa	Karina Zhosan	Unplaced		
2017	Kyiv	Yana Krasnikova	Unplaced		
2016	Kyiv	Alena Spodynyuk	Unplaced		
Oleksandra Nikolayenko directorship — a franchise holder to Miss Universe between 2016―2015
2015	Kyiv	Anna Vergelskaya	Unplaced		
2014	Kharkiv	Diana Harkusha	2nd Runner-up		Appointed — She was given the title after the original winner refused to compete at Miss Universe.
2014	Lviv	Anna Andres	Did not compete		Resigned — Anna Andres withdrew from the pageant for personal reasons.
2013	Vinnytsia	Olga Storozhenko	Top 10		
2012	Kharkiv	Anastasia Chernova	Unplaced		
2011	Odesa	Olesya Stefanko	1st Runner-up		
2010	Kherson	Anna Poslavska	3rd Runner-up		
2009	Donetsk	Khrystyna Kots-Hotlib	Unplaced		
2008	Kharkiv	Eleonora Masalab	Unplaced		
2007	Kharkiv	Lyudmila Bikmullina	Top 15		
2006	Chernivtsi	Inna Tsymbalyuk	Top 20		
Lilia Kuznetsova directorship — a franchise holder to Miss Universe between 1995―2004
2005	Kyiv	Juliya Chernyshova	Unplaced		
2004	Odesa	Oleksandra Nikolayenko	Unplaced		President of Miss Ukraine Universe from 2006 to 2015.
2003	Kyiv	Lilja Kopytova	Unplaced		
2002	Kyiv	Liliana Gorova	Unplaced		
2001	Zaporizhzhia	Yuliya Linova	Unplaced		
2000	Dnipropetrovsk	Natalie Shvachko	Unplaced		
1999	Kyiv	Zhanna Pikhulya	Unplaced		
1998	Kharkiv	Olena Spirina	Unplaced		
1997	Kharkiv	Natalia Nadtochey	Unplaced		
1996	Kyiv	Irina Borisova	Unplaced		
1995	Kyiv	Irina Chernomaz	Unplaced		

=== Oblast Rankings ===
Oblast	Titles	Year
Kyiv	11	1995, 1996, 1999, 2002, 2003, 2005, 2015, 2016, 2017, 2020, 2023
Kharkiv Oblast	6	1997, 1998, 2007, 2008, 2012, 2014
Odesa Oblast	4	2004, 2011, 2018, 2024
Dnipropetrovsk Oblast	2	2000, 2021
Zaporizhzhia Oblast	2	2001, 2019
Rivne Oblast	1	2025
Chernihiv Oblast	1	2022
Lviv Oblast	1	2014
Vinnytsia Oblast	1	2013
Kherson Oblast	1	2010
Donetsk Oblast	1	2009
Chernivtsi Oblast	1	2006

== See also ==
- Miss Universe
- Ukraine at major beauty pageants
