= Karin Refos =

Surinamese entrepreneur

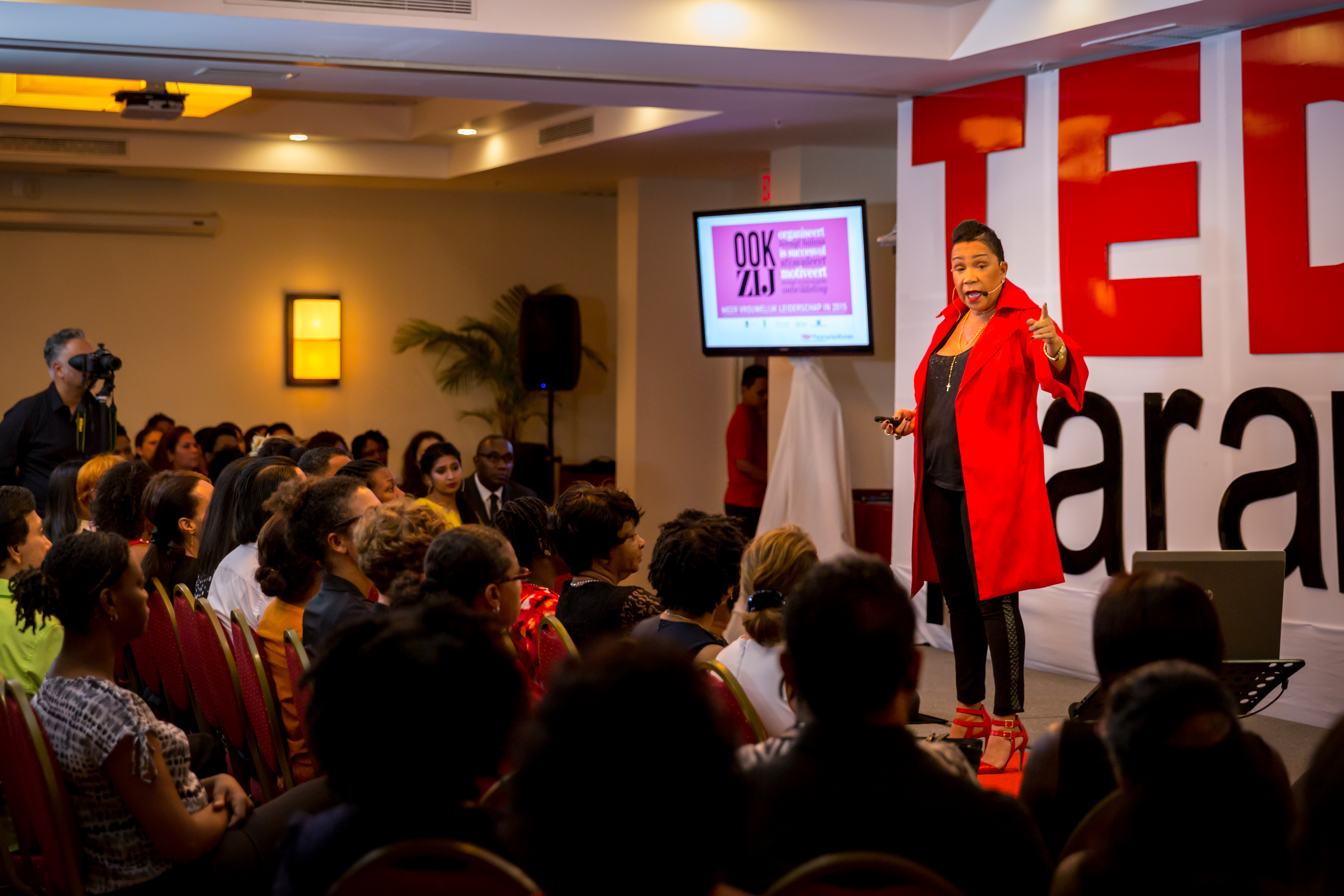
- Refos at TEDxParamariboWomen, 2015
- Born: Karin B. Refos; 1958 (age 67–68)

Karin B. Refos (born 1958) is a Surinamese former model, entrepreneur, and public speaker on child welfare and women's rights. She founded the brand consultancy STAS International.

== Career ==
=== Modeling and music ===
Refos' father, Ewald "Slim" Refos, was director of the mining company Suralco and president of the Surinamese Football Association. Her brother Erik Refos became a musician.

Refos participated in the 1978 Miss Suriname pageant. She was the second runner-up, with Peggy Ann von Stein as first runner-up and Garance Rustwijk as the title winner. The newspaper De Vrije Stem described Refos as "a personality that was very much the favorite of the room". In that same year, she co-founded the SuriPop music festival. The first edition took place in Theater Thalia in Paramaribo.

In 2006, Refos and Jörgen Raymann set up the National Folk Music School, recruiting prominent music teachers and sponsors. The school initially operated out of the Grote Pastorie building in Paramaribo. From 2006 to 2017, she was chairman of the school.

=== Business ===
In the eighties, Refos lived in Amsterdam. She was the representative of a skincare brand for women with dark skin, and taught courses for cosmeticians. She then moved to Oranjestad, Aruba in the early 1990s. As of 1993, she was an instructor for knowledge development courses offered to government employees.

While living in Oranjestad, Refos founded STAS Caribe around 1994. One of the company's first projects was with the Aruba Trade & Industry Association (ATIA), where Refos organised programs to encourage remigration of Arubans from the Netherlands. In Paramaribo, she established STAS International with divisions of brand positioning, management, public relations, and events. Through STAS, she was an advisor for Paramaribo's "City of Smiles" tourism campaign (2010) and for the new logo of the Central Bank of Suriname (2015).

In 2016, Refos received the "Communicator of Suriname" Award from the Suriname Centre for Communication & PR.

== Public work ==
While leading STAS, Refos began working on issues of child welfare and women's rights.

=== Children Visibly Safe ===
In 2008, Refos became chairman of the Media Board for Children's Rights and led the national campaign Children Visibly Safe. In the preceding years, figures for child abuse had risen dramatically. In response, the board asked media houses to refuse offensive advertisements, video clips, and songs. In 2014, she designed the billboards and logo for the promotional campaign of the Child's Rights Office, which is part of the Ministry of Social Affairs.

=== Pink Ribbon ===
Around 2010, Refos was diagnosed with breast cancer. After recovering, she founded the Pink Ribbon Suriname Foundation in January 2012 to raise awareness of the disease. Her campaign included former boxing champion and actress Lucia Rijker. The foundation has continued to organise events, including a Pink Ribbonloop throughout the country. Refos later stepped down as the leader of the foundation, but was named honorary President.

=== Women in politics ===
Together with Carla Bakboord, Betty Cederboom, and Nadia Raveles, Refos founded the Women's Rights Centre (WRC) Foundation on 27 January 1997.

When Refos was on a trade mission to Indonesia in 2013, she discovered that there were no women between the 21 members and alternate members of the Board of the Chamber of Commerce and Factories (KKF). To change this, she decided to participate in the KKF elections of December 2015. She denounced a 1962 bylaw that reserved day-to-day administration for the senior members, effectively excluding young members. Refos filed her own list of candidates for Other Trade and Intermediaries, one of the eight branches of the Chamber. Her list consisted of four female and four male candidates. However, the competing list of Rashied Doekhi won by a large margin.

Prior to the 2015 Surinamese general election, Refos organised the More Female Leadership campaign. Beginning in May 2014, her campaign consisted of the distribution of posters and the organization of debates between political leaders. There were 80 female candidates for the National Assembly (DNA), of whom 13 (25% of the Assembly) were eventually elected. The new cabinet had 3 women. Refos organised the Balance campaign for the 2020 elections to pursue gender parity in candidate lists. Some parties did nominate such lists. This time, 17 women entered the Assembly (33%) and 6 women joined the new cabinet (35%).
