= Miss Korea 2009 =

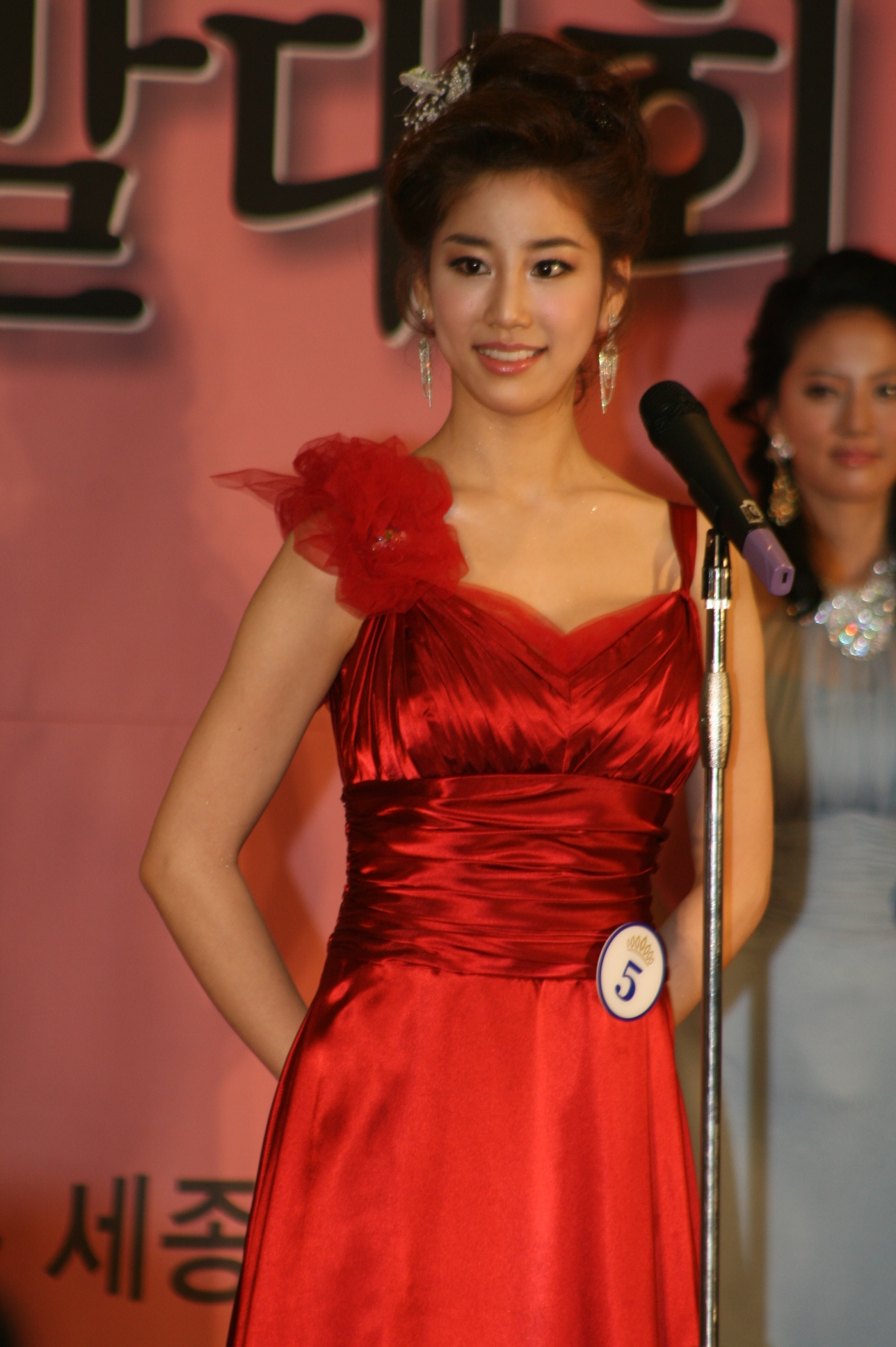
- Date: July 8, 2009
- Venue: Sejong Center, Seoul, South Korea
- Entrants: 56
- Winner: Kim Joo-ri

Miss Korea 2009 was a beauty pageant that was held on July 8, 2009 at the Sejong Center, sponsored by the Korean newspaper HanKook Daily News. Approximately 56 women from around the world competed in Seoul, South Korea and seven, equivalent to semi-finalists were selected by a panel of judges. The 1st-place winner, Kim Joo-ri, was crowned the official Miss Korea and later competed in Miss World 2009 and Miss Universe 2010. Additionally, there were two sun (선) finalists, known as the 1st and 2nd runners-up respectively. The 1st Runner Up competed in Miss International 2009 and the 2nd Runner Up competed in Miss Earth 2009.

== Results ==
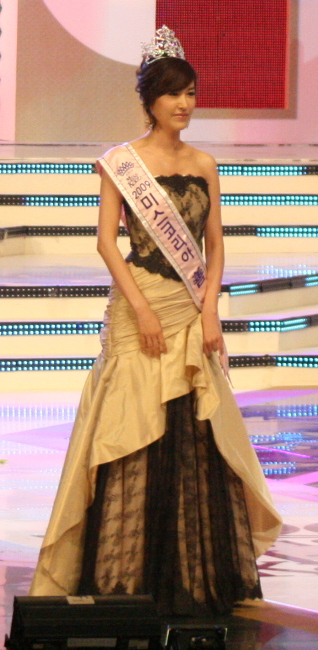
2009 Miss Korea Sun Cha Ye-lin.

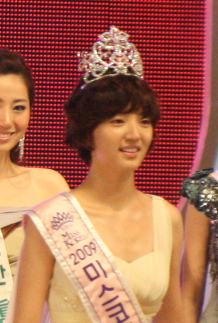
2009 Miss Korea Sun Seo Eun-mi.

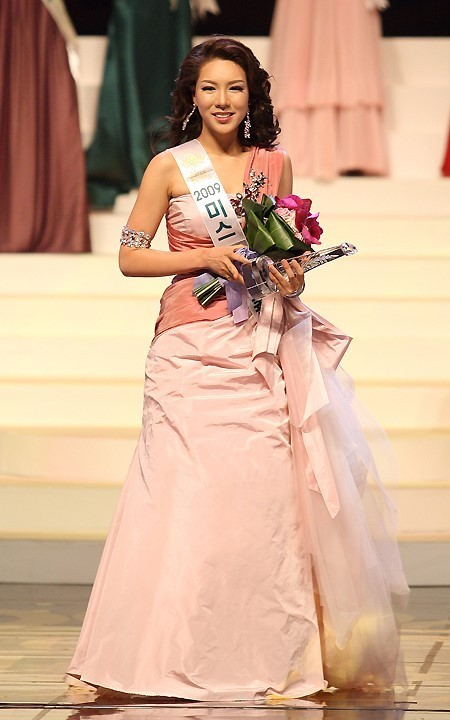
2009 Miss Korea Y Star Sa Gong-Jin.

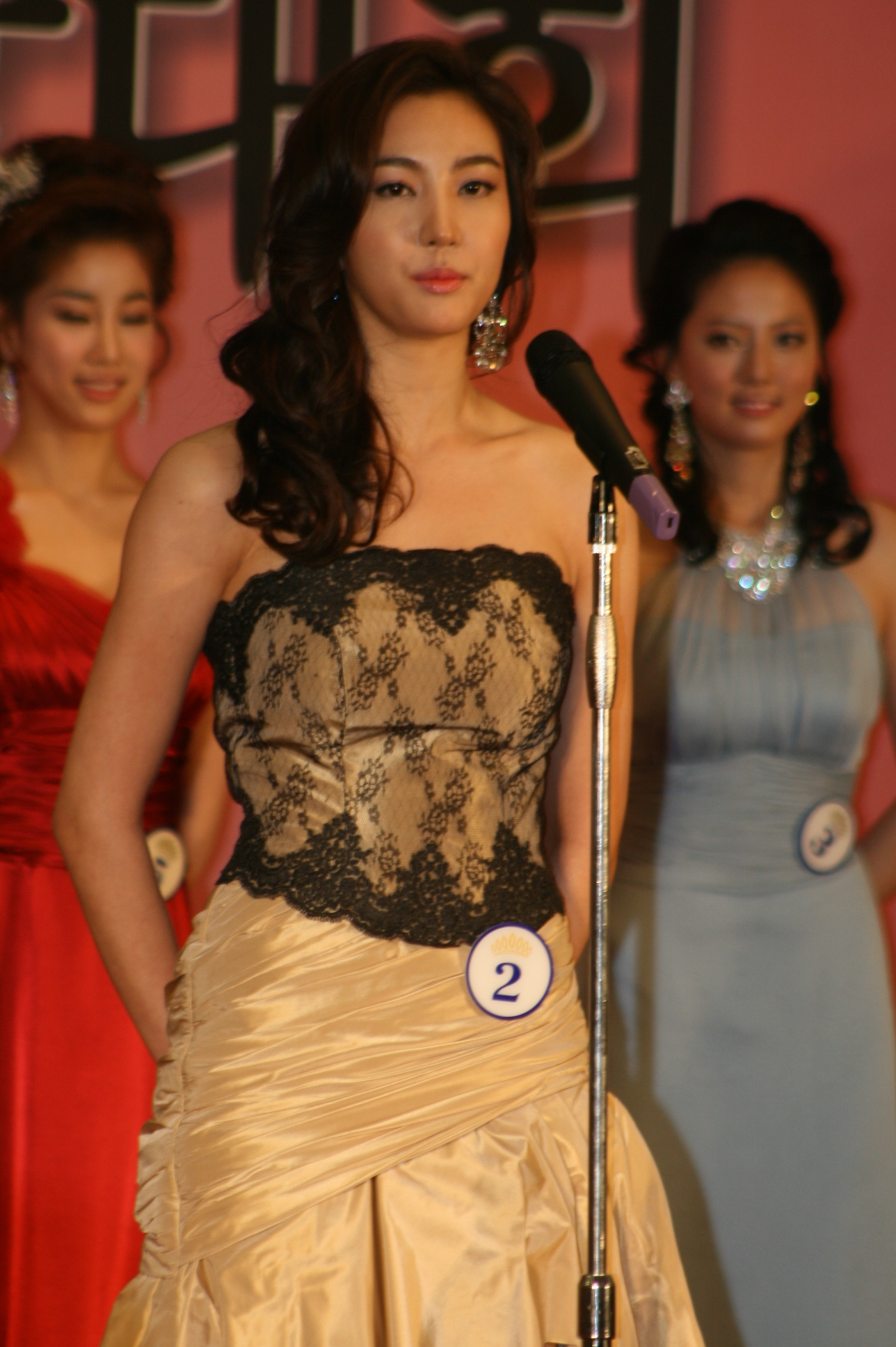
2009 Miss Korea Mi Park Ye-ju.

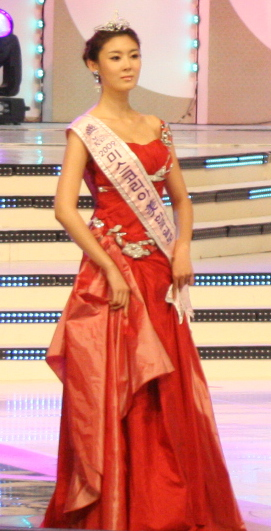
2009 Miss Korea Mi Choi Ji-hee.

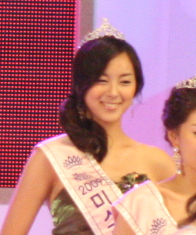
2009 Miss Korea Mi Lee Seul-gi.

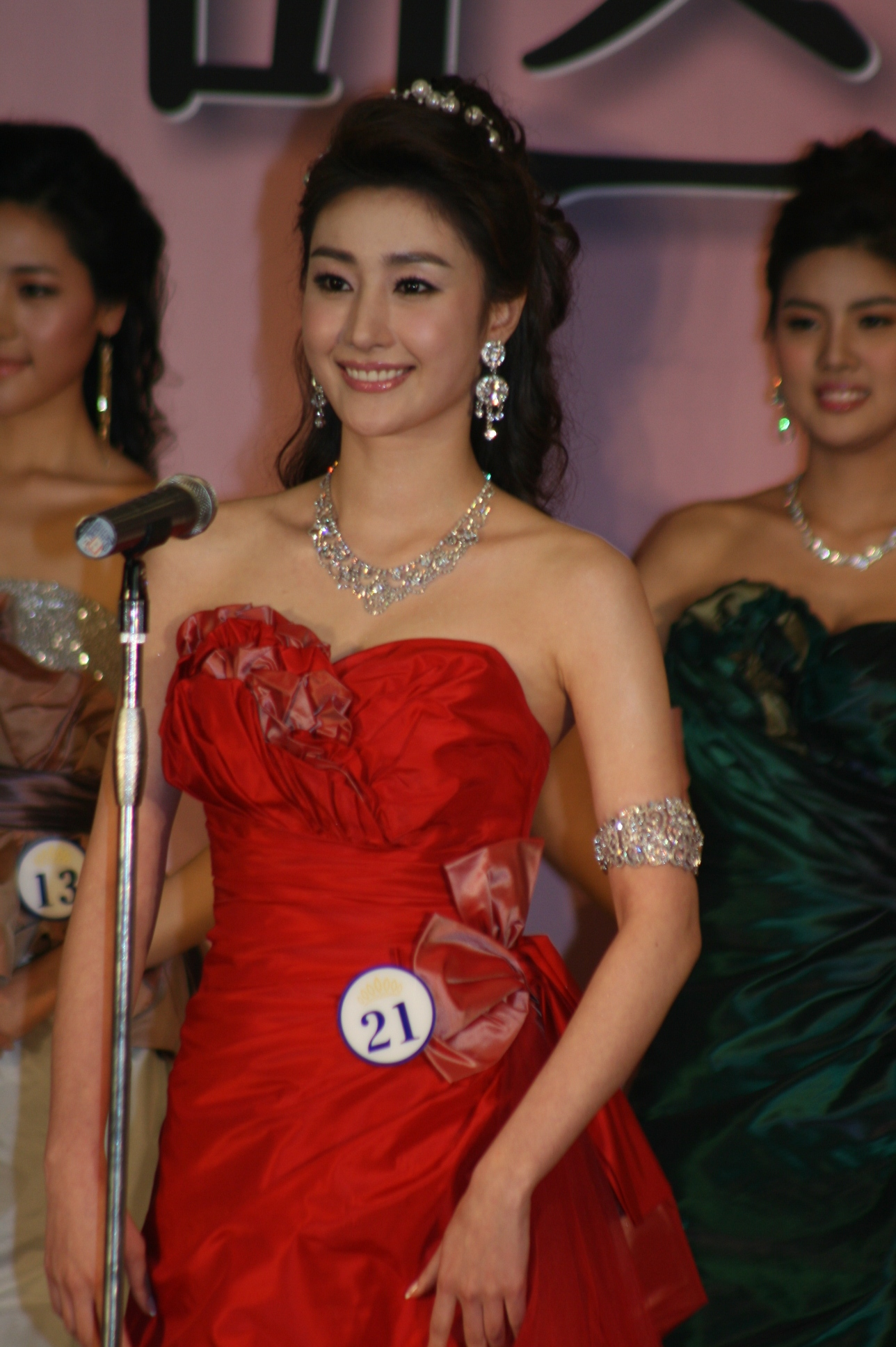
2009 Miss Korea Seoul Sun Park Si-won.

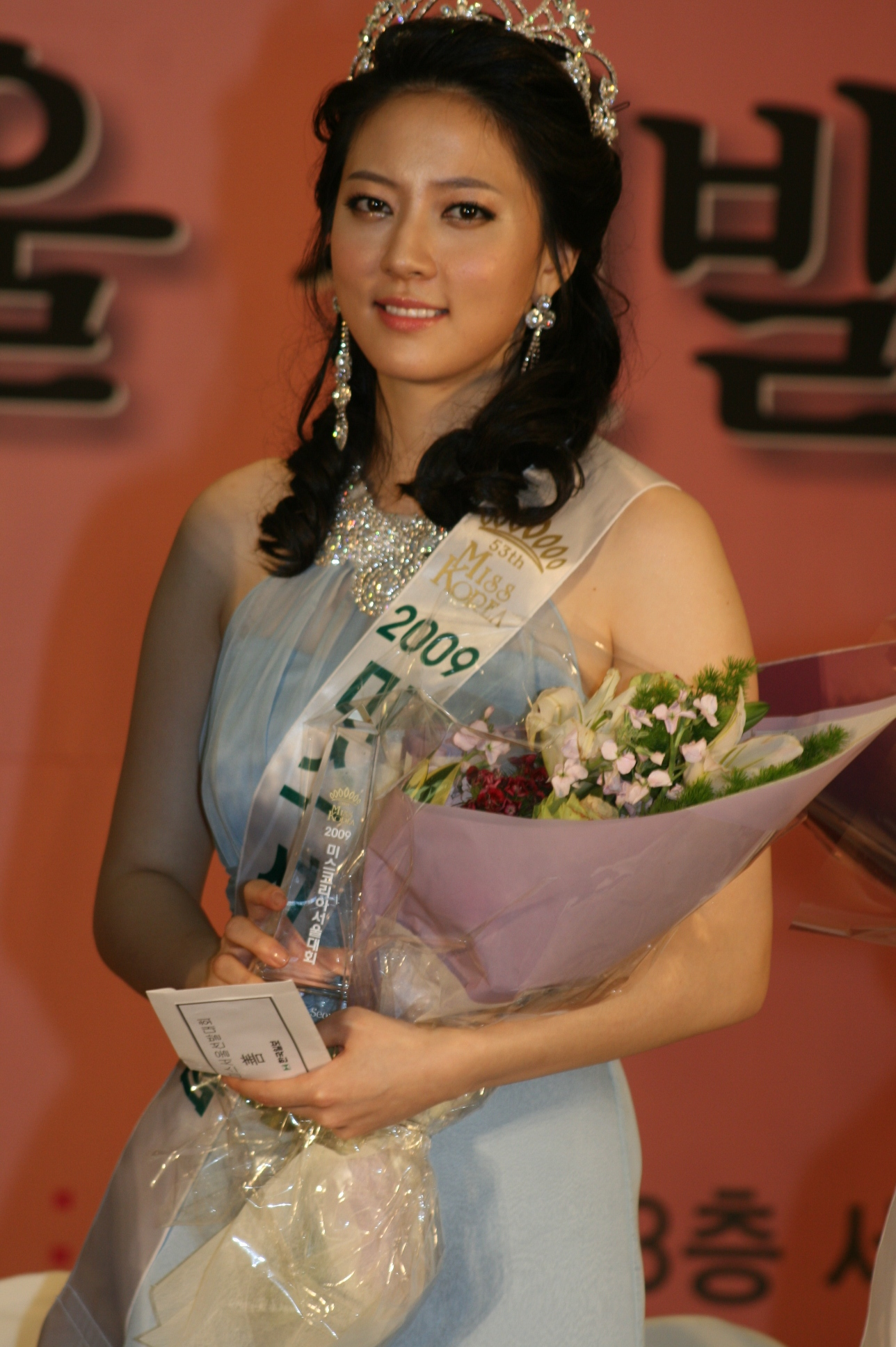
2009 Miss Korea Seoul Sun Wang Ji-hye.

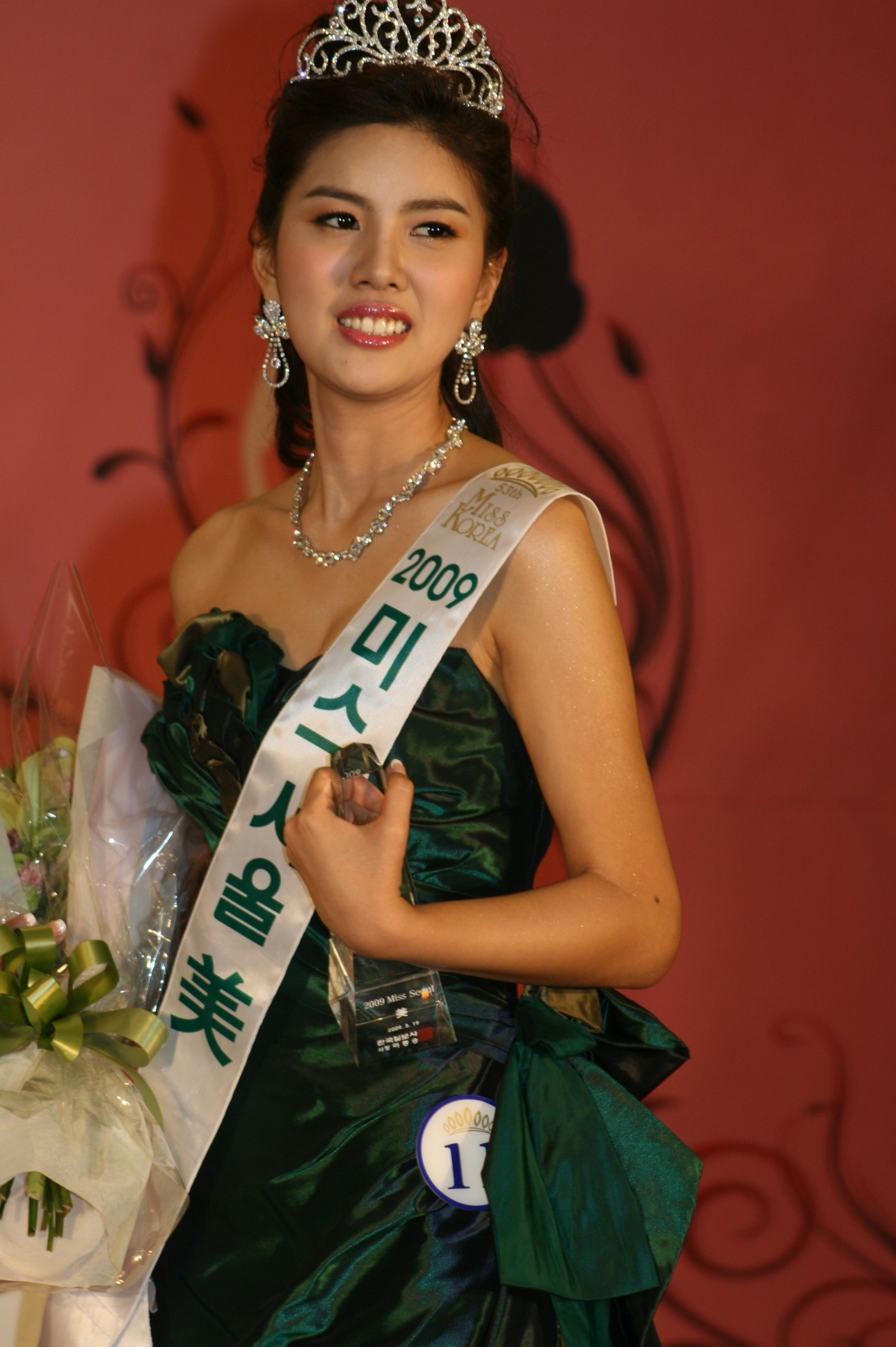
2009 Miss Korea Seoul Mi Kim Eun-soo.

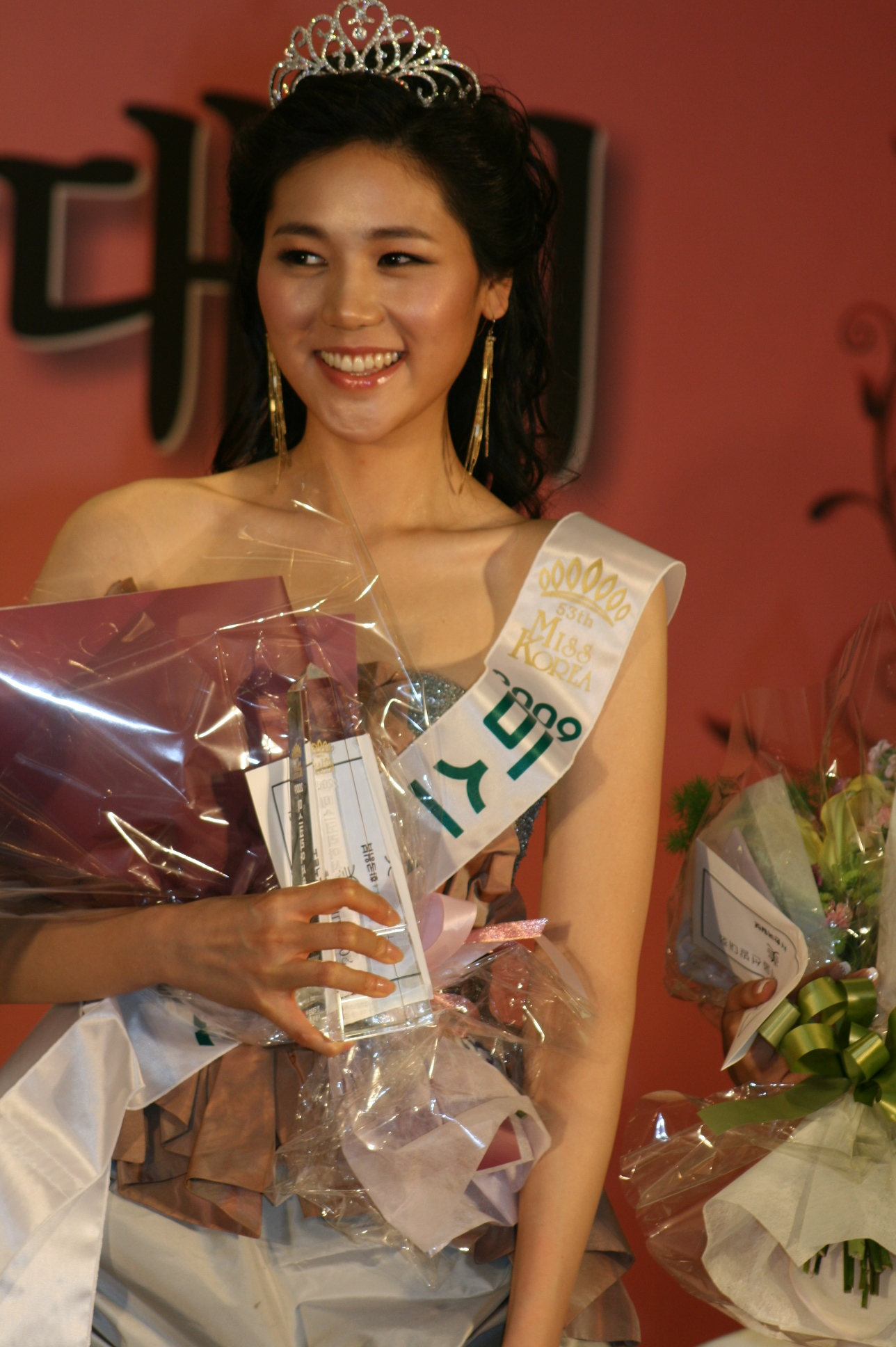
2009 Miss Korea Seoul Mi Lee Yun-kyung.

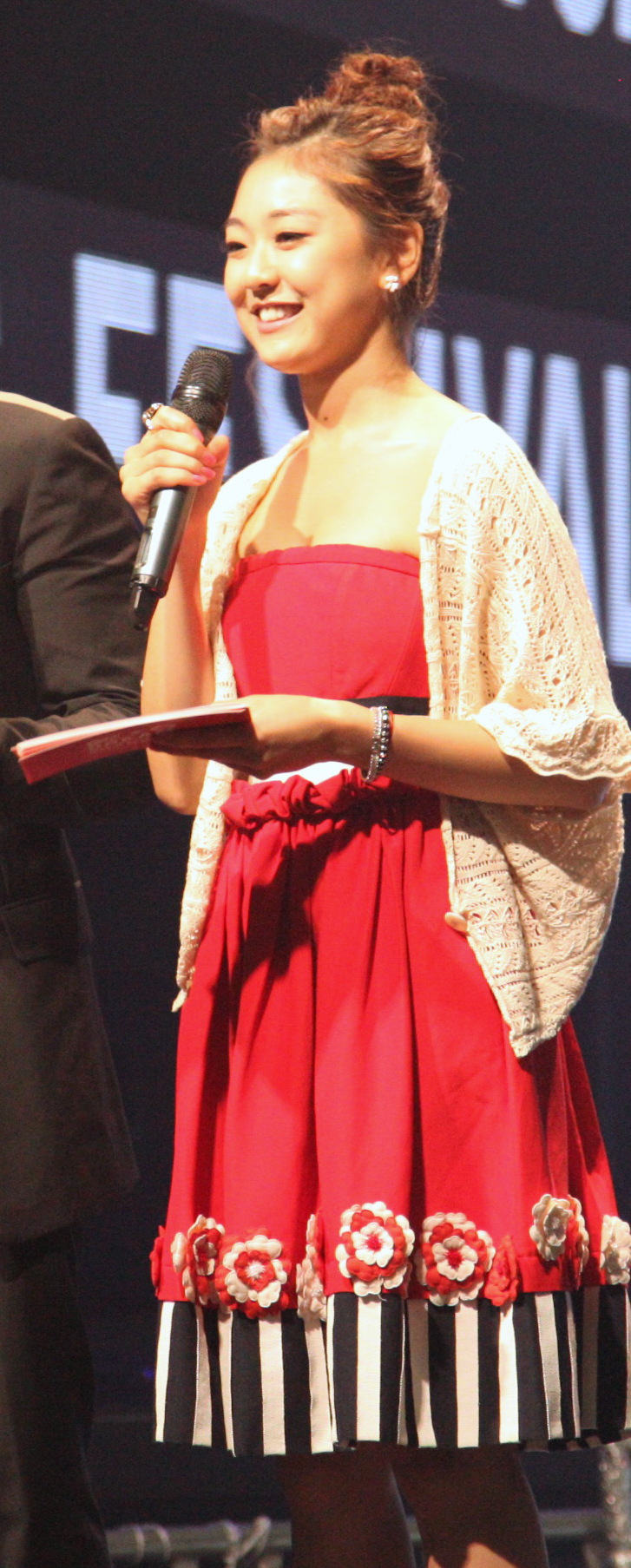
2009 Miss Korea Japan Jin Kwon Ri-se.

=== Placements ===
Final results	Contestant
Miss Korea Jin/Miss Korea 2009	김주리 Kim Joo-ri
Miss Korea Sun/1st Runner Up	차예린 Cha Ye-lin
Miss Korea Sun/1st Runner Up	서은미 Seo Eun-mi
Miss Korea Y Star	사공진 Sa Gong-Jin
Miss Korea Mi Natural F&P/2nd Runner Up	박예주 Park Ye-ju
Miss Korea Mi Hankook Ilbo/2nd Runner Up	최지희 Choi Ji-hee
Miss Korea Mi/2nd Runner Up	유수정 You Su-jung
Miss Korea Mi/2nd Runner Up	이슬기 Lee Seul-gi

=== List of Contestants ===
#	Name	Age	Height	Hometown
1	차예린 Cha Ye-lin	23	1.71 m (5 ft 7 1/2 in)	Jeonbuk Jin
2	권하나 Kwon Hana	24	1.77 m (5 ft 9 1/2 in)	Jeonbuk Sun
3	양국화 Yang Guk-hwa	25	1.69 m (5 ft 6 1/2 in)	Washington Jin
4	음소희 Eum So-hee	21	1.76 m (5 ft 9 1/2 in)	Jeonbuk Mi
5	박예주 Park Ye-ju	22	1.73 m (5 ft 8 in)	Seoul Mi
6	신현아 Shin Hyeon-ah	21	1.76 m (5 ft 9 1/2 in)	Chungbuk Mi
7	원종빈 Won Jong-bin	23	1.73 m (5 ft 8 in)	Chungbuk Jin
8	김지혜 Kim Ji-hye	20	1.75 m (5 ft 9 in)	Los Angeles Sun
9	김주리 Kim Joo-ri	21	1.71 m (5 ft 7 1/2 in)	Seoul Jin
10	문수진 Moon Su-jin	25	1.66 m (5 ft 5 1/2 in)	Jeju Mi
11	공지영 Gong Ji-young	22	1.69 m (5 ft 6 1/2 in)	Daegu Sun
12	손성민 Son Seong-min	20	1.71 m (5 ft 7 1/2 in)	Gyeongbuk Sun
13	이현주 Lee Hyeon-ju	20	1.71 m (5 ft 7 1/2 in)	Incheon Jin
14	김초록 Kim Cho-rok	23	1.65 m (5 ft 5 in)	Gwangju & Jeonnam Mi
15	왕지혜 Wang Ji-hye	23	1.68 m (5 ft 6 in)	Seoul Sun
16	문경은 Moon Kyung-eun	21	1.64 m (5 ft 4 1/2 in)	Gyeongbuk Jin
17	서은미 Seo Eun-mi	22	1.74 m (5 ft 8 1/2 in)	Daegu Jin
18	오다혜 Oh Da-hye	21	1.70 m (5 ft 7 in)	Gyeonggi Sun
19	정승원 Jeong Seung-won	21	1.71 m (5 ft 7 1/2 in)	Denver Jin
20	이사라 Lee Sara	22	1.73 m (5 ft 8 in)	Texas Jin
21	김은수 Kim Eun-su	23	1.70 m (5 ft 7 in)	Seoul Mi
22	김주영 Kim Ju-young	24	1.69 m (5 ft 6 1/2 in)	Gyeongnam Jin
23	한여울 Han Yeo-wool	23	1.71 m (5 ft 7 1/2 in)	Daejeon & Chungnam Sun
24	박음정 Park Eum-jeong	23	1.72 m (5 ft 7 1/2 in)	Busan Jin
25	박수현 Park Su-hyeon	22	1.67 m (5 ft 5 1/2 in)	Ulsan Mi
26	이윤경 Lee Yun-kyung	21	1.72 m (5 ft 7 1/2 in)	Seoul Mi
27	권리세 Kwon Ri-se	18	1.63 m (5 ft 4 in)	Japan Jin
28	박시원 Park Si-won	25	1.72 m (5 ft 7 1/2 in)	Seoul Sun
29	이유미 Lee Yu-mi	22	1.74 m (5 ft 8 1/2 in)	Gyeongnam Mi
30	유수정 Yoo Su-jeong	22	1.70 m (5 ft 7 in)	Daejeon & Chungnam Jin
31	김혜린 Kim Hye-rin	22	1.70 m (5 ft 7 in)	Los Angeles Jin
32	김수란 Kim Su-ran	25	1.64 m (5 ft 4 1/2 in)	New York City Sun
33	김유진 Kim Yu-jin	19	1.69 m (5 ft 6 1/2 in)	New York City Jin
34	박국선 Park Guk-seon	24	1.69 m (5 ft 6 1/2 in)	Incheon Sun
35	조혜민 Cho Hye-min	24	1.67 m (5 ft 5 1/2 in)	Daejeon & Chungnam Mi
36	이슬기 Lee Seul-gi	21	1.77 m (5 ft 9 1/2 in)	Gangwon Jin
37	이동인 Lee Dong-in	24	1.68 m (5 ft 6 in)	Ulsan Sun
38	장지영 Jang Ji-young	21	1.72 m (5 ft 7 1/2 in)	Busan Sun
39	사공진 Sa Gong-jin	20	1.67 m (5 ft 5 1/2 in)	Gyeongnam Sun
40	이예은 Lee Ye-eun	21	1.69 m (5 ft 6 1/2 in)	Chungbuk Sun
41	조수진 Cho Su-jin	22	1.73 m (5 ft 8 in)	Gyeonggi Mi
42	오지인 Oh Ji-in	21	1.73 m (5 ft 8 in)	Gyeongbuk Mi
43	안선영 Ahn Seon-young	22	1.69 m (5 ft 6 1/2 in)	Gangwon Sun
44	송미림 Song Mi-rim	22	1.76 m (5 ft 9 1/2 in)	Jeju Jin
45	조수연 Cho Su-yeon	20	1.75 m (5 ft 9 in)	Gwangju & Jeonnam Sun
46	이아롱 Lee Ah-rong	24	1.72 m (5 ft 7 1/2 in)	Jeju Sun
47	한여란 Han Yeo-ran	22	1.68 m (5 ft 6 in)	Daegu Mi
48	한나영 Han Na-young	25	1.68 m (5 ft 6 in)	Gangwon Mi
49	제민 Je Min	22	1.64 m (5 ft 4 1/2 in)	Incheon Mi
50	김효정 Kim Hyo-jung	22	1.73 m (5 ft 8 in)	Ulsan Jin
51	최지희 Choi Ji-hee	22	1.73 m (5 ft 8 in)	Gyeonggi Jin
52	조윤혜 Cho Yun-hye	24	1.70 m (5 ft 7 in)	Busan Mi
53	박지혜 Park Ji-hye	22	1.75 m (5 ft 9 in)	Gwangju & Jeonnam Jin
54	유수정 Yoo Su-jung	22	1.71 m (5 ft 7 1/2 in)	Los Angeles Mi
55	박지은 Park Ji-eun	24	1.70 m (5 ft 7 in)	New York City Mi
56	김혜림 Kim Hye-rim	25	1.64 m (5 ft 4 1/2 in)	Atlanta Jin
