= Lee Sung-hye =

Lee Sung-hye may refer to:

- Lee Seong-hye (born 1988), South Korean Miss Korea 2011 titleholder
- Lee Sung-hye (taekwondo) (born 1984), South Korean taekwondo practitioner
