= Miss North Macedonia =

Beauty contest

Miss North Macedonia Мис на Северна Македонија
- Formation: 1996
- Purpose: Beauty pageant
- Headquarters: Skopje
- Location: North Macedonia
- Official language: Macedonian
- National director: Eugen Shakir Sela
- Affiliations: Miss Universe; Miss World; Miss Supranational; Miss Grand International; Miss Cosmo

Miss North Macedonia (Macedonian: Мис на Северна Македонија) is a national beauty pageant in North Macedonia where the winners go to Miss Universe, Miss World, Miss Supranational, Miss Grand International and Miss Cosmo pageants. The pageant motto is "Beautifully Confident".

== History ==
Miss North Macedonia or in the past, Miss Macedonia Former Yugoslav Republic of Macedonia (FYRO) was a national beauty pageant that selected representatives for international beauty competitions from the country known today as North Macedonia. The history of the pageant is tied to the broader cultural and political developments of the region, particularly its transition from a part of Yugoslavia to an independent state in 1991.

The pageant began in 1996 after North Macedonia declared independence from Yugoslavia. It served as a platform to promote the country's culture and talent on the international stage.

For years, the pageant operated under the name Miss Macedonia FYRO because the country was internationally recognized as the "Former Yugoslav Republic of Macedonia" (FYROM) until 2019, following the Prespa Agreement, when the name changed officially to North Macedonia.

=== Ownership ===
- Lidija Velkovska (1996―2015)
- Zoran Vasilevski (2015-2024)
- Eugen Shakir Sela (2025-)

== Titleholders ==
Year	Miss North Macedonia
1996	Vera Mesterovic
2001	Sandra Spasovska
2002	Jasna Spasovska
2003	Marija Vasik
2004	Sara Lesi
2005	Milena Stanivukovikj
2006	Marija Vegova
2007	Jana Stojanovska
2009	Suzana Al-Salkini
2010	Stefani Borsova
2011	Vesna Jakimovska
2012	Aneta Stojkoska
2013	Kristina Spasenoska
2014	Martina Dimoska
2015	Emilija Rozman
2016	
2024	Tea Gjorgievska
2025	Iman Totic

== Macedonian at international pageants under Miss North Macedonia org. ==
=== Miss Universe North Macedonia ===
- : Declared the winner
- : Finished as a runner-up or top 5/6 qualification
- : Finished as one of the finalists or semifinalists
- : Finished as aspecial awards winner

Year	Municipality	Region	Miss North Macedonia	Placement at Miss Universe	Special awards
Eugen Shakir Sela directorship — a franchise holder to Miss Universe from 2025
2026	Greater Skopje	Skopje	Katia Doneva	Did not compete	
2025	Greater Skopje	Skopje	Iman Totic	Did not compete	
Zoran Vasilevski directorship — a franchise holder to Miss Universe in 2024
2024	Kumanovo	Northeastern	Tea Gjorgievska	Unplaced	

=== Miss World North Macedonia ===
- : Declared as Winner
- : Ended as runner-up or top 5/6 qualification
- : Ended as one of the finalists or semifinalists
- : Ended as special awards winner

Year	Municipality	Region	Miss North Macedonia	Placement at Miss World	Special awards
Eugen Shakir Sela directorship — a franchise holder to Miss World from 2025
2026	Greater Skopje	Skopje	Eva Velichkovska	Unplaced	
2025	Greater Skopje	Skopje	Charna Nevzati	Unplaced	
Lidija Velkovska directorship — a franchise holder to Miss World between 1996―2015
Did not compete between 2016―2024
2015	Greater Skopje	Skopje	Emilija Rozman	Unplaced	
2014	Greater Skopje	Skopje	Martina Dimoska	Did not compete	
2013	Kičevo	Southwestern	Kristina Spasenoska	Unplaced	
2012	Gostivar	Polog	Aneta Stojkoska	Unplaced	
2011	Struga	Northeastern	Vesna Jakimovska	Unplaced	
2010	Greater Skopje	Skopje	Stefani Borsova	Unplaced	Miss World Talent (Top 21)
2009	Greater Skopje	Skopje	Suzana Al-Salkini	Unplaced	
2008	Did not compete				
2007	Greater Skopje	Skopje	Jana Stojanovska	Unplaced	Miss World Talent (Top 18)
2006	Gevgelija	Southeastern	Marija Vegova	Unplaced	
2005	Greater Skopje	Skopje	Milena Stanivukovikj	Unplaced	
2004	Greater Skopje	Skopje	Sara Lesi	Unplaced	
2003	Greater Skopje	Skopje	Marija Vasik	Unplaced	Miss World Talent (Top 21)
2002	Greater Skopje	Skopje	Jasna Spasovska	Unplaced	
2001	Greater Skopje	Skopje	Sandra Spasovska	Unplaced	
Did not compete between 1997—2000
1996	Greater Skopje	Skopje	Vera Mesterovic	Unplaced	

=== Miss Supranational North Macedonia ===
- : Declared as Winner
- : Ended as runner-up or top 5/6 qualification
- : Ended as one of the finalists or semifinalists
- : Ended as special awards winner

Year	Municipality	Region	Miss North Macedonia	Placement at Miss Supranational	Special awards
Miss North Macedonia directorship — a franchise holder to Miss Supranational from 2025
2026	TBA	TBA	TBA	TBA	
Did not compete between 2013—2025
Another agency in North Macedonia directorship — a franchise holder to Miss Supranational between 2010―2012
2012	Greater Skopje	Skopje	Milena Padovska	Unplaced	
2011	Greater Skopje	Skopje	Kristina Kochova	Unplaced	
2010	Greater Skopje	Skopje	Matea Ristovska	Unplaced	

=== Miss Grand North Macedonia ===
- : Declared as Winner
- : Ended as runner-up or top 5/6 qualification
- : Ended as one of the finalists or semifinalists
- : Ended as special awards winner

Year	Municipality	Region	Miss North Macedonia	Placement at Miss Grand International	Special awards
Miss North Macedonia directorship — a franchise holder to Miss Grand International from 2025
2025	Kumanovo	Northeastern	Ilirjana Saliu	Unplaced	
Did not compete between 2013—2024
Dunavka Trifunovska directorship — a franchise holder to Miss Grand International in 2015
2015	Greater Skopje	Skopje	Dunavka Trifunovska	Unplaced	
2014	Did not compete				
Miki Crnokrak directorship — a franchise holder to Miss Grand International in 2013
2013	Greater Skopje	Skopje	Sandra Stefanovska	Top 20	

=== Miss Cosmo North Macedonia ===
- : Declared as Winner
- : Ended as runner-up or top 5/6 qualification
- : Ended as one of the finalists or semifinalists
- : Ended as special awards winner

Year	Municipality	Region	Miss North Macedonia	Placement at Miss Cosmo	Special awards
Miss North Macedonia directorship — a franchise holder to Miss Cosmo from 2025
2026	TBA	TBA	TBA	TBA	

=== Miss Earth North Macedonia ===
- : Declared as Winner
- : Ended as runner-up or top 5/6 qualification
- : Ended as one of the finalists or semifinalists
- : Ended as special awards winner

Year	Municipality	Region	Miss North Macedonia	Placement at Miss Earth	Special awards
Miss Balkana directorship — a franchise holder to Miss Earth between 2021―2022
Did not compete since 2023
2022	Greater Skopje	Skopje	Anđela Jakimovska	Unplaced	
2021	Gevgelija	Southeastern	Ana Brzanova	Unplaced	
Another agency in North Macedonia directorship — a franchise holder to Miss Earth between 2004―2006
Did not compete between 2007—2020
2006	Greater Skopje	Skopje	Ivana Popovska	Unplaced	
2005	Greater Skopje	Skopje	Jana Stojanovska	Unplaced	
2004	Greater Skopje	Skopje	Natalija Grubovik	Unplaced	

== See also ==
- Miss Universe
