= Lex Rijger =

Surinamese country music singer (1944–2021)

Alexander Lodewijk Antonius Rijger (2 December 1944 – 23 June 2021) was a Surinamese country singer and songwriter. He was known for his television specials for Christmas and Mother's Day. Before becoming a musician, he was a basketball player and referee, founding the local club SCVU.

He wrote one of the SuriPop 2008 finalist songs, "A Song of Life", which was performed by his three daughters. His youngest daughter Zoureena Rijger was Miss Suriname 2009.

== Career ==
Rijger attended the Paulus School in Suriname. He played for the local basketball teams CLD and De Arend. As a leader of the Social Cultural Association Uitvlugt (SCVU in Dutch), Rijger decided to start a basketball team for the area. After studying basketball training in Mexico, he returned and founded the team SCVU with Paul "Pa Lefi" Leeflang in 1964, becoming its vice-president. He also worked as a referee. Although Rijger later shifted his focus to music, he maintained ties with SCVU. Under Rijger's leadership, the SCVU team was promoted to the top league of the Suriname Basketball Federation. In 1969, Rijger took a job with the tax authorities as a bailiff, which he would maintain for 35 years.

Rijger began his career in music in the 1970s: he started a band called 'The Drifter', which played pop, blues and oldies. In the 1980s, his sister Magda Jessurun-Rijger asked him to enter a country music festival with her. They then decided to start a band called "Country Roads", which would host line dance nights. When Magda emigrated to the Netherlands in the 1990s, Rijger continued solo, sometimes collaborating with other country artists like René Nelson. Rijger performed at casinos, hotels (like the Hotel Torarica), and house parties throughout Suriname; he would also organise and perform in television specials for Christmas and Mother's Day. Rijger wrote many of his own songs, including Christmas songs. He also started the Country and Western Music Suriname foundation.

== Family ==
Rijger married Nisa Chandoe in 1984. Rijger and Nisa had five children: two sons and three daughters. One son died in infancy. The remaining four children (son Garry and daughters Cheryll, Xaviera and Zoureena) joined Rijger in his performances when they were older: Garry would be the DJ, and the sisters would sing as a trio. As Rijger also played football in recreational clubs, he did occasional coaching of the youth football teams Puwa Nani and Bintang Baru '82, and would have his children attend the practices.

Garry died in 2004: while walking along a road, he was hit by a taxi whose driver had fallen asleep at the wheel. Rijger was greatly impacted by Garry's death: he took early retirement from his job as a bailiff, and stopped performing for three years. He returned slowly to performing, with Nisa as the DJ. For four months in 2007, the family ran their own club, the "Lex Rijger Countryclub" on Henck Arron Street in Paramaribo; after the club closed, they continued holding line dancing events at different venues. Rijger's original song "A Song of Life", performed by his daughters, was one of the ten final selections for SuriPop in 2008. His youngest daughter Zoureena Rijger was Miss Suriname 2009.

His eldest daughter Cheryll married the actor Ruben Welles in 2019. His daughters continued to perform one or two country songs in their concerts even while they shifted to more house music and pop.

== Illness and death ==
Rijger's last performance was in 2013. He was diagnosed with Alzheimer's disease in 2014, but had been experiencing forgetfulness and other symptoms for several years before.

He died on 23 June 2021 at the age of 76. His funeral was held on 2 July at the Saint Peter and Paul Cathedral, Paramaribo. The newspaper Dagblad Suriname called him "a piece of Texas in Suriname".
