= Miss Grand Singapore =

Beauty pageant title of Singapore

- Formation: September 9, 2023; 3 years ago
- Founder: Adeline Hokulani
- Headquarters: Singapore
- Members: Miss Grand International
- Official language: English
- National director: Angela Tay
- Parent organization: ERM Group (2015–2018, 2026 – present)
- Website: www.ermworld.org

Miss Grand Singapore is an annual beauty pageant in Singapore, that selects a contestant for Miss Grand International. It began in 2013, when the first runner-up of Miss Singapore World 2013, Elizabeth Houghton, was appointed to represent Singapore at Miss Grand International 2013 in Thailand. After that, the license was transferred to different organizers, until an organizer led by Adeline Hokulani, AO Venture Pte Ltd, obtained the franchise in 2023. Since then, Singapore's has never secured any placements at Miss Grand International.

== History ==
Miss Grand Singapore licensee timeline

Singapore first appeared at Miss Grand International 2013, when the franchise was under the Miss World Singapore contest. It appointed the first runner-up of Miss World Singapore 2013, Elizabeth Houghton, to represent the country at the first Miss Grand International in Thailand. Houghton was disqualified by the organization before completing the contest, and their partnership was discontinued. Later in 2014, the franchise was obtained by a real estate development company, Islandia Group Limited.

Under the direction of the Islandia Group, an ad hoc pageant named "Miss Singapore Islandia" was held in 2014 as an entertainment event for the Singapore National Day Charity Gala to promote a new real estate project invested in the Riau Islands of Indonesia, "The Islandia." The event was held at the Golden Mile Complex, in Singapore. The winner of the contest, Jasy ln Tan, was sent to compete at the Miss Grand International 2014 pageant in Thailand.

After the Islandia Group stopped all marketing campaigns for the aforementioned project on 1 December 2014, the license was purchased by the pageant organizer led by Alex Liu, Exclusive Resource Marketing Pte., Ltd. (ERM Singapore Marketing Group), which served as the national licensee for Miss Grand International Singapore from 2015 to 2018. The country representatives during that time were either appointed or determined through the Miss Singapore Beauty Pageant.

After three years of absence, Singapore rejoined the competition in 2022, the franchise was obtained by a medical doctor, Iqmal Muhammad, who is currently serving as the director of Perada International. and was then transferred to Adeline Hokulani of AO Venture Pte Ltd in 2023, when the first contest of Miss Grand Singapore was organized.

== Editions ==
The Miss Grand Singapore pageant has been organized as a stand-alone contest annually since 2023.

Edition	Date	Final Venue	Entrants	Winner	Ref.
1st	9 September 2023	Black Studio, Stamford Arts Centre	15	Jade Wu	
2nd	4 August 2024	Black Studio, Stamford Arts Centre	15	Anisah Rahmat	
3rd (Note: Co-organized with the Manhunt Singapore 2026 pageant.)	25 July 2026	Jyu Lae Bistro, Suntec City	7	Nicole Bacon	

== International competition ==
The following is a list of Singapore representatives at the Miss Grand International contest.

Year	Representative	National qualification	Result		National director	Ref.
Year	Representative	National qualification	Placement	Other awards	National director	Ref.
2013	Elizabeth Houghton	1st runner-up Miss World Singapore 2013	Withdrew during the contest		Edmund Ooi	
2014	Jasy ln Tan	Miss Singapore Islandia 2014	Unplaced	—	The Islandia	
2015	Rouzi Yan	Appointment	Unplaced	—	Alex Liu	
2016	Sabrina Ng	Appointment	Unplaced	—	Alex Liu	
2017	Crystal Lim	Miss Grand Singapore 2017	Did not compete		Alex Liu	
2018	Chang Ruey Jing	Miss Grand Singapore 2018	Did not compete		Alex Liu	
2019 – 2021: No representatives
2022	Emilbiany Intong	2nd runner-up Miss Universe Singapore 2017	Unplaced	—	Iqmal Muhammad	
2023	Jade Wu	Miss Grand Singapore 2023	Unplaced	—	Adeline Hokulani	
2024	Anisah Rahmat	Miss Grand Singapore 2024	Unplaced	—	Adeline Hokulani	
2025	Rose Pang	Appointment	Unplaced	—	Hui Lin	
2026	Nicole Bacon	Miss Grand Singapore 2026	Unplaced		Angela Tay	

== Winners gallery ==
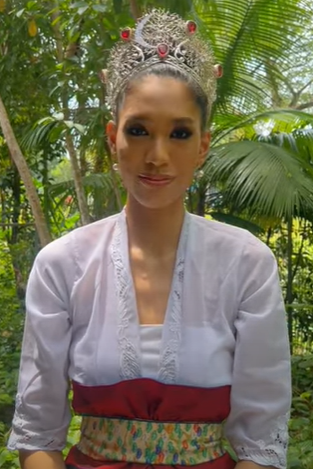
2022, Emilbiany Intong

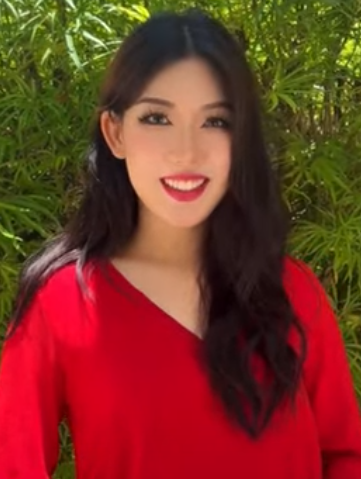
2023, Jade Wu

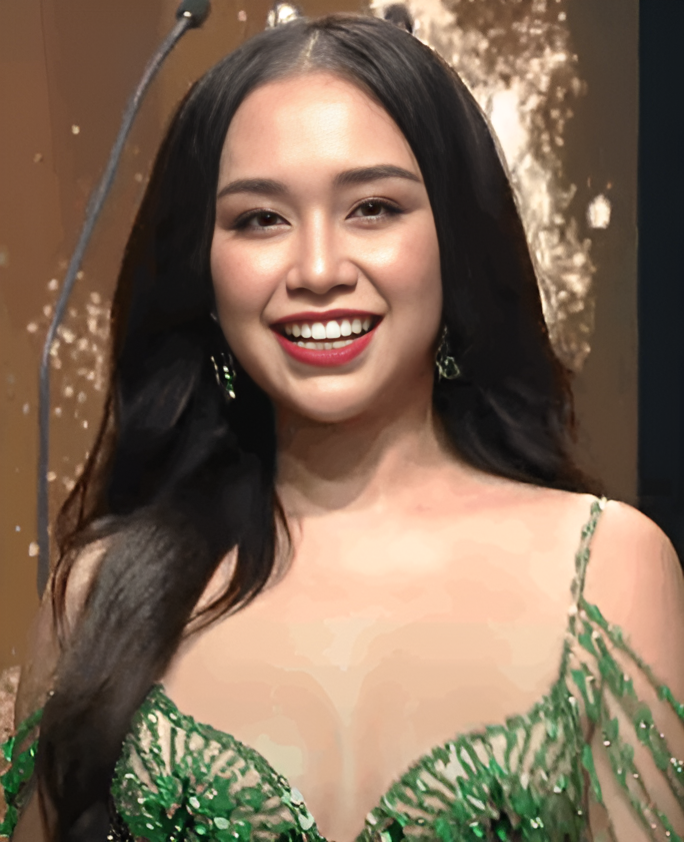
2024, Anisah Rahmat

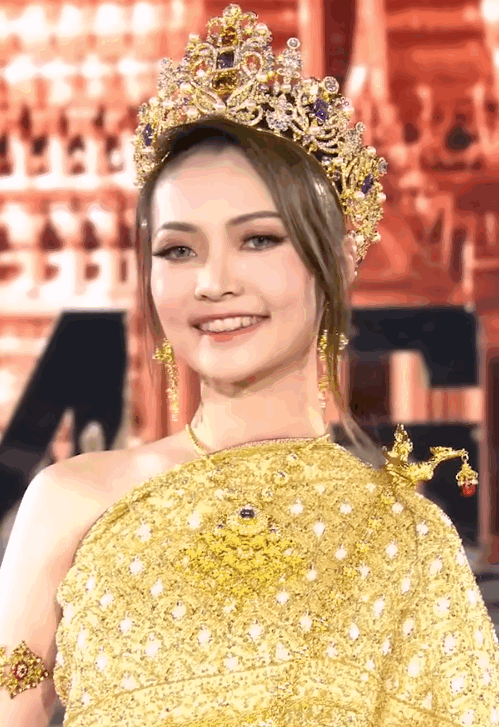
2025, Rose Pang

== Controversy ==
In the inaugural edition of the Miss Grand International pageant held in Thailand in 2013, the Singaporean representative, Elizabeth Houghton, was disqualified from the contest before finishing the pageant tournament. The vice president of the international firms stated that her misbehavior, Houghton violated the hotel's no-smoking rule by smoking in public and did not join most of the pageant activities by claiming to be unwell, causing the organizer to need her to retire from the competition. Houghton, however, confirmed with one of the management staff that guests can smoke on the balconies.

Houghton additionally claimed the reason for such an incident might be that she stood up for other contestants, Miss Germany and Miss Sweden, who were teased by the organizer for being fat, and as a result, she got blacklisted.

In addition to Miss Singapore, the representatives of Denmark, Sweden, and Ukraine also withdrew before entering the grand final round of the aforementioned international pageant.
