= Ris Low =

Singaporean model (born 1990)

- Born: Ris Low Yi Min; 28 May 1990 (age 36); Singapore
- Height: 5 ft 7 in (1.70 m)
- Beauty pageant titleholder
- Title: Miss Singapore World 2009
- Hair color: Black
- Eye color: Brown

Ris Low Yi Min (Chinese: 刘依敏) is a Singaporean beauty pageant titleholder. Low was crowned Miss Singapore World 2009 on 31 July 2009. She stepped down on 29 September 2009 after it emerged that she was involved in a credit card fraud case. She took a diploma in Health Science, Hospitality and a diploma in Nursing at the Management Development Institute of Singapore.

Low was ranked as one of the 25 most influential people or groups in Asia in 2009 by a division of the United States news network CNN. She was appointed as a spokesperson by a condom company, to raise awareness about safe sex.

== Miss Singapore World ==
=== Crowning ===
Low participated in Miss Singapore World 2009 and was crowned Miss Singapore World on 31 July 2009. In addition to winning the crown, she was also named the following: Miss Community Ambassadress 2009, Miss Lumiere Ambassadress 2009, Miss Best Dressed 2009, Miss Dazzling Eyes 2009, Miss Photogenic 2009, Miss Crowning Glory 2009, and Miss Best in Catwalk 2009.

In 2009, a Razor TV video interview with Low went viral online. Low was criticised for her English-language skills. The organiser of the Singapore franchise of the Miss World beauty pageant, ERM World Marketing, defended Low's win. A representative said that Low had performed excellently throughout the competition and won eight special awards. The representative also claimed that the one-off fashion interview had misled the public into believing she spoke English poorly. During the final competition, "[Low] spoke perfectly good English, had a good answer, and performed very well to impress the eleven judges that she was good enough to win."

=== Credit fraud ===
On 25 September 2009, it was revealed that Low had been convicted of credit card fraud in May 2009, and was sentenced to two years' probation. She faced five charges of misappropriation, cheating using illegally obtained credit cards, and impersonating their users' identities prior to winning the title of Miss Singapore World 2009. Low claimed she was unaware of the fact that she needed to declare the offence, and only declared it two months after the pageant when she was required to sign a contract. Legal issues may be involved if Low needs to travel, and she may have her title revoked. ERM World Marketing declined to comment on the issue, although an employee was quoted to have said "Singaporeans did not pay for [Low]" when asked if Low would keep her crown.

=== Stepping down ===
After initially resisting calls to give up her crown, Low voluntarily stepped down on 29 September 2009. She felt that it would be better for everyone and that giving up the crown was the best choice she could make. ERM said it would interview a new representative to represent Singapore at Miss World 2009, and appointed the runner-up Pilar Arlando.

== Career outside of pageant ==
=== Business Venture ===
In December 2009, the 19-year-old began looking for sponsors for brand new three-in-one beauty pageant for Singapore. She had started to send out email messages to potential sponsors, such as malls and event organisers, spelling out details for the proposed event in the middle of 2010. The selling point, she wrote, is that three winners will be crowned at the same event – Miss Singapore, Mr Singapore and Mrs Singapore.

=== Acting ===
In March 2010, it was announced that Low would be joining the co-hosting the Shan and Rozz show. There was some outrage among listeners over the employment of her as DJ due to her poor command and diction of English. On the first day of co-hosting the show, Low arrived late and left early for the show and Rozz stormed off the studio after an argument. On 1 April, It was later revealed that it was an April Fools' Day joke by the show and Burger King in an advertising campaign for Burger King's Angry Whooper.

In 2012, Low starred in a slasher film, Justice Devil, which was released in 2014.

== Personal life ==
=== Bipolar disorder ===
On 26 September 2009, Low revealed to The Straits Times in a phone interview that she has bipolar disorder. In a subsequent interview published by The Sunday Times, she revealed that she got her bipolar disorder officially diagnosed after heeding a suggestion by her lawyer to get a medical check up in the hopes of distancing herself from her wrongdoings. She said it requires medication and psychiatric visits. She revealed that she has had the urge to steal since young and stole Pokémon cards once in Primary One. The act provided her with a sense of achievement: "that you've done something and you got away with it." Her mother detected the problem when she noticed the growing collection of toys and taught her to count to ten and walk away when faced with the urge.

=== Molestation incident ===
On 17 March 2010, Low claimed that a stranger pulled down her tube top and groped her breast. Although she has since filed a police report, the incident was met with scepticism by netizens, and many believed it was a publicity stunt.
