= Gallagher Convention Centre =

Convention centre in South Africa

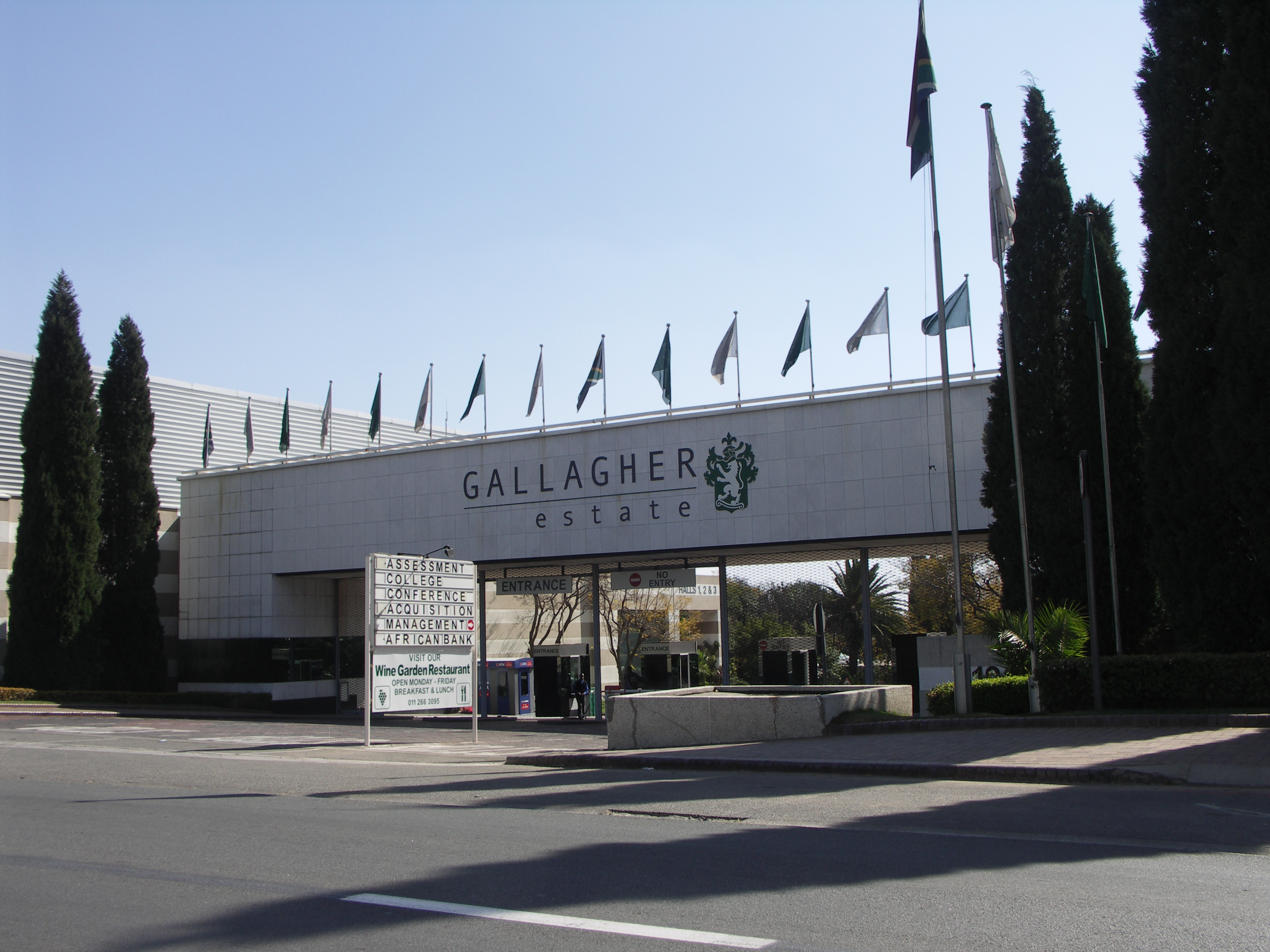
- Gallagher Convention Centre
- Interactive map of Gallagher Convention Centre
- Former names: Gallagher Estates
- Address: 19 Richards Drive, Midrand, Gauteng
- Location: South Africa
- Coordinates: 26°00′06″S 28°07′48″E
- Owner: Hosken Consolidated Investments

Construction
- Opened: 1995

Website
- gallagher.co.za

The Gallagher Convention Centre is a convention centre in Midrand, South Africa and is the seat of the Pan-African Parliament. (Note: Dlamini, Ndaba (20 September 2004). "Pan African Parliament opens at Gallagher Estate". eProperty News.) It is a wholly owned subsidiary of Cape Town-based investment holding company Hosken Consolidated Investments.

Marking its first time, Gallagher Convention Centre was the host venue for the Miss World 2009 Grand Coronation Night.

Preceded by: Sandton Convention Centre; Johannesburg, South Africa	Miss World Venue; 2009	Succeeded by: Crown of Beauty Theatre; Sanya, China PR
