= Jung So-ra =

Korean beauty pageant titleholder (born 1991)

Jung So-ra 정소라
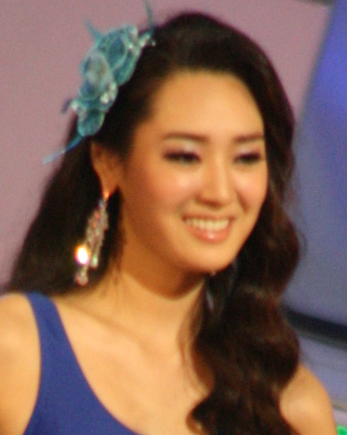
- Born: Jung So-ra; March 10, 1991 (age 35); California, United States
- Height: 1.71 m (5 ft 7 1/2 in)
- Beauty pageant titleholder
- Title: Miss Korea 2010
- Hair color: Black
- Eye color: Brown
- Major competitions: Miss Korea 2010 (Winner); Miss Universe 2011

Jung So-ra (Korean: 정소라; born March 10, 1991), also known as Sora Jung in the Western media, is a South Korean model and beauty pageant titleholder who was crowned Miss Korea 2010 and represented her country in the 2011 Miss Universe pageant.

== Early life ==
Jung is the daughter of the chairman of the Korean Chamber of Commerce in Shanghai and intends to become a diplomat. She graduated from Shanghai American School in the class of 2009. She had previous attended University of California, Riverside, but now she is currently attending Korea University. She speaks two languages: Korean and English.

== Miss Korea 2010 ==
Jung, who stands 1.71 m (5 ft 7 1/2 in) tall, competed as one of 56 finalists in her country's national beauty pageant, Miss Korea, held on July 25, 2010 in Seoul, where she became the eventual winner of the title, gaining the right to represent South Korea in Miss Universe 2011.

After the pageant, Jung donated all her prize money to the International Vaccine Institute, an organization that develops and distributes vaccines in developing countries. "I made this decision to keep my promise to serve society when I was crowned Miss Korea," she said.

== Miss Universe 2011 ==
As the official representative of her country to the 2011 Miss Universe pageant, broadcast live from São Paulo, Brazil on September 12, 2011, Jung vied to succeed the then Miss Universe titleholder, Ximena Navarrete of Mexico, she was however unplaced in the title holders.

Awards and achievements
Preceded by Kim Joo-ri	Miss Korea; 2010	Succeeded by Lee Seong-hye
