= Pilar Arlando =

Singaporean model

- Born: Pilar Carmelita Anastasia Arlando; 1 September 1989 (age 36); Singapore
- Occupation: model
- Years active: 2009–present
- Known for: Miss Singapore World 2009-2010
- Height: 5'8 (1.73cm)

Pilar Carmelita Anastasia Arlando (born 1 September 1989 in Porto, Portugal) is a Singaporean model and beauty pageant titleholder who won the title of Miss Singapore World 2009.

== Biography ==
Arlando was raised in Singapore.

During the Miss Singapore World pageant, Arlando earned the 2nd Runner Up 2009/10 title, but took over from Ris Low, who had to resign the title.

Arlando went on to represent Singapore at the Miss World 2009 Pageant, held in Johannesburg, South Africa on 12 December 2009. She represented her nation as one of the top 12 for the Sports Fast Track Event.

Arlando has been part of various charity events, and is particularly active for children with Down syndrome.
