= Zoureena Rijger =

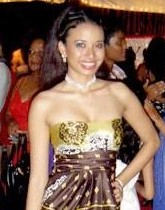
- Zoureena Rijger, Miss Suriname 2009
- Born: June 19, 1991 (age 35); Paramaribo, Suriname
- Height: 1.71 m (5 ft 7 in)
- Beauty pageant titleholder
- Title: Miss Suriname 2009
- Hair color: Black
- Eye color: Brown
- Major competitions: Miss Suriname, Miss World

Zoureena Saviera Nazrul Rijger (born in Paramaribo, Suriname, on June 19, 1991) is a Surinamese singer and beauty pageant titleholder who won Miss Suriname 2009.

== Biography ==
Zoureena is the daughter of well-known Surinamese country singer Lex Rijger and his wife Nisa Rijger. Lex performed with his daughters Cheryll, Zoureena, and Xaviera in a group called Lex Rijger and Family. The girls also sing on their own as the group The Rijger Sisters. At the Surinamese song festival Suripop 2008, they performed the song A Song of Life, written by their father.

On August 28, 2009, Rijger was crowned Miss Suriname 2009 at the Marriott Hotel Suriname. On November 10, 2009, Rijger travelled to South Africa to take part in the Miss World 2009 beauty pageant, which took place on December 12, 2009.
