= Miss Singapore World =

Beauty pageant

MISS WORLD SINGAPORE
- Formation: 1972
- Type: Beauty pageant
- Headquarters: Singapore
- Location: Singapore
- Members: Miss World
- Official language: English
- National Director: Sean Wong, PBM
- Website: Official page

Miss World Singapore is a Singapore beauty pageant and the only national pageant in Singapore televised on Mediacorp Channel 5.

== Titleholders ==
Year	Miss World Singapore	Runners Up			
Year	Miss World Singapore	First	Second	Third	Fourth
2009	Ris Low	Claire Lee	Pilar Arlando	Marylin Wen Kah Lung	Cellia Ruo
2010	Anusha Rajaseharan	Jacelyn Lin	Keong Hui Shan	Krizzia Shannen Ann Cabarrubias Sayson	Ye Jiahui
2011	May Hsu	Benazir Beevi	Suzanne Chu	Wen Xu Tian	Nandini Karashtivili
2012	Karisa Sukamto	Michelle Koh	Sarah Noble	Magdalenna Yu	Genoveva Lim Ji Han
2013	Maria-Anna Weiling Zenieris	Elizabeth Houghton	Rachel Leng	Adella Loh	Dalmana Balakrishnan
2014	Dalreena Poonam Gill	Kimberly Lam	Louissa Lavnea Thomas	Angeline Yap	Poon Wing Yan
2015	Charity Lu	Kuek Ziyi	Charis Lin	Ashley Chin	Sheen Cher
2016	Bhaama Padmanathan	Si Yi Han	Feronica Zefanya Haartog	Layla Jee Wei Ping	Poojana Harresh
2017	Laanya Ezra Asogan	Niroshini Nixit	Shree Vijayandran	Chan Qianyi	Hannah Sofea
2018	Vanessa Peh Ting Ting	Shonalie Raha	Vanessa Tiara Tay	Sophie Florence Lin	Marlene Ramos Larsone
2019	Sheen Cher	Rafillah Rapit	Janna Tan	Trishala Nar Singh	Kareena Kaur
2020	Due to the impact of COVID-19 pandemic, no pageant in 2020				
2021	Khai Ling Ho	Tania Tan Yi Rong	Niveda Jayashankar		

== Singapore's representative at Miss World ==
The winner of Miss World Singapore represents her country at Miss World. On occasion, when the winner does not qualify (due to age) for either contest, a runner-up is sent.

Year	Miss World Singapore	Placement at Miss World	Special Awards
1972	Rosalind Lee Eng Neo	Unplaced	
1973	Debra Josephine de Souza	Unplaced	
1974	Valerie Oh Choon Lian	Unplaced	
1975	Maggie Sim Siew Teen	Unplaced	
1976	Pauline Poh Neo Cheong	Top 15	
1978	Rosie Tan	Unplaced	
1979	Violet Lee	Unplaced	
1980	Adda Pang Kim Jong	Unplaced	
1981	Sushil Kaur Sandhu	Unplaced	
1982	Yvonne Tan Yen Yen	Unplaced	
1983	Sharon Denise Wells	Unplaced	
1984	Koh Li Peng	Unplaced	
1985	Joanne Sylvia	Unplaced	
1986	Michelle Loh Yeh Huey	Unplaced	
1987	Janicia Koh Wee Ling	Unplaced	
1988	Shirley Teo Ser Lee	Unplaced	
1989	Jacqueline Ang	Unplaced	
1990	Karen Frances Ng	Unplaced	
1991	Jasheen Jayakody	Unplaced	
1992	Jennifer Wong	Unplaced	
1993	Desiree Chan Fonn Yin	Unplaced	
1994	Angela Lee Kim Mei	Unplaced	
1995	Jacqueline Chew	Unplaced	
1996	Carol Tan	Unplaced	
1997	Jasmine Wong Chiew Peng	Unplaced	
1998	Grace Chay	Unplaced	
1999	Audrey Quek Ai Woon	Unplaced	
2000	Charlyn Ding Zung Ee	Unplaced	
2001	Angelina Johnson	Unplaced	
2002	Sharon Cintamani	Unplaced	
2003	Corine Kanmani Luxshman	Unplaced	
2004	Lisa Huang Shu Jun	Unplaced	
2005	Shenise Wong Yan Yi	Unplaced	
2006	Colleen Francisca Pereira	Unplaced	4th Runner Up — Miss World Beach Beauty
2007	Roshni Kaur Soin	Unplaced	
2008	Faraliza Tan	Unplaced	
2009	Pilar Carmelita Arlando	Unplaced	
2010	Anusha Rajaseharan	Unplaced	
2011	May Hsu	Unplaced	
2012	Karisa Sukamto	Unplaced	
2013	Maria-Anna Weiling Zenieris	Unplaced	
2014	Dalreena Poonam Gill	Unplaced	
2015	Charity Lu	Unplaced	
2016	Bhaama Padmanathan	Unplaced	Top 27 — Sports
2017	Laanya Ezra Asogan	Unplaced	Top 18 — Sports
2018	Vanessa Peh Ting Ting	Top 30	Winner — Head to Head Challenge (Round 1 and 2); Top 25 — Beauty with a Purpose; Top 30 — Swimsuit Music Video
2019	Sheen Cher	Unplaced	
2020	Due to the impact of COVID-19 pandemic, no pageant in 2020		
2021	Khai Ling Ho	Unplaced	Top 27 — Miss World Talent
2022	Miss World 2021 was rescheduled to 16 March 2022 due to the COVID-19 pandemic outbreak in Puerto Rico, no edition started in 2022		
2023	Oh Wei Qi	Unplaced	
2024	No competition held		
2025	Katerina Delvina	Unplaced	
2026	Aishwarya Tan	Unplaced	

== See also ==
- Miss Singapore Universe
- Miss Singapore International
- Miss Earth Singapore
- Miss Grand Singapore
