= Suzana Al-Salkini =

Macedonian beauty pageant titleholder (born 1984)

- Сузана Ал-Салкини
- Born: Suzana Al-Salkini; 1984 (age 41–42); Skopje, SR Macedonia, SFR Yugoslavia
- Height: 1.76 m (5 ft 9 in)
- Beauty pageant titleholder
- Hair color: Light brown
- Eye color: Green/Grey
- Major competition: Miss World 2009

Suzana Al-Salkini (Macedonian: Сузана Ал-Салкини; born 1984) is a Macedonian model and beauty pageant titleholder who was crowned Miss Macedonia 2009 and right to represent her country in Miss World 2008 in Johannesburg, South Africa, on 13 December 2008, but due to financial issues and the lack of sponsorship, she was not allowed to travel to South Africa to compete for the crown. Instead, she was given the opportunity to compete in Miss World 2009, also in Johannesburg, South Africa on 12 December 2009.
