= Squad 38 =

2016 South Korean television series

- Promotional poster
- Also known as: Tax Team 38
- Hangul: 38사기동대
- Lit.: Fraud Task Force 38
- RR: 38sagidongdae
- MR: 38sagidongdae
- Genre: Revenge Crime
- Based on: Character from InfinityOne Comics Entertainment Inc.
- Written by: Han Jeong-hoon
- Directed by: Han Dong-hwa
- Starring: Ma Dong-seok; Seo In-guk; Choi Soo-young
- Composer: Kim Tae-seong
- Country of origin: South Korea
- Original language: Korean
- No. of episodes: 16

Production
- Executive producers: Park Ho-sik; Jinnie Choi; Jung Chang-hwan; Han Se-min
- Producer: Hwang Joon-hyuk
- Running time: 65 minutes
- Production companies: Studio Dragon; SM C&C; InfinityOne Comics Entertainment Inc.; CJ E&M

Original release
- Network: OCN
- Release: June 17 – August 6, 2016

Squad 38 (Korean: 38사기동대) is a South Korean television series starring Ma Dong-seok, Seo In-guk and Choi Soo-young. It aired on cable network OCN on Fridays and Saturdays at 23:00 (KST) for 16 episodes from June 17, 2016 to August 6, 2016.

== Synopsis ==
The story is about civil servant Baek Sung-il and his team who collect taxes from habitual tax evaders as well as delinquent taxpayers in cooperation with the fraudster Yang Jeong-do.

== Origin of title ==
Squad 38 is motivated and received advice from "38 Tax Collection Division" (aka 38기동대: Task force 38) in Seoul Metropolitan Government.

The number 38 is derived from Article 38 of Constitution of South Korea, which stipulates the duty to pay taxes:

모든 국민은 법률이 정하는 바에 의하여 납세의 의무를 진다.
All citizens shall have the duty to pay taxes under the conditions as prescribed by Act.

The Korean title "사기동대 (sagidongdae)" is the combination of the words 사기 (sagi: fraud) and 기동대 (gidongdae: task force). In the logo of this series, letter of 사기 is written in blue and underlined to emphasize.

The motto of the drama, "끝까지 사기쳐서 반드시 징수한다" (Swindle to the end, must be collected.) is parody of, the motto of 38 Tax Collection Division, "끝까지 추적하여 반드시 징수한다" (Trace to the end, must be collected.)

== Cast ==
=== Main cast ===
- Ma Dong-seok as Baek Sung-il/Park Woong-cheol – manager of Tax Collection Bureau's section 3
- Seo In-guk as Yang Jeong-do – professional swindler
- Choi Soo-young as Cheon Sung-hee – Tax Collection Bureau's officer

=== Supporting cast ===
==== 38 Revenue Collection Unit ====
- Song Ok-sook as Noh Bang-shil – nickname "Wallet"
- Heo Jae-ho as Jang Hak-joo – nickname "Cannon"
- Ko Kyu-pil as Jung Ja-wang – nickname "Keyboard"
- Lee Sun-bin as Jo Mi-joo – nickname "Kkotbaem" = flower-snake (literally) = seductive girl (meaning)
- Kim Joo-ri as Choi Ji-yeon

==== Seowon Town Hall ====
- Ahn Nae-sang as Cheon Gap-soo – mayor of Seowon
- Jo Woo-jin as Ahn Tae-wook – director of Tax Collection Bureau
- Kim Byung-choon as Kang Noh-seung – manager of Tax Collection Bureau's section 1
- Lee Hak-joo as Ahn Chang-ho – young employee of Tax Collection Bureau
- Kim Joo-hun as Investigator Park – investigator of Tax Collection Bureau's section 3
- Jung Do-won as Investigator Kim – investigator of Tax Collection Bureau's section 3

==== Extended cast ====
- Jung In-gi as Sa Jae-sung – detective
- Lee Ho-jae as Choi Cheol-woo – former representative of Woohyang Group
- Kim Hong-pa as Bang Pil-gyu – Choi Cheol-woo's second in-command
- Oh Dae-hwan as Ma Jin-seok
- Lee Deok-hwa as Chairman Wang

==== Others ====
- Song Young-gyu as Taxation officer
- Oh Yoo-jin as Baek Ah-jeong – Baek Sung-il's daughter
- Jo Seon-joo as Baek Sung-il's wife
- Jang Myung-gap as Kim Gyu-sik
- Lee Seung-hyung as Cheon Gap-soo's secretary
- Jo Jae-ryong as Section chief Shim Yong-jae
- Im Hyun-sung as Bang Ho-seok
- Ji Sung-geun
- Kim Eung-soo as Jo Sang-jin
- Nam Moon-cheol as Yang Jae-taek
- Kwon Tae-won as Noh Deok-gi
- Jo Yeon-hee as Baek Sung-il's wife
- Kang Min-tae as Jang Hak-joo band's member
- Geum Gwang-san as Jang Hak-joo band's member
- Park Dae-gyu
- Kim Joo-hwang
- Lee Seon-goo
- Kang Cheol-sung
- Kwon Ban-seok
- Han Ho-yong
- Lee Gyu-tae
- Hwang Tae-ho
- Gong Min-gyu
- Hwang Sang-kyung
- Kim Ji-sung as Bang Mi-na
- Jung Dong-gyu as Police chief Jin Seon-hwan
- Lee Cho-ah
- Kim Bo-bae
- Park Byung-wook
- Kim Ki-nam
- Baek Seung-cheol
- Im Jong-yoon
- Lee Dong-jin
- Jung Ae-hwa
- Seo Min-kyung
- Ha Soo-yeon
- Joo Young-ho
- Lee Sang-hong
- Kim Hae-gon
- Yoon Man-dal as Park Sang-ho
- Hong Dae-sung
- Moon Hak-jin
- Kim Jong-doo
- Kim Sung-il
- Jo Gi-tae
- Park Do-joon
- Jung Jae-sung
- Lee Shi-yoo as Choi Mi-sook

=== Cameo appearances ===
- Oh Man-seok as Park Deok-bae
- Jo Deok-hyun as Cha Myung-soo
- Lee Se-young (Ep. 3)
- Park Sung-woong (Ep. 2)
- Kim Sung-oh (Ep. 2)

== Production ==
The series' main cast lineup was unveiled on March 3, 2016.

The first script reading was held on March 19, 2016 at the CJ E&M Centre in Sangam-dong, Seoul, South Korea.

== Ratings ==
Average TV viewership ratings
Ep.	Original broadcast date	Average audience share		
Ep.	Original broadcast date	Nielsen Korea		TNmS
Ep.	Original broadcast date	Nationwide	Seoul	Nationwide
1	June 17, 2016	1.577%	2.147%	1.0%
2	June 18, 2016	1.920%	1.524%	1.4%
3	June 24, 2016	2.251%	2.454%	1.9%
4	June 25, 2016	3.338%	3.193%	2.9%
5	July 1, 2016	1.867%	1.738%	1.9%
6	July 2, 2016	3.088%	3.008%	3.2%
7	July 8, 2016	3.185%	3.185%	2.9%
8	July 9, 2016	4.063%	4.027%	3.3%
9	July 15, 2016	3.383%	2.818%	3.3%
10	July 16, 2016	3.955%	3.783%	3.9%
11	July 22, 2016	3.578%	3.409%	3.4%
12	July 23, 2016	4.468%	4.903%	4.4%
13	July 29, 2016	3.794%	3.488%	3.8%
14	July 30, 2016	4.386%	4.122%	4.8%
15	August 5, 2016	4.099%	4.134%	5.0%
16	August 6, 2016	4.559%	4.024%	6.7%
Average		3.344%	3.247%	3.363%
Special	August 12, 2016	N/A		
In the table above, the blue numbers represent the lowest ratings and the red numbers represent the highest ratings.; This series aired on a cable channel/pay TV which normally has a relatively smaller audience compared to free-to-air TV/public broadcasters (KBS, SBS, MBC and EBS).

== Original soundtracks ==
=== OST Part 1 ===
No.	Title	Artist	Length
1.	"Run (뛰어)"	Sunyoul, Jinhoo, Bit-to	2:39
2.	"Run (뛰어)" (Inst.)		2:39
Total length:			5:18

=== OST Part 2 ===
No.	Title	Artist	Length
1.	"Cool"	Key, Doyoung	3:25
2.	"Cool" (Inst.)		3:25
Total length:			6:50

== International broadcast ==
The broadcasting rights to the series were sold to 11 countries, China, Cambodia, Japan, Hong Kong, Taiwan, Malaysia, Singapore, Indonesia, the Philippines, Australia and New Zealand.

== Awards and nominations ==
Year	Award	Category	Recipient	Result	Ref.
2016	5th APAN Star Awards	Best Supporting Actor	Ma Dong-seok	Nominated	
2016	11th Asian TV Drama Conference	Special Award, Actor	Seo In-guk	Won	
2016	11th Asian TV Drama Conference	Special Award, Director	Han Dong-hwa	Won	
2017	11th Cable TV Broadcasting Awards	Cable Star Award – Style Icon	Kim Joo-ri	Won	
