= Miss Grand Singapore 2024 =

2nd Miss Grand Singapore competition, beauty pageant edition

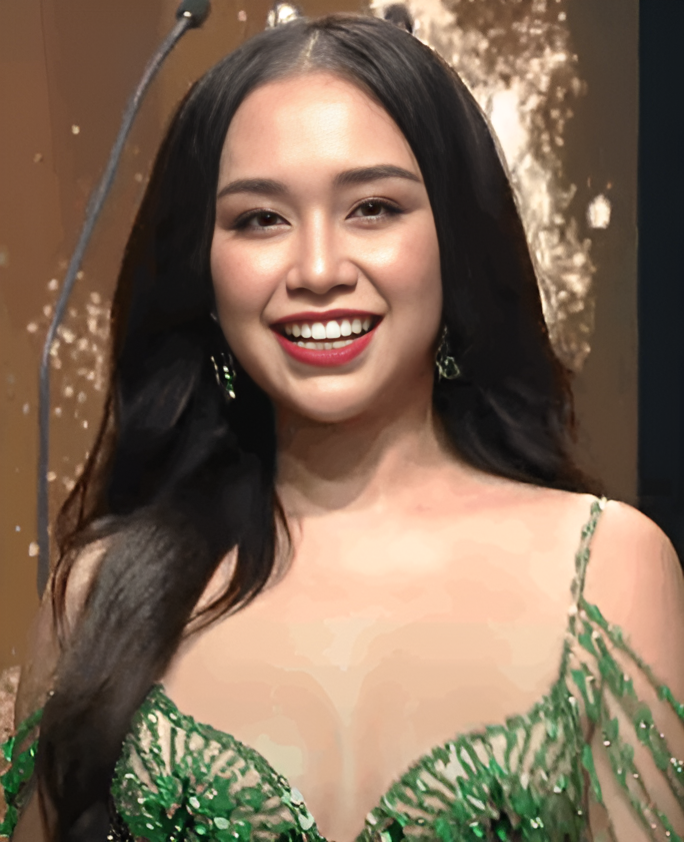
- Anisah Rahmat, the winner of the contest
- Date: 4 August 2024
- Venue: Black Studio, Stamford Arts Centre, Singapore
- Entrants: 15
- Placements: 10
- Winner: Anisah Rahmat

Miss Grand Singapore 2024 was the second edition of the Miss Grand Singapore pageant, held on 4 August 2024, at the Black Studio, Stamford Arts Centre Singapore. Fifteen candidates who qualified for the national finals through the virtual screening competed for the title. Of whom, a 22-year-old assistant manager, Anisah Rahmat, was named the winner. Anisah will represent Singapore at the international parent stage of Miss Grand International 2024, to be held in Thailand on 25 October 2024.

== Competition ==
After the screening of the profile submitted online by the applicants, 16 finalists were qualified for pre-pageant activities arranged from April to August 2024. The scheme included several challenging activities, catwalk training, and other pageant-related programs. The pre-pageant score determined the semi-finalists in the grand final round.

== Candidates ==
The national finalists for the pageant edition include:

1. Sindhu “”(5th Runner Up)”
2. Lida ”(3rd Runner Up)”
3. Andrea
4. Dhivvya
5. Gerlyn “(4th Runner Up)”
6. Anisah Rahmat (Winner)
7. Ashley
8. Miya
9. Maylani “(1st Runner Up)”
10. Natasha
11. Cara
12. Aiko “(2nd Runner Up)”
13. Krystal
14. Shivaani
15. Raudah
16. Joan
