= Miss Grand Singapore 2023 =

1st Miss Grand Singapore competition, beauty pageant edition

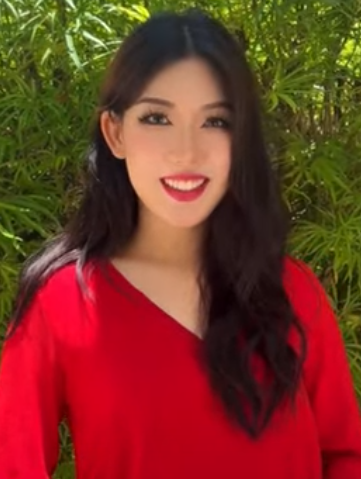
- Jiahui Jade Wu, the winner of the contest
- Date: 9 September 2023
- Venue: Black Studio, Stamford Arts Centre, Singapore
- Entrants: 15
- Placements: 6
- Winner: Jiahui Jade Wu

Miss Grand Singapore 2023 was the first edition of the Miss Grand Singapore pageant, held on 9 September 2023, at the Black Studio in the Stamford Arts Centre. Fifteen candidates competed for the title, and a 24-year-old Nanyang Technological University graduate, Jiahui Jade Wu, was announced the winner. Jade Wu later represented Singapore at the parent international stage, Miss Grand International 2023, in Vietnam in October 2023.

The pageant was managed by an event organizer, AO Ventures Pte., Ltd., chaired by former Miss Singapore, Adeline Hokulani.

== List of finalists ==
The national finalists for the pageant edition include:

1. Yuva Zakan
2. Teanne Low
3. Sakthi Mekana
4. Angel Abergas
5. Claira Su
6. Rebecca Gloria
7. Nadine Adriana
8. Jade Wu (Winner)
9. Janika van Soestbergen
10. Ashley Gan
11. Gayatri Ravi
12. Nurfasihah Abdullah
13. Aiko Saker
14. Tan Sheya
15. Madeleine Poh
