= Kim Joo-ri =

South Korean model and actress (born 1988)

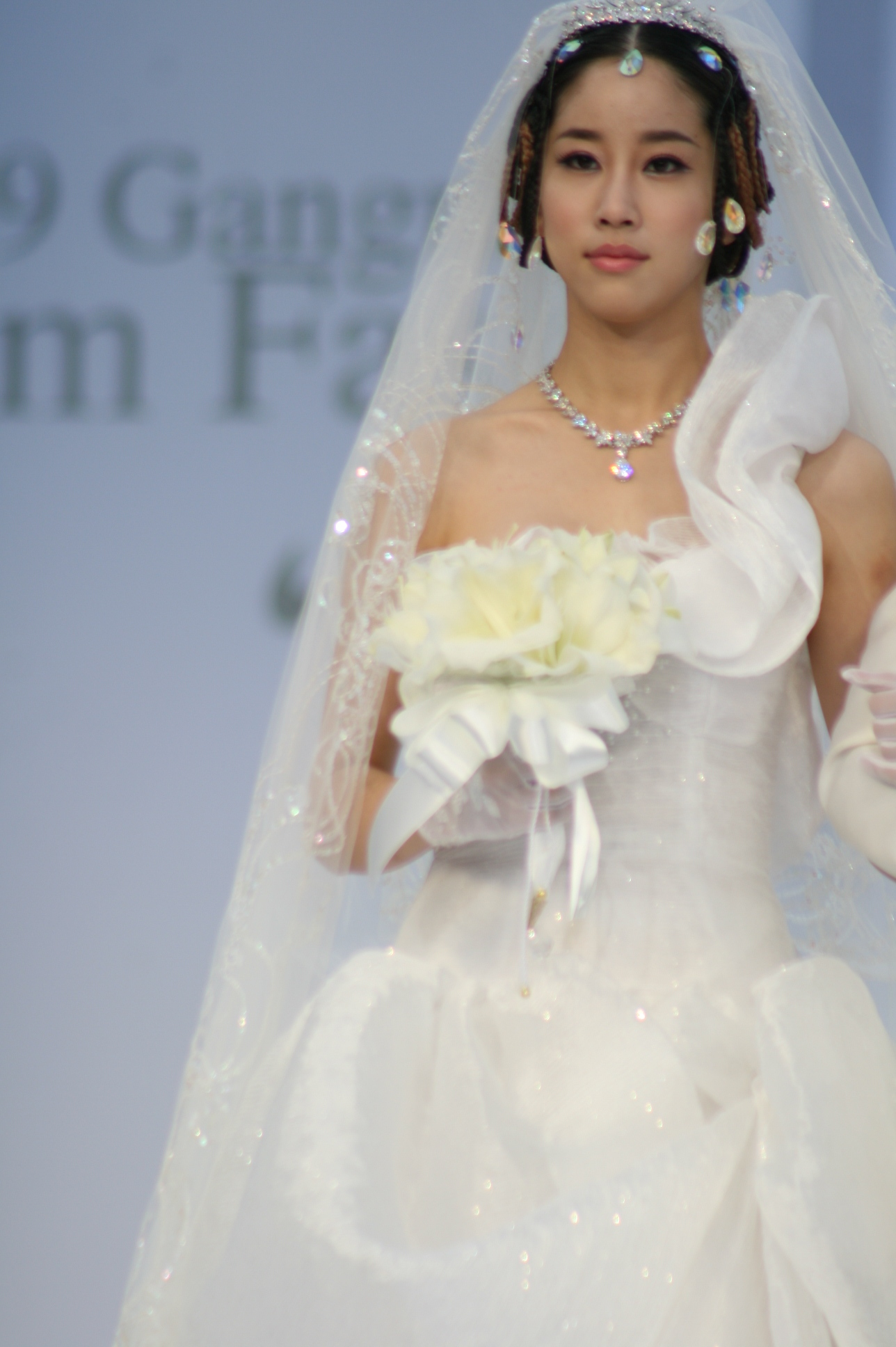
- Kim in 2009
- Born: 21 May 1988 (age 38); Seoul, South Korea
- Height: 1.72 m (5 ft 7 1/2 in)
- Beauty pageant titleholder
- Title: Miss Seoul 2009; Miss Korea 2009
- Agency: PF Entertainment
- Hair color: Black
- Eye color: Black
- Major competitions: Miss World 2009 (Top 16); Miss Universe 2010 (Unplaced)

Korean name
- Hangul: 김주리
- RR: Gim Juri
- MR: Kim Churi

Kim Joo-ri (Korean: 김주리, born May 21, 1988) is a South Korean actress, model and beauty pageant titleholder who was the winner of Miss Korea 2009, and actress. For the first time ever, the Miss Korea winner represented Korea in Miss World 2009, and competed in Miss Universe 2010. She was also crowned as Miss Seoul 2009 before competing in Miss Korea 2009.

== Pageantry ==
=== Miss World 2009 ===
Kim Joo-ri placed among the top 20 finalists of Miss World Beach Beauty competition which took place at Zimbali Resort, Kwazulu-Natal, Durban, South Africa on 25 November 2009 and won first runner up in the Miss World Talent competition. At Miss World 2009, she placed in the final Top 16, and won Beauty Queen of Asia & Oceania. Korea's last placement was Oh Eun-young in 2005. She later placed in the top 100 at Miss Grand Slam and finished in 56th place due to her semifinal position in Miss World. In 2010, she was guest judge in the final Mister World 2010 beauty pageant in Incheon, South Korea.

=== Miss Universe 2010 ===
Kim Joo-ri represented South Korea in the Miss Universe 2010 pageant held on 23 August 2010, held in Las Vegas, Nevada, United States where she was unplaced.

== Filmography ==
=== Television series ===
Year	Title	Role	Network
2011–2012	If Tomorrow Comes	Lee Ji-mi	SBS
2016	Squad 38	Choi Ji-yeon	OCN
2016	I'm Sorry, But I Love You	Shin Hee-ju	SBS
2019	A Place in the Sun	Hong Ji-eun	KBS2

=== Films ===
Year	Title	Role
2015	Mission: Kidnap the Top Star	Jung Su-jin

== See also ==
- Moscow State Academy of Choreography
- Royal Ballet School

Awards and achievements
Preceded by (India) Parvathy Omanakuttan	Miss World Asia & Oceania; 2009	Succeeded by (China) Xiao Tang
Preceded by Na Ree	Miss Korea; 2009	Succeeded by Jung So-ra
