= Benjamin Faya =

Surinamese singer

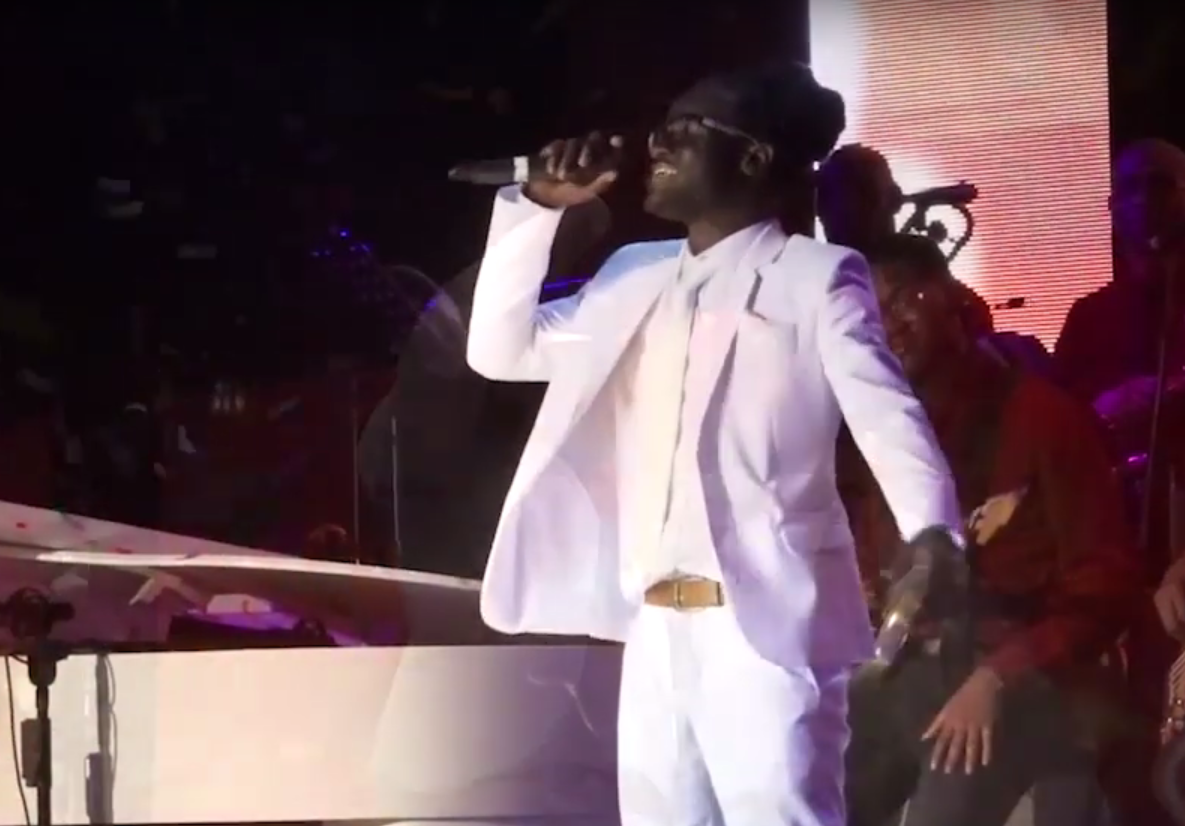
- Faya performing at SuriPop XIX (2016)

Background information
- Born: Roché Pinas; 1988 or 1989; Suriname
- Genres: reggae, dancehall

Roché Pinas (born 1988 or 1989), known professionally as Benjamin Faya, is a Surinamese singer. He primarily performs reggae and dancehall, and has had several number 1 hits on the Nationale Top 40 Suriname. In 2016, he won the national song competition SuriPop.

== Early life ==
Roché Pinas was born in 1988 or 1989. He grew up in a family with seven children; as a child, he received high marks for singing in school. He is married with three children. His employer gives him space to work on his music career, and allows him to be absent for music trips abroad.

Faya began to see success in his music career around 2015. In that year, he performed in the Poetry&Beyond Sessions, a concert series organised by the Platform Support Suriname Foundation. He was featured at the Cayenne Reggae Festival 2015 and 2016 in French Guiana. Around this time, he also had several number 1 hits on the Nationale Top 40 Suriname, including "Heartbreaker", which he dedicated to his wife.

== Breakthrough ==
In 2016, Faya entered the national song competition SuriPop; he won first prize with "Yu kori mi ati" written by Xaviera Spong. After this win, he received a number of offers to perform abroad. Apologizing to his fans in Suriname, Faya said in an interview that he would not be able to support his family with only domestic tours. He also revealed his dream to eventually perform at Madison Square Garden in New York City.

In 2017, Faya closed the Kwaku Summer Festival with the Mega Vibes Band. He also performed at the Reggae Lake Festival in Amsterdam. In Suriname, he was part of the Dobru Neti (Dobru Night) festivities. Faya and several other Surinamese artists performed with Nick & Simon at 't Vat in a concert recorded for Dutch television. In addition, he was invited to perform in the Christmas concert of De Surinaamsche Bank (DSB).

In 2018, Faya performed four concerts in the Netherlands as a member of SuriToppers, a touring supergroup of SuriPop winners. In the same year, he collaborated for the first time with the Dutch urban/kawina band PASSION and contributed two songs for their new EP. In addition, he continued to perform in Suriname, including at events such as Ketikoti and the Heerenstraat Festival.

Faya performed in a January 2020 benefit concert for the healthcare costs of singer Sisa Agi. He was to be part of the SuriToppers again in 2020, but their performances were cancelled due to pandemic restrictions in the Netherlands. He did continue to release records: in mid-2020, he and producer Carter had a number 1 hit with the song "Silence".

In 2021, Faya went to Guyana, which borders Suriname, for a promotional tour. He told Surinamese newspapers that he wants to try to break through in the Caribbean with English-language songs, and he has been working on a new album in English.

== Style ==
Faya cites Surinamese singer Powl Ameerali as a musical inspiration; in reggae, he was influenced by Garnett Silk, Richie Spice and Beres Hammond. Faya mainly performs reggae and dancehall, but has also made forays into other genres. For example, he rapped in Kevin Cruickzz's 2016 song "Turn up". In 2017, he released the Afrobeats song "Fika yu" with Skitzz and Lodilikie, and in 2018 he recorded the house song "Never give up". Faya released his first Dutch-language song in 2020, titled "Je bent van mij".
