= Vanessa Peh =

Singaporean actress (born 1994)

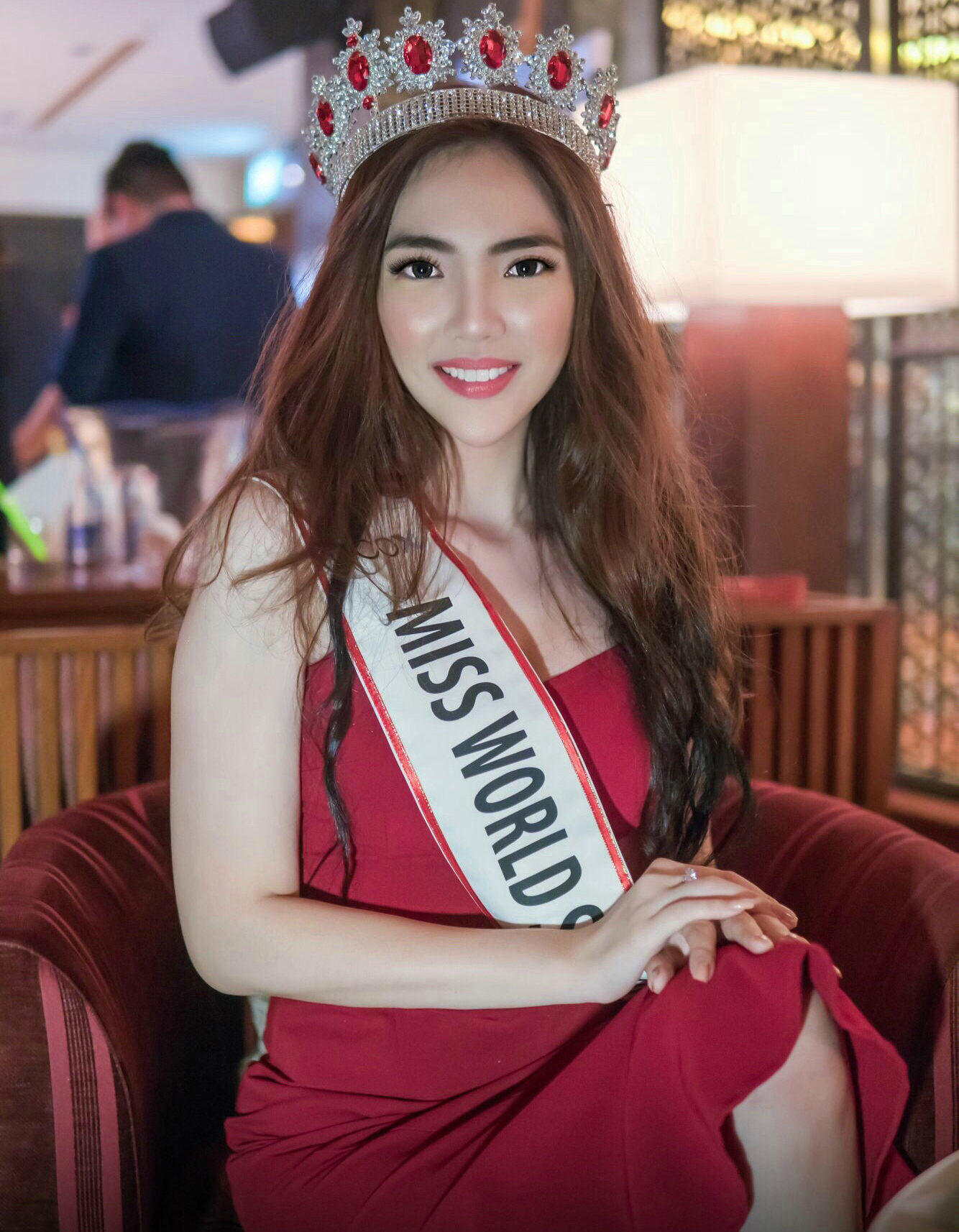
- Vanessa Peh Ting Ting Profile Image
- Born: 16 December 1994 (age 31)
- Occupations: Beauty Pageant titleholder; Actress; Model; Entrepreneur
- Height: 1.73 m (5 ft 8 in)
- Beauty pageant titleholder
- Title: Miss Singapore World 2018
- Major competitions: Miss Singapore World 2018 (Winner) (Miss Personality) (Miss Beautiful Hair); Miss World 2018 (Top 30); Head to Head Challenge; Winner Head to Head Challenge (Group 14); Winner Head to Head Challenge Round 2 Beauty with a Purpose (Top 20); Swimsuit Music Video (Top 30)

Chinese name
- Chinese: 白婷婷
Transcriptions
Standard Mandarin
- Hanyu Pinyin: Bái Tíng Tíng
Yue: Cantonese
- Yale Romanization: baahk tìhng tìhng
- Jyutping: baak6 ting4 ting4
- Website: vanessapeh.com

Vanessa Peh Ting Ting (born 16 December 1994) is a Singaporean actress, model, entrepreneur, and beauty pageant titleholder who was crowned Miss Singapore World 2018 on 14 September 2018. She represented Singapore at the Miss World 2018 pageant and advanced to the Top 30 of Miss World Grand Final.

== Personal life ==
Vanessa was raised in Singapore. Her father and mother are Chinese. She is an actress, model, and entrepreneur by profession. She has studied in Nanyang Polytechnic and majored in Medicinal Chemistry and interned at Agency for Science, Technology and Research, Institute of Molecular and Cell Biology (IMCB). She is multilingual with the ability to speak English, Mandarin, French, and Hokkien. She was also a ballet student in the Royal Academy of Dance in London and a piano student, graduating with distinctions from ABRSM.

== Pageantry ==
=== Miss Singapore World 2018 ===
Vanessa is the winner of Miss World Singapore 2018. She was crowned as Miss Singapore World 2018 pageant at Resorts World Sentosa on 14 September 2018.

In addition to the crown, she also won two subsidiary awards in the Miss World Singapore competition:

- Miss Personality
- Miss Beautiful Hair

=== Miss World 2018 ===
Peh represented Singapore at Miss World 2018 pageant in Sanya, China where she made history by advancing to the Top 30 of Miss World Grand Final.

Peh was the winner among of Group 14 in the Head-to-Head Challenge. During the Final round of Group 7 in the Head-to-Head Challenge, she won Nepal, which placed Singapore in Top 30 among 118 contestants of Miss World 2018.

== Career ==
Modelling

In 2017, Vanessa started her modelling career. She has done various commercials and campaigns for brands including but not limited to Singapore Airlines, Hewlett-Packard Singapore, Meiji Seika Singapore, Anlene, PayPal Singapore, and Philosophy (brand).

== Filmography ==
=== Television ===
==== English Series ====
| Year | Drama | Role | Notes |
|---|---|---|---|
| 2017 | Lion Mums 2 | Kylie | Channel 5 |

==== Chinese Series ====
| Year | Drama | Role | Notes |
|---|---|---|---|
| 2018 | Wonder Kiss 神奇之吻 | Sally 白雪 | Toggle Mediacorp Original Series; Wawa Pictures Production |
| 2018 | VIC 维多利亚的摸力 | Fae | Toggle Mediacorp Original Series |
| 2017 | The Convict 法网 | Min Min 敏敏 | Channel 8 |

Awards and achievements
| Preceded by Laanya Asogan | Miss Singapore World; 2018 | Succeeded by Sheen Cher |
