= SuriPop =

Surinamese music competition

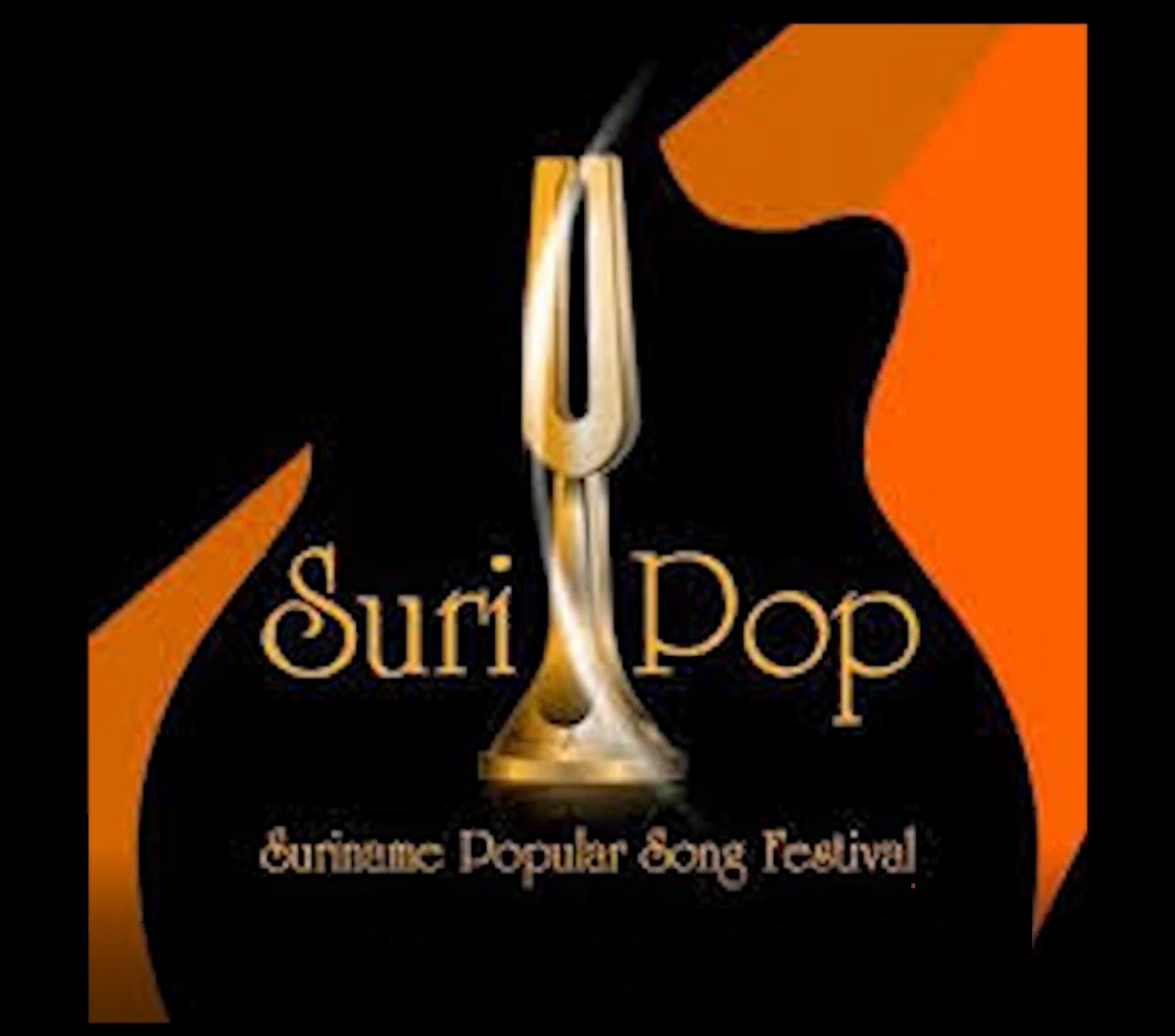
- Frequency: bi-annual
- Location: Paramaribo
- Country: Suriname
- Inaugurated: 25 November 1982
- Organiser: Stichting ter Bevordering van Kunst en Kultuur in Suriname
- Website: suripop.sr

The Suriname Popular Song Festival (commonly called SuriPop) is a biennial song festival that has taken place in Suriname since 1982. The festival is organized by the Foundation for the Promotion of Arts and Culture in Suriname (Dutch: Stichting ter Bevordering van Kunst en Kultuur in Suriname).

The event is one of the largest music events in Suriname. The first three editions of the festival were held annually, but later editions have been held every two years. The twentieth edition of the festival, SuriPop XX in 2018, was named the "Golden Edition".

== History ==
The original idea for the festival was from Juan Navia, a Chilean musician who had moved to Suriname. He founded the organization to host this festival in 1978 together with several friends, including Ruben del Prado, Werner Duttenhofer, Leni Healy, Karin Refos and Harto Soemodihardjo. The organization was set up in the office of Healy and Duttenhofer. The first edition took place in Theater Thalia; Navia selected a composition by the French composer Franck Pourcel as the theme song. Later editions of the festival were held in the AMOS Sports Arena, and since 2010 in the Anthony Nesty Sports Arena.

The first edition took place on 25 November 1982, two weeks before the December murders would send the mood of Surinamese society to a low point. According to Duttenhofer, this was reflected in the sombre tone of the songs in the 1983 edition.

Since 2011, former contestants have been invited to join the SuriToppers, a supergroup which makes annual tours in the Netherlands. The planned SuriPop in August 2020 was cancelled due to the COVID-19 pandemic in Suriname. SuriPop returned in 2022, with the final performance gala scheduled for 3 December.

== Compositions ==
The competition has two phases: pre-selection and performance. In the first phase, submitted compositions are primarily judged on melody and lyrics, while the performance is judged on presentation. Since the 2015 preselection, composers are no longer allowed to compete if they have previously won the event; this stipulation is meant to encourage new composing talent. The arrangers are given full latitude, so a song could even be changed in musical style. Nevertheless, composers retain the right to withdraw a song if the result is disappointing. After the pre-selection, twelve songs advance to the performance stage, with two additional songs held in reserve.

At the performance evening gala, vocalists chosen by the composers perform the songs accompanied by the orchestra of SuriPop. Navia was the first conductor of this orchestra. Since 2014, Ernesto van Dal has been the conductor.

The copyrights of the songs go to the organizing foundation. The festival also has sponsors since the income from record sales and festival tickets is insufficient to cover the foundation's costs, which include fees for the arrangers, vocalists, language experts, music transcribers and the release of the albums and the songs. One month before the festival, the CD album of the selected songs is released in stores. Over the following weeks, the music videos are shown on TV. This gives the public ample time to judge the songs and possibly discover if plagiarism has occurred.

== Winners ==
The festival prize is awarded to the composers. The first-place composer receives a sum of money and the Jules Chin A Foeng trophy. The second and third prizes also include cash sums, while the other finalists receive a small fixed amount.

Starting in 2006, arrangers have their own prize. Since 2016, a prize is also awarded for the best music video.

The following list shows the winning composers and songs.

Year	Edition	Title	Songwriter	Arranger	Vocalist
1982	SuriPop I	Gi yu wawan	Erik Refos and Wim Bakker	?	Powl Ameerali
1983	SuriPop II	Net alen	Winston Loe	Century (band)	Rein Carrot
1984	SuriPop III	Gi yu	Henk Mac Donald	Ronald Snijders	Rudolf Heidanus
1986	SuriPop IV	Pikin fowru	Roy Mac Donald	?	Helianthe Redan
1988	SuriPop V	Ef a kan	Erik Refos and Siegfried Gerling	Juan Navia	Powl Ameerali
1990	SuriPop VI	Wi na wan	Julius Vreden	Juan Navia	Kenneth Arias
1992	SuriPop VII	Den momenti sondro yu	Ricky Cheng A June and Howard Cheng A June	?	Ruben del Prado
1994	SuriPop VIII	Lobi singi	Martha Tjoe Ny	Marcel Balsemhof	Astrid Belliot
1996	SuriPop IX	Aku cinta padamu	Siegfried Gerling	?	Clinton Kaersenhout and Haito Doest
1998	SuriPop X	Efu geme no ben de	Guillaume Creebsburg	?	Patricia van Daal
2000	SuriPop XI	Yu na mi son	Ruth Koenders	?	Vernon Mercuur and Marjorie Declerq
2002	SuriPop XII	Tide ete	Henk Mac Donald	?	Rudolf Heidanus
2004	SuriPop XIII	Ibri yuru	Hèlène Bonoo	Bud Gaddum	Ngina Devis
2006	SuriPop XIV	Na yu sey	Bernice Hubard	Marcel Balsemhof	Meryll Malone
2008	SuriPop XV	Ala ogri e tja wang bun	Gail Eijk	Demis Wongsosoewirjo	Bryan Muntslag
2010	SuriPop XVI	Wan krin portreti	Ornyl Malone	Cherwin Muringen	Cherwin Muringen
2012	SuriPop XVII	Koloku	Sergio Emanuelson	Ornyl Malone	Lady Shaynah and Elvin Pool
2014	SuriPop XVIII	Lobi de ete	Cornelis Amafo	Robin van Geerke	Dominique Ravenberg and Rodney Deekman
2016	SuriPop XIX	Yu kori mi ati	Xaviera Spong	Ernesto van Dal	Benjamin Faya
2018	SuriPop XX "Golden Edition"	Taa fa	Byciel Watsaam	Ivan Ritfeld	Eugene Main and Lycintha Watsaam
