= Lee Sung-hye (Miss Korea) =

South Korean beauty pageant titleholder

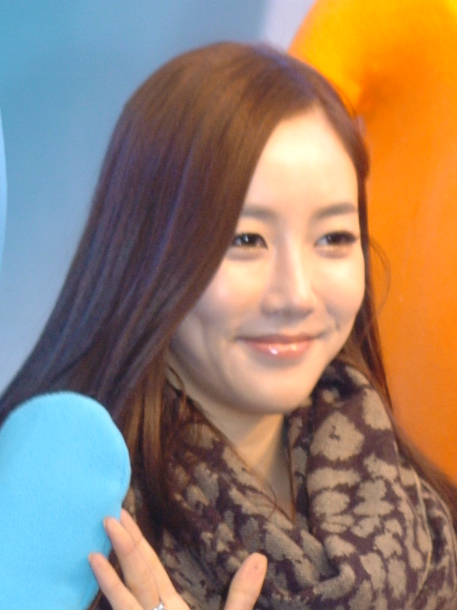
- Lee in 2012
- Born: Seoul, South Korea
- Beauty pageant titleholder
- Title: Miss Korea 2011
- Major competition: Miss Universe 2012 (Unplaced)

Lee Sung-hye (Korean: 이성혜) is a South Korean beauty pageant titleholder who was crowned Miss Korea 2011 and represented her country at Miss Universe 2012, and was unplaced.

== Pageantry ==
=== Miss Korea 2011 ===
Lee won Miss Korea 2011 at the Sejong Center for the Performing Arts in Seoul, on 3 August 2011 against 53 other contestants.

As Miss Korea 2011 she competed at Miss Universe 2012 and was unplaced.

Awards and achievements
Preceded by Chong So-ra	Miss Korea; 2011	Succeeded by Kim Yu-mi
