= Miss World 2009 =

International beauty pageant

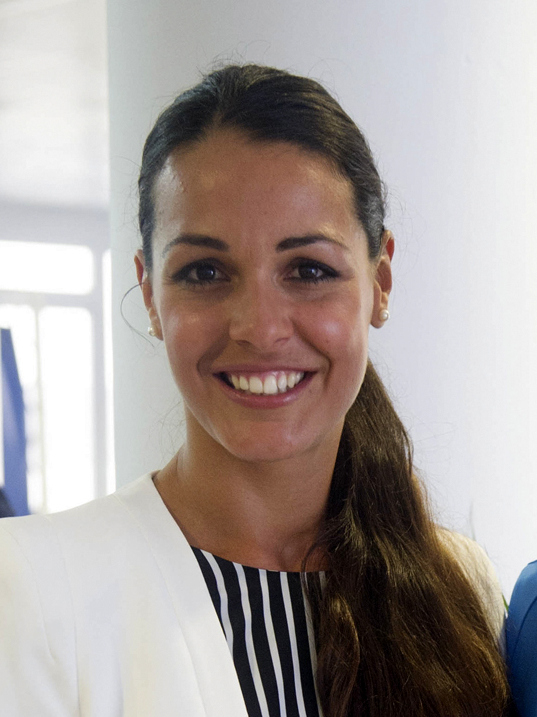
- Kaiane Aldorino
- Date: 12 December 2009
- Presenters: Steve Douglas; Angela Chow; Michelle McLean
- Entertainment: Gang of Instrumentals
- Venue: Gallagher Convention Centre, Johannesburg, South Africa
- Broadcaster: E!; SABC 3
- Entrants: 112
- Placements: 16
- Withdrawals: Antigua and Barbuda; Cayman Islands; Chile; Democratic Republic of the Congo; Saint Lucia; Seychelles; Taiwan
- Returns: Côte d'Ivoire; French Polynesia; Liberia; Luxembourg; Macedonia; Nepal; Panama; Romania; Slovenia; Suriname
- Winner: Kaiane Aldorino; Gibraltar

Miss World 2009 was the 59th edition of the Miss World pageant, held at the Gallagher Convention Centre in Johannesburg, South Africa, on 12 December 2009.

At the event's conclusion, Ksenia Sukhinova of Russia crowned Kaiane Aldorino of Gibraltar as her successor at the end of event. It is the first time that someone from Gibraltar won Miss World. The first and second runners-up we're Mexico's Perla Beltrán and South Africa's Tatum Keshwar.

== Background ==
=== Selection of participants ===
Contestants from 112 countries and territories were selected to compete in the pageant. Six of them are runners-up after the withdrawal of the original contestant in their respective countries and territories.

==== Replacements ====
Due to the media attention following the allegations against her, Rachel Christie decided to withdraw from the and relinquish her Miss England crown. She was replaced by Katrina Hodge. Alessandra Alores of Germany was disqualified due to several nude pictures of her on the Internet. She was replaced by Stefanie Peeck. Sofia Rudieva of Russia was allowed to compete in Miss Universe 2009 by the Miss Universe Organization, but the Miss World Organization did not accept her as a contestant due several nude pictures of her on the Internet. She was replaced by Ksenia Shipilova. Cinthia D'Ottone of Uruguay was replaced at the last minute by Claudia Vanrell due to D'Ottone's health related issues. Trần Thị Hương Giang was appointed to represent Vietnam at Miss World 2009. She is the 2nd runner-up of Miss Vietnam Global 2009.

Ris Low, Miss Singapore World 2009, backed out of the finals at Miss World 2009. Her decision came after a slew of negative media reports in which she incurred the ire of the public for her poor English. Later, news of her conviction for credit card fraud in May also surfaced, after she stole credit cards worth $6000. She was sentenced to two years' probation for credit card fraud. There was a national petition for her to step down. Then, Ris Low was diagnosed with bipolar disorder. The first runner-up Claire Lee, declined to represent Singapore due to a back injury which prevents her from standing for long periods of time, and also as Ris Low accused her of backstabbing her, and she withdrew from the pageant immediately. Claire Lee also rebutted Ris Low's allegations on her blog. On 9 October, ERM World Marketing announced Pilar Carmelita Arlando as the new Miss Singapore World 2009, who represented Singapore at the Miss World contest. She was criticised by many netizens for not knowing who's the first president of Singapore, not knowing how many years Singapore has been independent, and claiming that the Merlion, a symbol of Singapore, became extinct in 1965, unaware that the Merlion is a fictitious animal.

==== Returns, and, withdrawals ====
This edition saw the return of Côte d'Ivoire, French Polynesia, Liberia, Luxembourg, Macedonia, Nepal, Panama, Romania, Slovenia and Suriname; Côte d'Ivoire, which last competed in 1985, Luxembourg in 1990, French Polynesia (as Tahiti) and Liberia in 2006 and Macedonia, Nepal, Panama, Romania, Slovenia and Suriname in 2007.

Antigua and Barbuda, Cayman Islands, Chile, the Democratic Republic of the Congo, Saint Lucia and Seychelles and Taiwan, withdrew from the competition.

== Results ==
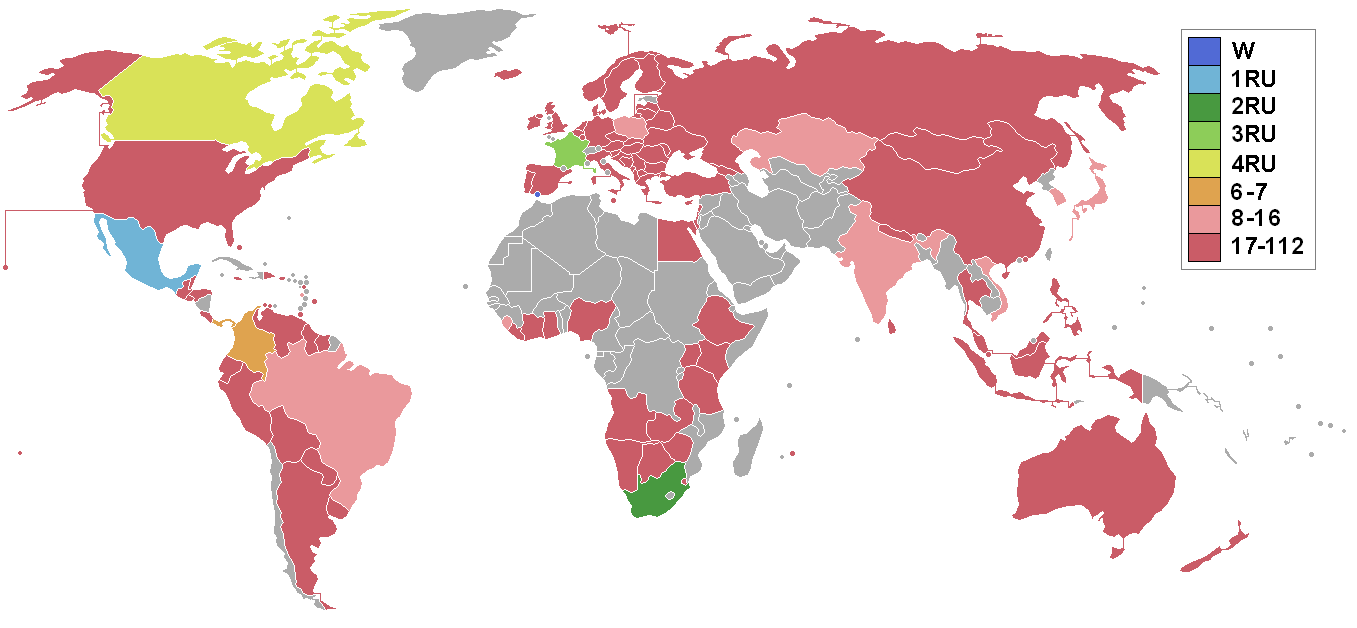
Countries and territories which sent delegates and results for Miss World 2009

=== Placements ===
Placement	Contestant
Miss World 2009	Gibraltar – Kaiane Aldorino
1st Runner-Up	Mexico – Perla Beltrán
2nd Runner-Up	South Africa – Tatum Keshwar
Top 7	Canada – Lena Ma; Colombia – Daniela Ramos; France – Chloé Mortaud; Panama – Nadege Herrera
Top 16	Brazil – Luciana Bertolini; India – Pooja Chopra; Japan – Eruza Sasaki; Kazakhstan – Dina Nuraliyeva; Martinique – Ingrid Littré; Poland – Anna Jamróz; Sierra Leone – Mariatu Kargbo; South Korea – Kim Joo-ri; Vietnam – Trần Thị Hương Giang

==== Continental Queens of Beauty ====
Continental Group	Contestant
Africa	South Africa – Tatum Keshwar
Americas	Mexico – Perla Beltrán
Asia & Oceania	South Korea – Kim Joo-ri
Caribbean	Martinique – Ingrid Littré
Europe	Gibraltar – Kaiane Aldorino

== Pageant ==
=== Selection committee ===
- Julia Morley – Chairwoman of the Miss World Organization
- Priyanka Chopra – Miss World 2000 from India
- Zhang Zilin – Miss World 2007 from China
- Mike Dixon – Musical Director
- JJ Schoeman – Designer
- Lindiwe Mahlangu-Kwele – CEO Johannesburg Tourism Company
- Graham Cooke – MD World Travel Group
- Warren Batchelor – Executive Producer of Miss World 2009

== Contestants ==
112 contestants competed for the title.

Country/Territory	Contestant	Age (Note: Ages at the time of the pageant)	Hometown
Albania	Armina Mevlani	18	Tirana
Angola	Nadia Silva	21	Cabinda
Argentina	Evelyn Lucía Manchón	23	San Luis
Aruba	Nuraisa Lispiër	24	San Nicolaas
Australia	Sophie Lavers	24	Canberra
Austria	Anna Hammel	22	Linz
Bahamas	Joanna Brown	18	Grand Bahama
Barbados	Leah Marville	23	Bridgetown
Belarus	Yulia Sindzeyeva	22	Maryina Horka
Belgium	Zeynep Sever	20	Molenbeek-Saint-Jean
Belize	Norma Leticia Lara	21	San Pedro
Bolivia	Flavia Foianini	20	Santa Cruz de la Sierra
Bosnia and Herzegovina	Andrea Šarac	18	Gacko
Botswana	Sumaiyah Marope	23	Ramotswa
Brazil	Luciana Reis	24	Belo Horizonte
Bulgaria	Antonia Petrova	25	Pernik
Canada	Lena Ma	22	North York
China	Yu Sheng	22	Anhui
Colombia	Daniela Ramos	21	Cali
Costa Rica	Angie Alfaro	18	Alajuela
Côte d'Ivoire	Dacoury Rosine Gnago	21	Yamoussoukro
Croatia	Ivana Vasilj	21	Zagreb
Curaçao	Chantalle Thomassen	24	Willemstad
Cyprus	Christalla Tsiali	18	Larnaca
Czech Republic	Aneta Vignerová	21	Havířov
Denmark	Nadia Pederson	25	Copenhagen
Dominican Republic	Ana Contreras	25	Bayaguana
Ecuador	Gabriela Ulloa	22	Esmeraldas
Egypt	Samah Shalaby	23	Cairo
El Salvador	Elena Tedesco	18	San Salvador
England	Katrina Hodge	22	Royal Tunbridge Wells
Ethiopia	Lula Gezu Weldegebriel	20	Addis Ababa
Finland	Sanna Kankaanpää	24	Turku
France	Chloé Mortaud	19	Bénac
French Polynesia (Note: Competed as Tahiti in the pageant)	Nanihi Bambridge	19	Papeete
Georgia	Tsira Suknidze	19	Chiatura
Germany	Stefanie Peeck	22	Schwerin
Ghana	Mawuse Appea	23	Legon
Gibraltar	Kaiane Aldorino	23	Gibraltar
Greece	Alkisti Anyfanti	23	Athens
Guadeloupe	Béatrice Blaise	22	Basse-Terre
Guatemala	Alida Boer	24	Guatemala City
Guyana	Imarah Radix	24	Georgetown
Honduras	Blaise Masey	19	San Pedro Pula
Hong Kong	Sandy Lau	23	Hong Kong
Hungary	Orsolya Serdült	22	Budapest
Iceland	Guðrún Dögg Rúnarsdóttir	18	Akranes
India	Pooja Chopra	24	Pune
Indonesia	Kerenina Sunny Halim	23	Jakarta
Ireland	Laura Patterson	19	Derry
Israel	Adi Rudnitzky	20	Tel Aviv
Italy	Alice Taticchi	19	Perugia
Jamaica	Kerrie Baylis	21	Surrey
Japan	Eruza Sasaki	21	Okinawa
Kazakhstan	Dina Nuraliyeva	24	Shymkent
Kenya	Fiona Konchellah	20	Nairobi
Latvia	Ieva Lase	21	Riga
Lebanon	Martine Andraos	19	Beirut
Liberia	Shu-rina Wiah	22	Monrovia
Lithuania	Vaida Petraškaitė	23	Kaunas
Luxembourg	Diana Nilles	21	Walferdange
Macedonia	Suzana Al-Salkini	25	Skopje
Malaysia	Thanuja Ananthan	24	Kuala Lumpur
Malta	Shanel Debattista	23	Pietà
Martinique	Ingrid Littré	22	Fort-de-France
Mauritius	Anaïs Veerapatren	23	Curepipe
Mexico	Perla Beltrán	23	Guamúchil
Moldova	Maria Bragaru	18	Chișinău
Mongolia	Battsetseg Batbaatar	24	Ulaanbaatar
Montenegro	Marijana Pokrajac	22	Podgorica
Namibia	Happie Ntelamo	21	Katima Mulilo
Nepal	Zenisha Moktan	20	Kathmandu
Netherlands	Avalon-Chanel Weyzig	19	Zwolle
New Zealand	Magdalena Schoeman	19	Christchurch
Nigeria	Glory Chukwu	24	Lafia
Northern Ireland	Cherie Gardiner	18	Bangor
Norway	Sara Skjoldnes	18	Skien
Panama	Nadege Herrera	22	Panama City
Paraguay	Tamara Sosa	20	Asunción
Peru	Claudia Carrasco	21	Cusco
Philippines	Marie-Ann Umali	22	Batangas City
Poland	Anna Jamróz	22	Rumia
Portugal	Marta Cadilha	24	Viana do Castelo
Puerto Rico	Jennifer Colón	21	Bayamón
Romania	Loredana Salanţă	18	Bistrița
Russia	Ksenia Shipilova	18	Kokhma
Scotland	Katharine Brown	22	Dunblane
Serbia	Jelena Marković	21	Užice
Sierra Leone	Mariatu Kargbo	24	Freetown
Singapore	Pilar Arlando	20	Singapore
Slovakia	Barbora Franeková	21	Žilina
Slovenia	Tina Petelin	24	Maribor
South Africa	Tatum Keshwar	25	Durban
South Korea (Note: Competed as Korea in the pageant)	Kim Joo-ri	21	Seoul
Spain	Carmen García	22	Granada
Sri Lanka	Gamya Wijayadasa	23	Malabe
Suriname	Zoureena Rijger	18	Paramaribo
Swaziland	Nompilo Mncina	23	Mbabane
Sweden	Erica Harrison	18	Stockholm
Tanzania	Miriam Gerald	21	Mwanza
Thailand	Pongchanok Kanklab	18	Bangkok
Trinidad and Tobago	Ashanna Arthur	22	Port-of-Spain
Turkey	Ebru Şam	18	Solingen
Uganda	Maria Namiiro	21	Kampala
Ukraine	Evheniya Tulchevska	19	Dnipro
United States	Lisa-Marie Kohrs	22	Malibu
Uruguay	Claudia Vanrell	22	Montevideo
Venezuela	María Milagros Véliz	23	Guacara
Vietnam	Trần Thị Hương Giang	22	Hải Dương
Wales	Lucy Whitehouse	22	Barry, Vale of Glamorgan
Zambia	Sekwila Mumba	23	Kabwe
Zimbabwe	Vanessa Sibanda	21	Harare

== Notes ==
=== Did not compete ===
- Grenada - Tamara Lawrence
- Saint Kitts and Nevis – Venetta Zakers, the winner of the Miss World Saint Kitts and Nevis 2009 pageant, did not compete in Miss World 2009 due to communication problems between her and the national pageant organisation. However, the pageant was held again in 2010 to select the representative for Miss World 2010.
