= Thalia Theatre (Paramaribo) =

Market place in Paramaribo, Suriname

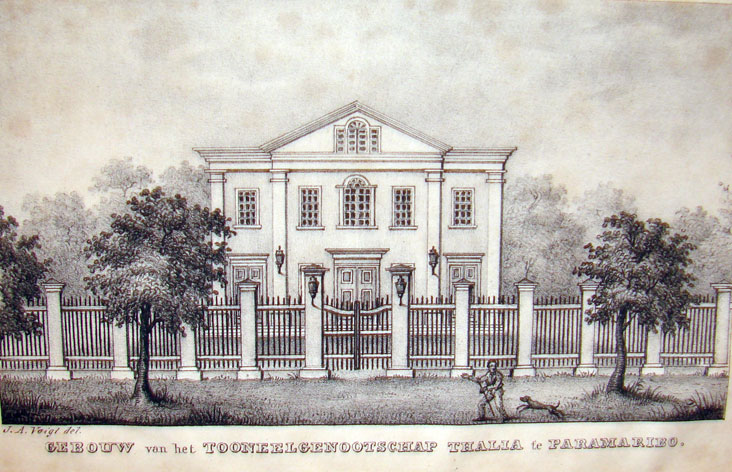
- Thalia Theatre in the 1850s
- Interactive map of Thalia Theatre
- Address: Dr. J. F. Nassylaan; Paramaribo; Suriname
- Coordinates: 5.83037°N 55.16002°W
- Capacity: 500

Construction
- Opened: 20 January 1840
- Renovated: 2011
- Architect: Johan August Voigt

Thalia Theatre is a theatre in Paramaribo, Suriname. The theatre opened on 20 January 1840.

== Overview ==
The Thalia Theatre Company was founded on 27 April 1837. In December 1837, a terrain on the Dr. J. F. Nassylaan was acquired. The theatre was built by architect Johan August Voigt with a capacity of 700 seats, and opened on 20 January 1840. Slaves and people on barefoot were initially not allowed in the theatre.

In the late 19th century, there was disagreement about the future direction of the theatre. On 4 February 1894, former chairman Wessels postulated that there were two kinds of members: anarchists and conservatives. The staging of a play dedicated to the governor van Wijck culminated in a public fistfight and the hospitalisation of one member of the theatre.

In the 1950s, the theatre started to focus on producing their own plays and started to perform some plays in Sranan Tongo, the Creole spoken in Suriname. The theatre company Pohama performed at Thalia as well, and was known for their 1 July event dedicated to the emancipation of slavery in Suriname.

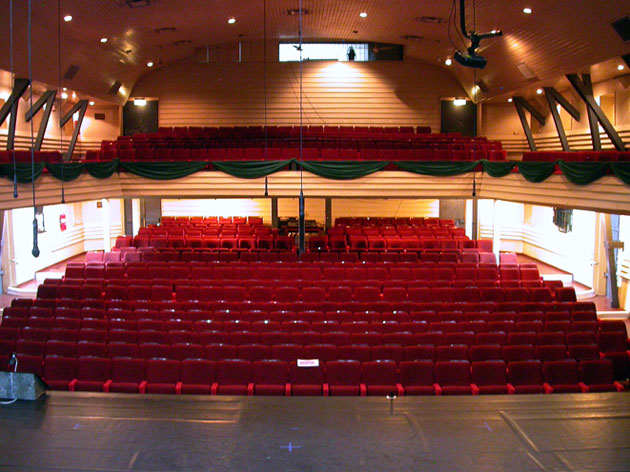
Inside the theatre

In the late 20th century, the building was in poor shape, and even demolition was considered. In 2011, Thalia Theatre was restored, and reopened with reduced capacity of 500 seats.

== Bibliography ==
- Kempen, Michiel van (2002). Een geschiedenis van de Surinaamse literatuur. Deel 3. Paramaribo: Okopipi. ISBN 99914-640-4-2.
