= Miss World 2013 =

International beauty pageant

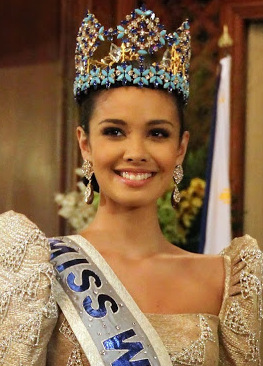
- Megan Young, Miss World 2013
- Date: 28 September 2013
- Presenters: Myleene Klass; Kamal Ibrahim; Daniel Mananta; Amanda Zevannya; Steve Douglas
- Entertainment: Blue; Matt Cardle
- Venue: Bali Nusa Dua Convention Center, South Kuta, Bali, Indonesia
- Broadcaster: Star World; E!; RCTI
- Entrants: 127
- Placements: 20
- Debuts: Cameroon; Guinea; Guinea-Bissau; Kosovo; Uzbekistan
- Withdrawals: Bonaire; Israel; Macau; Malawi; Sierra Leone; Suriname; Uruguay; Zimbabwe
- Returns: British Virgin Islands; Dominica; Ghana; Haiti; Kyrgyzstan; Lesotho; Moldova; Namibia; Romania; Samoa; Switzerland; Taiwan; Tunisia; Zambia
- Winner: Megan Young; Philippines

Miss World 2013 was the 63rd edition of the Miss World pageant, held at the Bali International Convention Center in Bali, South Kuta, Indonesia, on 28 September 2013.

At the end of the event, Yu Wenxia of China crowned Megan Young of the Philippines, as her successor, marking the only time to date that the Philippines has won the Miss World title. This victory also made the Philippines the third country to win all of the Big Four international beauty pageants and the first Southeast Asian country to capture the title. The first and second runners-up of this year's edition was France's Marine Lorphelin and Ghana's Carranzar Naa Okailey Shooter.

== Background ==
=== Location and date ===
It was the first time in Southeast Asia and it also was the first time in the pageant's history that the event was held in a Muslim majority country.

After protests from hard-line Islamic extremism groups threatened to force the pageant out of Indonesia, the national government announced that the finals would be moved from a venue near the capital city, to a venue on the predominantly Hindu island of Bali. Furthermore, Miss World Organization Chairperson Julia Morley replaced the "Beach Fashion" bikini swimsuit event, with a "Balinese Beach Fabric" sarong cloth event.

=== Selection of participants ===
Contestants from 127 countries and territories competed in this year's Miss World pageant.

==== Debuts, returns, and withdrawals ====
This edition saw the debut of Cameroon, Guinea, Guinea-Bissau, Kosovo and Uzbekistan, and the return of The British Virgin Islands, Dominica, Ghana, Haiti, Kyrgyzstan, Lesotho, Moldova, Namibia, Romania, Samoa, Switzerland, Taiwan, Tunisia and Zambia; Haiti, which last competed in 1975, Dominica and Tunisia in 1978, Samoa (as Western Samoa) in 1988, The British Virgin Islands in 2001, Switzerland in 2005, Taiwan (as Chinese Taipei) in 2008, Lesotho and Zambia in 2010, and Ghana, Kyrgyzstan, Moldova, Namibia and Romania in 2011.

Bonaire, Macau, Malawi, Sierra Leone, Suriname, Uruguay and Zimbabwe, withdrew from the competition. Yityish Titi Aynaw of Israel, withdrew due to political reason regarding to Indonesia being an Islamic country. Later competed at Miss Universe 2013 in Moscow.

== Results ==
=== Placements ===
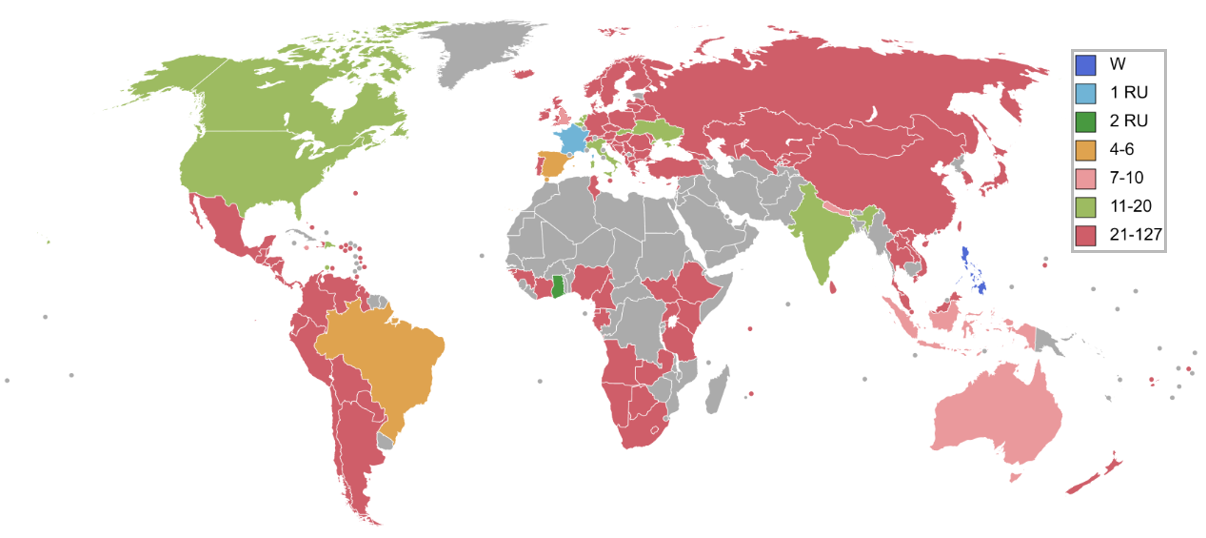
Miss world 2013 participating countries and territories

| Placement | Contestant |
|---|---|
| Miss World 2013 | Philippines – Megan Young |
| 1st Runner-Up | France – Marine Lorphelin |
| 2nd Runner-Up | Ghana – Carranzar Naa Okailey Shooter |
| Top 6 | Brazil – Sancler Frantz; Gibraltar – Maroua Kharbouch §; Spain – Elena Ibarbia |
| Top 10 | Australia – Erin Holland; England – Kirsty Heslewood; Indonesia – Vania Larissa Tan; Jamaica - Gina Hargitay; Nepal – Ishani Shrestha |
| Top 20 | Aruba – Larissa Leeuwe; Belgium – Noémie Happart; Canada – Camille Munro; Dominican Republic – Joely Bernat; India – Navneet Kaur Dhillon; Italy – Sarah Baderna; Netherlands – Jacqueline Steenbeek; Slovakia – Karolína Chomistekova; Ukraine – Anna Zayachkivska; United States – Olivia Jordan |

§ — People's Choice winner; Not part of the Top 20
(Voted into the Top 6 by viewers)

==== Continental Queens of Beauty ====
| Continental Group | Contestant |
|---|---|
| Africa | Ghana – Carranzar Naa Okailey Shooter |
| Americas | Brazil – Sancler Frantz |
| Asia | Philippines – Megan Young |
| Caribbean | Jamaica – Gina Hargitay |
| Europe | France – Marine Lorphelin |
| Oceania | Australia – Erin Holland |

== Challenge events ==
There were six challenge events. They were Beach Fashion, Beauty With a Purpose, Multimedia, Sport, Talent, and Top Model. Important points were awarded to each winner. All six winners went through to the Top 20.

=== Beach Beauty ===
Sancler Frantz of Brazil won Miss World Beach Beauty 2013.

| Placement | Contestant |
|---|---|
| Winner | Brazil - Sancler Frantz |
| 1st Runner-up | France - Marine Lorphelin |
| 2nd Runner-up | Ghana - Carranzar Naa Okailey |
| 3rd Runner-up | Jamaica - Gina Hargitay |
| 4th Runner-up | Philippines - Megan Young |
| Top 11 | China - Wei Wei Yu; Indonesia - Vania Larissa; Italia - Sarah Baderna; Moldova - Valeriya Tsurkan; Spain - Elena Ibarbia; Ukraine - Anna Zayachkivska |

=== Beauty With a Purpose ===
Ishani Shrestha of Nepal won Miss World Beauty With a Purpose 2013.

| Placement | Contestant |
|---|---|
| Winner | Nepal - Ishani Shrestha |
| 1st Runner-up | Australia - Erin Holland |
| 2nd Runner-up | Tanzania - Brigitte Alfred Lyimo |
| 3rd Runner-up | Belgium - Noemie Happart |
| 4th Runner-up | Brazil - Sancler Frantz |
| Top 10 | Aruba - Larissa Leeuwe; England - Kirsty Heslewood; France - Marine Lorphelin; Ghana - Carranzar Naa Okailey; India - Navneet Kaur Dhillon |

=== Multimedia ===
Navneet Kaur Dhillon of India won Miss World Multimedia 2013.

| Placement | Contestant |
|---|---|
| Winner | India - Navneet Kaur Dhillon |
| 1st Runner-up | Thailand - Kanyapak Phokesomboon |
| 2nd Runner-up | Nepal - Ishani Shrestha |
| 3rd Runner-up | Philippines - Megan Young |
| 4th Runner-up | Malaysia - Melinder Bhullar |

=== Sports and Fitness ===
Jacqueline Steenbeek of Netherlands won Miss World Sport and Fitness 2013.

| Placement | Contestant |
|---|---|
| Winner | Netherlands – Jacqueline Steenbeek |
| 1st Runner-up | Spain – Elena Ibarbia |
| 2nd Runner-up | Northern Ireland – Meagan Green |
| 3rd Runner-up | Paraguay – Coral Ruíz |
| 4th Runner-up | El Salvador – Paola Ayala |
| Top 20 | Aruba – Larisa Leeuwe; Belgium – Noemie Happart; Cyprus – Kristi-Mari Agapiou; Dominican Republic – Joely Bernat; England – Kirsty Heslewood; Hungary - Annamaria Rakosi; Italy - Sarah Baderna; Montenegro - Ivana Milojko; New Zealand - Ella Langsford; Nicaragua - Luz Decena; Panama - Virginia Hernandez; Peru - Elba Fahsbender; Scotland - Jamey Bowers; Slovakia - Karolína Chomisteková |

=== Talent ===
Vania Larissa of Indonesia won Miss World Talent 2013

| Placement | Contestant |
|---|---|
| Winner | Indonesia – Vania Larissa |
| 1st Runner-up | Australia – Erin Holland |
| 2nd Runner-up | Ukraine – Anna Zayachkivska |
| 3rd Runner-up | British Virgin Islands – Kirtis Malone |
| 4th Runner-up | Canada – Camille Munro |
| Top 11 | Cameroon – Denise Valerie Ayena; Dominica – Leslassa Armour-Shillingford; Hongkong – Jacqueline Wong; Panama – Virginia Hernandez; Slovakia – Karolína Chomisteková; Trinidad and Tobago – Sherrece Villafana; Wales – Gabrielle Shaw |

=== Top Model ===
Megan Young of Philippines won Miss World Top Model 2013.

| Placement | Contestant |
|---|---|
| Winner | Philippines – Megan Young |
| 1st Runner-up | United States - Olivia Jordan |
| 2nd Runner-up | France – Marine Lorphelin |
| 3rd Runner-up | Ukraine - Anna Zayachkivska |
| 4th Runner-up | Brazil - Sancler Frantz |
| Top 10 | Cameroon - Denise Valerie Ayena; Cyprus - Kristi-Mari Agapiou; England - Kirsty Heslewood; Italy - Sarah Baderna; South Sudan - Manuela Matong |

== Judges ==
The judges for Miss World 2013 were:

- Julia Morley – Chairman of the Miss World Organization
- Donna Derby
- Derek Wheeler
- Mike Dixon – Musical director
- Andrew Minarik
- Vineet Jain
- Azra Akın – Miss World 2002 from Turkey
- Maurice Montgomery Haughton-James
- Ken Warwick
- Liliana Tanoesoedibjo – Owner and National Director of Miss Indonesia.
- Liestyana Irman Gusman
- Silvia Agung Laksono
- Coretta Kapoyos Bayuseno

== Contestants ==
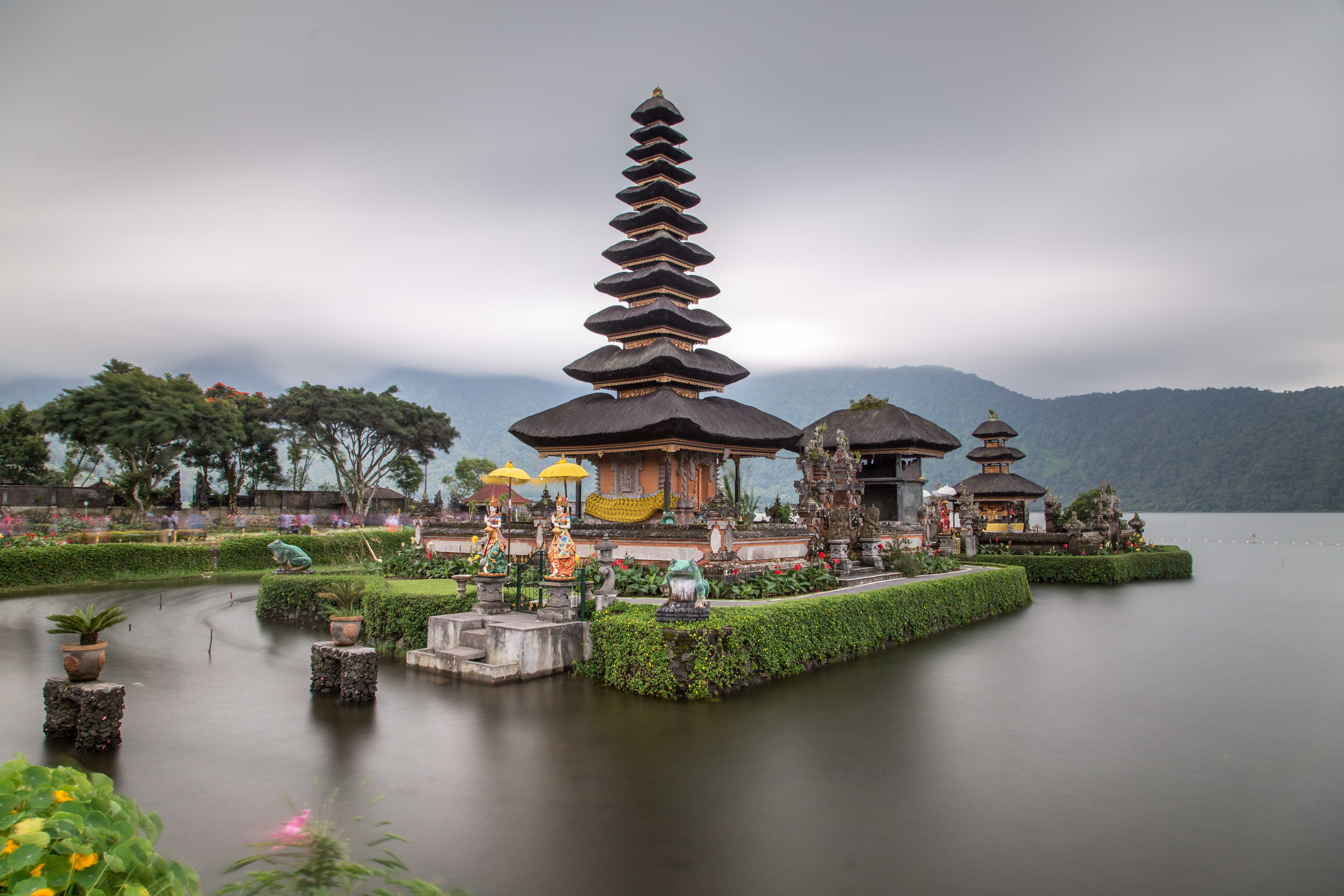
Nusa Dua, Bali - Indonesia, host city of Miss World 2013.

127 Contestants competed for the title.

| Country/Territory | Contestant | Age (Note: Ages at the time in the pageant) | Hometown |
|---|---|---|---|
| Albania | Ersela Kurti | 22 | Tirana |
| Angola | Maria Castelo | 23 | Uíge |
| Argentina | Teresa Kuster | 24 | Buenos Aires |
| Aruba | Larisa Leeuwe | 22 | Oranjestad |
| Australia | Erin Holland | 24 | Cairns |
| Austria | Ena Kadić † | 23 | Innsbruck |
| (The Bahamas) Bahamas | De'Andra Bannister | 24 | Nassau |
| Barbados | Regina Ramjit | 19 | Bridgetown |
| Belarus | Maryia Vialichka | 22 | Vitebsk |
| Belgium | Noémie Happart | 20 | Liège |
| Belize | Idolly Louise Saldivar | 22 | Belmopan |
| Bermuda | Katherine Arnfield | 18 | Hamilton |
| Bolivia | Alejandra Castillo | 20 | Tarija |
| Bosnia and Herzegovina | Sanda Gutić | 19 | Sarajevo |
| Botswana | Rosemary Keofitlhetse | 20 | Gaborone |
| Brazil | Sancler Frantz | 21 | Arroio do Tigre |
| British Virgin Islands | Kirtis Malone | 21 | Tortola |
| Bulgaria | Nansi Karaboycheva | 20 | Pazardzhik |
| Cameroon | Denise Valerie Ayena | 22 | Yaoundé |
| Canada | Camille Munro | 24 | Regine |
| Chile | Camila Andrade | 22 | Concepción |
| China | Yu Weiwei | 25 | Ankang |
| Colombia | Daniela Ocoro | 23 | Cali |
| Costa Rica | Yarley Marín | 23 | Puntarenas |
| (Ivory Coast) Côte d'Ivoire | Aïssata Dia | 21 | Aboisso |
| Croatia | Lana Gržetić | 18 | Rijeka |
| Curaçao | Xafira Urselita | 18 | Willemstad |
| Cyprus | Kristi-Mari Agapiou | 20 | Nicosia |
| Czech Republic | Lucie Kovandová | 19 | Dolní Kounice |
| Denmark | Malene Riis Sorensen | 20 | Haderslev |
| Dominica | Leslassa Armour-Shillingford | 19 | Roseau |
| Dominican Republic | Joely Bernat | 24 | Bronx |
| Ecuador | Laritza Párraga | 19 | Santo Domingo |
| El Salvador | Paola Ayala | 18 | San Salvador |
| England | Kirsty Heslewood | 24 | London |
| Equatorial Guinea | Restituta Mifumu Nguema | 19 | Micomeseng |
| Ethiopia | Genet Tsegay | 22 | Mekele |
| Fiji | Caireen Erbsleben | 21 | Suva |
| Finland | Maija Kerisalmi | 20 | Nokia |
| France | Marine Lorphelin | 20 | Charnay-lès-Mâcon |
| Gabon | Brunilla Moussadingou | 19 | Lambarene |
| (Georgia (country)) Georgia | Tamar Shedania | 21 | Zugdidi |
| Germany | Amina Sabbah | 18 | Jena |
| Ghana | Carranzar Shooter | 22 | Accra |
| Gibraltar | Maroua Kharbouch | 22 | Gibraltar |
| Greece | Athina Pikraki | 21 | Athens |
| Guadeloupe | Sheryna van der Koelen | 21 | Saint-François |
| Guam | Camarin Mendiola | 18 | Agana Heights |
| Guatemala | Karla Loraine Quinto | 25 | Guatemala City |
| Guinea | Mariama Diallo | 22 | Conakry |
| Guinea-Bissau | Heny Tavares | 21 | Bafatá |
| Guyana | Ruqayyah Boyer | 23 | Georgetown |
| Haiti | Ketsia Iciena Lioudy | 19 | Cap-Haïtien |
| Honduras | Mónica Elwin | 19 | Roatan |
| Hong Kong | Jacqueline Wong | 24 | Hong Kong |
| Hungary | Annamaria Rakosi | 21 | Debrecen |
| Iceland | Sigríður Dagbjört Ásgeirsdóttir | 22 | Reykjavík |
| India | Navneet Kaur Dhillon | 20 | Patiala |
| Indonesia | Vania Larissa Tan | 17 | Pontianak |
| (Republic of Ireland) Ireland | Aoife Walsh | 23 | Clonmel |
| Italy | Sarah Baderna | 22 | Castell'Arquato |
| Jamaica | Gina Hargitay | 18 | Kingston |
| Japan | Michiko Tanaka | 23 | Shizuoka |
| Kazakhstan | Ainura Toleuova | 18 | Taldykorgan |
| Kenya | Wangui Gitonga | 23 | Mombasa |
| Kosovo | Antigona Sejdiju | 19 | Pristina |
| Kyrgyzstan | Zhibek Nukeeva † | 19 | Bishkek |
| Latvia | Eva Dombrovska | 22 | Jelgava |
| Lebanon | Karen Ghrawi | 22 | Beirut |
| Lesotho | Mamahlape Matsoso | 19 | Maseru |
| Lithuania | Rūta Mazurevičiūtė | 22 | Garliava |
| (North Macedonia) Macedonia | Kristina Spasenoska | 21 | Kičevo |
| Malaysia | Melinder Bhullar | 20 | Kuala Lumpur |
| Malta | Donna Leyland | 24 | Attard |
| Martinique | Julie Lebrasseur | 19 | Ducos |
| Mauritius | Nathalie Lesage | 18 | Grand Baie |
| Mexico | Marilyn Chagoya | 23 | Poza Rica |
| Moldova | Valeriya Tsurkan | 21 | Tiraspol |
| Mongolia | Pagmadulam Sukhbaatar | 20 | Ulaanbaatar |
| Montenegro | Ivana Milojko | 19 | Kotor |
| Namibia | Paulina Malulu | 24 | Windhoek |
| Nepal | Ishani Shrestha | 21 | Kathmandu |
| Netherlands | Jacqueline Steenbeek | 23 | Drunen |
| New Zealand | Ella Langsford | 20 | Auckland |
| Nicaragua | Luz Mery Decena Rivera | 23 | Jalapa |
| Nigeria | Anna Banner | 18 | Bayelsa |
| Northern Ireland | Meagan Green | 23 | Lisburn |
| Norway | Alexandra Backstrom | 23 | Oslo |
| Panama | Virginia Hernández | 23 | Panama City |
| Paraguay | Coral Ruiz Reyes | 22 | Luque |
| Peru | Elba Fahsbender | 21 | Lima |
| Philippines | Megan Young | 23 | Olongapo |
| Poland | Katarzyna Krzeszowska | 22 | Krynica-Zdrój |
| Portugal | Elisabete Rodrigues | 20 | Porto |
| Puerto Rico | Nadyalee Torres | 25 | Caguas |
| Romania | Andreea Chiru | 20 | Braila |
| Russia | Elmira Abdrazakova | 18 | Mezhdurechensk |
| Saint Kitts and Nevis | Trevicia Adams | 22 | Basseterre |
| Samoa | Penina Paeu | 21 | Apia |
| Scotland | Jamey Bowers | 24 | Edinburgh |
| Serbia | Aleksandra Doknić | 18 | Požarevac |
| Seychelles | Agnes Gerry | 19 | Victoria |
| Singapore | Maria-Anna Zenieris | 18 | Singapore |
| Slovakia | Karolína Chomisteková | 19 | Oravský Podzámok |
| Slovenia | Maja Cotič | 24 | Nova Gorica |
| South Africa | Marilyn Ramos | 22 | Klerksdorp |
| South Korea (Note: Competed as Korea in the pageant) | Min-ji Park | 24 | Busan |
| South Sudan | Modong Manuela | 21 | Juba |
| Spain | Elena Ibarbia | 18 | San Sebastián |
| Sri Lanka | Iresha Asanki de Silva | 22 | Colombo |
| Sweden | Agneta Myhrman | 19 | Stockholm |
| Switzerland | Cindy Williner | 18 | Zürich |
| (Chinese Taipei) Taiwan (Note: Competed as Chinese Taipei in the pageant) | Cinzia Chang | 21 | Taipei |
| Tanzania | Brigitte Lyimo | 20 | Dar es Salaam |
| Thailand | Natalie Phoksomboon | 22 | Udon Thani |
| Trinidad and Tobago | Sherrece Villafana | 19 | San Fernando |
| Tunisia | Hiba Telmoudi | 22 | Gabes |
| Turkey | Rüveyda Öksüz | 19 | Istanbul |
| Uganda | Stellah Nantumbwe | 22 | Kampala |
| Ukraine | Anna Zayachkivska | 21 | Ivano-Frankivsk |
| United States | Olivia Jordan | 25 | Tulsa |
| United States Virgin Islands | Petra Cabrera | 21 | Charlotte Amalie |
| Uzbekistan | Rakhima Ganieva | 18 | Tashkent |
| Venezuela | Karen Soto | 21 | Maracaibo |
| Vietnam | Lại Hương Thảo | 22 | Quảng Ninh |
| Wales | Gabrielle Shaw | 19 | Wrexham |
| Zambia | Christine Mwaaba | 25 | Lusaka |

== Notes ==
=== Designations ===
- Belarus – Maryia Vialichka was appointed to represent Belarus, after no national pageant was held because the Miss Belarus pageant is a bi-annual event. It was last time held in 2012. Maria won the title of Miss Charity at the Miss Belarus 2012 pageant.
- British Virgin Islands – Kirtis Kassandra Malone was appointed as Miss World British Virgin Islands 2013. The Miss World British Virgin Islands Committee acquired the franchise license from the Miss World organisation this year.
- Cyprus – Kristy Marie Agapiou was appointed to represent Cyprus, she was the 1st runner-up at the Star Cyprus 2011 pageant.
- Guyana – Ruqayyah Boyer was appointed Miss Guyana 2013 after Natasha Martindale became the new national director in Guyana.
- Iceland – Sigríður Dagbjört Ásgeirsdóttir was appointed to represent Iceland, she was the 2nd runner-up at the Ungfrú Island 2011 pageant.
- Kazakhstan – Aynur Toleuova was appointed to represent Kazakhstan. She was previously Miss Kazakhstan 2011.
- Mongolia – Pagmadulam Sukhbaatar was appointed as Miss World Mongolia 2013 after a casting call took place.
- Nicaragua – Luz Decena was appointed as Miss Mundo Nicaragua 2013 by Denis Davila, national director of Miss World in Nicaragua.
- Norway – Alexandra Backström was appointed as Miss World Norway 2013 after a casting call took place.
- Saint Kitts and Nevis – Trevicia Adams was appointed as Miss World St. Kitts & Nevis 2013 by Eversley Liburd & Joan Millard, national directors of Miss World in St. Kitts & Nevis.
- South Korea – Park Min-ji was appointed to represent Korea. She was the 2nd runner-up at the Miss World Korea 2011 pageant.
- United States – Olivia Jordan, a native of Tulsa, Oklahoma, was appointed to represent United States. She was the 1st runner-up at the Miss California USA 2013 pageant. Later competed at Miss USA 2015 as Miss Oklahoma USA and won the title and competed at Miss Universe 2015 and placed as 2nd runner-up.
- Vietnam – Thảo Lại Hương was appointed to represent Vietnam. The permission was granted by the Ministry of Culture of Vietnam, which authorises the international representation of the nation in events of any kind. Thảo was crowned Miss Sport Vietnam 2012.
- Zambia – Christine Mwaaba was appointed to represent Zambia, she was the 2nd runner-up at the Miss Zambia 2010 pageant.

=== Replacements ===
- Hong Kong – The reigning Miss Hong Kong Carat Cheung was replaced by her 1st runner-up Jacqueline Wong due to being over-age.
- Serbia – Nikolina Bojić was replaced by Aleksandra Doknić the 1st runner-up of Miss Serbia 2012, after being withdrawn because of her marriage to Canadian tennis player Frank Dancevic.

=== Withdrawals ===
- Suriname – Rachel De La Fuente
- Uruguay – Mercedes Bissio Del Puerto

=== Did not compete ===
Note: These countries were to debut or return at Miss World, but did not compete.

- Benin
- Cape Verde - Christina Spencer
- Greenland - Dianne Illiansen
- Grenada - Priscilla Collingsworth
- Madagascar
- Mozambique
- Rwanda
- São Tomé and Príncipe
