= Mimi Areme =

Ghanaian model and beauty pageant titleholder

- Born: Mimi Areme; September 28, 1988 (age 38); Volta Region, Ghana
- Height: 1.73 m (5 ft 8 in)
- Beauty pageant titleholder
- Major competitions: Miss World 2010 (1st Runner Up Beauty With A Purpose); Miss Ghana 2009 (Winner)

Mimi Areme (September 28, 1988) is a Ghanaian model and beauty pageant titleholder who was crowned Miss Ghana 2009. Areme later competed in the Miss World 2010 pageant in the southern Chinese city of Sanya on October 30, where Miss USA, Alexandria Mills, was crowned the overall winner.

== Early life ==
Mimi Areme is the only child in her family, her Mom (Betty Hogar) is a Christian while her dad (Ali Areme-Yawo) is a Muslim. She's a student of Reading Marketing in Sunyani Polytechnic Ghana. Her biggest dream is to have a marketing company in order to employ people in her country to help unemployment level and to help people make a good living.

== Miss Ghana 2009 ==
Twenty-year-old Miss Mimi Areme, an HND Marketing student of the Sunyani Polytechnic, was elected Miss Ghana 2009 at the grand finale of the national pageant at the Accra International Conference Centre.

As part of her pageant prize, Ms. Areme drove home a new Tata Safari 4X4 automobile. The car keys were handed to her by the Minister of Tourism, Mrs Juliana Azumah-Mensah, moments after Areme was declared Ghana's 2009 beauty queen by 2008 winner, Miss Mawuse Appea. The car prize included a one-year servicing warranty from PHC Motors. Areme also received a GHc200 monthly allowance for one year, 10 gallons of fuel per week for one year, four pieces of ATL fabric every month for one year, and several other alluring indulgences. As Miss Ghana, Areme also became entitled to represent Ghana in the Miss World Pageant.

Areme's message , re-echoes the US president Barack Obama's challenge to Africa's youth to take their Destiny into their own hands and to overcome challenges and confront the continent. Her emphatic “Yes we can!” resonated the main auditorium as her fans stood and applause her.

== Miss World 2010 ==
Areme won the title of Miss Ghana 2009 on September 26, 2009, 2 days before her birthday. After winning this pageant, she represented her country at the 60th Miss World Anniversary which was held in Sanya, China on October 30, 2010. She competed with 114 women from around the world.

Although she did not placed as one of the 25 semifinalists, she made her country proud of her. She did well in some Fast Tracks including placing in the Top 20 on Miss World Beach Beauty and Top Model. She also became the 1st Runner Up of Beauty With A Purpose about children trafficking and the modern slave trade.

I had a great time at Miss World. But the most exciting one was when I mounted the Miss World final stage. Then I remembered how I normally sit close to the TV back home to watch every show at the Miss World finals

== After Miss World ==
After the Miss World 2010 pageant, Areme returned to her native country, Ghana. She continued her study in the field of marketing at Ghana Institute of Management and Public Administration (GIMPA). She also continued her program Beauty With A Purpose by building a charitable organization named "Areme Gives Back". She now works as Emirates cabin crew.
