= Miss World Australia =

Beauty pageant

- Formation: 2002
- Type: Beauty pageant
- Headquarters: Melbourne
- Location: Australia
- Members: Miss World
- Official language: English
- Director LICENCE HOLDER: Deborah Miller
- Website: missworldaustralia.com.au

Miss World Australia is a national beauty pageant that selects Australia's representative to the Miss World pageant since 2002. Two Australian representatives have won the Miss World title in 1968 and 1972.

== History ==
In 2006 the national contest was cancelled and Sabrina Houssami was controversially crowned the winner and placed second runner up at Miss World. In 2012, Jessica Kahawaty also placed second runner up. Australia has been crowned Queen of Oceania each year since 2013. Penelope Plummer became Australia's first Miss World in 1968. Belinda Green became Miss World in 1972. Before the Miss World Australia contest was instituted in 2002, Australian representatives to the international Miss World pageants were chosen from candidates at the Miss Australia pageant.

=== Owners ===
In February 2016, was announced that the pageant has a new owner: Deborah Miller. She was the former Miss Universe Australia owner.

== Titleholders ==
Color keys

- : Declared as Winner
- : Ended as runner-up or top 5/6 qualification
- : Ended as one of the finalists or semifinalists
- : Ended as special awards winner

Year	State	Hometown	Miss World Australia	Placement at Miss World	Special Awards
2002	Queensland	Gold Coast	Nicole Ghazal	Top 10	
2003	South Australia	Adelaide	Olivia Stratton	Top 20	People's Choice Award
2004	New South Wales	Sydney	Sarah Janette Davies	Top 15	Miss Contestant's Choice; 1st Runner-up Miss World Beach Beauty; 1st Runner-up Miss World Sport; Top 20 Miss World Talent
2005	New South Wales	Albury	Dennae Brunow	Unplaced	Miss World Sport
2006	New South Wales	Sydney	Sabrina Houssami	2nd Runner Up	Queen of Asia-Pacific
2007	New South Wales	Sydney	Caroline Pemberton	Unplaced	Top 18 Miss World Talent; Top 21 Miss World Beach Beauty
2008	New South Wales	Albion Park	Katie Richardson	Unplaced	Top 25 Miss World Beach Beauty
2009	New South Wales	Sydney	Sophie Lavers	Unplaced	3rd Runner-up Miss World Talent; Top 12 Miss World Sport
2010	New South Wales	Sydney	Ashleigh Francis	Unplaced	Top 10 Miss World Talent; Top 20 Miss World Beach Beauty; Top 20 Miss World Sport
2011	Victoria	Melbourne	Amber Greasley	Top 31	Top 20 Miss World Top Model; Top 24 Miss World Sport
2012	New South Wales	Sydney	Jessica Kahawaty	2nd Runner Up	1st Runner-up Beauty with a Purpose; 4th Runner-up Miss World Top Model; Top 10 Miss World Beach Beauty; Top 16 Interview; Top 24 Miss World Sport; Top 25 Miss World Talent
2013	Queensland	Cairns	Erin Holland	Top 10	Queen of Oceania; 1st Runner-up Beauty with a Purpose; 1st Runner-up Miss World Talent; Top 11 Interview
2014	Queensland	Brisbane	Courtney Thorpe	Top 5	Queen of Oceania; Top 5 Miss World Top Model; Top 10 People's Choice; Top 10 Interview; Top 23 Beauty with a Purpose; Top 24 Miss World Sport
2015	Queensland	Brisbane	Tess Alexander	Top 11	Queen of Oceania; Top 24 Miss World Sport; Top 13 Miss World Talent; Top 25 Peoples Choice
2016	Queensland	Tully	Madeline Cowe	Top 20	Queen of Oceania; Top 24 Beauty with a Purpose; Top 24 Miss World Sport
2017	Victoria	Melbourne	Esma Voloder	Unplaced	Top 20 Beauty with a Purpose
2018	Victoria	Melbourne	Taylah Cannon	Unplaced	Top 32 Miss World Top Model
2019	New South Wales	Sydney	Sarah Marschke	Top 40	Top 40 at Miss World Top Model; Top 27 Miss World Talent
2020	Due to the impact of COVID-19 pandemic, no pageant in 2020				
2021	Did not compete				
2022	Miss World 2021 was rescheduled to 16 March 2022 due to the COVID-19 pandemic outbreak in Puerto Rico, no edition started in 2022				
2023	Victoria	Melbourne	Kristen Wright	Top 12	Top 32 at Sports Challenge; Top 25 at Head-to-Head Challenge; Queen of Oceania
2024	No competition held				
2025	Queensland	Gold Coast	Jasmine Stringer	Top 20	Top 32 at Sports Challenge; Top 24 at Talent Challenge; Queen of Oceania
2026	South Australia	Adelaide	Olivija Spanovskis	Unplaced	
2027	TBA	TBA	TBA	TBA	

== Australian representatives at Miss World pageant before 2002 ==
Color keys

- : Declared as Winner
- : Ended as runner-up or top 5/6 qualification
- : Ended as one of the finalists or semifinalists
- : Ended as special awards winner

Year	Miss World Australia	Placement at Miss World	Special Awards
1955	Beverly Prowse	Top 8 Semi-finalist	
1957	June Finlayson	Unplaced	
1958	Astrid Tanda Lindholm	Unplaced	
1964	Maria Luyben	Unplaced	
1965	Jan Rennison	Unplaced	
1967	Judy Lockey	Unplaced	
1968	Penelope Plummer	Miss World 1968	
1969	Stefane Meurer		
1970	Valli Kemp	Top 15 Semi-finalist	
1971	Valerie Roberts	Top 15 Semi-finalist	
1972	Belinda Green	Miss World 1972	
1973	Virginia Radinas		
1974	Gail Margaret Petith	3rd Runner-up	
1975	Anne Davidson	Top 15 Semi-finalist	
1976	Karen Jo Pini	1st Runner-up	
1977	Jaye-Leanne Hopewell	Top 7 Finalist	
1978	Denise Ellen Coward	2nd Runner-up	
1979	Jodie Anne Day	3rd Runner-up	
1980	Linda Leigh Shepherd	Unplaced	
1981	Melissa Hannan	Top 7 Finalist	Queen of Oceania
1982	Catherine Anne Morris	Top 15 Semi-finalist	Queen of Oceania
1983	Tanya Bowe	Unplaced	Queen of Oceania
1984	Lou-Anne Caroline Ronchi	2nd Runner-up	Queen of Oceania
1985	Angelina Nasso	Unplaced	
1986	Stephanie Eleanor Andrews	Unplaced	
1987	Donna Thelma Rudrum	Unplaced	
1988	Catherine Bushell	Top 10 Semi-finalist	Queen of Oceania
1989	Natalie McCurry	Top 10 Semi-finalist	Queen of Oceania
1990	Karina Brown	Unplaced	
1991	Leanne Buckle	1st Runner-up	Queen of Asia-Oceania
1992	Rebecca Simic	Unplaced	
1993	Karen Ann Carwin	Unplaced	
1994	Skye Edwards	Unplaced	
1995	Melissa Porter	Top 10 Semi-finalist	
1996	Nicole Smith	Unplaced	
1997	Laura Csortan	Top 10 Semi-finalist	
1998	Sarah Jane St.Clair	Unplaced	
1999	Kathryn Hay	Unplaced	
2000	Renee Henderson	Unplaced	
2001	Eva Milic	Unplaced	

== See also ==
- Miss Australia
- Miss Universe Australia
- Miss International Australia
- Miss Earth Australia
