= Daniella Walcott =

Trinidadian model and artistic painter (born 1991)

- Born: Daniella Walcott; March 13, 1991 (age 35); Port of Spain, Trinidad and Tobago
- Education: University of Trinidad and Tobago
- Occupations: model; painter; entrepreneur
- Height: 176 cm (69 in)
- Beauty pageant titleholder
- Title: Miss Trinidad and Tobago 2016
- Years active: 2007–present
- Hair color: Brown
- Eye color: Hazel Green
- Major competitions: Miss Trinidad and Tobago 2016 (Winner); Miss World 2016 (Unplaced)

Daniella Walcott (born March 13, 1991) is a Trinidadian model, artistic painter and beauty pageant titleholder. She won the 2016 edition of the Miss Trinidad and Tobago beauty pageant and represented Trinidad and Tobago at Miss World 2016.

Wallcott has two younger sisters, Victoria Walcott and Laura Walcott. Her parents are Gregory and Claire Walcott. She is cousins with former Miss Trinidad 2008 Gabrielle Walcott.

== Early life and education ==
Walcott was born in Trinidad but spent her early childhood at Scarborough, Tobago. She studied Theatre Design and Production from the University of Trinidad and Tobago and graduated in November 2017.

== Career ==
She once worked for a Trinidadian insurance company as an assistant project manager before starting as creative manager of LaVida Fashion Boutique in 2012. Her love for painting made her open her own company, Daniella Walcott Creations.

== Pageantry ==
=== Miss Trinidad and Tobago 2016 ===
On April 8, 2016, she won the Miss Trinidad and Tobago 2016 pageantry and was crowned by her predecessor Kimberly Farrah Singh.

Awards and achievements
Preceded by Kimberly Farrah Singh	Miss Trinidad and Tobago; 2016	Succeeded by Chandini Chanka
