= Miss Vietnam World =

Beauty contest for Vietnamese women

Miss Vietnam World (Vietnamese: Hoa hậu Thế giới người Việt) is a beauty contest for both Vietnamese women in Vietnam and Overseas Vietnamese women from other countries in the world. The pageant is related to Miss World Vietnam but not to the Miss Vietnam pageants. The contest was first held in 2007, and the next was held in August 2010.

== Titleholders ==
Year	Miss Vietnam World	First Runner-up	Second Runner-up	Venue	Number of entrants
2012	cancelled				
2010	Luu Thi Diem Huong; Ho Chi Minh City	Nguyễn Ngọc Kiều Khanh; Germany	Phạm Thúy Vy Victoria; United States	Vinpearl Land, Nha Trang, Khánh Hòa	37
2009	cancelled				
2007	Ngo Phuong Lan; Hanoi	Teresa Sam; Great Britain	Đang Minh Thu; Nam Định	Vinpearl Land, Nha Trang, Khánh Hòa	42

See also: Danh sách đại diện của Việt Nam tại các cuộc thi sắc đẹp lớn

== Journey ==
Color keys

- Declared as the winner in an International pageant.
- Ended as Runner-up in an International pageant.
- Ended as finalist or semifinalist in an International pageant.
- Unplaced.

=== Miss Vietnam World 2007 ===
Miss Vietnam World 2007 took place in Vinpearl, Nha Trang on September 2, the Independence day of Vietnam. There were 37 contestants participating in this contest from many countries in the world, including Vietnam, United Kingdom, Switzerland, Germany, Czech Republic, Russia, Ukraine, Bulgaria, Canada and the United States. The final consisted of 4 sections: evening gown, swimsuit, áo dài (the traditional costume of Vietnamese women) and an interview.

==== Placement ====
Final results	Contestant	International pageant	International placement
Miss Vietnam World 2007	Switzerland - Ngo Phuong Lan		
1st Runner-up	Great Britain - Teresa Sam		
2nd Runner-up	(Vietnam) Nam Định - Đang Minh Thu	Miss World 2007	Unplaced
Top 5	(Vietnam) Hanoi - Vu Ngoc Anh; Russia - Natalia Tran		
Top 10	Canada - Le Thi Hong Nhung; Germany - Le Thi Hoa; USA - Nguyen Binh Phuong; (Vietnam) Cà Mau - Phan Nhu Thao; (Vietnam) Cần Thơ - Vo Thi Le Thu		

==== Special awards ====
- Miss Tourism : Nguyen Kang Wung Ching - Germany
- Miss Photogenic : (United States) Nguyen Cao Thu Van - USA
- Best in Evening Gown : (Vietnam) Tran Ngoc Bich - Ho Chi Minh City
- Best in Presentation : (Vietnam) Nguyen Thi Anh Ly - Hanoi
- Best Complexion : (Vietnam) Vu Ngoc Anh - Hanoi
- Miss Beach : Nguyen Thi Van Anh - Ukraine
- Best in Ao dai : (United Kingdom) Anna Hua Ngoc Anh - Great Britain
- Best in Interview : Ngo Phuong Lan - Switzerland

=== Miss Vietnamese World 2009 ===
The second edition of this beauty pageant planned to be held in 2009. It was allowed but then was cancelled due to lack of time for well organising.

=== Miss Vietnamese World 2010 ===
Miss Vietnam World 2010 final took place in Vinpearl Land, Nha Trang from May 20 to August 30. Before that the semi-final with contestants living in Vietnam competed in Ho Chi Minh City and Hanoi, for contestants from in the American region competed in the US, and those from Europe gathered in the UK. Russia host competitors from former Soviet Union countries and South Korea was home for to competitors from Asian countries.

There are some contestants participating in this contest from many countries in the world, including Vietnam, Australia, Belgium, Czech Republic, Germany, Japan, Russia, Sweden, United States. The winner of Miss World Vietnam 2010 - Lưu Thị Diễm Hương - received gifts worth 500 million dong (US$26,500), the highest among beauty contests in Vietnam so far and she represented Vietnam to compete at Miss Earth 2010, which was held in Nha Trang later that year.

Il Divo and several other local stars performed at 2010 Miss World Vietnam.

==== Placement ====
Final results	Contestant	International pageant	International placement
Miss Vietnam World 2010	(Vietnam) Ho Chi Minh City - Lưu Thị Diễm Hương	Miss Earth 2010	Top 14
Miss Vietnam World 2010	(Vietnam) Ho Chi Minh City - Lưu Thị Diễm Hương	Miss Universe 2012	Unplaced
1st Runner-up	Germany - Nguyễn Ngọc Kiều Khanh	Miss World 2010	Unplaced
2nd Runner-up	USA - Phạm Thúy Vy Victoria	Miss World 2011	Unplaced
Top 5	(Vietnam) Thanh Hóa - Phan Thị Lý		
Top 5	(Vietnam) Tiền Giang - Phan Thị Mơ	Miss Earth 2011	Unplaced
Top 5	(Vietnam) Tiền Giang - Phan Thị Mơ	World Miss Tourism Ambassador 2018	Winner
Top 15	(Vietnam) Hanoi - Hạ Thị Hoàng Anh; Czech Republic - Nguyễn Mai Anh		
Top 15	Czech Republic - Daniela Nguyễn Thu Mây	Miss Supranational 2011	3rd Runner-Up
Top 15	(Vietnam) Bắc Kạn - Bùi Thị Thu Hường; Russia - Nguyễn Thanh Huyền; (Vietnam) Hanoi - Nguyễn Phương Mai; (Vietnam) Ho Chi Minh City - Ninh Hoàng Ngân; Australia - Nguyễn Phương Mai; (Vietnam) Lâm Đồng - Nguyễn Thị Thanh Vân; (Vietnam) Ba Ria - Vũng Tàu - Hồ Thị Oanh Yến		

==== Special awards ====
- Miss Congeniality: Vietnam - Ngụy Thanh Lan
- Miss Photogenic: Vietnam - Lưu Thị Diễm Hương
- Best Face: Czech Republic - Daniela Nguyễn Thu Mây
- Miss Elegant: Czech Republic - Nguyễn Mai Anh
- Miss Sport: United States - Phạm Thúy Vy Victoria
- Miss Talent: Russia - Nguyễn Thanh Huyền
- Best in Áo dài: Vietnam - Hạ Thị Hoàng Anh (previously Phạm Thị Thùy Linh but was disqualified because of violating the regulation)
- Miss Fashion: Vietnam - Ninh Hoàng Ngân
- Miss Beach: Germany - Nguyễn Ngọc Kiều Khanh

== Notes ==
- Miss Vietnam World 2007 had the right to represent Vietnam in Miss World 2007 and Miss World 2008, but she declined. Đặng Minh Thu, the 2nd Runner-up, was chosen to replace instead. Thu failed to make the final Top 15 and the crown going to Miss China. In 2008, Dương Trương Thiên Lý, the 2nd Runner-up of Miss Universe Vietnam 2008 also failed to make the semi-finalists.
- In 2010, Miss Vietnam World and Miss Vietnam were held at almost the same time. The winner of Miss Vietnam World, Lưu Thị Diễm Hương, was the Vietnamese representative to Miss Earth 2010 and enter Top 14 while 1st Runner-up Nguyễn Ngọc Kiều Khanh failed to make the cut at Miss World 2010
- In 2011, Daniela Nguyễn Thu Mây (top 15 Miss Vietnam World 2010) was invited to join Miss Supranational 2011 in Poland and she got 3rd runner-up title of the competition while Miss Poland was the winner in her homeland. Besides, 2nd Runner-up Phạm Thúy Vy Victoria represented Vietnam to compete Miss World 2011 in Great Britain in November. Also, Top 5 Miss Vietnam World 2010 - Phan Thị Mơ entered top 10 in 23rd Miss Asia USA, which is held in California, United States and represented Vietnam in Miss Earth 2011 held in Quezon, Philippines. Later, she crowned World Miss Tourism Ambassador 2018.
- In 2012, Lưu Thị Diễm Hương represented Vietnam again at Miss Universe 2012.

== See also ==
- Miss Vietnam
- Miss Universe Vietnam
- Miss World Vietnam
- Miss Supranational Vietnam
- Miss Earth Vietnam
- List of Vietnam representatives at international women beauty pageants
