= Jessica Kahawaty =

Lebanese Australian model (born 1988)

Jessica Kahawaty .
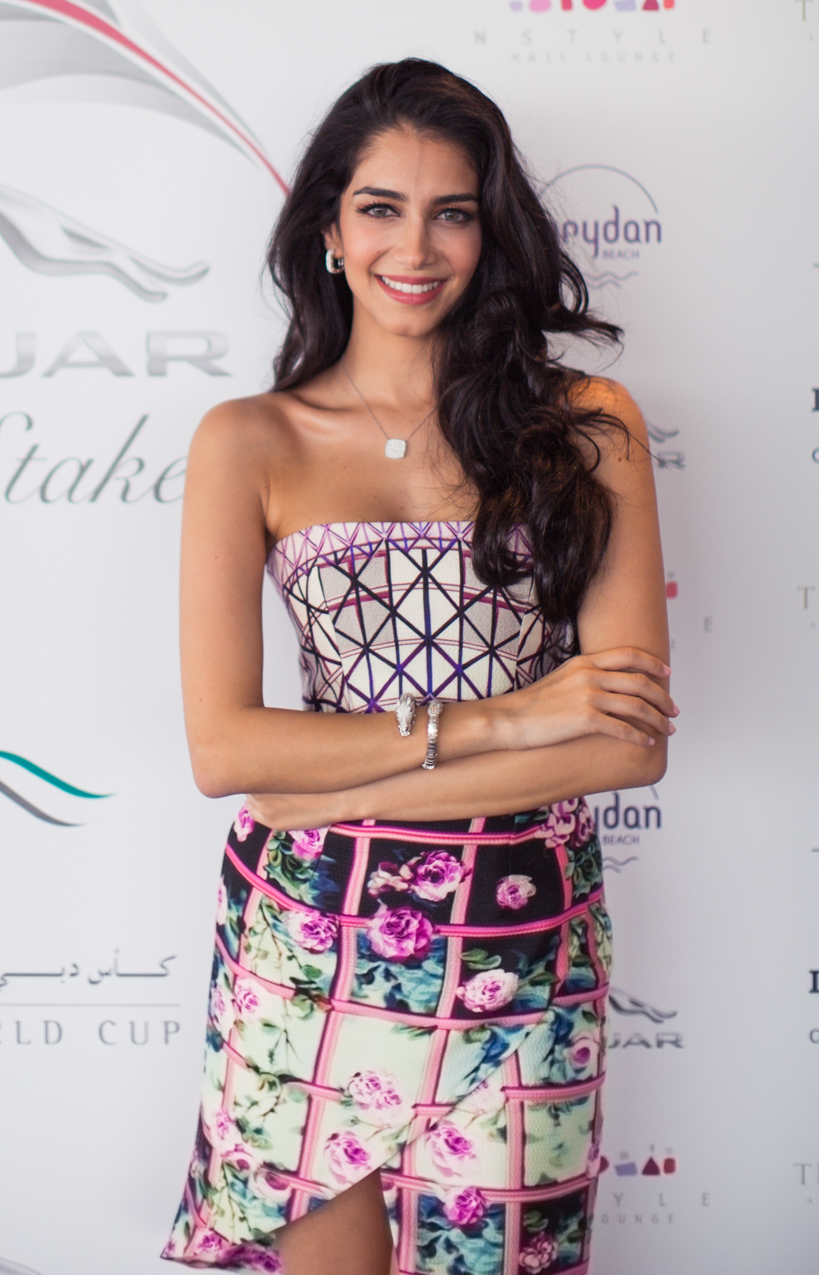
- Jessica Kahawaty in 2014.
- Born: Jessica Michelle Kahawaty; 12 September 1988 (age 38); Sydney, New South Wales, Australia
- Height: 5 ft 9 in (1.75 m)
- Beauty pageant titleholder
- Title: Miss Lebanon Australia 2007; Miss Lebanon Emigrant 2008; Miss Lebanon International 2008; Miss World Australia 2012
- Hair colour: Dark brown
- Eye colour: Dark brown
- Major competitions: Miss Lebanon Australia 2007 (Winner); Miss Lebanon Emigrant 2008 (Winner); Miss Lebanon International 2008 (Winner); Miss International 2008 (Top 12); Miss Lebanon 2010 (3rd Runner-Up); Miss World Australia 2012 (Winner); Miss World 2012 (2nd Runner-Up)

Jessica Michelle Kahawaty (Arabic: جيسيكا ميشيل قهواتي; born 12 September 1988 in Sydney, New South Wales) is a Lebanese Australian model and beauty pageant titleholder who won Miss World Australia 2012 and represented Australia at Miss World 2012 in Ordos City, Inner Mongolia, China where she placed second runner-up to the ultimate winner, Yu Wenxia of China.

== Career ==
Kahawaty was born in Sydney, Australia to a Syrian-Armenian father and a Lebanese mother. She studied law. She competed in Miss Lebanon 2010 held at the LBC studios in Adma, Lebanon, where she was rewarded the position of third runner-up.

Kahawaty won her first beauty pageant at the age of 17 years in Sydney in May 2007. She was crowned Miss Lebanon Australia 2007 and was the first Lebanese Australian to subsequently win Miss Lebanon World 2008 in the following year. The pageant, held in Batroun Village Club, Lebanon, on 14 August 2008 featured 31 contestants of Lebanese origin from around the world. In November, she represented Lebanon in Miss International 2008, where she placed in the Top 12.

== Honours ==
=== Domestic beauty pageants ===
- Miss World Australia 2012: Winner
- Miss Lebanon 2010: 3rd Runner-Up
- Miss Lebanon Australia 2007: Winner

=== International beauty pageants ===
- Miss World 2012: 2nd Runner-Up (representing Australia)
- Miss International 2008: Top 12 (representing Lebanon)
- Miss Lebanon Emigrant 2008: Winner (representing Australia)

Awards and achievements
Preceded by (Puerto Rico) Amanda Vilanova	Miss World 2nd Runner-Up; 2012	Succeeded by (Ghana) Carranzar Shooter
Preceded by Amber Greasley	Miss World Australia; 2012	Succeeded by Erin Holland
Preceded by Grace Bejjani	Miss Lebanon International; 2008	Succeeded by Sarah Barbosa Mansour
