= Alexandra Liao =

Peruvian model and beauty pageant

- Born: Alexandra Liao; 1989 (age 36–37); Lima, Peru
- Height: 1.78 m (5 ft 10 in)
- Beauty pageant titleholder
- Title: Miss Lima 2010; Miss Peru Mundo 2010
- Hair color: light brown
- Eye color: light brown

Alexandra Liao (born 1989) is a Peruvian model and beauty pageant titleholder who won the Miss Perú 2010 pageant on May 22, 2010. Liao also won the "Miss Personal Training" and "Best Hair" awards. She represented Peru at Miss World 2010 and at the Reina Hispanoamericana 2010 pageant.

Preceded by Claudia Carrasco	Miss World Peru; 2010	Succeeded by

Preceded by Karol Castillo	Reina Hispanoamericana Peru; 2010	Succeeded by
