= Snežana Prorok =

Bosnian model

- Born: Snežana Prorok; 1994 (age 31–32); Istočna Ilidža, Istočno Sarajevo, Bosnia and Herzegovina
- Height: 5 ft 8.5 in (1.74 m)
- Beauty pageant titleholder
- Title: Miss Bosne i Hercegovine 2010; Miss Republika Srpska 2010
- Hair color: blond
- Eye color: blue
- Major competition: Miss World 2010 (Unplaced)

Snežana Prorok (Serbian Cyrillic: Снежана Пророк; born 1994) is a Bosnian model and beauty pageant titleholder who won Miss Bosne i Hercegovine 2010 and previously won title Miss Republika Srpska 2010.
