= Carranzar Naa Okailey Shooter =

Ghanaian model and beauty queen

- Born: August 6, 1989 (age 37)
- Education: University of Ghana
- Height: 175
- Beauty pageant titleholder
- Title: Miss Ghana 2012; Miss World Africa 2013
- Hair color: Black
- Eye color: Black
- Major competitions: Miss Ghana 2012 (winner); Miss World 2013 (2nd Runner-Up)

Carranzar Naa Okailey Shooter (born August 6, 1989) is the Ghanaian model and beauty pageant titleholder who won Miss Ghana 2012. She represented Ghana and placed 2nd runner-up at Miss World 2013 pageant in Indonesia. Her placement marked Ghana's highest placement as of now.

== Miss Ghana pageant controversy ==
Ghanaian actress Yvonne Okoro, whose sister Roseline Okoro competed in the 2012 pageant, accused the organizers of the pageant of vote-rigging in favor of Shooter.

== Pageantry ==
Miss World 2013 Awards
Beauty with a Purpose (finalist)
Beach Fashion (2nd Runner-Up)

AWARDS AND TITLES:

Miss World 2nd Runner-Up:

Preceded by: 🇦🇺 Jessica Kahawaty

Succeeded by: 🇺🇸 Elizabeth Safrit

Miss World Africa:

Preceded by: 🇸🇸 Atong Dematch

Succeeded by: 🇿🇦 Rolene Strauss
