= Miss Perú 2010 =

- Date: May 22, 2010
- Presenters: Jorge Beleván & Mónica Chacón
- Venue: Parque de la Amistad, Lima, Peru
- Broadcaster: Panamericana Televisión
- Entrants: 22
- Placements: 12
- Withdrawals: Moquegua
- Winner: Giuliana Zevallos; Loreto

Miss Perú 2010, the 58th Miss Perú pageant was held at the on May 22, 2010. That year, 22 candidates were competing for the national crown. The chosen winners represented Peru at the Miss Universe 2010 and Miss World 2010. The rest of the finalists would enter in different pageants.

== Placements ==
Final Results	Contestant
Miss Peru Universe 2010	Loreto - Giuliana Zevallos
Miss World Perú 2010	Region Lima - Alexandra Liao
Miss Supranacional Peru 2010	Ucayali - Claudia Villafuerte
1st Runner-up	Lambayeque - Elizabeth Aedo
2nd Runner-Up	Pasco - Sofía Rivera
3rd Runner-up	La Libertad - Cinthia Risco
Top 12	Tacna - Miluska Lucero; Trujillo - Estefani Mauricci; Ica - Pamella Crovetto; Callao - Gretel Montero; Piura - Nathali Díaz; Arequipa - Yanella Aguilar

== Special awards ==
- Best Regional Costume - Ayacucho - Emma Machado
- Miss Photogenic - Trujillo - Estefani Mauricci
- Miss Elegance - Loreto - Giuliana Zevallos
- Miss Body - Pasco - Sofía Rivera
- Best Hair - Region Lima - Alexandra Liao
- Miss Congeniality - Piura - Nathali Díaz
- Most Beautiful Face - Ucayali - Claudia Villafuerte
- Best Smile - Cajamarca - Karla Chávez
- Miss Internet - Lambayeque - Elizabeth Aedo
- Miss Talent Show - Lambayeque - Elizabeth Aedo

== Delegates ==
- Amazonas - Ivvy Zea
- Áncash - Jimena Salas
- Arequipa - Yanella Aguilar
- Ayacucho - Emma Machado
- Cajamarca - Karla Chávez
- Callao - Gretel Montero
- Cuzco - Jasseth Aguinaga
- Ica - Pamela Crovetto
- Junín - Alexandra Hidalgo
- La Libertad - Cinthia Risco
- Lambayeque - Elizabeth Aedo
- Loreto - Giuliana Zevallos
- Madre de Dios - Debby López
- Pasco - Sofía Rivera
- Piura - Nathali Díaz
- Region Lima - Alexandra Liao
- San Martín - Gina Grandez
- Tacna - Miluzka Lucero
- Trujillo - Estefani Mauricci
- Tumbes - María Jose Martínez
- Ucayali - Claudia Villafuerte

== Trivia ==
- Miss Moquegua, Estefani Carpio, withdrew Miss Peru 2010 pageant, (a few days after the Presentation press Conference) for some disagreements with the national director.

== Judges ==
- Dr. Walter Cruzálegui - Plastic Surgeon
- Claudia Ortiz de Zevallos - Miss Perú 2003
- Dr. Álex Tena - Dental Specialist
- Luis Roy - General Manager of Personal Training Gym
- Marynes Mendoza- Mrs. Venezuela International 2009
- Juan Manuel del Mar - Mayor of Santiago de Surco District
- Mariana Larrabure - Miss World Peru 1998
- Desiree Soto - Marketing Manager of Exclusiva
- Gracia Adrianzén - General Manager of Carolina Latina
- Víctor Hugo Montalvo - General Manager of Montalvo Spa
- Heidi Castrillón - Manager of BIZ USA PERU Magazine
- Gian Carlo Miranda - General Manager of PRIVEE Magazine
- Fiorella Añaños - Manager of La Naranja Media e Interacción Móvil

.

== Background Music ==
- Opening Show – West End & Sybil - "The Love I Lost"
- Swimsuit Competition – Destination - Move On Up
- Evening Gown Competition – Sarah Brightman & Steve Harley "The Phantom of the Opera"
