= Caroline Pemberton =

Australian beauty pageant contestant

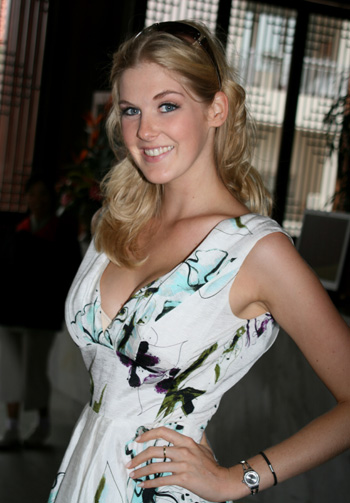
- Caroline Pemberton, 2007
- Born: Sydney, Australia
- Beauty pageant titleholder
- Title: Miss Australia 2007
- Relatives: Rex Pemberton (brother)
- Website: http://carolinepemberton.com/

Caroline Pemberton is an Australian model and beauty pageant titleholder who was crowned Miss World Australia 2007 and represented her country at Miss World 2007 but Unplaced.

== Career ==
Pemberton was won the 2007 Miss Australia at Star City, Sydney on 4 April 2007. She went on to contest the Miss World title on 1 December 2007 in Sanya, China.

She was subsequently appointed as a Goodwill Ambassador for UNICEF, ambassador for the Sir David Martin Foundation, the Novus Foundation and joined the board of the Kokoda Trust.

Pemberton has also worked as a television presenter, and has produced content for companies including Red Bull, Outside TV, and the travel program Getaway.

Pemberton's hobbies include paragliding, surfing, boxing, canyoning, mountain biking, diving, skiing and mountaineering. She co-founded the Australian Women's Adventure Alliance, and campaigns under her MissAdventure brand to promote action sports and outdoor activities to girls and young women.

== Personal life ==
She is the sister of Rex Pemberton, the youngest Australian to climb Mount Everest and the Seven Summits.

Preceded by Sabrina Houssami	Miss World Australia; 2007	Succeeded by Katie Richardson
