= Miss Kyrgyzstan =

Beauty pageant

Miss Kyrgyzstan Organization Мисс Кыргызстан
- Formation: 2009; 17 years ago
- Type: Beauty pageant
- Headquarters: Bishkek
- Location: Kyrgyzstan
- Members: Miss Universe; Miss World; Miss International; Miss Earth
- Official language: Kyrgyz
- Staff: 40

Miss Kyrgyzstan is a national beauty pageant in Kyrgyzstan. The pageant was founded in 2009, where the winners were sent to Miss Universe, Miss World, Miss International and Miss Earth.

== History ==
The Miss Kyrgyzstan debuted in 2011 under the Directorate of the National Competition, Interalliance KG LLC. The committee organized the contest Miss Kyrgyzstan 2011 with the support of the Ministry of Culture and Information of Kyrgyz Republic, at the Theater of Opera and Ballet, Bishkek, on March 12, 2011. Deputy Minister of Culture and Information of Kyrgyz Republic, Mr. Kuluev was invited to award the certificate of Miss Kyrgyzstan title and crown Miss Kyrgyzstan 2011 at the stage. The competition was won by a 24-year-old resident of Bishkek, Nurzhanova Nazira. She was the first delegate from Kyrgyzstan to Miss World. Asel Samakova was chosen to represent Kyrgyzstan in Miss International 2011.

=== Miss Universe Kyrgyzstan ===
In 2017, Miss Kyrgyzstan was organized by Interalliance KG LLC, and the title of Miss Kyrgyzstan – 2017 was by Begimay Karybekova. She expected to be at Miss World competition but, she did not compete and was allocated to Miss Universe. She represented the country in Miss Universe 2018.

In 2020, Miss Kyrgyzstan's title had gone to Ms. Lazat Nurkozhoeva. The Miss Kyrgyzstan 2020 was organized by Interalliance KG jointly with R-Style - Beauty Company of Kyrgyzstan, the event took place at the Ala-Too Hall on December 29. As a prize, Nurkozhoeva received a BMW X5 car. Lazat withdrew from Miss Universe 2021 after Israel hosted the pageant.

Began in 2022 the Miss Kyrgyzstan Organization is the official national pageant in Kyrgyzstan that has a right to send a delegate to Miss Universe (single license).

Miss Kyrgyzstan 2023 made history as the edition with 3 winners with the same crown, the same title, and the same sash. 3 winners are expected to go to Miss Universe 2023, Miss Universe 2024, and Miss Earth 2024.

== Titleholders ==
The following is a list of winners for International pageants. From 2011 to present..

Miss Universe Kyrgyzstan
Miss World Kyrgyzstan
Miss International Kyrgyzstan
Miss Earth Kyrgyzstan
Miss Grand Kyrgyzstan

Year	Miss Kyrgyzstan	Kyrgyz Name	Region
2011	Nazira Nurzhanova	Назира Нуржанова	Bishkek
2012	Diana Оvganova	Диана Овганова	Batken
2013	Zhibek Nukeeva	Жибек Нукеева	Talas
2014	Aykol Alikjanovna	Айкөл Аликжанова	Jalal-Abad
2015	Tattybubu Samidin Kyzy	Таттыбүбү Самидин кызы	Osh
2016	Perizat Rasulbek Kyzy	Перизат Расулбек кызы	Osh
2017	Begimay Karybekova	Бегимай Карыбекова	Naryn
2018	Elmara Buranbaeva	Элмара Буранбаева	Jalal-Abad
2019	Aizhan Chanacheva	Айжан Чаначева	Issyk-Kul
2020	Lazat Nurkozhoeva	Лазат Нуркожоева	Bishkek
2021	Altynai Botoyarova	Алтынай Ботоярова	Bishkek
2022	Diami Almazbekova	Дями Алмазбекова	Bishkek

Year	Miss Kyrgyzstan	Kyrgyz Name	Region	Miss Universe Kyrgyzstan	Kyrgyz Name	Region	Miss Earth Kyrgyzstan	Kyrgyz Name	Region
2023	Akylai Kalberdieva	Акылай Калбердиева	Bishkek	Maya Turdalieva	Майя Турдалиева	Bishkek	Aiperi Keneshbekova	Айпери Кеңешбекова	Bishkek
Year	Miss Kyrgyzstan	Kyrgyz Name	Region	Miss World Kyrgyzstan	Kyrgyz Name	Region	Miss International Kyrgyzstan	Kyrgyz Name	Region
2024	Mary Kuvakova	Мери Кувакова	Bishkek	Ariet Sanzharova	Ариет Санжарова	Bishkek	Aiperi Nurbekova	Айпери Нурбекова	Bishkek

Year	Miss Kyrgyzstan	Kyrgyz Name	Region	Miss International Kyrgyzstan	Kyrgyz Name	Region	Miss Grand Kyrgyzstan	Kyrgyz Name	Region	Miss Kyrgyzstan (Tourism Ambassador)	Kyrgyz Name	Region
2025	Anara Esengeldieva	Анара Эсенгелдиева	Bishkek	Suzanna Umetova	Сюзанна Уметова	Bishkek	Medina Ermekova	Медина Эрмекова	Bishkek	Rasul Kyzy Ayana	Расул кызы Аяна	Bishkek

== Titleholders under Miss Kyrgyzstan Org. ==
=== Miss Universe Kyrgyzstan ===
- : Declared as Winner
- : Ended as runner-up or top 5/6 qualification
- : Ended as one of the finalists or semi-finalists
- : Ended as special awards winner

Year	Region	Miss Kyrgyzstan	Kyrgyz Name	Placement at MU	Special Awards	Notes
Ryskul Namazbekova (R Event) directorship — a franchise holder to Miss Universe from 2021
2026	Bishkek	Medina Ermekova	Медина Эрмекова	TBA	TBA	
2025	Bishkek	Mary Kuvakova	Мери Кувакова	Unplaced		
2024	Chüy	Maya Turdalieva	Майя Турдалиева	Unplaced		
2023	Chüy	Akylai Kalberdieva	Акылай Калбердиева	Did not compete		Kalberdieva withdrew for unknown reasons.
2023	Chüy	Diami Almazbekova	Дями Алмазбекова	Did not compete		Almazbekova decided to withdraw due to lack of sponsorship.
2022	Chüy	Altynai Botoyarova	Алтынай Ботоярова	Unplaced		
2021	Chüy	Lazat Nurkozhoeva	Лазат Нуркожоева	Did not compete		Miss Universe 2021 was hosted in Israel, due to the negative diplomatic relations between the two countries, Kyrgyzstan made the decision to withdraw from the competition.
Animesh Baruah (Interalliance Kg LLC) directorship — a franchise holder to Miss Universe between 2018―2019
2020	Naryn	Aizhan Chanacheva	Айжан Чаначева	Did not compete due to the impact of COVID-19 pandemic		
2019	Jalal-Abad	Elmara Buranbaeva	Элмара Буранбаева	Did not compete		Kyrgyzstan did not send a delegate to the Miss Universe pageant due to the lack of financial support.
2018	Naryn	Begimay Karybekova	Бегимай Карыбекова	Unplaced		Karybekova was initially scheduled for Miss World 2017 since she was crowned "Miss World Kyrgyzstan" in the final, but she did not compete at the competition. However, 1 year later she decided to compete at Miss Universe. In 2018 Kyrgyzstan made its debut at Miss Universe pageant.

=== Miss World Kyrgyzstan ===
- : Declared as Winner
- : Ended as runner-up or top 5/6 qualification
- : Ended as one of the finalists or semi-finalists
- : Ended as special awards winner

The Miss Kyrgyzstan Organization decided to withdraw from Miss World in 2017. In 2019, the representative of Kyrgyzstan was coming from the Miss World Kyrgyzstan agency. Since 2024, The Miss Kyrgyzstan Organization got back the Miss World license.

Year	Region	Miss World Kyrgyzstan	Kyrgyz Name	Placement at MW	Special Awards	Notes
Ryskul Namazbekova (R Event) directorship — a franchise holder to Miss World from 2025
2026	TBA	Saadat Asylbekova	Саадат Асылбекова	TBA		
2025	Issyk-Kul	Aizhan Chanacheva	Айжан Чаначева	Unplaced		
2025	Bishkek	Ariet Sanzharova	Ариет Санжарова	Did not compete		
2024	No competition held					
2023	Did not compete					
2022	Miss World 2021 was rescheduled to 16 March 2022 due to the COVID-19 pandemic outbreak in Puerto Rico, no edition started in 2022					
Animesh Baruah (Interalliance Kg LLC) directorship — a franchise holder to Miss Universe between 2018―2021
2021	Osh	Alina Omorova	Алина Оморова	Did not compete		
2020	Due to the impact of COVID-19 pandemic, no competition held					
2019	Bishkek	Ekaterina Zabolotnova	Екатерина Заболотнова	Unplaced		
2019	Naryn	Aizhan Chanacheva	Айжан Чаначева	Did not compete		
2018	Did not compete					
2017	Naryn	Begimay Karybekova	Бегимай Карыбекова	Did not compete		
2016	Osh	Perizat Rasulbek Kyzy	Перизат Расулбек кызы	Unplaced		
2015	Osh	Tattybubu Samidin Kyzy	Таттыбүбү кызы	Unplaced		
2014	Jalal-Abad	Aykol Alykzhanova	Айкөл Аликжанова	Unplaced		
2013	Talas	Zhibek Nukeeva	Жибек Нукеева	Unplaced	Miss World People's Choice (Top 20)	
2012	Did not compete					
2011	Bishkek	Nazira Nurzhanova	Назира Нуржанова	Unplaced		

=== Miss International Kyrgyzstan ===
- : Declared as Winner
- : Ended as runner-up or top 5/6 qualification
- : Ended as one of the finalists or semi-finalists
- : Ended as special awards winner

Year	Region	Miss International Kyrgyzstan	Kyrgyz Name	Placement at MI	Special Awards	Notes
Ryskul Namazbekova (R Event) directorship — a franchise holder to Miss International from 2024
2027	Bishkek	Ademi Razabekova	TBA	TBA		
2026	Bishkek	Suzanna Umetova	Сюзанна Уметова	TBA		
2025	Did not compete					
2024	Bishkek	Aiperi Nurbekova	Айпери Нурбекова	Unplaced	Best National Costume (Top 10)	Nurbekova was initially scheduled for Miss Earth 2024 since she was crowned "Miss Earth Kyrgyzstan" in the final, but she did not compete at the competition. However, she decided to compete at Miss International 2024.
Did not compete between 2014—2023
Animesh Baruah (Interalliance Kg LLC) directorship — a franchise holder to Miss International between 2009―2013
2013	Bishkek	Meerim Erkinbaeva	Мээрим Эркинбаева	Unplaced		
2012	Did not compete					
2011	Bishkek	Asel Samakova	Асель Самакова	Unplaced		
2010	Did not compete					
2009	Bishkek	Altynai Ismankulova	Алтынай Исманкулова	Unplaced		

=== Miss Earth Kyrgyzstan ===
- : Declared as Winner
- : Ended as runner-up or top 5/6 qualification
- : Ended as one of the finalists or semi-finalists
- : Ended as special awards winner

Year	Region	Miss Earth Kyrgyzstan	Kyrgyz Name	Placement at ME	Special Awards	Notes
Ryskul Namazbekova (R Event) directorship — a franchise holder to Miss Earth from 2023
2024	Bishkek	Aiperi Nurbekova	Айпери Нурбекова	Did not compete		
2023	Bishkek	Aiperi Keneshbekova	Айпери Кеңешбекова	Did not compete		
Animesh Baruah (Interalliance Kg LLC) directorship — a franchise holder to Miss Earth between 2016―2022
2022	Naryn	Aizhan Chanacheva	Айжан Чаначева	Unplaced	Miss Congeniality	After withdrawing from Miss World 2019, Aizhan decided to compete at Miss Earth 3 years later.
2021	Bishkek	Ekaterina Zabolotnova	Екатерина Заболотнова	Unplaced		
Did not compete between 2018—2020
2017	Bishkek	Begimai Nazarova	Бегимай Назарова	Unplaced		
2016	Bishkek	Begim Almasbekova	Бегим Алмасбекова	Unplaced	Best National Costume	
