= Nguyễn Ngọc Kiều Khanh =

- Born: Nguyễn Ngọc Kiều Khanh; 1992 (age 33–34); Schwerin, Germany
- Height: 1.78 m (5 ft 10 in)
- Beauty pageant titleholder
- Title: Miss Vietnam Europe 2009
- Hair color: Black
- Eye color: Brown
- Major competitions: Miss Vietnam World 2010 (1st Runner-up); Miss World 2010 (Unplaced)

Nguyễn Ngọc Kiều Khanh is a Vietnamese-German actress, model and beauty pageant titleholder. Kiều Khanh was born 1992 in Schwerin, Germany, and is of Vietnamese descent. She also holds Vietnamese citizenship. Khanh is the first runner-up of Miss Vietnam World 2010 pageant in Nha Trang, Vietnam. She is the official representative of Vietnam in the Miss World 2010 pageant in Sanya, China.

Khanh has been named as the representative of Vietnam to the Miss World 2010 pageant.

Awards and achievements
Preceded by Trần Thị Hương Giang	Miss World Vietnam; 2010	Succeeded by Vicoria Phạm Thúy Vy
