= Miss Trinidad and Tobago =

Beauty pageant

- Formation: 1954
- Type: Beauty pageant
- Headquarters: Port of Spain
- Location: Trinidad and Tobago
- Members: Miss World
- Official language: English
- Organization: Miss Trinidad & Tobago
- Key people: Peter Elias, Charu Lochan Dass, E.N.R Mohammed
- Website: www.ttmissworld.com

Miss Trinidad and Tobago is a national beauty pageant that has been held annually since 1954. The contest is meant to select a suitable delegate from the twin island republic, to compete in the Miss World pageant. The nation has one Miss World, Miss World 1986, Giselle Laronde.

== History ==
Miss Trinidad and Tobago registered trademark started in 1954 exclusively for Miss World. The first Miss Trinidad and Tobago contest started in 1954 where the eventual winner, Seeta Indranie Mahabir represented the British Commonwealth country at the fourth edition of the contest. Trinidad and Tobago have never withdrawn from the Miss World contest since the 70s. It is the only international contest (Miss World) that they have been consistent in sending a representative to. The Miss World brand is the most established pageant brand in the country. According to Google trends, T&T is ranked 4th as per most searches for Miss World. The British High Commissioner in Trinidad and Tobago (1950s to 1970s) were responsible for sending Miss Trinidad and Tobago winner to Miss World. Then in 1979, they gave the rights to local socialite and businesswoman, Kim Sabeeny. Kim Sabeeny died in 1999. Peter Elias then took over the franchise with Trinidad and Tobago first Miss World, Giselle Laronde. Peter Elias resigned after Gabrielle Walcott placed 2nd runner-up at the 58th edition of the Miss World contest. He gave the directorship to Micheal Raghunanan and Daniel Seebaran in 2009. In 2013, Athaliah Samuel held the franchise and there was a dispute between the franchise holder and the then-titleholder, Shereece Villafana, who was then stripped of her title by the national franchise holder after competing in Miss World. In 2014, Vanessa Manoo and Nicaraguan Businessman, Gregory Lewin took over the company for the next three years. The current directors of Miss T&T Company are Charu Lochan Dass under the tutelage of Brian Gopaul and Dr. Reiaz Mohammed (Vice National Director) who took over the organisation for Miss Trinidad and Tobago in 2018.

== Official broadcaster ==
- TTT, 1962 - 2004
- Television 4 (TV4), 2005
- CTV, 2006 – 2012
- CNC3, 2013 – present

== Team Members ==
The Miss World Trinidad and Tobago Board of Directors for 2018 are:

- Brian Gopaul - National Franchise Holder
- Charu Lochan Dass - National Director
- Dr. Reiaz Mohammed - Co National Pageant Director
- Sheree Ann Ramsingh - Chief Operating Officer
- Jevon King - Dep. Chief Operating Officer
- Peter Sheppard - Art, History, & Culture Director
- Richard Ahong - Producer
- Vaughnette Bigford - Fashion & Entertainment Director
- Kavita Maharaj (Genie) - Photography / Social Media Manager
- Kiran Maharaj - Digital Media Manager

== Titleholders ==
The winner of Miss Trinidad and Tobago national pageant represents Trinidad and Tobago at Miss World.

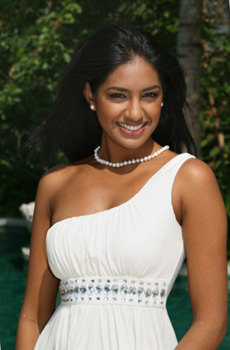
Valene Maharaj during Miss World 2007

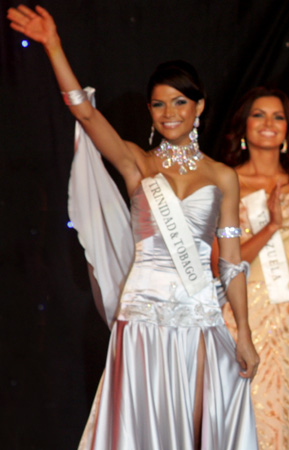
Gabrielle Walcott during Miss World 2008

Color key

- Winner
- Runner-up
- Finalist or semifinalist

Year	Miss Trinidad and Tobago	Placement	Special Awards
1954	Seeta Indranie Mahabir	Unplaced	
1966	Diane DeFreitas	Unplaced	
1971	Maria Jordan	Unplaced	
1975	Donna Sandra Dalrymple	Unplaced	
1976	Patricia Anderson Leon	Top 15	
1977	Marlene Villafana	Unplaced	
1978	Kathleen Thomas	Unplaced	
1979	Marlene Coggins	Top 15	
1980	Maria Octavia Chung	Unplaced	
1981	Rachel Ann Thomas	Top 15	
1982	Althea Ingrid Rocke	4th Runner-up	
1983	Esther Juliette Farmer	Unplaced	
1984	Ria Judy Joanne Rambardan	Unplaced	
1985	Ulrica Christina Phillip	Unplaced	
1986	Giselle Laronde	Miss World 1986	Miss World Americas
1987	Maria del Valle Xavier	Unplaced	
1988	Wendy Baptiste	Unplaced	
1989	Samantha Bhagan	Unplaced	
1990	Guenevere Helen Kelshall	Unplaced	
1991	Sastee Bachan	Unplaced	
1992	Renee Garib	Unplaced	
1993	Denyse Michelle Paul	Unplaced	
1994	Anabel Thomas	Unplaced	
1995	Michelle Khan	2nd Runner-up	Miss World Caribbean
1996	Sharda Ramlogan	Unplaced	
1997	Mandy Jagdeo	Unplaced	
1998	Jeanette Marie La Caillie	Unplaced	
1999	Sacha Anton	Unplaced	
2000	Rhonda Rosemin	Unplaced	
2001	Sacha St. Hill	Unplaced	
2002	Janelle Rajnauth	Unplaced	
2003	Magdalene Walcott	Top 20	
2004	Kenisha Thom	Top 15	
2005	Jenna Marie Andre		
2006	Tineke De Freitas		
2007	Valene Maharaj	3rd Runner-up	Miss World Caribbean
2008	Gabrielle Walcott	2nd Runner-up	Miss World Caribbean; Beauty with a Purpose (Winner)
2009	Ashanna Arthur		Miss World Sport (Top 6)
2010	Davia Chambers		Miss World Beach Beauty (Top 20)
2011	Lee-Ann Forbes	Top 25	Miss World Sport (Top 24); Beauty with a Purpose (Top 77)
2012	Athaliah Samuel		Miss World Top Model (Top 20); Miss World Beach Beauty (Top 20)
2013	Sherrece Villafana		Miss World Talent (Top 10)
2014	Sarah Jane Waddell	Top 25	Best in Interviews (Top 15); Beauty with a Purpose (Top 20); Miss World Sport (Top 20)
2015	Kimberly Farrah Singh		
2016	Daniella Walcott		Beauty with a Purpose (Top 24)
2017	Chandini Chanka		Miss World Talent (Top 20)
2018	Ysabel Bisnath		Beauty with a Purpose (Top 10); Head-to-Head Challenge (Top 20)
2019	Tya Jané Ramey	Top 40	Miss World Caribbean; Head-to-Head Challenge (Winner); Miss World Sport (2nd Runner-up); Miss World Top Model (Top 10); Beauty with a Purpose (Top 20)
2020	Due to the impact of COVID-19 pandemic, no pageant in 2020		
2021	Jeanine Brandt	Top 40	Head-to-Head Challenge (Round 2); Beauty with a Purpose (Top 20); Multimedia (Top 15)
2022	No pageant in 2022		
2023	Aché Abrahams	2nd Runner-up	Miss World Caribbean; Beauty with a Purpose (Top 10); Miss World Top Model (Top 10); Miss World Talent (Top 23); Head-to-Head Challenge (Top 25)
2024	No pageant in 2024		
2025	Anna-Lise Nanton	Top 40	Miss World Talent (Top 24); Miss World Sport (3rd runner-up); Head-to-Head Challenge
2026	Georgia-Lee Gill	Top 40	
2027	Ysabella Thomas	TBA	

=== Miss Asia Pacific World ===
Year	Miss Asia Pacific Trinidad and Tobago	Placement	Special Awards
2013	Dr Greer Anjelica Iton	Top 10	
2014	Tiffany Haunte	Top 3	

=== Best Model of the Universe ===
Year	Best Model of the Universe Trinidad and Tobago	Placement	Special Awards
2013	Soowan Bramble	Best Model of the Universe 2013	Best National Costume; Best Catwalk; Best Body; Miss Photogenic
