= Ashleigh Francis =

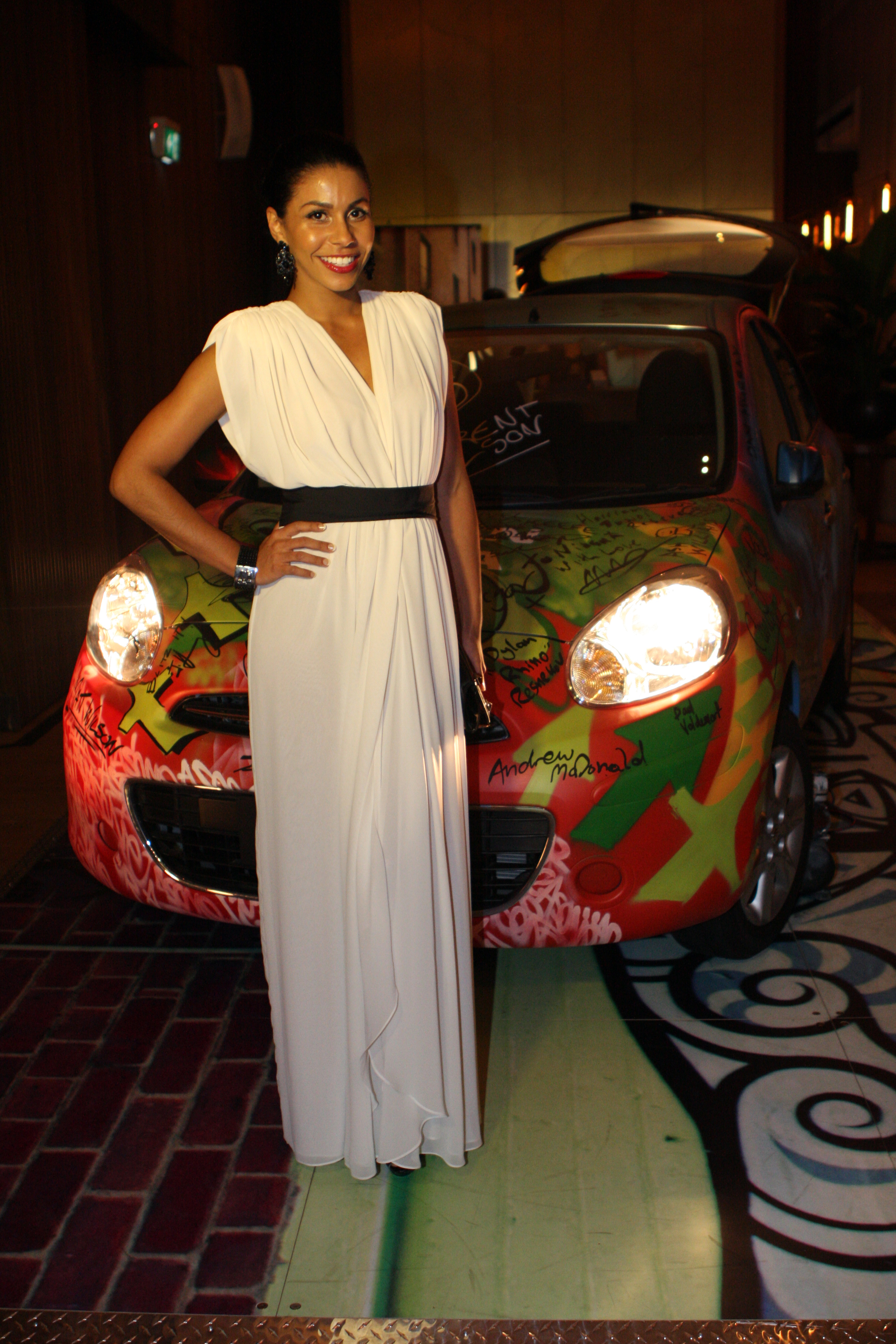
Ashleigh Francis with a colored Nissan Micra, 2011

Ashleigh Carmen Francis (born 12 May 1988) is an Australian TV host, model and beauty pageant titleholder. She won the title of Miss World Australia 2010 and represented her country at Miss World 2010 but unplaced.

She is of Australian, Scottish and Jamaican descent. She is 173 cm (5 ft 8 in) tall.

In Miss World 2010, Francis placed in the finals for Beach Beauty, Sport and Talent (top 10).

In 2012, Francis was signed with G02, a travel show on Australia's SBS network which was due to air in 2013. Six episodes were shot and aired prior to the show being discontinued. During this time she was a featured guest on Please marry my boy and was also asked to be a guest in Australia's Big Brother and I’m a celebrity, get me out of here (UK version) which she was unable to commit to for unknown reasons.

Prior to Francis's involvement with Go2, she was involved with programmes such as FTV Australia (FashionTV), Unseentv, where she covered sporting and red carpet events.

Francis's previous ambassadorships and affiliates include:

- Lemon Detox – full campaign
- Face of Botani Skincare
- Florence and Ferrari cosmetics
- Skywalk (centre point tower) and Flowoxygen.

She has been involved in charities and fundraising events with Gloria Jean's - Cappuccino for a cause Fujitsu Charity Golf Channel Nine's – Sydney Children's Hospital Telethon McHappy Day 2010 and 2011 R U OK? Day, Day of Difference - Shen Yun Chinese Performing Arts Schizophrenia Research Institute and Swear Stop Week. She continues being involved with various charities throughout the world.

== See also ==
- Miss International Australia
- Miss Australia
- Miss World Australia
