= Zhibek Nukeeva =

Kyrgyz model (1995–2017)

- Жибек Нукеева
- Nukeeva after being crowned Miss Kyrgyzstan 2013 in Bishkek
- Born: 27 February 1995; Bishkek, Kyrgyzstan
- Died: 16 July 2017 (aged 22); Istanbul, Turkey
- Occupations: Model; beauty pageant titleholder
- Height: 1.78 m (5 ft 10 in)
- Children: 1
- Beauty pageant titleholder
- Title: Miss Kyrgyzstan 2013
- Hair color: Black
- Eye color: Brown
- Major competitions: Miss Kyrgyzstan 2013 (Winner); Miss World 2013 (Unplaced)

Zhibek Nukeeva (Kyrgyz: Жибек Нукеева; 27 February 1995 – 16 July 2017) was a Kyrgyz model and beauty pageant titleholder who was crowned Miss Kyrgyzstan 2013.

== Early life ==
Nukeeva was a student of business management and spoke Kyrgyz and French languages. She lived for a few months in Grenoble, France. She learnt French language at the Alliance Française's school, based in Grenoble.

== Family ==
Zhibek Nukeeva and her husband Bakyt became parents to a baby boy in November 2016.

== Pageantry ==
=== Miss Kyrgyzstan 2013 ===
Nukeeva was crowned as Miss Kyrgyzstan 2013, represented Bishkek.

=== Miss World 2013 ===
Nukeeva competed at Miss World 2013 in Nusa Dua, Bali, Indonesia.

== Death ==
Zhibek died on 16 July 2017 from chondrosarcoma, a rare cancer that affects the bones and joints. She was living in Bishkek, Kyrgyzstan but was sent by her family to Turkey, to receive higher quality treatment. For the treatment, Zhibek's GoFundMe needed $80,000 to have an operation in Prague, Czech Republic. But after raising $6,172, she died as the cancer had already spread to other parts of her body.

Awards and achievements
Preceded by Diana Ovganova	Miss Kyrgyzstan; 2013	Succeeded by Aykol Alikzhanova
