= Miss World 2010 =

International beauty pageant

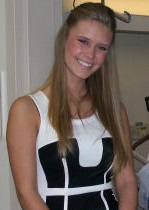
- Miss World 2010, Alexandria Mills
- Date: 30 October 2010
- Presenters: Steve Douglas; Angela Chow
- Entertainment: Shayne Ward; Dave Koz; Carlos Aponte
- Venue: Crown of Beauty Theatre, Sanya, China
- Broadcaster: E!; CCTV
- Entrants: 115
- Placements: 25
- Withdrawals: Austria; Dominican Republic; Liberia; Slovenia; Swaziland
- Returns: Cape Verde; Cayman Islands; Lesotho; Macau; Malawi; Saint Kitts and Nevis; Saint Lucia; United States Virgin Islands
- Winner: Alexandria Mills; United States

Miss World 2010 was the 60th anniversary of the Miss World pageant, held at the Crown of Beauty Theatre in Sanya, China, on 30 October 2010, after Vietnam backed out of the hosting contract.

At the conclusion of the event, Kaiane Aldorino of Gibraltar crowned Alexandria Mills of the United States as her successor at the end of the event. This is the third time the United States has won the title. And the first and second runners-up we're Botswana's Emma Wareus and Venezuela's Adriana Vasini.

== Background ==
=== Vietnam backed out ===
On 8 June 2009, Mr. Hoang Kieu (RAAS Group Chairperson) and Mrs. Morley publicly agreed on Nha Trang as host for Miss World 2010.

According to a manager of the Tien Giang Tourism JS Company, RAAS bought 31 hectares in total to build a tourism site for Miss World 2010, which led to a public debate about some national ecological reserves being devastated and people having to leave their homes due to increasing living costs.

On 28 January 2010, RAAS told Khanh Hoa People's Committee office to announce that they were no longer organising the event without an official explanation on the debate. Khanh Hoa Province then decided to host Miss World with new sponsors. RAAS would return as the main sponsor if another province was assigned as host.

Finally on 2 April 2010, Deputy Prime Minister Nguyen Thien Nhan approved a proposal by the host province Khanh Hoa to back out of hosting Miss World.

Although Miss World 2010 was held in Sanya, China, RAAS Group was still in charge of the financial backing for the event. RAAS confirmed that Miss World would be back to Mỹ Tho, Tien Giang Province later in 2011 or 2012. However, according to many reliable newswire such as VnExpress, there is no way for Miss World being organised in Tien Giang Province in 2011 or 2012 under the umbrella of RAAS because Mr. Hoang Kieu owed the landlords in the province, involved in the tourism project millions of dollars,

=== Selection of participants ===
==== Replacements ====
Ágnes Dobó, was crowned Miss World Hungary 2010 until she injured her arm and wrist. This stopped her from participating in the pageant. She was replaced by her second runner-up, Jennifer Kalo.

Due to a schedule conflict of competing in Miss Universe 2010, Miss Russia 2010, Irina Antonenko was unable to participate in the competition. The first runner-up, Irina Sharipova was appointed as a new representative.

==== Returns, and, withdrawals ====
This edition saw the return of Cape Verde, Cayman Islands, Lesotho, Macau, Malawi, Saint Kitts and Nevis, Saint Lucia and the United States Virgin Islands; Saint Kitts and Nevis, which last completed in 1988, Cape Verde and Macau in 1997, Lesotho in 2003, Malawi and the United States Virgin Islands in 2005 and Cayman Islands and Saint Lucia in 2008.

Austria, Dominican Republic, Liberia, Slovenia and Swaziland, withdrew from the competition.

== Results ==
=== Placements ===
Placement	Contestant
Miss World 2010	United States – Alexandria Mills
1st Runner-Up	Botswana – Emma Wareus
2nd Runner-Up	Venezuela – Adriana Vasini
Top 5	China – Xiao Tang; Ireland – Emma Waldron
Top 7	Italy – Giada Pezzaioli; Norway – Mariann Birkedal
Top 25	Bahamas – Braneka Bassett; Canada – Denise Garrido; Colombia – Laura Palacio; France – Virginie Dechenaud; French Polynesia – Mihilani Teixeira; Germany – Susanna Kobylinski; Kenya – Natasha Metto; Mongolia – Sarnai Amar; Namibia – Odile Gertze; Netherlands – Desirée van den Berg; Northern Ireland – Lori Moore; Paraguay – Egni Eckert; Puerto Rico – Yara Lasanta; Russia – Irina Sharipova; Saint Lucia – Aiasha Gustave; Scotland – Nicola Mimnagh; South Africa – Nicole Flint; Thailand – Sirirat Rueangsri

==== Continental Queens of Beauty ====
Continental Group	Contestant
Africa	Botswana – Emma Wareus
Americas	United States – Alexandria Mills
Asia Pacific	China – Tang Xiao
Caribbean	Saint Lucia – Aiasha Gustave
Europe	Ireland – Emma Britt Waldron

==== Order of Announcements ====
Top 25

1. Ireland
2. Northern Ireland
3. Norway
4. Puerto Rico
5. Kenya
6. Paraguay
7. Saint Lucia
8. Netherlands
9. Canada
10. France
11. Bahamas
12. Colombia
13. Russia
14. Thailand
15. South Africa
16. Mongolia
17. French Polynesia
18. Scotland
19. Venezuela
20. Namibia
21. Italy
22. United States
23. Germany
24. China
25. Botswana

Top 7

1. Venezuela
2. Ireland
3. China
4. Italy
5. Norway
6. United States
7. Botswana

Top 5

1. Venezuela
2. Botswana
3. United States
4. Ireland
5. China

== Judges ==
The judges for Miss World 2010 were:

- Julia Morley – Chairwoman of the Miss World Organization
- Denise Perrier – Miss World 1953 from France
- Ann Sidney – Miss World 1964 from United Kingdom
- Mary Stävin – Miss World 1977 from Sweden
- Agbani Darego – Miss World 2001 from Nigeria
- María Julia Mantilla – Miss World 2004 from Peru
- Zhang Zilin – Miss World 2007 from China
- Ksenia Sukhinova – Miss World 2008 from Russia
- Krish Naidoo – Miss World International Ambassador
- Mike Dixon – Miss World Musical Director
- Zhao Benshan – Actor & Comedian
- Bruce Zhao – Chairperson of the Huayu Group
- Andrew Minarik – Miss World Make-Up & Hairdresser

It was reported that Beijing may have pressured the judges to provide low scores for Mariann Birkedal, Miss Norway, because the Nobel Peace Prize was awarded to one of its political prisoners, Liu Xiaobo. At the time of the pageant, relations between China and Norway were "very strained."

== Contestants ==
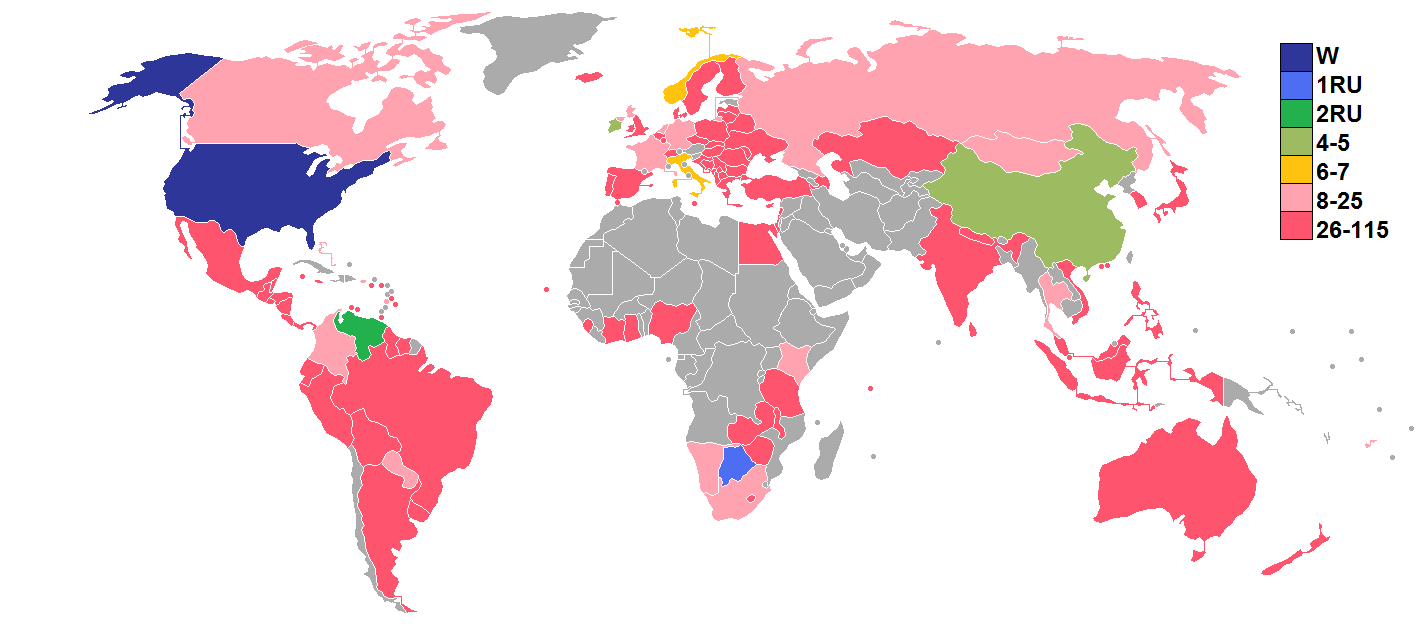
Countries and territories which sent delegates and results for Miss World 2010

115 contestants competed for the title.

Country/Territory	Contestant	Age (Note: Ages at the time of the pageant)	Hometown
Albania	Arnita Beqiraj	18	Vlorë
Angola	Ivanita Jones	23	M'banza Kongo
Argentina	Mariana Arambarry	22	Santa Rosa
Aruba	Kimberly Kuiperi	21	Tanki Leendert
Australia	Ashleigh Francis	23	Sydney
(The Bahamas) Bahamas	Braneka Bassett	20	Freeport
Barbados	Danielle Bishop	21	Bridgetown
Belarus	Lyudmila Yakimovich	22	Hrodna
Belgium	Cilou Annys	19	Bruges
Belize	Jessel Lauriano	22	Belize City
Bolivia	María Teresa Roca	24	Trinidad
Bosnia and Herzegovina	Snežana Prorok	18	Istočna Ilidža
Botswana	Emma Wareus	19	Gaborone
Brazil	Kamilla Salgado	23	Belém
Bulgaria	Romina Andonova	21	Sofia
Canada	Denise Garrido	23	Bradford
Cape Verde	Joceline Fortes	22	Sao Vicente
Cayman Islands	Cristin Alexander	23	George Town
China	Tang Xiao	23	Dalian
Colombia	Laura Palacio	23	Medellín
Costa Rica	Dayana Aguilera	19	Palmares
(Ivory Coast) Côte d'Ivoire	Inès Da Silva	21	N'zi-Comoé
Croatia	Katarina Banić	20	Trilj
Curaçao	Angenie Simon	24	Willemstad
Cyprus	Andrea Kkolou	19	Nicosia
Czech Republic	Veronika Machová	20	Rokycany
Denmark	Nataliya Averina	20	Roskilde
Ecuador	Ana Galarza	21	Ambato
Egypt	Sara El-Khouly	22	Cairo
El Salvador	Gabriela Molina	22	San Salvador
England	Jessica Linley	21	Nottingham
Ethiopia	Hiwot Assefa Tesfaye	20	Addis Ababa
Finland	Anne-Marie Nurminen	22	Helsinki
France	Virginie Dechenaud	24	La Frette
French Polynesia	Mihilani Teixeira	20	Papeete
(Georgia (country)) Georgia	Dea Arakishvili	20	Tbilisi
Germany	Susanna Kobylinski	22	Bremen
Ghana	Mimi Areme	22	Ho
Gibraltar	Larissa Dalli	23	Gibraltar
Greece	Diamanto Gasteratou	22	Athens
Guadeloupe	Ericka Aly	20	Petit-Bourg
Guatemala	Lucía Mazariegos	19	Antigua, Guatemala
Guyana	Aletha Shepherd	22	Georgetown
Honduras	Marilyn Medina	18	Tegucigalpa
Hong Kong	Sammi Cheung	23	Hong Kong
Hungary	Jennifer Kalo	22	Budapest
Iceland	Fanney Ingvarsdóttir	19	Garðabær
India	Manasvi Mamgai	22	New Delhi
Indonesia	Asyifa Latief	21	Bandung
(Republic of Ireland) Ireland	Emma Britt Waldron	21	Celbridge
Israel	Shavit Wiesel	20	Be'eri
Italy	Giada Pezzaioli	18	Montichiari
Jamaica	Chantal Alicia Raymond	24	Kingston
Japan	Hiroko Matsunaga	18	Fukuoka
Kazakhstan	Asselina Kuchukova	27	Almaty
Kenya	Natasha Metto	20	Nairobi
Latvia	Ludmila Voroncova	19	Riga
Lebanon	Rahaf Abdallah	22	Khiam
Lesotho	Karabelo Mokoallo	23	Maseru
Lithuania	Gritė Maruškevičiūtė	21	Vilnius
Luxembourg	Shari Thuyns	19	Mamer
Macau	Cherry Ng Ka-I	23	Macau
(North Macedonia) Macedonia	Stefani Borsova	20	Skopje
Malawi	Ella Kabambe	24	Blantyre
Malaysia	Nadia Min Dern Heng	25	Kuala Lumpur
Malta	Francesca Gaspar	24	Iklin
Martinique	Tully Fremcourt	20	La Trinité
Mauritius	Dalysha Doorga	23	Goodlands
Mexico	Anabel Solís	23	Mérida
Moldova	Daria Zaiteva	20	Chișinău
Mongolia	Sarnai Amar	23	Ulaanbaatar
Montenegro	Milica Milatović	18	Podgorica
Namibia	Odile Gertze	22	Windhoek
Nepal	Sadichha Shrestha	19	Kathmandu
Netherlands	Desirée van den Berg	23	Santpoort
New Zealand	Cody Yerkovich	18	Kaitaia
Nigeria	Fiona Amuzie	19	Minna
Northern Ireland	Lori Moore	20	Belfast
Norway	Mariann Birkedal	23	Stavanger
Panama	Paola Vaprio Medaglia	24	Panama City
Paraguay	Egni Eckert	23	Luque
Peru	Alexandra Liao	20	Lima
Philippines	Czarina Gatbonton	19	Malolos
Poland	Agata Szewioła	21	Żary
Portugal	Catarina Aragonez	22	Portalegre
Puerto Rico	Yara Lasanta	24	Barranquitas
Romania	Lavinia Postolache	21	Piteşti
Russia	Irina Sharipova	18	Apastovo
Saint Kitts and Nevis	Fatisha Imo	22	Basseterre
Saint Lucia	Aiasha Gustave	18	Gros Islet
Scotland	Nicola Mimnagh	21	Kilbarchan
Serbia	Milica Jelić	20	Belgrade
Sierra Leone	Neyorlyn Williams	19	Freetown
Singapore	Anusha Rajaseharan	21	Singapore
Slovakia	Marína Georgievová	18	Banská Bystrica
South Africa	Nicole Flint	22	Pretoria
South Korea (Note: Competed as Korea in the pageant)	Kim Hye-young	20	Gyeongsangbuk-do
Spain	Fátima Jiménez	21	Sevilla
Sri Lanka	Fallon Ranasinghe	22	Colombo
Suriname	Jo-ann Maria Sang	19	Paramaribo
Sweden	Dani Chelsea Karlsson	25	Stockholm
Tanzania	Genevieve Mpangala	20	Chang'ombe
Thailand	Sirirat Rueangsri	22	Chiang Mai
Trinidad and Tobago	Davia Chambers	18	Couva
Turkey	Gizem Memiç	20	Gaziantep
Uganda	Heyzme Nansubuga	25	Jinja
Ukraine	Kateryna Zakharchenko	21	Odesa
United States	Alexandria Mills	18	Louisville
United States Virgin Islands	Carolyn Carter	20	Christiansted
Uruguay	Eliana Olivera	22	Montevideo
Venezuela	Adriana Vasini	23	Maracaibo
Vietnam	Nguyễn Ngọc Kiều Khanh	19	Ho Chi Minh City
Wales	Courtenay Hamilton	20	Llantwit Major
Zambia	Zindaba Hanzala	20	Lusaka
Zimbabwe	Samantha Tshuma	21	Bulawayo

== Notes ==
=== Replacements ===
- Argentina – Carla Conrradi resigned as Miss Mundo Argentina. The 1st runner up, Marianna Arambarry was the new titleholder and Argentina's representative at Miss World 2010.
- Hong Kong – Due to a schedule conflict of competing in Miss Chinese International Pageant 2010, Toby Chan, Winner of Miss Hong Kong 2010, cannot participate in the competition. The 1st runner-up, Sammi Cheung was representative at Miss World 2010.

=== Country Changes ===
- American Virgin Islands now competes as US Virgin Islands.
