= Camille Munro =

Canadian dancer and beauty pageant titleholder

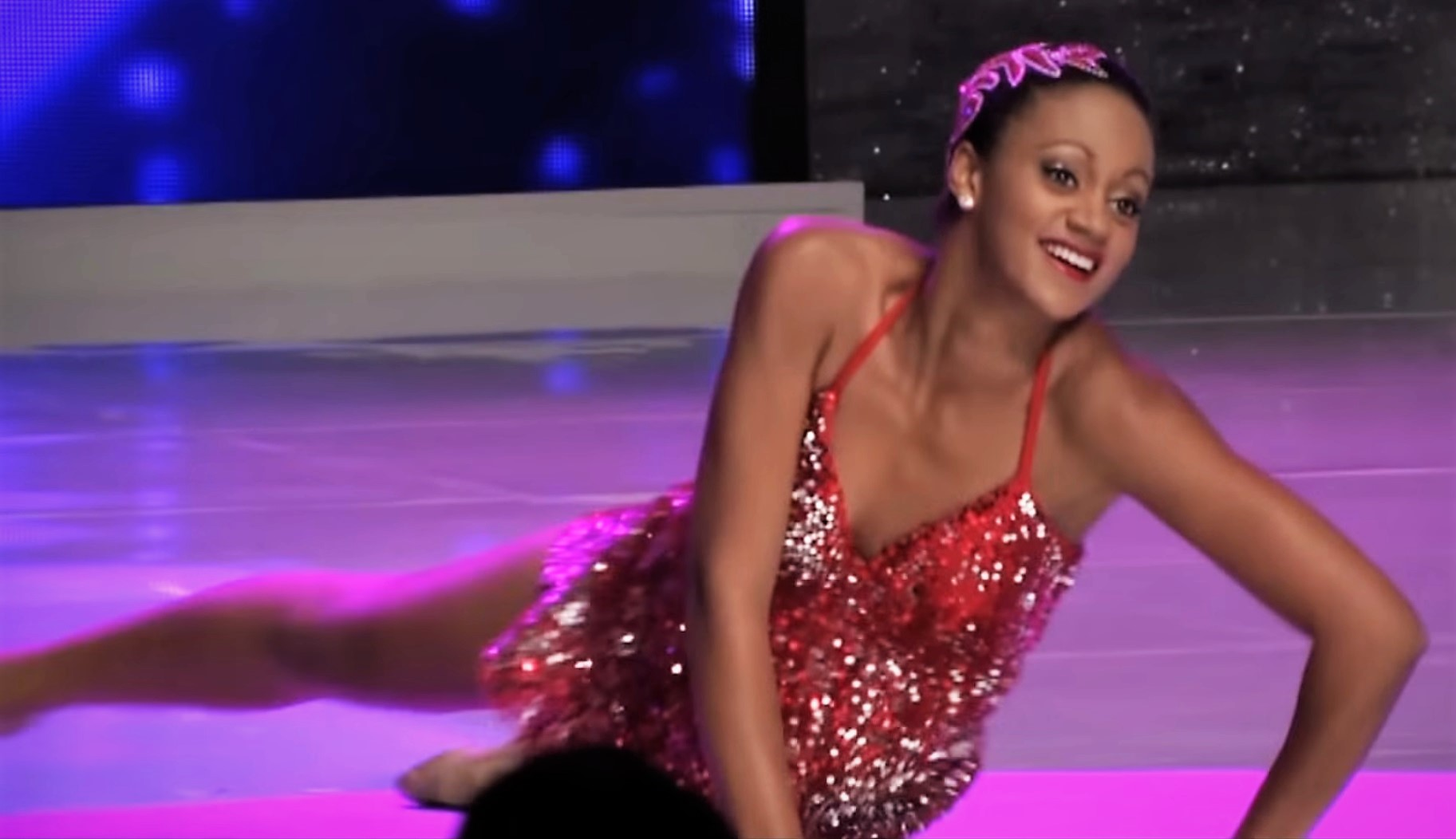
- Munro dancing at the Miss World 2013 talent competition
- Born: September 2, 1990 (age 35); Regina, Saskatchewan, Canada
- Occupation: Dance instructor

Camille Munro (born September 2, 1990) is a Canadian dancer and beauty pageant titleholder. In 2013, she became the first woman from Saskatchewan to be named Miss World Canada in 50 years. The competition took place in Richmond, British Columbia. There were 35 contestants at the pageant, but Munro was the only one from Saskatchewan. She planned to spend the year practicing humanitarianism. Her win secured her entry into the Miss World 2013 pageant in Jakarta, Indonesia that September where she made the top 20 out of 127 contestants and placed 5th place overall in the talent segment of the competition. Also that year, Munro graduated from the University of Regina with a bachelor's degree in human justice. As part of her program, she did an internship with the United Way of Canada.

Preceded by Tara Teng	Miss World Canada; 2013	Succeeded by Annora Bourgeault
