= Erin Holland =

Australian singer, dancer, actress, model

Erin Victoria Holland
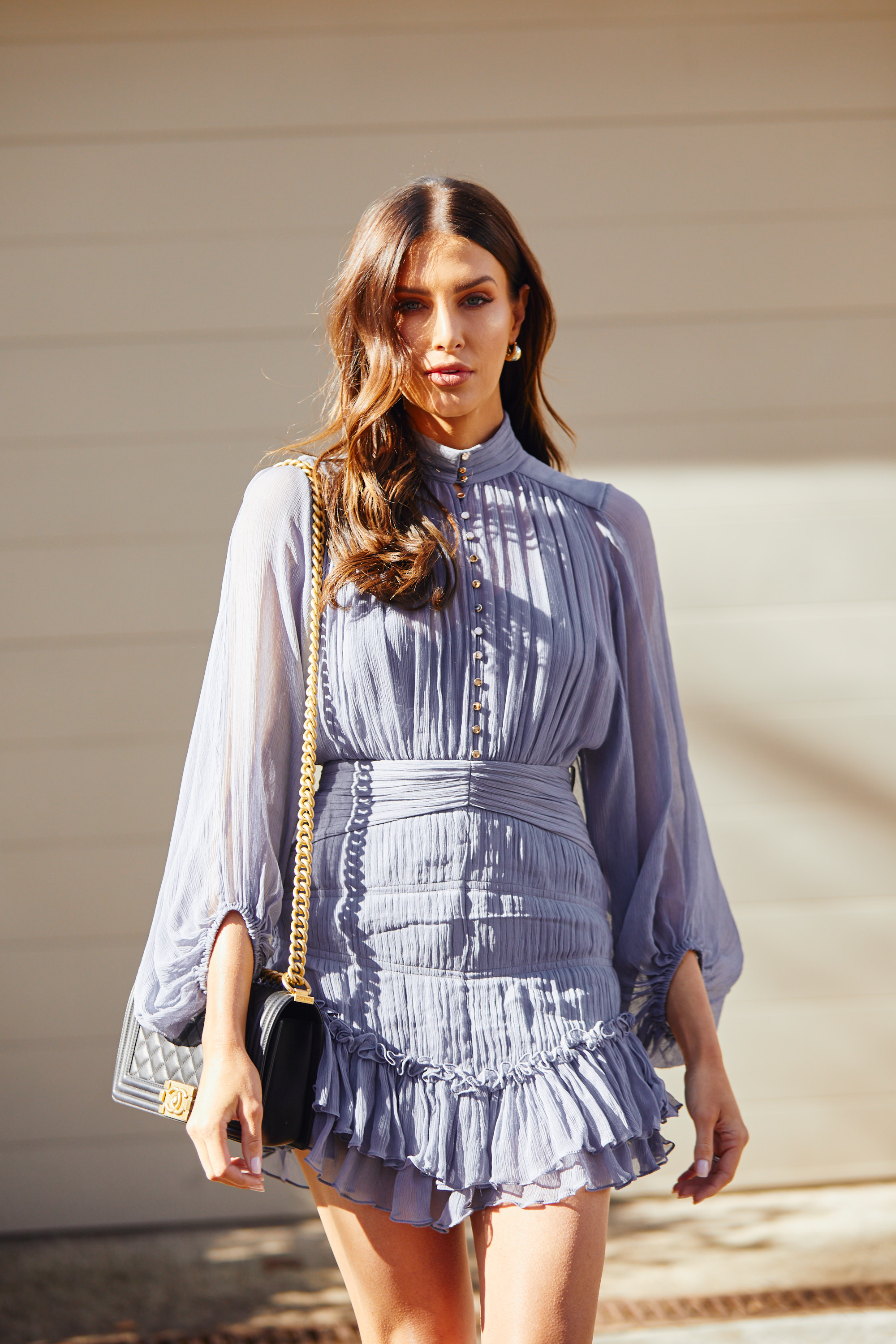
- Holland at Australian Fashion Week in 2021
- Born: Erin Victoria Holland; 21 March 1989 (age 37); Cairns, Queensland, Australia
- Occupations: Singer; presenter; actress; model; dancer
- Height: 1.77 m (5 ft 10 in)
- Spouse: Ben Cutting (m. 2021)
- Beauty pageant titleholder
- Title: Miss World Australia 2013; Miss World Oceania 2013
- Hair color: Blonde
- Eye color: Blue/green
- Major competitions: Miss World Australia 2013 (Winner); Miss World 2013; (Top 10)

Erin Victoria Holland (born 21 March 1989) is an Australian singer, TV host, model, dancer, charity worker and beauty pageant titleholder. She won her national title, Miss World Australia, on 20 July 2013.

She has also featured as a sports presenter at the Pakistan Super League in seasons 4, 5, 7, and 8, 9 and currently 10 covering the matches on ground as well as post-match ceremonies. She is married to Australian cricketer Ben Cutting.

== Early life ==
Holland was born in Cairns, Far North Queensland to parents Trish and Mark Holland. Her love of music began from 3 years of age, when her father taught her how to play the recorder. Since this early introduction, she trained as a classical, musical theatre and jazz singer, played the clarinet and saxophone and studied musical theory, with the dream of one day starring as a leading lady on Broadway.

Holland trained in jazz and tap dancing from the age of 4, receiving honours in Advanced R.A.D Examinations. Throughout her schooling, she performed in orchestras, big bands, choirs, wind ensembles and many musicals.

Her amateur theatre credits included lead roles in Anything Goes (Reno Sweeney), Beauty and the Beast (Belle), Annie (Lily) and Fame (Carmen). Upon graduating from Cairns State High School in 2006, Erin moved to Sydney to pursue her dreams, to study on scholarship at the Sydney Conservatorium of Music.

== Education ==
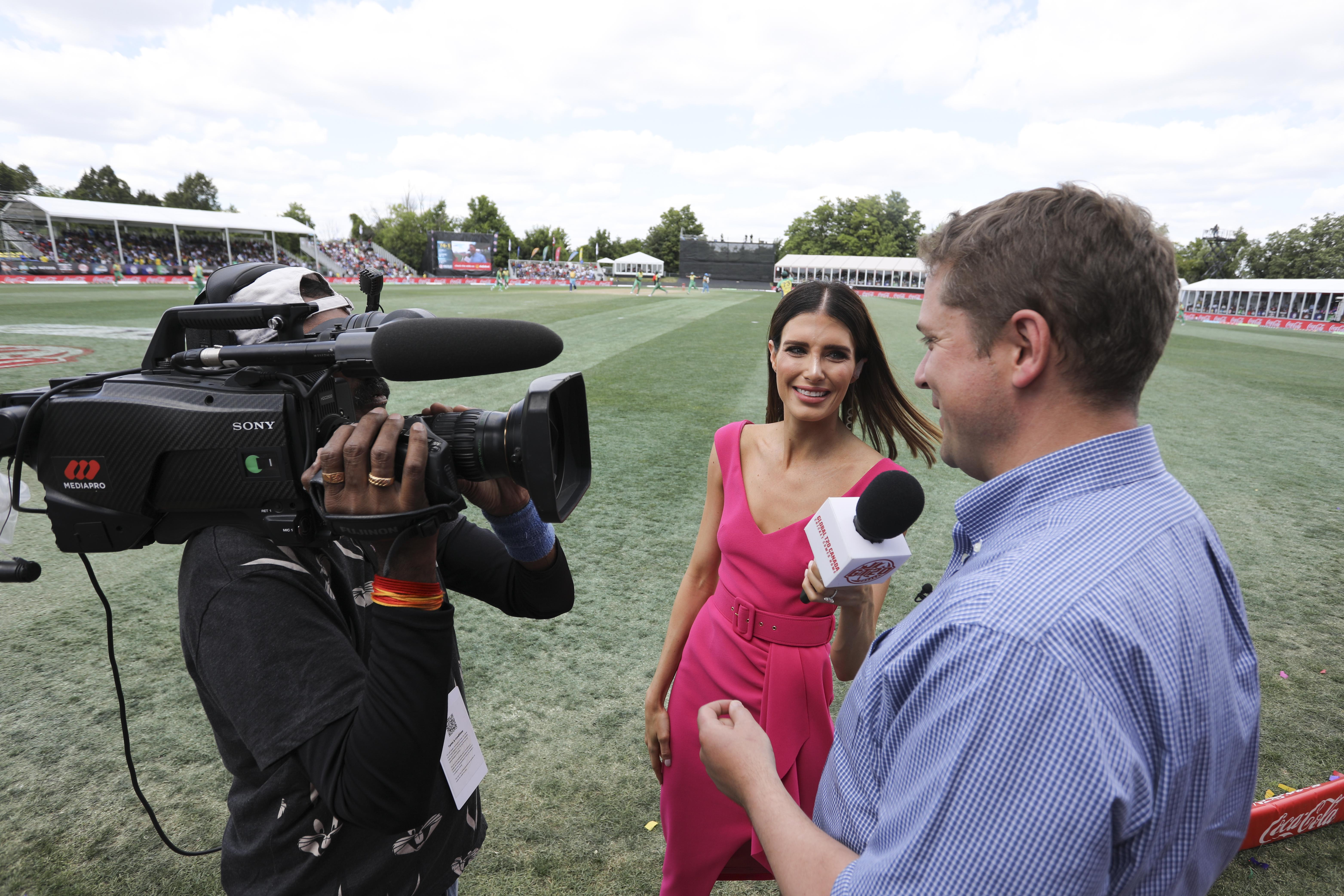
Holland interviewing Andrew Scheer during a cricket tournament in Brampton

Holland is a classically trained soprano singer holding a Bachelor of Classical Voice degree from the Sydney Conservatorium of Music. She received a scholarship after graduating from Cairns State High School in 2006. Erin also received a Music Scholarship from The Women's College, University of Sydney, where she lived throughout the 4 years of her bachelor's degree.

She has achieved advanced qualifications in Classical Voice, Clarinet and Theory A.M.E.B examinations, as well as Jazz and Tap dance examinations.

== Modelling career ==
=== Miss World Australia 2013 ===
Holland beat 32 finalists to be crowned Miss World Australia on 20 July 2013. For the talent component of the competition, Holland sang "Maybe This Time" from the 1972 musical film Cabaret, receiving first place, and Miss World Australia Talent. She went on to represent Australia in the Miss World International competition in Bali, Indonesia. She credits her success to her family and friends, and the Miss World Australia organization.

=== Miss World 2013 ===
Holland was awarded the Miss World Continental Queen of Beauty, Oceania on 28 September 2013, placing in the Top 10 of the overall competition out of 130 countries. For the talent component of the competition, she performed "Someone Like You" from the 1990 musical Jekyll & Hyde, where she received first Runner-up, Erin also placed first Runner-up in the coveted Beauty With A Purpose philanthropy component and eighth in Interview.

As the reigning Miss World Oceania, Erin has travelled with the Miss World organisation since the competition, performing and attending events in China and United States; most recently performing and judging the International Mister World 2014 competition in England.

== Charity work ==
Holland is an ambassador for the International Beauty with a Purpose Charity as a former Beauty Queen. This has seen her actively involved in providing aid for the Lilla Community, a remote Indigenous community located in the Northern Territory, Australia. She is also involved with Variety, the Children's Charity, and Make-A-Wish Foundation, and is an ambassador for McHappy Day, supporting the Ronald McDonald Charity.
