= Sherrece Villafana =

Trinadad and Tobago beauty queen (born 1993)

Sherrece Daliah Dalana Mary Villafana
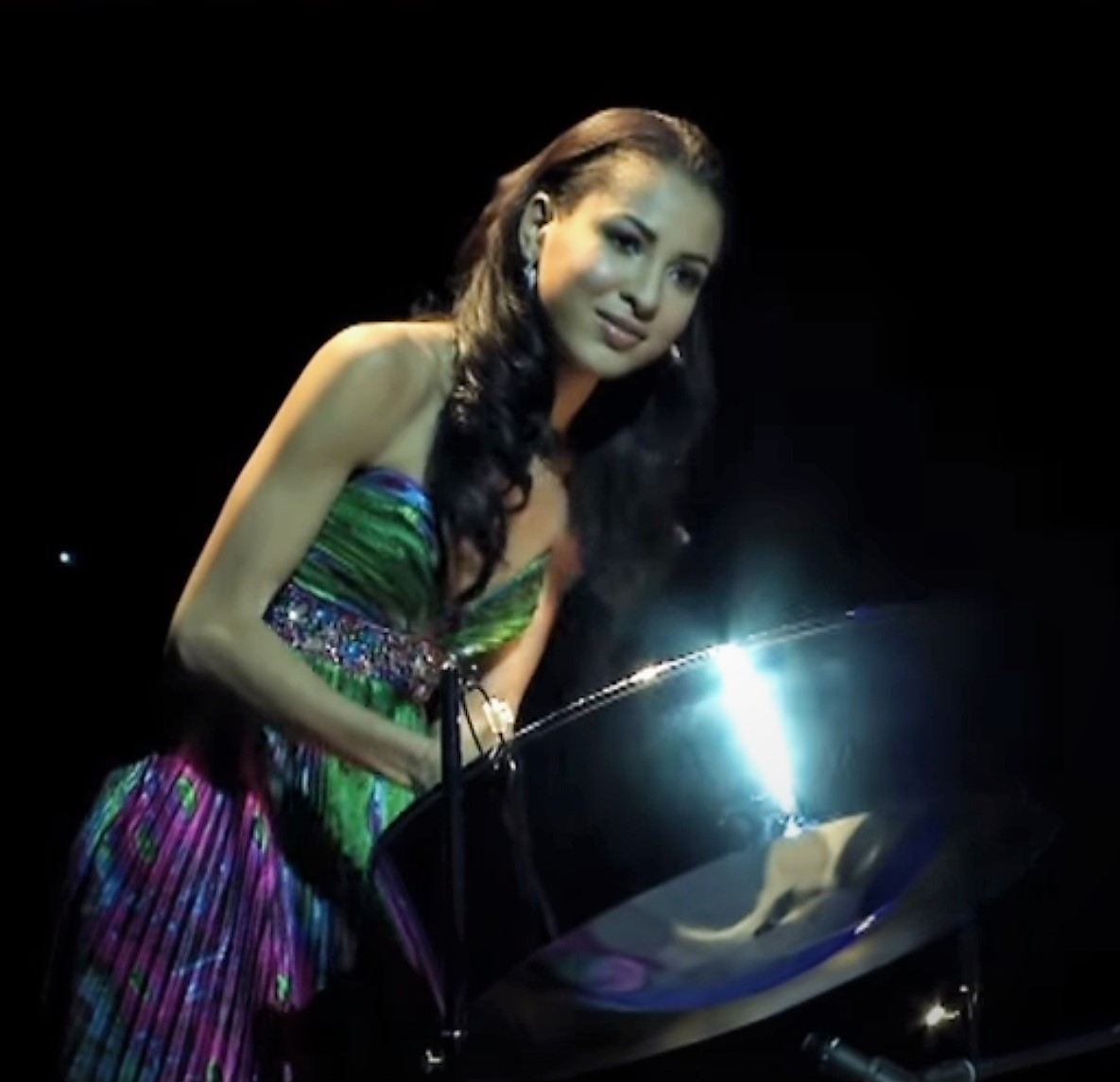
- Villafana drumming at the 2013 Miss World talent competition
- Born: 24 October 1993 (age 32); San Fernando, Trinidad and Tobago
- Height: 1.75 m (5 ft 9 in)
- Beauty pageant titleholder
- Hair color: Black
- Eye color: Brown
- Major competitions: Miss World Trinidad and Tobago 2013 (Winner)

Sherrece Villafana (born 24 October 1993) is a Trinidadian actress and beauty pageant titleholder who won Miss Trinidad and Tobago 2013 and represented her country at Miss World 2013 in Bali, Indonesia. Villafana was stripped of her crown on 25 November 2013 due to conflicts with the then Pageant Director Athalia Samuel about funding.
