= Emma Wareus =

Miss Botswana 2010 (born 1990)

- Born: Emma Wareus; 28 July 1990 (age 36); Gaborone, Botswana
- Beauty pageant titleholder
- Hair color: Black
- Eye color: Brown
- Major competitions: Miss Botswana 2009 (1st runner-up); Miss Botswana 2010 (Winner); Miss World 2010 (1st runner-up) (Miss World Africa)

Emma Wareus (born 28 July 1990) is a Motswana model and beauty pageant titleholder who was crowned Miss Botswana 2010 and represented her country at Miss World 2010 where she placed first runner-up on 30 October 2010 in Sanya, China. This is the highest placement for a woman from her country in the history of the pageant, and the highest placement of a Botswana beauty queen since Mpule Kwelagobe won Miss Universe 1999.

Awards and achievements
Preceded by (Mexico) Perla Beltrán	Miss World (1st Runner-Up); 2010	Succeeded by (Philippines) Gwendoline Ruais
