= Ngô Phương Lan =

Vietnamese beauty pageant contestant

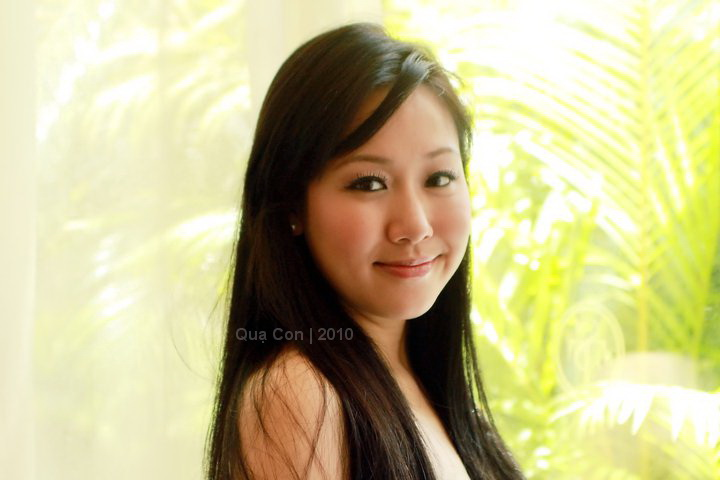
- Born: Ngô Phương Lan; 12 March 1987 (age 39); Hanoi, Vietnam
- Height: 1.72 m (5 ft 8 in)
- Beauty pageant titleholder
- Title: 1st Runner-up Miss Vietnam UK 2007; Miss Vietnam World 2007
- Hair color: Black
- Eye color: Black
- Major competitions: Miss Vietnam UK 2007 (1st Runner-up); Miss Vietnam World 2007 (Winner)

Ngô Phương Lan (born 12 March 1987, in Hanoi) is Miss Vietnam World 2007 and first runner up at Miss Vietnam UK 2007.

Preceded by First	Miss Vietnamese World; 2007	Succeeded by Luu Thi Diem Huong
