= Rex Pemberton =

Australian mountaineer

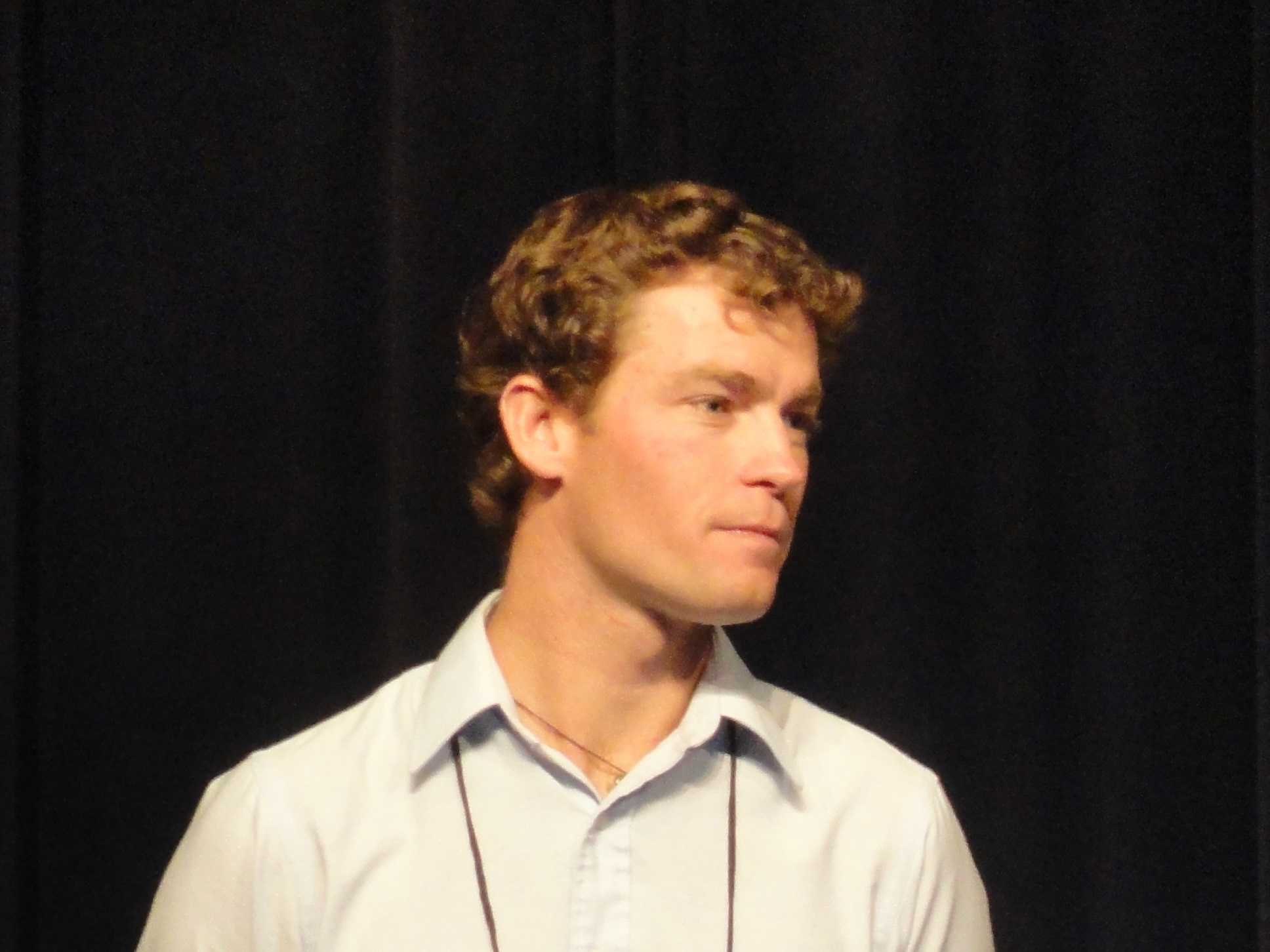
- Rex Pemberton at Oracle ThinkQuest Live 2011
- Relatives: Caroline Pemberton (sister)

Rex Pemberton (born 1983) is an extreme sport participant and motivational speaker, best known as being the youngest male Australian ever to climb Mount Everest.

== Mountaineering ==
Born and raised in Sydney, Pemberton was educated at Knox Grammar School and the University of Western Sydney. He climbed his first alpine peak when he was 16. He raised $100,000 for his Everest climb and another $100,000 to fund his climbs of the remaining Seven Summits, which he completed in 2006 and was the third youngest person in the world to complete this feat. He produced a documentary film of his Everest ascent, entitled To Stand Above the Clouds.

== Wingsuit Flying ==
As a keen skydiver, Rex soon transitioned to wingsuit flying then progressing to wingsuit base jumping and proximity flying. Rex rose to the top of the wingsuit world and now competes at the world championships, with third place being his best result.

Rex has designed and built the X-Wing, a jet powered carbon-fiber wing.

== Personal life ==
Pemberton is married to Emily Guilding. He is the brother of former Miss Australia Caroline Pemberton.

== Filmography ==
- To Stand Above the Clouds (2006)
