= Altynai Botoyarova =

Kyrgyz model (born 2004)

- Born: December 27, 2004 (age 21); Bishkek, Kyrgyzstan
- Occupations: Model; beauty pageant titleholder
- Height: 1.75 m (5 ft 9 in)
- Beauty pageant titleholder
- Title: Miss Kyrgyzstan 2021
- Hair color: Black
- Eye color: Brown
- Major competitions: Miss Kyrgyzstan 2021 (Winner); Miss Universe 2022 (Unplaced)

Altynai Botoyarova (Kyrgyz: Алтынай Ботоярова; born 27 December 2004) is a Kyrgyz model and beauty pageant titleholder who was crowned Miss Kyrgyzstan 2021.

== Early life ==
Botoyarova was a student of business management, and spoke Kyrgyz and English languages. For a few months, she lived in London, Great Britain. She learnt English language in the Alliance Great Britain's school, based in London.

== Family ==
Altynai Botoyarova was born on 27 December 2004 in Bishkek, Kyrgyzstan to a Kyrgyz family.

== Pageantry ==
=== Miss Kyrgyzstan 2021 ===
Botoyarova was crowned as Miss Kyrgyzstan 2021, representing Bishkek.

=== Miss Universe 2022 ===
Botoyarova competed at Miss Universe 2022 in New Orleans Morial Convention Center, New Orleans, Louisiana, United States.

Awards and achievements
| Preceded by Lazat Nurkozhoeva | Miss Kyrgyzstan; 2021 | Succeeded by Maya Turdalieva |
