= Anna Zayachkivska =

Ukrainian model

Anna Zaiachkivska
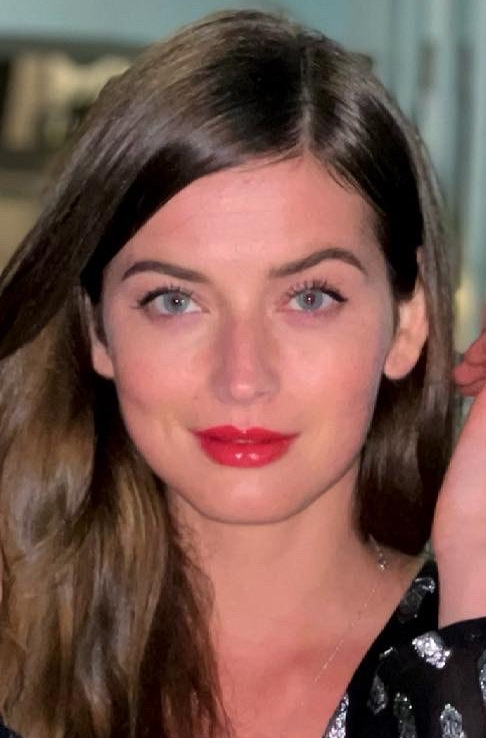
- Born: 12 December 1991 (age 34); Ivano-Frankivsk, Ukraine
- Beauty pageant titleholder
- Title: Miss Ukraine 2013
- Major competitions: Miss Ukraine 2013 (Winner); Miss World 2013 (Top 20)
- Website: Official website

Anna Zaiachkivska (Ukrainian: Анна Заячківська; born 12 December 1991) is a Ukrainian model and beauty pageant titleholder who was crowned Miss Ukraine 2013 and represented her country at the Miss World 2013 pageant where she placed in the Top 20.

== Life and career ==
Zayachkivska is from Ivano-Frankivsk, in Ukraine. At the time of her participation at the Miss World 2013 pageant, she was a fourth-year student at the Art Institute of Vasyl Stefanyk Ciscarpathian National University, majoring in religious art. Zayachkivska was a volunteer (serving hot coffee and tea to the protesters, working in the medical center, and administering the Maydanneeds.com website) during the late 2013/early 2014 Euromaidan protests.

Preceded by Karina Zhyronkina	Miss Ukraine; 2013	Succeeded by Andriana Khasanshin
