= Alexandria Mills =

American model and Miss World 2010

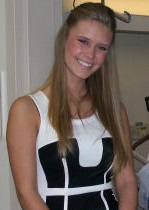
- Mills in 2011
- Born: Alexandria Mills; February 26, 1992 (age 34); Louisville, Kentucky, U.S.
- Height: 1.78 m (5 ft 10 in)
- Beauty pageant titleholder
- Title: Miss World 2010; Miss World America 2010
- Hair color: Blonde
- Eye color: Blue

Alexandria Nichole Mills (born February 26, 1992) is an American model and beauty queen who was crowned Miss World 2010 on October 30, 2010, in Sanya, China. Mills is the third woman from the United States to win Miss World.

== Early life ==
Mills, a resident of Shepherdsville, Kentucky, had an interest in modeling at least as early as the eighth grade; following Mills' victory in Miss World 2010, a counselor at her middle school recalled that she had a modeling portfolio even then. The counselor also recalled her as being "very outgoing and very confident", and that Mills had demonstrated fearlessness by volunteering to sing "God Bless America" over the school intercom.

Prior to participating in Miss World, 18-year-old Mills was homeschooled for high school, graduating shortly before the competition, and wanted to become a teacher. According to her mother, she also has an interest in landscape photography. A vegetarian, Mills was also a fashion model and was listed with Elite Models agency.

== Miss World 2010 ==
Mills was appointed as Miss World America 2010 to represent her country at the 2010 Miss World pageant held in Sanya, China. She placed first runner-up during the Miss World Beach Beauty fast track event held on October 19 and second-runner-up in Miss World Top Model was held on October 23, becoming the eventual winner of Miss World 2010 on October 30.

Awards and achievements
Preceded by (Gibraltar) Kaiane Aldorino	Miss World; 2010	Succeeded by (Venezuela) Ivian Sarcos
Preceded by (Mexico) Perla Beltrán	Miss World Americas; 2010	Succeeded by (Venezuela) Ivian Sarcos
Preceded by Lisa-Marie Kohrs	Miss World America; 2010	Succeeded by Erin Cummins
