= Kimberly Farrah Singh =

Trinidadian model

- Born: Kimberly Farrah Singh; December 30, 1993 (age 32); Tabaquite, Trinidad and Tobago
- Beauty pageant titleholder
- Title: Miss Trinidad and Tobago 2015 (Winner)
- Hair color: Black
- Eye color: Light Brown
- Major competitions: Miss World 2015 (Unplaced)

Kimberly Farrah Singh is a Trinidadian beauty pageant titleholder. She represented Trinidad and Tobago in Miss World 2015 in Sanya, China on December 19, 2015.

== Personal life ==
Kimberly Farrah Singh grew up in the countryside of Trinidad, in the town of Tabaquite. In 2012, after doing an internship at the Attorney General's office, she studied Paralegal Studies an aspired to become an Attorney at Law. Farrah Singh states that she is a strong believer in fairness and equality. She said her vocation would enable her to be an advocate for justice to the unheard and silenced individuals in society.

Kimberly enjoys cooking meals such as curry (chicken, duck and goat), roti and pelau. Since the age of 3, she has practiced and enjoyed singing due to the joy it brings her and its capacity to change the mood of the listening audience. She is the leader of her church's choir. From a very early age, Kimberly was involved in lots of charity prior to her victory as Miss Trinidad and Tobago 2015. Farrah Singh is passionate about helping disadvantaged children, and is a firm believer that they hold the keys to the future. Farrah Singh states that her goal is to help these children tap into their "beautiful purpose" through empowerment sessions which aim to boost their self-esteem and self-image, and thus encourage them to pursue their dreams and aspirations. She has stated that it is her desire to make a difference in as many lives as she can and to see each child live in purpose, equality, and pure happiness, starting with the children of Trinidad and Tobago.

== Miss Trinidad and Tobago 2015 ==
On July 25, 2015, Kimberly Farrah Singh was crowned Miss Trinidad and Tobago 2015.
