= Miss Bosne i Hercegovine =

Beauty pageant

Miss Bosne i Hercegovine (BiH)
- Formation: 1996
- Type: Beauty pageant
- Headquarters: Sarajevo
- Location(s): Bosnia and Herzegovina
- Official language: Bosnian
- Executive Director: Stela Zubak Jovanović
- Key people: Zdravko Zubak
- Affiliations: Miss World
- Website: www.missbih.ba

Miss Bosne i Hercegovine (Miss Bosnia and Herzegovina) is a national beauty pageant in Bosnia and Herzegovina.

== History ==
The Miss BiH organization has been a national preliminary to Miss World since 1996, und is under directorship of Zdravko Zubak. The competition winner is sent to Miss World.

== Titleholders ==
Color key

- Declared as Winner
- Ended as runner-up
- Ended as one of the finalists or semifinalists

Year	Miss Bosne i Hercegovine	Placement at Miss World
1996	Belma Zvrko	
1997	Elma Terzić	
1998	Samra Tojaga	
1999	Samra Begović	
2000	Jasmina Mahmutović	
2001	Ana Mirjana Račanović	
2002	Danijela Vinš	Top 20
2003	Irna Smaka	
2004	Njegica Balorda	
2005	Sanja Tunjić	
2006	Azra Gazdić	Miss World Beach Beauty (Top 25)
2007	Gordana Tomić	
2008	Tanja Vujičić	
2009	Andrea Šarac	Miss World Talent (Top 22)
2010	Snežana Prorok	Miss World Beach Beauty (Top 20)
2011	Snežana Kuzmanović	
2012	Fikreta Husić	
2013	Sanda Gutić	
2014	Isidora Borovčanin	Miss World Top Model
2015	Marijana Marković	World Fashion Designer Dresses (Top 10)
2016	Halida Krajišnik	
2017	Aida Karamehmedović	Miss World Top Model (Top 30)
2018	Anđela Paleksić	
2019	Ivana Ladan	Miss World Top Model (Top 40)
2020	Due to the impact of COVID-19 pandemic, no pageant in 2020	
2021	Adna Biber	
2023	Anđela Gajić	
2025	Ena Adrović	
2026	Lana Jahić	
