= Julia Morley =

British beauty pageant organizer

Julia Morley CBE
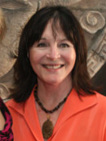
- Morley at Miss World 2007
- Born: Julia Evelyn Pritchard; 25 October 1939 (age 86); London, England
- Occupations: Chairwoman of the Miss World Organization; President of Variety International 2009–2011
- Spouse: Eric Morley (m. 1960; died 2000)
- Children: 5

Julia Evelyn Morley CBE (née Pritchard; born 25 October 1939) is an English businesswoman, charity worker and former model. She is the chairwoman and CEO of the Miss World Organization, which organizes the Miss World and Mister World pageants. She is the widow of Miss World creator, the late Eric Morley who organized the pageant from its inception in July 1951, until his death in 2000.

== Life and career ==
Born in London, she worked as a model, and met Eric Morley, then a director of Mecca Dancing, at a dance hall in Leeds; the couple married in 1960. She became chairman of Miss World after her husband died in 2000.

As chairman of Miss World, she introduced "Beauty With A Purpose", in 1972, which raises money in support of sick and disadvantaged children. In 2009, Morley used the opening of the Miss World Festival to launch the Variety International Children’s Fund with a Charity Dinner which raised over $400,000 for nutritional, educational and medical projects in Haiti. She was conferred the Priyadarshini Award for her ‘Save the Children’ campaign. In 2016, Morley received the Variety Humanitarian Award.

Morley was appointed Commander of the Order of the British Empire (CBE) in the 2022 Birthday Honours for charitable and voluntary services to disadvantaged people in the UK and abroad.
