= Miss World Italy =

Beauty pageant

Miss Mondo Italia
- Formation: 1954
- Type: Beauty pageant
- Headquarters: Rome
- Location: Italy
- Members: Miss World
- Official language: Italian
- Website: missmondo.it

Miss Mondo Italia, or Miss World Italy, is an Italian beauty pageant in Italy that selects the Italian representative for the Miss World pageant. The pageant was first organized in 1954 and it is not related to Miss Italy or Miss Universo Italia, although some delegates have crossed over from one format to the other throughout the years.

== History ==
While the official winner or 1st Runner-up of Miss Italia represented Italy at the Miss World on a few occasions (from 1959 to 1962, and in 1964 1971 and 1978), the candidate was otherwise selected via castings or independent pageant. The contest gained notoriety in 2000, when winner Giorgia Palmas went on to become the 1st runner-up at Miss World 2000, and found its final incarnation in 2005 as Miss Mondo Italia - La sfida italiana. After a streak of 25 consecutive missed placements from 1974 to 2000, a number of Italian delegates have had strong showings over the last few years: Sofia Bruscoli was a Top 6 finalist in 2005, Giada Pezzaioli made it to the Top 7 in 2010, and Tania Bambaci was a semifinalist in 2011.

== Titleholders ==
Color key

- Declared as Winner
- Ended as runner-up
- Ended as one of the finalists or semifinalists

Year	Miss World Italy	Region	Placement at Miss World
2005	Sofia Bruscoli	Emilia-Romagna	Top 6 Continental Queen of Europe; Performing Talent (Top 5); Beach Beauty (Top 19)
2006	Elizaveta Migatcheva	Lazio	Performing Talent (1st Runner-up); Best World Dress Designer (Top 20); Sports and Fitness (Top 24); Beach Beauty (Top 25)
2007	Giada Wiltshire	Emilia-Romagna	Performing Talent (Top 20); Beach Beauty (Top 21)
2008	Claudia Russo	Sicily	Top Model (Top 32)
2009	Alice Taticchi	Umbria	Best Dress Designer Award (Top 12); Top Model (Top 12)
2010	Giada Pezzaioli	Lombardy	Top 7 Beach Beauty (Top 40)
2011	Tania Bambaci	Sicily	Top 15; Top Model (1st Runner-up); Beach Beauty (Top 10)
2012	Jessica Bellinghieri	Sicily	Beach Beauty (Top 40)
2013	Sarah Baderna	Emilia-Romagna	Top 20; Top Model (Top 10); Beach Beauty (Top 11); Sports and Fitness (Top 20)
2014	Silvia Cataldi	Apulia	Beach Beauty (Top 10); Top Model (Top 15)
2015	Greta Galassi	Trentino-Alto Adige	Top Model (1st Runner-Up)
2016	Giada Tropea	Calabria	Unplaced
2017	Conny Notarstefano	Lazio	Top 40; Performing Talent (Top 5); Sports and Fitness (Top 23)
2018	Nunzia Amato	Campania	Miss World Top Model (Top 32); Beauty with a Purpose (Top 25)
2019	Adele Sammartino	Campania	Miss World Top Model (Top 40)
2020	Due to the impact of COVID-19 pandemic, no pageant in 2020		
2021	Claudia Motta	Lazio	Sports (Top 32)
2022	Miss World 2021 was rescheduled to 16 March 2022 due to the COVID-19 pandemic outbreak in Puerto Rico, no edition started in 2022		
2023	Rebecca Arnone	Turin	Top 40
2024	No competition held		
2025	Chiara Esposito	Campania	Top 20
2026	Lucrezia Mangilli	Friuli-Venezia Giulia	Unplaced
2027	Sofia Viola	Campania	TBA
2028	Mia Zottoli Montanaro	Apulia	TBA

=== 1954-2004 ===
Year	Miss World Italy	Placement at Miss World
2004	Valeria Altobelli	Unplaced
2003	Silvia Cannas	Unplaced
2002	Susanne Zuber	Top 20
2001	Paola d'Antonino	Unplaced
2000	Giorgia Palmas	1st Runner-up
1999	Gloria Nicoletti	Unplaced
1998	Concetta Travaglini	Unplaced
1997	Irene Lippi	Unplaced
1996	Mara de Gennaro	Unplaced
1995	Rosanna Santoli	Unplaced
1994	Arianna Novacco	Unplaced
1993	Barbara Chiappini	Unplaced
1992	Paola Irrera	Unplaced
1991	Sabina Pellati	Unplaced
1990	Cristina Gavagnin	Unplaced
1989	Paola Mercurio	Unplaced
1988	Giulia Gemo	Unplaced
1987	Barbara Martinuzzi	Unplaced
1986	Enrica Patane	Unplaced
1985	Cosetta Antoniolli	Unplaced
1984	Federica Tersch	Unplaced
1983	Barbara Previato	Unplaced
1982	Raffaella del Rosario	Unplaced
1981	Marisa Tutone	Unplaced
1980	Stefania de Pasquaci	Unplaced
1979	Rossana Serratore	Unplaced
1978	Loren Mai	Unplaced
1976	Antonella Lombrosi	Unplaced
1975	Vanna Bortolini	Unplaced
1974	Zaira Zoccheddu	Unplaced
1973	Marva Bartolucci	Top 15
1972	Laura Romano	Unplaced
1971	Maria Pinnone	Unplaced
1970	Marika de Poi	Unplaced
1968	Pia Gianporcaro	Unplaced
1967	Tamara Baroni	Top 15
1966	Gigliola Carbonara	Top 15
1965	Guya Libraro	Unplaced
1964	Mirka Sartori	6th Runner-up
1962	Raffaella da Carolis	Unplaced
1961	Franca Cattaneo	Unplaced
1960	Layla Rigazzi	Top 10
1959	Paola Falchi	Unplaced
1958	Elisabetta Velinsky	Top 10
1957	Anna Gorassini	Unplaced
1956	Angela Portaluri	Unplaced
1955	Franca Incorvaia	Unplaced
1954	Cristina Fantoni	Unplaced

== Notes ==
Miss World started in 1951, but Italy send its first delegate, Cristina Fantoni, only in 1954. Italy withdraws three times: in 1963, in 1969 and in 1977. The highest placement from Italian representative was placing by Giorgia Palmas as the 1st Runner-up and awarding as Queen of Europe in 2000.
