= Miss Guatemala 2008 =

- Date: March 7, 2008
- Venue: Auditorio Nacional, Guatemala City, Guatemala
- Broadcaster: Guatevisión
- Entrants: 7
- Winner: Clara Jennifer Chiong Estrada; Quetzaltenango

The Miss Guatemala 2008 pageant was held on March 7, 2008 at Auditorio Nacionalin in Guatemala City, Guatemala. This year only 7 candidates were competing for the national crown. The chosen winner represented Guatemala at the Miss Universe 2008 and at Miss Continente Americano 2008. The winner of best national costume, the costume will be use in Miss Universe 2008. Miss World Guatemala represented Guatemala at the Miss World 2008. Miss Guatemala Internacional represented Guatemala at Miss International 2008.

== Final results ==
Final results	Contestant
Miss Guatemala 2008	Quetzaltenango - Jennifer Chiong
Miss World Guatemala	Guatemala - Maribel Arana
Miss Guatemala Internacional	Chimaltenango - Wendy Albizures

=== Special awards ===
- Miss Photogenic – Casetie Dubois (Alta Verapaz)
- Miss Congeniality (voted by the candidates) – Jessica Donabó (Izabal)
- Best National Costume – Rita Meda (Ciudad Capital)

== Official delegates ==
Represent	Contestant	Age	Height	Hometown
Alta Verapaz	Casetie Lily Dubois Caravantes	23	1.74 m (5 ft 8 1/2 in)	Copán
Chimaltenango	Wendy Karina Albizures del Cid	19	1.83 m (6 ft 0 in)	Chimaltenango
Ciudad Capital	Rita Elizabeth Meda Cojulún	19	1.77 m (5 ft 9 1/2 in)	Ciudad Guatemala
Guatemala	Ana Maribel Arana Ruiz	22	1.79 m (5 ft 10 1/2 in)	Villa Nueva
Izabal	Jessica Jazmín Donabó Chávez	19	1.75 m (5 ft 9 in)	Puerto Barrios
Jalapa	Luz Yohana Marroquín Morán	20	1.76 m (5 ft 9 1/2 in)	Jalapa
Quetzaltenango	Clara Jennifer Chiong Estrada	24	1.81 m (5 ft 11 1/2 in)	Quetzaltenango
