= Egla (disambiguation) =

Egla may refer to:

- Egil's Saga
- Egla Harxhi, the Albanian beauty pageant contestant
- EGLA airport, ICAO code for Bodmin Airfield
