= Quinteros =

Surname

Quinteros is a surname. Notable people with the surname include:

- Agustina Quinteros (born 1990), beauty queen who represented Argentina in Miss World 2008 in South Africa
- Bansi Quinteros (born 1976), trance keyboardist born in Barcelona
- Carlos Quinteros, Guatemalan communist
- Daniel Quinteros (born 1976), Argentine football midfielder
- Elena Quinteros (1945–1976), school teacher arrested and killed during the civic - military Uruguayan dictatorship
- Gustavo Quinteros (born 1965), former Argentine-Bolivian football defender
- Henry Quinteros (born 1977), football midfielder from Peru
- Jorge Quinteros (born 1974), retired Argentine footballer
- Jorge Quinteros (mountaineer), Chilean mountaineer with an extensive career as explorer, guide and teacher
- Lorenzo Quinteros (born 1945), Argentine cinema and theatre actor
- Luis Ignacio Quinteros (born 1979), Chilean football striker
- Marcelo Quinteros (born 1976), Argentine football midfielder
- Marco Andrés Estrada Quinteros (born 1983), Chilean football defender
- Miguel Quinteros (born 1947), Argentine chess grandmaster
- Paolo Quinteros (born 1979), Argentine professional basketball player
