= Aggeliki =

Aggeliki is a given name. People with the given name include:

- Aggeliki Iliadi
- Aggeliki Tsiolakoudi
- Aggeliki Papoulia
- Aggeliki Daliani
- Aggeliki Kalaitzi
- Aggeliki Exarchou
- Aggelika Korovessi

== See also ==
- Angelica (given name)
