= Kalaitzis =

Kalaitzis or Kalaitzi is a surname. Notable people with the surname include:

- Georgios Kalaitzis
- Giannis Kalaitzis
- Aggeliki Kalaitzi
