= Miss Cayman Islands =

Beauty pageant

The Miss Cayman Islands Organization
- Formation: 1932; 94 years ago
- Type: Beauty pageant
- Headquarters: George Town
- Location: Cayman Islands
- Members: Miss Universe; Miss World; Miss Supranational
- Official language: English
- Chairperson: Derri Dacres-Lee
- Key people: Moses Kirkconnell, Ministry of Tourism, CI

Miss Cayman Islands is a national Beauty pageant in Cayman Islands. It selects the territory's entrants in the Miss Universe, Miss World and Miss Supranational pageants.

== History ==
The Miss Cayman started in 1932, and Gleeda Coe won the first competition in the territory. The Cayman Islands rerun the traditional pageant in 1977. In that year the Cayman Islands committed to compete internationally as a territorial at Miss World. More than that the committee successfully took a right the license of Miss Universe in 1980 when Dealia Walter achieved a major award Miss Congeniality in South Korea. In 2019 the brand of Miss Cayman Islands added Universe on Miss Cayman Islands titleholder. Since then the winner is officially a representation of the country at Miss Universe pageant. Meanwhile the Miss World license handed to Miss Cayman Islands World team when the winner goes to Miss World annually.

== Titleholders ==
Year	Miss Cayman Islands	Represented
1932	Gleeda Coe	George Town
1977	Patricia Jackson-Patiño	George Town
1978	Wendy Daykin	George Town
1979	Jennifer Jackson	George Town
1980	Delia Walter	George Town
1981	Donna Myrie	George Town
1982	Maureen Lewis	George Town
1983	Effie Ebanks	George Town
1984	Thora Crighton	George Town
1985	Emily Hurlston	George Town
1986	Deborah Cridland	George Town
1987	Désirée Hunter	George Town
1988	Carol-Ann Balls	George Town
1989	Tricia Whittaker	George Town
1990	Bethea Christian	George Town
1991	Yvette Jordison	George Town
1992	Pamela Ebanks	George Town
1993	Audry Ebanks	George Town
1994	Anita Bush	George Town
1995	Tasha Ebanks	George Town
1997	Cassandra Powell	George Town
1998	Gemma McLaughlin	George Town
1999	Mona Lisa Tatum	George Town
2000	Jacqueline Bush	George Town
2001	Shannon McLean	East End
2003	Nichelle Welcome	George Town
2004	Stacey-Ann Kelly	George Town
2006	Ambuyah Ebanks	George Town
2007	Rebecca Parchment	George Town
2008	Nicosia Lawson	George Town
2010	Cristin Alexander	George Town
2011	Lindsay Japal	George Town
2015	Tonie Chisholm	North Side
2016	Monyque Brooks	George Town
2017	Anika Conolly	West Bay
2018	Caitlin Tyson	Grand Cayman
2019	Kadejah Bodden	Bodden Town
2020	Mariah Tibbetts	Bodden Town
2021	Georgina Kerford	George Town
2022	Tiffany Conolly; Dethroned	West Bay
2022	Chloe Powery-Doxey	George Town
2023	Ileann Powery	West Bay
2024	Raegan Rutty	East End
2025	Tahiti Seymour	Bodden Town
2026	Juliana Myers	West Bay

== Titleholders under Miss Cayman Islands org. ==
=== Miss Cayman Islands Universe ===
- : Declared as Winner
- : Ended as runner-up or top 5/6 qualification
- : Ended as one of the finalists or semifinalists
- : Ended as special awards winner

The winner of Miss Cayman Islands represents her country at the Miss Universe. On occasion, when the winner does not qualify (due to age) for either contest, a runner-up is sent.

Year	Miss Cayman Islands Universe	Placement at Miss Universe	Special Awards
2026	Juliana Myers	TBA
2025	Tahiti Seymour	Unplaced
2024	Raegan Rutty	Unplaced	Voice for Change (Silver Finalist)
2023	Ileann Powery	Unplaced
2022	Chloe Powery-Doxey	Unplaced
2022	Tiffany Conolly	Dethroned after facing assault charges
2021	Georgina Kerford	Unplaced
2020	Mariah Tibbetts	Unplaced
2019	Kadejah Bodden	Unplaced
2018	Caitlin Tyson	Unplaced
2017	Anika Conolly	Unplaced
2016	Monyque Brooks	Unplaced
2015	Tonie Chisholm	Unplaced
Did not compete between 2013—2014
2012	Lindsay Japal	Unplaced
2011	Cristin Alexander	Unplaced
2010	Did not compete
2009	Nicosia Lawson	Unplaced
2008	Rebecca Parchment	Unplaced
2007	Did not compete
2006	Ambuyah Ebanks	Unplaced
2005	Did not compete
2004	Stacey-Ann Kelly	Unplaced
2003	Nichelle Welcome	Unplaced
2002	Shannon McLean	Unplaced
2001	Jacqueline Bush	Unplaced
2000	Mona Lisa Tatum	Unplaced
1999	Gemma McLaughlin	Unplaced
Did not compete between 1997—1998
1996	Tasha Ebanks	Unplaced
1995	Anita Bush	Unplaced
1994	Audry Ebanks	Unplaced
1993	Pamela Ebanks	Unplaced
1992	Yvette Jordison	Unplaced
1991	Bethea Christian	Unplaced
1990	Tricia Whittaker	Unplaced
1989	Carol-Ann Balls	Unplaced
Did not compete between 1986—1988
1985	Emily Hurlston	Unplaced
1984	Thora Crighton	Unplaced
1983	Effie Ebanks	Unplaced
1982	Maureen Lewis	Unplaced	Miss Congeniality
1981	Donna Myrie	Unplaced
1980	Dealia Walter	Unplaced	Miss Congeniality

=== Miss Cayman Islands World ===
- : Declared as Winner
- : Ended as runner-up or top 5/6 qualification
- : Ended as one of the finalists or semifinalists
- : Ended as special awards winner

The winner or 1st Runner-up of Miss Cayman Islands went to Miss World. Began in 2018 the new foundation of Miss Cayman Islands World selects the winner to Miss World.

Year	Miss Cayman Islands World	Placement at Miss World	Special Awards
2026	Kristianna Gordon	TBA
2025	Jada Ramoon	Unplaced
2024	No competition held
2023	Leanni Tibbets	Unplaced
2022	Miss World 2021 was rescheduled to 16 March 2022 due to the COVID-19 pandemic outbreak in Puerto Rico, no edition started in 2022
2021	Rashana Hydes	Unplaced	Head to Head Challenge (Round 2)
2020	Due to the impact of COVID-19 pandemic, no competition held
2019	Jaci Patrick	Unplaced
2018	Kelsie Woodman-Bodden	Unplaced
2017	Kristin Amaya	Unplaced
2016	Monyque Brooks	Unplaced	Miss World Sport (Top 24)
Did not compete between 2012—2015
2011	Lindsay Japal	Unplaced	Miss World Talent (Top 20)
2010	Cristin Alexander	Unplaced
2009	Did not compete
2008	Nicosia Lawson	Unplaced	Miss World Talent (Top 18)
2007	Rebecca Parchment	Unplaced
2006	Ambuyah Ebanks	Unplaced	Miss World Sport (Top 27)
2005	Did not compete
2004	Stacy-Ann Kelly	Unplaced
2003	Nichelle Welcome	Unplaced
2002	Did not compete
2001	Shannon McLean	Unplaced
2000	Jacqueline Bush	Unplaced
1999	Mona Lisa Tatum	Unplaced
1998	Gemma McLaughlin	Unplaced
1997	Cassandra Powell	Unplaced
1996	Did not compete
1995	Tasha Ebanks	Unplaced
1994	Anita Bush	Unplaced	Miss World Caribbean
1993	Audry Ebanks	Unplaced
1992	Pamela Ebanks	Unplaced
1991	Yvette Jordison	Unplaced
1990	Bethea Christian	Unplaced
1989	Michele Garcia	Unplaced
1988	Melisa McTaggart	Unplaced
1987	Désirée Hunter	Unplaced
1986	Deborah Cridland	Unplaced
1985	Emily Hurlston	Unplaced
1984	Thora Crighton	Unplaced
1983	Effie Ebanks	Unplaced
1982	Maureen Lewis	Top 15	Miss Personality
1981	Donna Myrie	Unplaced
1980	Delia Walter	Unplaced
1979	Jennifer Jackson	Unplaced
1978	Wendy Daykin	Unplaced	Miss Personality
1977	Patricia Jackson-Patiño	Unplaced

=== Miss Cayman Islands Supranational ===
- : Declared as Winner
- : Ended as runner-up or top 5/6 qualification
- : Ended as one of the finalists or semifinalists
- : Ended as special awards winner

Year	Miss Cayman Islands Supranational	Placement at Miss Supranational	Special Awards
2024	Jaci Patrick	Unplaced
2023	Melissa Bridgemohan	Unplaced
