= Sneekes =

Sneekes is a surname. Notable people with the surname include:

- Melissa Sneekes (born 1983), Dutch beauty pageant contestant
- Richard Sneekes (born 1968), Dutch footballer
