= Kinuthia =

Kinuthia is a surname of Kenyan origin that may refer to:

- Ruth Kinuthia (born 1986), Kenya beauty pageant contestant
- Ibrahim Kinuthia (born 1963), Kenyan long-distance runner
- Kinuthia Murugu (died 2009), Kenyan politician
- Kinuthia Mathukia Dennis (born 1988), Kenyan activist
