= Miss World 2007 =

International beauty pageant

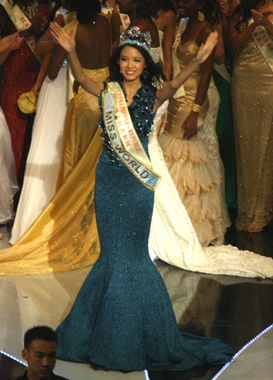
- Miss World 2007, Zhang Zilin
- Date: 1 December 2007
- Presenters: Angela Chow; Fernando Allende
- Entertainment: Duncan James; Haikou Artistic Group; The South African Mvezo Choir; No. 9 Primary School of Sanya
- Venue: Crown of Beauty Theatre, Sanya, China
- Broadcaster: Official broadcaster: SMG; International: E!; Challenge
- Entrants: 106
- Placements: 16
- Withdrawals: Barbados; Cambodia; Democratic Republic of the Congo; French Polynesia; Liberia; Malawi; Portugal; Saint Lucia; Uruguay; Zambia
- Returns: Albania; Belize; Grenada; Lithuania; Nepal; New Zealand; Paraguay; Sierra Leone; Suriname; Swaziland; Uganda
- Winner: Zhang Zilin; China

Miss World 2007 was the 57th edition of the Miss World pageant, held at the Crown of Beauty Theatre in Sanya, China, on December 1, 2007. 106 contestants competed in this edition.

At the end of the event, Taťána Kuchařová of the Czech Republic crowned Zhang Zilin of China as her successor. This is the first time China won the title of Miss World. The first and second runners-up we're Angola's Micaela Reis and Mexico's Carolina Morán.

== Background ==
The 106 contestants recorded the official torch relay anthem Light the Passion, Share the Dream for the 2008 Olympic Games as a major co-operation between the Beijing Olympic Committee and Miss World Limited. The song had its first broadcast to a global audience at the 57th Miss World final on 1 December.

In addition, to coincide with World AIDS Day, the pageant presented a special tribute to the fight against AIDS, with a televised speech from former South African President Nelson Mandela and the presence of his daughter and grandson, along with traditional dancers from South Africa who joined the contestants in a special song.

=== Returns, and, withdrawals ===
This edition saw the return of Albania, Belize, Grenada, Lithuania, Nepal, New Zealand, Paraguay, Sierra Leone, Suriname, Swaziland and Uganda; Suriname, which last competed in 1981, Sierra Leone in 1988, Grenada in 1996, Belize in 2003, Lithuania and Paraguay last competed in 2004 and Albania, Nepal, New Zealand, Swaziland and Uganda in 2005.

Barbados, Cambodia, the Democratic Republic of the Congo, French Polynesia, Liberia, Portugal, Saint Lucia, Uruguay and Zambia, withdrew from the competition.

== Results ==
=== Placements ===
Placement	Contestant
Miss World 2007	China – Zhang Zilin
1st Runner-Up	Angola – Micaela Reis
2nd Runner-Up	Mexico – Carolina Morán Gordillo
Top 5	Sweden – Annie Oliv; Trinidad and Tobago – Valene Maharaj
Top 16	Austria – Christine Reiler; Dominican Republic – Ada de la Cruz; Ecuador – Valeska Saab; Ghana – Irene Dwomoh; Grenada – Vivian Burkhardt; Hong Kong – Kayi Cheung; Jamaica – Yendi Phillips; Malaysia – Deborah Priya Henry; Puerto Rico – Jennifer Guevara; United States – Abigail McCary; Venezuela – Claudia Suárez

==== Continental Queens of Beauty ====
Continental Group	Contestant
Africa	Angola – Micaela Reis
Americas	Mexico – Carolina Moran Gordillo
Asia & Oceania	China – Zhang Zilin
Caribbean	Trinidad and Tobago – Valene Maharaj
Europe	Sweden – Annie Oliv

== Judges ==
- Julia Morley (UK) – Chairman of the Miss World Organization
- Duncan James (UK) – Member of the boy band Blue, now an actor and TV presenter
- Annabel Croft (UK) – Former tennis star and television presenter
- Ben de Lisi (Italy) – Renowned fashion designer
- Li Xiao Bai (China) – managing director of New Silk Road Modelling Agency
- Bruce Zhao (China) – Chairperson of the Huayu Group
- Makaziwe Mandela (South Africa) – Daughter of Nelson Mandela, industrialist and philanthropist
- Neal Hamil (United States) – managing director of Elite Models
- Krish Naidoo (Ireland) – Miss World International Ambassador, entrepreneur, works with many charitable organisations
- Elena Franchuk (Ukraine) – Founder of the Anti-AIDS Foundation of Ukraine

== Contestants ==
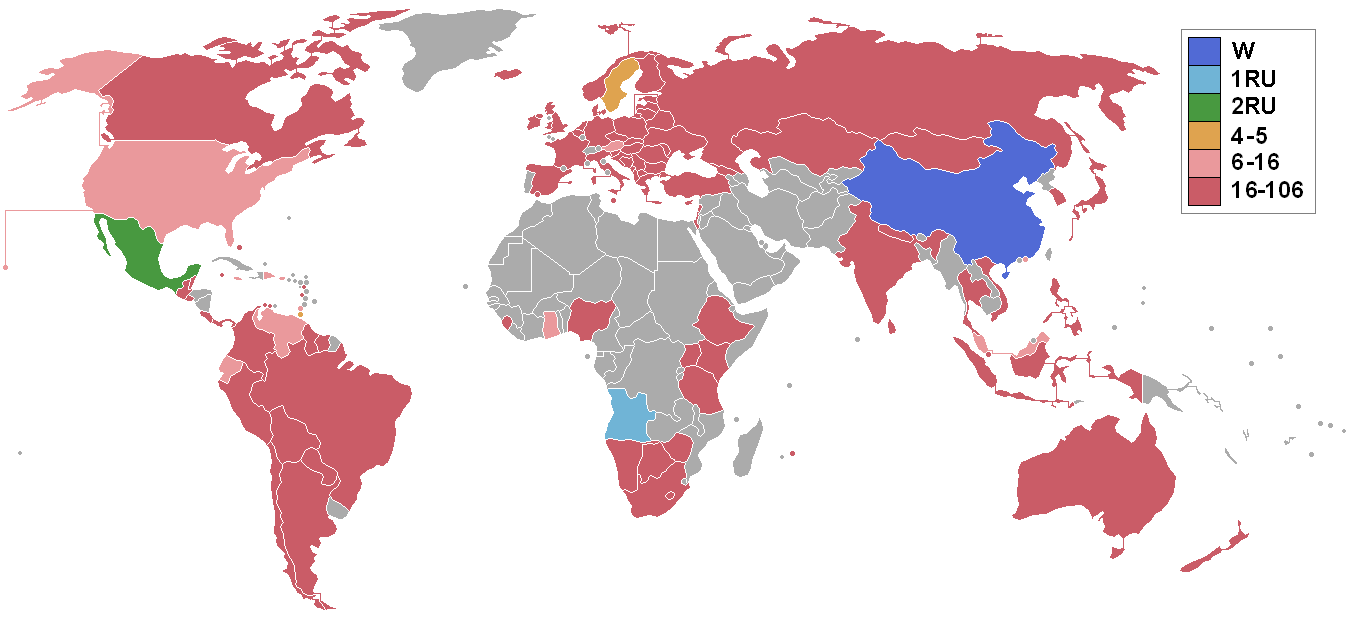
Countries and territories which sent delegates and results for Miss World 2007

106 contestants competed for the title.

Country/Territory	Contestant	Age (Note: Ages at the time of the pageant)	Hometown
Albania	Elda Dushi	18	Tirana
Angola	Micaela Reis	18	Luanda
Argentina	Alejandra Bernal	19	San Salvador de Jujuy
Aruba	Boyoura Martijn	21	Oranjestad
Australia	Caroline Pemberton	21	Sydney
Austria	Christine Reiler	25	Mödling
Bahamas	Anya Watkins	21	Nassau
Belarus	Alena Aladka	22	Minsk
Belgium	Halima Chehaima	19	Brussels
Belize	Felicita Arzú	22	Orange Walk Town
Bolivia	Sandra Hernández	22	Cochabamba
Bosnia and Herzegovina	Gordana Tomić	17	Tuzla
Botswana	Malebogo Marumoagae	24	Tonota
Brazil	Regiane Andrade	23	São Bento do Sul
Bulgaria	Paolina Racheva	19	Ruse
Canada	Sara Ghulam	18	Toronto
Cayman Islands	Rebecca Parchment	25	West Bay
Chile	Bernardita Zúñiga	24	Viña del Mar
China	Zhang Zilin	23	Shijiazhuang
Colombia	María José Torrenegra	23	Barranquilla
Costa Rica	Wendy Cordero	19	Cartago
Croatia	Tajana Jeremić	17	Vukovar
Curaçao	Mckeyla Richards	19	Willemstad
Cyprus	Dora Anastasiou	19	Xylofagou
Czech Republic	Kateřina Sokolová	18	Přerov
Denmark	Line Kruuse	25	Korsør
Dominican Republic	Ada de la Cruz	21	Santo Domingo
Ecuador	Valeska Saab	23	Guayaquil
El Salvador	Michelle Melhado	18	San Salvador
England	Georgia Horsley	20	Malton
Estonia	Kadi Sizask	21	Rapla
Ethiopia	Mihret Abebe	19	Taferi Kela
Finland	Linnea Aaltonen	19	Kauniainen
France	Rachel Legrain-Trapani	20	Picardy
Georgia	Tamar Nemsitsveridze	20	Tbilisi
Germany	Janice Behrendt	24	Cottbus
Ghana	Irene Dwomoh	21	Accra
Gibraltar	Danielle Pérez	23	Gibraltar
Greece	Aikaterini Evangelinou	19	Athens
Grenada	Vivian Burkhardt	21	St. George's
Guadeloupe	Nancy Fleurival	23	Abymes
Guatemala	Hamy Tejeda	22	Guatemala City
Guyana	Candace Charles	17	Stanleytown
Hong Kong	Kayi Cheung	23	Hong Kong
Hungary	Krisztina Bodri	21	Budapest
Iceland	Jóhanna Vala Jónsdóttir	21	Reykjavík
India	Sarah-Jane Dias	24	Mumbai
Indonesia	Kamidia Radisti	23	Surabaya
Ireland	Bláthnaid McKenna	21	Kildare
Israel	Liran Kohener	18	Rishon LeZion
Italy	Giada Wiltshire	17	Lugo
Jamaica	Yendi Phillipps	22	Kingston
Japan	Lui Watanabe	23	Tokyo
Kazakhstan	Dana Kaparova	19	Astana
Kenya	Catherine Wainaina	22	Nyandarua
Latvia	Kristīne Djadenko	23	Riga
Lebanon	Nadine Njeim	20	Beirut
Lithuania	Jurgita Jurkutė	22	Plungė
Macedonia	Jana Stojanovska	22	Skopje
Malaysia	Deborah Priya Henry	22	Kuala Lumpur
Malta	Stephanie Zammit	22	Żejtun
Martinique	Vanessa Beauchaints	22	Ducos
Mauritius	Melody Selvon	18	Bambous
Mexico	Carolina Morán Gordillo	19	Manzanillo
Moldova	Ina Codreanu	22	Chișinău
Mongolia	Gankhuyagiin Oyuungerel	22	Ulaanbaatar
Montenegro	Marija Ćirović	18	Nikšić
Namibia	Marichen Luiperth	21	Swakopmund
Nepal	Sitashma Chand	24	Kathmandu Valley
Netherlands	Melissa Sneekes	24	The Hague
New Zealand	Stephanie Dods	17	Auckland
Nigeria	Munachi Nwankwo	19	Rivers State
Northern Ireland	Melissa Patton	20	Belfast
Norway	Lisa-Mari Moen Jünge	19	Molde
Panama	Shey Ling Him	21	Penonomé
Paraguay	María de la Paz Vargas	20	Asunción
Peru	Cynthia Calderón	19	Tacna
Philippines	Maggie Wilson	18	Bacolod
Poland	Karolina Zakrzewska	21	Zielona Góra
Puerto Rico	Jennifer Guevara	20	San Juan
Romania	Elena Roxana Azoitei	19	Constanța
Russia	Tatiana Kotova	22	Moscow
Scotland	Nieve Jennings	20	Glasgow
Serbia	Mirjana Božović	20	Lajkovac
Sierra Leone	Fatmata Turay	20	Freetown
Singapore	Roshni Kaur Soin	21	Singapore
Slovakia	Veronika Husárová	20	Komárno
Slovenia	Tadeja Ternar	20	Beltinci
South Africa	Megan Coleman	22	KwaZulu-Natal
South Korea (Note: Competed as Korea in the pageant)	Cho Eun-ju	24	Busan
Spain	Natalia Zabala	24	San Sebastián
Sri Lanka	Maria Colombage	23	Colombo
Suriname	Charisse Melany Moll	22	Paramaribo
Swaziland	Nkosing'phile Dlamini	22	Manzini
Sweden	Annie Oliv	20	Gothenburg
Tanzania	Richa Adhia	19	Mwanza
Thailand	Kanokkorn Jaicheun	21	Bangkok
Trinidad and Tobago	Valene Maharaj	21	Santa Margarita
Turkey	Selen Soyder	20	İzmir
Uganda	Monica Kasyate	21	Kampala
Ukraine	Lika Roman	22	Uzhhorod
United States	Abigail McCary	25	Denver
Venezuela	Claudia Suárez	20	Caracas
Vietnam	Đặng Minh Thu	19	Hanoi
Wales	Kelly-Louise Pesticcio	23	St Mellons
Zimbabwe	Caroline Marufu	24	Bulawayo

== Notes ==
=== Replacements ===
- Albania – The Miss & Mister Albania organisation replaced Egla Harxhi, Miss Albania 2007, with Elda Dushi, for unknown reasons.
- Belarus – Miss Belarus 2006 1st Runner-up, Yulia Sindzeyeva, was supposed to compete in Miss World; however, she attended the Miss International contest in Japan, where she became 2nd runner-up. A contract with the Japanese organisation prevents her from attending the Miss World contest. 2nd runner-up, Alena Aladka, took her place.
- Curaçao – Lisaika Everitz, Miss World Curaçao, was not accepted as Curaçao's entry to Miss World 2007 for not meeting the age requirements. She was replaced with Naemi Monte. Since Monte did not turn in the official application to the national organisation before the deadline established by Miss World Ltd, the franchiseholder appointed a new delegate: Mckeyla Richards. After this action, Naemi Monte decided to file a lawsuit against the franchiseholder, Reprod, to regain the right to represent the island at the international pageant. On 17 October, a jury decided in favour of Reprod, ending the dispute between both.
- Latvia – Ina Avlasēviča, Miss Latvia 2006, competed in Miss World 2008. The organisation sent Kristīne Djadenko, a former Miss Latvia, to that year's pageant.
- Vietnam – Miss Sea 2007 as well as Miss Vietnam World 2007's 2nd Runner-up Đặng Minh Thu was named by Elite Vietnam as the country's candidate at Miss World 2007. They Earlier offered Miss World's ticket to Miss Vietnam World 2007 Ngô Phương Lan, who turned it down to focus on her studies in Switzerland and Teresa Sam, 1st Runner-up.

=== Withdrawals ===
- Barbados – Natalie Griffith
- Guernsey – Hannah McLaughlin
- Malawi – Peth Msinska
- Switzerland – Amanda Ammann. She competed in Miss Universe 2008 and was unplaced. Apparently the Miss Switzerland organization gave up their Miss World licence that year.
- (Chinese Taipei) Taiwan – Yen Chin Li
- United States Virgin Islands – Esonica Veira She participated 4 years later at Miss World 2011, where she became Top 15

=== No shows ===
- Antigua & Barbuda
- Cambodia
- Democratic Republic of the Congo
- Egypt
- Honduras
- Liberia – The Miss Liberia 2007/2008 is scheduled for 23 November 2007, just one week before the Miss World 2007 finals takes place.
- Nicaragua
- Portugal
- Republic of the Congo – Pupuce Ngalla Ibata, national director of Miss Congo (COMICO) was informed that Congo will not take part in Miss World 2007. The reason being because the Miss World Organization never replied to their application for the franchise. However, she will try to get the franchise next year.
- Saint Lucia – Yasmin Walcott, national director of Miss Saint Lucia World, was informed that the island won't be represented in Miss World 2007.
- Sint Maarten – Fabiana Arnell, national director of Sint Maarten Queen's competition has informed that reports about Shanyra Richardson's participation in Miss World are not true, but she is interested in taking part in future Miss World competitions.
- Tahiti
- Uruguay
- Zambia
