= Aikaterini Evangelinou =

Greek model (born 1988)

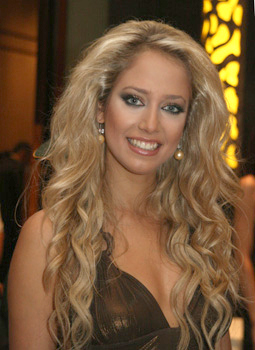
- Aikaterini Evangelinou during Miss World
- Born: Aikaterini Evangelinou; 1988 (age 37–38); Athens, Greece
- Beauty pageant titleholder
- Title: Miss Greece 2007

Aikaterini Evangelinou (born 1988) is a Greek model and beauty pageant titleholder who represented Greece at Miss World 2007 in China. She works as a model and is pursuing a degree to become a dietitian.
