= Christa Simmons =

Guyanese beauty pageant contestant

- Born: Christa Simmons; 1985 (age 40–41); Georgetown, Guyana
- Beauty pageant titleholder
- Title: Miss Guyana 2008

Christa Simmons is a Guyanese model and beauty pageant titleholder who was crowned Miss Guyana 2008 and went on to represent Guyana in the Miss World 2008 pageant in South Africa. She has a degree in sociology and has studied law.
