= Gabrielle Walcott =

Trinidadian artist, model and beauty pageant titleholder

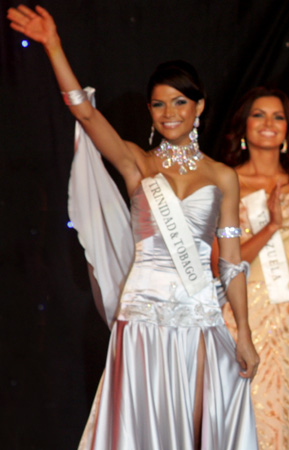
- Walcott in 2008
- Born: Gabrielle Walcott; 26 June 1984 (age 42); Port of Spain, Trinidad and Tobago
- Height: 1.73 m (5 ft 8 in)
- Beauty pageant titleholder
- Title: Miss Trinidad and Tobago World 2008; Miss World Caribbean 2008; Miss Trinidad and Tobago Universe 2011
- Hair color: Black
- Eye color: Hazel
- Major competitions: Miss World 2008; (2nd Runner-Up); Miss Universe 2011; (Unplaced)

Gabrielle Walcott (born 26 June 1984) is a Trinidadian artist, model, charity worker and beauty pageant titleholder who won Miss Trinidad and Tobago 2008 and placed as the second runner-up in Miss World 2008.

She is also titleholder of Miss World Beauty with a Purpose 2008, Miss World Caribbean 2008, and Miss Trinidad and Tobago Universe 2011. She represented Trinidad and Tobago at the Miss Universe 2011 pageant in São Paulo but was unplaced. Gabrielle resides in Petit Valley, Port of Spain, Trinidad and Tobago. She is of mixed Carib, Indian, Portuguese, Chinese and English descent.

== Early life ==
Walcott was born in Port of Spain on 26 June 1984. She is the oldest of three siblings: Heidi, Joshua and Sophie Walcott. She attended St. Bernadette's Primary School, Providence Girls' Secondary School, the University of the West Indies School of Continuing Studies, the University of the West Indies and later pursued acting and theatre arts at HB Studios in New York City, United States. She is a professionally trained model but is not signed to any modelling agencies.

An experienced equestrian show jumper, Walcott also took up hobbies such as dance, yoga, Pilates, photography, hockey, and art and enjoys acting and theatre. She is a long-time member and supporter of the Trinidad and Tobago Society for Prevention of Cruelty to Animals (the TTSPCA).

== Acting and production work ==
Walcott was the female lead in the 2005 music video "Wanna Love U Girl" by Robin Thicke, directed by Hype Williams, and in the 2004 “Tempted to Touch” video also produced by Hype Williams for Barbadian soca artist Rupee. She is credited as an extra in the 2006 movie Backlash and the 2010 Norwegian film "Limbo." Her other production credits include Set Artist for Real World/Road Rules Challenge: The Gauntlet in 2005 and as wardrobe supervisor for Backlash in 2008.

== Miss World 2008 ==
Walcott was the 2008 entrant into the Miss World pageant. She placed as the second runner-up to Ksenia Sukhinova of Russia. She won the titles of Miss World Caribbean 2008 for getting the highest placement of the Caribbean delegates; and Miss World Beauty with a Purpose 2008 for working with the Just Because Foundation dedicated to creating hospitable conditions for children with cancer and helping raise $100,000 in charity for the creation of a new ward for these children. Overall she placed in all the fast track events.

== Miss Universe 2011 ==
In 2011, Walcott participated in the Miss Trinidad and Tobago Universe Pageant. As a highly rated participant, she won the crown and represented her island nation in the Miss Universe 2011 Pageant held in São Paulo, Brazil on 12 September 2011.

== Charity work and social groups ==
Walcott works with the Just Because Foundation, a non-profit community-based organization founded by Chevaughn Joseph and Noel Joseph in honor of their son Jabez "JB" Joseph, who died from a rare form of cancer. The JBF provides practical and emotional support for parents and siblings of children with cancer.

She has worked with Miss Trinidad and Tobago Universe Anya Ayoung-Chee with the TallMan Foundation. The Foundation was established for the empowerment of young people in underprivileged areas.

In 2008 the United Nations Association of Trinidad and Tobago (UNATT) asked both Walcott and Anya Ayoung-Chee to be spokeswomen for the group. Both women accepted and now remain members of the advocacy group. UNATT the NGO arm of the United Nations which aims to advocate the United Nations and the Millennium Development Goals through their demographic and age group. Walcott has been an active supporter of the organization and was the facilitator of a 2008 workshop which brought together various stakeholders across the country to a discourse on the state of the Millennium Development Goals in Trinidad and Tobago with a focus on youth.

Preceded by Valene Maharaj	Miss World Trinidad and Tobago; 2008	Succeeded by Ashanna Arthur
Preceded by Kayi Cheung / Valeska Saab	Miss World Beauty With A Purpose; 2008	Succeeded by Pooja Chopra
Preceded by Valene Maharaj	Miss World Caribbean; 2008	Succeeded by Leah Marville
Preceded by (Mexico) Carolina Moran Gordillo	Miss World (2nd Runner-Up); 2008	Succeeded by (South Africa) Tatum Keshwar
