= Rebecca Parchment =

Miss Cayman Islands 2007, contestant in Miss Universe 2008 and Miss World 2007

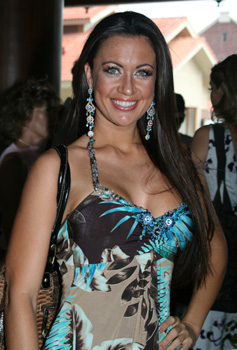
- Born: Rebecca Parchment; 1982 (age 43–44); George Town, Cayman Islands
- Beauty pageant titleholder
- Title: Miss Cayman Islands 2007
- Major competitions: Miss World 2007; Miss Universe 2008

Rebecca Parchment is a Caymanian model and beauty pageant titleholder who represented Cayman Islands at Miss World 2007 and Miss Universe 2008.

== Early life ==
Parchment graduated from the University of Central Florida with a Bachelor's degree in Business Administration and also majored in Marketing.

== Pageants ==
Parchment is the only delegate who participated at both Miss World 2007 and Miss Universe 2008, and is one of the oldest contestants who took part in both competitions.

Parchment sang and helped assist Mandla Mandela and a children's choir from South Africa on World AIDS Day during the Miss World 2007 pageant won by Zhang Zilin.

In August 2008 she passed on her Miss Cayman Islands crown to Nicosia Lawson.

Awards and achievements
Preceded by Ambuyah Ebanks	Miss Cayman Islands; 2007	Succeeded by Nicosia Lawson
