= Leah Marville =

Barbadian television personality (born 1985)

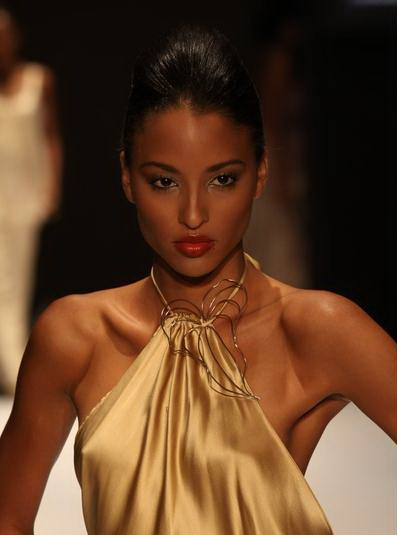
- Born: Leah Janine Marville; 13 November 1985 (age 39); Saint Michael, Barbados
- Education: Bachelor of Law (UWI) LLB (Hns)
- Occupation(s): Television producer, model, attorney, TV host, actress, businesswoman
- Height: 1.73 m (5 ft 8 in)
- Beauty pageant titleholder
- Title: Miss Barbados World 2009; Miss Caribbean 2009
- Hair color: Black
- Eye color: Brown
- Website: www.leahmarville.com

Leah Janine Marville (born 13 November 1985) is a Barbadian TV Host, model and beauty pageant titleholder who won Miss Barbados World 2009.

Born and raised in Barbados, Marville started her international career after being spotted at Barbados Fashion Week (2006) by Dwight Peters. Marville was encouraged to participate in the Fashion Face of the Caribbean competition in Jamaica, where she came third. Recommended by international pageant scouts, Marville was flown to New York to develop her portfolio. She was first signed internationally to South African agency Base Model Management and German model agency East West Models. Marville is signed to RED model management in New York.

Marville is a former host on Splash, a Caribbean lifestyle series on Black Entertainment Television (BET) sister network Centric.

== Biography ==
=== Childhood and education ===
Marville attended Erdiston Primary school and Queen's College. She went on to study law at the University of the West Indies, Cave Hill campus, Barbados. She received her Bachelor of Laws with honours in 2007. She completed her Legal Education Certificate at the Hugh Wooding Law School in Trinidad in August 2012. She has interned at a prominent entertainment law firm, Gordon-McGrath in Jamaica, and had oversight responsibilities for high-profile clients such as Beenie Man and family members of the late Reggae icon Bob Marley. Marville was also employed at the Jamaica Human Rights Council, where she was responsible for overseeing the human rights of death row inmates throughout prisons in Kingston, Jamaica.

While at Queens college she briefly served on her school's Cadet programme where her cousin Shontelle, who is signed to Street Records Corporation/Universal Motown Records was her drill sergeant.

=== Career ===
Marville started modeling professionally in 2008 in Cape Town, South Africa for Base Model Management.

Marville has participated in several Caribbean fashion weeks: Barbados Fashion Week, Style Week Jamaica, Saint Kitts fashion weekend, Guyana Fashion week, Dominicana Moda, and Fashion Week Trinidad and Tobago. On 24 October 2010, Marville was given the award for Top Caribbean Female model, at the Caribbean fashion awards. Her tenth anniversary She magazine cover, was also awarded best Caribbean magazine cover for 2010.

In 2011, Marville signed on as the face and spokesmodel for the inaugural staging of Caribbean International Fashion Week.

=== Television ===
In 2006, Marville attended the BET Awards where she met with executive producers for the BET J Caribbean music show Wicked Style. In 2008, she secured a place on the show as a guest host, and by 2009 she was promoted to the main host and co-produced the Barbados and Jamaican episodes.

In 2009, Marville produced her own lifestyle reality show, Passport 246 in partnership with Mykal Cushnie of DSE Media in Jamaica. In 2010 she launched the second season Passport246: Journey to Miss World. This series was later syndicated on Tempo Networks in July 2011 In 2010, she joined the cast of Splash!, with Tamara Ennis and Crystal Cunningham, on a lifestyle Caribbean show on Centric. In 2011, she was retained for the second season of Splash on Centric.

=== Journalism ===
Leah Marville is a freelance journalist for The Daily Nation newspaper, The Barbados Advocate, and the Jamaican Gleaner Company newspaper. In June 2009, Marville secured an exclusive interview feature with Larry Nimmer, about his documentary, Michael Jackson: The Untold Story of Never Land. The interview later aired on Television Jamaica (TVJ) and on CBC TV 8 Barbados.

== Miss Barbados World ==
On 3 October 2009, she was crowned Miss Barbados World 2009, and represented her country at the 59th staging of the Miss World pageant, hosted in Johannesburg South Africa where Miss World Kaiane Aldorino was the winner. At the Miss Barbados pageant, Marville won two fast track events: "Most Photogenic" and "Beauty with a Purpose".

At Miss World 2009, Marville won the "Continental Queen of Beauty" award for being the highest placed Caribbean delegate. Her Love Campaign won second place for the Miss World Beauty with a Purpose fast track category. The Love Campaign was entered as Leah's "Beauty with a Purpose" project for the Miss Barbados World competition and received an award from the HIV Commission of Barbados and the HIV Food Bank.

In April 2011, Stephanie Chase-Yates, former Miss Barbados World 2001 and CEO of SFC International, handed over the Miss Barbados World franchise to Marville Management, which is owned and operated by Leah Marville.

== Philanthropy ==
Marville's humanitarian efforts began in 2007, when she hosted a charity walkathon dubbed "Fashion with a Mission". The charity benefited several children who had lost their families in accidents. The funds were donated to the Barbados Media Disaster Relief Fund. Through corporate and public donations, the fund went on to generate over five hundred thousand Barbadian dollars.

Founded in March 2009, The Love Campaign, as conceived by Marville, aimed to regenerate a culture of giving and awareness in Barbados and to encourage people to abandon the HIV social stigma.

The campaign was officially endorsed by the former Prime Minister of Barbados David Thompson, the Ministry of Health, and the Ministry of Youth, Sports and Culture.

The Love Campaign partnered with Barbadian designer Toni Thorne in 2009, to launch the "Martha's Smile" campaign in Jamaica. Donations from the partnership went towards the rebuilding fund for Martha's Home, a hospice for abandoned children living with HIV/AIDS, after it had been destroyed by an electrical fire By October 2010, the campaign has raised more than US$70,000.

In 2010, Marville launched Love Campaign School Tour, which delivered the message of healthy lifestyles to children at several secondary schools under the banner "respect yaself". The Love Campaign won second place at the 2009 Miss World "Beauty with a Purpose" competition. The campaign has earned Marville several local awards, including two national youth awards: the Bayan Award and the Humanitarian Award; and the Phenomenal Woman award presented by the Girlfriends Foundation in the category of philanthropy.

Preceded by (Trinidad and Tobago) Gabrielle Walcott	Miss World Caribbean; 2009	Succeeded by (Saint Lucia) Aiasha Gustave
