= Miss World Italy 2018 =

- Date: June 10, 2018
- Presenters: Stefano De Martino; Laura Brioschi
- Entertainment: The Bootle´s; Matthew Lee
- Venue: Teatro Italia - Gallipoli, Gallipoli, Italy
- Broadcaster: Jo Tv
- Entrants: 50
- Placements: 20
- Winner: Nunzia Amato; Campania

Miss Mondo Italia 2018, the 13th Miss Mondo Italia pageant, was held in the Teatro Italia, Gallipoli. Conny Notarstefano of Apulia crowned her successor Nunzia Amato of Campania at the end of the event. 50 contestants competed for the crown.

== Placements ==
Results	Contestant
Miss World Italy 2018	Campania - Nunzia Amato
Runner-Up	Emilia-Romagna - Veronica Avanzolini
Top 5	Emilia-Romagna - Aylin Nica; Lazio - Erica De Matteis; Veneto - Wei Wei Lin
Top 10	Friuli-Venezia Giulia - Cler Bosco; Piedmont - Erica Bruna §; Apulia - Cosmary Fasanelli §; Sicily - Marika Pandolfo §; Veneto - Pamela Valle §
Top 20	Basilicata - Floriana Russo; Campania - Erika Lamberti; Campania - Roberto Di Lorenzo; Lazio - Melania Ciano; Liguria - Francesca Licini; Sicily - Jessica Ienna; (Trentino-Alto Adige/Südtirol) Trentino-Alto Adige - Rachele Dorigoni; (Trentino-Alto Adige/Südtirol) Trentino-Alto Adige - Araceli Auer; Veneto - Giulia Mazzon; Veneto - Valeria Faccin

§ – Qualified to the Top 20 via the Fast Track events.

== Fast Track Events ==
Winners of Fast Track events became the semifinalists of Miss World Italy 2018

Fast Track Events	Winners
Miss Sport	Veneto - Pamela Valle
Miss Model	Piedmont - Erica Bruna
Miss Beauty Beach	Sicily - Marika Pandolfo
Miss Talent	Apulia - Cosmary Fasanelli

== Special awards ==
Special Awards	Winners
Miss Vitality's	Emilia-Romagna - Aylin Nica
Miss Gilcagne´	Veneto - Wei Wei Lin
La Miss del Web by Agricola	Campania - Roberto Di Lorenzo
Miss Social Urbanart	Sicily - Jessica Ienna
Miss Caroli Hotels	Tuscany - Alice Quattrini
Miss Lastampa.It	Umbria - Alessandra Tassi
Miss Mondo Cinema	Veneto - Beatrice Gasparini

== Contestants ==
All 50 delegates have been confirmed:

No.	Representing	Name	Age	Hometown
1	Campania	Roberto Di Lorenzo		
2	Veneto	Pamela Valle	20	Thiene
3	Sicily	Agata Bongiovanni		Siracusa
4	Umbria	Vittoria Colicchio	20	Cesena
5	Tuscany	Alice Quattrini	17	Pisa
6	(Trentino-Alto Adige/Südtirol) Trentino-Alto Adige	Araceli Auer	17	Lagundo
7	Emilia-Romagna	Aylin Nica		
8	Veneto	Wei Wei Lin	17	Montebelluna
9	Calabria	Francesca Mandarano		
10	(Trentino-Alto Adige/Südtirol) Trentino-Alto Adige	Emily de Nando	21	
11	Campania	Erika Lamberti		
12	Basilicata	Floriana Russo		
13	Emilia-Romagna	Marialaura de Vitis		
14	Apulia	Cosmary Fasanelli	17	Brindisi
15	Friuli-Venezia Giulia	Cler Bosco	20	Trieste
16	Lazio	Erica de Matteis		
17	Sicily	Marika Sette	17	Patti
18	Basilicata	Emilia Paolicelli		
19	Sicily	Marika Pandolfo	22	Nicosia
20	Piedmont	Erica Bruna	24	Villafranca Piemonte
21	Umbria	Alessandra Tassi	22	Fossato di Vico
22	Lazio	Melania Ciano		
23	Emilia-Romagna	Fabiana Mondo		
24	Campania	Nunzia Amato	21	San Gennaro Vesuviano
25	Liguria	Francesca Licini		Genoa
26	Emilia-Romagna	Elis Mati		
27	Veneto	Giulia Mazzon		
28	Veneto	Valeria Faccin	21	Montebello Vicentino
29	Sicily	Angela Sette	17	Patti
30	Basilicata	Rosa Fariello		
31	Sicily	Jessica Ienna	25	Palermo
32	(Trentino-Alto Adige/Südtirol) Trentino-Alto Adige	Rachele Dorigoni	20	
33	Campania	Francesca Giordano		
34	Emilia-Romagna	Veronica Avanzolini		Bologna
35	(Trentino-Alto Adige/Südtirol) Trentino-Alto Adige	Giada Angeli	17	Pergine Valsugana
36	Sardinia	Naomi Loi		Olbia
37	Abruzzo	Iris Habazaj	17	L'Aquila
38	Emilia-Romagna	Virginia Avanzolini		
39	Veneto	Irene Bevilacqua	17	San Giovanni Ilarione
40	Calabria	Fatima Ounnas		
41	Campania	Maria Moretti		
42	Piedmont	Noemi Di Deco		
43	Calabria	Laura Bauleo		
44	Veneto	Beatrice Gasparini	17	Trebaseleghe
45	Piedmont	Martina Mirandola		
46	Lazio	Valentina Pesaresi		
47	Umbria	Asia Carrazza	17	Città di Castello
48	Lazio	Angelica Persichini		
49	Campania	Morena Pappalardo		Salerno
50	Lombardy	Marialaura Caccia	19	Busto Arsizio
