= Halima Chehaima =

Belgian beauty queen

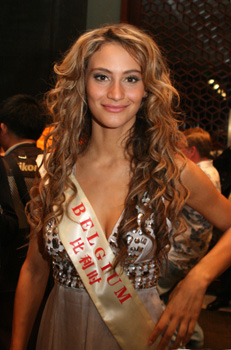
- Halima during Miss World 2007
- Born: Halima Chehaima; 1988 (age 37–38); Brussels, Belgium
- Beauty pageant titleholder
- Title: Miss Belgium 2007 (1st runner-up)

Halima Chehaima is a Belgian beauty pageant titleholder who won the title of Miss Belgium 2007. She also won the Miss International Tourism contest in 2007 in Portugal and represented Belgium in Miss World 2007 in China.

In November 2006 the pageant's steering committee came to Chehaima's defense after it was suggested she had dangerous acquaintances.

== Personal life ==
She was born to a Moroccan father and a Belgian (Flemish) mother.
