= Mykal Cushnie =

Jamaican film director, producer, & editor (born 1980)

- Born: Michael Edward Cushnie; 28 December 1980 (age 45); Kingston, Jamaica
- Education: Wolmer's Schools for Boy's, Kingston Technical; University of Technology; New York Film Academy
- Occupations: Film director, cinematography, editor
- Years active: 2003–present

Michael Edward Cushnie (born 28 December 1980), also known as Mykal Cushnie, is a Jamaican film director, film producer and editor. He is most recognized for his work on Magnum Kings and Queens of Dancehall - the Jamaican dancehall version of American Idol, The Wray & Nephew Contender - The Jamaican version of Mark Burnett's original boxing reality series The Contender, and Mission Catwalk- The Jamaican version of Project Runway. He is the CEO of DSE Media and founder of Edward Cushnie Films.

== Early life ==
Cushnie was born at The University of the West Indies Hospital in Kingston, Jamaica, to mother Beverline and father Albert, and is the youngest of three children. He attended the Wolmer's Schools for Boys, and went on to pursue a course in engineering at the University of Technology, Jamaica, before dropping out to pursue his passion of story telling and television.

== Career ==
After dropping out of University, Cushnie interned at Jamaican cable station Hype TV where he tried his at hand at directing, filming, and editing. This piqued his interest as a director, which led to him directing a few music videos for Jamaican reggae-dancehall acts such as Capleton, Richie Spice, & I-Wayne under the tutelage of established directors Delano Forbes of Phase Three, and Asha Michael. In pursuit of becoming certified, Cushnie enrolled at The New York Film Academy where he studied film and script writing. In 2007, he returned to Hype Tv for a short stint, before deciding to form his own company DSE Media, an acronym for Direct. Shoot. Edit.

DSE media, is considered one of Jamaica's leading post production houses, and was founded with the vision of creating a complete production facility, where an idea could be developed from start to finish. DSE Media produces and offering post production services for commercials, music videos, reality TV series, short films and documentaries. One of the companies most recognizable commercials, so-called behind the scenes features, was for the Jamaica Tourist Board's Project Gold, which featured Usain Bolt in a series of Jamaican advertisements. Under the DSE Media banner, he also founded Edward Cushnie Films, which is intended to develop, expose and train youths in post production and filming.

=== Film ===
In 2007, Cushnie worked on two Jamaican movie projects for FireFly Films. The first was Betta Mus Come, where Cushnie was a camera operator under the direction of Jamaican film director Storm Saulter, and for the second film Candy Shop, where he retained the role of assistant director.

=== TV series ===
His passion for telling stories would pay off, when DSE Media partnered with College Lifestyle magazine to create and produce the College Lifestyle TV series. This would lead to DSE media being hired for post production services for Barbadian international model and BET host, Leah Marville's reality series Passport 246. However, it would be Cushnie's work with the Irish-born, Jamaican producer Mark Kenny, that would establish DSE Media, and Cushnie, as one of Jamaica's premiere post production facilities. Cushnie's work on reality series The Wray & Nephew Contender and Magnum Kings and Queens of Dancehall, resonated throughout the industry after both shows shot to local popularity. In 2011, Cushnie used his creative direction and post production services on the Jamaican reality series Mission Catwalk, which was fashioned from Project Runway.

In 2010, in partnership with Jamaica producer Kibwe McGann, Cushnie directed and shared executive producer responsibilities on BET-Centric's lifestyle series SPLASH! which, in 2011, was commissioned to produce a second season.

=== Documentaries ===
In 2009, Cushnie was invited by Kimala Bennett to supervise post production on her social documentary Combing through the Roots: Politics of black hair in Jamaica. In the same year, Guyanese attorney and film director Dr Claimont Chung chose DSE Media for W.A.R. Stories, a documentary on the life of the historian, author and activist, Walter Rodney. The documentary was screened at the University of the West Indies, Jamaica and at the Reggae Film Festival in late 2009 and, by January 2010, the documentary debuted in New York and in February at the University of Dar es Salaam in Tanzania, Africa.

In August 2012, Cushnie left Jamaica for Africa with Donisha Prendergsat - granddaughter of Bob Marley - and reggae singer Kelissa McDonald, to film his new documentary, 50 Days in Afrika. The documentary was filmed in 50 days and journeyed across five African countries: Egypt, Ethiopia, Ghana, Nigeria and South Africa. The documentary highlighted Africa's contribution to the global film industry. The name of the documentary 50 Days in Afrika is also significant, as it was coined to recognize Jamaica's 50th celebration of independence from slavery and British rule.

=== Music videos ===
Cushnie first started music videos while working at Hype TV. While there he worked alongside established Jamaican directors such a Ras Kassa, Ras Tingle, Jay Will and Kimala Bennett. Since branching out to open DSE Media, he has worked on video projects for some of reggae and dancehall's biggest acts such as: Stephen Marley, Damian Marley, Etana, I Wayne, Busy Signal, Jah Cure, Sean Paul, Tami Chynn and Floyd West. Cushnie's most successful videos include the Ras Kassa's "Tic Toc", which was Busy Signal/VP Records nominated video of the year, and The Matrimoney movie video, featuring Sean Paul, Tami Chynn, Lady Saw, Fambo, DJ liquid, Tifa and Wayne Marshall, considered to be the new standard by which Jamaican music medley's are judged.
