= American International School Hong Kong =

International school in Hong Kong

American International School
- 美國國際學校

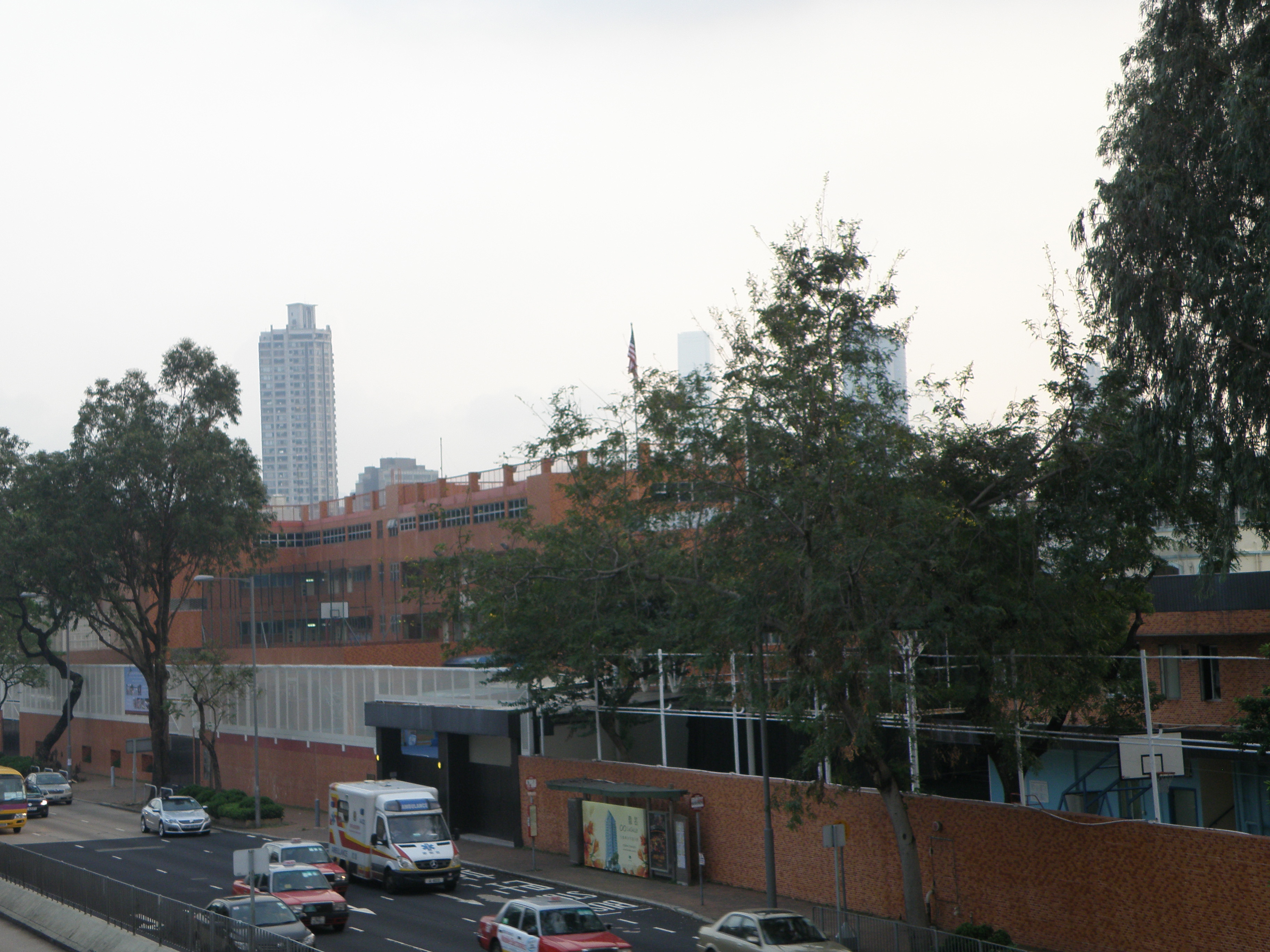

Location
- 125 Waterloo Road, Kowloon Tong, Kowloon; Hong Kong
- Coordinates: 22.33139°N 114.17832850000002°E

Information
- Type: Private and independent
- Motto: None
- Established: 1986
- Head of school: Anita Simpson
- Grades: Early childhood to Grade 12
- Average class size: 20
- Website: http://www.ais.edu.hk/

American International School Hong Kong
- Traditional Chinese: 美國國際學校
- Simplified Chinese: 美国国际学校
Transcriptions
Standard Mandarin
- Hanyu Pinyin: Měiguó Guójì Xuéxiào
Yue: Cantonese
- Jyutping: mei5 gwok3 gwok3 zai3 hok6 haau6

The American International School (AIS; Chinese: 美國國際學校) is a private, independent, international school in Hong Kong founded in 1986. It delivers US standards-based educational program for students from early childhood through grade 12. AIS is accredited by the Western Association of Schools and Colleges (WASC), one of the six regional accrediting associations in the United States. It is also a member of the East Asian Regional Council of Schools, the College Board, and an international member of the National Association of Independent Schools.

It is in Kowloon City District.

== History ==
The American International School was founded as the California International School in 1986. It initially enrolled 50 students. It changed its status to a not-for-profit school and was renamed American International School in 1996. The school has less than 40 nationalities represented. As of August 2014, AIS enrols approximately 845 students and employs 90 faculty and staff.

The campus is located on 117–131 Waterloo Road in Kowloon Tong. At high school level, students pursue the Advanced Placement Examinations and the AIS High School Diploma.

In recent years, the AIS has undertaken campus redevelopment projects. In the spring of 2005, Phase 1 of the new high school campus was finished, followed two years later with the completion of Phase 1, consisting of a high school building. The new elementary school building includes a small volleyball court and rooftop basketball court, and was completed and inaugurated in February 2011. A new early childhood centre on 131 Waterloo Road for the 3–5 years old was opened in August 2013. Since March 2018, all classrooms have boards.

The school celebrated its Silver Jubilee 25th anniversary in 2010–2011 with a gala at the Hong Kong Jockey Club ballroom.

== Structure ==
The school is divided into three sections, all coeducational: elementary school (early childhood 1 and 2, grade 1 Junior, grade 1–4), middle school (grade 5–8), and high school (grade 9–12). Each section of the school has its own principal and administration, while the entire school is overseen by the Head of School.

The High School Student Council (SC) represents the student body. It is an elected group, in which each grade 9-12 homeroom selects one member, and leadership positions are elected within the council. The SC meets regularly with a faculty advisor to address student concerns and issues.

AIS has created house activities, causing rivalries in the school in competing in sports-based and academic-based activities. Before the 2003–2004 year, AIS had four houses determined by colour. After 2004, the school began to make changes to the house system based on homerooms in grades. The house system was changed into three competitive houses with animals and colours coming from the school emblem, as well as the flag of the United States. The three houses are the Blue Dragons, the White Tigers, and the Red Phoenix.

== Academics ==
High school students attend four academic years and must earn a minimum of 24 Carnegie Credit Units to graduate with an AIS High School Diploma. AIS students are actively involved in a wide range of extra-curricular activities. The school offers an extensive range of opportunities including seasonal inter-mural and varsity sports, visual and performing arts, and special interest clubs including Model United Nations, Global Issues and student government. Every year, the standardised Iowa Tests of Basic Skills are taken by all students from Grade 3 through Grade 11 in early spring. Advanced Placement (AP) examinations take place in May. Academic progress is reported formally each trimester when report cards and progress report cards are issued. AIS is an approved SAT Test Centre allowing AIS high school students to take the SAT test on campus.

== Notable alumni ==
- Stephanie Che, actress and singer
- Angel Lam, composer for Yo-Yo Ma, nominee for the 2011 Grammy for Best Classical Crossover Album Award
- Denise Yeung, a racing driver in the Asia Pacific Region from Hong Kong.
- Yvette Kong Man-yi, Hong Kong swimming athlete, and participant in the 2016 Rio Olympics
- Edelweiss Cheung, Miss Hong Kong 2008
- Dorian Ho, fashion designer
- Teddy Lo, Hong Kong based LED artist, prominent for tech-scene works.
- Yancy Chu Man Yan, Hong Kong TV and online broadcasting anchor
- Daniel Chan, Hong Kong pop singer and actor
- Jackson Wang, former athlete of the Hong Kong National Fencing Team and member of South Korean boy group, GOT7, and a soloist

== See also ==
- Americans in China
