= Stephanie Zammit =

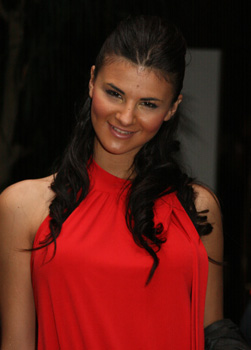
- Stephanie during Miss World 2007
- Born: Stephanie Zammit; 1985 (age 40–41); Zejtun, Malta
- Beauty pageant titleholder
- Title: Miss Malta 2007

Stephanie Zammit is a Maltese teacher, model and beauty pageant titleholder who was crowned Miss World Malta 2007 and represented Malta at the Miss World 2007 beauty pageant.

== Pageantry and modeling ==
Zammit began modeling in 2004, and by 2007 had modeled with Modelle International.

During the Miss World Malta 2007 competition, Zammit was a finalist in the Beach Babe contest. She was crowned Miss World Malta 2007 in July 2007, and went on to represent Malta in China at Miss World 2007 in late 2007.

== Personal life ==
Zammit is from Zejtun.

According to Zammit, she has a Bachelor's degree in Education and is a qualified teacher of English and Home Economics. In 2007, she was an English teacher at St Benedict's College in Kirkop.
