= Cynthia Muvirimi =

Zimbabwean-born model (born 1983)

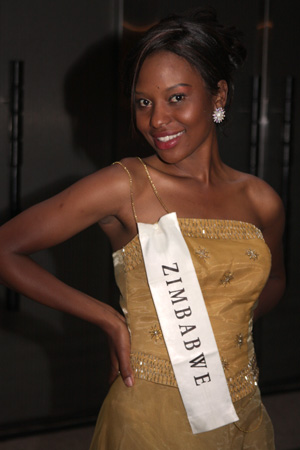
- Cynthia Muvirimi
- Born: Cynthia Maideyi Muvirimi; 1983; Harare, Zimbabwe
- Height: 1.73 m (5 ft 8 in)
- Beauty pageant titleholder
- Title: (Miss Tourism Zimbabwe 2007); Miss Global International 2007
- Hair color: Black
- Eye color: Black

Cynthia Maideyi Muvirimi is a Zimbabwean model and beauty pageant titleholder who represented Zimbabwe in the Miss World 2008 pageant.

== Early life ==
The twelfth of thirteen children, Muvirimi was born in Harare. She attended Cecil John Rhodes Junior School and went on to Thornhill High School, both in Gweru, Zimbabwe. Muvirimi received a diploma in Nursing and an Honorary Bachelor of Science degree from London Southbank University.

Muvirimi has participated in pageants since her high school days. In 1999, she was named Miss Thornhill High and later that year she went on to win the Miss Midlands Schools title.

== Pageants ==
Muvirimi was first runner-up in the UK-based Miss Malaika 2006 pageant.

On 3 June 2007, at the Pegasus Hotel in Kingston, Jamaica, Muvirimi won the title of Miss Global International, and in December of that same year, she won the title of Miss Tourism Zimbabwe, earning a shot at the 2008 Miss World final title in Johannesburg, South Africa on 13 December 2008.

Preceded by Lorraine Maphala	Miss Tourism Zimbabwe; 2007	Succeeded by Incumbent
Preceded by Ropafadzai Garise	Miss Global International; 2007	Succeeded by Incumbent
