= Karolina Zakrzewska =

Polish model (born 1986)

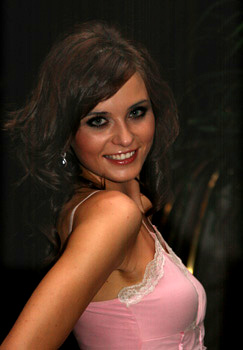
- Karolina during Miss World 2007
- Born: Karolina Zakrzewska; 1986 (age 38–39); Zielona Góra, Poland
- Beauty pageant titleholder
- Title: Miss Poland 2007

Karolina Zakrzewska is a Polish beauty pageant titleholder who represented Poland at Miss World 2007 in China. She studied language and communication science.
