= Kayi Cheung =

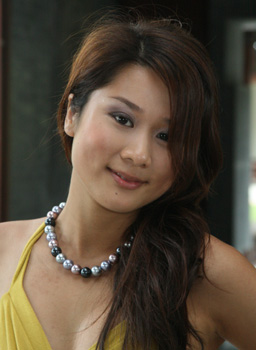
- Cheung in 2007
- Born: Jeung Ka-yee; 18 November 1983 (age 42); Hong Kong
- Education: University of British Columbia; Chinese University of Hong Kong
- Years active: 2007–present
- Spouse: Nathan (m. 2015)
- Awards: Miss Hong Kong 2007; Miss Vitality Ambassador Award

Chinese name
- Traditional Chinese: 張嘉兒
- Simplified Chinese: 张嘉儿
Transcriptions
Standard Mandarin
- Hanyu Pinyin: Zhāng Jiā'ér
- Musical career
- Also known as: Ameowo
- Origin: Chaozhou, Guangdong
- Labels: TVB; 28 Stage

Kayi Cheung (simplified Chinese: 张嘉儿; traditional Chinese: 張嘉兒; Cantonese Yale: Jeung1 Ga1 Yi4; pinyin: Zhāng Jiā'ér; born on 18 November 1983) is a Hongkonger-Canadian model and beauty pageant titleholder who was crowned Miss Hong Kong 2007 and 1st Runner-up of the Miss Chinese International 2008. She also received the Miss Vitality Ambassador award. Cheung had said her goal is to become a successful programme host and to promote healthy living.

Cheung is best friends with Tracy Chu, Roxanne Tong, Angel Chiang and Jennifer Shum.

== Early life ==
Cheung was born on 18 November 1983 in British Hong Kong with family roots in Chaozhou, Guangdong. She was educated at David Thompson Secondary School and graduated from University of British Columbia and Chinese University of Hong Kong. At the age of 9, her family moved to Vancouver, Canada.

== Pageant career ==
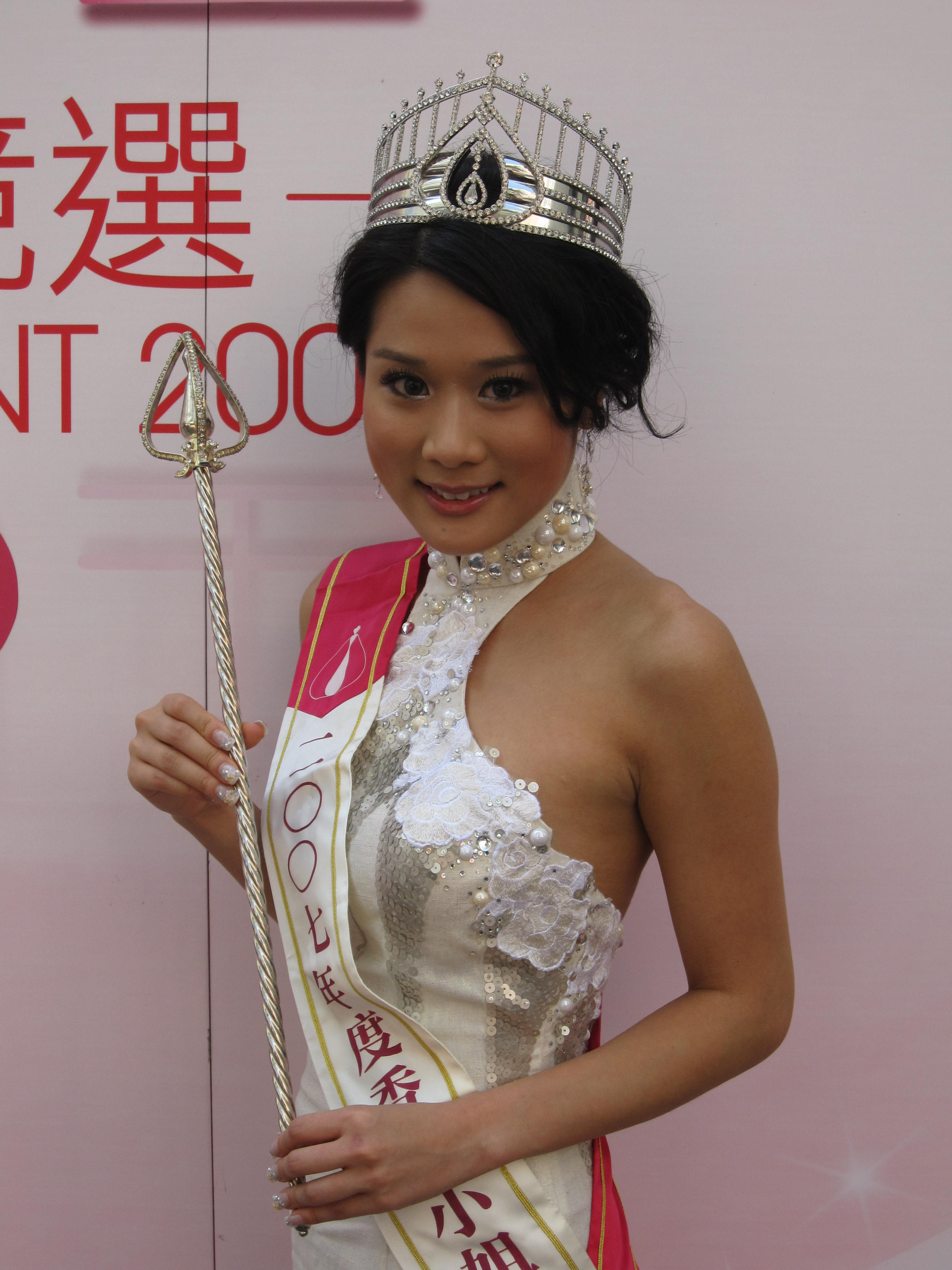
Cheung crowned Miss Hong Kong 2007

In 2005, Cheung entered the Miss Chinese (Vancouver) Pageant but she did not make the Top 3. However, she captured the Miss Vivacious Beauty award. She hosted What's On on Fairchild Television until April 2007 when she returned to Hong Kong as an overseas contestant in the Miss Hong Kong Pageant. Cheung was not a favourite to win, and was not considered a contender. When she was announced as the winner, the reception by the audience and the public was very controversial.

What followed was massive criticism totally unseen in Hong Kong pageant history. The media and the public severely bashed Cheung for being one of the least beautiful Miss Hong Kong winners ever. TVB, the organiser of the pageant, claimed that the onstage performance on the final night was just part of the game and that Cheung had shown very strong communication skills when meeting the judges before the final, which might prove decisive. The public were not convinced, and insisted that Cheung's win was fixed. The bashing continued to the point that there were informal polls among internet fans on whether there should be a re-election of Miss Hong Kong 2007. Nevertheless, Cheung handled the pressure gracefully and remained calm and composed whenever she was asked about all the harsh comments made on her looks.

Cheung competed in Sanya, China for the Miss World 2007 pageant in December 2007. In the pageant she made history by becoming the first Miss Hong Kong to win the Beauty With A Purpose award, based on her charity work for the "Wai Yin Association", a charitable organisation set up by a group of former Miss Hong Kong winners/participants since 1982. Cheung tied with Miss Ecuador, Valeska Saab for the award, so both advanced to the semifinals automatically. She is the first Miss Hong Kong to make the semi-finals since Pauline Yeung in 1987. The Miss World 2007 title went to Zhang Zilin of the People's Republic of China.

In January 2008, Cheung went on to compete in the Miss Chinese International 2008 pageant where she was met again with the same criticism and was not expected to win despite being the host delegate representative. Again she broke all odds and became 1st runner up. This was again criticised as being the result of TVB's "help."

== Post TVB career ==
In 2022, Cheung and her family permanently moved back to Richmond, BC to work on obtaining her real estate license. At the beginning of 2025, she announced that she was kick starting her career as a realtor and has recently shifted her social media focus to selling homes in the Greater Vancouver area.

== Filmography ==
=== Films ===
- 72 Tenants of Prosperity (2010)
- I Love Hong Kong 2013 (2013)

=== TV series ===
Year	Title	Role	Notes
2010	OL Supreme	Seung Ka-ka	
2010	Beauty Knows No Pain	Betty	
2010	Growing Through Life	Fanny	
2011	Til Love Do Us Lie	Ling	
2012	Tiger Cubs	Tong Yuen-kei (唐宛琪)	
2012	Highs and Lows	Operations Officer (霍霜華)	
2013	Sergeant Tabloid	Ivy Wong	
2013	Sniper Standoff	Kwok Mei-kam (郭美金)	
2014	Come Home Love	Isabella	
2015	Brick Slaves	Nana Che Bou-na (車寶娜)	
2015	Angel In-the-Making	Ray's mother (楊志明媽媽)	
2016	K9 Cop	Lai Suk-chu (黎淑珠)	
2016	ICAC Investigators 2016		
2019	My Commissioned Lover		

Achievements
Preceded by Aimee Chan	Miss Hong Kong; 2007	Succeeded by Edelweiss Cheung
Preceded by Lamisi Mbillah	Beauty With A Purpose; 2007; With: Valeska Saab	Succeeded by Gabrielle Walcott
