= Cristin Alexander =

Caymanian model and beauty pageant titleholder

- Born: Cristin Joy Alexander; April 27, 1987 (age 39)
- Height: 1.82 m (5 ft 11 1/2 in)
- Beauty pageant titleholder
- Title: Miss Cayman Islands 2010
- Hair color: Brown
- Eye color: Brown
- Major competitions: Miss Cayman Islands 2010 (Winner) (Best Legs); Miss World 2010; Miss Universe 2011

Cristin Joy Alexander (born 27 April 1987) is a Caymanian model and beauty pageant titleholder who was crowned Miss Cayman Islands 2010. She represented Cayman Islands at Miss Universe 2011 and Miss World 2010.

== Miss Cayman Islands 2010 ==
Representing the district of Bodden Town, and standing 1.82 m (5 ft 11 1/2 in) tall, Alexander competed as one of five finalists in Miss Cayman Islands 2010, held in George Town on 25 September 2010. She won the Best Legs award. Alexander was crowned the winner of the title, gaining the right to represent the Cayman Islands in the 2010 Miss World and the 2011 Miss Universe pageants.

Awards and achievements
Preceded by Nicosia Lawson	Miss Cayman Islands; 2010	Succeeded by Lindsay Japal
