= Sanaa Ismail Hamed =

Egyptian beauty pageant contestant

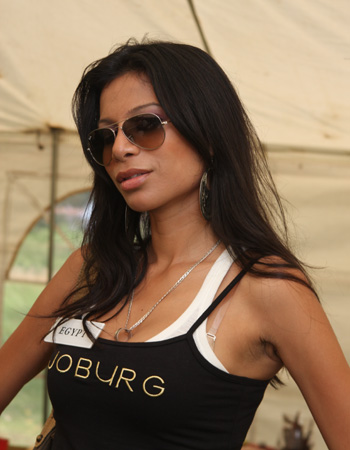
- Born: Sanaa Ismail Hamed; Cairo, Egypt
- Beauty pageant titleholder
- Title: Miss Egypt 2008

Sanaa Ismail Hamed (Arabic: سناء إسماعيل حامد; born 1984) is an Egyptian model and beauty pageant titleholder who represented Egypt at Miss World 2008 in South Africa.
