= Kristīne Djadenko =

Latvian model

- Kristīne during Miss World 2007
- Born: Kristīne Djadenko; 1984 (age 41–42); Riga, Latvian SSR, Soviet Union
- Beauty pageant titleholder
- Title: Miss Latvia 2005

Kristīne Djadenko is a Latvian lawyer and beauty pageant titleholder who represented Latvia at Miss World 2007 in China, and Miss International 2008 in Macau. She previously received the title of Miss Latvia 2005.

Having achieved her bachelor's degree in International Law, she worked in a media agency while studying for her master's degree in Civil Law.
