= Kahurangi Taylor =

New Zealand model

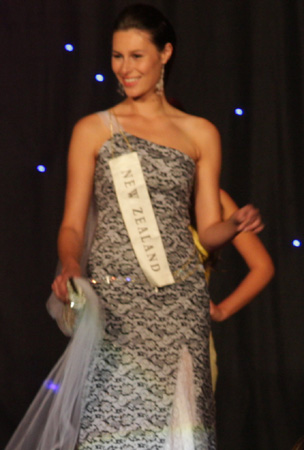
- Born: Kahurangi Taylor; 11 December 1991 (age 34); Auckland, New Zealand
- Height: 1.80 m (5 ft 11 in)
- Beauty pageant titleholder
- Title: Miss New Zealand 2008

Kahurangi Taylor is a New Zealand model and beauty pageant titleholder who represented New Zealand at Miss World 2008 in South Africa.

In 2015, Kahurangi won a NZD$100,000 Vodafone Foundation World of Difference Award, working alongside the outreach team at Te Ara Rangatu o te Iwi o Te Ata Waiohua (TAR) to benefit the community of Waiuku. This follows two years of work as a youth health project co-ordinator at Manurewa Marae.

Kahurangi's iwi is Ngati Te Ata.
