= Cynthia Calderón =

Peruvian model

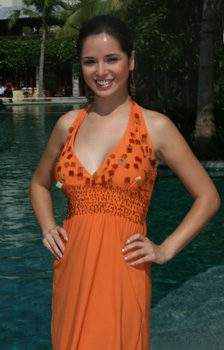
- Born: Cynthia Jessenia Calderón Ulloa; 1988 (age 37–38); Tacna, Peru
- Beauty pageant titleholder
- Title: Miss Peru 2007

Cynthia Jessenia Calderón Ulloa (born 1988) is a Peruvian model and beauty pageant titleholder who represented Peru in Miss World 2007 in China.

== Miss World 2007 ==
Calderon was the first Peruvian woman to pass at 2 Fast Track Awards: The Miss World Beach Beauty, when she placed 13th; and The Miss World Top Model, when she placed 13th.
