= Katherine Medina =

Colombian beauty queen

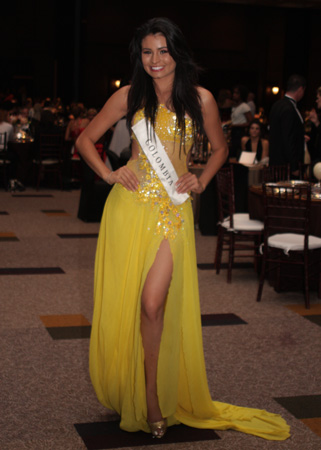
- Born: Katherine Medina; Medellín, Colombia
- Beauty pageant titleholder
- Title: Miss Colombia 2008

Katherine Medina is a Colombian model and beauty pageant titleholder who represented Colombia in Miss World 2008 in South Africa after winning the Miss World Colombia 2008 pageant. She studied Public Accounting in school.
