= Candace Charles =

Guyanese model and beauty pageant titleholder

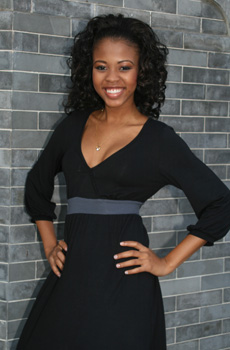
- Candace Charles during Miss World Pageant
- Born: Candace Charles; 1990 (age 35–36); Georgetown, Guyana
- Beauty pageant titleholder
- Title: Miss Guyana 2007

Candace Charles (born 1990) is a Guyanese model and beauty pageant titleholder who has been representative for the country in various pageants including Miss World 2007 held in China, and Miss Europe & World Junior pageant in Czech Republic from September 20 to October 5, 2008.

Candace received a bachelor's degree in Food and Beverage Management from Kendall College in Chicago, in 2015.

Candace currently owns Night Cap, a cafe and restaurant in Georgetown, Guyana.
