= Valeska Saab =

Ecuadorian beauty queen, politician and charity worker

Valeska Saab Gómez
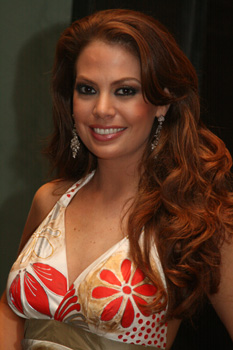
- Saab during the Miss World 2007 pageant in Sanya, China
- Born: Valeska Alexandra Saab Gómez; 7 May 1984 (age 42); Guayaquil, Ecuador
- Education: Unidad Educativa Bilingüe Nuevo Mundo High School
- Alma mater: Brookdale Community College; Blue Hill College
- Occupations: Politician; Charity worker; Beauty pageant titleholder
- Height: 1.73 m (5 ft 8 in)
- Spouse: Nicolás Florido
- Children: 2
- Beauty pageant titleholder
- Title: Virreina de Guayaquil 2004; Miss Maja Mundial 2005; Miss World Ecuador 2007; Beauty with a Purpose 2007
- Major competitions: Reina Hispanoamericana 2004 (Unplaced); Miss Ecuador 2007; Miss World 2007; (Top 16)

Valeska Alexandra Saab Gómez (born 7 May 1984) is an Ecuadorian charity worker, model, and beauty pageant titleholder.

The 2005 Miss Maja Mundial title holder and, with Kayi Cheung from Hong Kong, the 2007 Beauty with a Purpose Challenge winner during the Miss World 2007 contest. In Ecuador, she is noted for her work with children suffering from ichthyosis. From 2009 to 2013, she was a member of the Andean Parliament for the PSC.

== Early life ==
Saab was born in Guayaquil, Ecuador, to Jesús Saab and María del Rocío Chio Gómez Buenaventura on Monday, May 7, 1984. Just the day before her birth (Sunday, May 6), León Febres Cordero had become President of Ecuador defeating Rodrigo Borja in the second round of the 1984 Ecuadorian Presidential Election. She has two older brothers, Cristian and Patrick, and a younger one, Javier. In Guayaquil, Saab attended the Unidad Educativa Bilingüe Nuevo Mundo High School, Brookdale Community College and Blue Hill College where she studied International Business. She is fluent in Spanish and English.

== Pageantry ==
Her beauty queen career began in 2000 in Salinas, a coastal city in the Santa Elena Province, Ecuador, near Guayaquil, when she was crowned Reina del Salinas Yacht Club. In 2004, in the Reina de Guayaquil pageant, Saab placed as first runner-up and so won the title of Virreina de Guayaquil. After that, she was chosen Reina Hispanoamericana Ecuador 2004 and so competed in the Reina Hispanoamericana contest held in Cochabamba, Bolivia, but without success. However, a few months after, in Sincelejo, Colombia, Saab won the Miss Maja Mundial 2005, her major international title. She placed again as first runner-up in the Miss Ecuador 2007 pageant and so won the Miss World Ecuador 2007 title.

Saab then competed in the Miss World 2007 held in Sanya, People's Republic of China where she made history by becoming the first Miss Ecuador to win the Beauty With A Purpose award, based on her charity work helping children with a terrible genetic skin condition called ichthyosis. Saab tied with Miss Hong Kong, Kayi Cheung, for the award so both advanced to the semifinals automatically. She is the first Miss Ecuador to make the Miss World semifinals since Alicia Gisela Cucalón Macas did in 1986. Saab retired from beauty contests in 2007 and began a career as a model.

== Political career ==
In 2009, Saab was elected to the Andean Parliament for the Madera de Guerrero/PSC, the former President León Febres Cordero's Political Party. In May 2012, as President of Fifth Commission "Of Social Affairs and Human Development", she coordinated the III Social Andean Summit. She finished her period in 2013.

== Charity Work ==
After winning the title of Miss World Ecuador 2007, Saab began helping children affected by a rare disease called ichtyosis; and her work continues from then on. In addition, she is a member of the board of management of a charitable foundation called Kinderzentrum, an institution helping children with Down syndrome, autism, cerebral palsy among other emotional problems.

== Personal life ==
Saab is of Lebanese background. She is niece of the 1971 Miss World Ecuador María Cecila Gómez Buenaventura and her husband, the economist, politician and former Ecuadorian basketball player Nicolás Lapentti Carrión, who was a close collaborator of the ex-President Febres Cordero, National Assembly Member from 2009 to 2013 and, for almost 17 years in a row, Prefect of the Province of Guayas. Saab is cousin of the former professional tennis players Nicolás and Giovanni Lapentti, and 1990 French Open winner Andrés Gómez's niece. On January 14, 2011, in Samborondón, near Guayaquil, she married young Guayaquilean entrepreneur Nicolás Florido. Saab gave birth to her first daughter Alana (named after American professional surfer Alana Rene Blanchard) on October 11, 2012 and to her second one, Alissa, in 2014.

Awards and achievements
Preceded by Jazmín Carrión	Virreina de Guayaquil; 2004	Succeeded by María Antonieta Tanús
Preceded by María Luisa Barrios	Reina Hispanoamericana Ecuador; 2004	Succeeded by Priscila Del Salto
Preceded by (Colombia) Sandra Milena Sánchez Valencia	Miss Maja Mundial; 2005	Succeeded by (Serbia and Montenegro) (Canada) Ana Zotovic
Preceded by Rebeca Flores	Miss World Ecuador; 2007	Succeeded by Marjorie Cevallos
Preceded by (Ghana) Lamisi Mbillah	Miss World Beauty With A Purpose; 2007; With: (Hong Kong) Kayi Cheung	Succeeded by (Trinidad and Tobago) Gabrielle Walcott
