= Valene Maharaj =

Trinidadian model

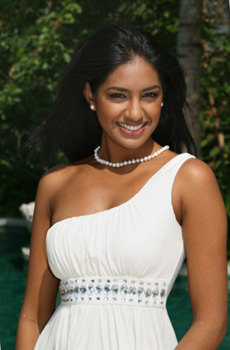
- Maharaj in 2007
- Born: Valene Maharaj; April 25, 1986 (age 40); Gasparillo, Trinidad and Tobago
- Height: 1.73 m (5 ft 8 in)
- Spouse: Vishal Maharaj (m. 2012)
- Beauty pageant titleholder
- Title: Miss Trinidad and Tobago 2007; Miss World Caribbean 2007
- Major competitions: Miss World 2007; (Top 5)

Valene Maharaj (born April 25, 1986) is a Trinidadian model and beauty pageant titleholder who was crowned Miss Trinidad and Tobago and Miss World Caribbean in 2007.

== Early life and education ==
Valene Maharaj was born on April 25, 1986 in Gasparillo, Trinidad to Sumintra and Ashuk. The third of four children, she grew up in St Margaret's Village, Claxton Bay. She graduated from Southern Community College with an associate's degree in business administration and attended American InterContinental University South Florida for fashion and marketing.

== Career ==
Maharaj became active in the fashion industry at age 16, winning the Caribbean Model Search and attending Jamaica's Fashion Week in 2003. In March 2006, she won the first runner-up spot at the Miss Trinidad and Tobago pageant. In 2007, Maharaj won the Miss Trinidad and Tobago pageant. At the Miss World 2007 pageant, she placed in the Top 5 and won Miss World Caribbean. She supported Paint your Dreams, an arts charity in Tacarigua.

In August 2025, Maharaj joined the board of governors at the University of Trinidad and Tobago.

== Personal life ==
She married Vishal Maharaj in 2012 in a traditional Hindu service.

| Preceded by Sara Lawrence | Miss World Caribbean; 2007 | Succeeded by Gabrielle Walcott |
| Preceded by Tineke De Freitas | Miss Trinidad and Tobago World; 2007 | Succeeded by Gabrielle Walcott |
