= Brittany Lyons =

Jamaican beauty pageant contestant (born 1989)

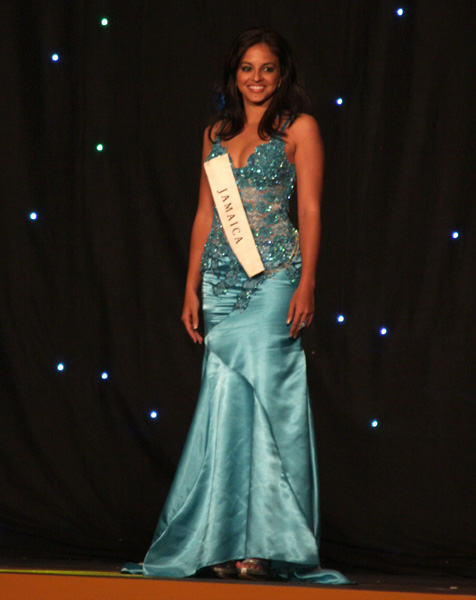
- Born: Brittany Lyons; February 17, 1989 (age 36); Kingston, Jamaica
- Beauty pageant titleholder
- Title: Miss Jamaica 2008

Brittany Lyons is a Jamaican model and beauty pageant titleholder who represented Jamaica in Miss World 2008 in South Africa.

== Education ==
She has an associate degree in business administration from the University of the Commonwealth Caribbean, and a Bachelor's Degree from Florida International University.

== Career ==
Lyons represented Jamaica in Miss World 2008.

She is now the Founder and CEO of “Paradise Child” a Skin Care & wellness brand. Brittany also holds a Real Estate Salesman license is Florida and Jamaica.

== Recognition ==
Lyons was awarded the Beach Beauty Title on the winning night. She went on to represent Jamaica in the Miss World Competition in South Africa.
