= Charisse Melany Moll =

Surinamese beauty pageant contestant

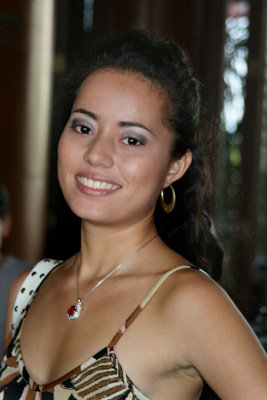
- Charisse Melany Moll during Miss World
- Born: Charisse Melany Moll; July 27, 1985 (age 39); Paramaribo, Suriname
- Beauty pageant titleholder
- Title: Miss Suriname 2007

Charisse Melany Moll (born July 27, 1985) is a Surinamese model and beauty pageant titleholder who represented Suriname in Miss World 2007 in China.
