= Maribel Arana =

Guatemalan model and beauty pageant contestant

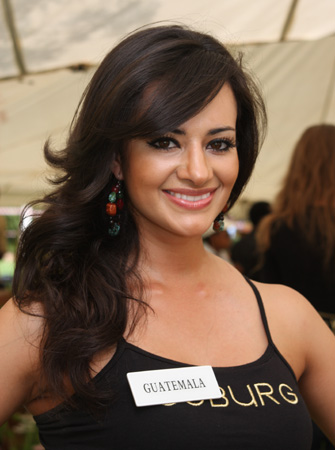
- Born: Maribel Arana; 1985 (age 40–41); Guatemala City, Guatemala
- Beauty pageant titleholder
- Title: Miss Guata 2008

Maribel Arana is a Guatemalan actress, model and beauty pageant titleholder who represented Guatemala at Miss World 2008 in South Africa, by virtue of winning the Miss World Guatemala 2008 pageant. She studied telecommunications at the Galileo University.
