= Nicosia Lawson =

Cayman Islands beauty pageant titleholder

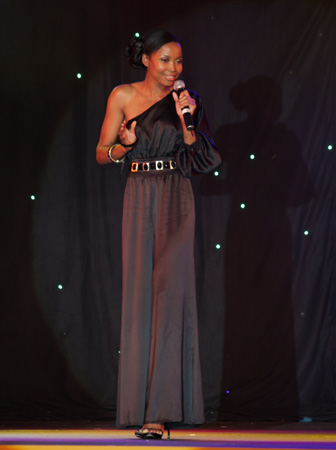
- Born: Nicosia Lawson; 1983 (age 41–42); Kingstown, Saint Vincent and the Grenadines
- Height: 1.75 m (5 ft 9 in)
- Beauty pageant titleholder
- Title: Miss Cayman Islands 2008

Nicosia Lawson is a Vincentian and Grenadinian-Caymanian model and beauty pageant titleholder who represented the Cayman Islands in both Miss World 2008 and Miss Universe 2009. She previously placed 2nd runner-up in the 2000 Miss Teen Cayman Islands competition.

== Early life ==
Nicosia was born in Saint Vincent and the Grenadines on 4 April 1983 but grew up in the Cayman Islands.

She has represented the Cayman Islands as an athlete in netball and track and field as well as a youth ambassador (CARICOM Youth Ambassador (2006 to 2008) and at the 6th Commonwealth Youth Forum in Uganda in 2007).

== Modelling ==
Nicosia was signed with B&M Models in Toronto and Models International Management in Ottawa. She was featured in a fashion spread in Glow magazine in 2004.

In 2006 Nicosia started her own local women's magazine called Inspire.

== Charity work and social groups ==
Nicosia has continually expressed her passion for the fight against HIV/AIDS and has supported organizations that advocate education and prevention, research and legislation, capacity building and advocacy. She supports the Cayman Aids Foundation (CAF) and was trained as a National Trainer for the Cayman Islands' Red Cross 'Together We Can' Peer-to-Peer program. She is currently working on a short documentary to educate young people in the Cayman Islands about HIV/AIDS and has already launched Public Service Announcements encouraging young people to know their status.

She is also a member of the Rotaract Blue Club of the Cayman Islands and was the Director of International Service for 2007 to 2008.

== Miss World 2008 ==
At the 2008 Miss World competition Nicosia was one of the top 16 finalists in the fast track talent event where she sang India.Arie's 'Ready for Love'.

== Sources ==
- Miss Cayman Islands 2007 / 2008
- News article
- Article

Awards and achievements
Preceded by Rebecca Parchment	Miss Cayman Islands; 2008	Vacant Title next held by Cristin Alexander (2010)
