= Ruth Kinuthia =

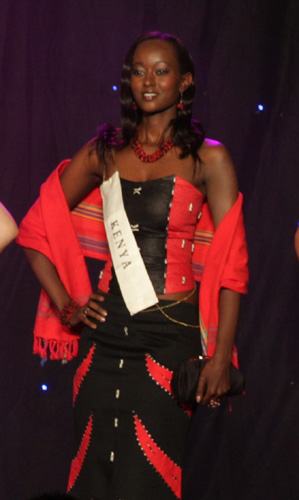
- Born: Ruth Kinuthia; Nairobi, Kenya
- Beauty pageant titleholder
- Title: Miss Kenya 2008

Ruth Kinuthia is a Kenyan make-up artist and beauty pageant titleholder.

== Biography ==
Kinuthia won the Miss Kenya 2008 at the age of 26 and represented her country in Miss World 2008 in South Africa. She studied international business administration and has a degree in law.

Kinuthia later founded her own make-up business, and In 2016 she won Makeup Artist of the Year at the Kenya Fashion Awards.
