= Agustina Quinteros =

Argentine model (born 1990)

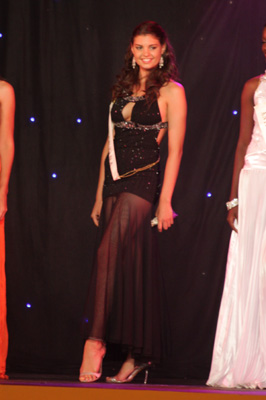
- Born: Agustina Quinteros; 24 September 1990 (age 35); Santa Rosa, La Pampa, Argentina
- Beauty pageant titleholder
- Title: Miss Argentina 2008

Agustina Quinteros (born 24 September 1990) is an Argentine model and beauty pageant titleholder who was crowned Belleza Argentina 2008 and represented Argentina at Miss World 2008 in South Africa. She also crowned Miss Tourism Ibero-America 2009 (the first edition) in the city of Las Termas de Río Hondo, Argentina.

== Early life ==
She was born in Santa Rosa, Argentina, in 1990.

== Career ==
She trained as a model and was employed in a number of fashion shows in 2008. Other work areas have included appearances in Television commercials and on poster advertising campaigns. At 17 years old, she became beauty queen of La Pampa. At Rio Hondo (Santiago del Estero), she entered a competition among 24 of the most beautiful women in Argentina. She went on to win and was chosen to represent her country as Miss Internacional Argentina.

Preceded by Alejandra Bernal	Belleza Argentina; 2008	Succeeded by Lucía Manchón
Preceded by Alejandra Bernal	Miss Continente Americano Argentina; 2008	Succeeded by Lucía Manchón
