= Claudia Russo =

Italian beauty pageant contestant

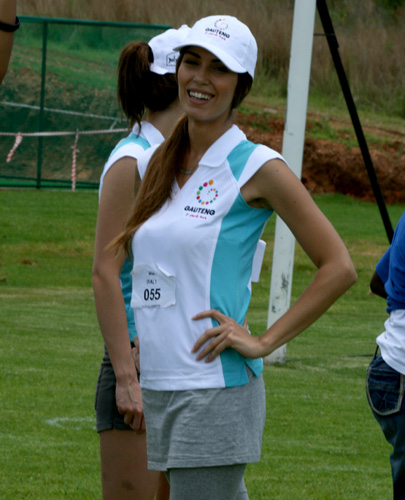
- Born: Claudia Russo; 1983 (age 42–43); Messina, Italy
- Beauty pageant titleholder
- Title: Miss World Italy 2008

Claudia Russo (born 1983) is an Italian actress and beauty pageant titleholder who represented Italy in Miss World 2008 in South Africa. She has an academic degree in fashion design. She's a model for catwalks and photoshoots in Italy; she also worked for RAI and Mediaset television in 2007 with Paolo Bonolis. She's tall at 178 cm for 53 kg. She has dark blonde hair and dark green eyes. She loves fashion and Italian football. Her favourite designer is Alexander McQueen, and her favourite team is A.C. Milan.
