= Melissa Sneekes =

Dutch beauty pageant winner

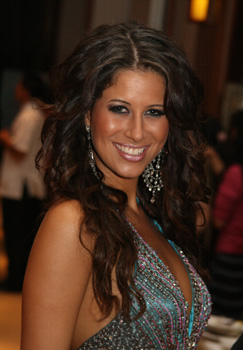
- Melissa Sneekes during Miss World
- Born: Melissa Sneekes; 15/07/1983; The Hague, Netherlands
- Beauty pageant titleholder
- Title: Miss Netherlands 2007

Melissa Sneekes, is a Dutch model and beauty pageant titleholder who represented the Netherlands at Miss World 2007 in China.
