= Edelweiss Cheung =

- Born: 27 October 1985 (age 39); Hong Kong
- Years active: 2008 – present
- Height: 1.8 m (5 ft 11 in)

Chinese name
Transcriptions
Standard Mandarin
- Hanyu Pinyin: zhang1 shu1 ya3
Yue: Cantonese
- Jyutping: zoeng1 syu1 ngaa5
- Musical career
- Also known as: Edel
- Labels: TVB (2008); JamCast Management (HK)

Edelweiss Cheung (Chinese: 張舒雅, born 27 October 1985) is a Hong Kong model and beauty pageant titleholder who was crowned Miss Hong Kong 2008.

== Biography ==
Cheung was on born 27 October 1985 in British Hong Kong. Her parents are Chinese Americans from Shantou, Guangdong. She attended at Hoi Ping Chamber of Commerce Secondary School and also educated in American International School Hong Kong. Later, she move to United States to attend design classes at the Burgo Fashion and Design Institute.

Cheung, aged 22 and standing at 1.8 m (5 ft 11 in), was the tallest Miss Hong Kong since 1973. She competed in Miss Hong Kong Pageant which was held on 19 July 2008 at the Hong Kong Convention and Exhibition Centre. She won the Miss Hong Kong 2008 pageant. After winning the crown, Cheung was criticised for smoking and kissing her boyfriend in public. The pageant organiser TVB froze Cheung's contract following criticism of her behaviour on public, which it deemed unfit for a Miss Hong Kong champion. Cheung was not invited to present at Miss Hong Kong Pageant 2009 and crown her successor, Sandy Lau.

Awards and achievements
Preceded by Kayi Cheung	Miss Hong Kong; 2008	Succeeded by Sandy Lau
