= Giada Wiltshire =

Italian Miss World delegate (born 1990)

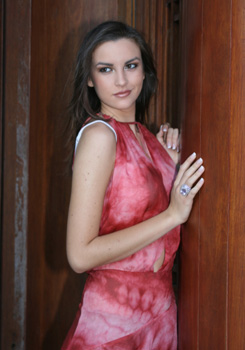
- Giada during Miss World 2007
- Born: Giada Wiltshire; 1990 (age 34–35); Lugo di Romagna, Italy
- Beauty pageant titleholder
- Title: Miss Italy 2007

Giada Wiltshire is an Italian beauty pageant titleholder. She is of partial English descent through her father, who won Miss World Italy 2007 and represented Italy in Miss World 2007 in China. She studied at the Art Institute of Faenza in Ravenna, Italy.
