= Miss World 2008 =

International beauty pageant

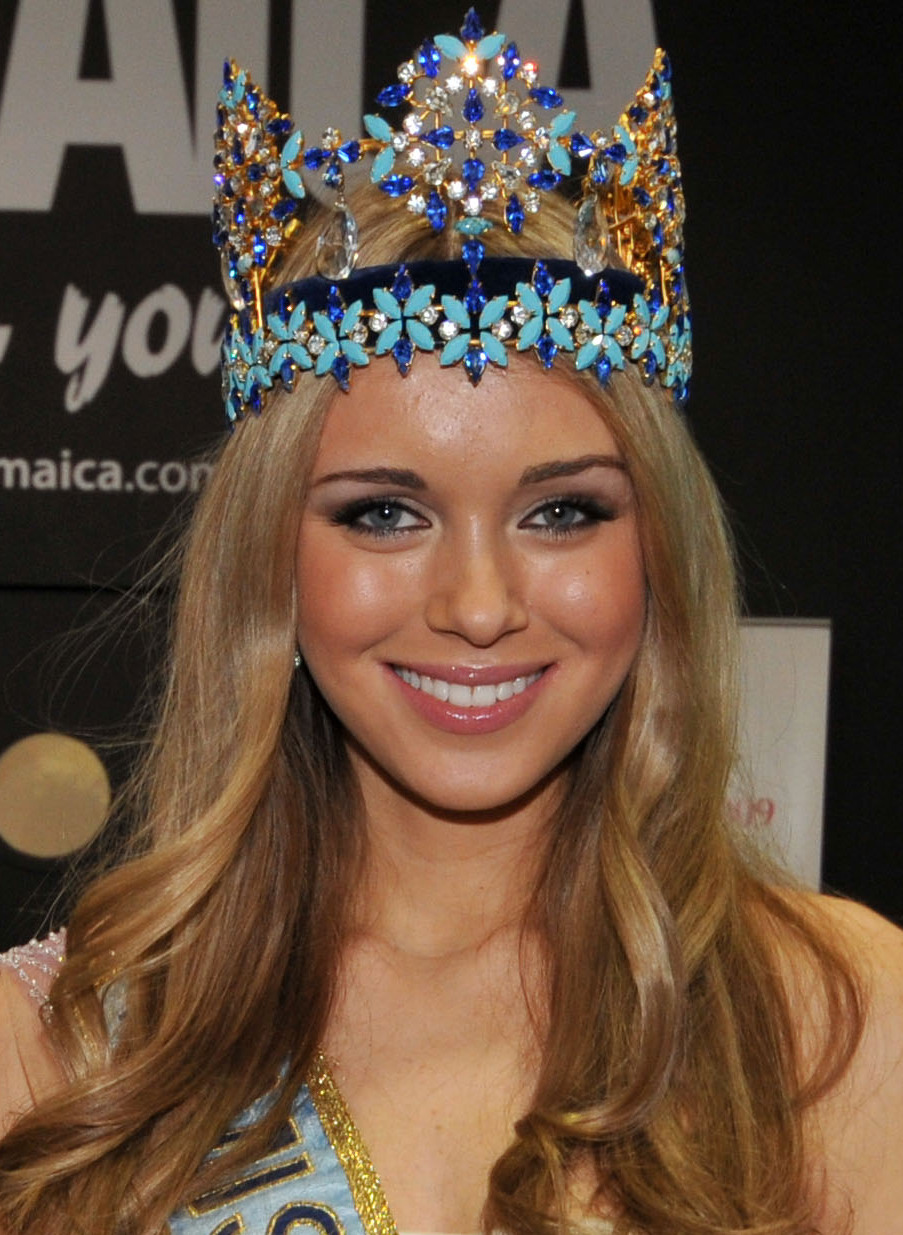
- Ksenia Sukhinova
- Date: 13 December 2008
- Presenters: Tumisho Masha; Angela Chow
- Entertainment: Alesha Dixon; McFly
- Venue: Sanndton Convention Centre, Johannesburg, South Africa
- Broadcaster: E!; SABC 3; Challenge
- Entrants: 109
- Placements: 15
- Withdrawals: Estonia; Grenada; Macedonia; Nepal; Panama; Romania; Slovenia; Suriname
- Returns: Antigua and Barbuda; Barbados; Democratic Republic of the Congo; Egypt; Honduras; Portugal; Saint Lucia; Seychelles; Taiwan; Uruguay; Zambia
- Winner: Ksenia Sukhinova; Russia

Miss World 2008 was the 58th edition of the Miss World pageant, held at the Sandton Convention Centre in Johannesburg, South Africa, on 13 December 2008.

At the end of the event, Zhang Zilin of China crowned Ksenia Sukhinova of Russia as her successor. This is the first victory of Russia after 16 years, and it's overall second victory. The first and second runners-up for this edition is: India's Parvathy Omanakuttan and Trinidad and Tobago's Gabrielle Walcott.

== Background ==
=== Date and location ===
Originally, the pageant was going to take place in Kyiv, Ukraine, but because of the ongoing 2008 Russo-Georgian diplomatic crisis in neighbouring South Ossetia, the Miss World Organization decided to move the pageant away from Eastern Europe.

=== Selection of participants ===
==== Replacements ====
Janina San Miguel was replaced by first Runner-up of Binibining Pilipinas, Danielle Castaño due to Janina's personal decision to give up her crown.

==== Returns, and, withdrawals ====
This edition saw the return of Antigua and Barbuda, Barbados, the Democratic Republic of the Congo, Egypt, Honduras, Portugal, Saint Lucia, Seychelles, Taiwan, Uruguay and Zambia; Seychelles, which last competed in 1999, Antigua and Barbuda, Egypt and Honduras in 2004, Taiwan in 2005 and Barbados, the Democratic Republic of the Congo, Portugal, Saint Lucia, Uruguay and Zambia in 2006.

Estonia, Grenada, Macedonia, Nepal, Panama, Romania, Slovenia and Suriname, withdrew from the competition.

== Results ==
=== Placements ===
Placement	Contestant
Miss World 2008	Russia – Ksenia Sukhinova
1st Runner-Up	India – Parvathy Omanakuttan
2nd Runner-Up	Trinidad and Tobago – Gabrielle Walcott
Top 5	Angola – Birgite dos Santos; South Africa – Tansey Coetzee
Top 15	Barbados – Natalie Griffith; Brazil – Tamara Almeida; Croatia – Josipa Kusić; Iceland – Alexandra Ívarsdóttir; Kazakhstan – Alfina Nasyrova; Mexico – Anagabriela Espinoza; Puerto Rico – Ivonne Orsini; Spain – Patricia Rodríguez; Ukraine – Iryna Zhuravska; Venezuela – Hannelly Quintero

==== Continental Queens of Beauty ====
Winners were as follows:

Continental Group	Contestant
Africa	Angola – Birgite dos Santos
Americas	Venezuela – Hannelly Quintero
Asia & Oceania	India – Parvathy Omanakuttan
Caribbean	Trinidad and Tobago – Gabrielle Walcott
Europe	Russia – Ksenia Sukhinova

==== Order of Announcements ====
Top 15

1. Russia
2. Mexico
3. Barbados
4. Iceland
5. Trinidad and Tobago
6. Venezuela
7. Ukraine
8. Croatia
9. Brazil
10. Angola
11. Kazakhstan
12. Puerto Rico
13. Spain
14. South Africa
15. India

Top 5

1. India
2. Trinidad and Tobago
3. Angola
4. Russia
5. South Africa

== Contestants ==
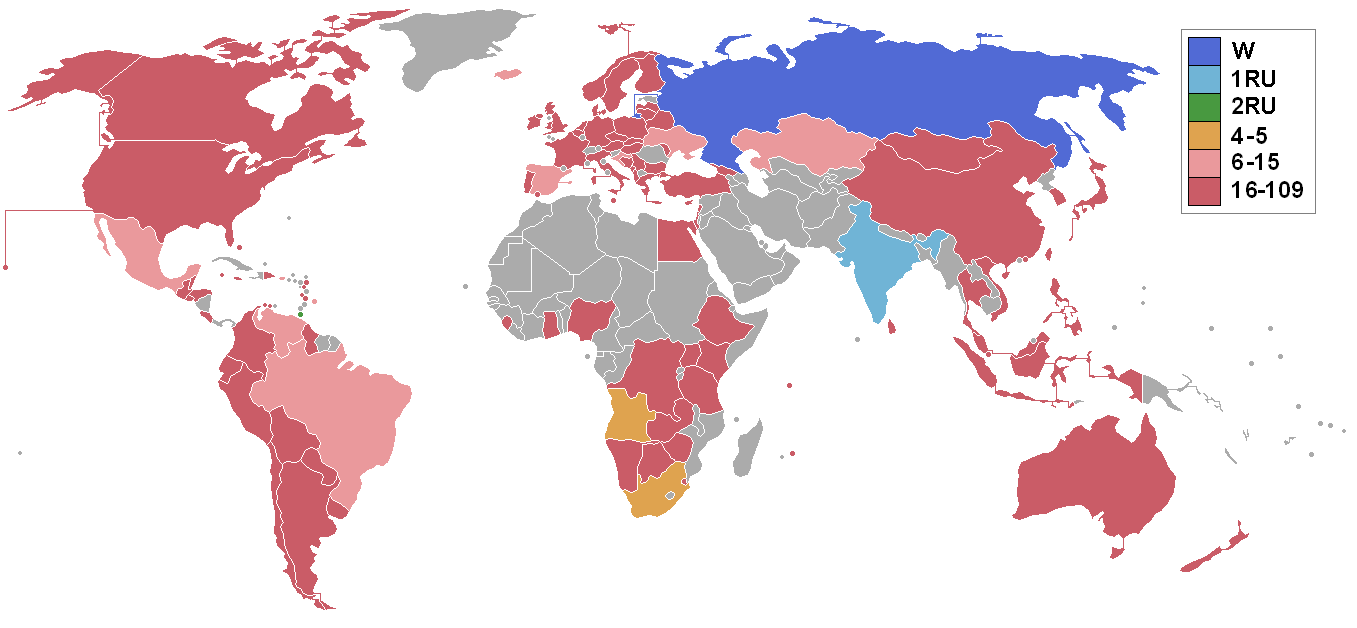
Countries and territories which sent delegates and results for Miss World 2008

Miss World 2008 had a total of 109 contestants.

Country	Contestant	Age (Note: Ages at the time of the pageant)	Hometown	Regional
Albania	Egla Harxhi	17	Tirana	Europe
Angola	Birgite dos Santos	18	Luanda	Africa
Antigua and Barbuda	Athina James	18	St. John's	Caribbean
Argentina	Agustina Quinteros	18	Santa Rosa	Americas
Aruba	Christina Trejo	20	Tanki Flip	Caribbean
Australia	Katie Richardson	20	Albion Park	Asia & Oceania
Austria	Kathrin Krahfuss	23	Graz	Europe
Bahamas	Tinnyse Johnson	21	Nassau	Caribbean
Barbados	Natalie Griffith	18	Bridgetown	Caribbean
Belarus	Volha Khizhynkova	21	Vitebsk	Europe
Belgium	Alizée Poulicek	21	Brussels	Europe
Belize	Charmaine Chinapen	21	Belize City	Americas
Bolivia	Jackelin Arias	18	Santa Cruz	Americas
Bosnia and Herzegovina	Tanja Vujičić	18	Nevesinje	Europe
Botswana	Itseng Kgomotso	19	Gaborone	Africa
Brazil	Tamara Almeida	23	Ipatinga	Americas
Bulgaria	Julia Yurevich	19	Kozloduy	Europe
Canada	Leah Ryerse	20	Hamilton	Americas
Cayman Islands	Nicosia Lawson	25	George Town	Caribbean
Chile	Nataly Chilet	23	Santiago	Americas
China	Mei Yan Ling	25	Dalian	Asia & Oceania
Colombia	Katherine Medina	18	Medellín	Americas
Costa Rica	Amalia Matamoros	19	Naranjo	Americas
Croatia	Josipa Kusić	20	Zagreb	Europe
Curaçao	Norayla Francisco	23	Willemstad	Caribbean
Cyprus	Mari Vasileiou	18	Larnaca	Europe
Czech Republic	Zuzana Jandová	20	Karviná	Europe
Democratic Republic of the Congo	Christelle Mbila	18	Kinshasa	Africa
Denmark	Lisa Lents	21	Copenhagen	Europe
Dominican Republic	Geisha Montes De Oca	21	Santo Domingo	Caribbean
Ecuador	Marjorie Cevallos	22	Guayaquil	Americas
Egypt	Sanaa Ismail Hamed	24	Alexandria	Africa
El Salvador	Gabriela Gavidia	18	La Libertad	Americas
England	Laura Coleman	22	Leicester	Europe
Ethiopia	Hibret Fekadu	18	Addis Abeba	Africa
Finland	Linda Wikstedt	19	Helsinki	Europe
France	Laura Tanguy	20	Angers	Europe
Georgia	Khatuna Skhirtladze	18	Tbilisi	Europe
Germany	Anne Katrin Walter	21	Dahme-Spreewald	Europe
Ghana	Frances Takyi-Mensah	22	Elmina	Africa
Gibraltar	Krystel Robba	22	Gibraltar	Europe
Greece	Aggeliki Kalaitzi	24	Thessaloniki	Europe
Guadeloupe	Frédérika Charpentier	23	Basse-Terre	Caribbean
Guatemala	Maribel Arana	23	Guatemala City	Americas
Guyana	Christa Simmons	23	Georgetown	Americas
Honduras	Gabriela Zavala	23	San Pedro Sula	Americas
Hong Kong	Skye Chan	24	Hong Kong	Asia & Oceania
Hungary	Szilvia Freire	24	Budapest	Europe
Iceland	Alexandra Ívarsdóttir	18	Reykjavík	Europe
India	Parvathy Omanakuttan	21	Kottayam	Asia & Oceania
Indonesia	Sandra Angelia Hadisiswantoro	22	Surabaya	Asia & Oceania
Ireland	Sinéad Noonan	21	County Meath	Europe
Israel	Tamar Ziskind	23	Haifa	Asia & Oceania
Italy	Claudia Russo	25	Messina	Europe
Jamaica	Brittany Lyons	19	Kingston	Caribbean
Japan	Mizuki Kubodera	21	Kanagawa	Asia & Oceania
Kazakhstan	Alfina Nassyrova	20	Almaty	Asia & Oceania
Kenya	Ruth Kinuthia	22	Nairobi	Africa
Latvia	Ina Avlasēviča	20	Dobele	Europe
Lebanon	Rosarita Tawil	20	Beirut	Asia & Oceania
Lithuania	Gabrielė Martirosianaitė	18	Kaunas	Europe
Malaysia	Soo Wincci	23	Selangor	Asia & Oceania
Malta	Martha Fenech	18	St. Julian's	Europe
Martinique	Élodie Delor	18	Fort-de-France	Caribbean
Mauritius	Olivia Carey	19	Vacoas	Africa
Mexico	Anagabriela Espinoza	20	Monterrey	Americas
Moldova	Iana Varnacova	17	Chișinău	Europe
Mongolia	Chinbatyn Anun	23	Ulaanbaatar	Asia & Oceania
Montenegro	Mariana Mihajlović	18	Plavnica	Europe
Namibia	Marelize Robberts	21	Windhoek	Africa
Netherlands	Carmen Kool	22	Arnhem	Europe
New Zealand	Kahurangi Taylor	18	Auckland	Asia & Oceania
Nigeria	Adaeze Igwe	18	Awka	Africa
Northern Ireland	Judith Wilson	23	Enniskillen	Europe
Norway	Lene Egeli	21	Stavanger	Europe
Paraguay	Gabriela Rejala	19	Ñemby	Americas
Peru	Annmarie Dehainaut	18	Lima	Americas
Philippines	Danielle Castaño	19	Quezon City	Asia & Oceania
Poland	Klaudia Ungerman	20	Wysieradz	Europe
Portugal	Andreia Rodrigues	24	Lisbon	Europe
Puerto Rico	Ivonne Orsini	20	Bayamón	Caribbean
Russia	Ksenia Sukhinova	21	Tyumen	Europe
Saint Lucia	Joy-Ann Biscette	22	Castries	Caribbean
Scotland	Stephanie Willemse	19	Glasgow	Europe
Serbia	Nevena Lipovac	19	Belgrade	Europe
Seychelles	Elena Angione	22	Mahé	Africa
Sierra Leone	Tyrilla Gouldson	24	Freetown	Africa
Singapore	Faraliza Tan	22	Singapore	Asia & Oceania
Slovakia	Edita Krešáková	19	Seňa	Europe
South Africa	Tansey Coetzee	23	Johannesburg	Africa
South Korea (Note: Competed as Korea in the pageant)	Choi Bo-in	22	Seoul	Asia & Oceania
Spain	Patricia Rodríguez	18	Granadilla de Abona	Europe
Sri Lanka	Rochelle Correa	24	Colombo	Asia & Oceania
Swaziland	Tiffany Simelane	20	Mhlambanyatsi	Africa
Sweden	Jennifer Palm Lundberg	22	Sigtuna	Europe
Taiwan (Note: Also known as the Republic of China)	Jamie Lin	24	Taichung	Asia & Oceania
Tanzania	Nasreen Karim	22	Mwanza	Africa
Thailand	Ummarapas Jullakasian	23	Nonthaburi	Asia & Oceania
Trinidad and Tobago	Gabrielle Walcott	23	Petit Valley	Caribbean
Turkey	Leyla Lydia Tuğutlu	19	Istanbul	Europe
Uganda	Dora Mwima	18	Tororo	Africa
Ukraine	Iryna Zhuravska	18	Kyiv	Europe
United States	Lane Lindell	18	Tampa	Americas
Uruguay	Fatimih Dávila	20	Montevideo	Americas
Venezuela	Hannelly Quintero	23	Ocumare del Tuy	Americas
Vietnam	Dương Trương Thiên Lý	19	Đồng Tháp	Asia & Oceania
Wales	Chloe-Beth Morgan	22	Cwmbran	Europe
Zambia	Winfridah Mofu	19	Lusaka	Africa
Zimbabwe	Cynthia Muvirimi	25	Harare	Africa

== Judges ==
Miss World 2008 contestants were judged based upon the criteria of glamour, beauty, intelligence and poise. Some of the judges were representatives of the Miss World Organization. Some of the contestants, such as Ksenia Sukhinova, communicated with the judges using a translator. Judges for the event were:

- Julia Morley – Chairwoman of the Miss World Organization.
- Wilnelia Merced – Miss World 1975 from Puerto Rico
- Aminurta Kang – Theatre stage director, China and North America
- Krish Naidoo – International ambassador for Miss World
- Pearl Luthuli – Group executive public commercial services SABC
- Lindiwe Mahlangu – Chief executive of the Joburg Tourism Company
- Precious Moloi-Motsepe – Chairperson of African Fashion International
- Graham Cooke – President of World Travel

== Notes ==
=== Designations ===
- Thailand – Miss Thailand World was not held this year due to the death of Princess Galyani Vadhana, the elder sister of then King Bhumibol Adulyadej, so the previous year's 1st runner-up, Ummarapas Jullakasian represented Thailand.

=== Replacements ===
- Egypt – Meriam George was replaced by Sanaa Ismail Hamed at the last minute for some undisclosed reasons.
- France – Valérie Bègue was replaced by Laura Tanguy after suggestive photos of Bègue were released to the public and the Miss France Company decided to bar Bègue from competing internationally after she refused to resign.
- Hong Kong – Miss Hong Kong 2008 winner Edelweiss Cheung was replaced by the 1st runner-up, Skye Chan.
- Sweden – Jennifer Palm Lundberg placed 3rd Runner-up in the Miss World Sweden pageant, but won the title when each of the original top three placers declined the crown after disagreements over the winner's contract.
- Vietnam – Miss Vietnam 2008 Trần Thị Thùy Dung was not allowed to compete after she was found ineligible. The 1st Runner-up Phan Hoàng Minh Thư and the 2nd Runner-up Nguyễn Thụy Vân also were not allowed to compete. After that, Dương Trương Thiên Lý, the 2nd Runner-up of Miss Universe Vietnam 2008 was designated to represent Vietnam.

=== Withdrawals ===
- Estonia – Due to lack of funding and sponsorship
- Macedonia – Suzana Al-Salkini withdrew due to lack of funding and sponsorship, but she did compete the following year at Miss World 2009.
- Nepal – The organiser of the Miss Nepal pageant said it was postponing the contest scheduled for 23 August 2008 to an unknown date, after the Maoist women's wing, which has trained its sights on Miss Nepal, announced a Kathmandu Valley shutdown on the day to prevent the event.
- Panama – Kathya Saldaña had problems with the regional organisation and didn't obtain a South African visa in time.
- Romania – Due to lack of funding and sponsorship
- Slovenia – Due to lack of funding and sponsorship
- Suriname – Mireille Nederbiel was not allowed to compete in Miss World by the decision of pageant organizers.
