= Aggeliki Kalaitzi =

Greek model and beauty pageant contestant

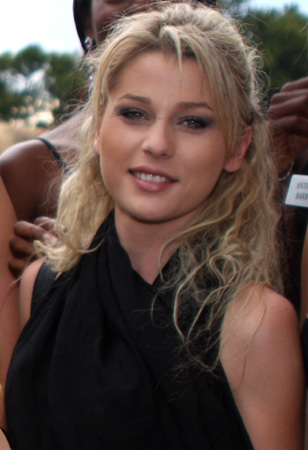
- Aggeliki Kalaitzi in 2008
- Born: Aggeliki Kalaitzi c. 1984; Polygyros, Chalkidiki, Central Macedonia
- Height: 1.73 m (5 ft 8 in)
- Beauty pageant titleholder
- Title: Miss Hellas 2008
- Hair color: Blonde
- Major competitions: Star Hellas 2008; Miss World 2008

Aggeliki Kalaitzi (Greek: Αγγελική Καλαϊτζή; born c. 1984) is a Greek model and beauty pageant titleholder who was crowned Miss Hellas 2008. She represented Greece at the Miss World 2008 pageant.
