= Egla Harxhi =

Albanian beauty pageant contestant

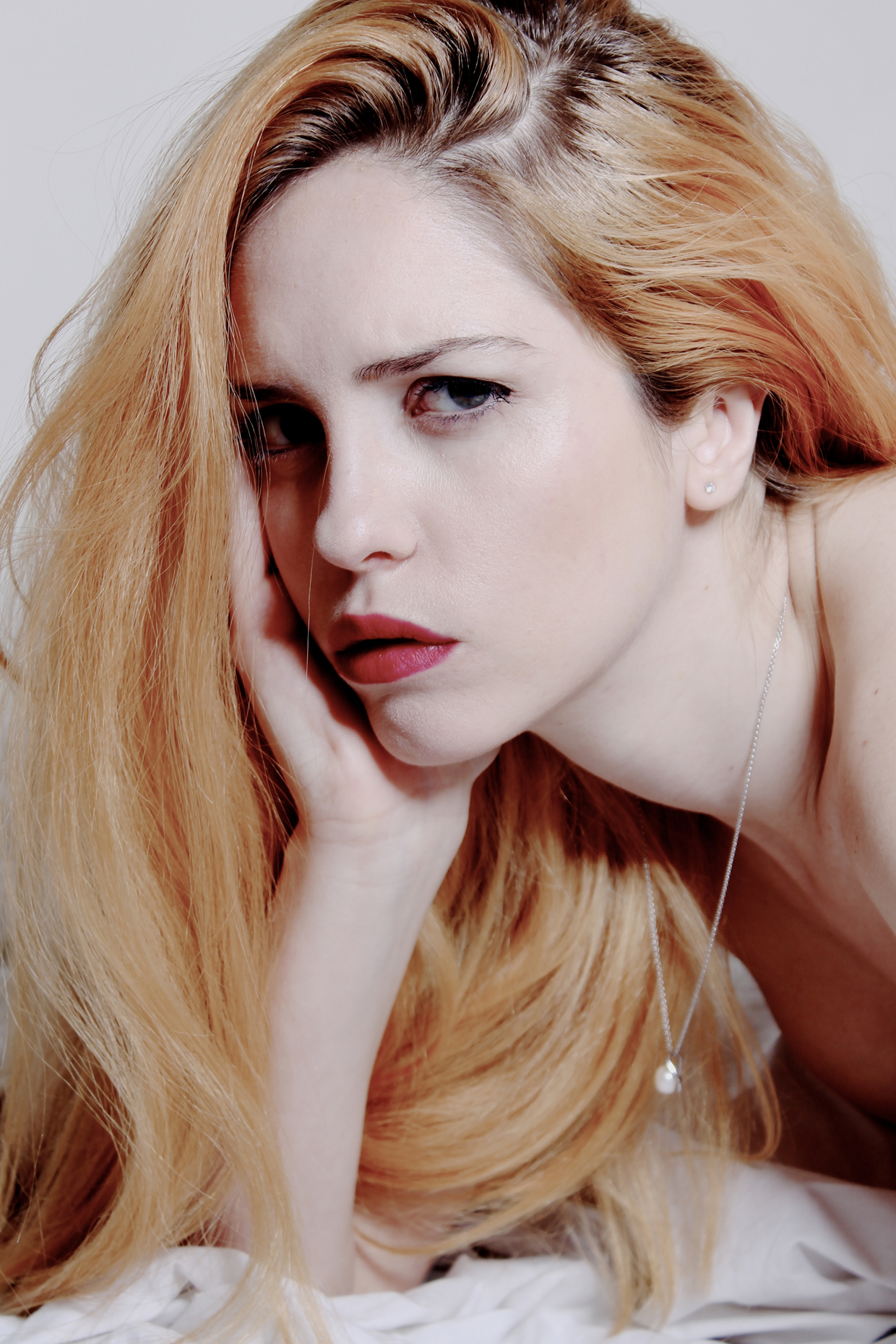
- Born: Egla Harxhi; 1991 (age 34–35); Tirana, Albania
- Occupations: Architect, Actress, Activist
- Height: 1.75 m (5 ft 9 in)
- Beauty pageant titleholder
- Title: Miss World Albania 2007
- Agency: Urban Talents
- Hair color: Red
- Eye color: light Green
- Major competitions: Miss World Albania 2007 (Winner); Miss World 2008 (Unplaced)

Egla Harxhi (born 1991) is an Albanian model and beauty pageant titleholder who won the Miss World Albania 2007 and then represented her country at Miss World 2008. She is the youngest Albanian to win the Miss Albania award and compete in the Miss World pageant. She competed in the 2008 Miss World beauty pageant held in Johannesburg, South Africa. After this experience she stopped her career in modeling and beauty pageants.

== Private life ==
She is married to Alexandre Ale de Basseville. They have a son.
