= Miss Botswana =

Beauty pageant

Miss Botswana Organization
- Formation: 1964; 62 years ago
- Type: Beauty pageant
- Headquarters: Gaborone
- Location: Botswana
- Members: Miss World; Miss Supranational
- Official language: English
- Organization: Botswana Council of Women
- Website: missbotswana.co.bw

Miss Botswana is a national beauty pageant in Botswana.

== History ==
Botswana pageantry runs parallel with the history of the country. Even though there had been beauty contests conducted in various villages around the country in the early 1960s, the first Miss Botswana beauty contest was held in 1967, conducted as part of Botswana independence celebrations.

At the time, it was determined that the colourful first beauty event was going to pick a perfect representative of the nation's modern womanhood. Theresa Rantao became the winner of the Miss Botswana 1967. Earlier in 1964, Veronica Magosi of Lobatse had won the Miss Bechuanaland crown. In 1965 the crown was won by Lydia Tiyo.

Botswana made its debut at Miss World in 1972. Traditionally, the winner of Miss Botswana represents the country at Miss World. Botswana Council of Women is currently in charge for the organization of the contest.

== Titleholders ==
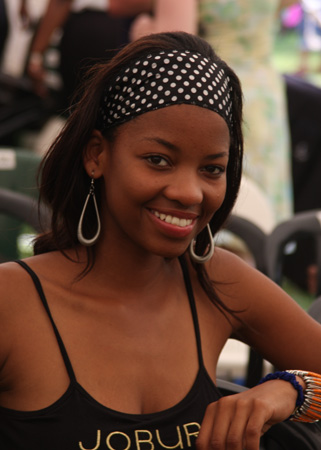
Itseng Kgomotso, Miss Botswana 2007.

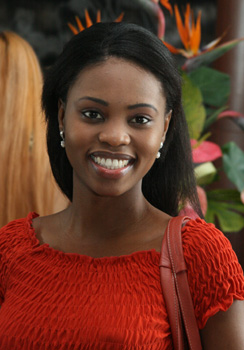
Malebogo Marumogae, Miss Botswana 2006.

Year	Miss Botswana
1962	Serwalo Gaseitsewe
1964	Veronica Magosi
1965	Lydia Tiyo
1967	Theresa Rantao
1968	Veronica Gaosi
1969	Seanokeng Moranyane
1970	Lilian Taunyane
1971	Beauty Seloiso
1972	Agnes Letshebe
1973	Priscilla Molefè
1974	Rosemary Molefi
1975	Lucy Mosinyi
1976	Ida Mpatane
1978	Tshepho Chape
1979	Doris Magula
1980	Kefilwe Maribe
1981	Shalike Kgalaeng
1982	Peggy Lebum
1983	Dineo Ratsatsi
1984	Stella Podile
1985	Keanole Radimo
1986	Boitumelo Matlapeng
1987	Tuduetso Tselayakgosi
1988	Grace Mafoko
1989	Natasha April
1990	Malebogo Kgotso
1991	Shale Ntsima
1992	Boitumelo Ramponye
1993	Mpho Lekoko
1994	Hazel Kutlo Mmopi
1995	Joyce Manase
1996	Monica Semolekae
1997	Mpule Kwelagobe
1998	Earthen Mbulawa
1999	Alimah Isaacs
2000	Punah Serati
2001	Masego Sebedi
2002	Lomaswati Dlamini
2003	Boingotlo Motlalakgosi
2004	Judy Peacock
2005	Lorato Tebogo
2006	Malebogo Marumoagae
2007	Itseng Kgomotso
2009	Sumaiyah Marope
2010	Emma Wareus
2011	Karabo Sampson
2012	Tapiwa Anna-Marie Preston
2013	Rosemary Keofitlhetse
2015	Seneo Mabengano
2016	Thata Kenosi
2017	Nicole Gaelebale
2018	Moitshepi Elias
2019	Oweditse Gofaone Phirinyane
2021	Palesa Molefe
2022	Lesego Chombo
2024	Anicia Gaothusi
2025	Ruth Thomas

== Botswana at International pageants ==
=== Miss World Botswana ===
- : Declared as Winner
- : Ended as runner-up or top 5/6 qualification
- : Ended as one of the finalists or semifinalists
- : Ended as special awards winner

Miss Botswana has started to send a Winner to Miss World. On occasion, when the winner does not qualify (due to age) for either contest, a runner-up is sent.

Year	Miss World Botswana	Placement at Miss World	Special Awards
2027	Magdeline Modipane	TBA	
2026	Ruth Thomas	Unplaced	
2025	Anicia Gaothusi	Top 40	
2023	Lesego Chombo	Top 4	Miss World Africa; Top 25 at Head-to-Head Challenge
2022	Palesa Molefe	Top 40	Head-to-Head Challenge; Top 27 at Miss World Talent; Top 32 at Miss World Sport
Due to the impact of COVID-19 pandemic, no pageant between 2020 and 2021
2019	Oweditse Gofaone Phirinyane	Unplaced	
2018	Moitshepi Elias	Unplaced	
2017	Nicole Lisa Gaelebale	Top 40	
2016	Thata Kenosi	Unplaced	
2015	Seneo Paige Bambino Mabengano	Unplaced	
2014	Did not compete		
2013	Rosemary Keofitlhetse	Unplaced	
2012	Tapiwa Anna-Marie Preston	Unplaced	
2011	Karabo Sampson	Top 20	
2010	Emma Wareus	1st Runner-up	Miss World Africa
2009	Sumaiyah Pandor Marope	Unplaced	
2008	Itseng Kgomotso	Unplaced	
2007	Malebogo Marumoagae	Unplaced	
2006	Lorato Pearl Tebogo	Unplaced	
2005	Tshegofatso Abigail Tumisang Robi	Unplaced	
2004	Juby Peacock	Unplaced	
2003	Boingotlo Motlalekgosi	Unplaced	
2002	Lomaswati Dlamini	Unplaced	
2001	Masego Sebedi	Unplaced	
2000	Puna Keleabetswe Serati	Unplaced	
1999	Alimah Isaacs	Unplaced	
1998	Earthern Pinkinyana Mbulawa	Unplaced	
1997	Mpule Kwelagobe	Unplaced	
1996	Joyce Manase	Unplaced	
1995	Monica Somolekae	Unplaced	
1994	Hazel Kutlo Mmopi	Unplaced	
Did not compete between 1975—1993
1974	Rosemary Moleti	Unplaced	
1973	Priscilla Molefe	Unplaced	
1972	Agnes Motswere Letsebe	Unplaced	

=== Miss Supranational Botswana ===
- : Declared as Winner
- : Ended as runner-up or top 5/6 qualification
- : Ended as one of the finalists or semifinalists
- : Ended as special awards winner

Year	Miss Supranational Botswana	Placement at Miss Supranational	Special Awards
2024	Leah Barobetse	Unplaced	
2023	Dabilo Moses	Top 24	Top 29 at Miss Talent

== See also ==
- Miss Universe Botswana
- Miss Earth Botswana
