= Miss Earth Botswana =

National beauty pageant

- Formation: 2006
- Type: Beauty pageant
- Headquarters: Gaborone
- Location: Botswana
- Members: Miss Earth
- Official language: English; Setswana
- National Director: Tebogo Moagi

Miss Earth Botswana is a national beauty pageant in Botswana that was first held in 2006 with winner will be competing at the Miss Earth pageant. This pageant is not related to the Miss Universe Botswana or Miss Botswana pageants.

== The pageant ==
Botswana made its debut at Miss Earth in 2006. The winner is involved in numerous environmental education initiatives, with more emphasis on educating the general public about the importance of a cleaner and safer environment and involved in tree planting, road safety campaigns, and taking part in the commemoration of environmentally related days such as World Environment Day. Traditionally, the winner of Miss Earth Botswana represents the country at Miss Earth. On occasion, when the winner does not qualify (due to age), a runner-up is sent. The pageant is based in Gaborone and organized by its Country Director, Tebogo Moagi and Publicity Officer, Beatrice Barrows.

Botswana did not compete in 2009 and 2013. Miss Earth Botswana 2009, Tumisang Sebina, was unable to compete in the international pageant since she did not meet the 164 cm (5 ft 4 1/2 in) Miss Earth minimum height requirement. This caused organisers to change the local pageant rules that exclude anyone below the required height, ensuring that Botswana would be represented internationally.

== Titleholders ==
Color key

- Declared as Winner
- Ended as runner-up
- Ended as one of the finalists or semifinalists

Year	Miss Earth Botswana	Placement at Miss Earth
Did not compete in 2022-present
2021	Mosa Dolly Balesamang	Top 20
2020	Seneo Perry	Did not compete
2019	Katlego Seitshiro	
Did not compete between 2015—2018
2014	Nicole Gaelebale	Eco-Beauty Video
Did not compete in 2013
2012	Lorraine Ditsebe	(silver) M.E Greenbag Challenge, (bronze) Liter of Light Project Campaign
2011	Messiah Jackson	
2010	Onalenna Gaopalelwe	
Did not compete in 2009
2008	Nametso Ngwako	
2007	Millicent Ollyn	
2006	Kefilwe Kgosi	

== See also ==
- Miss Universe Botswana
- Miss Botswana
