= Molelekwa =

Molelekwa is a surname. Notable people with the surname include:

- Moses Taiwa Molelekwa (1973–2001), South African jazz pianist
- Sheillah Molelekwa (born 1992), Botswana beauty pageant titleholder
