= Miss and Mister Supranational Vietnam =

Beauty contest

Miss Supranational Vietnam
- Formation: 2018
- Type: Beauty Pageant
- Headquarters: Ho Chi Minh City
- Location: Vietnam
- Members: Miss and Mister Supranational; The Miss Globe; Miss Tourism World
- Official language: Vietnamese
- Key people: Phạm Duy Khánh
- Affiliations: Five6 Entertainment

Miss and Mister Supranational Vietnam (Vietnamese: Hoa hậu và Nam vương Siêu quốc gia Việt Nam) is a beauty pageant in the Vietnam. It was first held in 2018 to look for Vietnamese representatives at the Miss Supranational competition.

The current Miss Supranational Vietnam is Võ Cao Kỳ Duyên from Haiphong and Miss Supranational Vietnam is Hà Quang Trung from Ho Chi Minh City. they was crowned as Miss and Mister Supranational Vietnam 2025 on January 5, 2025.

== Titleholders ==
Year	Miss Supranational Vietnam	1st Runner Up	2nd Runner Up	Venue	Entrants
2018	Nguyễn Thị Ngọc Châu; Tây Ninh	Trương Mỹ Nhân; Hồ Chí Minh City	Hoàng Vũ Hiên; Lâm Đồng	Grand Walkerhill, Seoul, Korea	15

== Vietnam's representatives at international competitions ==
Color keys

- : Declared as Winner
- : Ended as Runner-up or Top 5
- : Ended as Finalists
- : Ended as Semi-finalists

=== Miss Supranational ===
Year	Representative	Residence	National Title	Placement	Special Awards
2026	Ngô Thị Quỳnh Mai	Ho Chi Minh City		Top 12	
2025	Võ Cao Kỳ Duyên	Haiphong		Unplaced	
2024	Lydie Phương Ly Vũ	Ho Chi Minh City	Miss Supranational Vietnam 2024 (Appointed)	Unplaced	
2023	Đặng Thanh Ngân	Sóc Trăng		4th Runner-up	Supra Fan-Vote
2022	Nguyễn Huỳnh Kim Duyên	Cần Thơ		2nd Runner-up	Supra Model of Asia; Supra Chat Winner
2021	Did not compete				
2020	Due to the impact of COVID-19 pandemic, no pageant in 2020				
2019	Nguyễn Thị Ngọc Châu	Tây Ninh	Miss Supranational Vietnam 2018	Top 10	Miss Supranational Asia
2018	Nguyễn Minh Tú	Hồ Chí Minh City		Top 10	Miss Supranational Asia; Best in Evening Gown; Best National Costume
2017	Nguyễn Đình Khánh Phương	Nha Trang		Top 25	Miss Internet
2016	Dương Nguyễn Khả Trang	Hà Giang		Top 25	Best National Costume
2015	Nguyễn Thị Lệ Quyên	Bạc Liêu		Unplaced	Best of Social Media
Did not compete between 2013 — 2014
2012	Lại Hương Thảo	Quảng Ninh		Unplaced	Miss Supranational Asia & Oceania; Miss St. George Hospitality
2011	Daniela Nguyễn Thu Mây	Czech Republic	Appointed	3rd Runner-up	
2010	Did not compete				
2009	Chung Thục Quyên	Hồ Chí Minh City	Appointed	Top 15	Best National Costume; Miss Internet

=== Mister Supranational ===
Year	Representative	Residence	National Title	Placement	Special Awards
2026	Nguyễn Hàn Việt	Khánh Hoà	Mister Supranational Vietnam 2026 (Appointed)	Top 20	
2025	Nguyễn Minh Khắc	Hồ Chí Minh City	Mister Supranational Vietnam 2025 (Appointed)	Top 10	
2024	Đỗ Quang Tuyển	Nam Định	Mister Supranational Vietnam 2024 (Appointed)	Top 10	Mister Supranational Asia; Supra Fan-Vote
2023	Did not competed				
2022	Bùi Xuân Đạt	Hưng Yên	Mister Supranational Vietnam 2022 (Appointed)	Top 10	Mister Supranational Asia
2021	Did not compete				
2020	Due to the impact of COVID-19 pandemic, no pageant in 2020				
2019	Trần Mạnh Khang	Hanoi	Mister Supranational Vietnam 2019 (Appointed)	Top 20	

== See also ==
- List of Vietnam representatives at international women beauty pageants
