= Miss Universe 1999 =

48th Miss Universe pageant

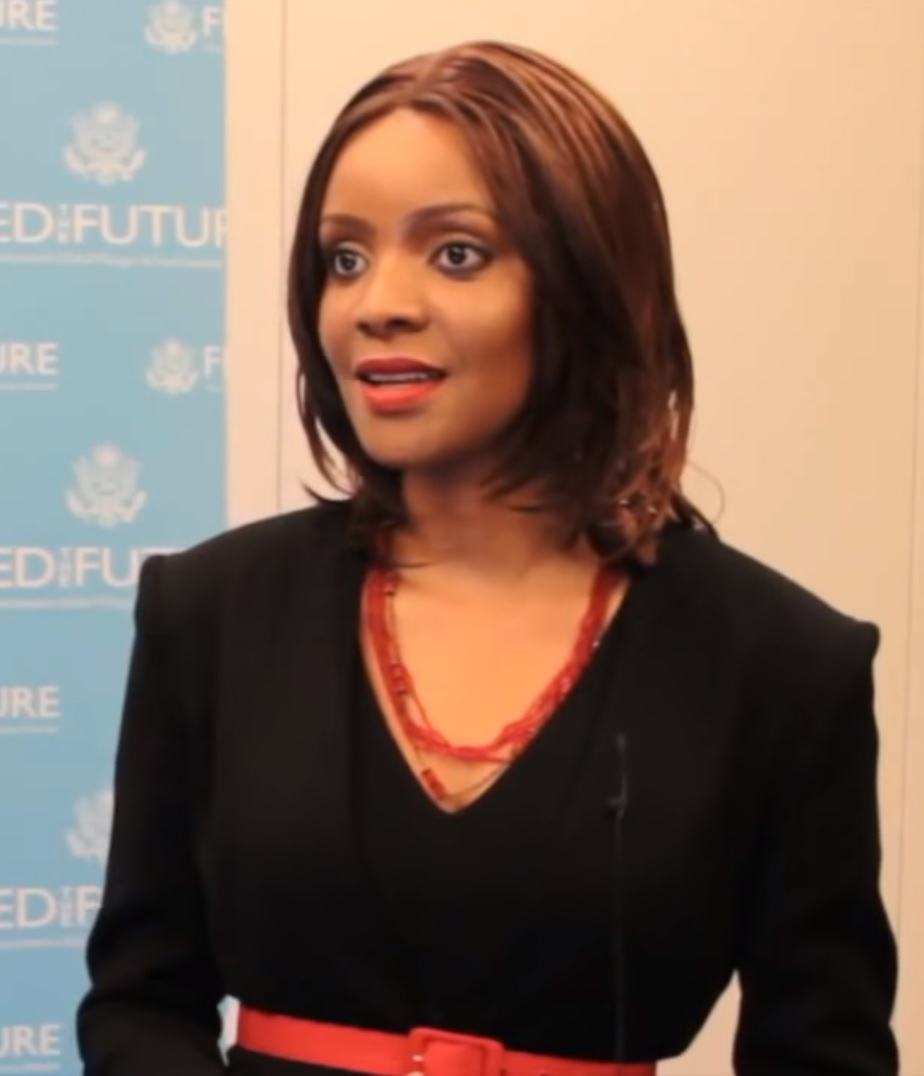
- Mpule Kwelagobe
- Date: 26 May 1999
- Presenters: Jack Wagner; Ali Landry; Julie Moran
- Entertainment: Julio Iglesias Jr.
- Venue: Chaguaramas Convention Centre, Chaguaramas, Trinidad and Tobago
- Broadcaster: CBS (international); Trinidad and Tobago Television (official broadcaster)
- Entrants: 84
- Placements: 10
- Debuts: Botswana
- Withdrawals: Bulgaria; Guam; Netherlands; Norway; Romania; Zimbabwe
- Returns: Austria; Barbados; Cayman Islands; Cook Islands; Guyana; Suriname; Turks and Caicos Islands; Zambia
- Winner: Mpule Kwelagobe; Botswana
- Congeniality: Marisa Ferreira (Portugal)
- Best National Costume: Nicole Dyer (Trinidad and Tobago)
- Photogenic: Brenda Liz López (Puerto Rico)

Miss Universe 1999 was the 48th Miss Universe pageant, held at the Chaguaramas Convention Centre in Chaguaramas, Trinidad and Tobago, on 26 May 1999.

Mpule Kwelagobe of Botswana was crowned by Wendy Fitzwilliam of Trinidad and Tobago at the conclusion of the event.

This edition marks the most recent time that a first-time entry of a country at Miss Universe has won and the third time in pageant's history, after Colombia in 1958 and Finland in 1952. This edition also saw a back-to-back victory by black women. Eighty-four contestants competed in this year.

Miss Universe 1999 Titlecard

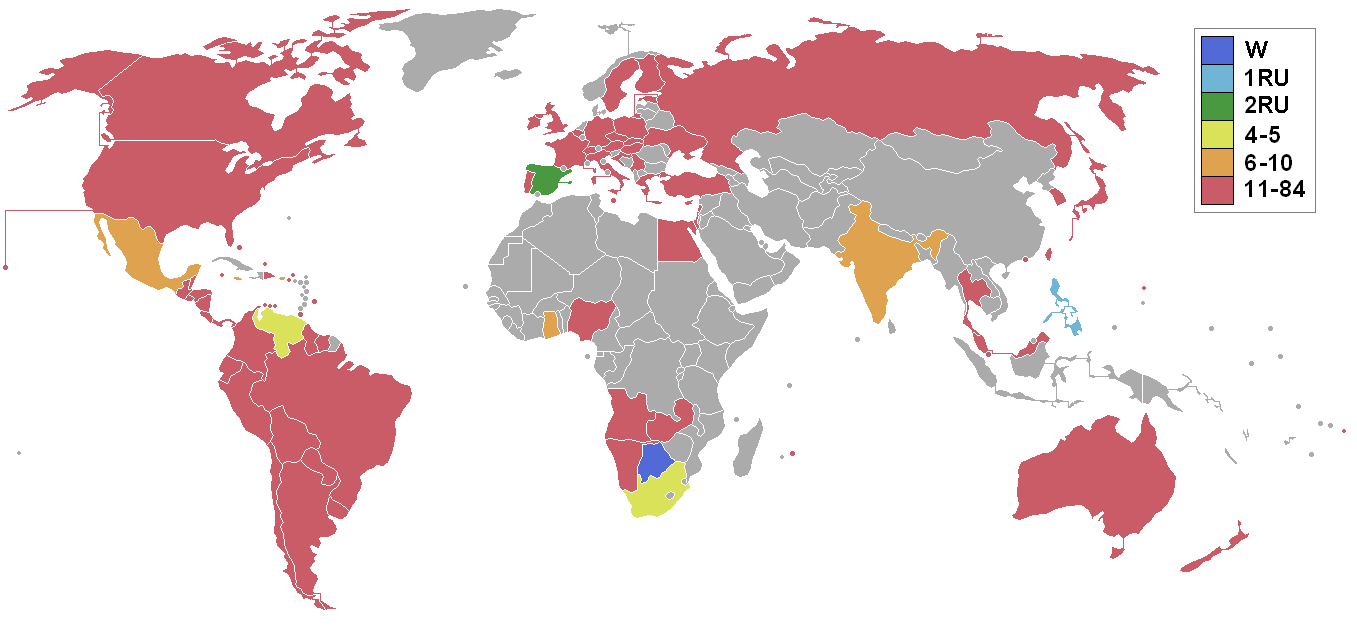
Miss Universe 1999 participating nations and results

== Background ==
=== Selection of participants ===
Contestants from eighty-four countries and territories were selected to compete in the pageant. Five of these delegates were appointed to their titles after either being a runner-up of their national pageant, in an audition process or in an internal selection.

==== Replacements ====
The winner of Miss Great Britain Universe 1999, Nicki Lane, decided to give up the crown to her first runner-up Cherie Pisiani, after Lane confessed that she had a child at 14 years old. The winner of Binibining Pilipinas 1999, Janelle Delfin Bautista, had to resign due to citizenship issues, as she was an American citizen. The Binibining Pilipinas World 1999, Miriam Quiambao, assumed the Binibining Pilipinas Universe title.

== Results ==
=== Placements ===
Placement	Contestant
Miss Universe 1999	Botswana – Mpule Kwelagobe
1st Runner-Up	Philippines – Miriam Quiambao
2nd Runner-Up	Spain – Diana Nogueira
Top 5	South Africa – Sonia Raciti; Venezuela – Carolina Indriago
Top 10	Ghana – Akuba Cudjoe; India – Gul Panag; Jamaica – Nicole Haughton; Mexico – Silvia Salgado; Puerto Rico – Brenda Liz Lopez

== Contestants ==
Eighty-four contestants competed for the title.

Country/Territory	Contestant	Age	Hometown
Angola	Egidia Torres	22	Luanda
Argentina	Elena Fournier	22	Santa Fe
Aruba	Irina Croes	18	Oranjestad
Australia	Michelle Shead	20	Sydney
Austria	Katja Giebner	21	Vienna
Bahamas	Glennis Knowles	25	Nassau
Barbados	Olivia Harding	25	Bridgetown
Belgium	Tanja Dexters	21	Mol
Belize	Viola Jeffery	21	Belmopan
Bolivia	Susana Barrientos	20	Santa Cruz
Bonaire	Julina Felida	21	Kralendijk
Botswana	Mpule Kwelagobe	19	Gaborone
Brazil	Renata Fan	22	Santo Ângelo
British Virgin Islands	Movel Lewis	20	Road Town
Canada	Shannon McArthur	26	Windsor
Cayman Islands	Gemma McLaughlin	19	George Town
Chile	Andrea Muñoz	23	Santiago
Colombia	Marianella Maal	20	Barranquilla
Cook Islands	Tina Vogel	24	Avarua
Costa Rica	Arianna Bolaños	22	Guanacaste
Croatia	Marijana Kuzina	21	Šibenik
Curaçao	Jouraine Ricardo	22	Willemstad
Cyprus	Valentina Dionysiou	19	Nicosia
Czech Republic	Petra Faltynova	20	Prague
Dominican Republic	Luz García	21	Moca
Ecuador	Carolina Alfonso	21	Quito
Egypt	Angie Abdalla	18	Alexandria
El Salvador	Cynthia Cevallos	21	San Salvador
Estonia	Triin Rannat	20	Tallinn
Finland	Vanessa Forsman	22	Porvoo
France	Mareva Galanter	22	Papeete
Germany	Diana Drubig	19	Leipzig
Ghana	Akuba Cudjoe	19	Accra
Great Britain	Cherie Pisani	21	Clacton
Greece	Sofia Raptis	19	Athens
Guatemala	Monica Penedo	19	Sacatepéquez
Guyana	Morvinia Sobers	20	Georgetown
Honduras	Sofia Guerrero	21	Atlántida
Hong Kong	Anne Heung	24	Hong Kong
Hungary	Anett Garami	19	Soltvadkert
India	Gul Panag	20	Chandigarh
Ireland	Vivienne Doyle	22	Galway
Israel	Rana Raslan	21	Haifa
Italy	Gloria Bellicchi	20	Parma
Jamaica	Nicole Haughton	24	Kingston
Japan	Satomi Ogawa	21	Misato
Lebanon	Clémence Achkar	19	Beirut
Malaysia	Jeanette Ooi	23	Kuching
Malta	Dorianne Muscat	21	Qormi
Mauritius	Micaella L'Hortalle	23	Port Louis
Mexico	Silvia Salgado	20	Monterrey
Namibia	Vaanda Katjiuongua	23	Windhoek
New Zealand	Kristy Wilson	20	North Otago
Nicaragua	Liliana Pilarte	23	Managua
Nigeria	Angela Ukpoma	25	Imo
Northern Mariana Islands	Cherilyn Cabrera	24	Saipan
Panama	Yamani Saied	20	Panama City
Paraguay	Carmen Morinigo	22	San Pedro
Peru	Fabiola Lazo	18	Lima
Philippines	Miriam Quiambao	23	Quezon City
Poland	Katarzyna Pakuła	20	Lublin
Portugal	Marisa Ferreira	20	Santarém
Puerto Rico	Brenda Liz Lopez	23	Lares
Russia	Alexandra Petrova†	19	Cheboksary
Singapore	Cheryl Marie Cordeiro	23	Singapore
Slovakia	Aneta Kuklova	19	Lučenec
South Africa	Sonia Raciti	21	Johannesburg
South Korea	Choi Ji-hyun	20	Seoul
Spain	Diana Noguiera	24	Pontevedra
Suriname	Serafija Niekoop	21	Paramaribo
Sweden	Emma-Helena Nilsson	24	Östersund
Switzerland	Sonia Grandjean	19	Dietikon
Taiwan	Wan-Fei Wang	21	Taipei
Thailand	Apisamai Srirangsan	24	Nakhon Pathom
Trinidad and Tobago	Nicole Dyer	25	Diego Martin
Turkey	Oznur Dursun	24	Istanbul
Turks and Caicos Islands	Shantell Stubbs	21	Cockburn Town
Ukraine	Zhanna Pikhulya	18	Kyiv
United States	Kimberly Pressler	21	Las Vegas
United States Virgin Islands	Sherece Smith	25	Charlotte Amalie
Uruguay	Veronica Gonzales	19	Montevideo
Venezuela	Carolina Indriago	18	Valencia
Yugoslavia	Ana Karić	19	Belgrade
Zambia	Esanju Kalopa†	18	Muchinga

=== Withdrawals ===
During the contest:

- Guam – Miss Guam 1999, Tisha Elaine Heflin had to withdraw a few days before the preliminary competition, after being discovered that she was pregnant.
