= Đặng Thanh Ngân =

Vietnamese model and beauty pageant titleholder

- Born: Đặng Thanh Ngân; September 3, 1999 (age 27); Sóc Trăng, Vietnam
- Education: Can Tho University
- Beauty pageant titleholder
- Title: Miss Supranational Vietnam 2023
- Major competitions: Miss Ocean Vietnam 2017 (2nd Runner-Up); Miss Supranational 2023 (4th Runner-Up); Miss Cosmo Vietnam 2025 (Withdraw)

Đặng Thanh Ngân (born September 3, 1999) is a Vietnamese model and beauty pageant titleholder. She was the second runner-up of Miss Ocean Vietnam 2017. She was appointed to represent Vietnam at Miss Supranational 2023 competition, where she finished as fourth runner-up.

== Early life and education ==
Dang was born on September 3, 1999, in Sóc Trăng. She used to study at Can Tho University but she temporarily put it off. In addition, she participated in a professional stage actor training course at Hong Van Drama Theater. She was once crowned Miss Elegance Student of Can Tho City 2017.

== Career ==
=== Miss Ocean Vietnam 2017 ===
Dang first participated in the beauty pageant in 2017 with Miss Ocean Vietnam 2017. At the coronation night, she finished second runner-up behind the eventual winner, Lê Âu Ngân Anh of Tiền Giang.

=== Acting career ===
Dang won the Leading Star Award 2018. With a passion for drama, she participated in a professional stage actor training course at Hong Van Drama Theater. In 2022, she got her first theater role.

=== Miss Supranational 2023 ===
In 2023, she was announced to be the representative of Vietnam at Miss Supranational 2023 to be held in Poland on July 14, 2023. At the end of the competition, Dang was announced as the fourth runner-up, being the third representative from Vietnam to be in the top 5. Andrea Aguilera of Ecuador became the overall winner. Additionally, she won the Supra Fan-Vote award which helped her advance into the Top 12.

Awards and achievements
Preceded by (Venezuela) Ismelys Velásquez	4th Runner-Up Miss Supranational; 2023	Succeeded by (Curaçao) Chanelle De Lau
Preceded by (Kenya) Roleen Mose	Supra Fan-Vote Winner; 2023	Succeeded by (Denmark) Victoria Larsen
Preceded by Nguyễn Huỳnh Kim Duyên	Miss Supranational Vietnam; 2023	Succeeded by Lydie Wache Marie Vu
Preceded by Lê Thị Vân Quỳnh	Miss Ocean Vietnam 2nd Runner-Up; 2017	Succeeded by Hồ Thị Thanh Thủy
