= Sumaiyah Marope =

Motswana model (born c. 1987)

Sumaiyah Pandor Marope (born c. 1987) is a Motswana businesswoman and beauty pageant titleholder who was crowned Miss Botswana 2009. She was crowned at the Gaborone International Conference Center on 2 May. Marope traveled to South Africa to represent her home country at the Miss World 2009 competition, held in Johannesburg on 12 December. She is an avid athlete who competes in the 100-meter race and plays softball, netball, volleyball, and athletics.
