= Miss Mozambique =

- Formation: 2015
- Type: Beauty Pageant
- Headquarters: Maputo
- Location: Mozambique
- Members: Miss Universe; Miss World; Miss Grand International; Miss Supranational
- Official language: Portuguese

Miss Mozambique is a national beauty pageant in Mozambique.

== History ==
Miss Mozambique was founded in 2015.

== Titleholders ==
Color key

- : Declared as Winner
- : Ended as runner-up
- : Ended as one of the finalists or semi-finalists
- : Ended as Special awards winner

Year	Miss Mozambique	Placement	Special awards	Notes
2016	Lidia Maolela	Did not compete		Miss Tourism Mozambique 2013
2018	Irellia Veola	Did not compete		

=== Miss Supranational Mozambique ===
Color key

- : Declared as Winner
- : Ended as runner-up
- : Ended as one of the finalists or semi-finalists
- : Ended as Special awards winner

Year	Miss Supranational Mozambique	Placement at Miss Supranational	Special awards	Notes
2023	Suema Abdul Rachid	Unplaced	Top 29 at Miss Talent	
Did not compete since 2024

=== Miss Grand Mozambique ===
Color key

- : Declared as Winner
- : Ended as runner-up
- : Ended as one of the finalists or semi-finalists
- : Ended as Special awards winner

Year	Miss Grand Mozambique	Placement at Miss Grand International	Special awards	Notes
Did not compete since 2023
2022	Suema Abdul Rachid	Unplaced		
