= Binibining Pilipinas 1999 =

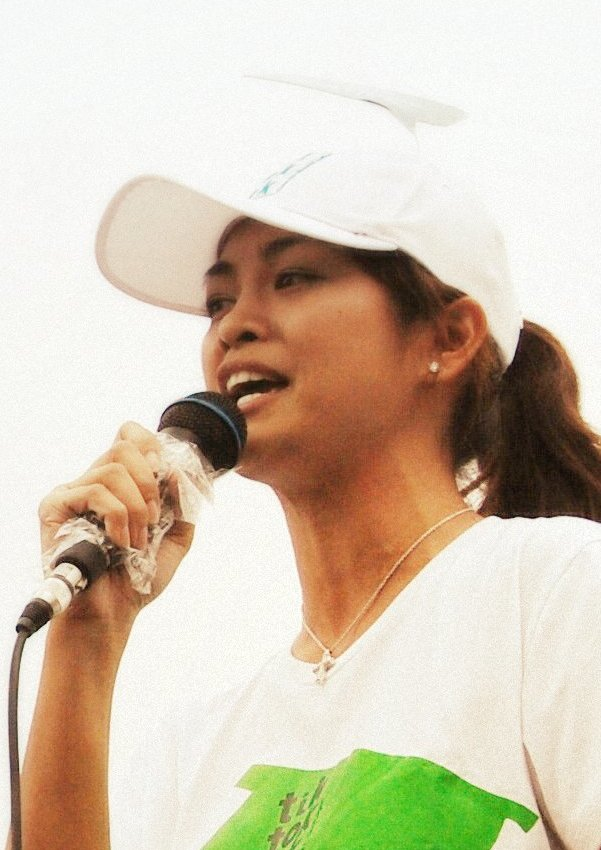
- Miriam Quiambao, Binibining Pilipinas Universe 1999
- Date: February 20, 1999
- Presenters: Paolo Bediones; Ruffa Gutierrez
- Entertainment: Dingdong Dantes; KC Montero; Michael Flores
- Venue: Araneta Coliseum, Quezon City, Philippines
- Broadcaster: GMA Network
- Entrants: 30
- Placements: 10
- Winner: Miriam Quiambao; Quezon City
- Congeniality: Chadrose de Guzman; Pasig
- Photogenic: Miriam Quiambao; Quezon City

Binibining Pilipinas 1999 was the 36th edition of the Binibining Pilipinas pageant, held at the Smart Araneta Coliseum in Quezon City, Metro Manila, Philippines, on February 20, 1999.

At the end of the event, Jewel May Lobaton crowned Janelle Bautista as Binibining Pilipinas Universe 1999, Rachel Soriano crowned Miriam Quiambao as Binibining Pilipinas World 1999, while Colette Centeno crowned Lalaine Edson as Binibining Pilipinas International 1999. Michelle Arcangel was named First Runner-Up, while Joelle Marie Pelaez was named Second Runner-Up.

More than a month after the pageant, Janelle Bautista voluntarily relinquished her title due to a defective passport and citizenship issues and was replaced by Miriam Quiambao as Binibining Pilipinas Universe 1999. Lalaine Edson assumed the title of Binibining Pilipinas World 1999, while Georgina Sandico, one of the 10 semi-finalists, was appointed as Binibining Pilipinas International 1999.

== Results ==
=== Placements ===
Color keys

- The contestant was a Runner-up in an International pageant.
- The contestant did not place.

Placement	Contestant	International Placement
Binibining Pilipinas Universe 1999	Bb. #9 – Janelle Bautista	Resigned due to citizenship issues
Binibining Pilipinas World 1999	Bb. #5 – Miriam Quiambao (Assumed the Binibining Pilipinas Universe 1999 title)	1st Runner-Up – Miss Universe 1999
Binibining Pilipinas International 1999	Bb. #15 – Lalaine Edson (Assumed the Binibining Pilipinas World 1999 title)	Unplaced – Miss World 1999
Binibining Pilipinas International 1999	Bb. #25 – Georgina Anne Sandico (Appointed as Binibining Pilipinas International 1999)	Unplaced – Miss International 1999
1st runner-up	Bb. #28 – Michelle Arcangel	
2nd runner-up	Bb. #2 – Joelle Marie Pelaez	
Top 10	Bb. #18 – Johanna Ruiz; Bb. #22 – Angela Cheryl Penson; Bb. #23 – January Mae Morales; Bb. #25 – Georgina Anne Sandico; Bb. #27 – Joanna Rafbel Serrano	

=== Special awards ===
Award	Contestant
Best In Swimsuit	Bb. #28 – Michelle Arcangel
Best In Evening Gown	Bb. #12 – Jamine Esperat
Miss Photogenic/AGFA	Bb. #5 – Miriam Quiambao
Miss Friendship	Bb. #6 – Chadrose de Guzman
Miss Talent	Bb. #12 – Jamine Esperat
Miss Lux Super Rich	Bb. #15 – Lalaine Edson
Miss Creamsilk	Bb. #5 – Miriam Quiambao
Miss Pond's Beautiful Skin	Bb. #27 – Joanna Rafbel Serrano
Miss Close-Up Smile	Bb. #9 – Janelle Bautista
Miss Internet	Bb. #15 – Lalaine Edson
Binibining Avon	Bb. #28 – Michelle Arcangel
Miss PAL Sunniest Personality	Bb. #5 – Miriam Quiambao
Miss Slimmer's World	Bb. #9 – Janelle Bautista
Miss Supreme Energy	Bb. #6 – Chadrose de Guzman

== Board of Judges ==
- Carlos A. Arellano – Chairman & President, Social Security System
- JV Ejercito – Jaycees' National President
- Martin L. Fernandez – General Marketing Manager, Nokia
- Dieter J. Lonishen – President & managing director, Bayer Philippines
- Marixi Prieto – Chairman of the board, Philippine Daily Inquirer
- Asi Taulava – Professional basketball player
- Michelle Van Eimeren – 1994 Miss Australia
- Alice Lee – National Director, Malaysia/Singapore Pageant Production
- Jaime Dichaves – Vice President for Luzon Basketball Association of the Philippines

== Contestants ==
30 contestants competed for the three titles.

No.	Contestant	Age	Hometown	Placement
1	Myrna Cruz	17	Pateros	
2	Joelle Marie Pelaez	22	Quezon City	2nd Runner-Up
3	Johanna Paula Abinuman	17	Cebu City	
4	Anna May Corveau	21	Bulacan	
5	Miriam Quiambao	23	Quezon City	Binibining Pilipinas World 1999
6	Chadrose de Guzman	18	Pasig	
7	Kathrina Sanchez	19	Pangasinan	
8	Mailene Figueroa	18	Pampanga	
9	Janelle Bautista	22	Quezon City	Binibining Pilipinas Universe 1999
10	Catherine Espiritu	20	Marikina	
11	Evita Bunyi	23	Quezon	
12	Jamine Esperat	21	Quezon City	
13	Maria Christina Pamintuan	22	Davao City	
14	Bernadette Baguyo	18	Pateros	
15	Lalaine Edson	21	Marikina	Binibining Pilipinas International 1999
16	Jaimie Josue	20	Las Piñas	
17	Marilou Silva	18	Lipa	
18	Johanna Ruiz	23	San Juan	Top 10
19	Ethel de Paz	20	Imus	
20	Mia Teodora Tiglao	19	Angeles	
21	Maria Zarifa Alonso	withdrew		
22	Angela Cheryl Penson	20	Parañaque	Top 10
23	January Mae Morales	20	Valenzuela	Top 10
24	Honeylene Laurente	19	Pasig	
25	Georgina Anne Sandico	19	Manila	Top 10
26	Maricris Perez	23	Pasay	
27	Joanna Rafbel Serrano	17	Makati	Top 10
28	Michelle Arcangel	24	Victoria	1st Runner-Up
29	Myrasol Magura	24	San Juan	
30	Jade Ann Diaz	21	San Juan	

== Notes ==
=== Post-pageant notes ===
- After being elevated as Binibining Pilipinas-Universe 1999, Miriam Quiambao competed at the Miss Universe 1999 pageant in Chaguaramas, Trinidad and Tobago, and was named First Runner-Up. Quiambao also won the Clairol Herbal Essence Style Award. Lalaine Edson and Georgina Sandico where also elevated as Binibining Pilipinas-World1999 and Binibining Pilipinas-International 1999, respectively.
- Lalaine Edson competed at Miss World 1999 in London and was unplaced. Georgina Sandico was also unplaced when she competed at the Miss International 1999 pageant in Tokyo, Japan. After her stint at Miss World, Edson never came back to crown her successor and has since stayed in London as a model.
- Jamine Esperat and Joanna Rafbel Serrano competed again at Binibining Pilipinas 2000 and Binibining Pilipinas 2005, respectively. Esperat was unplaced when she competed in 2000, and Serrano was a semifinalist when she competed in 2005.
