= Nicole Griffith =

Former Miss Universe Trinidad and Tobago

Nicole Dyer Griffith is a Trinidadian politician and beauty pageant titleholder who was crowned Miss Universe Trinidad and Tobago 1999 and represented her country at Miss Universe 1999. After her reign as Miss Trinidad and Tobago she moved into the corporate sphere to become the Group Corporate Communications Manager at ANSA McAl Group of Companies. Nicole Dyer Griffith served as Senator and Parliamentary Secretary in the Ministry of Foreign Affairs and Communication.

== Biography ==
Griffith became the Group Corporate Communications Manager at ANSA McAL Group of Companies in Feb 2007 where she remained until Nov 2010. She has also served as the Senator and Parliamentary Secretary In the Ministry of Foreign Affairs and Communication.

Griffith is the former chair of the political party, Congress of the People (COP). She was also the leader of the political party the Alliance of Independents (AOI).

Griffith is the founder of The O2N Foundation, also known as the Oxygen with Nicole Foundation, a non-profit organization. In addition, she is patron of the Diabetes Association of Trinidad and Tobago.

== Personal life ==
Griffith is married to Gary Griffith, the former commissioner of the Trinidad and Tobago Police Service.
