= Dabilo Moses =

Botswana beauty pageant titleholder

- Born: Tutume, Botswana
- Education: Limkokwing University of Creative Technology
- Beauty pageant titleholder
- Title: Miss Independence Botswana 2022; Miss Supranational Botswana 2023; Miss Universe Botswana 2026
- Major competitions: Miss Botswana 2021; (Top 16); Miss Supranational Botswana 2023; (Winner); Miss Supranational 2023; (Top 24); Miss Universe Botswana 2025; (1st Runner-Up); Miss Universe 2026; (TBD)

Dabilo Moses is a Motswana beauty pageant titleholder who won Miss Independence Botswana 2022 and will represent Botswana at Miss Universe 2026.

== Early life and education ==
Dabilo Moses was born in Tutume and raised in Gaborone, Botswana, and is from Maitengwe in northern Botswana.

She is studying for a Bachelor of Arts (Honours) degree in Broadcasting and Journalism at Limkokwing University of Creative Technology in Gaborone.

== Pageantry ==
In 2022, Moses won Miss Independence Botswana 2022. She competed at Miss Botswana 2021, and reached the top 16. She later competed in Miss Botswana 2025, but did not reach the top 25. Moses won Miss Supranational Botswana 2023, and the reached the top 24 at Miss Supranational 2023. It was the first time Botswana had competed at the pageant. Moses was first runner-up at Miss Universe Botswana 2025. She was later selected as Miss Universe Botswana 2026 by the Miss Universe Botswana Organization. She will represent Botswana at the Miss Universe 2026 competition, scheduled to be held in November 2026 in San Juan, Puerto Rico.

Awards and achievements
Preceded by –	Miss Supranational Botswana; 2024	Succeeded by Leah Barobetse
