= Tsaone Macheng =

Botswana beauty pageant titleholder

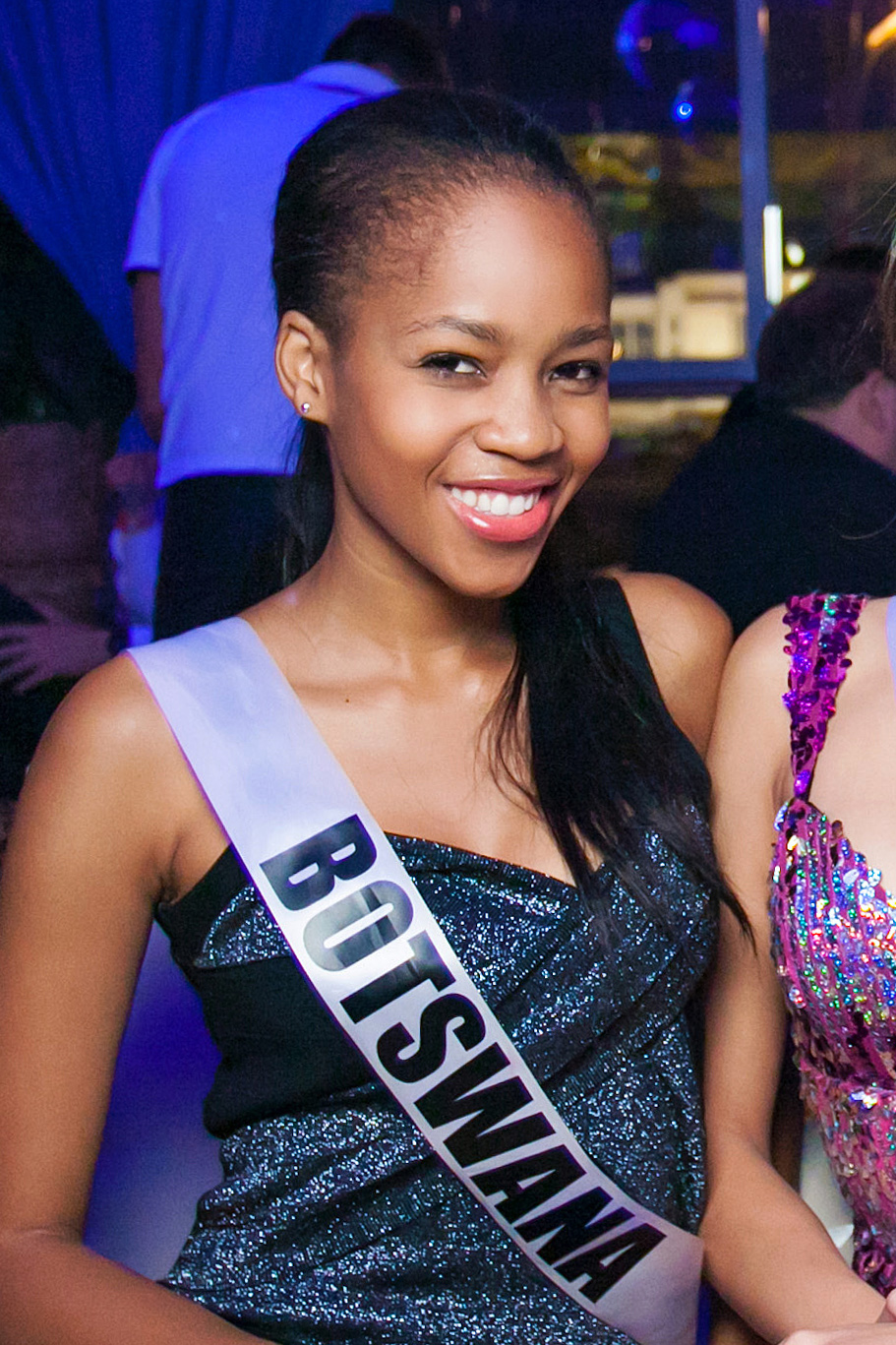
- Born: Tsaone Macheng; November 24, 1989 (age 36); Gaborone, Botswana
- Height: 1.70 m (5 ft 7 in)
- Beauty pageant titleholder
- Title: Miss Universe Botswana 2013
- Hair color: Black
- Major competitions: Miss Universe Botswana 2013 (Winner); Miss Universe 2013 (Unplaced)

Tsaone Macheng (born November 24, 1989) is a Botswana model and beauty pageant titleholder who was crowned Miss Universe Botswana 2013, was represented Botswana at the Miss Universe 2013 pageant.

== Early life ==
Tsaone who currently resides in Port Elizabeth, South Africa where she studies Fine Arts at Nelson Mandela Metropolitan University in South Africa.

== Miss Universe Botswana 2013 ==
Tsaone Macheng emerged as the winner of the Miss Universe Botswana title after winning a pageant held in Gaborone International Conference Center on September 7. Benah Sekgabo was declared as first runner-up while the second runner-up was Boitumelo Kanedi. Tsaone represented Botswana at Miss Universe 2013 pageant in Moscow, Russia on November 9, 2013.

Awards and achievements
| Preceded by Sheillah Molelekwa | Miss Universe Botswana; 2013 | Succeeded by Thanolo Keutlwile |
