= Larona Kgabo =

Botswana model and beauty pageant titleholder

Larona Motlatsi Kgabo
- Born: July 13, 1986 (age 40); Gaborone, Botswana
- Education: University (Degree in Architecture)
- Occupations: Model, Beauty Pageant Titleholder
- Years active: 2011–present
- Known for: Representing Botswana at Miss Universe 2011
- Title: Miss Universe Botswana 2011

Larona Motlatsi Kgabo (born July 13, 1986) is a Botswana model and beauty pageant titleholder who won Miss Universe Botswana 2011.

== Modeling career ==
She was born on July 13, 1986, in Gaborone, the capital and largest city of Botswana. Larona Motlatsi Kgabo was voted in the year 2011 Miss Universe Botswana on July 23, 2011, at the Gaborone International Conference Center. Larona Motlatsi Kgabo was chosen among twelve finalists of the competition.

At the same time that Larona Motlatsi Kgabo was receiving the Miss Universe competition award, she was also graduating from the university after pursuing a degree in architecture.

Larona Motlatsi Kgabo's victory opened up an opportunity for her to be selected as the official representative of Botswana for the international beauty contest Miss Universe in 2011. She represented her country at the event which was held on September 12, 2011, in São Paulo, Brazil.
