= Miss Supranational 2023 =

14th Miss Supranational beauty pageant

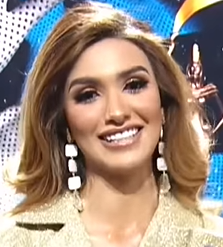
- Andrea Aguilera
- Date: 14 July 2023
- Presenters: Jo-Ann Strauss; Martin Fitch
- Venue: Strzelecki Park Amphitheater, Nowy Sącz, Małopolska, Poland
- Broadcaster: Polsat
- Entrants: 65
- Placements: 24
- Debuts: Botswana; Cayman Islands; Mozambique; United Kingdom
- Withdrawals: Argentina; Chile; China; Denmark; England; France; Ireland; Kazakhstan; Kyrgyzstan; Laos; Lesotho; Malta; Singapore; Uruguay
- Returns: Bahamas; Cameroon; Croatia; Gibraltar; Nicaragua; Togo
- Winner: Andrea Aguilera; Ecuador
- Congeniality: Ayanda Gugulethu Thabethe; South Africa
- Best National Costume: Patraporn Wang; Thailand
- Photogenic: Luciana Martínez; El Salvador

Miss Supranational 2023 was the 14th edition of the Miss Supranational pageant, held at the Strzelecki Park Amphitheater in Nowy Sącz, Lesser, Poland, on 14 July 2023.

At the end of the event, Andrea Aguilera of Ecuador was crowned by Lalela Mswane of South Africa, as Miss Supranational 2023. marking the country's first victory in the history of the pageant.

== Background ==
=== Selection of participants ===
Contestants from sixty-five countries and territories were selected to compete in the pageant. One contestant was selected to replace the original dethroned winner.

On November 23, 2022, it was announced that the Miss Supranational Organization had raised its age limit from 28 to 33, citing a survey conducted among the pageant's national license holders.

==== Replacements ====
Camila Sanabria of Bolivia withdrew for personal reasons and was replaced by Stephanie Terrazas.

==== Debuts, returns, and, withdrawals ====
This edition marked the debuts of Botswana, the Cayman Islands, Mozambique, and the United Kingdom; and the returns of the Bahamas, Cameroon, Croatia, Gibraltar, Nicaragua, ang Togo. Nicaragua, which last competed in 2013; Gibraltar in 2017; Togo in 2018; Cameroon and Croatia in 2019; while the others last competed in 2021.

Argentina, China, Denmark, England, France, Ireland, Kazakhstan, Kyrgyzstan, Laos, Lesotho, Malta, Singapore, and Uruguay withdrew after their respective organizations failed to appoint a delegate, hold a national competition, or lost their national franchise. Although already competed at the Supra Chat event, Francisca Lavandero of Chile withdrew due to difficulties with the Miss Chile Organization.

Three other contestants withdrew from the competition having already competed at the Supra Chat event: Klara Musabelliu of Albania, Anita Mikue of Equatorial Guinea, and Fowzia Abdirashid Abdihakin of Somalia withdrew for personal reasons, the latter due to difficulties with her passport.

== Results ==
=== Placements ===
| Placement | Contestant |
|---|---|
| Miss Supranational 2023 | Ecuador – Andrea Aguilera |
| 1st Runner-up | Philippines – Pauline Amelinckx Δ |
| 2nd Runner-up | Brazil – Sancler Frantz Δ |
| 3rd Runner-up | United Kingdom – Emma Collingridge |
| 4th Runner-up | Vietnam – Đặng Thanh Ngân ★ |
| Top 12 | Dominican Republic – Crystal Matos; Gibraltar – Michelle Lopez Desoisa; India – Pragnya Ayyagari; Mexico – Vanessa López Quijada; Netherlands – Luna-Isabella Stienstra; Peru – Valeria Flórez; Puerto Rico – Camille Fabery |
| Top 24 | Botswana – Dabilo Moses; Colombia – Valentina Mora Trujillo; Curaçao – Andreina Pereira Δ; El Salvador – Luciana Martínez; Indonesia – Yasinta Aurellia; Malaysia – Deidre Walker; Poland – Aleksandra Klepaczka; South Africa – Ayanda Thabethe; Spain – Lola Wilson; Thailand – Patraporn Wang; Venezuela – Selene Delgado; Zimbabwe – Sakhile Dube Δ |

★ – placed into the Top 12 by fan-voting challenge

Δ – placed into the Top 24 by fast-track challenges

=== Continental titleholders ===
| Continent | Contestant |
|---|---|
| Africa | Zimbabwe – Sakhile Dube |
| Americas | Peru – Valeria Flórez |
| Asia | India – Pragnya Ayyagari |
| Caribbean | Curaçao – Andreina Pereira |
| Europe | Gibraltar – Michelle López Desoisa |

=== Special awards ===
| Award | Contestant |
|---|---|
| Best National Costume | Thailand – Patraporn Wang |
| Miss Congeniality | South Africa – Ayanda Thabethe |
| Miss Photogenic | El Salvador – Luciana Martínez |
| Miss Talent | South Korea – Juhyeon Roh |
| Woman of Substance | Philippines – Pauline Amelinckx |

=== Fast track challenges ===
| Challenge | Contestant |
|---|---|
| Supra Chat | Philippines – Pauline Amelinckx |
| Supra Model of the Year | Zimbabwe – Sakhile Dube |
| Supra Influencer | Brazil – Sancler Frantz |
| Supra Fan Vote | Vietnam – Đặng Thanh Ngân |
| Contestants' Choice | Curaçao – Andreina Pereira |

== Challenge events ==
=== Supra Chat ===
The Supra Chat event began on 7 June 2023 and aired on the official YouTube channel of Miss Supranational, where each candidate introduced themselves to a group of six to eight. The winners of each group participated in the second round of the challenge on 9 July 2023, and the candidate who wins the second round will automatically be in the Top 24. Pauline Amelinckx of the Philippines won this challenge.

==== First round ====
- Advanced to the semi-final

| Group | Country 1 | Country 2 | Country 3 | Country 4 | Country 5 | Country 6 | Country 7 | Country 8 |
|---|---|---|---|---|---|---|---|---|
| 1 | Bolivia | Brazil | ~~Chile~~ | Costa Rica | Mozambique | Panama | Portugal | —N/a |
| 2 | ~~Albania~~ | Belgium | Germany | Gibraltar | Greece | Iceland | Netherlands | Romania |
| 3 | Cambodia | India | Malaysia | Nepal | Thailand | Turkey | Vietnam | —N/a |
| 4 | Botswana | Ghana | Kenya | Namibia | South Africa | Zambia | —N/a | —N/a |
| 5 | Colombia | Ecuador | El Salvador | Mexico | Nicaragua | Paraguay | Venezuela | —N/a |
| 6 | Cameroon | Côte d'Ivoire | Guatemala | Haiti | Mauritius | Togo | —N/a | —N/a |
| 7 | Bahamas | Canada | Cayman Islands | Curaçao | Jamaica | Nigeria | Trinidad and Tobago | —N/a |
| 8 | Cuba | Dominican Republic | ~~Equatorial Guinea~~ | Peru | Puerto Rico | Spain | —N/a | —N/a |
| 9 | Croatia | Czech Republic | Finland | Poland | Slovakia | ~~Somalia~~ | United Kingdom | —N/a |
| 10 | Hong Kong | Indonesia | Japan | Philippines | South Korea | Ukraine | United States | Zimbabwe |

==== Final round ====
- Advanced to the Top 24 via Supra Chat.

| Results | Country |
|---|---|
| Winner | Philippines – Pauline Amelinckx |
| Top 5 | Canada – Alexa Marie Grant; India – Pragnya Ayyagari; Peru – Valeria Flórez; South Africa – Ayanda Thabethe |
| Top 10 | Brazil – Sancler Frantz; Haiti – Merlie Fleurizard; Nicaragua – Katherine Burgos Reyes; Romania – Ioana-Izabela Hotăran; United Kingdom – Emma Collingridge |

=== Supra Fan-Vote ===
The Supra Fan-Vote event began on 29 June 2023, and concluded at the pageant on 14 July 2023. The winner of the event will automatically be in the Top 12. Đặng Thanh Ngân of Vietnam won the event.

- Advanced to the Top 12 via Supra Fan-Vote.

| Placement | Contestant |
|---|---|
| Winner | Vietnam – Đặng Thanh Ngân |
| Top 10 | Canada – Alexa Marie Grant; Côte d’Ivoire – Yasmine Wognin; India – Pragnya Ayyagari; Indonesia – Yasinta Aurellia; Japan – Mayuko Hanawa; Malaysia – Deidre Walker; Mozambique – Suema Abdul Rachid; Peru – Valeria Flórez; Philippines – Pauline Amelinckx |

=== Supra Model of the Year ===
Supra Model of the Year was broadcast live via Miss Supranational official YouTube at 6 pm on 9 July 2023. One of the five continental winners will be announced as the winner and be a semi-finalist in the finals.

- Advanced to the top 24 via Supra Model of the Year

| Placement | Contestant | |
|---|---|---|
| Winner | Zimbabwe – Sakhile Dube | |
| Continental Winners | Africa | Zimbabwe – Sakhile Dube |
| Continental Winners | Americas | Colombia – Valentina Mora Trujillo |
| Continental Winners | Asia | Thailand – Patraporn Wang |
| Continental Winners | Caribbean | Bahamas – Maliqué Maranda Bowe |
| Continental Winners | Europe | Czech Republic – Marie Jedličková |
| Top 10 | Côte d’Ivoire – Yasmine Wognin; Malaysia – Deidre Walker; Puerto Rico – Camille Fabery; Spain – Lola Wilson; United States – Rylee Spinks | |

=== Miss Supra Influencer ===
The Miss Influencer challenges started on 14 June 2023 at 1:00 pm. The first social media challenge began on their official Facebook page and was followed by their Instagram account on June 15; each challenge will last five days. Influencer Challenge 4 took place on Facebook, which started on Sunday, 25 June, at 9:00 am, and ended on Monday, 26 June, at 6:00 pm. Only non-qualifying delegates were eligible in the next two rounds.

| Final Results | | Country | Ref. |
|---|---|---|---|
| Winner | | Brazil – Sancler Frantz | |
| Top 7 | Challenge 1 (Facebook) | Vietnam – Đặng Thanh Ngân | |
| Top 7 | Challenge 2 (Instagram) | Mexico – Vanessa López Quijada; Paraguay – Fabiola Martínez | |
| Top 7 | Challenge 3 (Youtube) | Philippines – Pauline Amelinckx | |
| Top 7 | Challenge 4 (Facebook) | Canada – Alexa Marie Grant | |
| Top 7 | Challenge 5 (Instagram) | Brazil – Sancler Frantz; Indonesia – Yasinta Aurellia | |

=== Miss Talent ===
Twenty-nine talent entries were presented on Miss Supranational official YouTube channel on June 19, and votes were cast. The Top 7 entries were chosen by online voting. On the day of the talent show, Miss Canada, Alexa Marie Grant, was added to the line-up as a request by the official host hotel.

The final eight competed in the first Supra Talent 2023 finals with Mister Supranational 2023 Talent Finalists, broadcast live via Miss & Mister Supranational official YouTube at 10 pm on 9 July 2023.

| Results | Country | Ref. |
|---|---|---|
| Winner | South Korea – Juhyeon Roh | |
| Top 8 | Bahamas – Maliqué Maranda Bowe; Canada – Alexa Marie Grant; Hong Kong – Vinci Yuk Yu Chan; Iceland – Ísabella Þorvaldsdóttir; India – Pragnya Ayyagari; Japan – Mayuko Hanawa; Malaysia – Deidre Walker | |
| Top 29 | Botswana – Dabilo Moses; Cambodia – Chily Tevy; Cuba – Monica Aguilar; Curaçao – Andreina Pereira; Czech Republic – Marie Jedličková; Gibraltar – Michelle Lopez Desoisa; Guatemala – Naida Estubier; Indonesia – Yasinta Aurellia; Jamaica – Thalia Malcolm; Mexico – Vanessa López Quijada; Mozambique – Suema Abdul Rachid; Nepal – Sama Parajuli; Netherlands – Luna-Isabella Stienstra; Paraguay – Fabiola Martínez; Peru – Valeria Flórez; Portugal – Elodie Lopes; Thailand – Patraporn Wang; Trinidad and Tobago – Cadiesha Joseph; Turkey – Selin Erberk Gürdikyan; Ukraine – Alina Liashuk; Zimbabwe – Sakhile Dube | |

== Pageant ==
=== Panel of experts ===
- Luis Daniel Gálvez – Mister Supranational 2022 from Cuba
- Srinidhi Shetty – Miss Supranational 2016 from India
- Lalela Mswane – Miss Supranational 2022 from South Africa
- Adinda Cresheilla – Miss Supranational 2022 third runner-up from Indonesia (preliminary judge)
- Andre Sleigh – Creative director of the Miss and Mister Supranational (preliminary judge)
- Gerhard Patzutka Von Lipinski – president of the Miss and Mister Supranational organisation (final telecast judge)
- Marcelina Zawadzka – television host, model and Miss Polonia 2011 (final telecast judge)
- Robert Czepiel – General Director of Jubiler Schubert / World of Amber (final telecast judge)
- Shontelle – singer and songwriter from Barbados (final telecast judge)

== Contestants ==
Sixty-five contestants competed for the title.

| Country/Territory | Contestant | Age (Note: Ages at the time of the pageant) | Hometown | Continental Group |
|---|---|---|---|---|
| (The Bahamas) Bahamas | Maliqué Maranda Bowe | 22 | Grand Bahama | Caribbean |
| Belgium | Jana Meskens | 21 | Sint-Amands | Europe |
| Bolivia | Stephanie Terrazas | 27 | Cochabamba | Americas |
| Botswana | Dabilo Moses | 22 | Gaborone | Africa |
| Brazil | Sancler Frantz | 32 | Arroio do Tigre | Americas |
| Cambodia | Chily Tevy | 26 | Phnom Penh | Asia |
| Cameroon | Kevine Ghomba | 27 | Douala | Africa |
| Canada | Alexa Marie Grant | 21 | Toronto | Americas |
| Cayman Islands | Melissa Bridgemohan | 25 | West Bay | Caribbean |
| Colombia | Valentina Mora | 25 | Medellín | Americas |
| Costa Rica | Margaret Gray | 21 | San José | Americas |
| (Ivory Coast) Côte d'Ivoire | Yasmine Wognin | 23 | Abidjan | Africa |
| Croatia | Anetta Rajkovic | 19 | Vinkovci | Europe |
| Cuba | Monica Aguilar | 24 | Camagüey | Caribbean |
| Curaçao | Andreina Pereira | 28 | Willemstad | Caribbean |
| Czech Republic | Marie Jedličková | 25 | Štěchovice | Europe |
| Dominican Republic | Crystal Matos | 26 | Santo Domingo | Caribbean |
| Ecuador | Andrea Aguilera | 22 | Ventanas | Americas |
| El Salvador | Luciana Martínez | 24 | Santa Ana | Americas |
| Finland | Linda Heinonen | 21 | Helsinki | Europe |
| Germany | Maria Ignat | 24 | Frankfurt | Europe |
| Ghana | Helen Demey Matey | 28 | Somanya | Africa |
| Gibraltar | Michelle Lopez Desoisa | 23 | Westside | Europe |
| Greece | Maria Cholidou | 22 | Thessaloniki | Europe |
| Guatemala | Naida Estubier | 23 | Paris | Americas |
| Haiti | Merlie Fleurizard | 31 | Port-au-Prince | Caribbean |
| Hong Kong | Vinci Yuk Yu Chan | 28 | Hong Kong | Asia |
| Iceland | Ísabella Þorvaldsdóttir | 20 | Garðabær | Europe |
| India | Pragnya Ayyagari | 21 | Hyderabad | Asia |
| Indonesia | Yasinta Aurellia | 19 | Sidoarjo | Asia |
| Jamaica | Thalia Malcolm | 27 | Kingston | Caribbean |
| Japan | Mayuko Hanawa | 27 | Shimotsuma | Asia |
| Kenya | Martha Mwikali | 29 | Mariakani | Africa |
| Malaysia | Deidre Walker | 28 | Tambunan | Asia |
| Mauritius | Nilmani Hurlall | 23 | Mahébourg | Africa |
| Mexico | Vanessa López Quijada | 28 | Nogales | Americas |
| Mozambique | Suema Abdul Rachid | 26 | Montepuez | Africa |
| Namibia | Romiley Hoffmann | 21 | Windhoek | Africa |
| Nepal | Sama Parajuli | 22 | Pokhara | Asia |
| Netherlands | Luna-Isabella Stienstra | 20 | Heerlen | Europe |
| Nicaragua | Katherine Burgos Reyes | 22 | Tipitapa | Americas |
| Nigeria | Genevieve Ukatu | 27 | Nnewi | Africa |
| Panama | Jillyan Chue | 27 | Colón | Americas |
| Paraguay | Fabiola Martínez | 30 | Villarrica | Americas |
| Peru | Valeria Flórez | 26 | Lima | Americas |
| Philippines | Pauline Amelinckx | 27 | Tubigon | Asia |
| Poland | Aleksandra Klepaczka | 23 | Brójce | Europe |
| Portugal | Elodie Lopes | 23 | Lisbon | Europe |
| Puerto Rico | Camille Fabery | 26 | Cataño | Caribbean |
| Romania | Ioana-Izabela Hotăran | 20 | Arad | Europe |
| Slovakia | Simona Leskovská | 32 | Bratislava | Europe |
| South Africa | Ayanda Gugulethu Thabethe | 23 | Pietermaritzburg | Africa |
| South Korea | Juhyeon Roh | 22 | Seoul | Asia |
| Spain | Lola Wilson | 18 | Málaga | Europe |
| Thailand | Patraporn Wang | 28 | Bangkok | Asia |
| Togo | Mathilde Honyiglo | 28 | Lomé | Africa |
| Trinidad and Tobago | Cadiesha Joseph | 28 | Gasparillo | Caribbean |
| Turkey | Selin Erberk Gürdikyan | 23 | Istanbul | Europe |
| Ukraine | Alina Liashuk | 29 | Rivne Oblast | Europe |
| United Kingdom | Emma Rose Collingridge | 25 | Suffolk | Europe |
| United States | Rylee Spinks | 22 | Sparks | Americas |
| Venezuela | Selene Delgado | 27 | Guatire | Americas |
| Vietnam | Đặng Thanh Ngân | 24 | Sóc Trăng | Asia |
| Zambia | Candy Mathews | 33 | Lusaka | Africa |
| Zimbabwe | Sakhile Dube | 26 | Harare | Africa |
