= Mpule Kwelagobe =

Botswana businesswoman, model, and beauty queen

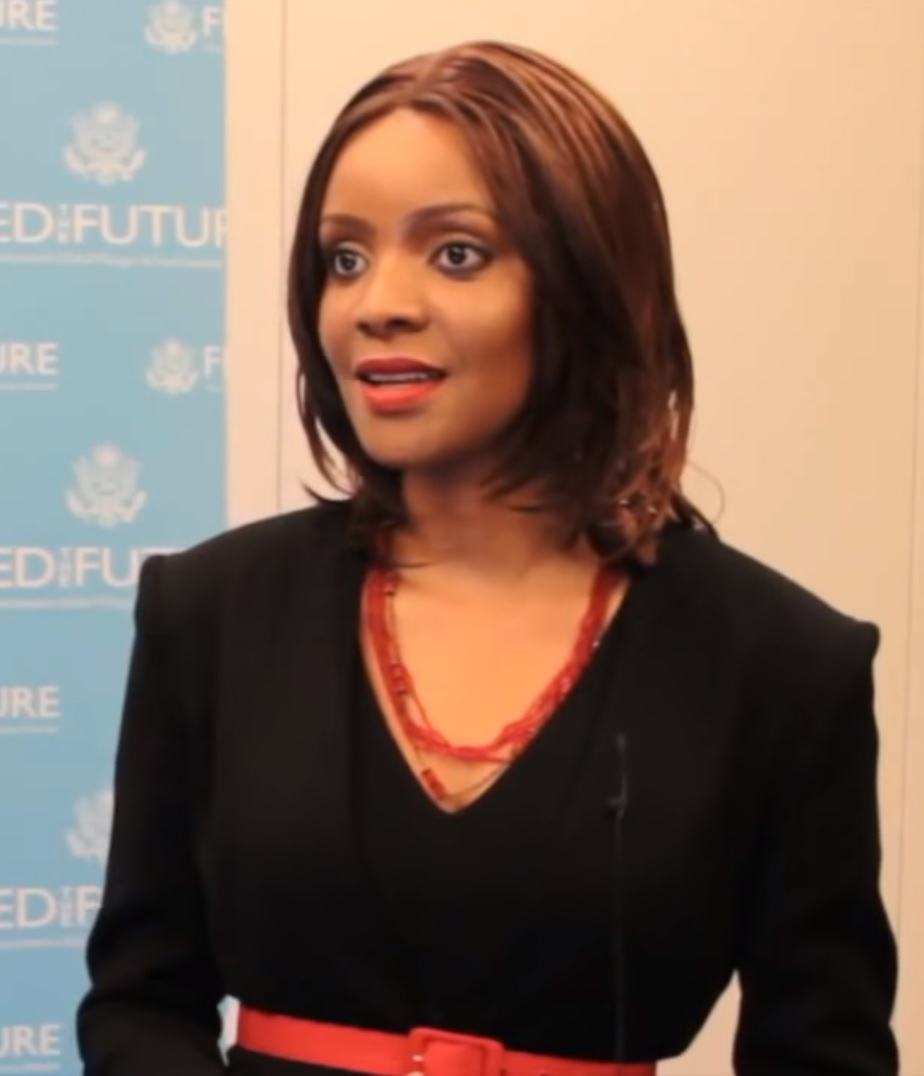
- Kwelagobe in 2013
- Born: Mpule Keneilwe Kwelagobe; 14 November 1979 (age 46); Gaborone, Botswana
- Education: Columbia University
- Height: 1.78 m (5 ft 10 in)
- Spouse: Abhijoy Gandhi (m. 2015)
- Beauty pageant titleholder
- Title: Miss Botswana 1997; Miss Universe Botswana 1999; Miss Universe 1999
- Hair color: Black
- Eye color: Brown
- Major competitions: Miss World 1997 (Unplaced); Miss Universe 1999 (Winner)

Mpule Keneilwe Kwelagobe (born 14 November 1979) is a Motswana investor, businesswoman, model, and beauty queen who was crowned Miss Universe 1999. She was the first black African woman to win one of the Big Four international beauty pageants, the first woman from Botswana to win, and the first from a nation making their debut in nearly four decades, as well as the third African woman to win a Miss Universe title. Kwelagobe had previously been crowned Miss Botswana 1997 and Miss Universe Botswana 1999, and competed in Miss World 1997.

Kwelagobe has been recognized as a human health rights activist, especially for her fight against HIV/AIDS and advocacy for youth and women to have greater access to sexual reproductive education and services. She is the co-founder of QuesS Capital LLC, a private equity firm with investments in financial services, renewable energy and agriculture in Africa and South Asia.

== Early life and education ==
Kwelagobe was born on 14 November 1979 in Gaborone. She comes from the Tswana ethnic group, and her native language is Tswana. Kwelagobe attended Lobatse Senior Secondary School in Lobatse, and Columbia University in New York City, graduating with a degree in international political economy. She began her education at Columbia in 2002, two years after finishing her reign as Miss Universe.

== Career ==
=== Modeling and pageantry ===
Kwelagobe began her career in modeling and pageantry as a teenager. In 1997, she entered Miss Botswana 1997 while still a high school student. She became the youngest woman to win Miss Botswana, at only 17. As Miss Botswana, Kwelagobe represented Botswana at Miss World 1997 in Mahé, Seychelles, where she was unplaced.

Kwelagobe returned to pageantry two years later, being crowned Miss Universe Botswana 1999, becoming the inaugural holder of the title. She subsequently became the first woman to represent Botswana in the Miss Universe competition, competing in Miss Universe 1999 in Chaguaramas, Trinidad and Tobago. Kwelagobe advanced to the top ten, then the top five, and was ultimately declared the winner of the competition, ahead of first runner-up Miriam Quiambao of the Philippines and second runner-up Diana Nogueira of Spain. With her win, Kwelagobe became the fourth black woman to win Miss Universe, the first black African to win any of the Big Four international beauty pageants, and the first woman from Botswana to win a major international title.

=== Post-pageantry ===
After finishing her reign as Miss Universe, Kwelagobe enrolled in Columbia University and graduated with a degree in international political economy. In 2000, Kwelagobe was made a goodwill ambassador by the United Nations, focusing on youth and HIV/AIDS. She addressed the World Summit on Sustainable Development, the Least Developed Countries conference, the World Youth Summit, and the United States House Committee on Financial Services regarding the HIV/AIDS epidemic. Kwelagobe testified on the socioeconomic impact of HIV/AIDS in Africa and proposed a bill to set up a World Bank AIDS prevention trust fund.

In November 2000, Kwelagobe launched the MPULE Foundation and continued to tour her country (Botswana) to promote behavioral change among the youth. The tour aimed to curb the spread of HIV/AIDS, while also advocating access to sexual and reproductive rights for women and youths.

In 2001, Kwelagobe received the Jonathan Mann Health Human Rights Award by the International Association of Physicians in AIDS Care (IAPAC). In 2003, she was selected as a Global Leader for Tomorrow (GLT) by the World Economic Forum, and in 2006, she was selected by the same organisation as a Young Global Leader (YGL).

In 2011, Kwelagobe founded the MPULE Institute for Endogenous Development, a New York City-based advocacy. The institute strives to champion public policy and is a think tank for green initiatives, sustainable development in agriculture, gender equity, and women's and youth empowerment.

In 2015, Kwelagobe signed an open letter which the ONE Campaign had been collecting signatures for; the letter was addressed to Angela Merkel and Nkosazana Dlamini-Zuma, urging them to focus on women as they serve as the head of the G7 in Germany and the African Union in South Africa respectively. Kwelagobe sits on the board of the African Institute for Mathematical Sciences, a pan-African network of Centers of Excellence in mathematical sciences founded by 2008 TED Prize winner and quantum physicist, Professor Neil Turok.

Awards and achievements
Preceded by (Trinidad and Tobago) Wendy Fitzwilliam	Miss Universe; 1999	Succeeded by (India) Lara Dutta
Preceded by Inaugural holder	Miss Universe Botswana; 1999	Succeeded by Joyce Molemoeng
