= Seneo Perry =

Botswanan model and environmentalist

Seneo Perry is a New Zealand-Botswana model, environmentalist and beauty pageant titleholder. She was crowned Miss Earth Botswana 2020.

== Background ==
Seneo Perry was born in Botswana in 1996. She grew up in Gaborone, Botswana. Perry comes from the central part of Botswana. She attained a degree in Entrepreneurial Business Leadership from Sheffield Hallam University (BAC). Perry started her modeling career in 2011 when she was in high school where she joined Miss Rainbow High School during her first year and won the title. In 2019 she joined Miss Earth Botswana and made it to the top 5 winning Best Project category that year. She then won the Miss Earth Botswana crown the following year in 2020 and went on to represent Botswana at Miss Earth 2020. In 2021 she was nominated for Botswana Youth Awards. She then moved to New Zealand and in 2022 she started brand influencing for Oscar Wylee Eyewear and Casetify through her agency Sharon Power. She is the founder of the #PeopleWildLifeEnvironmentMovement where she sensitises the importance of wildlife conservation as well as historical heritage sites around Botswana.
