= Itseng Kgomotso =

Former Miss Botswana-2007

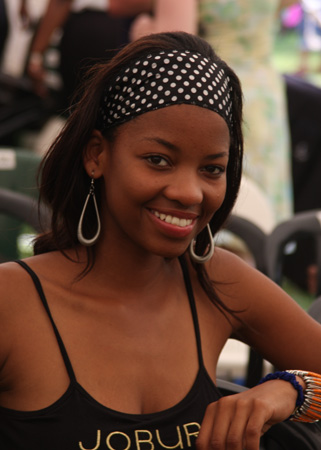
- Born: Itseng Kgomotso; 1989 (age 36–37); Ngwaketse, Botswana
- Beauty pageant titleholder
- Title: Miss Botswana 2008

Itseng Kgomotso is a Motswana model and beauty pageant titleholder who represented Botswana in Miss World 2008 in South Africa. She studied for a degree in arts in the University of Botswana. In July 2010 she was the second princess at the Miss Universe Botswana beauty pageant. In October 2010 she won the Toyota Kickoff Soccerbabes model search, becoming the first citizen of Botswana to ever win the competition.
