= Miriam Quiambao =

Filipino actress, beauty pageant titleholder

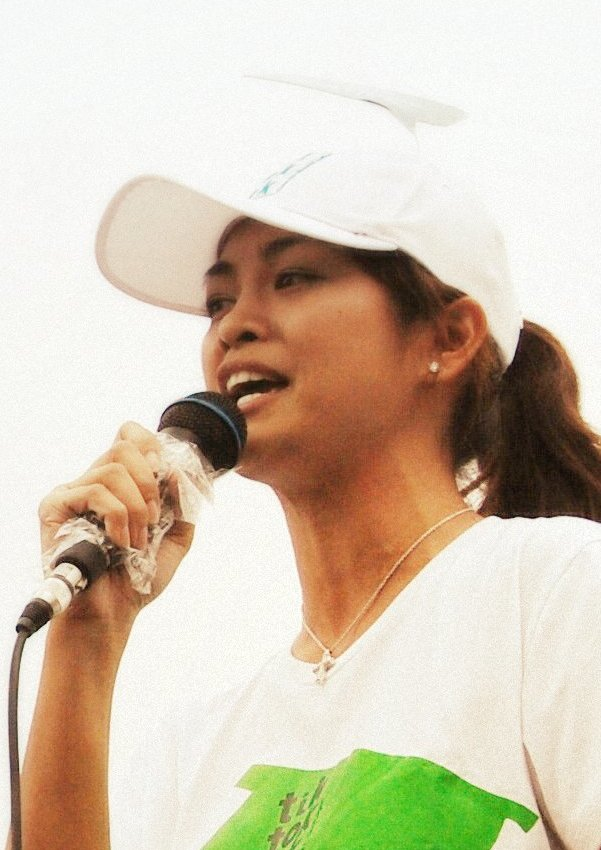
- Quiambao in 2009
- Born: Miriam Redito Quiambao; May 20, 1975 (age 51); Quezon City, Philippines
- Education: University of Santo Tomas, (Physical Therapy)
- Height: 5 ft 7 in (170 cm)
- Spouses: Claudio Rondinelli (m. 2004; div. 2006) Eduardo Roberto, Jr. (m. 2014)
- Children: 2
- Beauty pageant titleholder
- Title: Binibining Pilipinas Universe 1999^{[note 1]}
- Major competitions: Binibining Pilipinas 1999; (Winner – Binibining Pilipinas World 1999); Miss Universe 1999; (1st Runner-Up)

Miriam Redito Quiambao-Roberto (Tagalog pronunciation: [kjɐmˈbaʊ], born May 20, 1975) is a Filipina actress, television host, and beauty pageant titleholder who was crowned Binibining Pilipinas Universe 1999 and placed first runner-up at Miss Universe 1999. She is currently one of the co-hosts of The 700 Club Asia

== Early life ==
Miriam Redito Quiambao was born on May 20, 1975, in Quezon City to Medgardo Quiambao of Bacacay, Albay, and Magdalena (née Redito) of Oas, Albay, and is the first of two children. She attended the School of the Holy Spirit of Quezon City during her elementary and high school years and went for her collegiate studies at the University of Santo Tomas, where she obtained her degree in Physical therapy. She is also a licensed physical therapist for the state of Indiana in the United States. Before Binibining Pilipinas, Quiambao had a career as a therapist for St. Luke's Hospital in Manila. She also worked as an instructor for a local gym.

== Pageantry ==
=== Binibining Pilipinas 1999 ===
Quiambao entered Binibining Pilipinas 1999, and won the title. She won several awards, including Miss Photogenic. When Binibining Pilipinas Universe titleholder Janelle Bautista lost her title to a citizenship issue, Quiambao took over and became the Philippine representative to Miss Universe 1999 in Trinidad and Tobago. Lalaine Edson took on Quiambao's previous Binibining Pilipinas 1999 title.

=== Miss Universe 1999 ===
Quiambao competed at Miss Universe 1999 reaching first Runner-up, with Mpule Kwelagobe of Botswana winning the title. At the semi-finals, she reached second overall in the swimsuit and evening gown competitions. She won the Clairol Herbal Essences Style Award.

== Television and film ==
After Miss Universe 1999, Quiambao began working as a TV host/correspondent for GMA Network in the Philippines. In December 1999, she co-hosted Unang Hirit with Arnold Clavio, Lyn Ching-Pascual, Suzi Entrata-Abrera, Mickey Ferriols and Ryan Agoncillo. Quiambao hosted a lifestyle segment of the show called Istayl.

In 2002, Quiambao appeared in a Mister Donut Twist commercial, where she reprised her fall at Miss Universe 1999.

She joined Paolo Bediones as a host on Extra, Extra, which eventually evolved into a reality program called Extra Challenge. She briefly hosted All About You, a show about women and good values, and fulfilled her dream of having her own talk show.

In 2006, she presented a travel show, Pinoy Meets World with Paolo Bediones. In the same year, Quiambao co-hosted the show Palaban on GMA 7 with Winnie Monsod and Malou Mangahas tackling current events, socio-economic and political issues in the Philippines. In 2007, she also hosted for QTV 11's Dahil Sa Iyong Paglisan, a made for TV show highlighting the experiences, trials and success of Overseas Filipino Workers.

During the first anniversary of 100% Pinoy!, she was one of the new hosts with Joaquin Valdez. She was also the co-host for The Beat (formerly Sapulso) on QTV with journalist/newscaster Ivan Mayrina.

In the second half of 2009, Quiambao appeared in a Philippine horror movie Patient X as Nurse Betty, and the comedy movie Kimmy Dora as Gertrude. She also appeared on television through the TV series Kung Tayo'y Magkakalayo as Aludra, the guest villain for the series.

In 2011, she played Josie/Alonah in the fantasy series Bangis on TV5. She played Maxene in the sitcom The Jose and Wally Show Starring Vic Sotto. In that same year, she had a cameo role as Ryan Agoncillo's boss in the movie House Husband: Ikaw Na!.

In 2023, she is one of the co-hosts of The 700 Club Asia.

== Controversy ==
Quiambao was criticized by the LGBT community in the Philippines in early 2012 over her remarks about homosexuality on the current affairs talk show The Bottomline with Boy Abunda. She said on a Twitter post, "Homosexuality is not a sin but it is a lie from the devil." This caused a huge backlash with openly gay Filipino celebrities, with the rest of the entertainment industry criticizing her for such a "closed-minded" statement. She has since apologized for "not being sensitive" on Twitter.

== Personal life ==
In January 2004, she married Italian businessman Claudio Rondinelli, and lived in Hong Kong. Their marriage ended in divorce in 2006, with Quiambao returning to the Philippines. In 2013, she became engaged to Eduardo "Ardy" Roberto Jr., a Christian author and motivational speaker. They were married on March 25, 2014, and have two children, and one from Roberto's previous marriage. While pregnant, she was diagnosed with Antiphospholipid syndrome. Quiambao's autobiography, He Can Catch You When You Fall, was published in 2015.

In 2022, the family settled in Boracay. The couple celebrated their 10th wedding anniversary on March 24, 2024, before Pastor Joby Soriano at The Palms Country Club in Alabang, Muntinlupa. Quiambao had an asymmetrical wedding gown, while Roberto was in his off-white coat and white shirt.

== Awards ==
Year	Award	Category	Nominated work	Role	Result
2001	15th PMPC Star Awards for Television	Best Morning Show Host	Unang Hirit	Host	Won
2002	16th PMPC Star Awards for Television	Best Morning Show Host	Unang Hirit	Host	Won
2007	Star Awards	Best Travel Show Host	Pinoy Meets World	Host	Won
2008	Aliw Awards	Best Female Host Title	100% Pinoy	Host	Won
2010	Gawad Urian Awards	Best Supporting Actress	Kimmy Dora: Kambal sa Kiyeme	Gertrude	Nominated
2010	Aliw Awards	Best Emcee	Live Events	Host/Presenter	Won

- Most Outstanding Bicolana Award, Ibalong 1999
- Most Outstanding Alumna Award, UST 1999
- Millennium Men and Women Award, Evian 1999
- Clairol Herbal Essences Award, Miss Universe Pageant 1999
- First Runner-up, Miss Universe 1999
- Bb. Pilipinas-Universe 1999

== Filmography ==
=== Film ===
Year	Title	Role	Notes
2003	Walang Kapalit	Celine	
2006	Matakot Ka sa Karma	Vanessa	
2009	Kimmy Dora: Kambal sa Kiyeme	Gertrude	
2009	Patient X	Nurse Betty	
2010	Layang Bilanggo		
2011	Wedding Tayo, Wedding Hindi	Atty. Lilly Vargas	
2011	My House Husband: Ikaw Na!	Veron	
2012	Kimmy Dora and the Temple of Kiyeme	Gertrude	
2012	Of All the Things	Umboy's ex-girlfriend	
2013	Kimmy Dora: Ang Kiyemeng Prequel	Gertrude	

=== Television ===
Year	Title	Role	Notes
1999–2002; 2014; 2015; 2017; 2019	Unang Hirit	Herself	
2000–2003	Extra Extra	Herself	
2003	Extra Challenge	Herself	
2003	Magpakailanman: Nang Bumaba sa Lupa ang Bituin sa Langit (The Nelia Sancho Story)	Nelia Sancho	Lead role
2003–2004	All About You	Herself	
2004	Magpakailanman: Kadenang Salamin (Miriam Quiambao Story)	Herself	Lead role / Life story
2006–2007	Pinoy Meets World	Herself	
2006	Dahil Sa Iyong Paglisan	Herself	
2006–2007	Palaban	Herself	Host with Winnie Monsod and Malou Mangahas
2007–2008	100% Pinoy!	Herself	
2007–2008	The Beat	Herself	
2010	5 Star Specials: Broken Hearts Club	Felice	Episode role
2010	Showtime	Herself	Guest judge
2010	Kung Tayo'y Magkakalayo	Aludra	Supporting cast / Antagonist
2011	I Dare You	Herself	Contestant / Kapamilya Challenger
2011	Tanikala: Panata	Gory Mendoza	Lead role
2011	Bangis	Josie/Alonah	Supporting cast
2011–2012	The Jose and Wally Show Starring Vic Sotto	Maxene	Supporting cast
2012–present	The 700 Club Asia	Herself	Guest co-host (later turned regular co-host)
2014; 2015	The Ryzza Mae Show	Herself	Guest
2015; 2018	Tunay na Buhay	Herself	Life story
2015	Second Chances	Alyssa Cortez-Villacorta	Supporting cast
2015	Eat Bulaga!: Bulaga Pa More: Videoke Pa More!	Herself	Contestant / Grand Winner
2016	A1 Ko Sa 'Yo	Herself	Guest role
2017	The Lolas' Beautiful Show	Herself	Guest
2017; 2018; 2019	Magandang Buhay	Herself	Guest
2022	Family Feud	Herself	Contestant / Team Quiambao-Roberto

== Notes ==
^{note 1} Quiambao was originally Binibining Pilipinas-World, but became Binibining Pilipinas-Universe after the titleholder, Janelle Bautista, was dethroned

Awards and achievements
Preceded by (Venezuela) Veruska Ramirez	Miss Universe; 1st Runner-up; 1999	Succeeded by (Venezuela) Claudia Moreno
Preceded by Jewel Lobaton (1998); Janelle Bautista (1999; Dethroned)	Binibining Pilipinas Universe (Successor); 1999	Succeeded by Nina Ricci Alagao
