= Sheillah Molelekwa =

- Born: Sheillah Molelekwa; 7 May 1993 (age 33); Gaborone, Botswana
- Height: 1.7 m (5 ft 7 in)
- Beauty pageant titleholder
- Title: Miss Universe Botswana 2012 Big Brother Africa House Mate/TV Presenter/actress/singer/songwriter
- Hair color: Black
- Major competitions: Miss Universe Botswana / Big Brother Africa Hotshots 2014 2012 (Winner); Miss Universe 2012 (Unplaced)

Sheillah Molelekwa (born 12 May 1993) is a Botswana beauty pageant titleholder who was crowned Miss Universe Botswana 2012 and represented Botswana in the 2012 Miss Universe pageant.

== Miss Universe Botswana 2012 ==
Sheillah Molelekwa was crowned Miss Universe Botswana 2012 during the annual competition held at the Gaborone International Convention Center (GICC) on 14 October 2012, beating 11 other contestants. During the contest, she modeled a national costume with a beaded headdress and a whip, which made Time magazine's list of Most Bizarre National Costumes.

== Personal life ==
After growing up with her grandmother in a small village, she moved to Gaborone to live with her mother. She is studied accounting at Botho College in hopes of becoming an auditor.

Awards and achievements
Preceded by Larona Kgabo	Miss Universe Botswana; 2012	Succeeded by Tsaone Macheng
