= Miss Universe Botswana =

Botswanan beauty pageant

Miss Universe Botswana Organization
- Formation: 1999; 27 years ago
- Type: Beauty pageant
- Headquarters: Gaborone
- Location: Botswana
- Members: Miss Universe
- Official language: English
- CEO: Safie Sekgwa

Miss Universe Botswana is a national beauty pageant and organization that selects Botswana's official representative for Miss Universe—one of the Big Four international beauty pageants.

== History ==
=== 1999–2004 ===
The first ever Miss Universe Botswana pageant was held at the Grand Palm Hotel Casino Resort in the capital of Gaborone on the March 19, 1999. In 1999 Mpule Kwelagobe became the 3rd woman from Africa who was crowned Miss Universe pageant. Between 2002 and 2003 the country did not participate in Miss Universe but in 2004 the country sent a winning title of Miss Universe Botswana to Ecuador, Miss Universe 2004.

=== 2010–2013 ===
In 2010, Mos Syde Worldwide Entertainment Group; an international entertainment and fashion company domiciled in Gaborone, Botswana's business capital, acquired the rights for the Miss Universe Botswana pageant after Botswana had been absent from Miss Universe for six years. The aim was to revive the pageant in Botswana, bring it back for good, and help drive the global Women empowerment agenda. Safie Sekgwa is the National Director of Miss Universe Botswana.

=== 2019 ===
After rumors that Mpule Kwelagobe took over the Miss Universe Botswana franchise in 2019, Kwelagobe denied the allegations. "This is not true. I do not know who has been spreading these fake reports, but I am not the franchise holder of Miss Universe and I do not have any interest whatsoever in doing so,".

=== 2024 ===
Mos Syde Worldwide Entertainment Group retook the Miss Universe license for Botswana. Safie Sekgwa returned to be a national director of Botswana.

== Gallery of winners ==
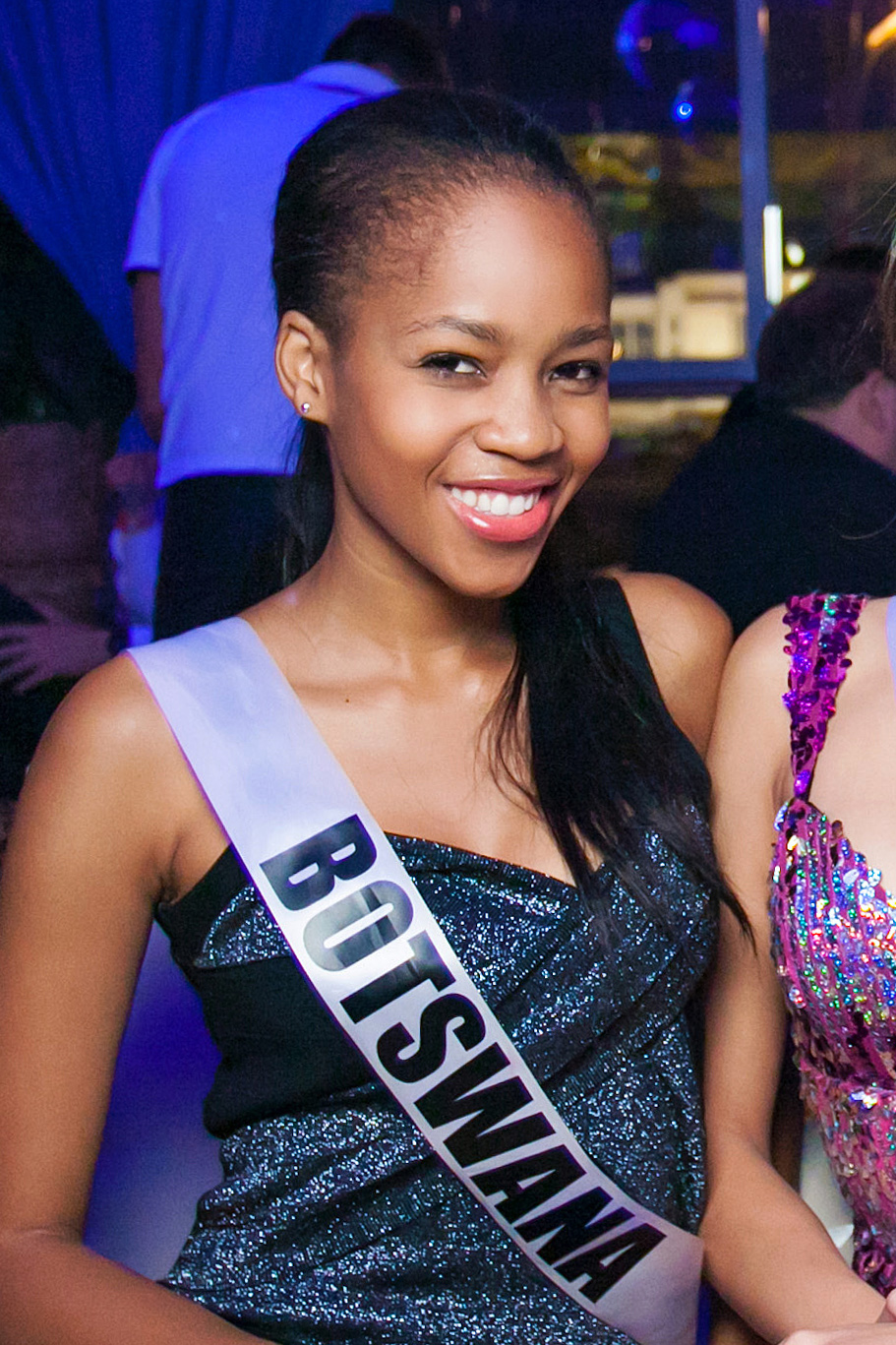
Miss Universe Botswana 2013
Tsaone Macheng

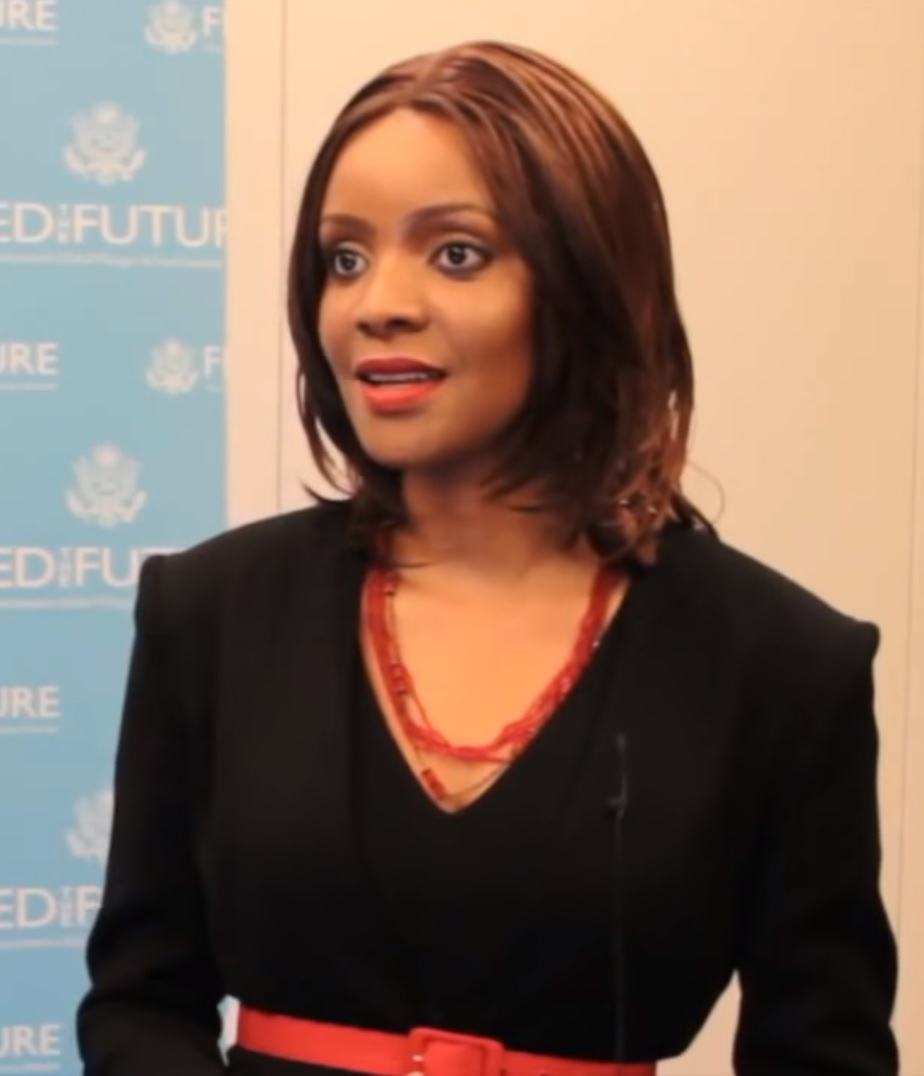
Miss Universe 1999
Mpule Kwelagobe

== Titleholders ==
Color key

- : Declared as Winner
- : Ended as runner-up
- : Ended as one of the finalists or semi-finalists
- : Ended as Special awards winner

Year	District	Miss Universe Botswana	Placement at Miss Universe	Special Award(s)	Notes
Safie Sekgwa directorship — a franchise holder to Miss Universe from 2010
2026	Gaborone	Dabilo Moses	TBA	TBA	Appointed, Dabilo was the first runner-up at Miss Universe Botswana 2025.
2025	Gaborone	Lillian Andries	Unplaced		On December 18th, 2025 Lillian Andries was stripped of her title for breaching her contract.
2024	Kweneng	Thanolo Keutlwile	Unplaced		
Did not compete between 2014—2023: Lack of sponsorship and enthusiastic license ownership meant that Botswana was absent from Miss Universe for many years.
2013	Gaborone	Tsaone Macheng	Unplaced		
2012	Gaborone	Sheillah Molelekwa	Unplaced		
2011	Gaborone	Larona Motlatsi Kgabo	Unplaced		
2010	Gaborone	Tirelo Ramasedi	Unplaced		
Miss Universe Botswana – Announced by Mr Phiri, High Commissioner of Zambia to Botswana
Did not compete between 2005—2009: Lack of sponsorship and enthusiastic license ownership meant that Botswana was absent from Miss Universe for many years.
2004	Gaborone	Icho Keolotswe	Unplaced		
Did not compete between 2002—2003
2001	Gaborone	Mataila Sikwane	Unplaced		
2000	Orapa	Joyce Molemoeng	Unplaced		
1999	South-East	Mpule Kwelagobe	Miss Universe 1999		Before winning Miss Universe 1999, Mpule experienced at Miss World 1997, but she did not make the semi-finalist.

=== Wins by district ===
District	Titles	Years
Gaborone	7	2001, 2004, 2010, 2011, 2012, 2013, 2025
Kweneng	1	2024
Orapa	1	2000
South-East	1	1999

== See also ==
- Miss Universe
