= Andrea Aguilera (Ecuadorian model) =

Ecuadorian beauty pageant titleholder

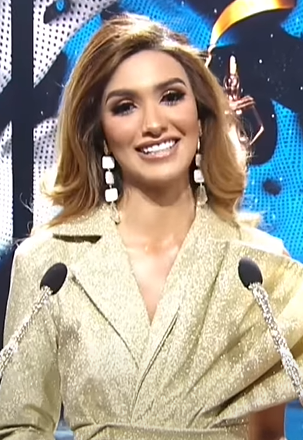
- Aguilera in 2021
- Born: Andrea Victoria Aguilera Paredes; Ventanas, Ecuador
- Education: UEES
- Height: 1.80 m (5 ft 11 in)
- Beauty pageant titleholder
- Title: Miss Grand Ecuador 2021; Miss Ecuador Supranational 2023; Miss Supranational 2023
- Hair color: Brown
- Eye color: Black
- Major competitions: Miss Earth Ecuador 2019; (Miss Earth–Fire); Miss Grand Ecuador 2021; (Winner); Miss Grand International 2021; (1st Runner-Up); Miss Supranational 2023; (Winner)

Andrea Victoria Aguilera Paredes is an Ecuadorian beauty pageant titleholder who won Miss Supranational 2023 on July 14, 2023. She is the first Ecuadorian to have won Miss Supranational.

She had previously won Miss Grand Ecuador 2021, and represented Ecuador at Miss Grand International 2021 and was the first runner-up.

== Early life and education ==
Aguilera was born in Ventanas, Ecuador. Aguilera represented her province at several pageants in her country. She was studying medicine at the University of Guayaquil in 2021, but paused to compete for Miss Grand International 2021. After the pageant, Aguilera joined the sixth season of the reality show Soy el Mejor 2022, but left after two episodes, after three judges made derogatory remarks about her participation at Miss Grand International. In 2022, Aguilera resumed her studies, pursuing a bachelor's degree in International Business at the UEES.

== Pageantry ==
=== Reina de Los Rios 2019 ===
Aguilera's first pageant was the provincial pageant, Reina de Los Rios, which she won on September 27, 2019.

=== Miss Grand Ecuador 2021 ===
On June 26, 2021, she represented Los Rios and won Miss Grand Ecuador 2021 on TC Televisión in Guayaquil, Ecuador, against five other candidates.

=== Miss Grand International 2021 ===
Aguilera represented Ecuador at Miss Grand International 2021 on December 4, and finished as the first runner-up.

=== Miss Supranational 2023 ===
In March 2023, Aguilera won Miss Ecuador Supranational 2023. She then represented Ecuador and won Miss Supranational 2023 in Nowy Sącz, Poland. Aguilera is the first Ecuadorian and second South American woman to win in the history of the Miss Supranational competition since Stephanía Stegman of Paraguay in 2015.

Awards and achievements
Preceded by Lalela Mswane	Miss Supranational; 2023	Succeeded by Harashta Haifa Zahra
Preceded by Valery Carabalí	Miss Ecuador Supranational; 2023	Succeeded by Doménica Alessi
Preceded by Samantha Bernardo	Miss Grand International 1st Runner-Up; 2021	Succeeded by Engfa Waraha
Preceded by Sonia Luna	Miss Grand Ecuador; 2021	Succeeded by Lisseth Naranjo
Preceded by Paulette Sanchez	Miss Earth Ecuador – Fire; 2019	Succeeded by None
