= Miss Grand Ecuador 2021 =

1st Miss Grand Ecuador competition, beauty pageant edition

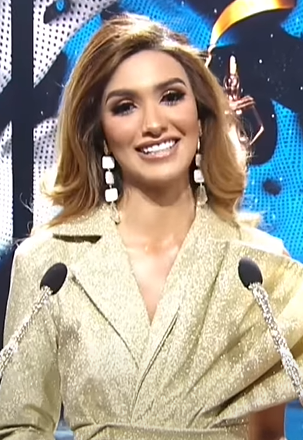
- Andrea Aguilera, the winner of the contest
- Date: 26 June 2021
- Presenters: Ronald Farina; Miguel Cedeño
- Venue: TC Televisión Studios, Guayaquil
- Broadcaster: TC Televisión; YouTube
- Entrants: 6
- Placements: 3
- Debuts: Cañar; El Oro; Esmeraldas; Los Ríos; Manabí; Pichincha
- Winner: Andrea Aguilera Paredes; Los Ríos

External videos
- Miss Grand Ecuador 2021 Grand Final Competition, on 27 June 2022, YouTube video

Miss Grand Ecuador 2021 was the inaugural edition of the Miss Grand Ecuador beauty pageant, held on 26 June 2021, at the TC Televisión Studios in Guayaquil. Six contestants, qualified for the national stage through an online audition, competed for the title, of whom the a 20-year old medical student and model from Los Ríos, Andrea Aguilera, was elected the winner. The contest was showcased under the direction of Tahiz Panus and Miguel Panus, presidents of the Concurso Nacional de Belleza Ecuador (CNB Ecuador), who have owned the Miss Grand Ecuador license since 2019.

The event was broadcast nationwide via TC Televisión as well as on Miss Grand International's YouTube channel, GrandTV, for a global audience. Clara Sosa, Miss Grand International 2018 from Paraguay, attended the event and served as the public speaking trainer for the delegates during the pageant camp held a few days before the gala final, which was hosted by Ronald Farina and Miguel Cedeño. The media expected the current international titleholder, American Abena Appiah, to attend, but the airline was unable to arrive for unknown reasons, according to the organization's publicist.

Andrea temporarily quit her undergraduate studies after winning the competition to compete in the Miss Grand International 2021 pageant in Thailand, where she was named the vice-queen of the Vietnamese candidate, Nguyễn Thúc Thùy Tiên. Furthermore, the contest's first runner-up, Emilia Vásquez of Pichincha Province, was later assignated Miss Grand Ecuador 2022 and was expected to represent the country at the 2022 international contest in Indonesia, but she was replaced by Liseth Naranjo for undisclosed reasons.

== Competition ==
In the grand final competition held on June 26, the results of the early round—which consisted of the swimsuit and evening gown competitions and the speech round, wherein all six qualified candidates delivered a speech related to the pageant campaign, Stop wars and violence—determined the 3 semifinalists, who then competed in the question and answer portion. After which, Miss Grand Ecuador 2021 and her two runners-up were announced.

The summary of the selection process is shown below.

Miss Grand Ecuador 2021 selection process

Initial pool (6 candidates)			Finals (Top 3)		Winner
Cañar; El Oro; Esmeraldas; Los Ríos; Manabí; Pichincha	Swimsuit round	Evening gown & speech round	Los Ríos; Manabí; Pichincha	Question & answer round	Los Ríos

== Result ==
Miss Grand Ecuador 2021 competition result by province
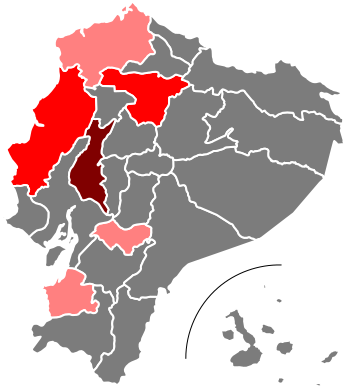
Color keys

Winner
Runners-up

Unplaced
Did not compete

Position	Delegate
Miss Grand Ecuador 2021	Los Ríos – Andrea Aguilera
1st Runner-up	Pichincha – Emilia Vásquez (Resigned)
2nd Runner-up	Manabí – Marjorie Vivas
Special awards
Best in Swimsuit	El Oro – Tahiz Zambrano
Miss Cielo	Los Ríos – Andrea Aguilera
Miss Multimedia	Los Ríos – Andrea Aguilera

== Contestants ==
6 contestants competed for the title of Miss Grand Ecuador 2021.

Province	Delegate	Age	Height	Hometown
Cañar	Dayanna Méndez	24	1.70 m (5 ft 7 in)	La Troncal
El Oro	Tahiz Zambrano	20	1.80 m (5 ft 11 in)	Machala
Esmeraldas	Lissette Arroyo	26	1.70 m (5 ft 7 in)	Esmeraldas
Los Ríos	Andrea Aguilera	20	1.80 m (5 ft 11 in)	Ventanas
Manabí	Marjorie Vivas	27	1.75 m (5 ft 9 in)	Portoviejo
Pichincha	Emilia Vásquez	25	1.73 m (5 ft 8 in)	Quito
