= Miss Earth Ecuador 2019 =

Ecuadorian beauty pageant

- Date: August 10, 2019
- Venue: Teatro Sánchez Aguilar, Samborondón, Guayas
- Broadcaster: Telerama
- Entrants: 9
- Placements: 6
- Debuts: Loja; Los Ríos
- Withdrawals: El Oro; Guayas; Orellana
- Winner: Antonella Paz; Esmeraldas
- Congeniality: Karen Sonorza; Santo Domingo
- Best National Costume: Antonella Paz; Esmeraldas
- Photogenic: Antonella Paz; Esmeraldas

Miss Earth Ecuador 2019 was the 3rd edition of Miss Earth Ecuador pageant. The election night was held August 10, 2019 in Samborondón where Diana Valdivieso from Manabí crowned Antonella Paz from Esmeraldas. The winner represented Ecuador at Miss Earth 2019 pageant.

== Results ==
=== Placements ===
Placement	Contestant
Miss Earth Ecuador 2019	Esmeraldas – Antonella Paz
Miss Air Ecuador 2019	Manabí – Génesis Loor
Miss Water Ecuador 2019	Tungurahua – Daniela Bermeo
Miss Fire Ecuador 2019	Los Ríos – Andrea Aguilera
Top 6	Chimborazo – Raizza Anilema; Santo Domingo – Karen Sornoza

=== Special awards ===
Award	Contestant
Miss Congeniality	Santo Domingo – Karen Sornoza
Miss Photogenic	Esmeraldas – Antonella Paz
Miss Popularity	Manabí – Génesis Loor
Best Face	Tungurahua – Daniela Bermeo
Best Catwalk	Esmeraldas – Antonella Paz
Best Skin	Manabí – Génesis Loor
Best Smile	Esmeraldas – Antonella Paz
Best National Costume	Esmeraldas – Antonella Paz

== Contestants ==
Nine contestants competed for the title.

Province	Contestant	Age	Height	Hometown
Azuay	Natalia Córdova	18	1.72 m (5 ft 7 1/2 in)	Cuenca
Chimborazo	Raizza Yanira Anilema Medina	22	1.66 m (5 ft 5 1/2 in)	Riobamba
Esmeraldas	Karla Antonella Paz Marín	18	1.76 m (5 ft 9 1/2 in)	Esmeraldas
Loja	Ariana Herrera	20	1.70 m (5 ft 7 in)	Loja
Los Ríos	Andrea Victoria Aguilera Paredes	18	1.80 m (5 ft 11 in)	Ventanas
Manabí	Lisbeth Yamileth Peñafiel Castro	21	1.70 m (5 ft 7 in)	Manta
Manabí	Génesis Jacqueline Loor Delgado	19	1.70 m (5 ft 7 in)	Portoviejo
Santo Domingo	Karen Analy Sornoza Artega	19	1.70 m (5 ft 7 in)	Santo Domingo
Tungurahua	Daniela Bermeo Díaz	20	1.74 m (5 ft 8 1/2 in)	Ambato

== Notes ==
=== Debuts ===
- Loja
- Los Ríos

=== Returns ===
- Esmeraldas

=== Withdrawals ===
- El Oro
- Guayas
- Esmeraldas

=== Did not compete ===
- El Oro - Leydi Stefanía Nazareno Vélez

== Crossovers ==
- Andrea Aguilera won Reina de Ventanas 2018.

Miss Grand International

- 2021: Andrea Aguilera (1st RU)

Miss Supranational

- 2023: Andrea Aguilera (Winner)
