= Edwin Villafuerte =

Ecuadorian footballer (born 1979)

Personal information
- Full name: Edwin Alberto Villafuerte Posligua
- Date of birth: March 12, 1979 (age 47)
- Place of birth: Ventanas, Los Ríos Province, Ecuador
- Position: Goalkeeper

Senior career*
Years	Team	Apps	(Gls)
1997–2007	Barcelona	93	(0)
2006	→ Deportivo Quito (loan)	17	(0)
2008	Olmedo	0	(0)
2009	Técnico Universitario	17	(0)
2010	ESPOLI	5	(0)
2011	Huaquillas Fútbol Club	0	(0)
2011	Atlético Audaz	5	(0)
2012	Deportivo Pereira		
2013	Deportivo Quevedo		

International career^{‡}
2004–2007	Ecuador	16	(0)
- * Club domestic league appearances and goals as of December 6, 2008 ‡ National team caps and goals as of December 6, 2008

Edwin Alberto Villafuerte Posligua (born 12 March 1979) is an Ecuadorian former goalkeeper who last played for Club Deportivo Quevedo.

== Club career ==
Once dubbed ‘Ecuador’s New Hands’, goalkeeper Villafuerte found it difficult to sustain a first team spot at Barcelona SC behind Jose Cevallos. In order to get more regular football, he moved to Deportivo Quito in January 2006.

== International career ==
As a youngster, he was included in Ecuador's squad for the 1995 FIFA U-17 World Championship. In that tournament he kept clean sheets against the United States and Japan.

With Villafuerte in goal, Ecuador beat Brazil and Argentina at home in their 2006 FIFA World Cup qualifying campaign, keeping clean sheets on both occasions.

He has 15 international caps as of June 15, 2006. Since the 2006 FIFA World Cup, it appeared coach Luis Fernando Suarez had completely discarded Villafuerte. However, he was called up for the 2010 World Cup qualifiers against Paraguay and Peru, the latter of which he made an appearance against.
