= Chimbo Canton =

- Canton
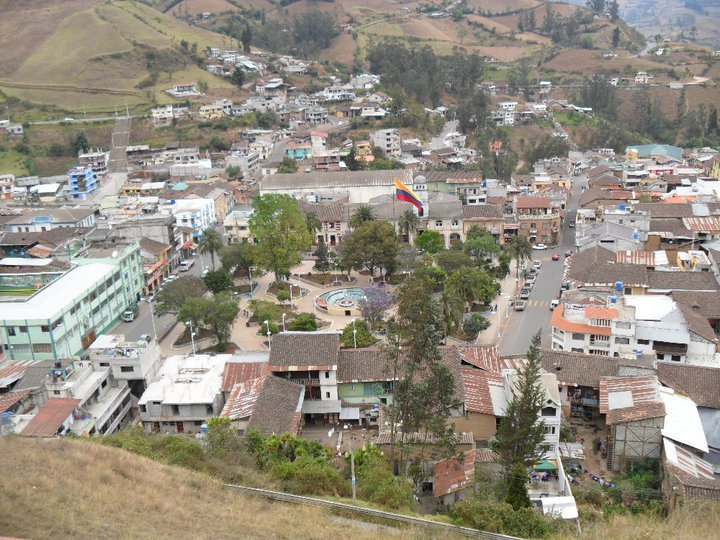
- Chimbo

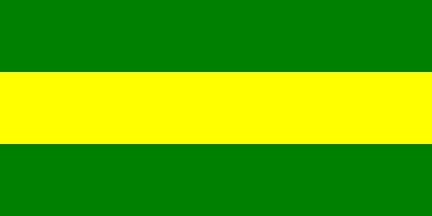
- Flag

- Location of Bolívar Province in Ecuador.

- Chimbo Canton in Bolívar Province
- Coordinates: 01°42′0″S 79°01′0″W
- Country: Ecuador
- Province: Bolívar Province
- Capital: Chimbo

Area
  - Total: 269.8 km^{2} (104.2 sq mi)

Population (2022 census)
  - Total: 15,524
  - Density: 57.54/km^{2} (149.0/sq mi)
- Time zone: UTC-5 (ECT)

Chimbo Canton is a canton of Ecuador, located in the Bolívar Province. Its capital is the town of Chimbo. Its population at the 2001 census was 15,005.

== Demographics ==
Ethnic groups as of the Ecuadorian census of 2010:

- Mestizo 92.1%
- Indigenous 3.5%
- White 3.1%
- Afro-Ecuadorian 1.0%
- Montubio 0.4%
- Other 0.1%
