= Humberto Pizarro =

Ecuadorian footballer and manager (born 1967)

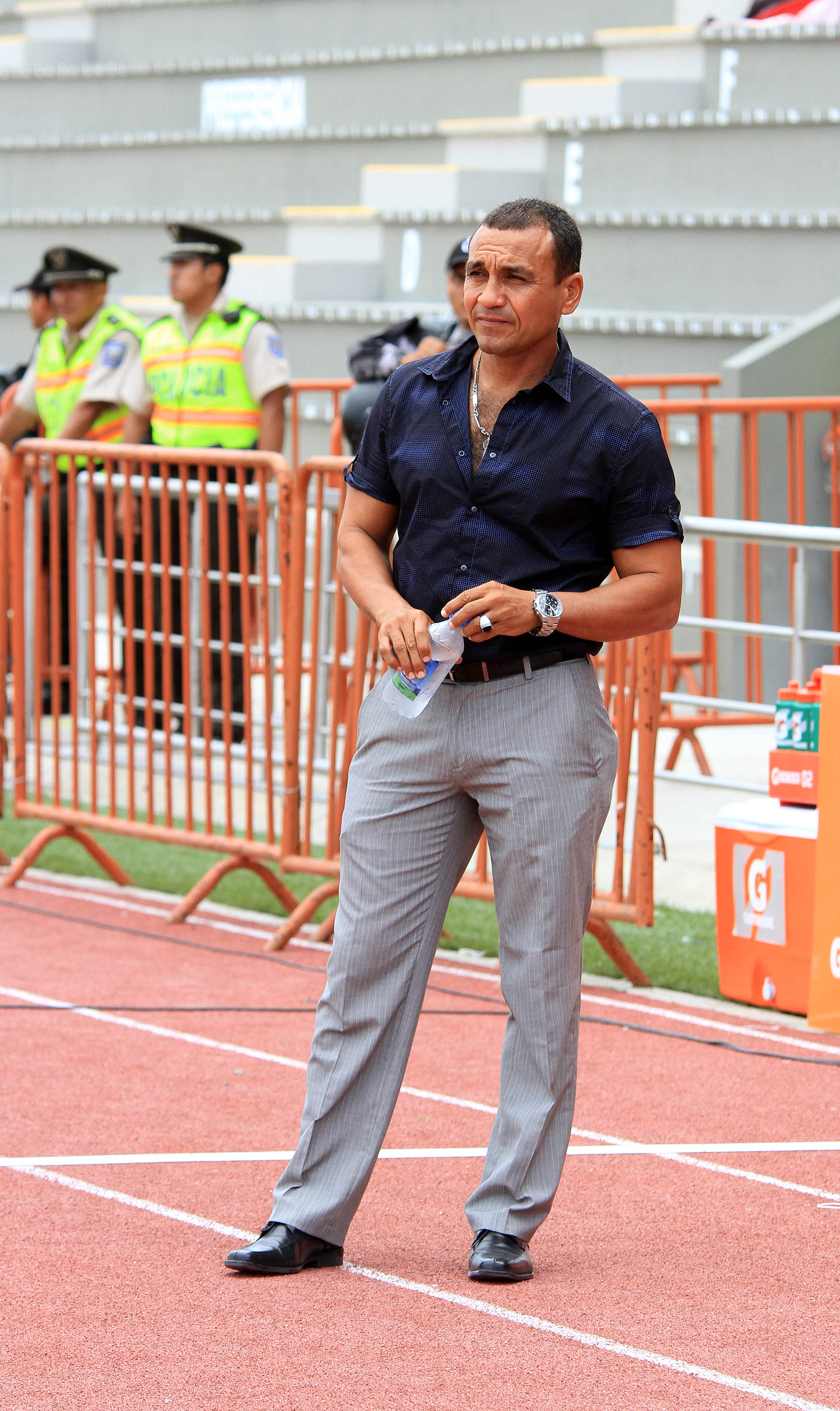
- Pizarro with River Ecuador in 2015

Personal information
- Full name: Humberto Enrique Pizarro Veliz
- Date of birth: 28 July 1967 (age 59)
- Place of birth: Ventanas, Ecuador

Managerial career
- Years: Team
- Emelec (youth)
- 2007: Emelec (interim)
- 2008: Emelec (interim)
- 2010–2011: Rocafuerte
- 2012–2015: River Ecuador
- 2016: Mushuc Runa
- 2016: Colón FC
- 2018: La Paz
- 2019–2020: Orense
- 2021: Chacaritas
- 2021: Olmedo
- 2022: LDU Portoviejo

Humberto Enrique Pizarro Veliz (born 28 July 1967) is an Ecuadorian football manager.

== Career ==
Born in Ventanas, Pizarro worked as a coach at Emelec's youth setup, being also an interim manager of the first team in 2007 and 2008. In February 2010, he was named manager of Serie B side Rocafuerte.

In March 2012, Pizarro took over fellow second division side River Ecuador, and achieved promotion to the Serie A in 2014. On 16 December 2015, he was appointed at the helm of Mushuc Runa also in the top tier, but left the post the following 11 April.

In August 2016, Pizarro returned to thee second level after being named manager of Colón FC, but left in November. In 2018, after a year without a club, he took over Segunda Categoría side La Paz, but left in September of that year after failing to achieve promotion.

For the 2019 campaign, Pizarro was named at the helm of Orense in the second division, and achieved top tier promotion in his first season, as champions. He was dismissed by the club on 2 September 2020 due to poor results, and was named sporting manager of 9 de Octubre on 9 December.

On 31 May 2021, Pizarro was appointed manager of Chacaritas in the second division. He resigned on 26 July, and was announced manager of Olmedo on 30 July; five days later, however, he gave up coaching the club after a meeting with the board.
