= Ventanas Canton =

- Canton
- Flag

- Location of Los Rios Province in Ecuador.

- Location of Ventanas Canton in Los Ríos Province
- Coordinates: 1°27′0″S 79°28′12″W
- Country: Ecuador
- Province: Los Ríos Province
- Capital: Ventanas
- Established: 10 November 1952

Government
  - Mayor: Rafael Sánchez Ochoa

Area
  - Total: 512.8 km^{2} (198.0 sq mi)

Population (2022 census)
  - Total: 73,211
  - Density: 142.8/km^{2} (369.8/sq mi)
- Time zone: UTC-5 (ECT)
- Website: https://ventanas.gob.ec

Ventanas Canton is a canton of Ecuador, located in the Los Ríos Province. Its capital is the town of Ventanas. Its population at the 2001 census was 71,145.

== Governance ==
The Ventanas canton, like the other Ecuadorian cantons, is governed by a municipal government as stipulated in the National Political Constitution. The Municipal Government of Ventanas is a sectional government entity that administers the canton autonomously from the central government.

== Populations figures ==
According to INEC projections for 2022, the canton has a population of 76,104 inhabitants, making it the fourth most populous canton at the provincial level. Ethnic groups as of the Ecuadorian census of 2010: Ethnic groups as of the Ecuadorian census of 2010:

- Mestizo 55.5%
- Montubio 33.8%
- Afro-Ecuadorian 5.8%
- White 3.7%
- Indigenous 1.0%
- Other 0.3%

== Political divisions ==
The canton is divided into 5 parishes (Spanish: parroquias), classified as either urban or rural. The canton has more parishes than any other canton in Ecuador. The urban parishes make up the city of Ventanas.

Rural parishes

- Chacarita
- Los Ángeles
- Zapotal

Urban parishes

- 10 de Noviembre
- Ventanas
