= Ventanas =

- City
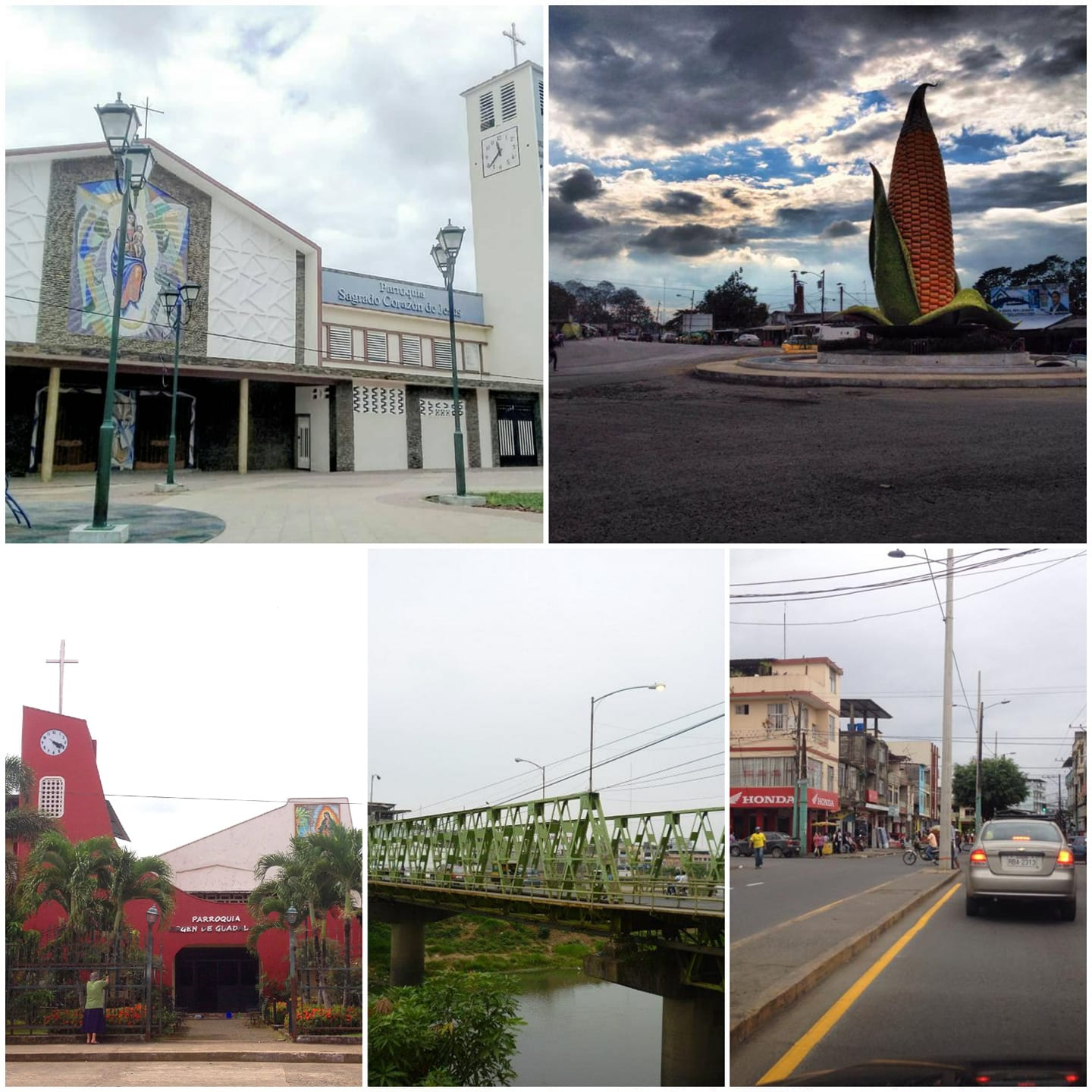

- Flag
- Nickname: Capital of Corn belt in Ecuador (Capital Maicera del Ecuador)
- Location within Ecuador
- Coordinates: 1°27′0″S 79°28′12″W
- Country: Ecuador
- Province: Los Ríos
- Canton: Ventanas Canton
- Founded: 10 November 1952
- Urban parishes: 2 urban parishes

Government
  - Mayor: Carlos Carriel

Area
  - City: 4.8 km^{2} (1.9 sq mi)
- Elevation: 24 m (79 ft)

Population (2022 census)
  - City: 41,531
  - Density: 8,700/km^{2} (22,000/sq mi)
- Demonym: ventaneño(a)
- Time zone: UTC-5 (ECT)
- Postal code: EC120750
- Area code: (0)5
- Languages: Spanish
- Climate: Aw
- Website: www.ventanas.gob.ec

Ventanas is an Ecuadorian city; head of the Ventanas Canton, in the Los Ríos Province, as well as the fourth most populated city in the Province of Los Ríos. It is located in the center of the coastal region of Ecuador, on an extensive plain, crossed by the Zapotal River, at an altitude of 24 meters above sea level and with a rainy tropical climate of 26 °C on average. It is called "The Corn Capital of Ecuador" for its important production of corn. At the 2022 census it had a population of 41,531, making it the thirty-eighth most populous city in the country. It is part of the metropolitan area of Babahoyo, since its economic, social and commercial activity is strongly linked to Babahoyo, being a "dormitory city" for thousands of workers who travel to that city by land daily. The conglomerate is home to more than 250,000 inhabitants.

Its origins date from the end of the colonial era. Since the middle of the 19th century, the city has presented a moderate, but constant demographic growth, due to its agricultural production, until establishing an urban town, which would later be one of the main urban centers of the province. It is one of the most important administrative, economic, financial and commercial centers of Los Ríos. The main activities of the city are trade, agriculture and livestock.

== Place names ==
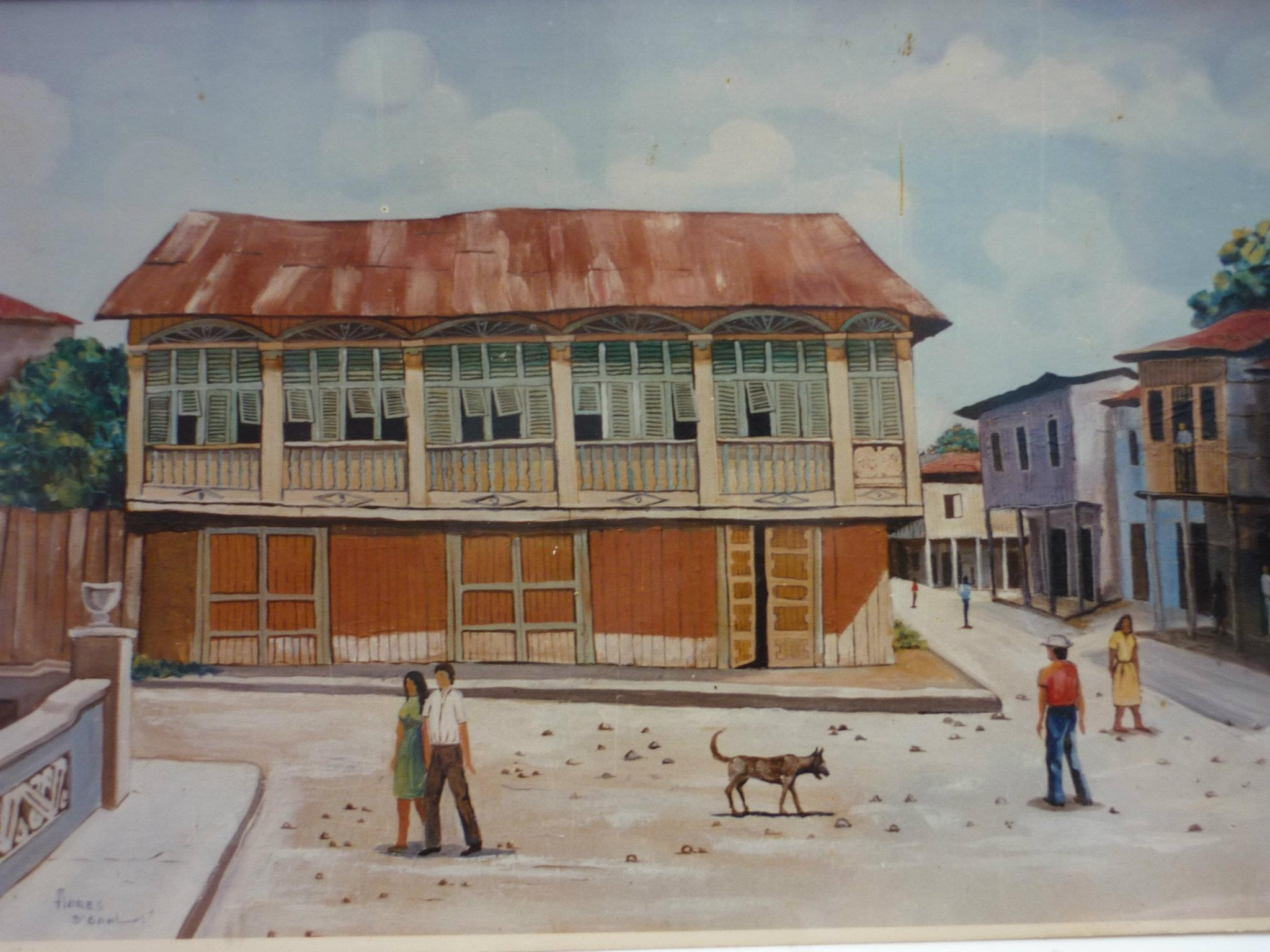
The House of Windows

There are 2 versions:

- The first says that it was located a short distance from the first foothills of the mountain range, which is why it was one of the populated places where travelers from the mountains arrived to leave their products on the coast, literally opening the windows of commerce to travelers.
- The second version says that the name Ventanas originated because a man named Martínez had a store in his colonial-type house with many windows, where the dors went to stock up on what they needed and always said "let's go to the house of the windows". Over time a human settlement was formed that grew thanks to travelers, merchants who came down to barter and do business with their products from the mountains and exchange them for products from the coast. According to the residents, this is how a town they called Ventanas developed.

== History ==
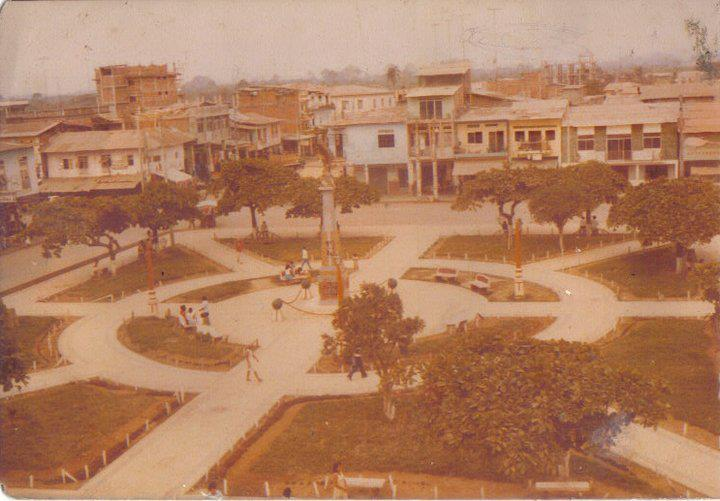
Old Central Square of Ventanas

The existence of Ventanas goes back to the colonial period. Apparently, at the beginning of a certain stage in the parish life of Ventanas, these lands had been denounced as waste lands by a lady named Martínez, for which they were sent to evaluate and then delivered the results to Mr. Joaquín Viteri, who promised to distribute them among the neighbors who lived there, but he did not comply, since some time later he claimed to be the owner of said lands. Time passes and that hamlet that began to be known by the name of Ventanas became a Parish of the Puebloviejo canton, with a floating population in its surroundings of about 6,000 inhabitants, of which about 2,000 lived in the parish capital.

Since 1846 it was a rural parish of the Puebloviejo canton, which at that time belonged to the province of Guayas. Subsequently, when the province of Los Ríos was created by decree of 6 October 1860, issued by Dr. Gabriel García Moreno, along with Chimbo and Guaranda, it became part of that new jurisdiction. Then from there the emancipatory idea arose on the part of the then councilor of the Municipality of Puebloviejo, Mr. Gilberto Gordillo Ruiz and the support of the also councilor Mr. Rafael Astudillo Cárdenas, both representatives of the Ventanas parish; They organized an Assembly that took place in a movie theater that operated in the basement of the house of Don Nicanor Florencia Machado, which was attended by many citizens before whom Councilor Gordillo explained the reasons, and the right that attended Ventanas to become a canton

Ventanas was officially cantonized on 10 November 1952.

== Demography ==
Its population is 41,824 inhabitants in the urban area (2018), it is the fourth most populous city in the province of Los Ríos and the thirty-sixth most populous city in Ecuador.

=== Population ===
According to data from the INEC 2010 census, Ventanas had a total population of 38,168 inhabitants, of which 19,032 were men and 19,136 were women.

== Geography ==
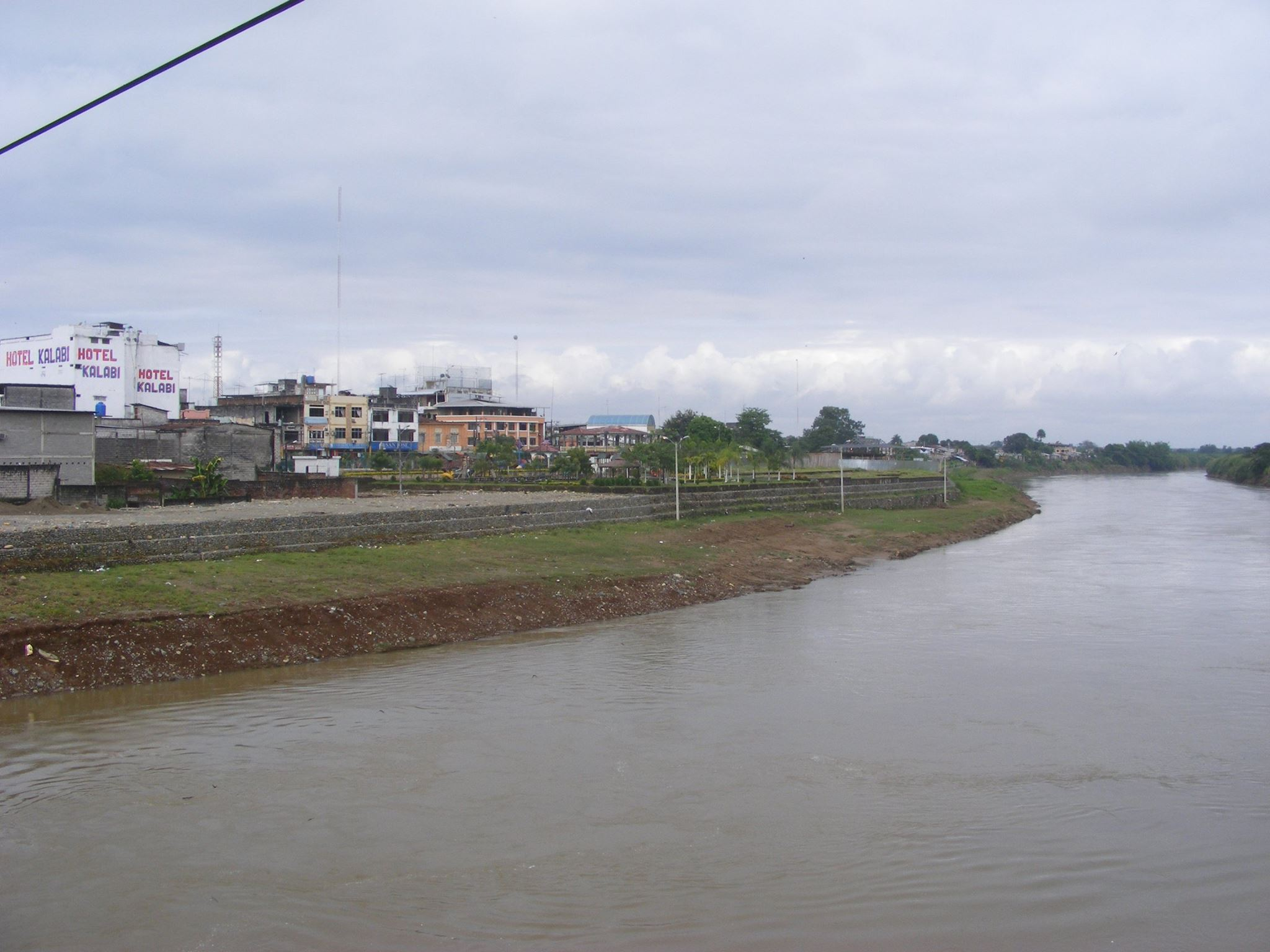
The Zapotal river, as it passes through Ventanas.

=== Location ===
It is located on an extensive plain that extends to the west, while in the east are the western flanks of the Andes mountain range. The Zapotal River crosses the city from east to west. The coordinates of the city are 1°27'S 79°28′W and its height above sea level is 25 m.

The geology of the area is related to that of the Western Cordillera located to the east, it presents reliefs of erosive tectonic origin made up of volcanic deposits and sediments from the upper Cretaceous of the Macuchi Formation, and instructed by diorite-type rock bodies. While further to the west of the canton, there are surfaces of the Pichilingue formation made up of sand, silt and clay, whose origin is depositional, erosive or cumulative.

=== Hydrography ===
The main river in Ventanas is the Zapotal, which is also reached by the waters of the Lechugal, Oncebí, Sibimbe, and Macagua rivers, among others. Finally it takes the name of Ventanas, when passing through said population, disappearing later with the name of Caracol.

=== Climate ===
The climatic classification according to Charles Warren Thornthwaite is Tropical semi-humid megathermal. The bioclimatic classification according to the Holdridge life zone system is Dry tropical forest (bts).

With respect to climate, in the Ventanas area two well-defined climatic seasons have been identified. The dry summer, generally cool, occurs from June to December; and winter, which is rainy and hot, runs from December to early June. The temperature reaches its maximum limit of 31 °C in summer 34 °C in winter; the minimum limit fluctuates between 17 °C in summer and 20 °C in winter. The average temperature is 26.3 °C.

The average annual precipitation reaches 2,120 mm.rain.

== Topographical zones ==
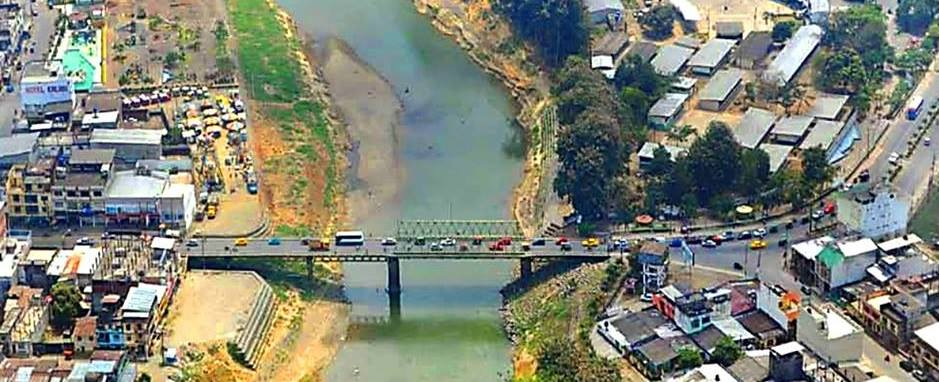
The Zapotal River divides the city into two zones

Ventanas is divided into three areas, separated by the river:

Central: is the commercial area.

South: it is mainly a residential and marginal urban area.

North: houses the residential-suburban zone, the industrial zone and the residential zone.

== Transportation ==
=== Public transportation ===
The conventional transport network of Ventanas is made up of 5 public transport lines operated by urban buses, which according to the ordinances of the mayor's office cannot have more than 10 years of service. These current lines and fleets are in the process of restructuring, as the transportation network advances.

== Points of interest ==
=== Malecón ===
It is considered one of the main tourist attractions within the city, it is located next to the Zapotal River. This recreation park has a track for skateboard and skate games. In addition, there is an area with synthetic grass and children's games, as well as a space for dance therapy. It also has gerontological games.

=== Zapotal river beach ===
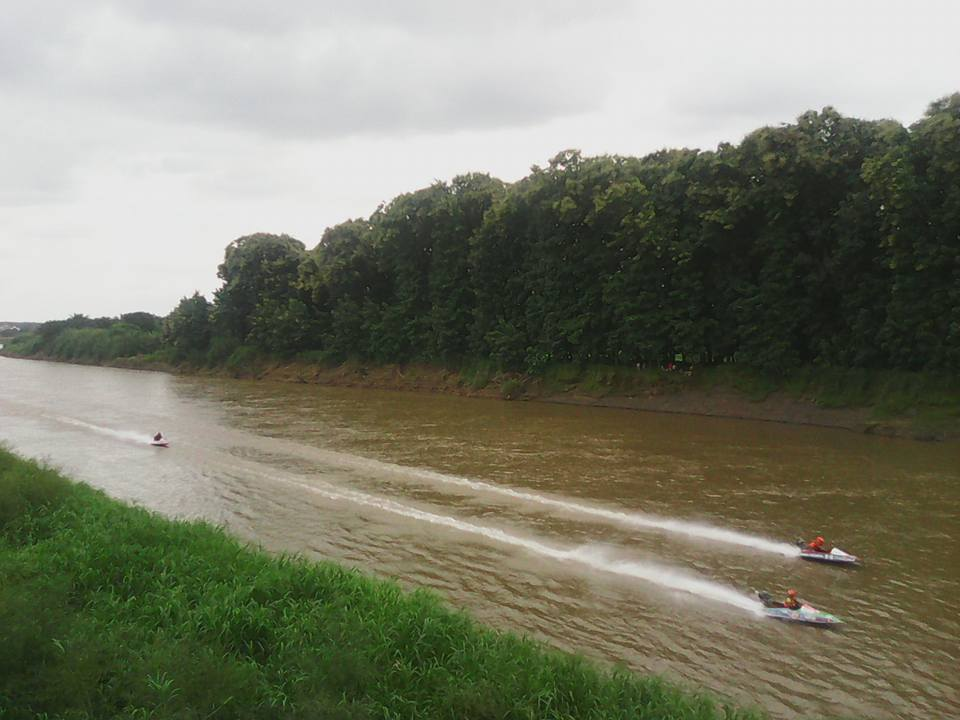
Regattas in the Zapotal river

The river is located in the center of the city, in summer it is very popular with citizens to bathe here, since at this time a small beach of sand and stones is formed which allows the people access and have a space to rest and enjoy the river. It is also visited by housewives who go to the river to wash their clothes, as was the custom in previous decades.

=== Corn Monument ===
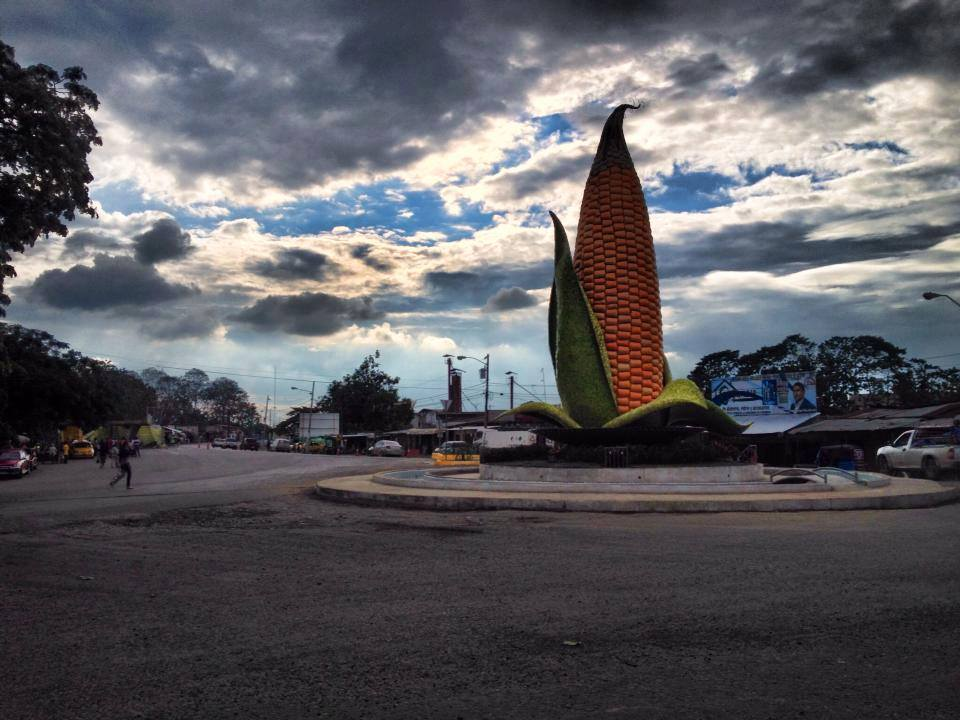
Corn Monument

Ventanas lives up to its nickname of 'Maize Capital of Ecuador', with a monument erected at the entrance to the city, in the La Y sector. The reinforced concrete structure welcomes tourists and recalls the attachment of the inhabitants to the grass

=== Parks ===
==== Central Park ====
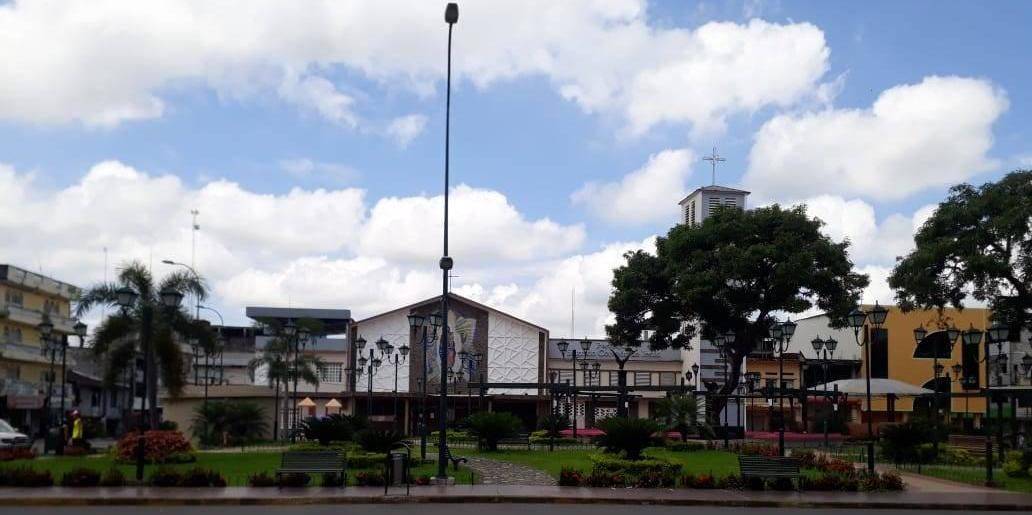
Central Park of Ventanas

Has 12,000 square meters and its boundaries are the church of the Sacred Heart of Jesus. Children's games, an athletic track and a pond with fish are the attractions of the park.

==== 13 de Abril Park ====
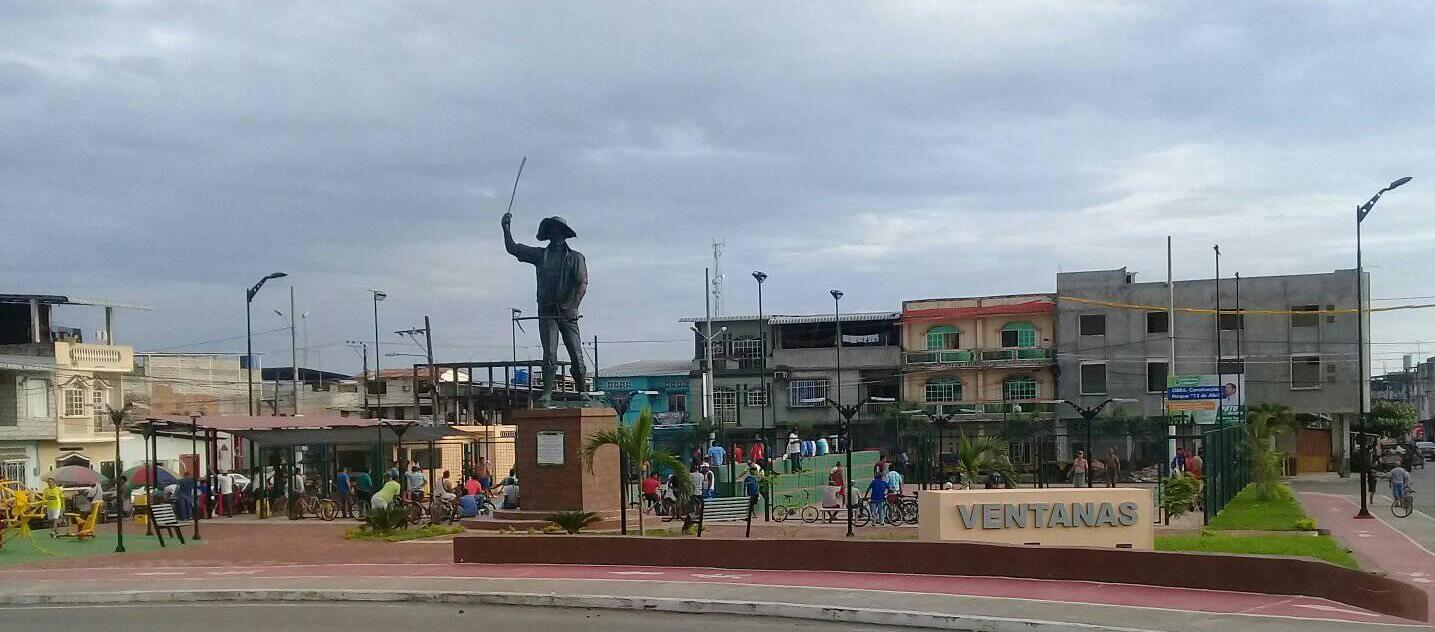
13 de Abril Park

The park has volleyball and basketball courts with their respective stands and covers, a square, a walking track, dining areas and sanitary batteries, gerontological games, and the entire enclosure to protect the safety of athletes.

==== Linear Park ====
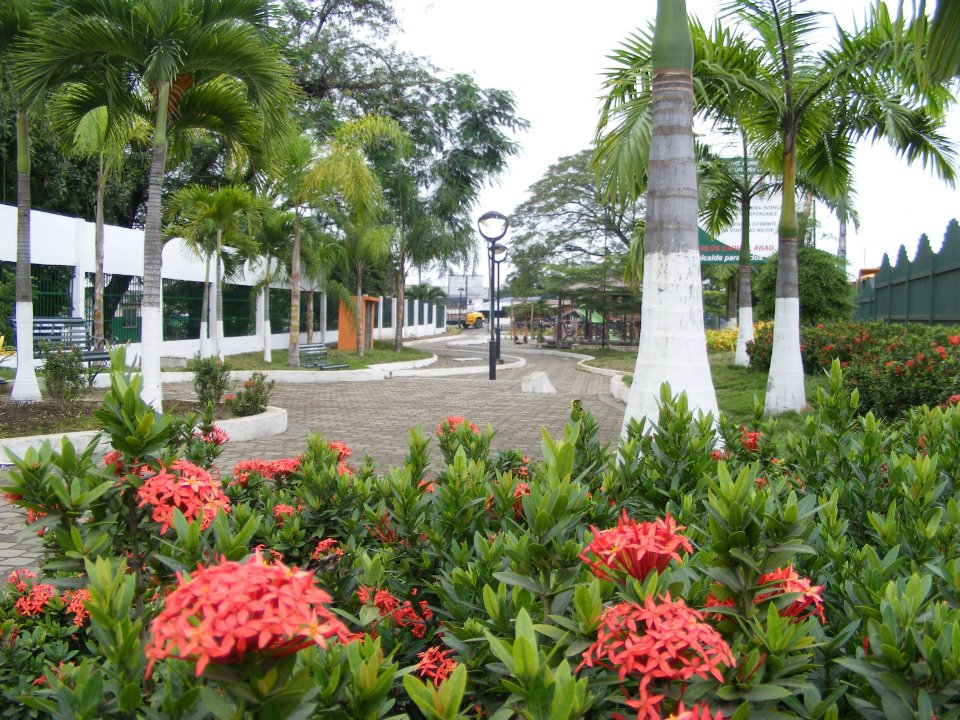
Linear Park

Has an area of 6 thousand square meters, green areas, children's games and family recreation. It also has paths, roundabouts, pools, waterfalls, colored lighting and metal seats.

=== Outside the city ===
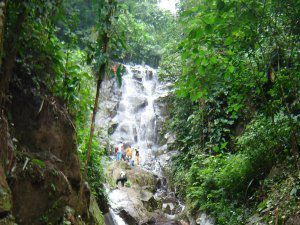
San Jacinto Waterfalls

In the San Jacinto hamlet, after a 45-minute walk, you will reach the San Jacinto waterfalls. In the area there are birds such as hummingbirds, woodpeckers, squirrels, rabbits, iguanas, fish, such as bocachico, dama, barbudo and vieja.

=== Culture ===
Some of its most popular festivities and festivals are: Last Sunday of June: Festivities of the Sacred Heart.

== Economy ==
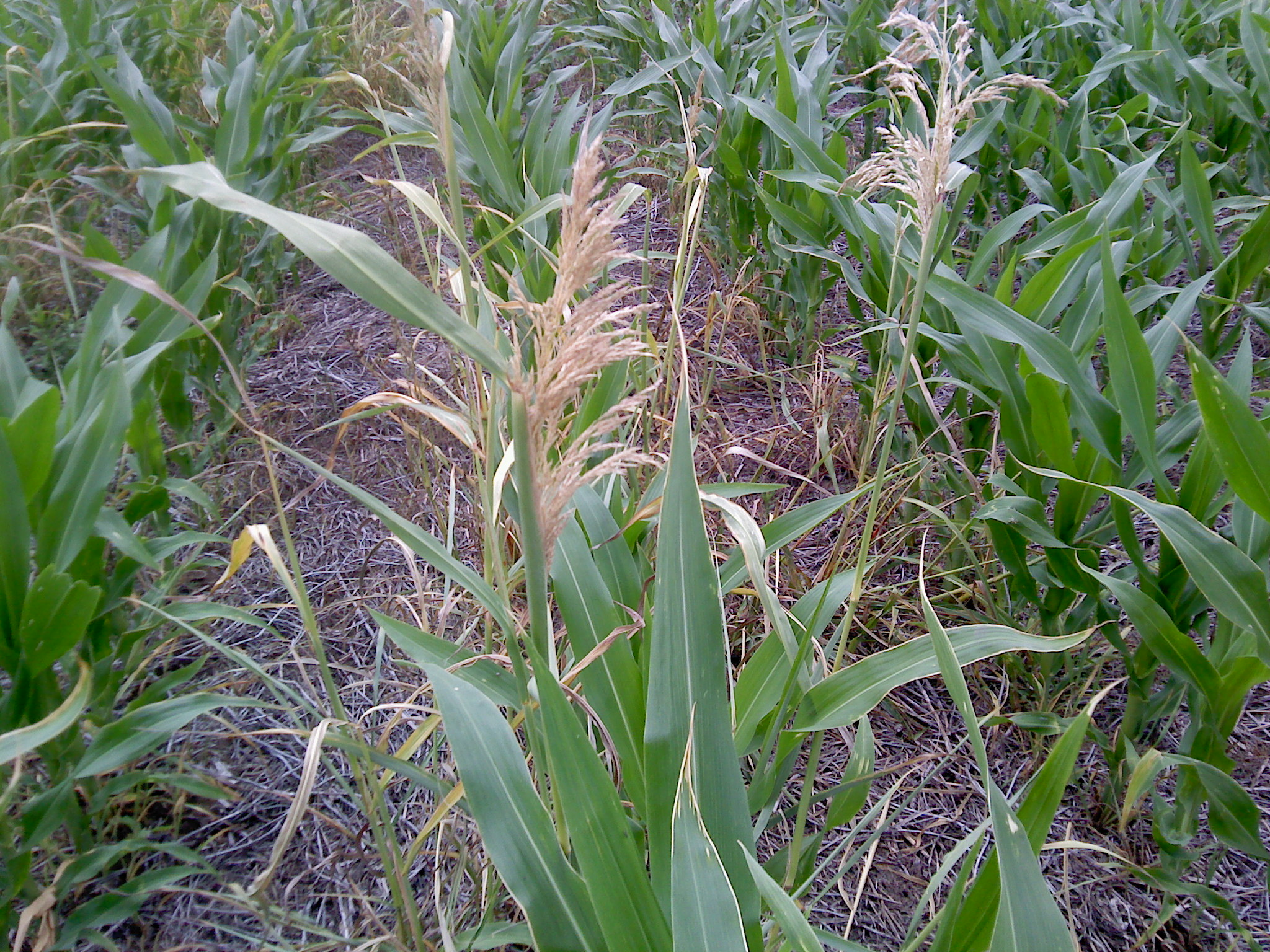
Corn crop

The average relative humidity of the air is 81% and cloudiness is high throughout the year. An eminently agricultural city, its main product being bananas, on which the livelihood of the majority of its inhabitants depends, where various products are produced, marketed and exported, such as: cocoa, corn, coffee, rice, soybeans, passion fruit, pigeon peas, etc: standing out in the production of corn, for this reason Ventanas is known as the corn capital of Ecuador. In 2012 the Income Tax collected in Ventanas represented 8.8% of the total in the province of Los Ríos compared to 2010, it grew by 61.2%.

== Politics ==
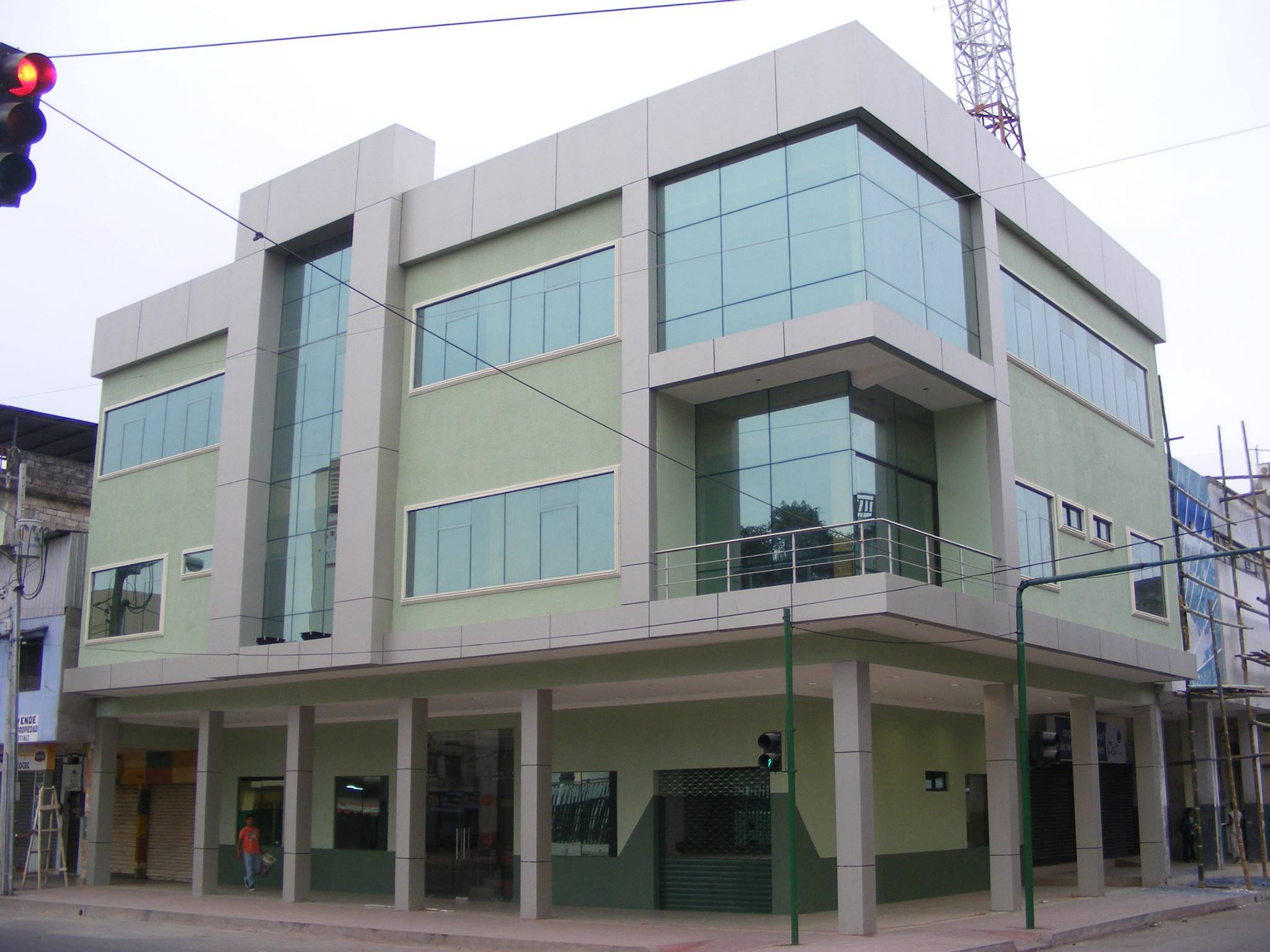
Ventanas City Hall

=== Gobernance ===
The city of Ventanas is governed by the Mayor's Office of Ventanas, whose representatives are elected every four years by universal suffrage of all citizens over 18 years of age. The body is chaired by the mayor of Ventanas, Rafael Sánchez Ochoa.

=== Urban parishes ===
In Ecuador, cantons are subdivided into parishes, so called because they were originally used by the Catholic Church, but with the secularization and liberalization of the Ecuadorian state, the political parishes were spun off the ones used by the church. Parishes are called urban if they are within the boundaries of the seat (capital) of their corresponding canton, and rural if outside those boundaries.

As of 2011, the municipality of Ventanas divided the city into 2 urban parishes. These parishes are as follows:

- Ventanas
- 10 de Noviembre

== Education ==
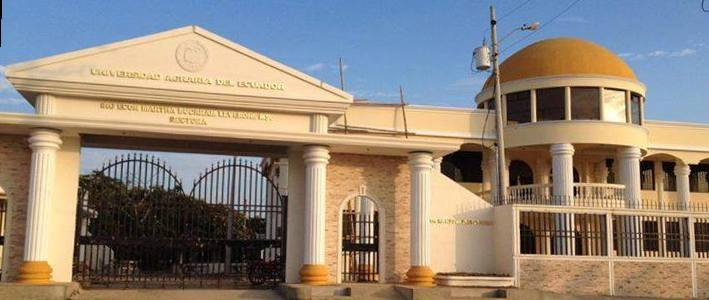
Universidad Agraria del Ecuador, campus Ventanas

=== University ===
Agrarian University of Ecuador (With its main campus in Guayaquil, the campus of the Ciudad Universitaria de Milagro (CUM) and academic activities at the venues of Ventanas, El Triunfo, Naranjal, Balzar, Pedro Carbo, Palestina and Palenque).

== Sport ==
The most followed sport in the city of Ventanas is soccer represented in the Second Category of the Second Category Provincial Championship of Los Ríos by the:

- El Guayacán Social, Cultural and Sports Club.

The stadium that the city has is the Enrique Muñoz Franco Stadium.

== Notable people ==
- Miss Ecuador 2016 Connie Jiménez (b. 1995, Ventanas) became a Governor
- Football Manager Humberto Pizarro (b. 1967, Ventanas)
- Footballer Jimmy Izquierdo (b. 1961, Ventanas – d. 1994, Guayaquil)
- Politician Jorge Escala (b.1970, Ventanas)
- Politician and Footballer Patricio Urrutia (b. 1977, Ventanas)
- Footballer Edwin Villafuerte (b. 1979, Ventanas)

== See also ==
- Ventanas Canton
- List of cities in Ecuador
- Los Ríos Province

== Sources ==
- World-Gazetteer.com
