= Chimbo =

- Town
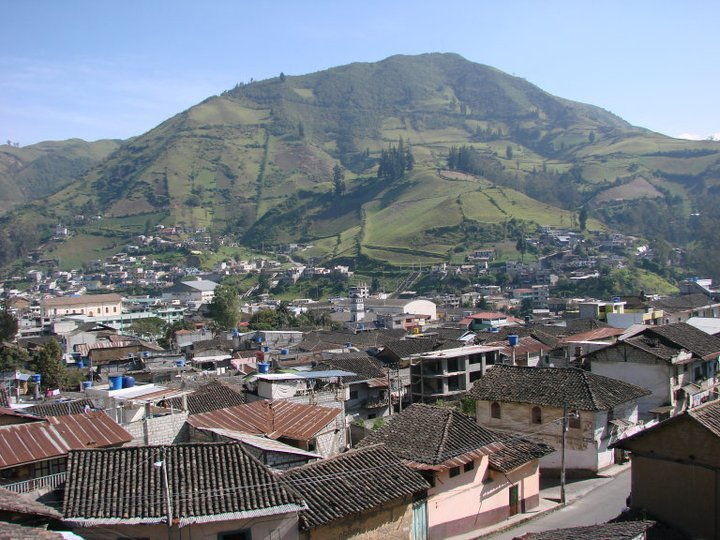

- Location within Ecuador
- Coordinates: 01°42′0″S 79°01′0″W
- Country: Ecuador
- Province: Bolívar Province
- Canton: Chimbo Canton

Government
  - Mayor: Víctor Hugo Lara Olalla

Area
  - Town: 1.31 km^{2} (0.51 sq mi)

Population (2022 census)
  - Town: 4,354
  - Density: 3,320/km^{2} (8,610/sq mi)
- Time zone: ECT
- Website: gobiernodebolivar.gov / Chimbo

Chimbo is a town in, and the seat of Chimbo Canton, Bolívar Province in Ecuador. The closest cities to Chimbo are Guaranda and San Miguel. Chimbo was once known as Benalcazar because the Spanish conquistador Sebastián de Belalcázar stayed there for several days before departing to Quito to fight the colonizers.

The town is sometimes referred to as La Olla or 'The Pot' due to the surrounding geography.
