= List of Miss Sweden titleholders =

List of women who held Miss Sweden titles in various pageant franchises

Swedish beauty pageants are competitions operating for Swedish females. Sweden had won two international pageants a total of three times as of 2010.

- Miss Sweden for Miss World used to be a handpicked delegate at the Miss Sweden pageant (in Swedish: Fröken Sverige). Sponsors were VeckoRevyn, female magazine that today operates in 21 countries worldwide. The title was dropped after a feminist wave throughout the Swedish nation and inside the magazine network itself during the 1990s. Broadcast at that time were TV4, between 1992 and 2000.
- Miss Sweden for Miss Universe used to be an official delegate at the Miss Sweden pageant (in Swedish: Fröken Sverige). The winner of this pageant had always higher expectations than the delegate competing at Miss World. Directors were from the female magazine VeckoRevyn. Last competition was arranged by the Moore! Magazine and received a lot of attention as the pageant was more free-minded than the previous one.
- Miss World Sweden was created in 2002 in response to Sweden's lack of interest in the Miss World pageant. Current sponsor is the female magazine Hänt Extra and broadcast by TV7.
- Miss Universe Sweden is currently a new pageant under sponsorship by Starworld Entertainment. It is broadcast by Star! Scandinavia. Rival contest is Nya Fröken Sverige (New Miss Sweden) arranged by Panos Emporio.

== Miss Sweden for Miss World (1951-2003; 2020-present) ==
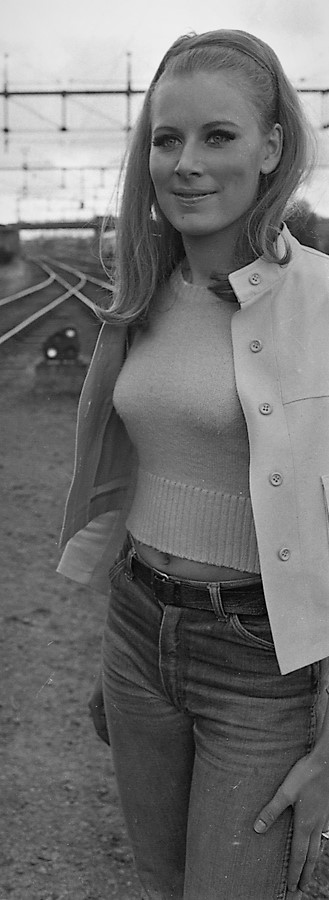
Gunilla Friden, Miss Sweden 1968, models at a train yard

- (VeckoRevyn 1951–2000) (TV3 2001–2003) (Miss Sweden Organization 2020–present)

Year	Name	Result
1951	Kerstin "Kiki" Håkansson†	MISS WORLD 1951
1952	May Louise Flodin†	MISS WORLD 1952
1953	Ingrid Johansson	
1954	Margareta Westling	
1955	Anita Åstrand	4th Runner Up
1956	Eva Bränn	4th Runner Up
1957	Ulla Edin	
1958	Margareta Wagström	3rd Runner Up
1959	Carola Håkansson	
1960	Barbro Olsson	
1961	Ingrid Lundqvist	
1962	Margareta Melin	
1963	Grete Qviberg	4th Runner Up
1964	Agneta Malmberg	
1965	Britt-Marie Lindblad	Top 15
1966	Gun-Inger Andersson	
1967	Eva Englander	Top 15
1968	Gunilla Friden	Top 15
1969	Ing-Marie Ahlin	
1970	Maj Johansson	3rd Runner Up
1971	Simonetta Kohl	Top 15
1972	Rita Berntsson	
1973	Mercy Nilsson	
1974	Jill Lindqvist	4th Runner Up
1975	Agneta Magnusson	
1976	Ann-Christine Gernandt	
1977	Mary Stävin	MISS WORLD 1977
1978	Ossie Carlsson	1st Runner Up
1979	Ing-Marie Säveby	
1980	Monika Jenemark	Top 15
1981	Carita Gustafsson	
1982	Annelie Sjöberg	
1983	Liza Törnqvist	
1984	Madeleine Gunnarsson	
1985	Anne-Bolette Christophersson	Top 15
1986	Marita Ulven	
1987	Charlotte Trydell	
1988	Cecilia Hörberg	Top 10
1989	Lena Berglind	
1990	Daniela Almen	
1991	Catrin Olsson	
1992	Ulrika Johansson	
1993	Victoria Silvstedt	Top 10
1994	Sofia Andersson	
1995	Jeanette Hassel	
1996	Åsa Johansson	
1997	Sofia Joelsson	
1998	Jessica Therese Almenäs	
1999	Louise Torsvik	
2000	Ida Manneh	
2001	Camilla Bäck	
2002	Sofia Hedmark	
2003	Isabelle Jonsson	Did not compete
2020	N/A	
2021	Gabriella Lomm Mann	
2022	N/A	
2023	Stina Nordlander	
2024	N/A	
2025	Isabelle Åhs	
2026	Bianca Lindström	

== Miss Sweden for Miss Universe (1952-2004) ==
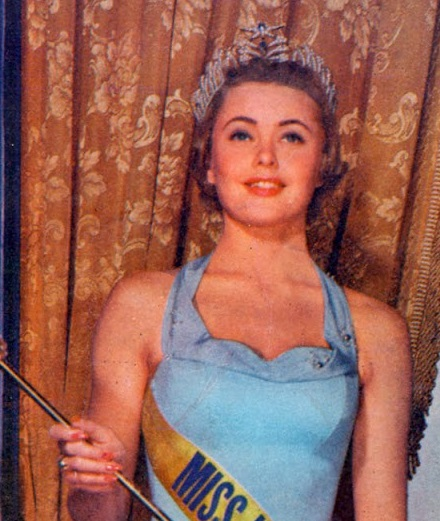
Miss Sweden Hillevi Rombin in 1955, who would go on to win Miss Universe

- (VeckoRevyn 1952–2000) (TV3 2001–2003) (Moore! 2004)

Year	Name	Result
1952	Anne Marie Thistler	Top 10
1953	Ulla Sandklef	
1954	Ragnhild Olausson	4th Runner Up
1955	Hillevi Rombin†	MISS UNIVERSE 1955
1956	Ingrid Goude	2nd Runner Up
1957	Inger Jonsson	Top 15
1958	Birgitta Gårdman	Top 15
1959	Marie Louise Ekström	Top 15
1960	Birgitta Öfling	
1961	Gunilla Knutsson	Top 15
1962	Karin Hyldegard Jensen	
1963	Kerstin Jonsson	
1964	Siv Åberg	4th Runner Up
1965	Ingrid Norrman	3rd Runner Up
1966	Margareta Arvidsson	MISS UNIVERSE 1966
1967	Eva-Lisa Svensson	Top 15
1968	Anne Marie Hellqvist	Top 15
1969	Birgitta Lindloff	Top 15
1970	Kristina Wayborn	Top 15
1971	Vivian Öihanen	
1972	Britt Marie Johansson	
1973	Monica Sundin	
1974	Eva-Christine Römpke	
1975	Catharina Sjödahl	3rd Runner Up
1976	Caroline Westerberg	
1977	Birgitta Lindvall	
1978	Cecilia Björnsdotter Rodhe	4th Runner Up
1979	Anette Ekström	4th Runner Up
1980	Eva Birgitta Andersson	4th Runner Up
1981	Eva-Lena Lundgren	3rd Runner Up
1982	Anna Kari Bergström	
1983	Viveka Ljung	
1984	Yvonne Ryding	MISS UNIVERSE 1984
1985	Carina Marklund	
1986	Anna Lena Rahmberg	
1987	Suzanne Thörngren	Top 10
1988	Annika Davidsson	
1989	Louise Drevenstam	1st Runner Up
1990	Linda Isacsson	
1991	Susanna Gustafsson	
1992	Monica Brodd	Top 10
1993	Johanna Lind	
1994	Domenique Forsberg	Top 10
1995	Petra Hultgren	
1996	Annika Duckmark	Top 10
1997	Victoria Lagerström	Top 10
1998	Jessica Olérs	
1999	Emma Helena Nilsson	
2000	Valerie Aflalo	
2001	Malin Olsson	
2002	Malou Hansson	
2003	Helena Stenbäck	
2004	Katarina Wigander	
2005	N/A	

== New Miss Sweden (Nya Fröken Sverige) for Miss Universe (2006-2009) ==
- (Panos Emporio 2006-2009)

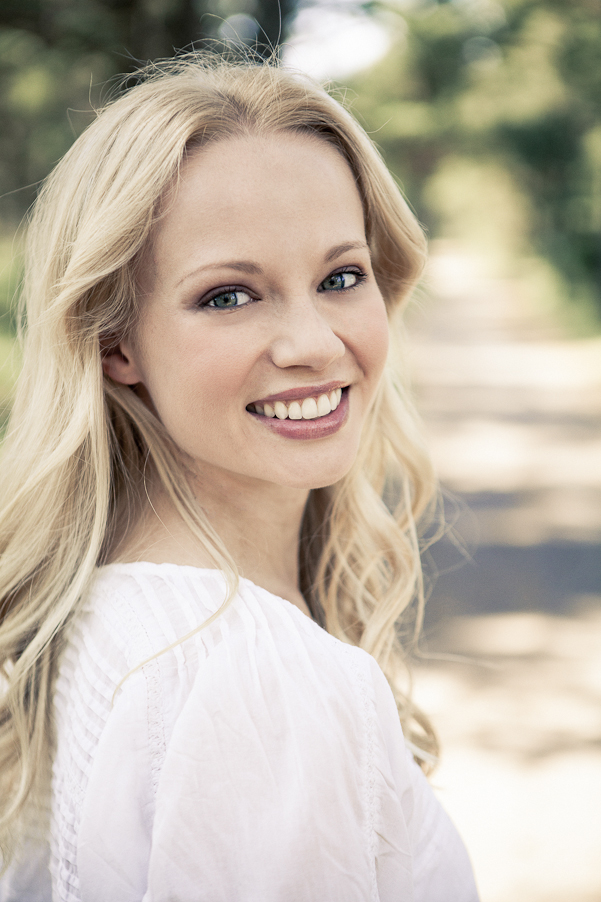
Josephine Alhanko, model, actress, and former Miss Sweden

Year	Name	Result
2006	Josephine Alhanko	Top 20
2007	Isabel Lestapier Winqvist	Did not compete
2008	Lina Hahne	Did not compete
2009	Azra Duliman	Did not compete

== Miss Sweden for Miss Europe ==
- (VeckoRevyn 1949–1984) (Swedish Models 1985–Present)

Year	Name	Result
1936	Birgit Engquist	
1938	Doris Lundh	
1948	Betty Bjurström	Did not compete
1949	Kerstin Ringberg†	
1950	Ebba Adrian	2nd Runner Up
1952	Anne Marie Thistler	
1953	Marianne Thörnqvist	Top 15
1954	Gunilla Johansson	3rd Runner Up
1955	Hillevi Larsson	
1956	Ingrid Goude	1st Runner Up
1957	Rigmor Alfredsson	
1958	Marie-Louise Hjelm	
1959	Monica Nordqvist	
1960	Monica Abrahamsson	2nd Runner Up
1961	Ingrid Andersson	2nd Runner Up
1962	Birgitta Lundberg	4th Runner Up
1963	Greta Qviberg	3rd Runner Up
1964	Siv Åberg	2nd Runner Up
1965	Ingrid Norrman	2nd Runner Up
1966	Gun-Inger Andersson	2nd Runner Up
1967	Annika Hemminge	3rd Runner Up
1968	Ann-Christine Kahnberg	2nd Runner Up
1969	Ulla Adsten	4th Runner Up
1970	Marie-Louise Nordlund	Did not compete
1971	Lena Arvidsson	2nd Runner Up
1972	Elisabeth Johansson	1st Runner Up
1973	Christine Göthlander	
1974	UNKNOWN	
1976	Caroline Westerberg	
1978	Evonne Wilhelmsson	
1980	Christina Bolinder	3rd Runner Up
1981	Eva-Lena Lundgren	
1982	Annelie Sjöberg	1st Runner Up
1984	Viveka Ljung	
1985	Cecilia Gullin	
1988	Annelie Eriksson	Top 15
1991	Marlene Quick	Top 10
1992	Jeanette Lindström	
1993	Christina Gustafsson	
1994	Johanna Lundgren	
1995	Sofie Tocklin	2nd Runner Up
1996	Anna Olin	
1997	Jessica Johansson	Did not compete
1999	Malin Jonsson	Top 15
2001	Elisabeth Halle	
2003	Caroline Österberg	
2005	Marie Dahlin	
2006	Cecilia Zetterlöf Harbo Kristensen	

== Miss Sweden for Miss International (1960-2008; 2021-present) ==
- (Årent Runt 1960–1994) (Fashion For Integration 2000–2008) (Miss Sweden Organization 2021–present)

Year	Name	Result
1960	Gunilla Elm	
1961	Elisabeth Oden	
1962	Karin Hyldegaard Jensen	
1963	Riina Krusvik	Top 15
1964	Birgitta Alverljung	Top 15
1965	Agneta Holst	
1967	Gun Sundberg	Top 15
1968	Annika Hemminge	1st Runner Up
1969	Bodil Jensen	
1970	Rita Rudolfsson Berntsson	
1971	Maud Andersson	
1972	Eva Andersson	
1974	Monica Söderqvist	Top 15
1975	Kicki Anita Olsson	Top 15
1976	Marie Borhäll	Top 15
1977	Lena Jernberg	
1978	Birgitta Eriksson	
1979	Anna Ingela Bratt	
1981	Anna Helena Lindgow	Top 15
1982	Camilla Engström	
1984	Gunilla Kohlström	2nd Runner Up
1986	Suzanna Lundmark	Top 15
1988	Ulrika Helena Westerberg	
1989	Isabelle Soelmann	
1990	Monica Andersson	Top 15
1991	Charlotte Wallden	
1992	Camilla Unsgaard	
1993	Anna Hovenstam	
1994	Mirja Haglöf	Top 15
2000	Gabrielle Heinerborg	Top 15
2001	Sara Nicole Cameron	
2002	Emelie Lundqvist	
2005	Cecilia Zetterlöf Kristensen	Top 15
2008	Jenny Jansson	

== Miss Sweden for Miss Scandinavia ==
- Monica Rågby
- Birgitta Alverljung
- Gun Sundberg
- Eva-Lisa Svensson
- Gunilla Friden
- Ing-Marie Ahlin
- Christina Bolinder
- Eva Andersson
- Eva-Lena Lundgren
- Bolette Christopherson
- Annelie Eriksson
- Britt-Inger Johansson
- Wivianne "Vivi" Öiangen

== Miss Sweden for Miss Earth (2020-present) ==
- (Miss Sweden Organization 2020–present)

Year	Name	Result
2020	Gabriella Lomm Mann	
2021	Linn Bjurström Salonen	
2022	TBA	TBD

== Miss Earth Sweden (2003-2019) ==
- (Carousel Productions 2003-2013) (Starworld Sweden 2011–2019)

Year	Name	Result
2003	Caroline Sonath	
2004	Sara Jelena Lundemo	
2005	Therese Denitton	
2006	Cecilia Zetterlöf Kristensen	
2007	Ivana Gagula	Top 16
2008	Fanny Blomé	
2009	Giulia Simone Olsson	
2010	N/A	
2011	Renate Cerljen	Top 16
2012	Camilla Hansson	
2013	Denice Andrée	
2014	Frida Fornander	
2015	Maria Taipaleenmäki	
2016	Cloie Syquia Skarne	Top 8
2017	Camilla Fogestedt	
2018	Yasmine Mindru	
2019	N/A	

== Miss International Sweden (2011-2020) ==
- (Starworld Entertainment 2011-2020)

Year	Name	Result
2011	Denice Andrée	Top 15
2012	Katarina Konow	
2013	Eleonore Lilja	
2014	Moa Sandberg	
2015	Isabella Jedler Forsman	Did not compete
2016	Maria Taipaleenmäki	
2017	Lina Ljungberg	
2018	Izabell Hahn	
2019	Paulina Kielczewska	
2020	N/A	

== Miss World Sweden (2003-2019) ==
- (Hänt Extra 2003-2019)

Year	Name	Result
2003	Ida Söfringsgärd	
2004	Helena Hjertonsson	
2005	Liza Berggren	
2006	Cathrine Skoog	
2007	Annie Oliv	4th Runner Up
2008	Jennifer Palm Lundberg	
2009	Erica Harrison	
2010	Daniela Karlsson	
2011	Nicoline Artursson	Top 15
2012	Sanna Jinnedal	Top 30 & Miss World Sports
2013	Agneta Myhrman	
2014	Olivia Asplund	Top 25 & Miss World Beach Beauty
2015	Natalia Fogelund	
2016	Emma Strandberg	
2017	Hanna Haag	Top 40
2018	Amanda Wiberg	Did not compete
2019	Daniella Lundqvist	

== Miss Universe Sweden (2009-present) ==
- (Starworld Entertainment 2009–present)

Year	Name	Result
2009	Renate Veronica Cerljen	Top 15
2010	Michaela Savic	
2011	Ronnia Fornstedt	
2012	Hanni Beronius	
2013	Alexandra Friberg	
2014	Camilla Hansson	
2015	Paulina Brodd	
2016	Ida Ovmar	
2017	Frida Fornander	
2018	Emma Strandberg	
2019	Lina Ljungberg	
2020	N/A	
2021	Moa Sandberg	
2022	N/A	
2023	N/A	
2024	N/A	
2025	Daniella Lundqvist	
2026	TBD	
