= Michaela Savić =

Swedish model

- Born: Michaela Savić; 14 March 1991 (age 35); Helsingborg, Skåne County, Sweden
- Height: 1.74 m (5 ft 8 1/2 in)
- Beauty pageant titleholder
- Title: Miss Universe Sweden 2010
- Hair color: Brown
- Major competitions: Miss Universe Sweden 2010 (Winner); Miss Universe 2010 (Unplaced)

Michaela Savić (Serbian: Михаела Савић, romanized: Mihaela Savić) (born 14 March 1991 Helsingborg, Skåne) is a Swedish model and beauty pageant titleholder who was crowned Miss Universe Sweden 2010. She attended Miss Universe 2010 in Las Vegas on 23 August 2010. She has been a model since the age of 14 and attended to several castings, plays and fashion shows. Savic placed second in Miss Universe Sweden 2009, behind Renate Cerljen. Savić is the second Miss Universe Sweden to represent Sweden in Miss Universe since the Miss Sweden pageant lost the right for the international final in 2009.

Awards and achievements
Preceded by Renate Cerljen	Miss Universe Sweden; 2010	Succeeded by Ronnia Fornstedt
