= Camilla Hansson =

Swedish actress, model and beauty pageant titleholder

- Born: Camilla Hansson; 11 October 1988 (age 37); Stockholm, Sweden
- Height: 1.73 m (5 ft 8 in)
- Beauty pageant titleholder
- Title: Miss Earth Sweden 2012; Miss Sweden 2014
- Hair color: Brown
- Eye color: Brown
- Major competitions: Miss Sweden 2012 (Miss Earth Sweden); Miss Earth 2012; Miss Sweden 2014 (Winner); Miss Universe 2014 (Unplaced)

Camilla Hansson (born 11 October 1988) is a Swedish actress, fashion model and beauty pageant titleholder who was crowned Miss Sweden 2014 and represented her country at the Miss Universe 2014 pageant. Previously, she was crowned as Miss Earth Sweden 2012 but did not place at the Miss Earth 2012.

== Early life ==
Since the age of eighteen Hansson lives and resides in London, England.

== Pageantry ==
=== Miss Earth Sweden 2012 ===
Hansson was crowned as the second title of Miss Universe Sweden pageant, Miss Earth Sweden 2012.

=== Miss Earth 2012 ===
Hansson represented Sweden at Miss Earth 2012 in Manila, Philippines. She held the title of Miss Earth Sweden 2012.

=== Miss Universe Sweden 2014 ===
Hansson was crowned as Miss Sweden 2014 or called as Miss Universe Sweden 2014 on 28 March 2014.

== Awards and achievements ==
Awards and achievements
Preceded by Alexandra Friberg	Miss Universe Sweden; 2014	Succeeded by Paulina Brodd
Preceded by Renate Cerljen	Miss Earth Sweden; 2012	Succeeded by Denice Andrée
