= Miss Europe 1953 =

International beauty pageant

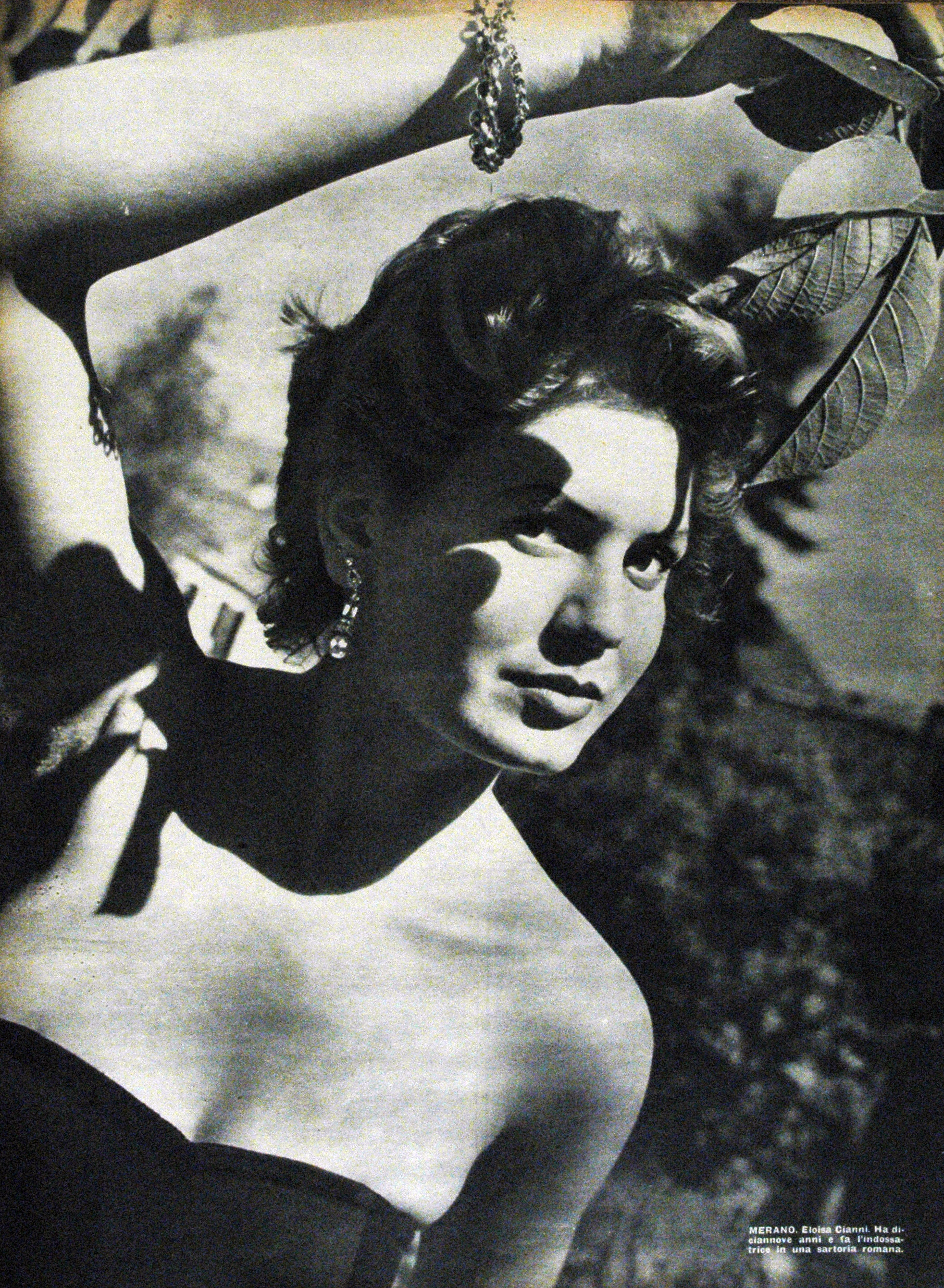
- Eloisa Cianni
- Date: September 9, 1953
- Venue: Istanbul, Turkey
- Entrants: 13
- Placements: 3
- Debuts: Monte Carlo
- Withdrawals: Ireland
- Winner: Eloisa Cianni; Italy

Miss Europe 1953 was the 16th edition of the Miss Europe pageant, held in Istanbul, Turkey on 9 September 1953. At the end of the event, Günseli Başar of Turkey crowned Eloisa Cianni of Italy as Miss Europe 1953.

Contestants from thirteen countries competed in this year's pageant.

== Results ==
=== Placements ===
Placement	Contestant
Miss Europe 1953	Italy – Eloisa Cianni
1st runner-up	England – Marlene Ann Dee
2nd runner-up	France – Sylviane Carpentier

== Contestants ==
=== Selection of participants ===
Contestants from thirteen countries competed in this edition. This edition saw the debut of Monte Carlo, and the withdrawal of Ireland.

=== List of contestants ===
Thirteen contestants competed for the title.

Country/Territory	Contestant	Age (Note: Ages at the time of the pageant)	Hometown
Austria	Lore Felger	18	Vienna
Belgium	Sépia Degehet	–	Brussels
England	Marlene Ann Dee	21	Weston Road
Finland	Maija-Riitta Tuomaala	19	Lahti
France	Sylviane Carpentier	19	Dreuil-lès-Amiens
Germany	Marie-Louise Nagel	27	–
Greece	Antouanetta Rontopoulou	23	Athens
Holland	Yvonne Meijer	20	Haarlem
Italy	Eloisa Cianni	21	Rome
Monte Carlo	Elisabeth Chovisky	18	Monte Carlo
Sweden	Marianna Törnqvist	–	Stockholm
Switzerland	Eliane Pade	18	Bulle
Turkey	Belgin Doruk	17	Istanbul

== Miss Casino 1953 ==
Miss Casino 1953
- Date: 7 March 1953
- Venue: Amsterdam, Holland
- Entrants: 9
- Placements: 3
- Debuts: Ireland
- Withdrawals: Belgium; Cannes (France); Great Britain; Seville (Spain); Switzerland
- Returns: England
- Winner: Lore Felger; Austria

Miss Casino 1953 was the third edition of the Miss Europe pageant organized by the "Comité Officiel et International Miss Europe", held in Amsterdam, Netherlands on 7 March 1953. At the end of the event, Judy Breen of Great Britain crowned Lore Felger of Austria as Miss Casino Amsterdam-1953.

Nine contestants from eight countries competed in this year's pageant.

=== Placements ===
Placement	Contestant
Miss Europa 1953	Austria – Lore Felger
1st runner-up	Sweden – Anne Marie Thistler
2nd runner-up	England – Patricia Butler; France – Chantal Mabileau

=== List of contestants ===
Nine contestants from eight countries competed for the title.

Country/Territory	Contestant	Age	Hometown
Austria	Lore Felger	18	Vienna
Denmark	Elsa Mende	–	Copenhagen
England	Patricia Butler	–	Liverpool
France	Chantal Mabileau	22	Paris
Germany	Ingrid Gruner	–	Stuttgart
Holland	Fanny Weitner	–	Amsterdam
Holland	Edith Manvis	–	Amsterdam
Ireland	Mary McCormick	18	Dublin
Sweden	Anne Marie Thistler	20	Stockholm
