= Beronius =

Beronius is a surname. Notable people with the surname include:

- Hanni Beronius (born 1990), Swedish beauty queen
- Magnus Beronius (1692–1775), Swedish archbishop
