= Malin Olsson =

Swedish singer, model and television presenter

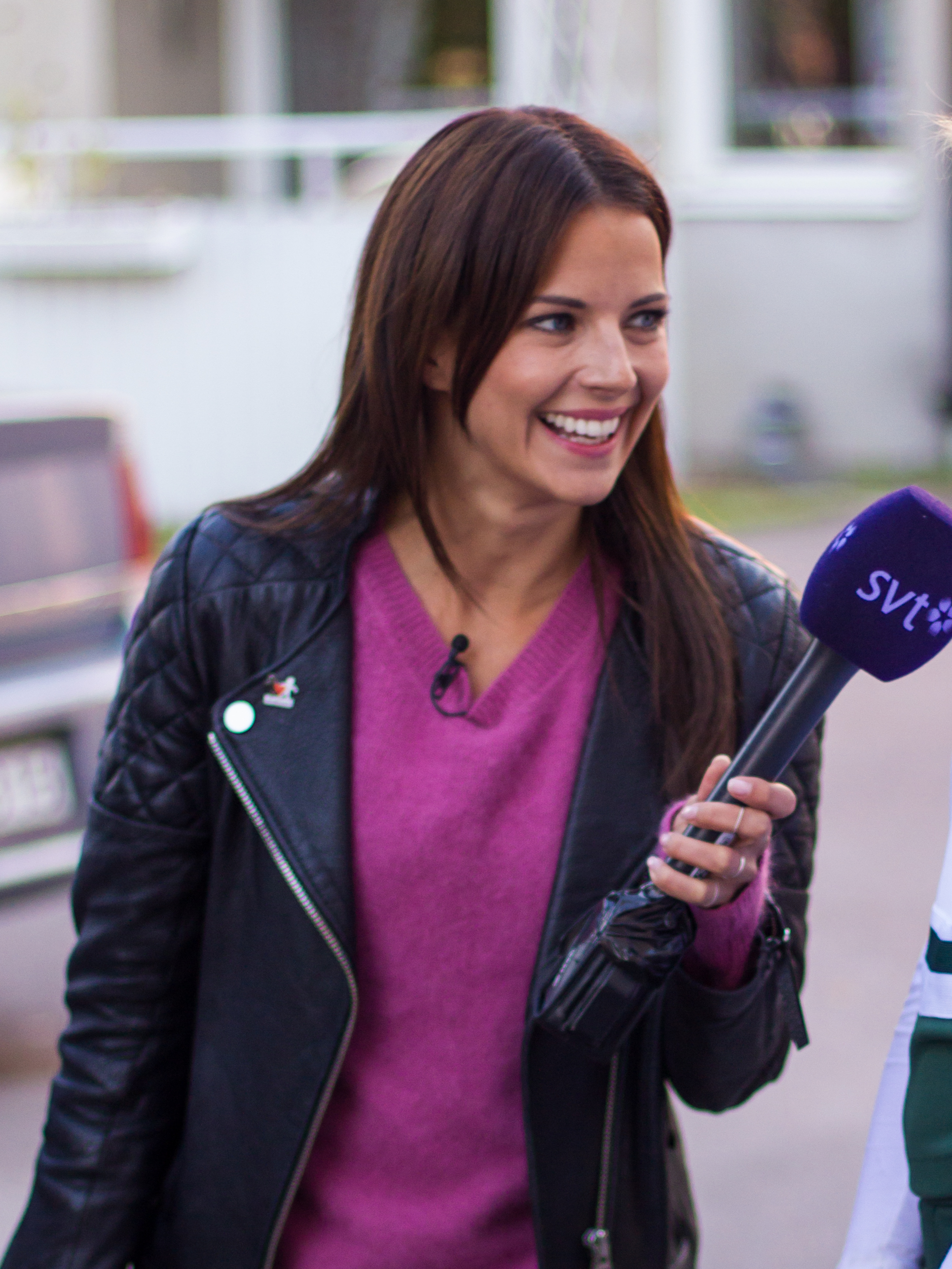
- Malin Olsson in Hedemora in September 2013
- Born: 19 March 1982 (age 43); Skattungbyn, Sweden
- Occupations: television presenter, singer
- Years active: 2001–

Malin Isabel Sofie Dos Santos Cardoso Olsson (born 19 March 1982) is a Swedish television presenter, actress, former singer and beauty pageant titleholder.

== Career ==
Olsson was crowned Miss Sweden in 2001, Olsson went on to represent Sweden in Miss Universe 2001 in Puerto Rico. After ending her reign as Miss Sweden she signed on to becoming a member of the girl music group NG3 which released a few successful music singles between 2002 and 2003 and then disbanded. In 2005, Olsson was headhunted by The Voice TV in Sweden and Vecko Revyn to host a show on the music network, soon afterwards she was hired by SVT to present the kids show Bobster which she has presented since.

Olsson has been presenting the SVT kids show Sommarlov since 2010, and has also presented the game show Minuten, Magiskt and Hela Sveriges Fredag amongst other shows also on SVT.
