= Miss Earth Sweden =

Beauty contest in Sweden

- Formation: 2003-2025
- Type: Beauty Pageant
- Headquarters: Stockholm
- Location: Sweden
- Members: Miss Earth
- Official language: Swedish
- Website: Official website

Miss Earth Sweden is a beauty pageant for Swedish women between 18–27 years old. The winner of the pageant competes in the global beauty pageant, Miss Earth, held each year in the Philippines.

The main issues of the contest are environmental causes and the preservation of the Earth.

The Swedish supervisor of the franchise was, until 2011, Roberto Strindstedt.

In 2011, the Miss Universe Sweden organization bought the rights for crowning Miss Earth Sweden, and for Miss Earth 2011 they choose Renate Cerljen.

== Titleholders ==
- : Declared as Winner
- : Ended as runner-up or elemental winner
- : Ended as one of the finalists or semifinalists
- : Ended as special awards winner

Year	Miss Earth Sweden	Placement
2003	Caroline Donath	
2004	Sara Jilena Lundemo	
2005	Therese Denitton	
2006	Cecilia Kristensen	
2007	Ivana Gagula	Top 16
2008	Fanny Blomé	
2009	Giulia Simone Olsson	
2011	Renate Cerljen	Top 16
2012	Camilla Hansson	
2013	Denice Andrée	
2014	Frida Fornander	
2015	Maria Taipaleenmäki	
2016	Cloie Syquia Skarne	Top 8
2017	Camilla Fogestedt	
2018	Yasmine Mindru	
2020	Gabriella Lomm Mann	
2021	Linn Bjurström Salonen	
2025	Tilde Lööw	
2026	Isabelle Åhs	TBA
