= Fanny Blomé =

Swedish model (born 1989)

Fanny Blomé (born 1989 in Norrköping) is a Swedish model and beauty pageant titleholder who won Miss Earth Sweden 2008. She succeeded Ivana Gagula in October 2008 and represented Sweden in one of the world's three biggest international contests, Miss Earth. The beauty pageant which focuses on the environment took place in the Philippines (November 2008). Blomé was one of two Swedish citizens in the Miss Earth 2008 pageant, alongside Miss Kosovo, Yllka Berisha. Blomé was one of the few blondes in the contest.

Blomé had a great career on the rise played as basketball player in Norrköping Dolphins but quit and joined the Swedish Armed Forces. She was chief of her platoon when she entered the Swedish military in the northeast part of Sweden, Boden, in 2009.

Blomé was also a contestant in Sweden's version of Top Model some years back along with her two years older sister.
