= Frida Fornander =

Swedish model and beauty queen winner

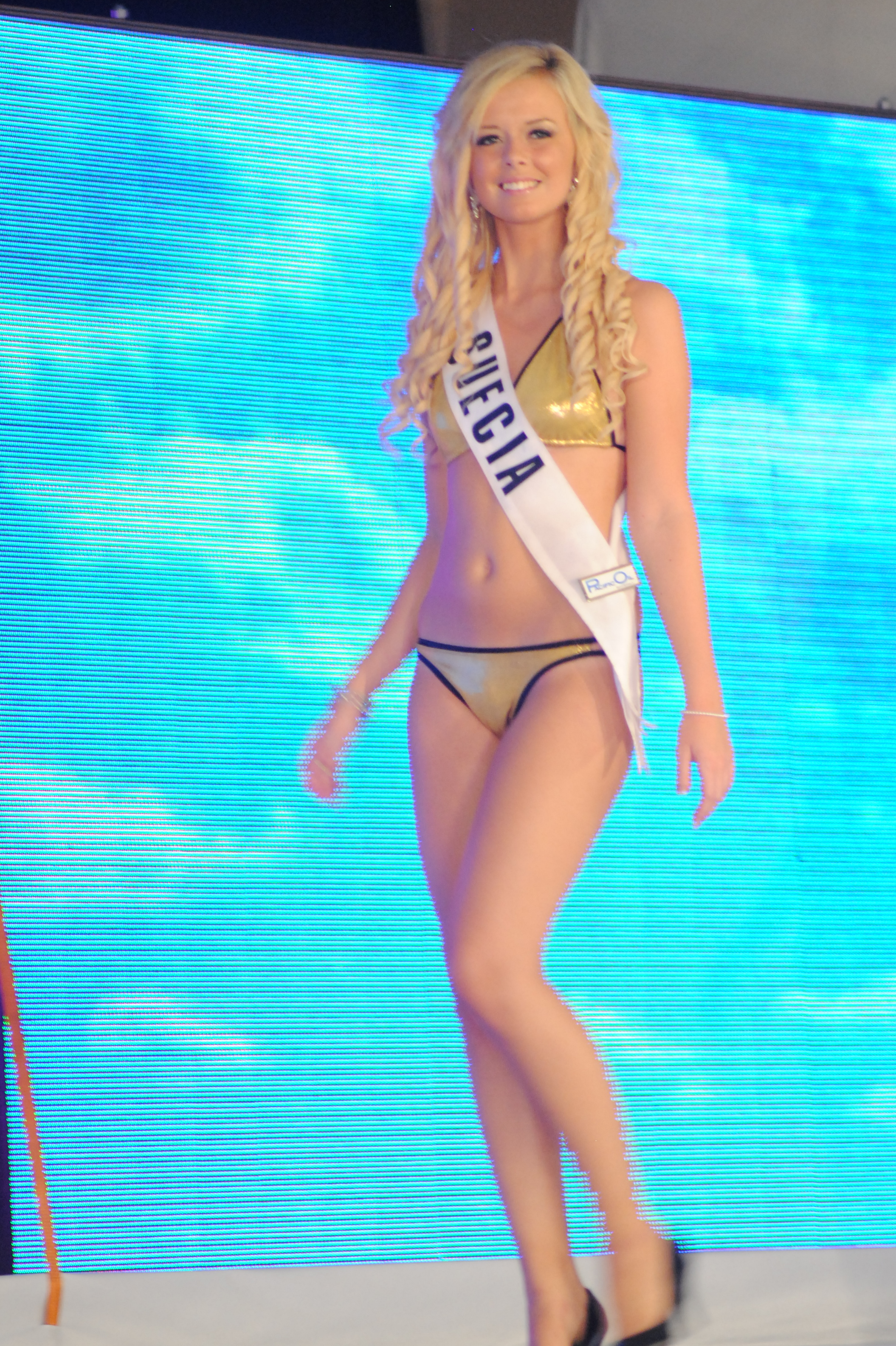
- Frida Fornander (2011)
- Born: 4 July 1995 (age 31); Gothenburg, Sweden
- Occupation: Model
- Height: 1.77 m (5 ft 10 in)
- Beauty pageant titleholder
- Title: Miss Earth Sweden 2014; Miss Universe Sweden 2017
- Hair color: Blonde
- Eye color: Blue
- Major competitions: Miss Earth Sweden 2014 (Winner); Miss Earth 2014 (Unplaced); Miss Universe Sweden 2017 (Winner); Miss Universe 2017 (Unplaced)

Frida Maria Fornander (born 4 July 1995) is a Swedish model and beauty pageant titleholder. She was crowned Miss Earth Sweden 2014, and competed in Miss Earth 2014. Later, she also won Miss Universe Sweden 2017 and competed in Miss Universe 2017.

Prior to competing in Miss Earth, Fornander had already won the titles of Miss Teenager Sweden 2011 and Miss Teen Model Universe 2012. Fornander has been working as an international model since 2011.

Awards and achievements
Preceded by Ida Ovmar	Miss Universe Sweden; 2017	Succeeded by Emma Strandberg
Preceded by Denice Andrée	Miss Earth Sweden; 2014	Succeeded by Maria Taipaleenmäki
