= Staffanstorp =

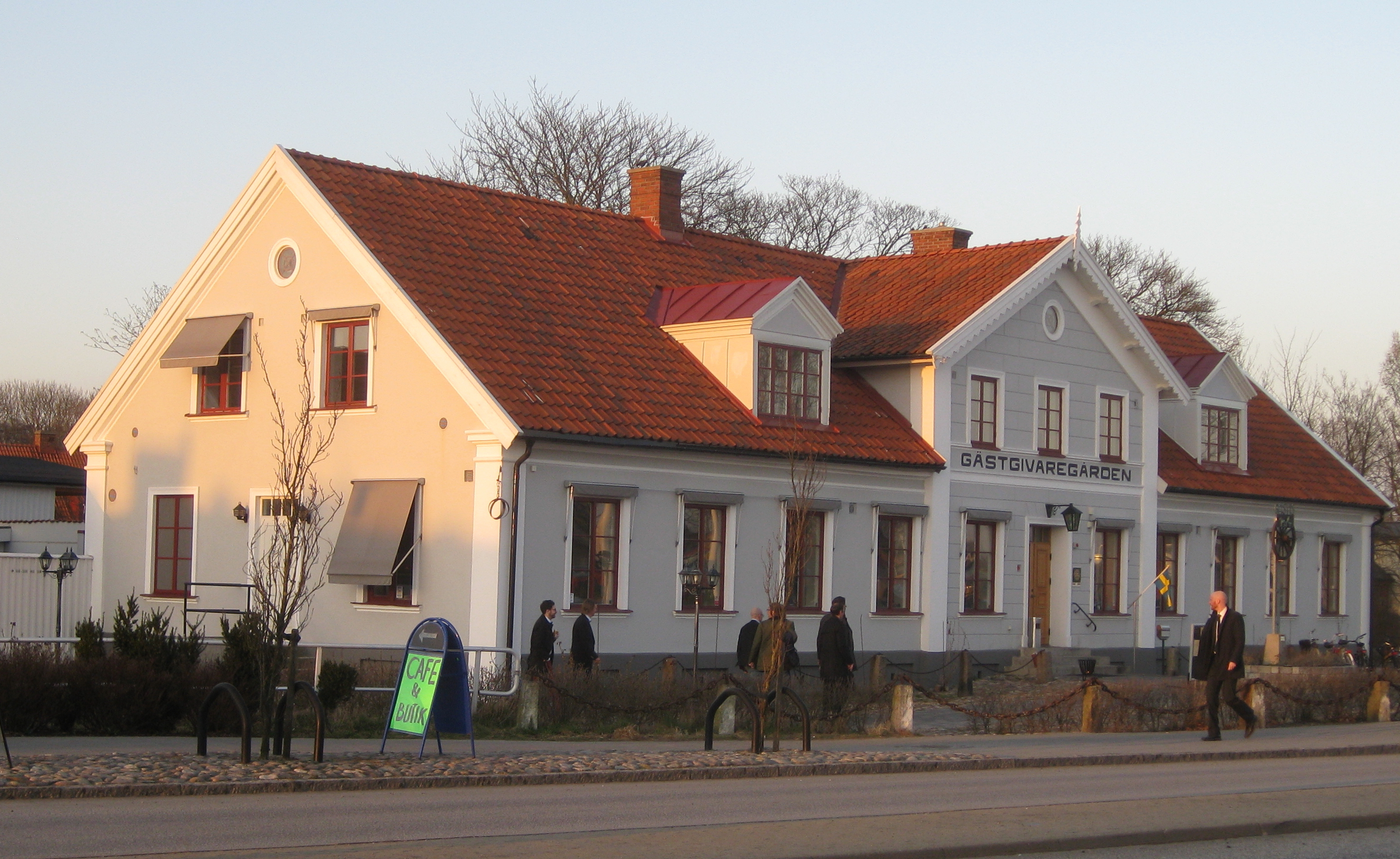
- Staffanstorps gästgivaregård in March 2012

- Coat of arms

- Location within Skåne Location within Sweden
- Coordinates: 55°38′N 13°12′E
- Country: Sweden
- Province: Skåne
- County: Skåne County
- Municipality: Staffanstorp Municipality

Area
  - Total: 6.63 km^{2} (2.56 sq mi)

Population (31 December 2022)
  - Total: 31,718
  - Density: 2,235/km^{2} (5,790/sq mi)
- Time zone: UTC+1 (CET)
  - Summer (DST): UTC+2 (CEST)

Staffanstorp is a locality and the seat of Staffanstorp Municipality, Skåne County, Sweden with 14,808 inhabitants in 2010. Staffanstorp is the largest Scanian settlement that never acquired town privileges before their abolishment in Sweden in 1971.

== Geography ==
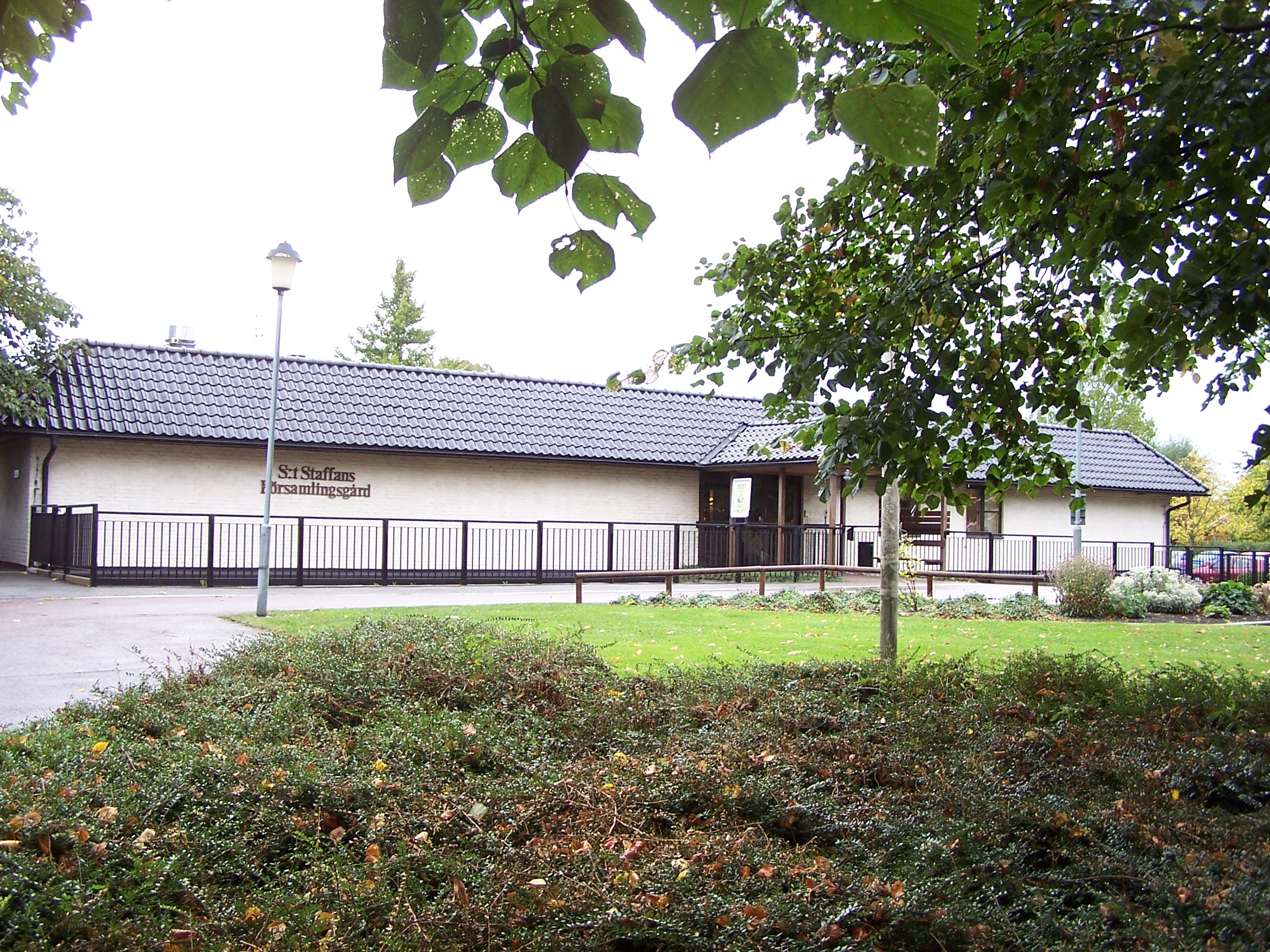
Staffanstorp has a suburban character dominated by 1- and 1½-story buildings.

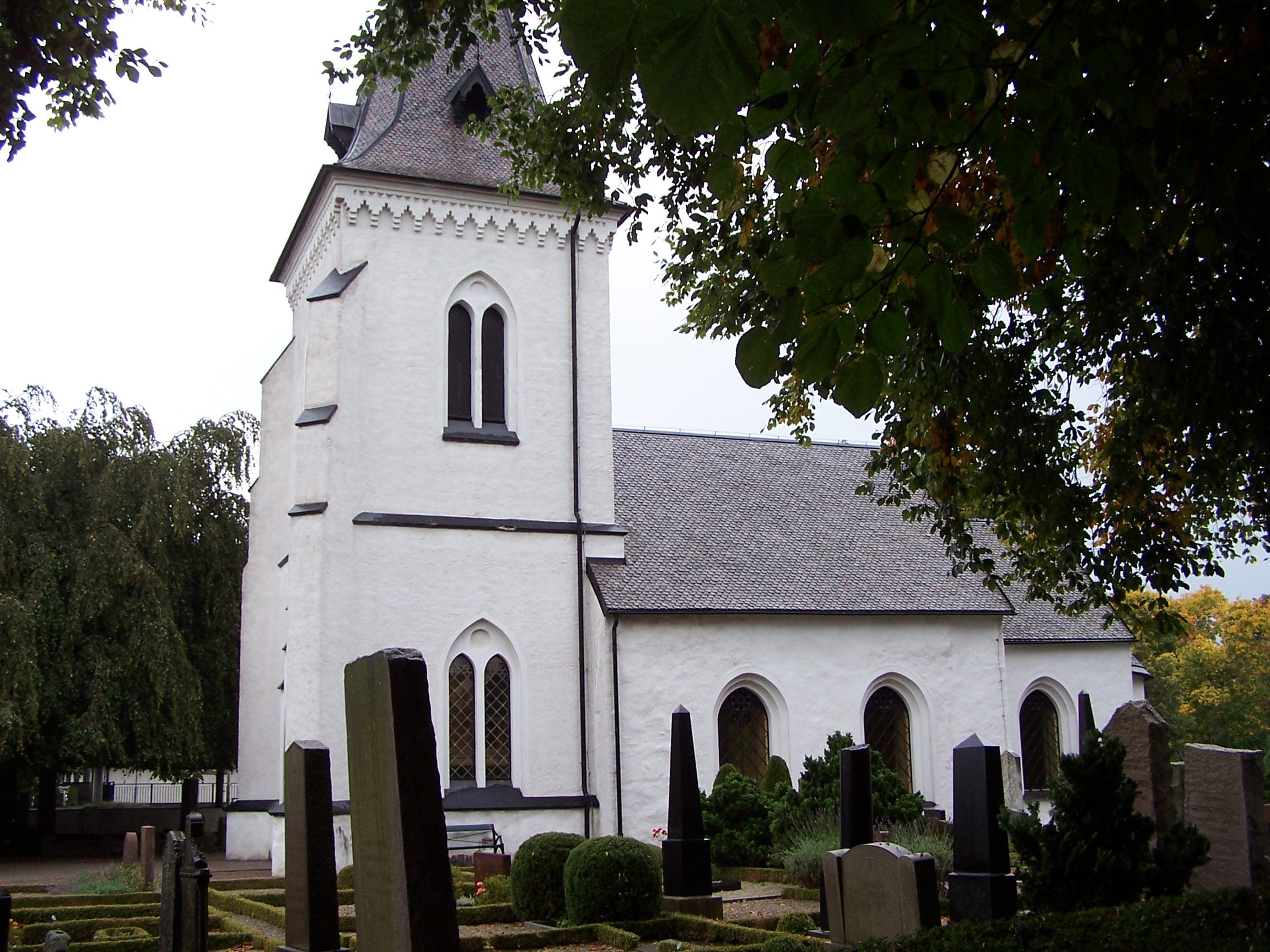
The 12th century Brågarp Church. The church tower, however, is a 19th-century extension

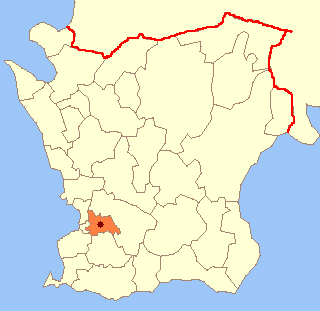
Location of the town and municipality of Staffanstorp

The town is located at the centre of a large triangular fertile plain which reaches approximately 25 kilometres from the Øresund strait inwards in Scania. The base of the triangle follows the coast, approximately 25 kilometres starting in Malmö in the south.

== History ==
As a village, it was mentioned in 14th-century sources, but it would remain fairly insignificant in the shadow of more important towns such as Lund, Dalby and Malmö. An inn and the local hundred jail with two cells were located there in the 19th century.

Staffanstorp has been the site for Housing Trade Shows, the first in 1970 with 43 furnished homes and 100.000 paying visitors, and the most recent in 1997 with 25 exhibited homes. In the 1990s, the town centre was recreated, taking inspiration from New Urbanism. The unpopular buildings from the 1960s were covered by new roofs, façades and more stories built in a traditional Scanian pastiche architectural style. A couple of multi-storey buildings were constructed on a lot that had previously been the local stadium, and the road plan was further complicated to make drivers slow down and, if possible, avoid going through the centre.

== Schools ==
Staffanstorp has two högstadieskola schools (senior level of compulsory school), Baldersskolan and Hagalidskolan. As of 2023, approximately 3500 students are enrolled in all schools in Staffanstorp.

Baldersskolan (formerly called Centralskolan until 2013) is located in the central part of Staffanstorp. The school houses students between the ages of 6 and 15 or F–9th grade. Baldersskolan also has matteprofilen in 7th–9th grade, where students can study matte 1c (high school level math) in 9th grade.

Hagalidskolan also has an MFF academy.

Internationella Engelska Skolan Staffanstorp opened in August 2022. It is an independent school from F-Klass to Year 9. In 2022, 450 students were enrolled in the school.

== Notable people ==
- Renate Cerljen, Miss Universe Sweden 2009
- Dick Harrison, historian
- Anders Johnsson, sport shooter
- Malin Strömberg, swimmer in the 1992 Summer Olympics
- Anders Jansson, comedian
- Jonas Ridderstråle, business speaker and author
