= Miss Europe 1954 =

International beauty pageant

- Date: 20 June 1954
- Venue: Vichy, France
- Entrants: 13
- Placements: 5
- Withdrawals: Monte Carlo; Portugal; Spain; Turkey
- Returns: Ireland; Poland
- Winner: Christel Schaack (dethroned); West Germany; Danièle Génault (assumed); France

Miss Europe 1954 was the 17th edition of the Miss Europe pageant, held in Vichy, France on 20 June 1954.

At the end of the event, Christel Schaack of Germany was crowned as Miss Europe 1954 by Eloisa Cianni of Italy. However, it was later revealed that Schaack was a widow and thus was disqualified from Miss Europe and stripped of her crown. The crown then went to the 1st runner-up Danièle Génault of France, while Schaack was given the title "Honorary Miss Europe".

Contestants from thirteen countries competed in this year's pageant.

== Results ==
=== Placements ===
Placement	Contestant
Miss Europe 1954	West Germany – Christel Schaack (dethroned)
1st runner-up	France – Danièle Génault (assumed)
2nd runner-up	Finland – Yvonne de Bruyn
3rd runner-up	Sweden – Gunilla Johansson
4th runner-up	Greece – Eva Brika

== Contestants ==
=== Selection of participants ===
Contestants from thirteen countries competed in this edition. This edition saw the returns of Ireland and Poland, and the withdrawals of Monte Carlo, Portugal, Spain, and Turkey. Juanita Billa of Spain was not allowed to compete due to not being an official Miss Spain titleholder. Billa was elected by tourists in Biarritz, France in 1953.

=== List of contestants ===
Thirteen contestants competed for the title.

Country/Territory	Contestant	Age (Note: Ages at the time of the pageant)	Hometown
Austria	Felicitas Göbel	22	Vienna
Belgium	–	–	–
England	June Peters	18	Manchester
Finland	Yvonne de Bruyn	20	Helsinki
France	Danièle Génault	19	Paris
Greece	Eva Brika	17	Athens
Holland	Conny Harteveld	22	Leiden
Ireland	Sheila Lee	18	Dublin
Italy	Nadia Bianchi	19	Rome
Poland	Kasindria Klimezak	–	–
Sweden	Gunilla Johansson	–	–
Switzerland	Claudine Chaperon	20	Lausanne
West Germany	Christel Schaack	25	Berlin
