= Miss Universe 1996 =

45th Miss Universe pageant

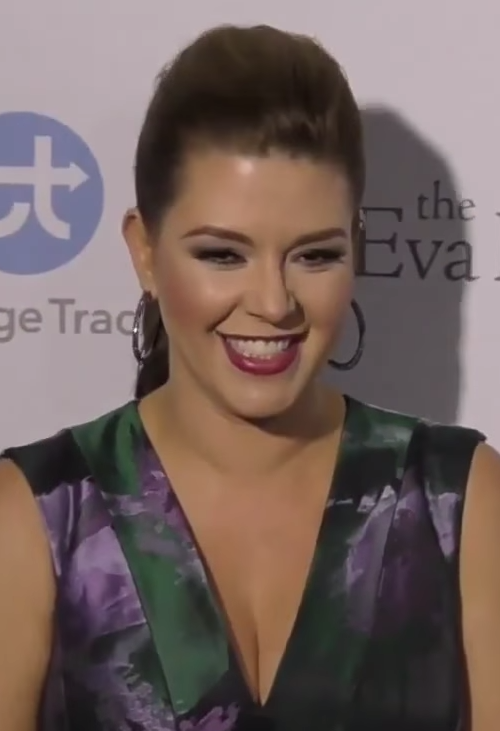
- Alicia Machado
- Date: 17 May 1996
- Presenters: Bob Goen; Marla Maples
- Entertainment: Michael Crawford
- Venue: Aladdin Theatre for the Performing Arts at Planet Hollywood Resorts and Casino, Las Vegas, Nevada, United States
- Broadcaster: CBS (KLAS-TV)
- Entrants: 79
- Placements: 10
- Withdrawals: Guam; Japan; Kenya; Mauritius; Nicaragua; Nigeria; Seychelles; United States Virgin Islands; Zambia
- Returns: Argentina; Belgium; Ghana; Honduras; Lebanon; Zimbabwe
- Winner: Alicia Machado; Venezuela
- Congeniality: Jodie McMullen (Australia)
- Best National Costume: Ilmira Shamsutdinova (Russia)
- Photogenic: Aileen Damiles (Philippines)

Miss Universe 1996 was the 45th Miss Universe pageant, held at the Aladdin Theatre for the Performing Arts in Las Vegas, Nevada, United States, on 17 May 1996. This was the final Miss Universe pageant produced by ITT Corp.

Alicia Machado of Venezuela was crowned by Chelsi Smith from the United States at the conclusion of the event. Seventy nine contestants competed in this edition. This is the second time that Las Vegas to host Miss Universe since 1991.

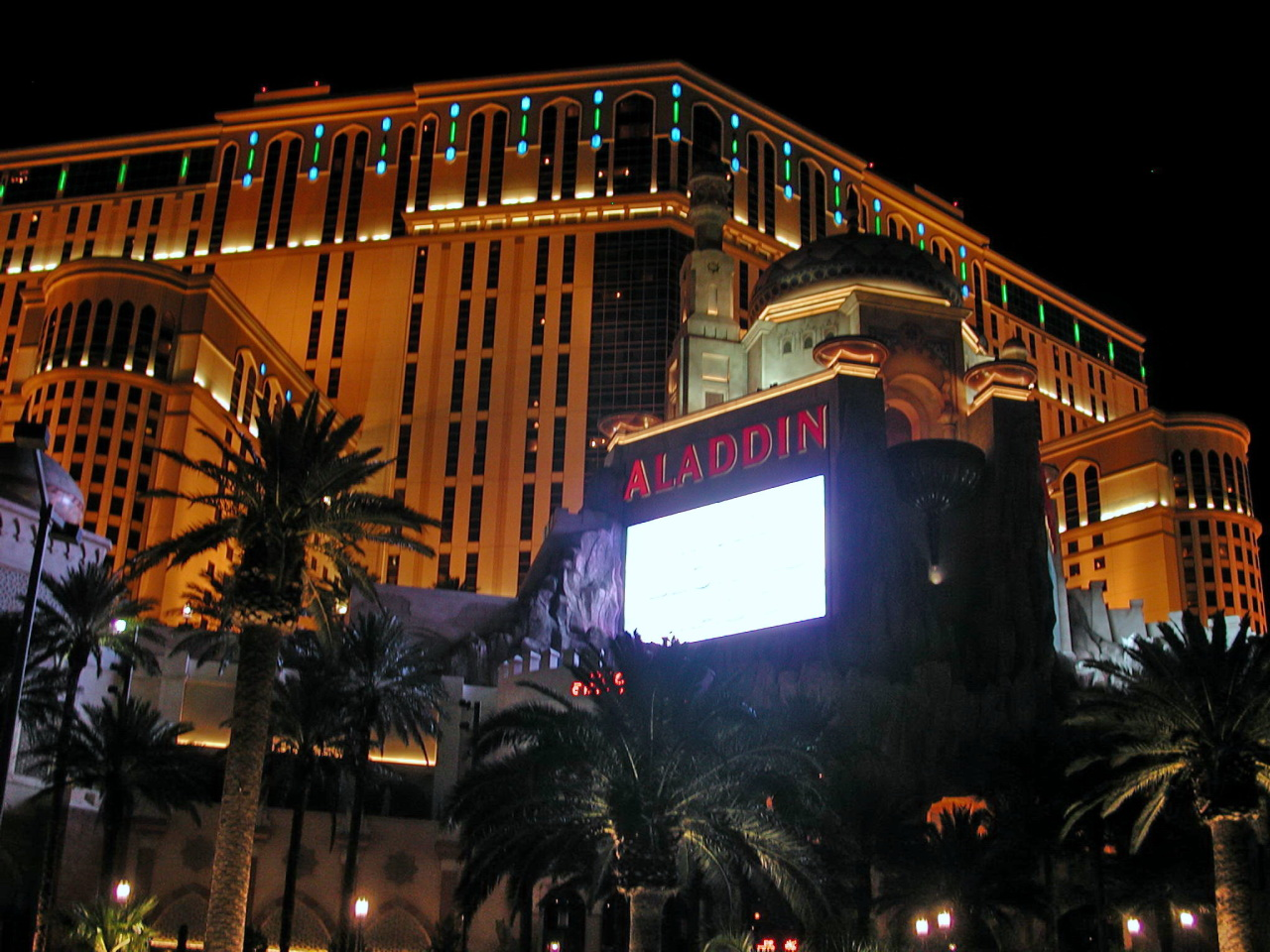
The New Aladdin before being rebranded as Planet Hollywood

== Results ==
=== Placements ===
Placement	Contestant
Miss Universe 1996	Venezuela – Alicia Machado
1st Runner-Up	Aruba – Taryn Mansell
2nd Runner-Up	Finland – Lola Odusoga
Top 6	Mexico – Vanessa Guzmán; Russia – Ilmira Shamsutdinova; United States – Ali Landry
Top 10	El Salvador – Milena Mayorga; India – Sandhya Chib; Peru – Natali Sacco; Sweden – Annika Duckmark

== Contestants ==
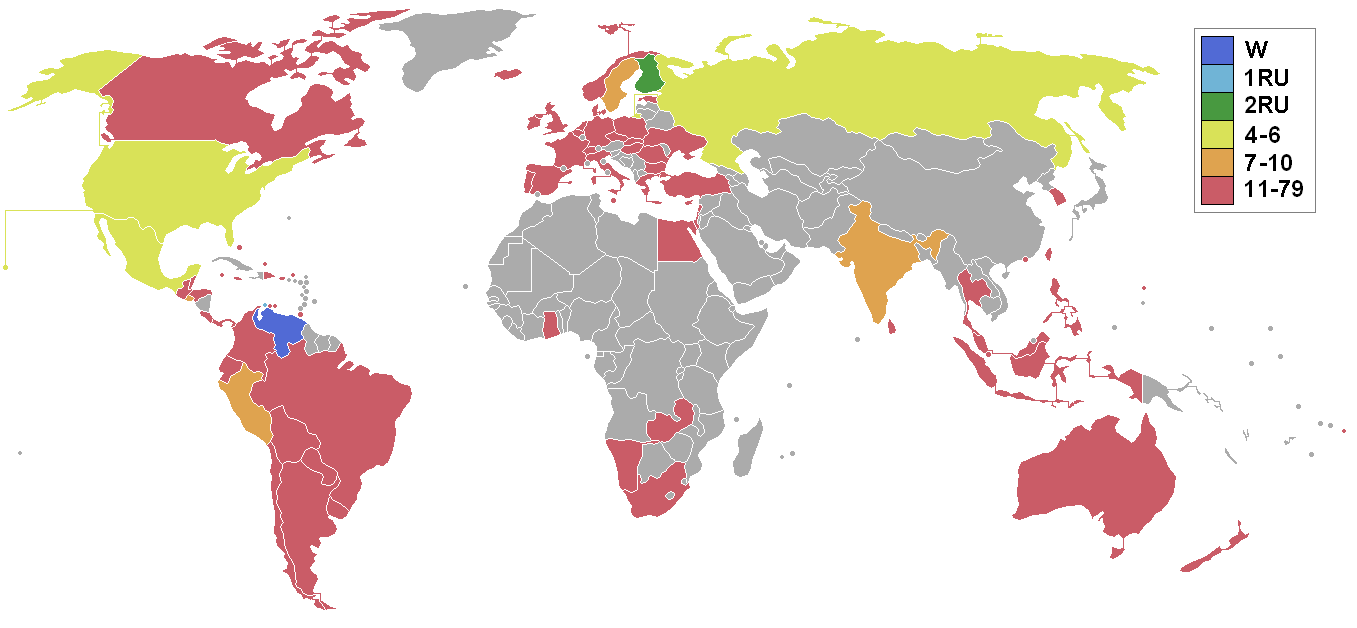
Miss Universe 1996 participating nations and results

Seventy-nine contestants competed for the title.

Country/Territory	Contestant	Age (Note: Ages at the time of the pageant)	Hometown
Argentina	Verónica Ledezma	19	Buenos Aires
Aruba	Taryn Mansell	19	Oranjestad
Australia	Jodie McMullen	22	Sydney
Bahamas	Michelle Rae Collie	20	Nassau
Belgium	Véronique De Kock	19	Antwerp
Belize	Ava Lovell	20	Belize City
Bolivia	Natalia Cronenbold	19	Santa Cruz de la Sierra
Bonaire	Jessy Viceisza	21	Kralendijk
Brazil	Maria Joana Parizotto	19	Francisco Beltrão
British Virgin Islands	Linette Smith	19	Road Town
Bulgaria	Maria Sinigerova	20	Sofia
Canada	Renette Cruz	25	Vancouver
Cayman Islands	Tasha Ebanks	22	George Town
Chile	Andrea L'Huillier	22	Santiago
Colombia	Lina María Gaviria	21	Villavicencio
Cook Islands	Victoria Keil	23	Rarotonga
Costa Rica	Dafne Zeledón	19	Limón
Curaçao	Vanessa Mambi	23	Willemstad
Cyprus	Froso Spyrou	20	Nicosia
Czech Republic	Renata Hornofová	21	Prague
Denmark	Anette Oldenborg	21	Copenhagen
Dominican Republic	Sandra Natasha Abreu	24	La Romana
Ecuador	Mónica Chalá	23	Quito
Egypt	Hadeel Abol-Naga	19	Cairo
El Salvador	Milena Mayorga	20	San Salvador
Estonia	Helen Mahmastol	18	Tallinn
Finland	Lola Odusoga	18	Turku
France	Laure Belleville	20	Lathuile
Germany	Miriam Ruppert	21	Taunusstein
Ghana	Pearl Amoah	19	Accra
Great Britain	Anita St. Rose	26	London
Greece	Nina Georgala	22	Athens
Guatemala	Karla Beteta	22	Guatemala City
Honduras	Yazmín Fiallos	19	Francisco Morazán
Hong Kong	Sofie Rahman	21	Hong Kong
Hungary	Andrea Deák	18	Budapest
Iceland	Hrafnhildur Hafsteinsdóttir	20	Reykjavik
India	Sandhya Chib	19	Bangalore
Indonesia	Alya Rohali	19	Jakarta
Ireland	Joanne Black	21	Cavan
Israel	Liraz Mesilaty	19	Beersheba
Italy	Anna Valle	20	Rome
Jamaica	Trudi-Ann Ferguson	21	Kingston
Lebanon	Julia Syriani	18	Beirut
Malaysia	Adeline Ong	23	Johor Bahru
Malta	Roseanne Farrugia	18	Lija
Mexico	Vanessa Guzmán	20	Ciudad Juárez
Namibia	Faghma Absolom	21	Windhoek
Netherlands	Marja de Graaf	19	Drenthe
New Zealand	Sarah Brady	20	Auckland
Northern Mariana Islands	Belvilyn Ada Tenorio	18	Garapan
Norway	Inger Lise Ebeltoft	19	Troms
Panama	Reyna Royo	25	Panama City
Paraguay	Marta Elizabeth Lovera	25	Asunción
Peru	Natali Sacco	21	Trujillo
Philippines	Aileen Damiles	20	Las Piñas
Poland	Monika Chróścicka-Wnętrzak	20	Słupsk
Portugal	Rita Carvalho	19	Bragança
Puerto Rico	Sarybel Velilla	19	Toa Alta
Romania	Roberta Anastase	20	Prahova
Russia	Ilmira Shamsutdinova	20	Saratov
Singapore	Angeline Putt	22	Singapore
Slovakia	Iveta Jankulárová	18	Bratislava
South Africa	Carol Becker	23	Gauteng
South Korea	Kim Yoon-jung	22	Seoul
Spain	María José Suárez	20	Seville
Sri Lanka	Shivanthini Dharmasiri	25	Colombo
Sweden	Annika Duckmark	24	Borås
Switzerland	Stéphanie Berger	18	Zürich
Taiwan	Chen Hsiao-Fen	23	Taipei
Thailand	Nirachala Kumya	19	Chiang Mai
Trinidad and Tobago	Michelle Kahn	23	Princes Town
Turkey	Serpil Sevilay Öztürk	19	Ankara
Turks and Caicos Islands	Shaneika Lightbourne	23	Grand Turk
Ukraine	Irina Borisova	18	Kyiv
United States	Ali Landry	22	Breaux Bridge
Uruguay	Adriana Sandra Maidana	20	Maldonado
Venezuela	Alicia Machado	19	Maracay
Zimbabwe	Langa Sibanda	26	Harare
