= Gabriella Lomm Mann =

Swedish fashion model (born 1995)

- Born: Gabriella Lomm; 8 November 1995 (age 31); Stockholm, Sweden
- Education: Stockholm University (Bachelor in Finance)
- Occupations: Model, fashion model, auditor
- Height: 1.70 m (5 ft 7 in)
- Beauty pageant titleholder
- Title: Miss Sweden 2020
- Years active: 2005–present
- Hair color: Blonde
- Eye color: Blue
- Major competitions: Miss Earth 2020 (Unplaced); Miss World 2021 (Unplaced)

Gabriella Lomm Mann (born 8 November 1995), also known as Gabriella Mann, is a Swedish fashion model, auditor and beauty pageant titleholder who was crowned Miss Earth Sweden 2020. In 2021, she was selected to represent Sweden in the Miss World 2021 pageant to be held on the José Miguel Agrelot Coliseum in San Juan, Puerto Rico.

== Background and education ==
She was born on 8 November 1995 in Stockholm, Sweden to Agneta Mann. Gabriella studied at Adolf Fredriks Elementary School, Norral Real High School and she graduated with a Bachelor in Business Administration in Finance from Stockholm University.

== Career ==
Lomm Mann started modelling in 2005. She has taken part in different runways such as New York fashion week, Paris Fashion Week. In 2020, Lomm Mann represented Sweden at Miss Earth 2020.
