= Kerstin Ringberg =

Swedish model

- Born: March 27, 1925
- Died: July 24, 2001 (aged 76)
- Beauty pageant titleholder
- Title: Miss Sweden 1949

Kerstin Ringberg (March 27, 1925 – July 24, 2001) was a Swedish model who became the first winner of the Miss Sweden pageant in 1949.
