= Valerie Aflalo =

Swedish model, beauty queen and fashion designer

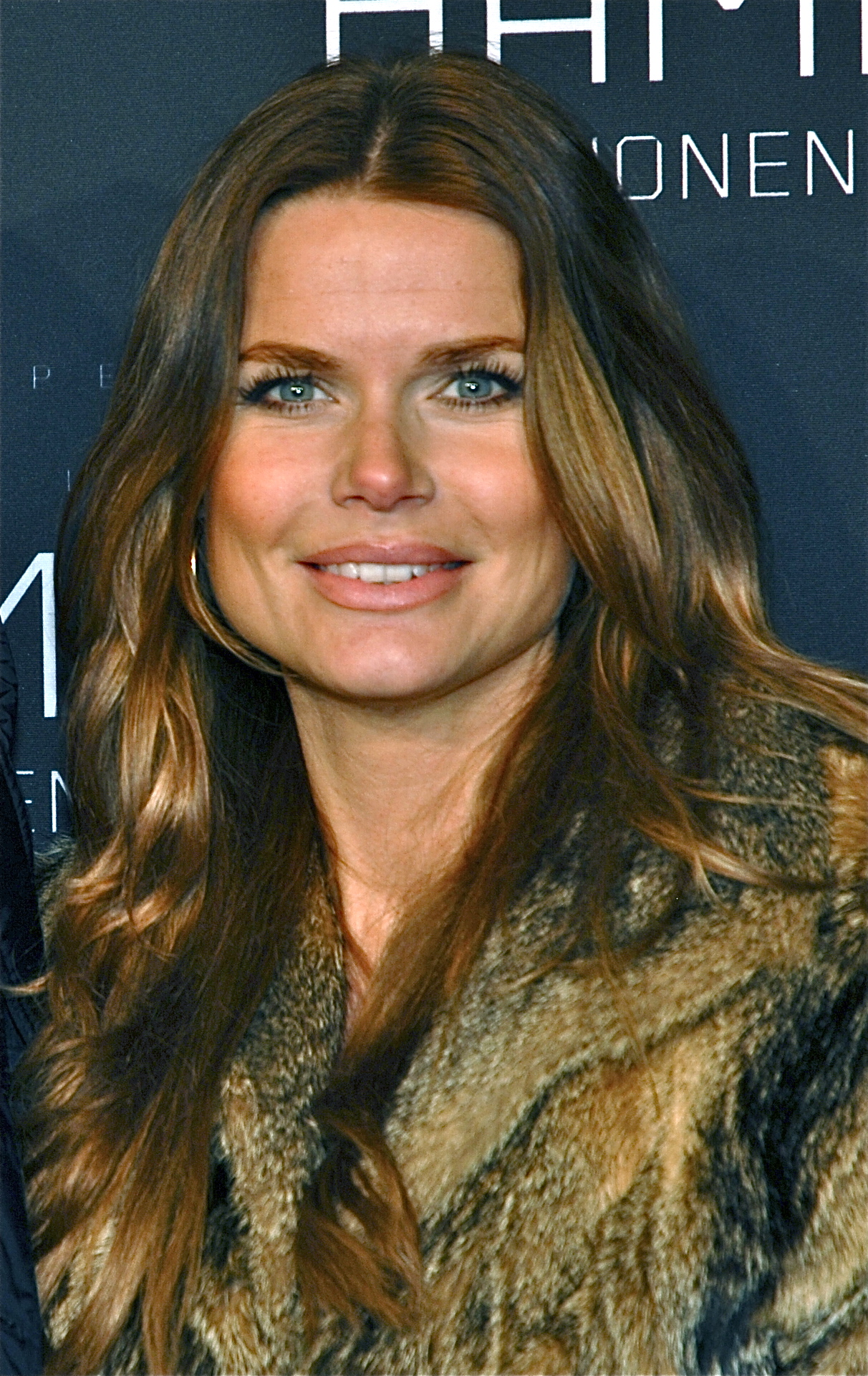
- Aflalo in 2012
- Born: Anne Valerie Aflalo; 7 October 1976 (age 49); Malmö, Sweden
- Beauty pageant titleholder
- Title: Miss Sweden (2000)
- Eye color: Blue

Anne Valerie Aflalo (born 7 October 1976 in Malmö) is a Swedish model, fashion designer and beauty pageant titleholder. Aflalo is perhaps most known for being crowned Miss Sweden 2000 and representing her country at Miss Universe 2000 in Nicosia, Cyprus. Since 2005, she has designed clothing for her own label "Valerie." Aflalo was also the host of a morning radio talkshow on NRJ.

Valerie Aflalo is the daughter of Pierre Maurice Aflalo and Ann-Christine Aflalo. She studied at Borgarskolan in Malmö during 1995.
