= Ida Ovmar =

Swedish model (born 1995)

Ida Sharise Ovmar
- Born: Ida Ovmar; July 17, 1995 (age 31); Luleå, Sweden
- Height: 1.73 m (5 ft 8 in)
- Beauty pageant titleholder
- Title: Miss Continents 2016; Miss Universe Sweden 2016; Miss bride of Sweden 2014; Miss Exclusive 2014; Miss Supranational 2014; Best body Supranational 2014
- Hair color: Blonde
- Eye color: Blue
- Major competitions: Miss Bride Of Sweden; Miss Exclusive 2014 (1st Runner-up); Miss Supranational 2014 (Top 20); Miss Continents 2016 (Winner); Miss Universe Sweden 2016 (Winner); Miss Universe 2016 (Unplaced)

Ida Ovmar (born July 17, 1995) is a Swedish model and beauty pageant titleholder who won Miss Universe Sweden 2016 and represented Sweden at Miss Universe 2016.

Ovmar started her pageant career at the age of seventeen when she entered the stage of Miss World Sweden. She won Miss Bride of Sweden and traveled to China. The same year, 2014 she represented Sweden in Miss Supranational in Poland where she was in the top 20 and won the best body title.

During Miss Exclusive she was crowned as 1st runner-up. One year later she decided to compete for the first time in America, Miss Continents were held in Las Vegas June 2016. Ida Ovmar became the first woman outside the US to win the whole competition.

== Personal life ==
Ovmar works as a model, and is ethnically Sami. She was born just outside Luleå but lives in Stockholm.

In high school she studied society and behaviorism.

== Pageantry ==
=== Miss Supranational 2014 ===
On 5 December 2014 Ovmar represented Sweden at Miss Supranational 2014 in Poland.

=== Miss Continents 2016 ===
She was the winner of Miss Continents 2016, she became the first contestant from outside the US to win the title.

=== Miss Universe Sweden 2016 ===
On 28 August 2016 Ovmar was crowned Miss Universe Sweden 2016 at Café Opera in Stockholm. She represented Sweden at Miss Universe 2016 in Manila, Philippines.

=== Miss Universe 2016 ===
Ovmar represented Sweden at Miss Universe 2016 but Unplaced.

== Awards ==
Awards and achievements
Preceded by Paulina Brodd	Miss Universe Sweden; 2016	Succeeded by Frida Fornander
