= Annika Duckmark =

Swedish television presenter (born 1971)

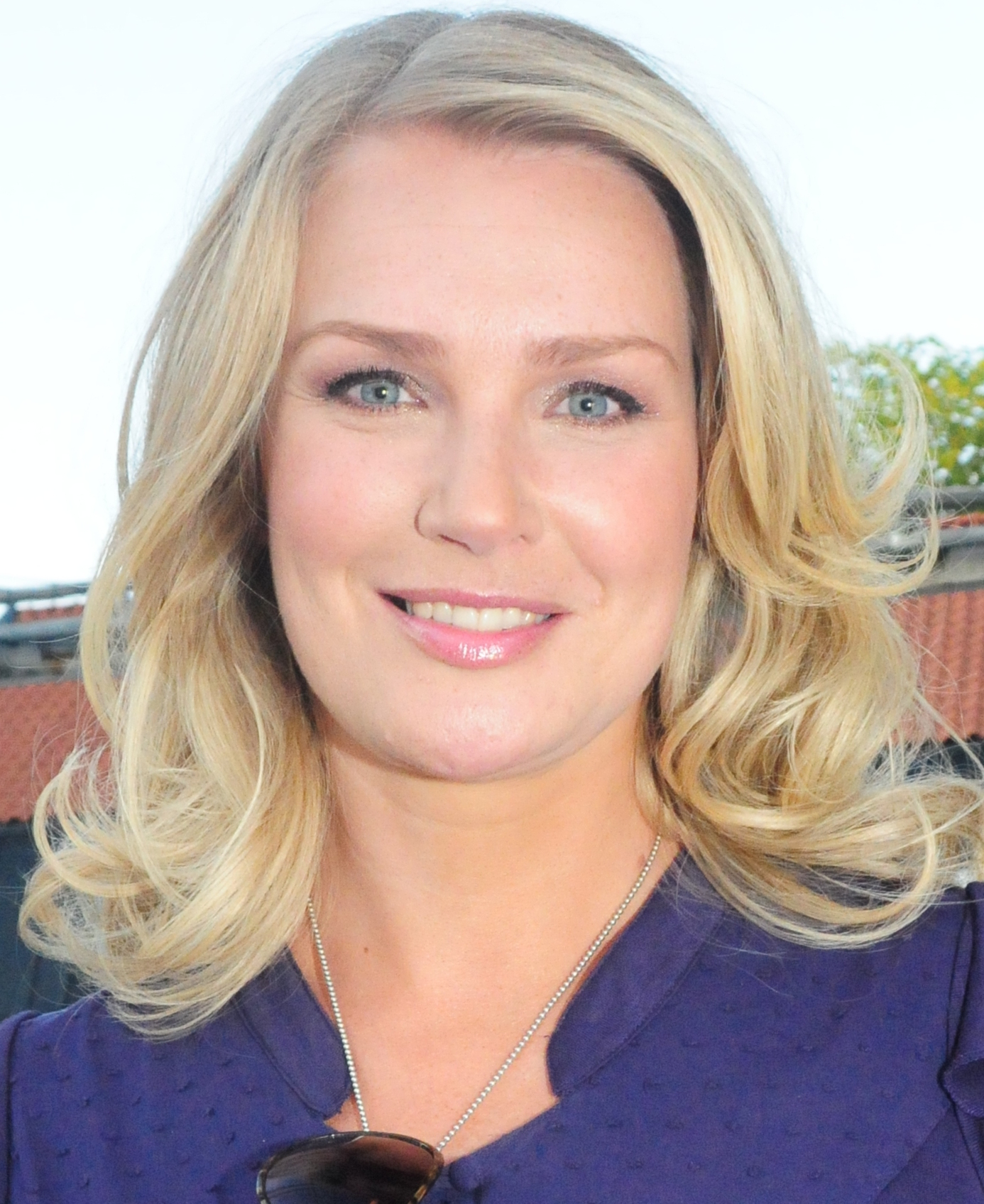
- Born: 17 September 1971 (age 55); Borås, Västergötland, Sweden
- Occupation: television presenter
- Beauty pageant titleholder
- Title: Miss Sweden 1996

Annika Duckmark (born 17 September 1971) is a Swedish television presenter and beauty pageant titleholder. She was crowned as Miss Sweden in 1996.

Duckmark represented Sweden at the Miss Universe 1996 where she was ranked 4th overall during the preliminary competition. This ranking enabled her to advance as one of the top 10 semifinalists, ultimately placing 10th overall during the semifinals.

In 1998, Duckmark presented the movie-review show ”Wide screen” on TV1000. Duckmark presented the Lotto draw on TV4 each week from 2000 to 2010.

== Personal life ==
Duckmark was involved with the Swedish former football player Tomas Brolin; they met in late 2000, and stayed together until 2006.
