= Johanna Lind =

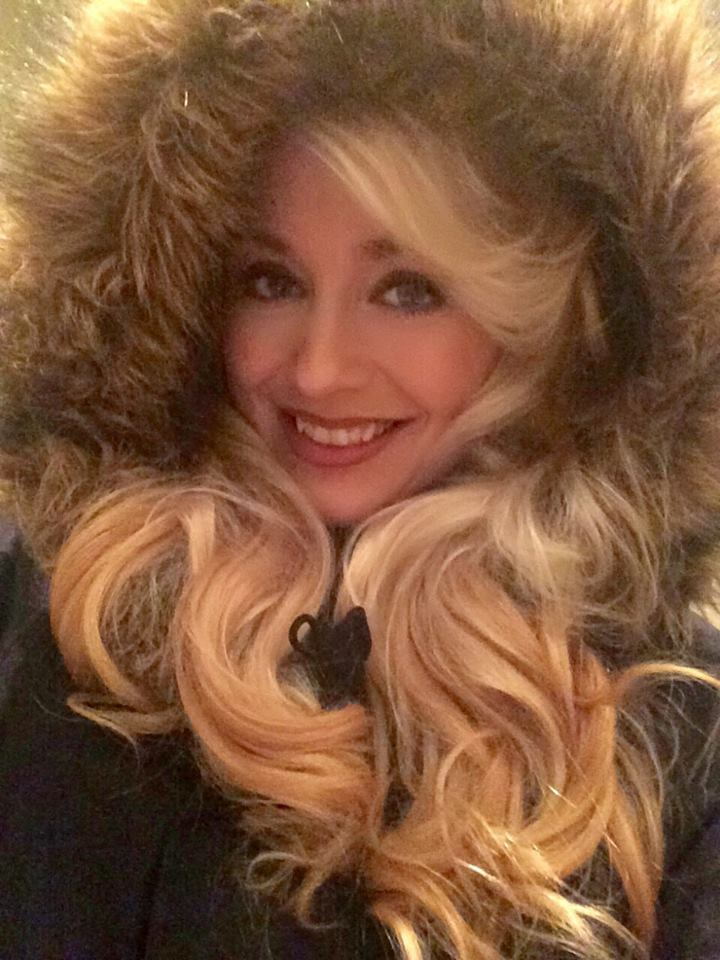
- Lind in 2016

Background information
- Also known as: Miss Sweden (1993)
- Born: Johanna Karin Lind; 13 October 1971 (age 54)
- Origin: Sweden

Johanna Karin Lind Bagge (born 13 October 1971) is a Swedish artist and beauty pageant titleholder who won Miss Sweden 1993 and represented her country at Miss Universe where she was placed 16th overall during the preliminary. She won over the 1st runner-up and later Playboy model Victoria Silvstedt.

During her tenure as Miss Sweden, Lind was also featured in Swedish media for her involvement in the Mae West Centenary celebration going on there.

In August 2018, Lind married music producer Anders Bagge.
