= Malou Hansson =

Swedish actress, model and beauty pageant titleholder (born 1983)

- Born: 1983 (age 42–43); Järfälla, Sweden
- Occupation: Actress/Model
- Title: Miss Sweden
- Term: 2002
- Predecessor: Malin Olsson
- Successor: Helena Stenbäck

Malou Hansson (born 1983 in Järfälla, Uppland, Sweden) is a Swedish actress, model and beauty pageant titleholder. She served as Miss Sweden 2002. She was the first woman with black African ancestry to hold this beauty pageant title.

Hansson, competing as "Miss Uppland", was suggested as a potential candidate for the Miss Universe pageant by a celebrity panel, and the viewers selected her as the winner via a telephone poll. She served as Sweden's representative in the Miss Universe 2002 pageant but she did not place in the top 10.

Hansson, while the first woman of African ancestry to win the crown, was not the first woman of African ancestry to compete for the title of Miss Sweden. Other black Miss Sweden-contestants during the years have included such as Jessica Folcker (2nd R-UP 1993), Ida Sofia Manneh (1st R-UP 2001) and her own sister Nanna Hansson in 2001.

== Film career ==
Since her time as Miss Sweden ended, Hansson has appeared in several Swedish films in small roles. These include Stockholm Boogie (2005), Blodsbröder (2005), and Sökarna: Återkomsten (2006). In 2007 Hansson performed her first leading movie role as "Nathalie" in the Swedish movie Gangster, alongside actors Kjell Bergqvist and Mikael Persbrandt.
