= Helena Stenbäck =

Swedish model

Helena Stenbäck (born 1979) is a Swedish model and beauty pageant titleholder won the Miss Sweden 2003 and represented the country in Miss Universe but did not make the top 15 cut. She is from Piteå and was educated in Umeå where she completed a Master in Economics. Helena became a full favorite of jury after her discussion about war in Iraq.
