= Jessica Olérs =

Swedish beauty pageant contestant (born 1978)

Jessica Patricia Marie Olérs (born in 1978 in Borlänge, Sweden) is a Swedish beauty pageant titleholder who won Miss Sweden and her country's representative at the Miss Universe 1998 pageant. She has studied marketing in Stockholm and New York City. Nowadays she is employed as marketing assistant at a gym in Stockholm, Sweden.

== Personal life ==
Olérs married in 2016.
