= Miss Universe 2011 =

60th anniversary of the Miss Universe pageant

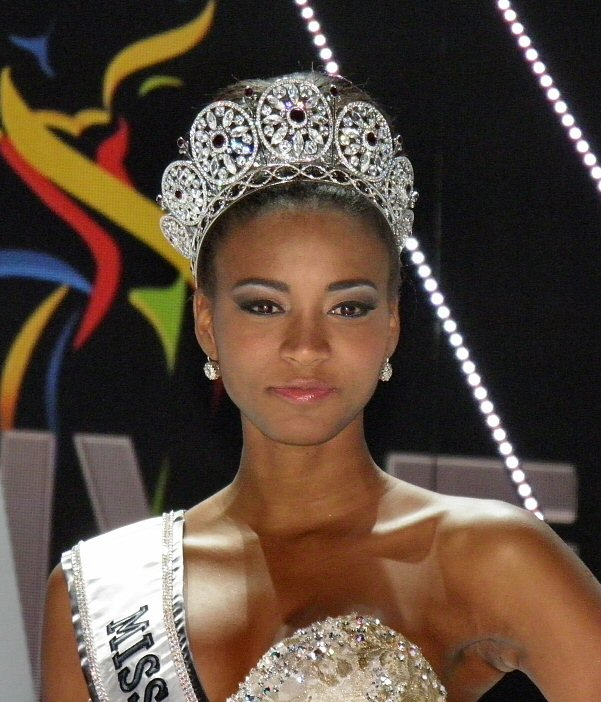
- Leila Lopes
- Date: 12 September 2011
- Presenters: Andy Cohen; Natalie Morales; Jeannie Mai; Shandi Finnessey
- Entertainment: Bebel Gilberto; Claudia Leitte
- Venue: Credicard Hall, São Paulo, Brazil
- Broadcaster: International: NBC; Telemundo; Official broadcaster:Band (Band São Paulo)
- Entrants: 89
- Placements: 16
- Withdrawals: Norway; Zambia
- Returns: Cayman Islands; Chile; Estonia; Montenegro; Portugal; Saint Lucia; Turks and Caicos Islands; Vietnam
- Winner: Leila Lopes; Angola
- Congeniality: Nikolina Lončar, Montenegro
- Best National Costume: Sheldry Sáez, Panama
- Photogenic: Ronnia Fornstedt, Sweden

Miss Universe 2011 was the 60th Miss Universe pageant, held at the Credicard Hall in São Paulo, Brazil, on 12 September 2011.

At the end of the event, Ximena Navarrete of Mexico crowned Leila Lopes of Angola as Miss Universe 2011, marking the country's first win at the pageant.

Contestants from eighty-nine countries and territories competed in this year's pageant, surpassing the previous 86 contestants at Miss Universe 2006. The pageant was hosted by Andy Cohen and Natalie Morales, with commentary and analysis by Jeannie Mai and Shandi Finnessey. Brazilian singer-songwriter Bebel Gilberto and Brazilian pop singer Claudia Leitte were the performers.

== Background ==
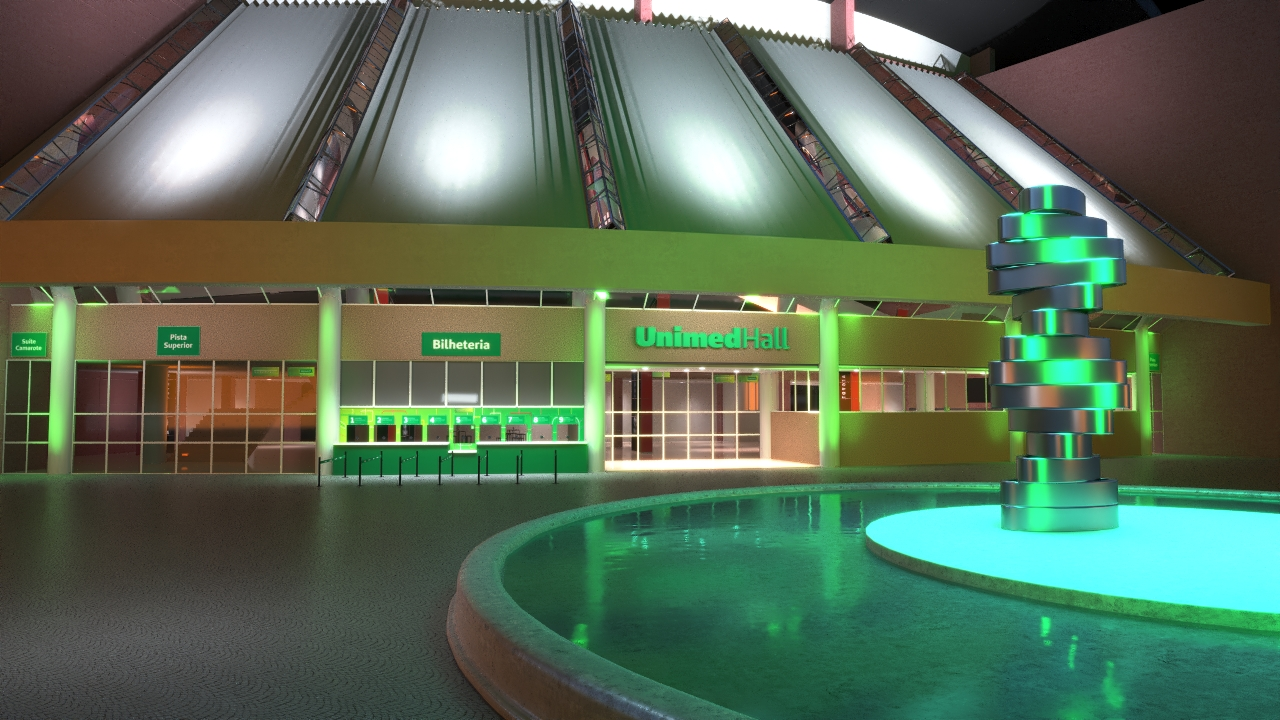
The venue, Credicard Hall

=== Location and date ===
On 16 December 2010, Donald Trump, owner of the Miss Universe Organization, and Paula Shugart, president of the Miss Universe Organization, announced that the 60th anniversary of the competition will take place in São Paulo, Brazil on 12 September 2011. This came months after Trump negotiated with the media conglomerate Grupo Bandeirantes de Comunicação to host the pageant in São Paulo. According to Joao Carlos Saad, president of Grupo Bandeirantes, the network was pleased that they have reached an agreement with Miss Universe to host the pageant in São Paulo, Brazil. The event aired on NBC in the United States, with a Spanish simulcast on Telemundo.

=== Selection of participants ===
Contestants from eighty-nine countries and territories were selected to compete in the competition. Six of these contestants were appointees to their positions after being a runner-up of their national pageant or being selected through a casting process, while three were selected to replace the original dethroned winner.

==== Replacements ====
Evalina van Putten replaced Miss Curaçao 2011,Monifa Jansen as she did not meet the age requirements. Jansen competed at Miss Universe 2012. Mayra Aldana, the first runner-up of Nuestra Belleza El Salvador 2011, replaced Alejandra Ochoa, Nuestra Belleza Universo 2011, who had a chronic respiratory illness. Mai Phương Thúy, Miss Vietnam 2006, was to represent Vietnam at Miss Universe, but did not for personal reasons. The Ministry of Culture of Vietnam was granted permission to appoint Vũ Thị Hoàng My, who was the first runner-up of Miss Vietnam 2010, as their representative.

==== Returns and withdrawals ====
The 2011 edition saw the returns of the Cayman Islands, Chile, Estonia, Montenegro, Portugal, Saint Lucia, Turks and Caicos Islands, and Vietnam. Portugal last competed in 2002, Chile last competed in 2006, Saint Lucia last competed in 2007, Turks and Caicos last competed in 2008, while the others last competed in 2009. Norway and Zambia withdrew. Sara Nicole Andersen of Norway was crowned ten days after the arrival of contestants in São Paulo. Due to this, Andersen withdrew from the competition. However, Andersen competed in the pageant the following year. Zambia withdrew after its respective organization failed to hold a national competition or appoint a contestant.

Lisa Morgan of Zimbabwe was not allowed to compete after the Miss Universe Organization denied her participation and she went on to compete in Miss International 2011 held in Chengdu, China instead.

== Results ==
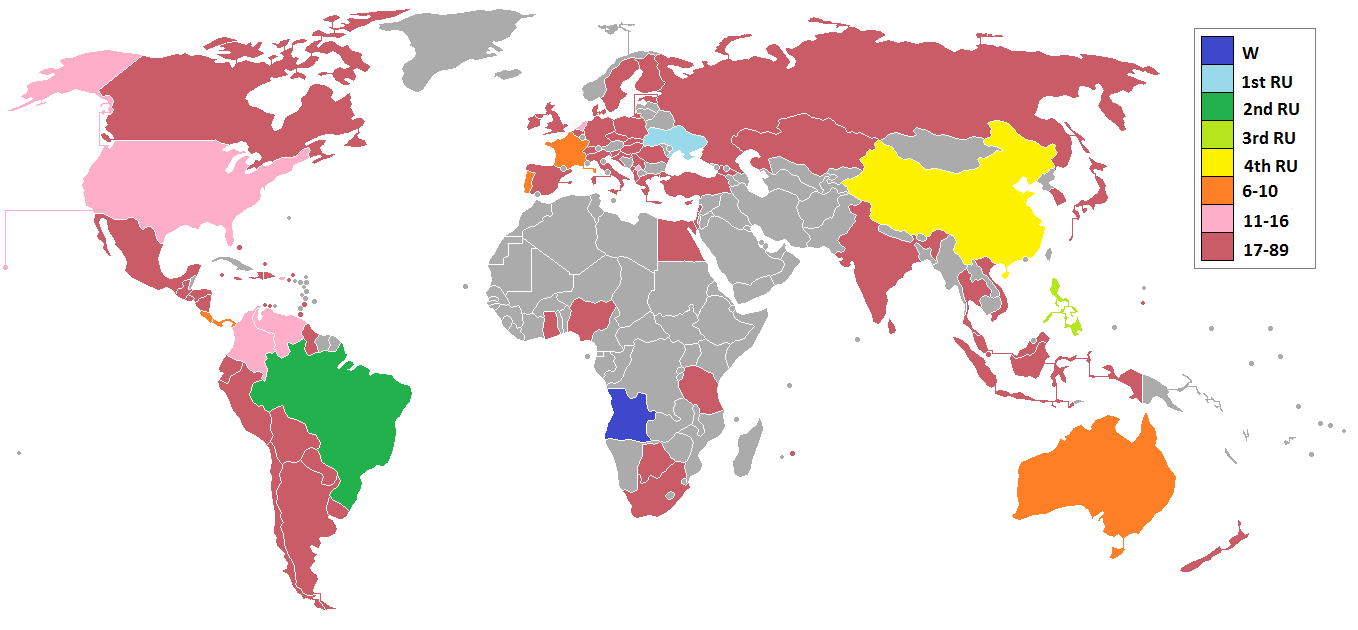
Participating countries and territories.

=== Placements ===
Placement	Contestant
Miss Universe 2011	Angola – Leila Lopes
1st Runner-Up	Ukraine – Olesya Stefanko
2nd Runner-Up	Brazil – Priscila Machado
3rd Runner-Up	Philippines – Shamcey Supsup
4th Runner-Up	China – Zilin Lou
Top 10	Australia – Scherri-Lee Biggs; Costa Rica – Johanna Solano; France – Laury Thilleman; Panama – Sheldry Sáez; Portugal – Laura Gonçalves ☆
Top 16	Colombia – Catalina Robayo; Kosovo – Afërdita Dreshaj; Netherlands – Kelly Weekers; Puerto Rico – Viviana Ortiz; United States – Alyssa Campanella; Venezuela – Vanessa Gonçalves

☆ - Voted into the Top 16 by viewers

=== Special awards ===
Award	Contestant
Miss Congeniality	Montenegro – Nikolina Lončar
Miss Photogenic	Sweden – Ronnia Fornstedt
Best National Costume	Winner: Panama – Sheldry Sáez; Top 10 (in order): Mexico – Karin Ontiveros; Thailand – Chanyasorn Sakornchan; Venezuela – Vanessa Gonçalves; Curacao – Evalina van Putten; Trinidad and Tobago – Gabrielle Walcott; Tanzania – Nelly Kamwelu; Bolivia – Olivia Pinheiro; Nigeria – Sophie Gemal; Japan – Maria Kamiyama

== Pageant ==
=== Format ===
The Miss Universe Organization introduced several specific changes to the format for this edition. The results of the preliminary competition— which consisted of the swimsuit and evening gown competition, and the closed-door interview, determined the fifteen semifinalists. For the first time in its sixty-year history, the organization will implement a pre-pageant fan vote where fans are able to vote for their favorite contestant to automatically advance to the semifinals. This changes the number of semifinalists from fifteen to sixteen. Aside from that, viewers can also rank each contestant during the live pageant.

The sixteen semifinalists competed in the swimsuit competition and were narrowed down to ten afterward. The ten semifinalists competed in the evening gown competition and were narrowed down to five afterward. The five finalists competed in the question and answer round and the final look. During the telecast, viewers are able to see on-screen a fan-voting meter which instantly reveals the scores of the contestants from the real-time voting.

=== Selection committee ===
==== Preliminary competition ====
- BJ Coleman – President and CEO of Coleman Entertainment Group
- Francesca Romana Diana – Italian jewelry designer
- Ana Paula Junqueira – President of the League of Women Voters and United Nations Secretary-General in Brazil
- Scott Lazerson – Philanthropist and former head of the Larry King Foundation
- Matheus Mazzafera – Stylist and reality television show host
- Jimmy Nguyen – Entertainment and new media lawyer, spokesperson for equal rights and diversity
- Lara Spotts – Vice-President of East Coast Development for the Bravo Network

==== Final telecast ====
- Hélio Castroneves – Brazilian auto racing driver and three-time Indianapolis 500 champion
- Connie Chung – American journalist and television news broadcaster
- Isabeli Fontana – Brazilian supermodel
- Vivica A. Fox – American actress and television producer
- Adrienne Maloof-Nassif – American businesswoman and television personality
- Lea Salonga – Filipina singer and actress
- Amelia Vega – Miss Universe 2003 from the Dominican Republic

== Contestants ==
Eighty-nine contestants competed for the title.

Country/Territory	Contestant	Age (Note: Ages at the time of the pageant)	Hometown
Albania	Xhesika Berberi	20	Tirana
Angola	Leila Lopes	25	Benguela
Argentina	Natalia Rodríguez	25	Buenos Aires
Aruba	Gillain Berry	24	Oranjestad
Australia	Scherri Biggs	21	Perth
Bahamas	Anastagia Pierre	22	Nassau
Belgium	Justine de Jonckheere	19	Wevelgem
Bolivia	Olivia Pinheiro	27	Santa Cruz
Botswana	Larona Kgabo	25	Gaborone
Brazil	Priscila Machado	25	Canoas
British Virgin Islands	Sheroma Hodge	26	Tortola
Canada	Chelsae Durocher	20	Tecumseh
Cayman Islands	Cristin Alexander	24	George Town
Chile	Vanessa Ceruti	25	Santiago
China	Zilin Luo	24	Shanghai
Colombia	Catalina Robayo	22	Cali
Costa Rica	Johanna Solano	20	Escazu
Croatia	Natalija Prica	22	Zagreb
Curaçao	Evalina van Putten	19	Willemstad
Cyprus	Andriani Karantoni	18	Larnaca
Czech Republic	Jitka Nováčková	19	České Budějovice
Denmark	Sandra Amer	21	Copenhagen
Dominican Republic	Dalia Fernández	21	Santiago de los Caballeros
Ecuador	Claudia Schiess	21	Santa Cruz
Egypt	Sara El-Khouly	23	Alexandria
El Salvador	Mayra Aldana	25	San Salvador
Estonia	Madli Vilsar	20	Kuressaare
Finland	Pia Pakarinen	20	Vantaa
France	Laury Thilleman	20	Brest
Georgia	Eka Gurtskaia	25	Tbilisi
Germany	Valeria Bystritskaia	25	Karlsruhe
Ghana	Yayra Nego	26	Accra
Great Britain	Chloe-Beth Morgan	25	Cwmbran
Greece	Iliana Papageorgiou	23	Patras
Guam	Shayna Afaisen	24	Inalåhan
Guatemala	Alejandra Barillas	25	Zacapa
Guyana	Kara Lord	23	Georgetown
Haiti	Anedie Azael	22	Port-au-Prince
Honduras	Keylin Gómez	23	Cortés
Hungary	Betta Lipcsei	23	Szarvas
India	Vasuki Sunkavalli	27	Hyderabad
Indonesia	Nadine Alexandra	20	Jakarta
Ireland	Aoife Hannon	19	Listowel
Israel	Kim Edri	19	Sderot
Italy	Elisa Torrini	22	Rome
Jamaica	Shakira Martin	25	Kingston
Japan	Maria Kamiyama	24	Tokyo
Kazakhstan	Valeriya Aleinikova	22	Almaty
Kosovo	Afërdita Dreshaj	25	Pristina
Lebanon	Yara Khoury Mikhael	19	Beirut
Malaysia	Deborah Priya Henry	26	Kuala Lumpur
Mauritius	Laetitia Darche	20	Flic-en-Flac
Mexico	Karin Ontiveros	23	Amatitán
Montenegro	Nikolina Lončar	18	Pljevlja
Netherlands	Kelly Weekers	22	Maastricht
New Zealand	Priyani Puketapu	20	Wellington
Nicaragua	Adriana Dorn	24	Managua
Nigeria	Sophie Gemal	22	Abuja
Panama	Sheldry Sáez	19	Chitré
Paraguay	Alba Riquelme	20	Asunción
Peru	Natalie Vértiz	19	Lima
Philippines	Shamcey Supsup	25	General Santos
Poland	Rozalia Mancewicz	24	Białystok
Portugal	Laura Gonçalves	22	Lisbon
Puerto Rico	Viviana Ortiz	25	Corozal
Romania	Larisa Popa	24	Slatina
Russia	Natalia Gantimurova	20	Moscow
Saint Lucia	Joy-Ann Biscette	25	Castries
Serbia	Anja Šaranović	21	Belgrade
Singapore	Valerie Lim	26	Singapore
Slovakia	Dagmar Kolesárová	20	Revúca
Slovenia	Ema Jagodič	21	Ljubljana
South Africa	Bokang Montjane	25	Johannesburg
South Korea	Sora Jung	20	Seoul
Spain	Paula Guilló	22	Elche
Sri Lanka	Stephanie Siriwardhana	23	Colombo
Sweden	Ronnia Fornstedt	20	Södertälje
Switzerland	Kerstin Cook	22	Kriens
Tanzania	Nelly Kamwelu	19	Dar Es Salaam
Thailand	Chanyasorn Sakornchan	21	Chonburi
Trinidad and Tobago	Gabrielle Walcott	27	Port of Spain
Turkey	Melisa Aslı Pamuk	20	Istanbul
Turks and Caicos Islands	Easher Parker	19	Providenciales
Ukraine	Olesya Stefanko	23	Odesa
United States	Alyssa Campanella	21	Los Angeles
United States Virgin Islands	Alexandrya Evans	25	Saint Croix
Uruguay	Fernanda Semino	18	Montevideo
Venezuela	Vanessa Gonçalves	25	Caracas
Vietnam	Hoàng My Vũ	20	Đồng Nai
