= Katarina Konow =

Swedish model and beauty queen

Katarina Konow is a Swedish model and beauty pageant. Born in Gnosjö, Jönköping County, she was the beauty pageant titleholder who placed 1-runner up in Miss Universe Sweden in 2012, and represented Sweden in Miss International 2012 in Japan. Konow now holds the title Miss International Sweden 2012.
