= Katarina Wigander =

Swedish model

Katarina Agnes Wigander
- Born: 1983 (age 42–43); Lerum, Västergötland, Sweden

Katarina Agnes Wigander (born 1983 in Lerum, Västergötland) is a Swedish model and beauty pageant titleholder who was crowned Miss Sweden 2004 and represented her country at Miss Universe 2004.

Her victory in the beauty pageant was controversial in her home country, as she was crowned by Moore Magazine, a magazine for men that publishes pictures for other Swedish "men's" magazines, such as Slitz. In 2004, Moore Magazine and Bingo Rimér managed to take over the crowning after the old arrangers had stopped holding the pageant after 2003. Wigander was the only Miss Sweden to be crowned under this regime, as there was no 2005 Miss Sweden, and "New Miss Sweden" was staged in 2006. For this reason, her title is sometimes said to be "unofficial".
