= Alexandra Friberg =

Swedish model and beauty queen

- Born: Sarah Alexandra Linnea Friberg; 1994 (age 31–32); Stockholm, Sweden
- Height: 1.80 m (5 ft 11 in)
- Beauty pageant titleholder
- Title: Miss Sweden 2013
- Hair color: Blonde
- Eye color: Blue
- Major competitions: Miss Beauty of The World 2013 (Winner); Miss Sweden 2013 (Winner); Miss Universe 2013

Alexandra Friberg (born 1994) is a Swedish model and beauty pageant titleholder who was crowned Miss Universe Sweden 2013 on 30 August 2013. Friberg represented Sweden at the Miss Universe 2013 in Moscow.

== Early life ==
Alexandra is a Jewelry Designer, Artist, Designer in Stockholm.

== Miss Sweden 2013 ==
Alexandra Friberg was crowned Miss Universe Sweden 2013 at Club Ambassadeur Stockholm. She then went on to represent Sweden at Miss Universe 2013.

== Other Pageants ==
Friberg was crowned Miss Beauty of The World in 2013, the pageant was held in Kyrgyzstan.

Awards and achievements
| Preceded by Hanni Beronius | Miss Universe Sweden; 2013 | Succeeded by Camilla Hansson |
