= Hanni Beronius =

Swedish beauty queen (born 1990)

- Born: Hanni Maryam Johanna Elisabeth Beronius; 21 January 1990 (age 36); Kungsbacka, Sweden
- Height: 1.74 m (5 ft 8 1/2 in)
- Beauty pageant titleholder
- Title: Miss Universe Sweden
- Hair color: Dark blond
- Eye color: Dark brown
- Major competition: Miss Universe Sweden

Hanni Beronius (born 21 January 1990) is a Swedish beauty queen who was crowned Miss Universe Sweden in 2012. Beronius represented Sweden in Miss Universe 2012 in Las Vegas. Her father is Swedish and her mother was brought up in Iran by a Swedish mother and Persian father. Beronius lives in Gothenburg, Sweden. She is the first Swedish contestant at Miss Universe to be of Persian descent. In 2010, Beronius filed a complaint to the police about people taking her photos and using them to create fake Facebook accounts, which led to Beronius being harassed by people via phonecalls and mobile texts messages. On 28 November 2012, Beronius appeared as the covergirl and in an editorial on the Washington magazine The Georgetowner.

Awards and achievements
Preceded by Ronnia Fornstedt	Miss Universe Sweden; 2012	Succeeded by Alexandra Friberg
