= Cécilia Rodhe =

Swedish beauty pageant titleholder (born 1961)

- Born: Cécilia Catharina Björnsdotter Rodhe; 1 September 1961 (age 65); Gothenburg, Sweden
- Height: 5 ft 9 in (1.75 m)
- Beauty pageant titleholder
- Title: Miss Sweden 1978
- Hair color: Blonde
- Eye color: Green
- Major competitions: Miss Sweden 1978 (winner); Miss Universe 1978 (4th runner-up)

Cécilia Catharina Björnsdotter Rodhe (surname sometimes spelled Rhode; formerly Rhodes-Noah; born 1 September 1961) is a Swedish beauty pageant titleholder who won Miss Sweden 1978. She competed in the Miss Universe 1978 pageant, held in Mexico, 24 July. In the Miss Universe pageant, she finished fifth place. She is currently a sculptor.

== Personal life ==
By her former marriage to French tennis player Yannick Noah, she has two children, Joakim and Yélena. The 6'11" Joakim played college basketball for the 2006 and 2007 NCAA national champions, the University of Florida Gators, and later played in the National Basketball Association (NBA) mostly with the Chicago Bulls, among other teams, for 13 seasons, and was twice named an NBA All-Star.
