= Emma-Helena Nilsson =

Swedish beauty pageant contestant and cross-country skier

Personal information
- Nationality: Swedish
- Born: 1975 (age 50–51) Östersund, Sweden

Sport
- Sport: Skiing

Emma-Helena Nilsson (born 1975 in Östersund, Jämtland, Sweden) is a Swedish skier and beauty pageant titleholder who was crowned Miss Sweden 1999 and represented her country at Miss Universe 1999 pageant and cross-country skier. 34th place at Vasa Ski Marathon Race in the year of 2000.

Nilsson has graduated from a school of social work and public administration. Today she supplies models at her own company. She is married to Mathias Fredriksson.
