= Miss Sweden =

National beauty pageant competition in Sweden

Miss Sweden Organization
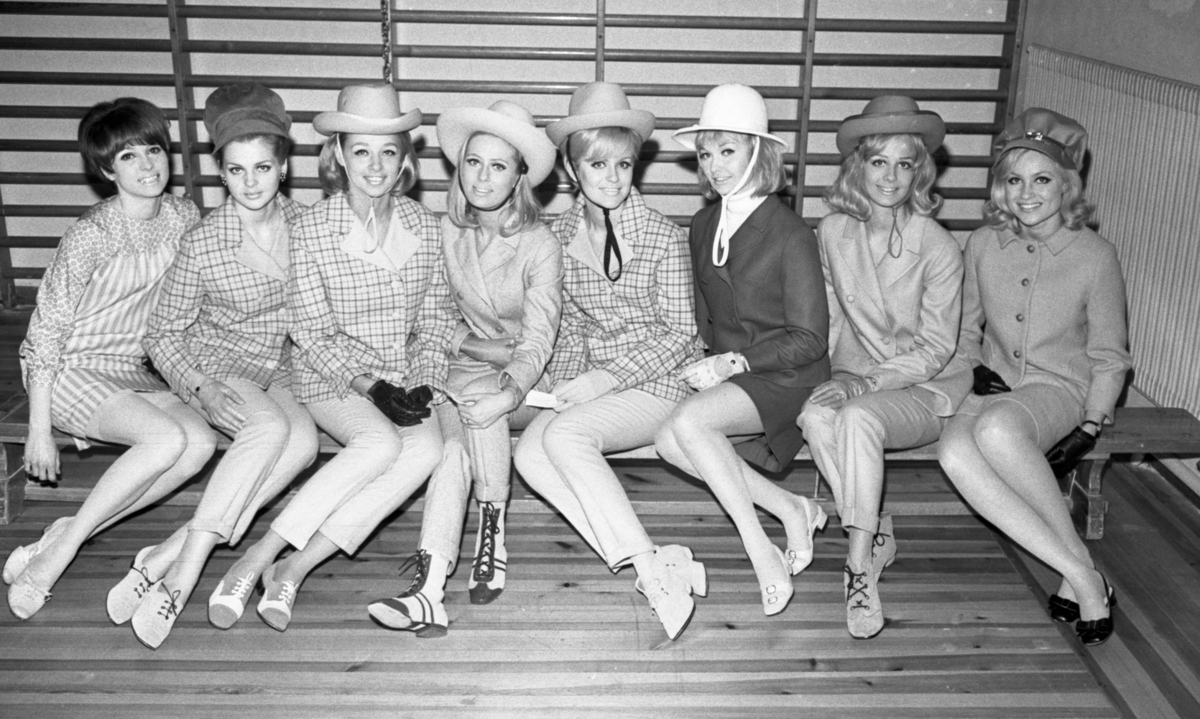
- Candidates for Miss Sweden 1967 seated on a gymnastic bench
- Formation: 1949; 77 years ago
- Type: Beauty pageant
- Headquarters: Stockholm
- Location: Sweden
- Members: Miss Universe; Miss International; Miss Supranational
- Official language: Swedish
- President: Joakim Granberg
- Website: Official website

The Miss Sweden or Miss Universe Sweden (Swedish: Fröken Sverige), is the title of the Swedish beauty pageant, qualifying delegates to the Miss Universe competition. In 2009 the pageant renamed as Miss Universe Sweden and the first national final was held on 6 June 2009, the National Day of Sweden. Among the judges were Yvonne Ryding, Miss Universe 1984. The pageant is a late branch of the Miss Sweden contest. The director of the contest is Joakim Granberg of the Starworld Entertainment Corporation.

== History ==
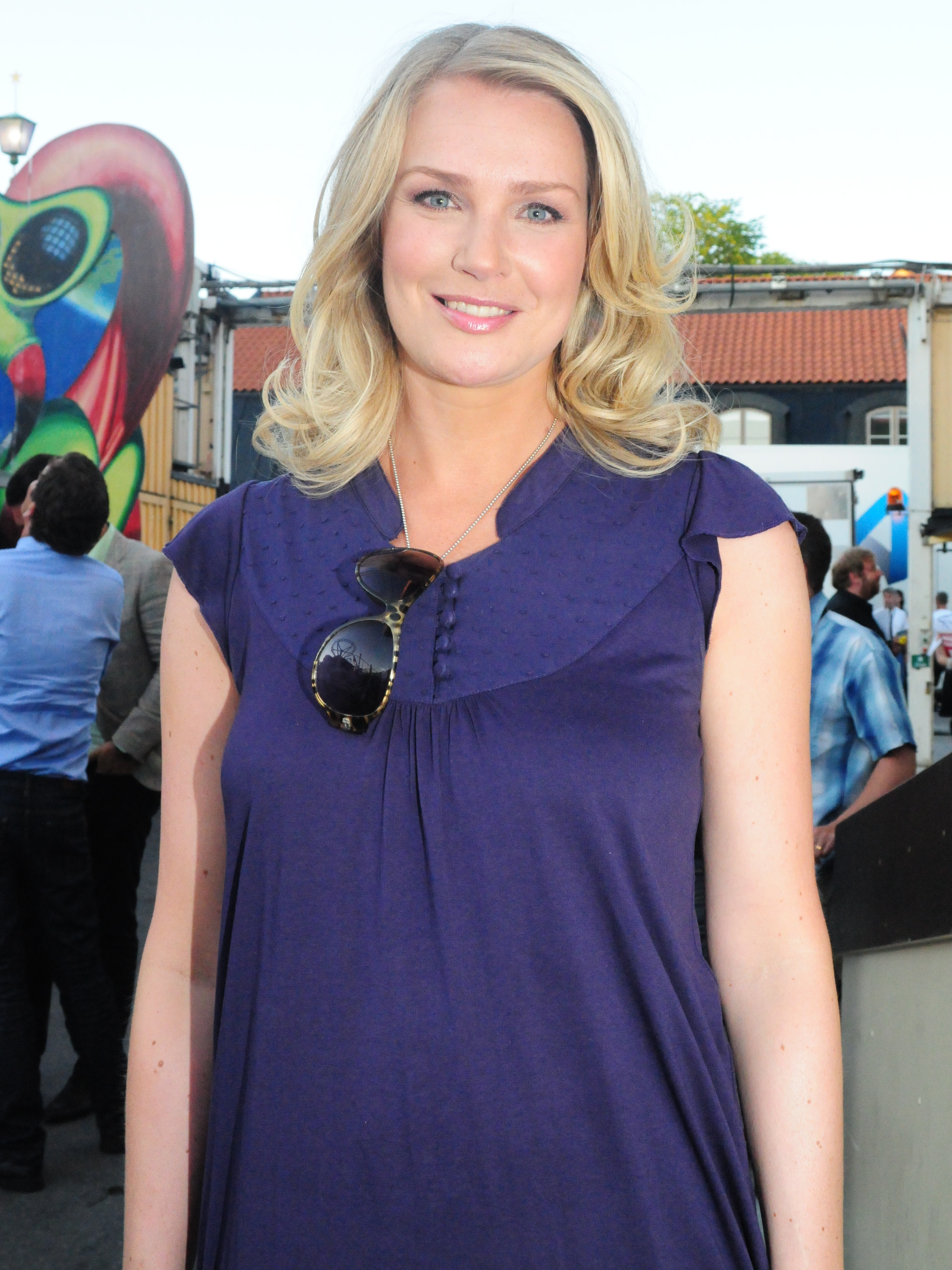
Annika Duckmark, Fröken Sverige 1996, during a television ceremony in 2009

Miss Sweden which ran from 1949 to 2003, introduced by the female magazine Vecko Revyn and later operated by production company Strix in partnership with MTG. The competition qualified delegates to the global contest Miss Universe.

The event was founded by Bonnier Media Group in 1948; the franchise was held from 1949 until 1999 by the magazine VeckoRevyn, and from 2000 to 2004 by the production company Strix. The first Miss Sweden pageant was won by Kerstin Ringberg. Through the years, many of the contestants went on to notable careers in music, acting and modelling, both domestically and internationally, including Anita Ekberg, Sivi Aberg, Mary Stävin, Lena Olin, Jessica Folcker and Victoria Silvstedt.

Franchise holder between 2001 and 2004 were Strix Productions and Moore Magazine. The event was cancelled after 2004, due to harassment by feminist organizations of the organizers, Strix.

After Miss Sweden, from 2006 and 2009, the Nya Fröken Sverige winner was sent to Miss Universe. The franchise holder moved to Miss Universe Sweden which is called as Miss Sweden in modern era since 2009. Beginning in 2012, three winners and two runners-up are selected. The Miss Universe Sweden competes in Miss Universe, the Miss International Sweden goes to compete in Miss International and the Miss Earth Sweden vies in Miss Earth.

== Notable winners ==
Pageant	Delegate	Location	Career
1952	Anne Marie Thistler	Mexico	Actress
1955	Hillevi Rombin	Los Angeles, California	Actress
1956	Ingrid Goude	United States	Actress
1961	Gunilla Knutsson	United States	Actress, model
1970	Kristina Wayborn	United States/UK	Actress
1978	Cécilia Rodhe	United States	Sculptor
1989	Louise Drevenstam	United States	Vice President of Camuto Group

== Format ==
Edition	Year	Presenter	Version	Winner	Represented	Venue	Voting	Delegates	Franchise	Broadcast
44th	1992	Adam Alsing	Dubai	Monica Brodd	Uppland	Grand Hôtel	Celebrity Panel	28	VeckoRevyn	TV4
45th	1993	Yvonne Ryding	Dubai	Johanna Lind	Östergötland	Grand Hôtel	Celebrity Panel	28	VeckoRevyn	TV4
46th	1994	Yvonne Ryding	Dubai	Domenique Forsberg	Lappland	Grand Hôtel	Celebrity Panel	28	VeckoRevyn	TV4
47th	1995	Martin Timell	Dubai	Petra Hultgren	Stockholm	TV4 Television Centre	Celebrity Panel	28	VeckoRevyn	TV4
48th	1996	Martin Timell	Canary Islands	Annika Duckmark	Västergötland	Berns Entertainment Centre	Celebrity Panel	28	VeckoRevyn	TV4
49th	1997	Agneta Sjödin	Canary Islands	Victoria Lagerström	Stockholm	Berns Entertainment Centre	Celebrity Panel	28	VeckoRevyn	TV4
50th	1998	Agneta Sjödin	Canary Islands	Jessica Olérs	Dalarna	Berns Entertainment Centre	Celebrity Panel	28	VeckoRevyn	TV4
51st	1999	Sofia Wistam	Canary Islands	Emma-Helena Nilsson	Jämtland	Circus Theatre	Celebrity Panel	28	VeckoRevyn	TV4
52nd	2000	Sofia Wistam	Canary Islands	Valerie Aflalo	Malmö	Circus Theatre	Hot Picks & Televoting	28	VeckoRevyn	TV4
53rd	2001	Lydia Capolicchio	Barbados	Malin Olsson	Dalarna	Grand Hôtel	SMS & Televoting	28	Strix	TV3/MTG
54th	2002	Ulrika Jonsson	Barbados	Malou Hansson	Uppland	Grand Hôtel	SMS & Televoting	28	Strix	TV3/MTG
55th	2003	Fredrik Birging	Barbados	Helena Stenbäck	Norrbotten	Grand Hôtel	SMS & Televoting	28	Strix	TV3/MTG

The year of 1992 was the first time the pageant was broadcast. The promoters were a commercial channel alongside a magazine released for females. The readers picked their favourites and the winner was chosen among a panel of judges. The Miss Universe pageant was shown on Swedish television for the first time ever a few months later.

In 2001, winners were picked via a telephone poll. There was still an acting jury, giving suggestions over whom they might believe be potential for the Miss Universe pageant.

The last winner was crowned in early 2004, with the winner being Katarina Wigander, and she was crowned by Moore! Magazine.

== Titleholders ==
Year	Miss Sweden / Fröken Sverige	County
1949	Kerstin Ringberg	Stockholm, Stockholm
1950	Ebba Adrian	Västra Götaland, Gothenburg
1951	Anita Ekberg†	Skåne, Malmö
1952	Anne Marie Thistler	Stockholm, Stockholm
1953	Ulla Sandklef	Västra Götaland, Gothenburg
1954	Ragnild Olausson	Västra Götaland, Alingsås
1955	Hillevi Rombin†; Miss Universe 1955	Gävleborg, Alfta
1956	Ingrid Goude	Gävleborg, Sandviken
1957	Inger Jonsson	Västra Götaland, Gothenburg
1958	Birgitta Gårdman	Stockholm, Stockholm
1959	Marie Louise Ekström	Västernorrland, Sundsvall
1960	Birgitta Öfling	Uppsala, Uppsala
1961	Gunilla Knutsson	Skåne, Ystad
1962	Monica Rågby	Västra Götaland, Gothenburg
1963	Kerstin Jonsson	Stockholm, Stockholm
1964	Siv Åberg	Gävleborg, Gävle
1965	Ingrid Norrman	Jönköping, Tranås
1966	Margareta Arvidsson; Miss Universe 1966	Västra Götaland, Vänersborg
1967	Eva-Lisa Svensson; Miss Scandinavia 1968	Västra Götaland, Gothenburg
1968	Anne Marie Hellqvist	Örebro, Hallsberg
1969	Birgitta Lindloff	Västra Götaland, Gothenburg
1970	Britt-Inger Johansson; Miss Scandinavia 1971	Kalmar, Nybro
1971	Vivian Öihanen	Stockholm, Vaxholm
1972	Britt-Marie Johansson	Stockholm, Stockholm
1973	Monica Sundin; Miss Scandinavia 1973	Stockholm, Stockholm
1974	Eva-Christine Römpke	Skåne, Malmö
1975	Catharina Sjödahl	Örebro, Örebro
1976	Caroline Westerberg	Uppsala, Tierp
1977	Birgitta Lindvall; Miss Scandinavia 1978	Norrbotten, Luleå
1978	Cécilia Rodhe	Västra Götaland, Gothenburg
1979	Anette Ekström	Södermanland, Eskilstuna
1980	Eva Birgitta Andersson	Västra Götaland, Uddevalla
1981	Eva-Lena Lundgren; Miss Scandinavia 1982	Norrbotten, Piteå
1982	Anna Kari Bergström	Norrbotten, Piteå
1983	Viveca Ljung	Västra Götaland, Gothenburg
1984	Yvonne Ryding; Miss Universe 1984	Södermanland, Eskilstuna
1985	Carina Marklund	Södermanland, Eskilstuna
1986	Anna Lena Rahmberg	Västra Götaland, Gothenburg
1987	Suzanne Thörngren	Stockholm, Handen
1988	Annika Davidsson	Västerbotten, Umeå
1989	Louise Drevenstam; Miss Scandinavia 1990	Örebro, Örebro
1990	Linda Isacsson	Västerbotten, Vilhelmina
1991	Susanna Gustafsson	Värmland, Grums
1992	Monica Brodd	Stockholm, Täby
1993	Johanna Lind	Östergötland, Linköping
1994	Domenique Forsberg	Norrbotten, Kiruna
1995	Petra Hultgren	Stockholm, Värmdö
1996	Annika Duckmark	Västra Götaland, Borås
1997	Victoria Lagerström	Stockholm, Stockholm
1998	Jessica Olérs	Dalarna, Borlänge
1999	Emma-Helena Nilsson	Jämtland, Östersund
2000	Valerie Aflalo	Skåne, Malmö
2001	Malin Olsson	Dalarna, Falun
2002	Malou Hansson	Stockholm, Stockholm
2003	Helena Stenbäck	Norrbotten, Piteå
2004	Katarina Wigander	Västra Götaland, Lerum
Year	Nya Fröken Sverige	County
2006	Josephine Alhanko	Stockholm, Stockholm
2007	Isabel Lestapier Winqvist; Resigned	Skåne, Helsingborg
2007	Lina Maria Hahne	Skåne, Helsingborg
2009	Azra Duliman	Skåne, Helsingborg
Year	Miss Sweden / Miss Universe Sweden	County
2009	Renate Veronica Cerljen	Skåne, Staffanstorp
2010	Michaela Savic	Skåne, Helsingborg
2011	Ronnia Fornstedt	Stockholm, Södertälje
2012	Hanni Beronius	Västra Götaland, Gothenburg
2013	Alexandra Friberg; Beauty of the World 2013	Stockholm, Stockholm
2014	Camilla Hansson	Stockholm, Stockholm
2015	Paulina Brodd	Stockholm, Stockholm
2016	Ida Ovmar; Miss Continents 2016	Norrbotten, Luleå
2017	Frida Fornander	Västra Götaland, Gothenburg
2018	Emma Strandberg	Västmanland, Hallstahammar
2019	Lina Ljungberg	Östergötland, Östergötland
2021	Moa Sandberg	Stockholm, Stockholm

== Titleholders under Miss Sweden org. ==
=== Miss Universe Sweden ===
- : Declared as Winner
- : Ended as runner-up or top 5/6 qualification
- : Ended as one of the finalists or semifinalists
- : Ended as special awards winner

The winner of Miss Sweden represents her country at the Miss Universe. On occasion, when the winner does not qualify (due to age) for either contest, a runner-up is sent. Before renamed as Miss Universe Sweden, the Miss Sweden (Fröken Sverige) will be sending the winner at the Miss Universe pageant.

Year	County	Miss Sweden	Placement at Miss Universe	Special Award(s)
2026	Stockholm	Josefin Strand	TBA	
2025	Stockholm	Daniella Lundqvist	Unplaced	
Did not compete between 2022—2024
2021	Stockholm	Moa Sandberg	Unplaced	
2020	Due to the impact of COVID-19 pandemic, no representative in 2020			
2019	Östergötland	Lina Ljungberg	Unplaced	
2018	Västmanland	Emma Strandberg	Unplaced	
2017	Västra Götaland	Frida Fornander	Unplaced	
2016	Norrbotten	Ida Ovmar	Unplaced	
2015	Stockholm	Paulina Brodd	Unplaced	
2014	Stockholm	Camilla Hansson	Unplaced	
2013	Stockholm	Alexandra Friberg	Unplaced	
2012	Västra Götaland	Hanni Beronius	Unplaced	
2011	Stockholm	Ronnia Fornstedt	Unplaced	Miss Photogenic
2010	Skåne	Michaela Savic	Unplaced	
2009	Skåne	Renate Cerljen	Top 15	
Nya Fröken Sverige / New Miss Sweden
Did not compete between 2007—2008
2006	Stockholm	Josephine Alhanko	Top 20	
Fröken Sverige / Miss Sweden
2005	Did not compete			
2004	Västra Götaland	Katarina Wigander	Unplaced	
2003	Norrbotten	Helena Stenbäck	Unplaced	
2002	Stockholm	Malou Hansson	Unplaced	
2001	Dalarna	Malin Olsson	Unplaced	
2000	Skåne	Valerie Aflalo	Unplaced	
1999	Jämtland	Emma Helena Nilsson	Unplaced	
1998	Dalarna	Jessica Olérs	Unplaced	
1997	Stockholm	Victoria Lagerström	Top 10	
1996	Västra Götaland	Annika Duckmark	Top 10	
1995	Stockholm	Petra Hultgren	Unplaced	Miss Photogenic
1994	Norrbotten	Domenique Forsberg	Top 10	
1993	Östergötland	Johanna Lind	Unplaced	
1992	Stockholm	Monica Brodd	Top 10	
1991	Värmland	Susanna Gustafsson	Unplaced	
1990	Västerbotten	Linda Isacsson	Unplaced	
1989	Örebro	Louise Drevenstam	1st Runner-up	
1988	Västerbotten	Annika Davidsson	Unplaced	
1987	Stockholm	Suzanne Thörngren	Top 10	
1986	Västra Götaland	Anna Lena Rahmberg	Unplaced	
1985	Södermanland	Carina Marklund	Unplaced	
1984	Södermanland	Yvonne Ryding	Miss Universe 1984	
1983	Västra Götaland	Viveka Miriam Jung	Unplaced	
1982	Norrbotten	Anna Kari Bergström	Unplaced	
1981	Norrbotten	Eva-Lena Lundgren	2nd Runner-up	
1980	Västra Götaland	Eva Birgitta Andersson	4th Runner-up	
1979	Södermanland	Anette Marie Ekström	4th Runner-up	
1978	Västra Götaland	Cecilia Björnsdotter Rodhe	4th Runner-up	
1977	Norrbotten	Birgitta Lindvall	Unplaced	
1976	Uppsala	Caroline Westerberg	Unplaced	
1975	Örebro	Catharina Sjödahl	3rd Runner-up	
1974	Skåne	Eva-Christine Römpke	Unplaced	
1973	Stockholm	Monica Sundin	Unplaced	
1972	Stockholm	Britt Marie Johansson	Unplaced	
1971	Stockholm	Vivian Öihanen	Unplaced	
1970	Kalmar	Kristina Wayborn	Top 15	Best Swimsuit
1969	Västra Götaland	Birgitta Lindloff	Top 15	
1968	Örebro	Anette Marie Hellqvist	Top 15	Best Swimsuit
1967	Västra Götaland	Eva-Lisa Svensson	Top 15	Best Swimsuit
1966	Västra Götaland	Margareta Arvidsson	Miss Universe 1966	Miss Photogenic
1965	Jönköping	Ingrid Norman	3rd Runner-up	
1964	Gävleborg	Siv Märta Åqvist	4th Runner-up	
1963	Stockholm	Kicki Margareta Jonsson	Unplaced	
1962	Skåne	Karin Hyldegard Jensen	Unplaced	
1961	Skåne	Gunilla Knutsson	Top 15	
1960	Uppsala	Birgitta Öfling	Unplaced	
1959	Västernorrland	Marie Louise Ekström	Top 15	
1958	Stockholm	Birgitta Elisabeth Gårdman	Top 15	
1957	Västra Götaland	Ingrid Margareta Jonsson	Top 15	
1956	Gävleborg	Ingrid Goude	2nd Runner-up	
1955	Gävleborg	Hillevi Rombin†	Miss Universe 1955	
1954	Västra Götaland	Ragnild Olausson	4th Runner-up	
1953	Västra Götaland	Ulla Sandkler	Unplaced	
1952	Stockholm	Anne Marie Thistler	Top 10	

=== Miss International Sweden ===
- : Declared as Winner
- : Ended as runner-up or top 5/6 qualification
- : Ended as one of the finalists or semifinalists
- : Ended as special awards winner

Miss International Sweden is a beauty pageant for Swedish females where the winner is sent to represent Sweden at the Miss International. In 2011, the second title of Miss Universe Sweden pageant will be awarding as the Miss International Sweden. On occasion, when the winner does not qualify (due to age) for either contest, a runner-up is sent. Before running under Miss Universe Sweden Organization the Miss International Sweden will be selecting by Årent Runt in 1960–1994 and Fashion For Integration in 2000–2008.

Year	County	Miss Sweden International	Placement at Miss International	Special Award(s)
Did not compete since 2020—Present
2019	Stockholm	Paulina Kielczewska	Unplaced	
2018	Östergötland	Izabell Hahn	Unplaced	
2017	Östergötland	Lina Ljungberg	Unplaced	
2016	Halland	Maria Taipaleenmäki	Unplaced	
2015	Stockholm	Isabella Jedler Forsman	Did not compete	
2014	Stockholm	Moa Sandberg	Unplaced	
2013	Stockholm	Eleonore Lilja	Unplaced	
2012	Stockholm	Katarina Konow	Unplaced	
2011	Stockholm	Denice Andrée	Top 15	
Miss Sweden International by Fashion for Integration
Did not compete between 2009—2010
2008	Jönköping	Jenny Jansson	Unplaced	
Did not compete between 2006—2007
2005	Stockholm	Cecilia Zatterlöf Kristensen	Unplaced	
Did not compete between 2003—2004
2002	—	Emelie Lundqvist	Unplaced	
2001	—	Sara Nicole Cameron	Unplaced	
2000	—	Gabrielle Elisabeth Heinerborg	Top 15	
Miss Sweden International by Årent Runt
Did not compete between 1995—1999
1994	—	Mirja Kristina Haglöf	Top 15	
1993	—	Anna Hovenstam	Unplaced	
1992	—	Camilla Ingeborg Unsgaard	Unplaced	
1991	Did not compete			
1990	—	Monica Halina Andersson	Top 15	
1989	—	Isabelle Soelmann	Unplaced	
1988	—	Ulrika Helena Westerberg	Unplaced	
1987	Did not compete			
1986	—	Suzanne Marie Lundmark	Top 15	Miss Photogenic
1985	Did not compete			
1984	—	Gunilla Maria Kohlström	2nd Runner-up	
1983	Did not compete			
1982	—	Camilla Engström	Unplaced	
1981	—	Anna Helena Lindgow	Top 15	
1980	Did not compete			
1979	—	Anna Angela Bratt	Unplaced	
1978	—	Birgitta Eriksson	Unplaced	
1977	—	Lena Jernberg	Unplaced	
1976	—	Maria Gunilla Borhäll	Top 15	
1975	—	Kicki Anita Olsson	Top 15	
1974	—	Monica Söderqvist	Top 15	
1973	Did not compete			
1972	—	Eva Andersson	Unplaced	
1971	—	Maud Andersson	Unplaced	
1970	—	Rita Rudolfsson Berntsson	Unplaced	
1969	—	Bodil Jensen	Unplaced	
1968	—	Annika Hemminge	1st Runner-up	
1967	—	Gunilla Margareta Sundberg	Top 15	
1966	No contest			
1965	—	Agneta Evelyne Holst	Unplaced	
1964	—	Birgitta Elisabeth Alverljung	Top 15	
1963	—	Rina Krusvik	Top 15	
1962	—	Karin Hyldegaard Jensen	Unplaced	
1961	—	Elisabeth Oden	Unplaced	
1960	—	Gunilla Elm	Unplaced	

=== Miss Supranational Sweden ===
- : Declared as Winner
- : Ended as runner-up or top 5/6 qualification
- : Ended as one of the finalists or semifinalists
- : Ended as special awards winner

Year	County	Miss Sweden Supranational	Placement at Miss Supranational	Special Award(s)
2021	Stockholm	Jacqueline Rybak	Unplaced	
2020	Due to the impact of COVID-19 pandemic, no representative in 2020			
2016	Stockholm	Moa Johandersson	Unplaced	
2015	Stockholm	Stina Pernilla Nordlander	Unplaced	
2014	Stockholm	Ida Ovmar	Top 20	Best Body
2013	Stockholm	Sally Assi Elaine Linnéa Lindren	Unplaced	
2012	Värmland	Sandra Yvonne Larsson	Unplaced	
2011	Stockholm	Sara Weidenblad	Unplaced	Best Body
2010	Stockholm	Nina Sjölin	Unplaced	Miss Elegance

== See also ==
- Miss World Sweden
- Miss Earth Sweden
