= Ivana Gagula =

Bosnia and Herzegovina model (born 1988)

- Born: August 21, 1988 (age 38); Banja Luka, Bosnia and Herzegovina
- Occupation: Model
- Known for: Miss Earth Sweden 2007; Top 16 Semifinalist at Miss Earth 2007
- Title: Miss Earth Sweden 2007

Ivana Gagula (born 21 August 1988) is a Swedish model and beauty pageant titleholder who won Miss Earth Sweden 2007. Gagula represented Sweden in the 2007 Miss Earth beauty pageant, held in Quezon City, the Philippines, on 11 November, where she ended up as Top 16 Semifinalist.

Gagula is Croatian born in Banja Luka, Bosnia and Herzegovina.

== Sources ==
- Ivana Gagula at Miss Earth
- Ivana Gagula Biography
