= Veckorevyn =

Women's magazine in Sweden

VeckoRevyn
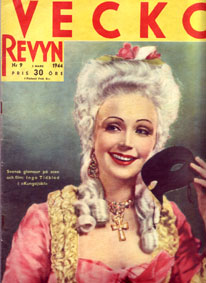
- Inga Tidblad on the cover of Veckorevyn
- Editor: Irena Pozar
- Categories: Women's magazine; Lifestyle magazine
- Frequency: Weekly (1935–1999); Fortnightly (1999–2011); Monthly (2011–2016); Bimonthly (2016–2018)
- Circulation: 40,600 (2014)
- Publisher: PYT Media AB
- Founder: Albert Bonnier
- Founded: 1935
- Company: PYT Media AB
- Country: Sweden
- Based in: Stockholm
- Language: Swedish
- Website: VeckoRevyn

VeckoRevyn (Swedish: Weekly Review) is a Swedish lifestyle and women's magazine published in Stockholm, Sweden. It was published in print copies between 1935 and December 2018. Since 2019, it is only digitally available.

== History and profile ==
VeckoRevyn was created in 1935 by Albert Bonnier, released by Bonnier Media Group. The publisher of the magazine was Bonnier Tidskrifter AB, and its headquarters is in Stockholm.

Ebba von Sydow edited the magazine. Bertil Torekull was one of the editors-in-chief of the magazine, who was also the editor-in-chief of another magazine Bildjournalen.

It was Bonnier's then development manager Gunny Widell who refocused the magazine, which gave her the Grand Journalist Award in 1981. Veckorevyn.com started in 2001 and is today one of Sweden's largest magazine sites. Every week, Veckorevyn arranges the blog event Blog Awards and runs the campaign Size Hero - for healthier ideals in the fashion industry.

It was launched as a weekly magazine. In later years, it has reduced the frequency of publishing, in line with declining circulation and investments on the Internet. It was published weekly between 1935 and 1999, while until 2011 it was published fortnightly. Starting with the October 2011 issue, it was published monthly, with the aim of producing a magazine with fuller editorial material. By 2016, it became a bimonthly. At the same time, a large part of its young readers considered having abandoned it. However, no name change was relevant, as the publisher considered "Veckorevyn" to be a strong brand.

VeckoRevyn sold 67,000 copies in 1999. In 2014 the circulation of the magazine was 40,600 copies. The magazine was the owner of Miss Sweden beauty pageant.
