= Eloisa Cianni =

Italian actress, model and beauty pageant titleholder (1932–2022)

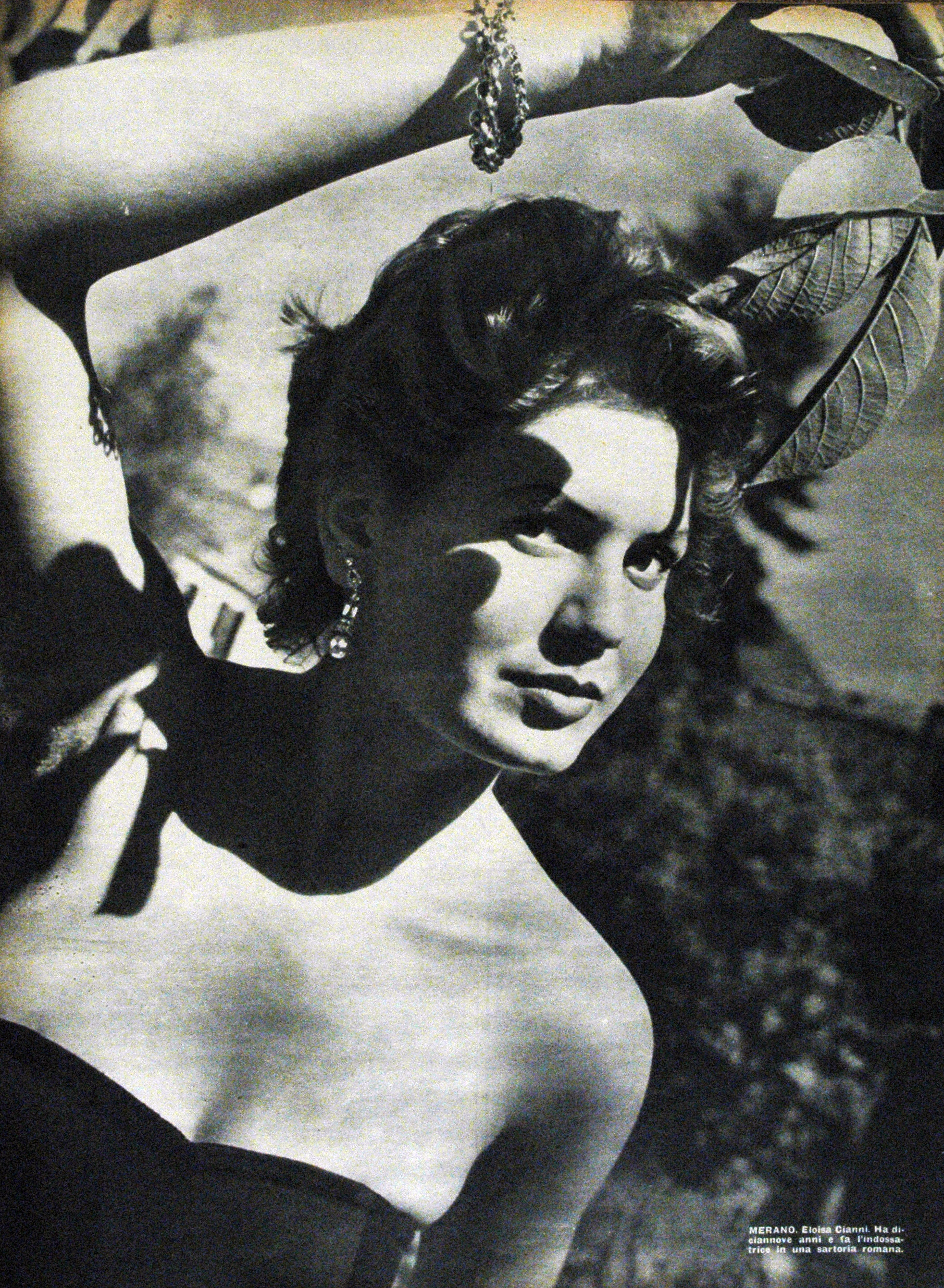
- Born: Aloisa Stukin; 23 June 1932; Rome, Kingdom of Italy
- Died: 27 May 2022 (aged 89); Morlupo, Rome, Italy
- Occupation: Actress
- Years active: 1952–1961

Eloisa Cianni (23 June 1932 – 27 May 2022) was an Italian actress, model and beauty pageant winner.

Cianni was born in Rome as Aloisa Stukin, with the surname derived from her Polish adoptive father Stanislaus Stukin, who had married her mother Ida Furnace.

In 1952 she won the Miss Italia beauty contest, and one year later she was elected Miss Europe.

Cianni subsequently started a career as model and actress, debuting in the Gianni Franciolini's 1953 comedy film Villa Borghese.

Cianni died in Morlupo on 27 May 2022, at the age of 89.
