= Anne Marie Thistler =

Swedish model and actress (1932–2020)

Anne Marie Tistler
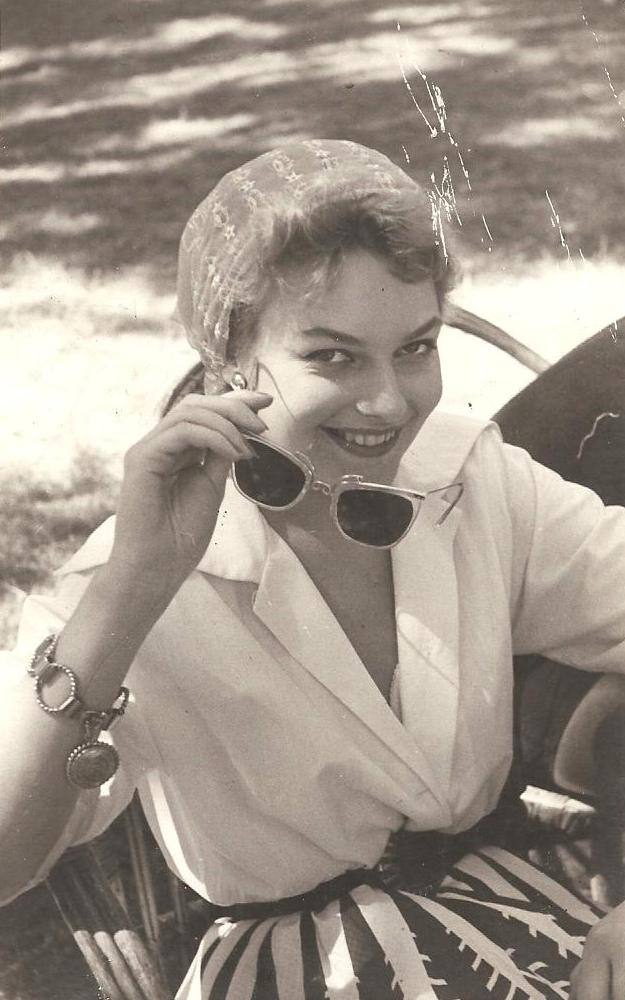
- Anne Marie Tistler, 1954
- Born: Anne Marie Tistler; 20 December 1932
- Died: 2 November 2020 (aged 87)
- Beauty pageant titleholder
- Title: Miss Sweden 1952
- Major competitions: Miss Sweden 1952 (Winner); Miss Universe 1952 (Top 10)

Anne Marie Tistler de Bosques (20 December 1932 – 2 November 2020) was a Swedish actress, model and beauty pageant titleholder who was crowned first ever Miss Sweden in 1952. She emigrated to Mexico in 1952 where she married Gilberto Bosques Manjarrez. She appeared in films during the 1950s. Thistler died on 2 November 2020, at the age of 87.

== Appearances in films ==
- 1954 - Divisionen
- 1955 - Hunden och bilen
- 1957 - Vägen genom Skå
