= Denice Andrée =

Swedish model and beauty queen

Denice Andrée is a Swedish model and beauty pageant titleholder who was crowned Miss International Sweden 2011 and Miss Earth Sweden 2013. In 2011, Denice represented Sweden in Miss International 2011 held in China and placed in the Top 15, in August 2013, she was handpicked to represent Sweden at Miss Earth 2013.

In 2015, she is participating in the Sjuan show Robinson: Love Edition.
