= Ronnia Fornstedt =

Swedish model and beauty queen

Ronnia Stephanie Fornstedt
- Born: Ronnia Fornstedt; 25 December 1990 (age 35); Södertälje, Sweden
- Height: 1.80 m (5 ft 11 in)
- Beauty pageant titleholder
- Title: Miss Universe Sweden 2011
- Hair color: Brown
- Eye color: Blue
- Major competitions: Miss Universe Sweden 2011 (Winner); Miss Universe 2011 (Unplaced) (Miss Photogenic)

Ronnia Stephanie Fornstedt (born 25 December 1990) is a Swedish fashion model and beauty pageant titleholder who won Miss Universe Sweden 2011 then represented her country at Miss Universe 2011.

== Miss Universe Sweden 2011 ==
Fornstedt was crowned Miss Universe Sweden 2011 in June and represented Sweden at Miss Universe 2011 in São Paulo, Brazil on September 12. She won the Miss Photogenic award. The crowning was made by Starworld Entertainment.

Fornstedt has been signed with agencies such as Elite Stockholm and Zap Models. Fornstedt became the face of Transderma Skin Care after her crowning in June 2011.

She was personally invited by former Miss Sweden 1989 and first runner up at Miss Universe 1989, Louise Camuto (née Drevenstam) to visit the Camuto Group showroom in New York City where she received wardrobe for Miss Universe. Ronnia is also being outfitted by Maggie Norris Couture.

== Biography ==
Ronnia's father left the family when she was just a one year old, her mother passed when she was twelve. Ronnia spent the rest of her childhood with her older sister and family in Södertälje. Ronnia currently resides in Södertälje, Sweden.
