= Renate Cerljen =

Swedish model

- Born: Renate Veronica Cerljen; March 26, 1988 (age 38); Staffanstorp, Sweden
- Height: 1.75 m (5 ft 9 in)
- Beauty pageant titleholder
- Title: Miss Universe Sweden 2009; Miss Earth Sweden 2011
- Hair color: Brown
- Eye color: Brown
- Major competitions: Miss Universe Sweden 2009 (Winner); Miss Universe 2009 (Top 15); Miss Beauty of the World 2010 (Top 5); Miss Earth Sweden 2011 (Winner); Miss Earth 2011 (Top 16)

Renate Veronica Cerljen (born March 26, 1988, in Staffanstorp, Sweden) is a Swedish model and beauty pageant titleholder who the first ever winner of the Miss Universe Sweden pageant, which she won on June 6, 2009. Cerljen represented Sweden at the Miss Universe 2009 pageant on the Bahamas on August 23, 2009, and placed in the Top 15. Renate was the first non-winner of the Miss Sweden pageant since 1952 to represent Sweden at Miss Universe since Miss Sweden lost its rights to crown a contestant for Miss Universe earlier in 2009.

Cerljen represented Sweden in Miss Earth 2011, which took place in Manila, Philippines on December 3. She was chosen internally by the organization as Miss Earth Sweden 2011. In the final she made the Top 16.

Cerljen has previously been an elite gymnast but had to quit in 2005 because of an injury during training.
