= Satu Tuomisto =

Satu Tuomisto may refer to:

- Satu Tuomisto (choreographer)
- Satu Tuomisto (model)
