= Tuomisto =

Tuomisto is a Finnish surname. Notable people with the surname include:

- Satu Tuomisto (choreographer), Finnish choreographer
- Satu Tuomisto (born 1986), Finnish model
- Pekka Tuomisto (born 1960), Finnish ice hockey player
