= Ponterosa =

2001 film by Mika Kemmo, and Pasi Kemmo

- Original Finnish film poster
- Directed by: Mika Kemmo; Pasi Kemmo
- Written by: Mika Kemmo
- Produced by: Pasi Kemmo
- Starring: Tony Halme; Heikki Paavilainen; Timo Julkunen
- Cinematography: Tero Molin
- Edited by: Roy-Petri Pashur
- Music by: Aku Lundström
- Production companies: Inxpo Onnico; Mancantoo
- Distributed by: FS Film; Finnkino; Sandrew Metronome Distribution
- Release date: 30 March 2001
- Running time: 110 minutes
- Country: Finland
- Language: Finnish
- Budget: circa €400,000

Ponterosa is a 2001 Finnish comedy film directed by brothers Mika and Pasi Kemmo. The film takes place in a campsite in Åland, where a group of very different people get to know each other.

== Cast ==
- Tony Halme as Mauri, "Maukka"
- Heikki Paavilainen as Jussi
- Timo Julkunen as Oskari Mäkelä
- Paula Siimes as Stella, Mauri's sister
- Karita Tuomola as Monica
- Jenni Ahola as Nelli
- Laura West as Maria
- Matti Tuominen as Lauri, "Late", Mauri's and Stella's father
- Vesa Vierikko as a urologist
- Jarmo Mäkinen as a Coastal Swede
- Tuija Ernamo as Saara, Oskari's wife
- Santeri Kinnunen as a family man at the campsite
- Esko Nikkari as a rural householder on the ship
- Lasse Karkjärvi as a travel agency clerk
- Mattiesko Hytönen as a real man, Saara's lover
- Olli Haaslahti as a young Mauri
- Tom Lindfors as a lawyer
- Ante Kangas as Rolf
- Tuija Timberbacka as a religious person
- Janne Itämies

== Production ==
As Ponterosa was one of the few major Finnish films in 2001 that did not receive any financial support from the Finnish Film Foundation, the production was mainly privately funded by a number of companies. Due to this sponsorship, the film contains product placement.

Parts of Ponterosa were shot in Helsinki, Kirkkonummi, Vantaa, and Åland.

=== Music ===
1. "Zulu Stomp" (Big Bertha and The Bulldozers)
2. "Wild Thing" (The Troggs)
3. "Hurt" (Carly Simon)
4. "Huilu portailla" (Aku Lundström)
5. "Volare" (Bobby Rydell)
6. "Batman Theme" (composed by Neal Hefti)
7. "Raindrops Keep Fallin' on My Head" (B. J. Thomas)
8. "Set U Free" (K-System)
9. "Only You" (The Platters)
10. "Cuy Cuy" (Zapata)
11. "Lopputekstit teema" (Aku Lundström)
12. "Reveille Rock" (Johnny & The Hurricanes)
13. "Lollipop" (Ronald and Ruby)
14. "Jos jotain yrittää / Harva meistä on rautaa" (Tony Halme)
15. "I Love How You Love Me" (The Paris Sisters)
16. "Will You Love Me Tomorrow" (The Shirelles)
17. "Let It Be Me" (Teukka & Tanja)
18. "Social Outcast" (Big Bertha and The Bulldozers)

==== Soundtrack album ====
The soundtrack album for the film, Soundtrack elokuvasta Ponterosa, was released by Edel Records. The album contains 15 tracks. Subsequently, a music video for the album's bonus track "Leikiten" was also released.

== Marketing ==
Ponterosa was promoted by the film roles of then well-known celebrities. The presence of Karita Tuomola, a television host and the 1997 Miss Finland, and Tony Halme, a professional boxer and wrestler, were used to gain media attention for the film. The celebrity cast also included Jenni Ahola, who was known as the 1997 Miss Hawaiian Tropic of Finland, the 1997 Miss Internet, an Olvi ad girl and as the CEO of the modeling agency Promodel.

The DVD version of Ponterosa was released on 14 July 2006.

== Reception ==
Receiving only 2,552 admissions, Ponterosa was also poorly received by the critics. The film was criticized for its poor script and dialogue. The technical implementation, especially cinematography, was described as amateurish. Despite the heavy criticism, Ponterosa has subsequently gained significant camp value, and it has been referred to as "the camp classic of Finnish cinema".
