= Tykkä =

Tykkä is a surname. Notable people with the surname include:

- Karita Tykkä (born 1976), Finnish television host
- Salla Tykkä (born 1973), Finnish artist
