= Maj-Len Grönholm =

Finnish politician

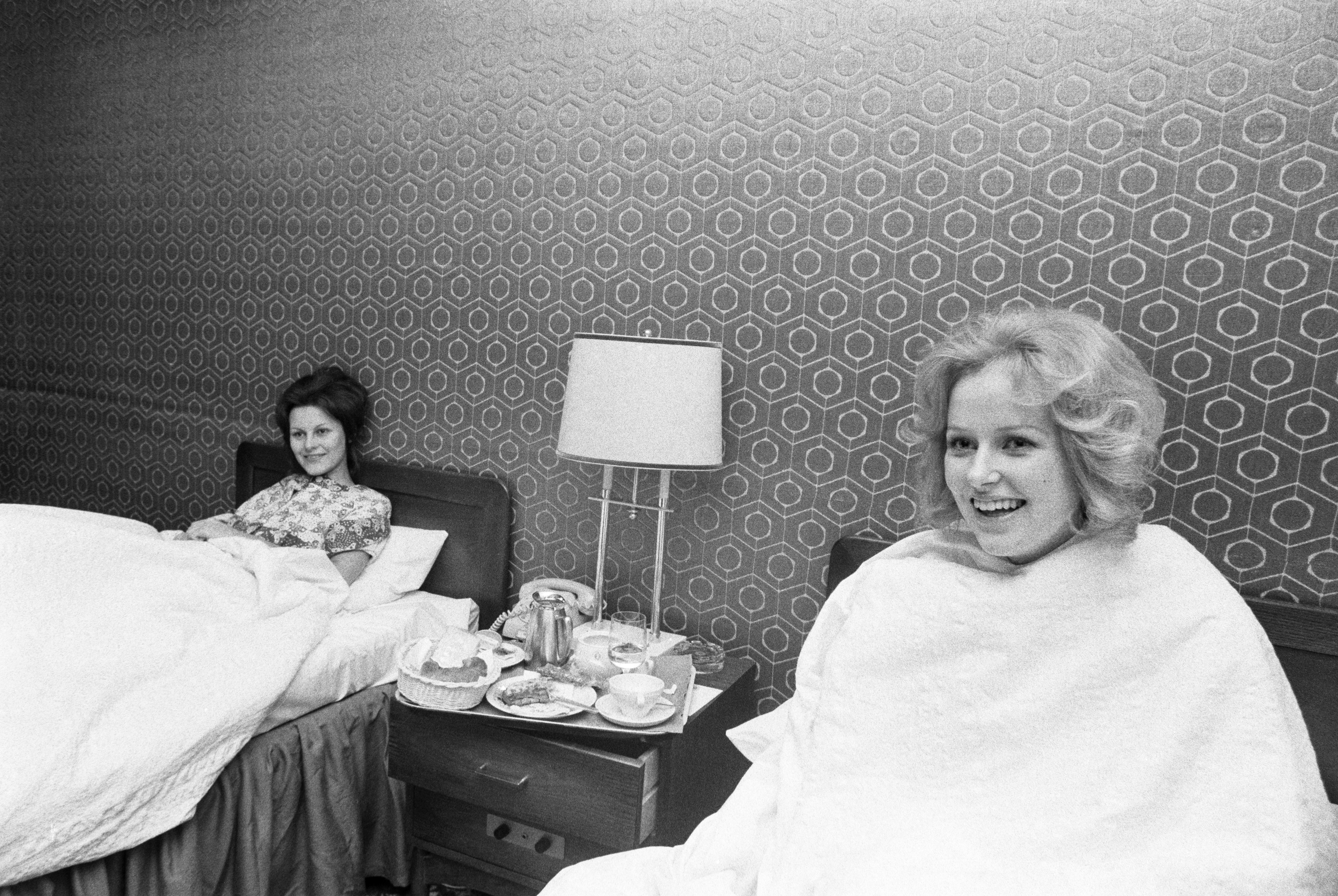
Maj-Len Eriksson (right) in 1972

Maj-Len Grönholm (née Eriksson, 5 June 1952 Helsinki – 22 June 2009, Ingå) was a Finnish politician (Swedish People's Party), councilwoman and a former Miss Finland. As a beauty pageant competitor, she won Miss Finland in 1972 under her maiden name of Eriksson and placed fourth in Miss Scandinavia in 1973. After she stopped competing, she worked as the principal at Källhagens skola, a Swedish-speaking junior high school in Lohja. In March 2009, she went on sick leave and was in the process of applying for a disability pension when she died three months later.

For sixteen years, she served as a councilwoman for the cities of Kauniainen and Espoo. She also ran for parliament twice. Since the beginning of 2009, she also served as a councilwoman for the municipality of Ingå until her death.

Grönholm had breast cancer. She underwent surgery to remove the tumors twice, first in 2002 and again in 2004. By 2007 the disease had spread to her liver. Grönholm died of cancer in 2009.
