= Räikkönen =

Räikkönen is a surname. Notable people with the surname include:

- Erkki Räikkönen (1900–1961), Finnish politician
- Ville Räikkönen (born 1972), Finnish biathlete
- Rami Räikkönen (born 1977), Finnish racing and rally driver and is the brother of Kimi Räikkönen
- Kimi Räikkönen (born 1979), Finnish Formula One driver and 2007 Formula One world champion
- Jenni Maria Dahlman-Räikkönen (born 1981), Finnish model
