= Miss Tampere =

Beauty pageant

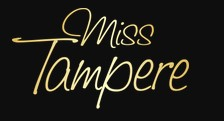

Miss Tampere is a Finnish beauty pageant that has been held regularly since 2012.

== Information ==
The competition was first held in 2012 and is run by the modelling agency, Studio Face. The competition is only open to citizens of Finland over the age of 18. There are no other major restrictions as married women, mothers and women with visible tattoos are allowed to compete. The competition is free to enter and applications are typically accepted in October. The competition is held in Tampere, Finland.

Controversy arose in 2015 when a Miss Tampere finalist was revealed to only be 17-years-old. The contestant was removed from the competition, and she was replaced by another competitor.

== Winners ==
Year	Winner	1st Crown Princess	2nd Crown Princess
2012	Hanna Granlund	Anni Hankimäki	Janette Karvonen
2013	Emma Juureva	Maija Yläpelto	Sara Leinonen
2014	Jenni Peräinen	Nina Heinikoski	Marika Mattus-Elo
2015	Tiina Virranta	Hanna Ojaniemi	Heidi Häkli
2016	Liisa-Maria Pukkila	Henna Hakala	Karin Stenius
2017	Marietta Veijalainen	Anniina Halonen	Riina Ahomaa
2018	Sheila Da Costa	Vilhelmiina Riuttala	Emilia Lumio
2019	Amanda Teuho	Emilia Lepomäki	Noora Manninen
2020	Emilia Lintala	Janette Mikkola	Liina Raatikainen
2021	Matilda Wirtavuori	Julia Podkolina	Noora Rauhala
2022	Kukka-Maaria Halme	Roosa Tuominen	Jenna Hyttinen
