= Miss Baltic Sea =

Beauty pageant

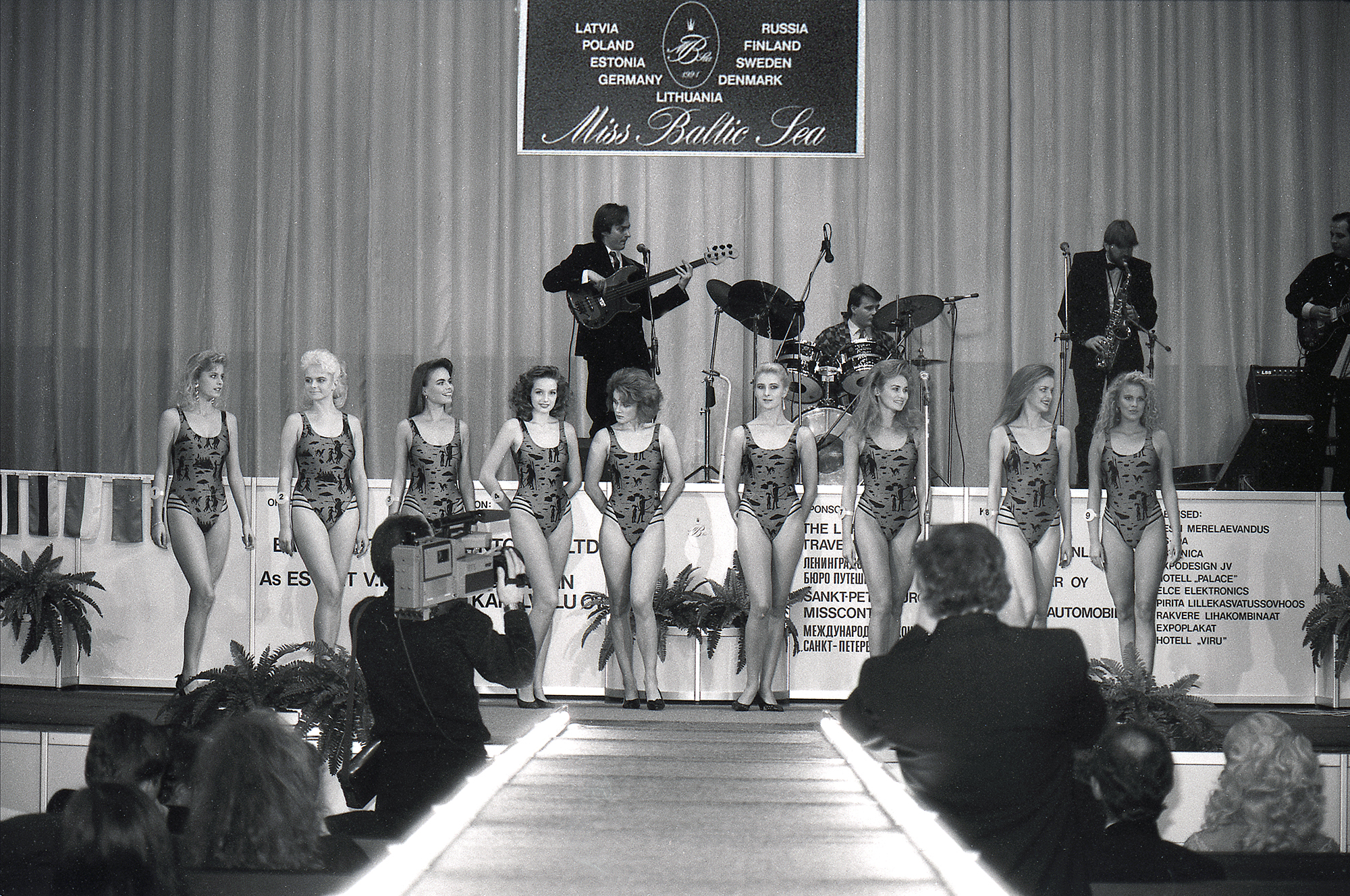
Miss Baltic Sea 1991 in Tallinn

Miss Baltic Sea was a beauty pageant for countries that border the Baltic Sea: Denmark, Estonia, Finland, Germany, Latvia, Lithuania, Poland, Russia and Sweden. It merged with Miss Scandinavia for the years 2007 and 2008 and then that merged pageant was discontinued.

== Winners ==
Year	Miss Baltic Sea	Country
1991	Nina Andersson (model)	Finland
1992	Liis Tappo	Estonia
1993	Rasa Kukenyte	Lithuania
1994	Anna Malova	Russia
1995	Eva-Maria Laan	Estonia
1996	Agnieszka Zych	Poland
1997	Nadine Schmidt	Germany
1998	Karita Tuomola	Finland
1999	Kadri Väljaots	Estonia
2000	Mirosława Strojny	Poland
2001	Dagmar Makko	Estonia
2002	Heidi Willman	Finland
2003	Natascha Börger	Germany
2004	Anna Maria Strömberg	Finland
2005	Mira Salo	Finland
2006	Malwina Ratajczak	Poland
2007	Dorota Gawron	Poland
2008	Fanney Lára Guomundsdóttir	Iceland

== See also ==
- Miss Denmark, Miss Universe Denmark, Miss World Denmark
- Suomen Neito, Miss Finland
- Miss Sweden, Miss Universe Sweden, Miss World Sweden
- Miss Estonia
- Mis Latvija, Miss Universe Latvia
- Miss Lithuania
- Miss Russia, Krasa Rossii
- Miss Germany, Miss Universe Germany, Miss World Germany
- Miss Polonia, Miss Polski, Miss Earth Poland
- Miss Universe
- Miss World
- Miss International
- Miss Europe
