= Nina Björnström =

Finnish beauty pageant winner

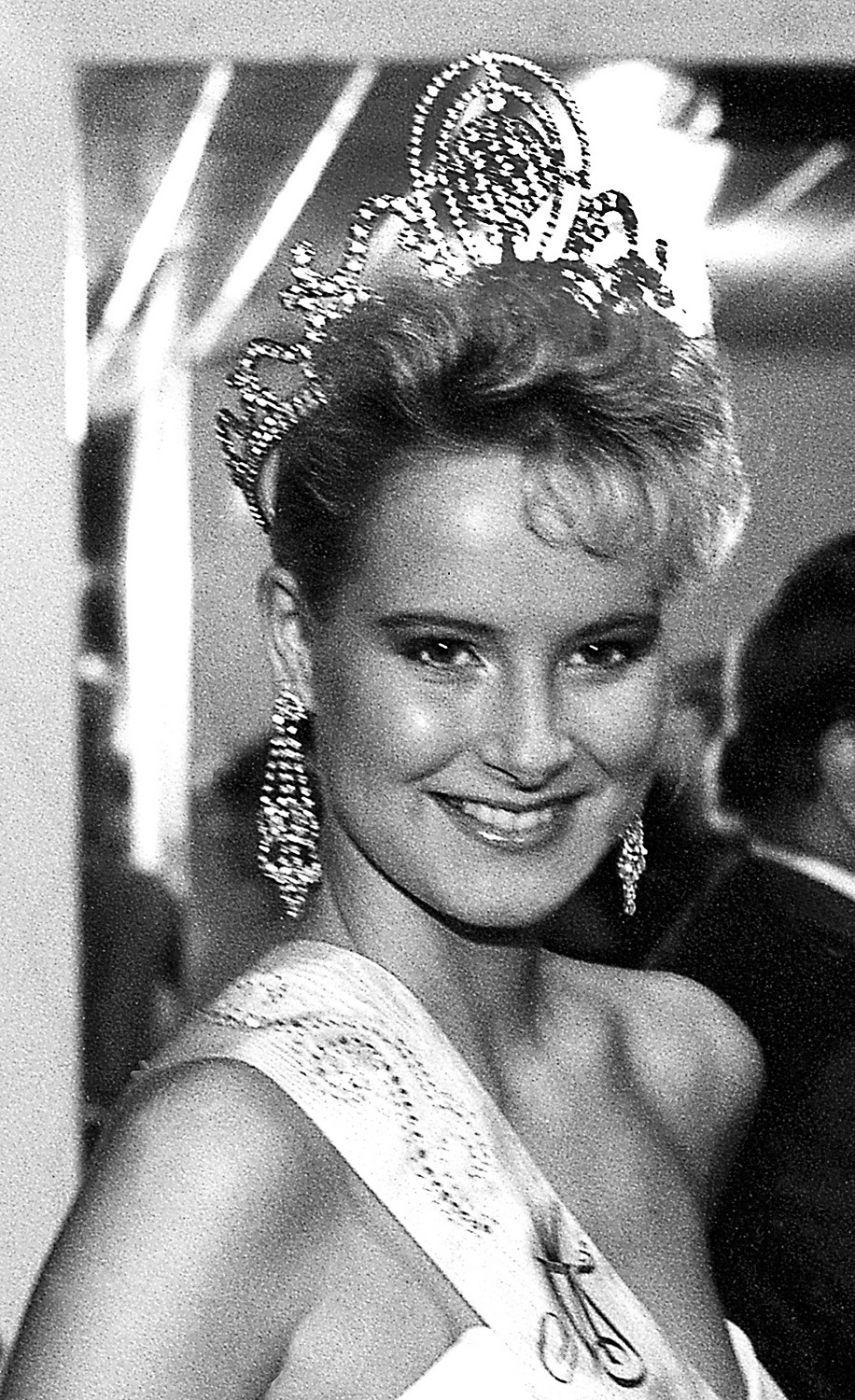
- Born: Nina Carita Björnström
- Beauty pageant titleholder
- Title: Miss Finland 1988
- Major competition: Miss Universe 1988

Nina Carita Björnström-Lehtonen (born c. 1966) is a Finnish actress, model and beauty pageant titleholder who was crowned Miss Finland 1988 and competed in the 1988 Miss Universe pageant. She was 1st runner up in the 1989 Miss Scandinavia pageant.

She has also worked as a flight attendant.
