= Lotta Hintsa =

Finnish model and mountain climber

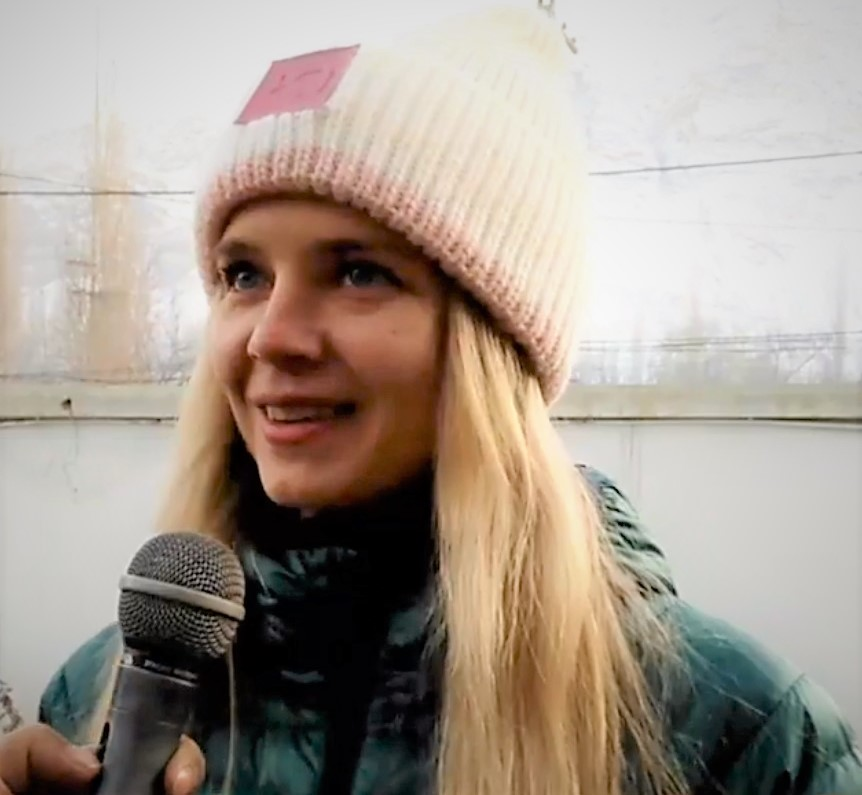
- Hintsa interviewed in 2019
- Born: Lotta Henriikka Hintsa; 14 December 1988 (age 37); Nurmo, Finland
- Other name: Lotta Näkyvä
- Occupations: Model, mountain climber
- Height: 1.68 m (5 ft 6 in)
- Beauty pageant titleholder
- Title: Miss Finland 2013
- Hair color: Blonde
- Eye color: Blue
- Major competitions: Miss Finland 2013 (Winner); Miss Universe 2013 (Unplaced)

Lotta Henriikka Hintsa (known as Lotta Näkyvä from 2016 to 2019, born 14 December 1988) is a Finnish model, mountaineer and beauty pageant titleholder who was crowned Miss Finland 2013 and represented her country at Miss Universe 2013.

== Early life ==
Hintsa was born in Nurmo. As a child, she lived in Ethiopia during two separate periods in 1992–1993 in the village of Shebe, 500 km (310 mi) from the capital Addis Ababa. The villagers brought the family a leopard cub, which the children were allowed to pet, until the animal scratched one of the children quite badly. From Ethiopia the family moved to Seinäjoki, Finland, until in 1997 they returned to Ethiopia for another two years, living this time in Addis Ababa.

Hintsa has studied business administration at Jyväskylä University, and has worked as a volunteer in Uganda.

Hintsa worked at Bianco Footwear as a store manager in Finland. Her father, Aki Hintsa, was a doctor for the McLaren F1 team. In April 2013, she revealed that she had been on good relations with Formula One driver Lewis Hamilton six years prior, but denied that the two had ever dated.

== Career ==
Hintsa was crowned Miss Finland 2013 during the annual event held at the Långvik Congress Wellness Hotel in Kirkkonummi on 5 May. Standing 1.68 m (5 ft 6 in) tall, Hintsa represented Finland during the 2013 Miss Universe pageant on 9 November.

In autumn 2018, Näkyvä competed in Tanssii tähtien kanssa, the Finnish version of the British TV dance contest Strictly Come Dancing. In 2023, Hintsa competed on Amazing Race Suomi with her sister Noora but the two left in the third episode after experiencing medical problems.

== Personal life ==
Hintsa married ice hockey player Kristian Näkyvä in 2016, taking his last name; the couple announced their divorce in 2019. Hintsa was in a relationship with Canadian mountain climber Don Bowie from 2021 to 2023.

In May 2024, Hintsa, along with American doctor April Leonardo, was one of two women who accused the mountaineer Nirmal Purja of sexual harassment and assault. Purja allegedly sexually assaulted Hintsa in a hotel suite in Kathmandu, Nepal, in March 2023. The incident was exposed in a New York Times article detailing the allegations.

Awards and achievements
Preceded by Sara Chafak	Miss Finland; 2013	Succeeded by Bea Toivonen
