= Rosa-Maria Ryyti =

Finnish beauty pageant contestant (born 1994)

- Born: Rosa-Maria Ryyti; 13 June 1994 (age 32); Oulu, Finland
- Height: 1.78 m (5 ft 10 in)
- Beauty pageant titleholder
- Title: Miss Finland 2015
- Hair color: Blond
- Eye color: Green
- Major competition: Miss Universe 2015 (unplaced)

Rosa-Maria Ryyti (born 13 June 1994) is a Finnish designer, model and beauty pageant titleholder who was crowned Miss Finland 2015 and represented Finland at the Miss Universe 2015 pageant.

== Personal life ==
Ryyti graduated with a degree in Interior Design and currently works as an interior designer in Finland.

=== Miss Finland 2015 ===
On 12 April 2015, Ryyti was crowned Miss Finland 2015 in Helsinki. She was also automatically crowned as Miss Universe Finland.

=== Miss Universe 2015 ===
Ryyti represented Finland at the Miss Universe 2015 pageant on December 20, 2015, in Las Vegas, United States, but failed to place in the Top 15.

Awards and achievements
Preceded by Bea Toivonen	Miss Finland; 2015	Succeeded by Shirly Karvinen
