= Shirly Karvinen =

Finnish model and beauty pageant titleholder

- Born: 3 September 1992 (age 34); Jyväskylä, Finland
- Height: 1.70 m (5 ft 7 in)
- Beauty pageant titleholder
- Title: Miss Finland 2016
- Hair color: Black
- Eye color: Hazel
- Major competitions: Miss Finland 2016 (Winner); Miss Universe 2016 (Unplaced)

Shirly Karvinen (born 3 September 1992) is a Finnish model and beauty pageant titleholder. She was crowned Miss Finland 2016 and represented her country at Miss Universe 2016.

== Background ==
Karvinen was born to a Finnish father and a Chinese mother in Finland. Due to her father's work in an asphalt paving company, she spent her early childhood living in Zambia, Kenya, Tanzania, and Saudi Arabia. In her teens, she also lived in Beijing as an exchange student, while spending time with her mother's side of the family.

Karvinen speaks Finnish and English. She also knows the basics of Mandarin Chinese.

== Education and career ==
Karvinen has most recently studied in the Bachelor of Business Administration program at Haaga-Helia University of Applied Sciences in Helsinki. As part of her studies, she also worked as an administrative assistant in the Ministry for Foreign Affairs in Helsinki and the Embassy of Finland in Washington, D.C.

== Pageantry ==
=== Miss Finland 2016 ===
Karvinen was crowned Miss Finland 2016 at Vanajanlinna Castle in Hämeenlinna on May 13, 2016.

As Miss Finland, Karvinen wanted to be a good role model for others to look up to. Among her other causes, Karvinen has supported anti-bullying efforts and spoken against school bullying. According to her, she suffered from bullying in her childhood and youth for being half-Chinese.

=== Miss Universe 2016 ===
Karvinen represented Finland at Miss Universe 2016 but unplaced.

== Personal life ==
Karvinen and her former girlfriend, Finnish pop singer Sanni, live in Helsinki. They separated in 2025.

Awards and achievements
Preceded by Rosa-Maria Ryyti	Miss Finland; 2016	Succeeded by Michaela Söderholm
