= Inga-Britt Söderberg =

Finnish model (1935–2019)

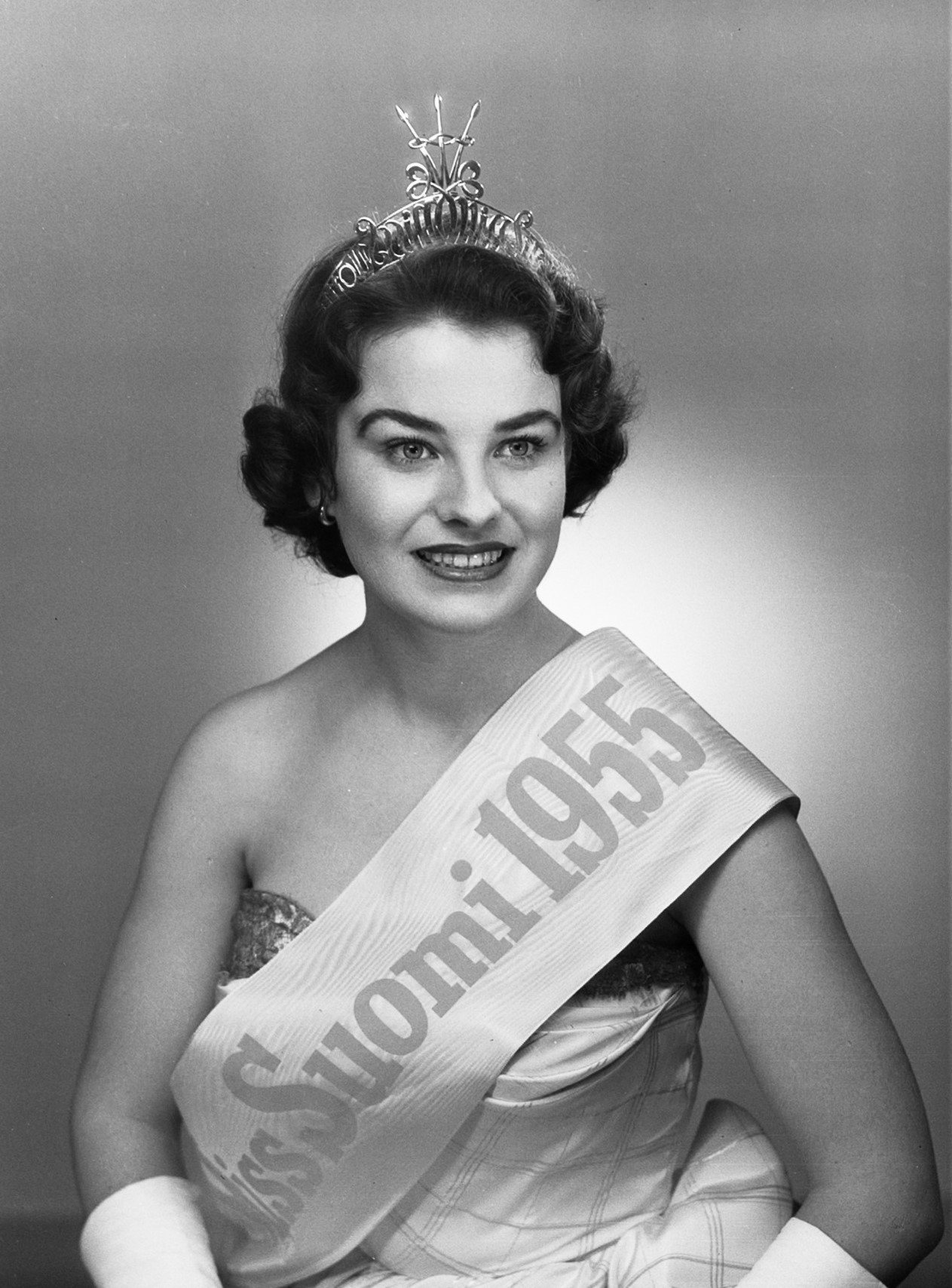
- Born: 2 February 1935; Helsinki, Finland
- Died: 15 February 2019 (aged 84); Fredericton, New Brunswick, Canada
- Occupations: Model, Sheep farmer
- Children: 2
- Beauty pageant titleholder
- No. of films: 1
- Major competitions: Miss Finland 1955; Miss Europe 1955

Inga-Britt Söderberg (2 February 1935 – 15 February 2019) was a Finnish model, and the 1955 Miss Finland and Miss Europe.

In 1956, Söderberg married a Canadian diplomat, Donald D. Cliffe, and two years later the couple moved to Canada, where they had two daughters.

Prior to her beauty pageant victories, Söderberg had worked as a post office clerk. Afterwards she began modelling, which continued until the early 1970s, as well as appearing in at least one film.

Later still, she switched to sheep farming, running her 400-sheep farm in Ontario for 30 years from 1971 to 2001.

She died in 2019 in a care home in Fredericton, New Brunswick. She had been diagnosed with breast cancer just a few days earlier.
