= Miss Europe 1955 =

International beauty pageant

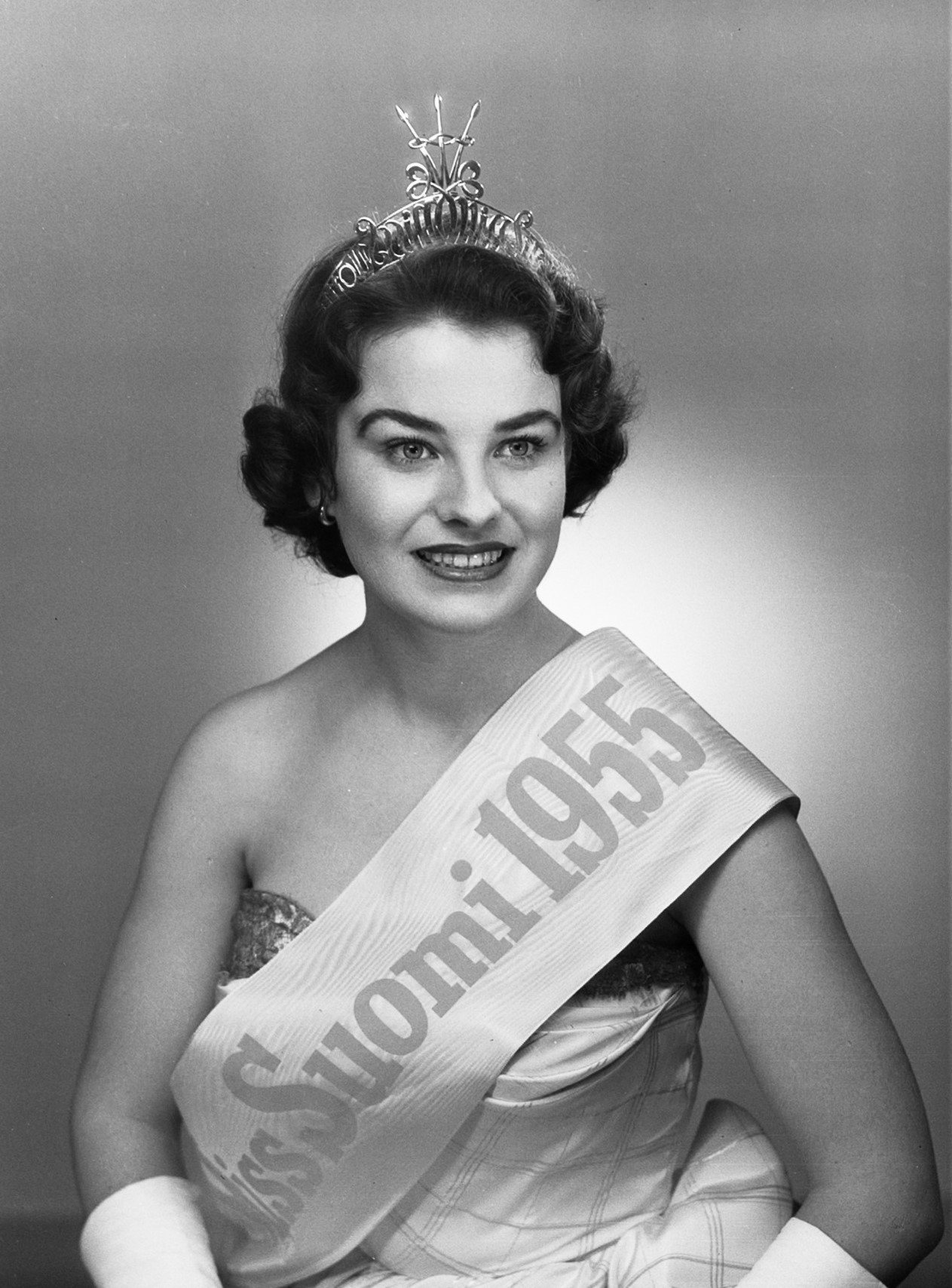
- Inga-Britt Söderberg
- Date: 11 June 1955
- Venue: Helsinki, Finland
- Entrants: 13
- Placements: 5
- Withdrawals: Ireland; Poland
- Returns: Denmark; Turkey
- Winner: Inga-Britt Söderberg; Finland

Miss Europe 1955 was the 18th edition of the Miss Europe pageant, held in Helsinki, Finland on 11 June 1955. At the end of the event, Danielle Génault of France crowned Inga-Britt Söderberg of Finland as Miss Europe 1955.

Contestants from thirteen countries competed in this year's pageant. Finnish long-distance runner Paavo Nurmi announced the results.

== Results ==
=== Placements ===
Placement	Contestant
Miss Europe 1955	Finland – Inga-Britt Söderberg
1st runner-up	Turkey – Suna Soley
2nd runner-up	France – Monique Lambert
3rd runner-up	Greece – Depi Martini
4th runner-up	England – Margaret Rowe

== Contestants ==
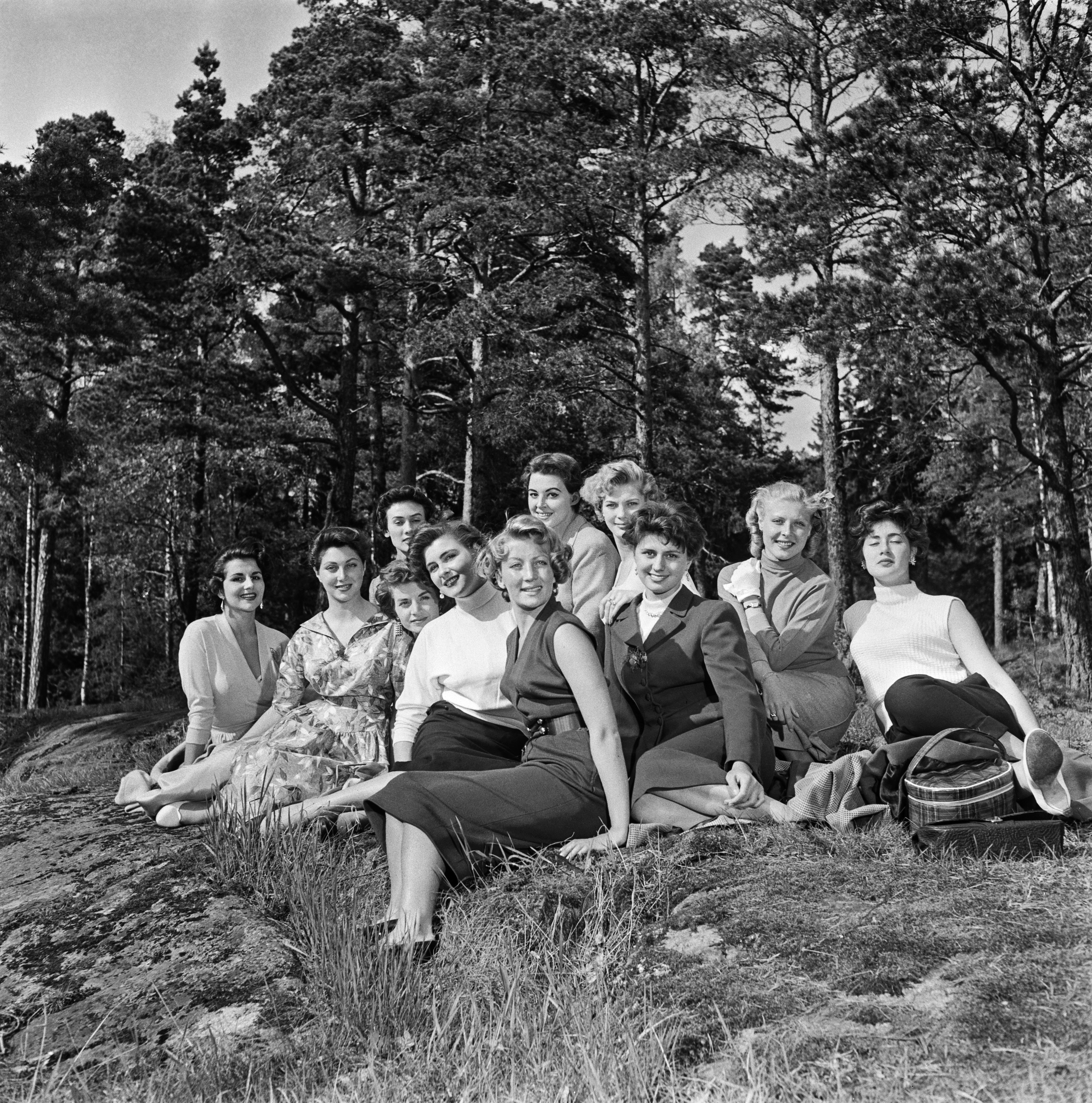
Contestants of Miss Europe 1955.

=== Selection of participants ===
Contestants from thirteen countries competed in this edition. This edition saw the returns of Denmark and Turkey, and the withdrawals of Ireland and Poland. Merle McCarley of Ireland was not allowed to compete as she was from Northern Ireland. A candidate from Norway was also expected to compete, but withdrew due to an illness.

=== List of contestants ===
Thirteen contestants competed for the title.

Country/Territory	Contestant	Age (Note: Ages at the time of the pageant)	Hometown
Austria	Edith Philipp	–	Vienna
Belgium	Madeleine Lamal	–	Brussels
Denmark	Karin Palm-Rasmussen	18	Copenhagen
England	Margaret Rowe	19	London
Finland	Inga-Britt Söderberg	20	Helsinki
France	Monique Lambert	18	Paris
Greece	Depi Martini	18	Athens
Holland	Angelina Kalkhoven	18	Amsterdam
Italy	Wandisa Guida	20	Trani
Sweden	Hillevi Larsson	–	Stockholm
Switzerland	Claude Ivry	23	Zurich
Turkey	Suna Soley	18	Istanbul
West Germany	Sonja Dahnk	–	–
