= Sara Chafak =

Finnish beauty pageant winner

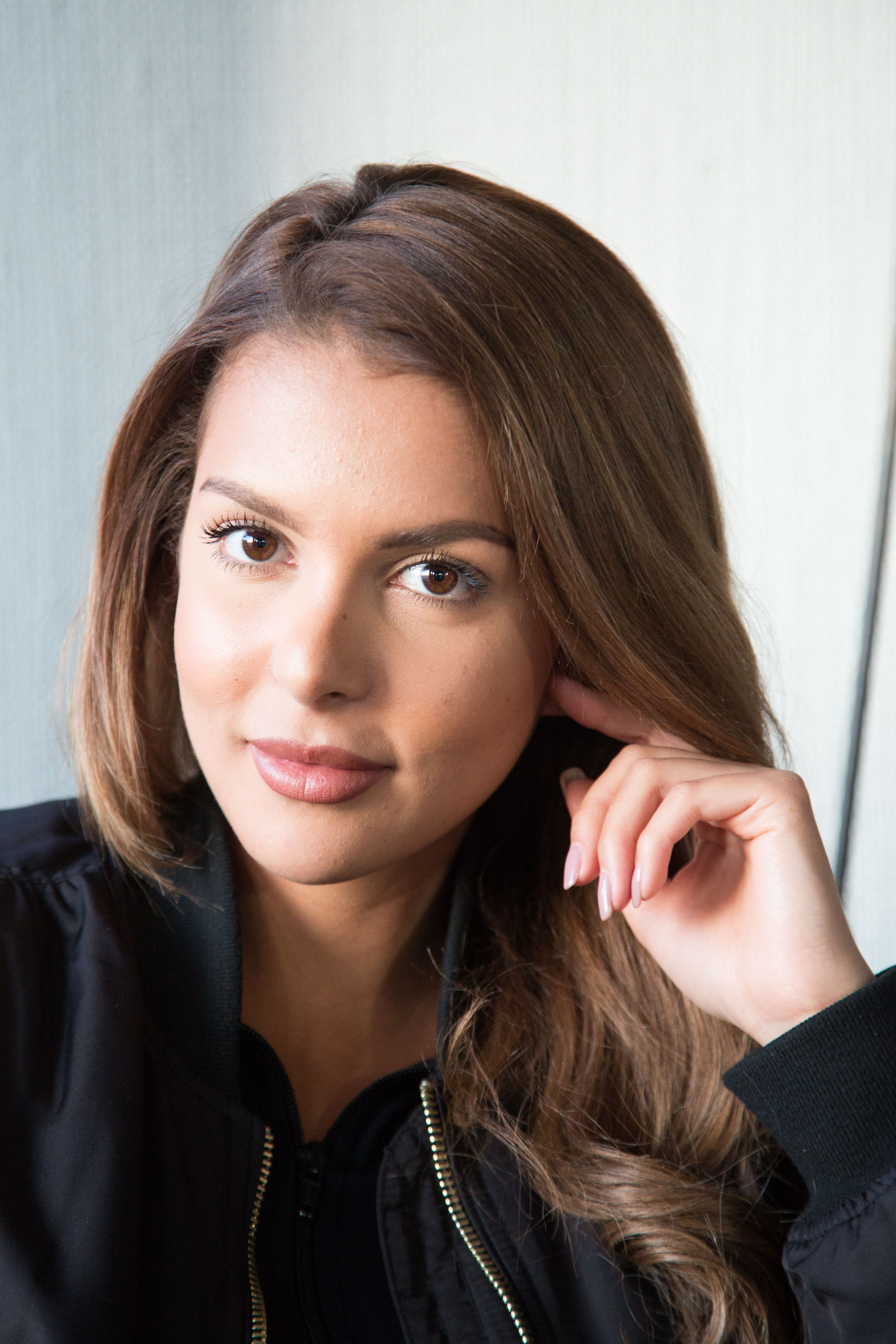
- Sara Chafak in 2016
- Born: Sara Yasmina Chafak; 25 October 1990 (age 35); Helsinki, Finland
- Height: 1.72 m (5 ft 7 1/2 in)
- Beauty pageant titleholder
- Title: Miss Finland 2012
- Hair color: Dark Brown
- Major competitions: Miss Finland 2012 (Winner); Miss Universe 2012 (Unplaced)

Sara Chafak (born 25 October 1990) is a Finnish beauty pageant titleholder who was crowned Miss Finland 2012 and represented Finland in Miss Universe 2012.

== Pageants ==
=== Miss Finland 2012 ===
Chafak was crowned Miss Suomi 2012 (Miss Finland 2012) at the Vanajanlinna Castle in Hämeenlinna in southern Finland on 29 January 2012.

=== Miss Universe 2012 ===
Chafak participated in the 61st edition of the Miss Universe pageant. She competed to succeed outgoing titleholder Leila Lopes from Angola.

== Other ==
In autumn 2013 Chafak participated in the Finnish version of Dancing on Ice where ten celebrities (Sauli Koskinen among others) learned to ice skate with a professional partner. She was partnered with ice dancer Sasha Palomäki and they placed third in the final standings. In July 2014 Chafak made her debut as a rap artist on a JVG music video. In late 2014, Chafak competed in a poker tournament, bluffing poker pro Ronnie Bardah on the PokerStars-produced show Shark Cage. A clip of the bluff went viral.

Awards and achievements
Preceded by Pia Pakarinen	Miss Finland; 2012	Succeeded by Lotta Hintsa
