= Pia Lamberg =

Finnish actress, model and beauty pageant titleholder (born 1990)

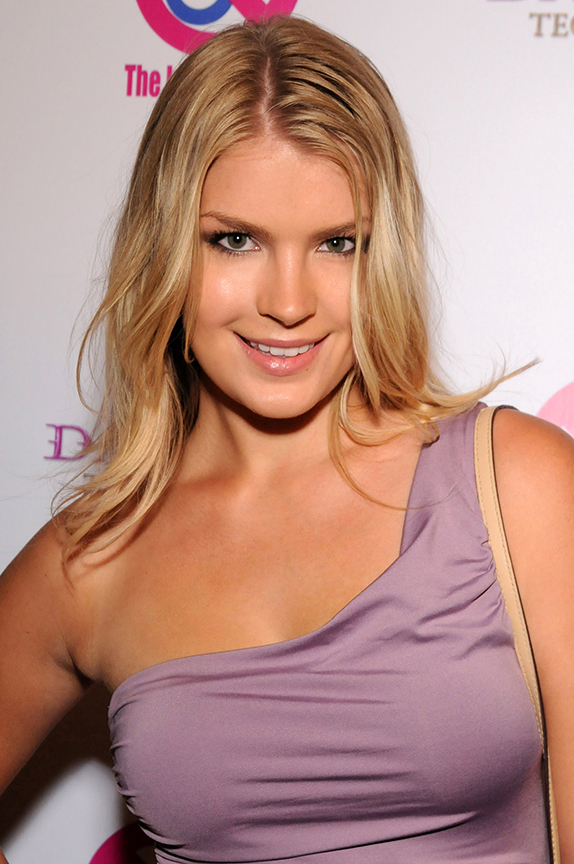
- Pia Lamberg in Los Angeles, California on January 7, 2014.
- Born: Pia Pakarinen; 5 October 1990 (age 36); Juuka, Finland
- Occupations: Actress, fashion model and beauty pageant titleholder
- Height: 1.73 m (5 ft 8 in)
- Beauty pageant titleholder
- Title: Miss Finland 2011
- Hair color: Blonde
- Major competitions: Miss Finland 2011 (Winner); Miss Universe 2011 (Unplaced)

Pia Lamberg (née Pakarinen; born 5 October 1990) is a Finnish actress, fashion model and beauty pageant titleholder. She was crowned Miss Finland 2011 and represented Finland at Miss Universe 2011 pageant on September 12, 2011 in Brazil.

== Life and career ==
Pia Pakarinen was born on 5 October 1990 in Juuka, Finland. She changed her surname to her mother's maiden name Lamberg when she moved to the United States in the early 2010s.

She competed as one of the 10 finalists in Finland's national beauty pageant, Miss Finland 2011 broadcast live by MTV3 on 5 March 2011. She became the eventual winner of the title, gaining the right to represent Finland in the 2011 Miss Universe pageant, to be broadcast live from São Paulo, Brazil on 12 September 2011. Pakarinen resigned from the duties of Miss Finland on national TV broadcast on 16 September 2011. This was due to differences of opinions with Finnartist Oy and especially Eino Makunen. She felt she was left all alone and wasn't supported in a professional manner. After her decision Eino Makunen announced that the new Miss Finland 2011 was Sara Sieppi.

Lamberg subsequently moved to Los Angeles to pursue a career in acting and modeling. In 2015, she signed a modeling contract with NTA Model Management in Los Angeles. Lamberg has modeled for numerous brands such as Corona, Nike, Adidas, John Frieda, Ole Henriksen, Mineral Air and Paula's Choice. She has been featured in commercials for Mercedes-Benz, Booking, Quiznos and Dave & Buster's.

In 2013, Lamberg was cast as lifeguard Heather in The CW's action-drama television series SAF3. The series followed the daily challenges of the multi-agency task force known as SAF3, which includes lifeguards, firefighters and Coast Guard officers. She was a Trophy Model at the 54th Annual Grammy Awards (2012) and the 61st Annual Grammy Awards (2019), which aired on CBS. She had small roles in television shows such as Kingdom (2014) and Tosh.0 (2018), and appeared as a model in The Queen Latifah Show (2014).

== Filmography ==
Film and television roles
Year	Title	Role	Notes
2011	Miss Finland 2011	Herself	Television special
2012	54th Annual Grammy Awards	Herself	Trophy Model; Television special
2012	The Real Housewives of Beverly Hills	Herself	Uncredited; Episode: "Down and Left Out in Beverly Hills"
2013	Racing to the Altar	Gina	Short film
2013	The Ladies Room	Ring Girl	Short film
2013	Featured by Fameus	Herself	Host; 6 episodes
2013–14	SAF3	Heather	10 episodes
2014	Kingdom	Actress	Episode: "Glass Eye"
2014	The Queen Latifah Show	Herself	Model; Episode: "Halle Berry!"
2015	Italian Kiss	Young Woman	Short film
2016	Rope Trick	Shye	Short film
2018	Tosh.0	Hiker	Episode: "Bear Attack"
2019	61st Annual Grammy Awards	Herself	Trophy Model; Television special
2020	Warmed-Over Krautrock	Even More Improbably Hot Girl	Film

Awards and achievements
Preceded by Viivi Pumpanen	Miss Finland; 2011	Succeeded by Sara Chafak
