= Lola Odusoga =

Finnish model (born 1977)

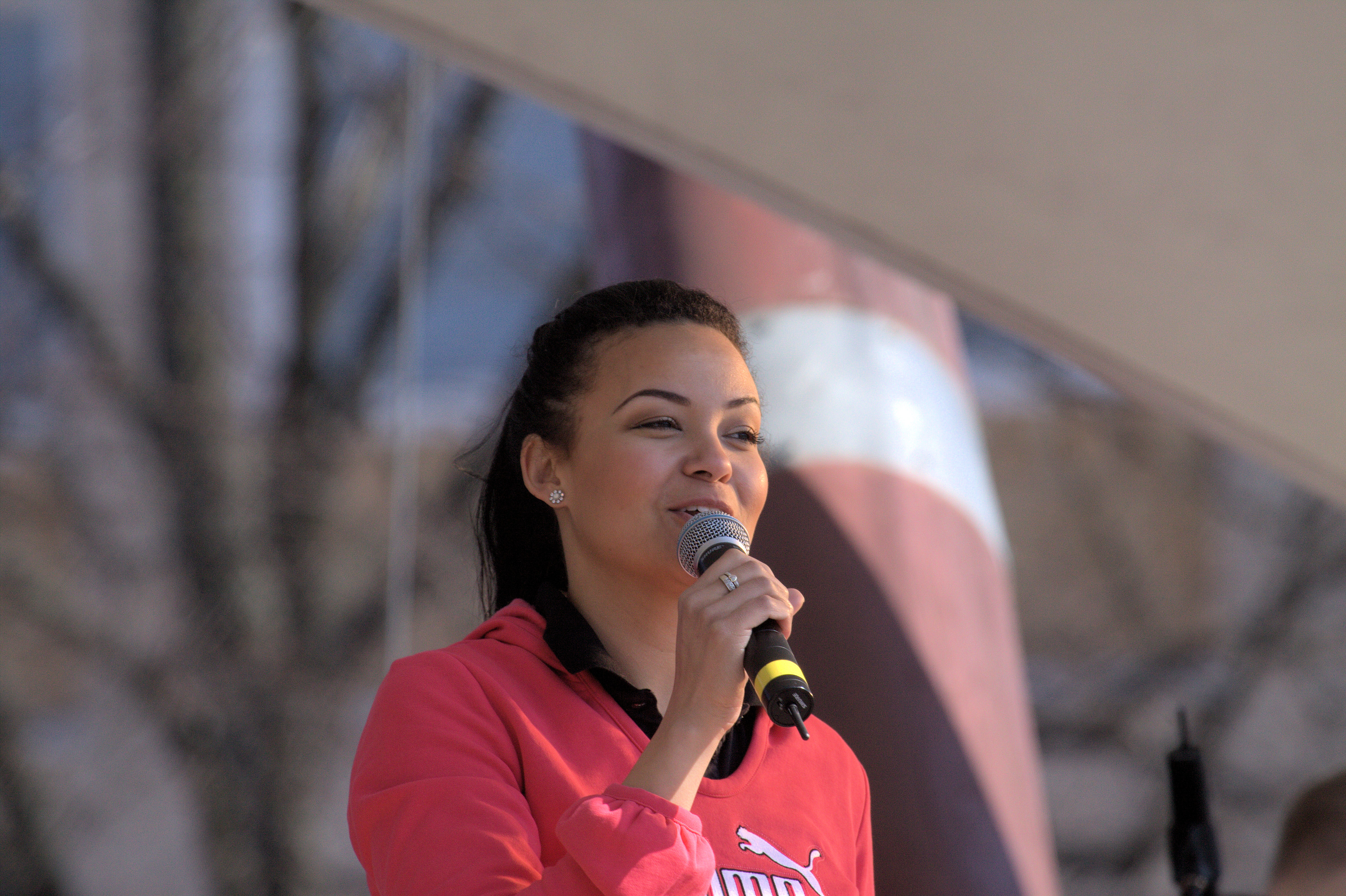
Odusoga in 2009

Iyabode Ololade Remilekun "Lola" Odusoga (previously Wallinkoski; born 30 June 1977 in Turku) is a Finnish model and beauty pageant titleholder who won the Miss Finland contest in 1996. In 1997, she won the crown of Miss Scandinavia. On 17 June 1996 at the Miss Universe competition in Las Vegas, she was second-runner up. Her mother is Finnish and her father is Yoruba from Nigeria.

She is also an actress, known for Vares: Tango of Darkness (2012), Hilander-TV (2010) and 3 asiaa: Petri Nygård (2013).

In 2000, Odusoga sparked a public debate over her silicon breast implants.

Odusoga married Jarkko Wallinkoski on 12 August 2005. They have two children together: a daughter (born 2004) and a son (born 2006). After the couple divorced in 2015, she changed her last name back to her partial maiden name.

Awards and achievements
Preceded by Heli Pirhonen	Miss Finland; 1996	Succeeded by Karita Tuomola
