= Eva-Lena Lundgren =

Swedish beauty pageant contestant (born 1961)

- Born: 1961 (age 64–65)
- Children: 3
- Beauty pageant titleholder
- Title: Miss Sweden 1981; Miss Scandinavia 1981
- Hair color: Blonde
- Major competitions: Miss Sweden 1981 (winner); Miss Universe 1981 (2nd runner-up); Miss Scandinavia 1981 (winner); Miss Europe (fourth place)

Eva-Lena Lundgren (born 1961) is a Swedish model and beauty pageant titleholder who was crowned Miss Sweden 1981. Later in 1981, she finished in third place at the Miss Universe 1981 pageant and fourth place at Miss Europe. Lundgren was awarded the Miss Scandinavia crown the same year in Helsinki, Finland.

She later became Eva-Lena Pilotti. As of 2007, she was a Montessori Latin and Greek teacher in Amsterdam, Netherlands, and had three children.

Awards and achievements
| Preceded by Eva Birgitta Andersson | Miss Sweden (Fröken Sverige); 1981 | Succeeded by Anna-Kari Bergström |
