= Miss Scandinavia =

Nordic beauty contest

Miss Scandinavia is a beauty pageant for women from the Nordic countries. The contest was merged with the Miss Baltic Sea pageant for the years 2007 and 2008 and after that the merged pageant was also discontinued.

It was sponsored by MTV3.

After a hiatus between 2009 and 2020, the Miss Scandinavia pageant returned in 2021 with new organizers under the Miss Scandinavia Organization.

== Titleholders ==
Year	Miss Scandinavia Titleholder	Comments	Ref.
Miss Scandinavia
2021	Moa Sandberg; Sweden		
No pageant between 2009—2020.
Miss Scandinavia and Miss Baltic Sea
2008	Fanney Lára Guðmundsdóttir; Iceland	Miss Scandinavia & Miss Baltic Sea	
2007	Dorota Gawron; Poland	Miss Scandinavia & Miss Baltic Sea	
Miss Scandinavia
2006	No pageant in 2006.		
2005	Gitte Hanspal; Denmark		
2004	Piritta Hannula; Finland		
2003	Marna Haugen; Norway		
2002	Íris Björk Árnadóttir; Iceland	Semi-finalist Miss Europe 01	
2001	Jenni Maria Dahlman; Finland		
2000	Saija Palin; Finland	2nd Runner-Up Miss International 99	
1999	Jonna Kauppila; Finland		
1998	Dagmar Íris Gylfadóttir; Iceland		
1997	Lola Iyabode Odusoga; Finland	2nd Runner-Up Miss Universe 96	
1996	Sandra Hjort; Sweden		
1995	Birna Bragadóttir; Iceland		
1994	Beatrice Magnusson; Sweden		
1993	Thorunn Larusdóttir; Iceland	Semi-finalist Miss International 92	
1992	Nina Autio; Finland		
1991	Nina Björkfelt; Finland	3rd Runner-Up Miss World 90	
1990	Louise Drevenstam; Sweden	1st Runner-Up Miss Universe 89	
1989	Helle Hansen; Norway		
1988	Maria Valtonen; Finland		
1987	Hege Rasmussen; Norway		
1986	Sif Sigfúsdóttir; Iceland		
No pageant between 1982—1985.
1981	Eva-Lena Lundgren; Sweden	3rd Runner-Up Miss Europe 81, 2nd Runner-Up Miss Universe 81	
1980	Mona Olsen; Denmark	Semi-finalist Miss Universe 81	
1979	Käte Nyberg; Finland	3rd Runner-Up Miss International 79	
1978	Susanne Olsson; Sweden		
1977	Birgitta Lindwall; Sweden		
1976	Bente Lihaug; Norway	Semi-finalist Miss Universe 76	
1975	No pageant in 1975.		
1974	Lena Olin; Sweden		
1973	Monica Sundin; Sweden		
1972	Tuula Anneli Björkling; Finland	5th Runner-Up Miss World 72, Winner Miss International 73	
1971	Eila Kivistö; Finland		
1970	Kristina Wayborn; Sweden	Semi-finalist Miss Universe 70	
1969	Harriet Marita Eriksson; Finland	3rd Runner-Up Miss Europe 69, 1st Runner-Up Miss Universe 69	
1968	Tone Knaran; Norway	Semi-finalist Miss Universe 68, 4th Runner-Up Miss Europe 68	
1967	Eva Englander; Sweden	Semi-finalist Miss Universe 67	
1966	Satu Charlotta Östring; Finland	1st Runner-Up Miss Universe 66, 1st Runner-Up Miss International 69	
1965	Elsa Brun; Norway		
1964	Birgitta Elisabeth Alverljung; Sweden	Semi-finalist Miss International 64	
1963	Thelma Ingvarsdóttir; Iceland		
1962	Kaarina Marita Leskinen; Finland	2nd Runner-Up Miss Europe 62, 1st Runner-Up Miss World 62	
Miss Norden
1961	Rigmor Trengereid; Norway		

=== Winners by countries and territories ===
Country/Territory	Titles	Year(s)
Finland	14	1962, 1966, 1969, 1971, 1972, 1979, 1988, 1991, 1992, 1997, 1999, 2000, 2001, 2004
Sweden	11	1964, 1967, 1970, 1973, 1974, 1977, 1978, 1981, 1990, 1994, 1996
Norway	7	1961, 1965, 1968, 1976, 1987, 1989, 2003
Iceland	6	1963, 1993, 1995, 1998, 2002, 2008
Denmark	2	1980, 2005
Poland	1	2007

== Hosts ==
Year	Hosts (s)
1963	Jaakko Jahnukainen and Jutta Zilliacus
1964	Carl-Erik Creutz and Lenita Airisto
1965	Carl-Erik Creutz and Liisa Tähkä
1966	Hugo Ahlberg and Lenita Airisto
1967	Hugo Ahlberg and Tuula Ignatius
1971	Voitto Kotilainen

== See also ==
- Miss Denmark, Face of Denmark, Miss World Denmark
- Suomen Neito, Miss Finland
- Miss Iceland, Miss World Iceland
- Miss Norway
- Miss Sweden, Miss World Sweden
- Miss Europe
