= Alina Voronkova =

Finnish model and beauty pageant titleholder

- Born: Alina Voronkova; 13 December 1994 (age 31); Lahti, Finland
- Education: University of Helsinki
- Height: 1.70 m (5 ft 7 in)
- Beauty pageant titleholder
- Title: Miss Finland 2018
- Hair color: Blonde
- Eye color: Green
- Major competitions: Miss Finland 2018 (Winner); Miss Universe 2018 (Unplaced)

Alina Voronkova (born 13 December 1994) is a Finnish model and beauty pageant titleholder who was crowned Miss Finland 2018. She represented Finland at the Miss Universe 2018 pageant in Bangkok, Thailand.

== Early life ==
Voronkova was born in Lahti to a Russian father Dmitry Voronkov, and an Ingrian Finn mother Svetlana Voronkova, who had both moved to Finland from Russia in the early 1990s. She grew up in Pertunmaa, and is bilingual, speaking both Finnish and Russian; the latter she and her family spoke at home. Voronkova attended the University of Helsinki.

== Pageantry ==
=== Miss Finland 2018 ===
On 29 September 2018, Voronkova competed in Miss Finland 2018 at the Billnäs Village, where she was crowned the 2018 Miss Universe Finland 2018. She succeeded outgoing titleholder Michaela Söderholm.

=== Miss Universe 2018 ===
As Miss Finland, Voronkova represented her country at the 2018 Miss Universe pageant in Bangkok, Thailand where she did not make the Top 20.

Awards and achievements
Preceded by Michaela Söderholm	Miss Finland; 2018	Succeeded by Anni Harjunpää
