= Paula Joukanen =

Finnish beauty pageant winner and model (born 2001)

- Born: Paula Susanna Joukanen; 19 March 2001 (age 25); Moscow, Russia
- Occupations: Model, law student
- Height: 1.75 m (5 ft 9 in)
- Beauty pageant titleholder
- Title: Miss Universe Finland 2023
- Major competitions: Miss Universe Finland 2023 (Winner); Miss Universe 2023 (Unplaced)

Paula Susanna Joukanen (born 19 March 2001) is a Finnish model and beauty pageant titleholder who was crowned Miss Universe Finland 2023 and represented her country at Miss Universe 2023.

== Early life ==
Joukanen was born in Moscow, Russia, to a Russian mother and a Finnish father. She moved to Finland when she was four months old. Joukanen holds dual citizenship in Russia and Finland. She has also lived in Italy.

== Pageantry ==
=== Miss Universe 2023 ===
Joukanen represented Finland at the 72nd Miss Universe competition held in El Salvador on 18 November 2023, but did not reach the top 20.

Awards and achievements
Preceded by Petra Hämäläinen	Miss Universe Finland; 2023	Succeeded by Matilda Wirtavuori
