= Miss Baltic Sea 1991 =

- Date: December 17, 1990
- Entrants: 9
- Placements: 3
- Winner: Nina Andersson; Finland

Miss Baltic Sea 1991 is the first annual Miss Baltic Sea. Countries from the Baltic Sea has competed a pageant and only 9 contestants. Miss Finland has won.

== Placements ==
Final results	Contestant
Miss Baltic Sea 1991	Finland - Nina Andersson
1st runner-up	Russia - Olga Fedorova
2nd runner-up	Poland - Ewa Szymczak

== Contestants ==
- Finland - Nina Andersson
- Germany - Ilka Endres
- Poland - Ewa Szymczak
- Russia - Olga Fedorova
