= Bea Toivonen =

Finnish beauty pageant contestant (born 1992)

- Born: Bea Toivonen; 28 October 1992 (age 33); Jyväskylä, Finland
- Height: 1.80 m (5 ft 11 in)
- Beauty pageant titleholder
- Title: Miss Finland 2014
- Hair colour: Blonde
- Eye colour: Blue
- Major competitions: Miss Finland 2014 (Winner); Miss Universe 2014 (unplaced)

Bea Toivonen (born 28 October 1992) is a Finnish model and beauty pageant titleholder who was crowned Miss Finland 2014 and represented Finland at the Miss Universe 2014 pageant.

== Personal life ==
Toivonen was born in 1992. Her mother, Marja Kinnunen, is a former Miss Suomi and represented Finland at Miss Universe 1985. Toivonen is a hairdresser and make-up artist. Bea's father Harri Toivonen is a former rally driver. Her uncle was Henri Toivonen who was also a rally driver.

She has an older sister and her mother and father divorced in 2011.

== Pageantry ==
=== Miss Finland 2014 ===
Toivonen represented Jyväskylä and was crowned Miss Finland 2014 on 4 May 2014 at a ceremony held at Langvik Congress Wellness Hotel in Kirkkonummi. The pageant was broadcast live on national television and received extensive coverage in the tabloid press.

=== Miss Universe 2014 ===
Toivonen competed at the Miss Universe 2014 but was unplaced.

Awards and achievements
Preceded by Lotta Hintsa	Miss Finland; 2014	Succeeded by Rosa-Maria Ryyti
