= Marita Lindahl =

Finnish model and Miss World 1957 (1938–2017)

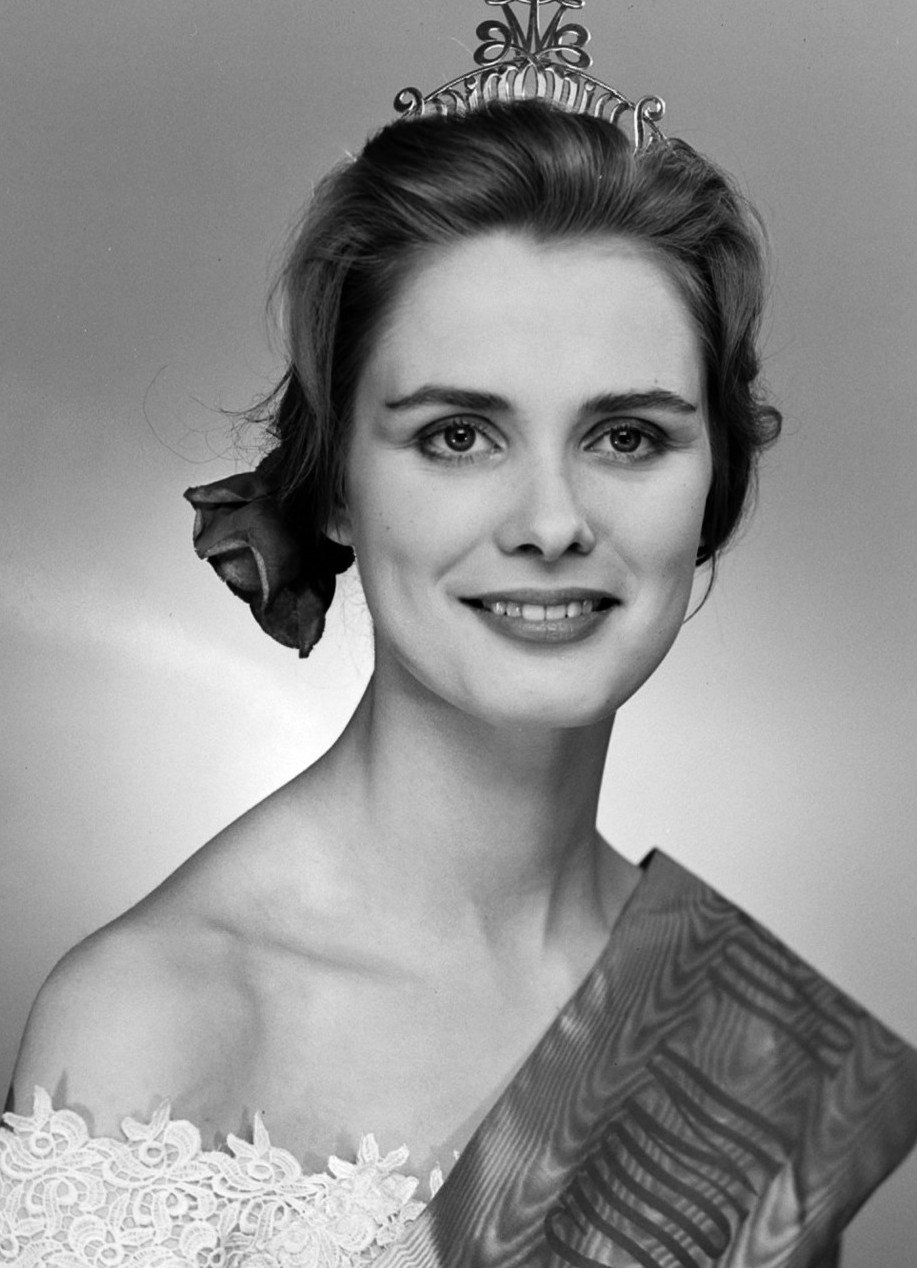
- Born: 7 October 1938; Helsinki, Finland
- Died: 21 March 2017 (aged 78)
- Occupations: Model, entrepreneur
- Beauty pageant titleholder
- Years active: 1957–2017
- Major competitions: Miss Suomi 1957 (Winner) (Miss Photogenic); Miss World 1957 (Winner)

Marita Lindahl (17 October 1938 – 21 March 2017) was a Finnish model and beauty queen who won Miss World 1957, after being crowned Miss Finland 1957 by Miss Finland 1956, Sirpa Helena Koivu. She became the first woman from Finland to win the title and the third Nordic woman; after Sweden had won the two first contests.

The pageant was held in London, England. Lindahl was described by pageant director Eric Morley as having "the haunting beauty and intrigue of a Greta Garbo". The first runner-up was Lilian Madsen from Denmark, second runner-up Adele Kruger from South Africa and third runner-up Jacqueline Tapia from Tunisia.

Lindahl ran one of the most popular restaurants in Helsinki. Later she moved to England. She lived in Oxford.

Lindahl died on March 21, 2017, of a heart attack at the age of 78.

Awards and achievements
Preceded by (West Germany) Petra Schürmann	Miss World; 1957	Succeeded by (South Africa) Penelope Coelen
