= Noora Hautakangas =

Finnish model (born 1984)

Noora Hautakangas (born 22 March 1984, in Soini) is a Finnish model and beauty pageant titleholder who won Miss Finland 2007 and was Finland's representative in Miss Universe 2007. She studied for a degree in prosthetics and orthotics at Helsinki Polytechnic Stadia.

Since 2016, she has been an entrepreneur, owning three second-hand goods stores in Helsinki.

Awards and achievements
Preceded by Ninni Laaksonen	Miss Finland; 2007	Succeeded by Satu Tuomisto
