= Viivi Pumpanen =

Finnish beauty pageant titleholder (born 1988)

- Born: Viivi Pumpanen; 20 July 1988 (age 38); Vantaa, Finland
- Height: 1.69 m (5 ft 6 1/2 in)
- Beauty pageant titleholder
- Title: Miss Finland 2010
- Hair color: Brown
- Eye color: Brown
- Major competitions: Miss Universe 2010 (Unplaced)

Viivi Pumpanen (born 20 July 1988) is a Finnish actress, model and beauty pageant titleholder who was crowned Miss Finland 2010, and represented Finland at the 2010 Miss Universe pageant.

== Early life ==
Viivi Pumpanen was born on 20 July 1988 in Vantaa, Finland. She graduated from Vaskivuoren lukio in 2008.

== Career ==
Pumpanen was chosen as the winner of Miss Helsinki beauty pageant in 2009. She then competed in Miss Finland 2010 pageant and won. As the 71st Miss Finland, Pumpanen accepted the crown from Essi Pöysti, the 2009 titleholder, on 17 January 2010 and said "I have been dreaming about this since I was eight years old. My mother and father have been supporting me."

She competed in the Miss Universe 2010 beauty pageant on 23 August 2010 in Las Vegas, Nevada.

In 2011, Pumpanen won television dance competition Tanssii tähtien kanssa, the Finnish version of the British dance show Strictly Come Dancing. Her professional partner was Matti Puro. In 2018, she signed a record deal with FinRecords and has released five standalone singles as of 2021.

On 11 December 2023, she was revealed as one of the hosts of Uuden Musiikin Kilpailu 2024, the Finnish selection for the Eurovision Song Contest 2024, alongside Pilvi Hämäläinen and Benjamin Peltonen.

Between 2024 and 2025 she played a sapphic character Kikka Granberg on a Finnish soap opera Salatut elämät for a total of 20 episodes.

== Discography ==
=== Singles ===
| Year | Title | Album |
|---|---|---|
| 2018 | "Elämännälkäinen" | Non-album single |
| 2019 | "Sun kaltainen" | Non-album single |
| 2019 | "Maailmanpyörä" | Non-album single |
| 2020 | "Lahja" | Non-album single |
| 2021 | "Ihmeidentekijä" | Non-album single |

== Filmography ==
Film and television
| Year | Title | Role | Notes |
|---|---|---|---|
| 2013 | Kerran viikossa | Waitress | Episode: "Ensisilmäyksellä" |
| 2015 | Voitolla yöhön | Herself | 11 episodes |
| 2015–2022 | Posse | Herself | Host; 75 episodes |
| 2016 | Saturday Night Live | Various roles | Episode: "Viivi Pumpanen" |
| 2020 | Masked Singer Suomi | Herself / Chicken | Contestant; 4 episodes |
| 2021 | Reunion 3: Singles Cruise | Risteilyemäntä | Film; Finnish title: Luokkakokous 3 – Sinkkuristeily |
| 2022 | Harjunpää | Sanna Lehikoinen | 2 episodes |
| 2022 | Free Skate | Mother | Film |
| 2024–2025 | Salatut elämät | Kikka Granberg | 20 episodes |

Awards and achievements
| Preceded by Essi Pöysti | Miss Finland; 2010 | Succeeded by Pia Pakarinen |
