= Ninni Laaksonen =

Finnish beauty pageant contestant

- Born: 9 January 1986 (age 40); Helsinki, Finland
- Beauty pageant titleholder
- Title: Miss Finland 2006
- Hair color: Blonde
- Major competitions: Miss Finland 2006 (Winner); Miss Universe 2006 (Unplaced)

Ninni Charlotta Laaksonen (born 9 January 1986 in Helsinki) is a Finnish model and beauty pageant titleholder who was crowned Miss Finland 2006 and represented her country at Miss Universe 2006. She presently runs a clothing and beauty products company called Ninnin Lifestyle & Living.

In October 2016, Laaksonen reported that she was groped by Donald Trump, becoming the 12th woman to openly accuse Trump of sexual assault. The incident occurred before her appearance on the Late Show with David Letterman in 2006.

Awards and achievements
Preceded by Hanna Ek	Miss Finland; 2006	Succeeded by Noora Hautakangas
