= Hanna Poulsen =

Finnish model (born 1984)

- Born: Hanna Ek; 9 February 1984 (age 42); Porvoo, Finland
- Beauty pageant titleholder
- Title: Miss Finland 2005
- Major competition: Miss Universe 2005

Hanna Poulsen (née Ek; born 9 February 1984 in Porvoo) is a Finnish model and beauty pageant titleholder who was crowned Miss Finland 2005 and represented her country at Miss Universe 2005 pageant.

She married restaurateur Henrik Poulsen in summer of 2012. They have two children.

== Sources ==
- Hanna Poulsen at IMDb
- handout showing Ek competing in Miss Universe pageant
- "published photo of Ek in gown". smh.com.au. Archived from the original on June 1, 2005.
- racist article about 2005 Miss Universe contestants
- mention of various Miss Universe contestants

Awards and achievements
Preceded by Mira Salo	Miss Finland; 2005	Succeeded by Ninni Laaksonen
