= Miss Finland =

Beauty pageant

Miss Suomi Organization
- Formation: 1931
- Type: Beauty pageant
- Headquarters: Helsinki
- Location: Finland
- Members: Miss Universe; Miss World; Miss International
- Official language: Finnish
- National Director: Sunneva Sjögrén
- Website: www.misssuomi.fi

Miss Suomi (Finnish for Miss Finland) is a national beauty pageant in Finland. The pageant was founded in 1931, where the winners were sent to Miss Universe.

== History ==
The Miss Suomi was held for the first time in 1931. Between 1952 and 1955 the winner of Suomen Neito went to Miss Universe, where Armi Kuusela was also crowned as the first Miss Universe in Long Beach by actress Piper Laurie in 1952.

In 1956, due to lack of sponsorship, the national pageant of Suomen Neito was not held, and it made Finland withdraw from the competition. In 1960, Finland returned to Miss Universe with the second runner-up of Miss Suomi 1960, Maija-Leena Manninen, representing the country.

In 1961, the Miss Suomi Organization changed its format to send its winner to the Miss Universe competition. From 1962 to 1963, the first princess of Miss Suomi represented Finland at Miss Universe.

In some years, an appointed candidate has represented her country in Miss World or Miss International.

From 1964, the winner of Miss Suomi has represented her country in the Miss Universe competition.

== Franchise holders ==
The Miss Suomi Organization owns the rights to produce three titleholders to the grand slam beauty pageants: Miss Universe, Miss World and Miss International. The winner automatically becomes Miss Universe Finland while runners-up are crowned as Miss World Finland and Miss International Finland. Before 2007, Miss Suomi Organization also sent a delegate to Miss Europe.

== Hosts ==
- Hugo Ahlberg – 1967
- Tauno Äijälä – 1968
- Teppo Ivaska – 1970
- Yvonne de Bruyn – 1973
- Helena Korhonen – 1980
- Sirpa Viljamaa – 1984
- Pirkko Mannola – 1986
- Lola Odusoga and Michaela Söderholm – 2019

== International winners ==
- Miss Universe
  - 1975 – Anne Pohtamo
  - 1952 – Armi Kuusela
- Miss World
  - 1957 – Marita Lindahl†
- Miss International
  - 1973 – Anneli Björkling

== Titleholders ==
Winning International Title
Miss Universe Finland
Miss World Finland
Miss International Finland
Miss Europe Finland

Year	Miss Suomi	1st Princess	2nd Princess	Miss International FIN.	Miss World FIN.
2025	~~Sarah Dzafce~~ (Note: Stripped of title.)	Tara Lehtonen	Julianna Kauhaniemi	Vera Eloranta	Sofia Singh
2024	Matilda Wirtavuori	Tiia Aalto	Amanda Hakalax	x	x
2023	Paula Joukanen	Serina Suvila	Maisa Alatalo	x	x
2022	Petra Hämäläinen	Nana Partanen	Adelaide Botty van den Bruele	x	x
2021	Essi Unkuri	Emmi Suuronen	Sonja Länsivuori	x	Emilia Lepomäki
2020	Viivi Altonen	Lauta Hautaniemi	Noona Pölkki	Anna Merimaa	Debuted 2021
2019	Anni Harjunpää	Jutta Kyllönen	Riikka Uusitalo; Did not compete	Debuted 2020	Debuted 2021
2018	Alina Voronkova	Eevi Ihalainen	Jenny Lappalainen	Debuted 2020	Debuted 2021
2017	Michaela Söderholm	Adriana Gerxhalija	Pihla Koivuniemi	Debuted 2020	Debuted 2021
2016	Shirly Karvinen	Heta Sallinen	Emilia Seppänen	Debuted 2020	Debuted 2021
2015	Rosa-Maria Ryyti	Carola Miller	Saara Ahlberg	Debuted 2020	Debuted 2021
2014	Bea Toivonen	Krista Haapalainen	Milla Romppanen	Debuted 2020	Debuted 2021
2013	Lotta Hintsa	Maija Kerisalmi	Helianna Ylimaula	Debuted 2020	Debuted 2021
2012	Sara Chafak	Sabina Särkkä	Viivi Suominen	Debuted 2020	Debuted 2021
2011	Pia Pakarinen; Resigned	Sara Sieppi	Niina Lavonen	Debuted 2020	Debuted 2021
2010	Viivi Pumpanen	Anne Nurminen	Susanna Turja	Debuted 2020	Debuted 2021
2009	Essi Pöysti	Elsi Suolanen; Did not compete	Linda Wikstedt	Debuted 2020	Debuted 2021
2008	Satu Tuomisto	Susanna Mustajarvi; Did not compete	Janna Tannilla	Debuted 2020	Debuted 2021
2007	Noora Hautakangas	Jenni Laaksola; Did not compete	Joanna Väre	Debuted 2020	Debuted 2021
2006	Ninni Laaksonen	Sini Vahela	Karoliina Yläjoki	Debuted 2020	Debuted 2021
2005	Hanna Ek	Elina Nurmi; Did not compete	Susanna Laine	Debuted 2020	Debuted 2021
2004	Mira Salo	Krista Järvinen; Did not compete	Henna Ylilauri	Debuted 2020	Debuted 2021
2003	Anna Strömberg	Piritta Hannula	Suvi Hartlin	Debuted 2020	Debuted 2021
2002	Janette Broman	Kaisa Jaako; Did not compete	Katariina Kulve	Debuted 2020	Debuted 2021
2001	Heidi Willman	Susanna Tervaniemi	Hanna Pajulammi	Debuted 2020	Debuted 2021
2000	Suvi Miinala	Jenni Dahlman	Kati Nirkko	Debuted 2020	Debuted 2021
1999	Vanessa Forsman	Minna Lehtine	Saija Palin	Debuted 2020	Debuted 2021
1998	Jonna Kauppila	Mandi Malek; Did not compete	Piia Hartikainen	Debuted 2020	Debuted 2021
1997	Karita Tuomola	Taija Jurmu; Did not compete	Maria Hietanen	Debuted 2020	Debuted 2021
1996	Lola Odusoga	Anitra Ahtola	Ulrika Wester	Debuted 2020	Debuted 2021
1995	Heli Pirhonen	Miia Puoskari	Susanne Tasa	Debuted 2020	Debuted 2021
1994	Henna Meriläinen	Petra von Hellens	Marja Vuoristo	Debuted 2020	Debuted 2021
1993	Tarja Smura	Emilia Söderman	Arlene Kotala	Debuted 2020	Debuted 2021
1992	Kirsi Syrjänen	Kirsi-Maria Ketola	Tiina Salmesvirta	Debuted 2020	Debuted 2021
1991	Tanja Vienonen	Nina Autio	Päivi Hytinkoski	Debuted 2020	Debuted 2021
1990	Tiina Vierto	Nina Björkfelt	Anu Yli-Mäenpää	Debuted 2020	Debuted 2021
1989	Åsa Lövdahl	Minna Kittilä	Tuija Junnila	Debuted 2020	Debuted 2021
1988	Nina Björnström	Minna Rinnetmäki	Sari Pääkkönen	Debuted 2020	Debuted 2021
1987	Outi Tanhuanpää	Niina Kärkkäinen	Tarja Musikka	Debuted 2020	Debuted 2021
1986	Tuula Polvi	Maarit Salomäki	Saila Saarinen	Debuted 2020	Debuted 2021
1985	Marja Kinnunen	Elisa Yliniemi	Marjukka Tontti	Debuted 2020	Debuted 2021
1984	Anna-Liisa Tilus	Tiina Laine	Tiina Hyvärinen	Debuted 2020	Debuted 2021
1983	Nina Rekola	Marita Pekkala	Niina Kesäniemi	Debuted 2020	Debuted 2021
1982	Sari Aspholm	Tarja Hakakoski	Aino Summa	Debuted 2020	Debuted 2021
1981	Merja Varvikko	Eija Korolainen	Pia Nurminen	Debuted 2020	Debuted 2021
1980	Sirpa Viljamaa	Marja-Leena Palo	Anne-Marie Tarhia	Debuted 2020	Debuted 2021
1979	Päivi Uitto	Tuire Pentikäinen	Käte Nyberg	Debuted 2020	Debuted 2021
1978	Seija Paakkola	Tii Heilimo	Eija Laaksonen	Debuted 2020	Debuted 2021
1977	Armi Aavikko†	Maarit Ryhänen	Marianne Åström	Debuted 2020	Debuted 2021
1976	Suvi Lukkarinen	Riitta Väisänen; Miss Europe 1976	Maarit Leso	Debuted 2020	Debuted 2021
1975	Anne Pohtamo; Miss Universe 1975	Merja Tammi	Eeva Mannerberg	Debuted 2020	Debuted 2021
1974	Johanna Raunio	Talvikki Ekman	Leena Vainio	Debuted 2020	Debuted 2021
1973	Raija Stark	Seija Mäkinen	Marita Smeds	Debuted 2020	Debuted 2021
1972	Maj-Len Eriksson†	Tarjs Leskinen	Anneli Björkling; Miss International 1973	Debuted 2020	Debuted 2021
1971	Pirjo Laitila	Eila Kivistö	Mirja Halme	Debuted 2020	Debuted 2021
1970	Ursula Rainio	Hannele Hamara	Margarita Marta Briese	Debuted 2020	Debuted 2021
1969	Harriet Eriksson	Päivi Raita	Crista Oinonen	Debuted 2020	Debuted 2021
1968	Leena Brusiin; Miss Europe 1968	Sirpa Wilkman	Leena Sipilä	Debuted 2020	Debuted 2021
1967	Ritva Lehto †	Satu Kostiainen	Hedy Rännäri	Debuted 2020	Debuted 2021
1966	Satu Östring	Marita Gellman	Terttu Ronkainen	Debuted 2020	Debuted 2021
1965	Virpi Miettinen	Raija Salminen	Esti Östring	Debuted 2020	Debuted 2021
1964	Sirpa Suosmaa	Sirpa Wallenius	Maila Östring	Debuted 2020	Debuted 2021
1963	Marja-Liisa Ståhlberg	Riitta Kautiainen	Anneli Rantala	Debuted 2020	Debuted 2021
1962	Kaarina Leskinen	Aulikki Järvinen	Eeva Malinen	Debuted 2020	Debuted 2021
1961	Ritva Wächter	Ann-Mari Nygård	Marja Ryönä	Debuted 2020	Debuted 2021
1960	Margareta Schauman	Heli Heiskala	Maija-Leena Manninen	Debuted 2020	Debuted 2021
1959	Tarja Nurmi	Margit Jaatinen	Else-Maj Petham	Debuted 2020	Debuted 2021
1958	Pirkko Mannola	Eva-Maija Sariola	Anja Hatakka	Debuted 2020	Debuted 2021
1957	Marita Lindahl†; Miss World 1957	Airi Ikävalko	Saara Turunen	Debuted 2020	Debuted 2021
1956	Sirpa Koivu	Raija Kunnasmaa	Irmeli Sipilä	Debuted 2020	Debuted 2021
1955	Inga-Britt Söderberg†; Miss Europe 1955	Mirva Arvinen	Anni Helenius	Debuted 2020	Debuted 2021
1954	Yvonne de Bruyn	Liisa Hokkanen	Leni Katajakoski	Debuted 2020	Debuted 2021
1953	Maija-Riitta Tuomaala	Airi Uitto	Inger Sandvik	Debuted 2020	Debuted 2021
1952	Eva Hellas	Kyllikki Koskihalme	x	Debuted 2020	Debuted 2021
1951	Hilkka Ruuska	x	x	Debuted 2020	Debuted 2021
1950	Hilkka Ruuska	Heidi Lybeck	x	Debuted 2020	Debuted 2021
1948	Terttu Nyman	Maija-Liisa Kuukasjärvi	Orvokki Tukiainen	Debuted 2020	Debuted 2021
1947	Anna-Liisa Leppänen	Margit Mattsson	Maire Kinnunen	Debuted 2020	Debuted 2021
1946	Anja Kola	Kirsti Sammalisto	Debuted 1947	Debuted 2020	Debuted 2021
1945	Irja Alho	Ulla Pihl	Debuted 1947	Debuted 2020	Debuted 2021
1941	("Miss Messuhalli")*	x	Debuted 1947	Debuted 2020	Debuted 2021
1938	Sirkka Salonen; Miss Europe 1938	Bertta Bask	Debuted 1947	Debuted 2020	Debuted 2021
1937	Margareta Huldin	Britta Wikström; Miss Europe 1937	Debuted 1947	Debuted 2020	Debuted 2021
1936	Irma Streng	Rita Molander	Debuted 1947	Debuted 2020	Debuted 2021
1935	Terttu Lyytikäinen	Eeva Sihvonen	Debuted 1947	Debuted 2020	Debuted 2021
1934	Anna-Lisa Fahler	Karin Romantschuk	Debuted 1947	Debuted 2020	Debuted 2021
1933	Ester Toivonen†; Miss Europe 1934	Madeleine Lindebäck	Debuted 1947	Debuted 2020	Debuted 2021
1932	Maija Nissinen	Debuted 1933	Debuted 1947	Debuted 2020	Debuted 2021
1931	Ranghild Nyholm	Debuted 1933	Debuted 1947	Debuted 2020	Debuted 2021

== Titleholders under Miss Suomi org. ==
=== Miss Universe Finland ===
- : Declared as Winner
- : Ended as runner-up or top 5/6 qualification
- : Ended as one of the finalists or semifinalists
- : Ended as special awards winner

Miss Suomi started sending the winner of Miss Finland to Miss Universe in 1964. In the past, if the winner did not qualify (due to her age) for the contest, a runner-up was sent.

Year	Region	Hometown	Miss Finland	Placement at Miss Universe	Special awards
2026	Satakunta	Pori	Veera Gronlund	TBA	
2025	Uusimaa	Helsinki	Sarah Dzafce	Unplaced	
2024	Pirkanmaa	Tampere	Matilda Wirtavuori	Top 30	Miss Universe Europe & Middle East; Voice For Change (Silver Winner)
2023	Uusimaa	Helsinki	Paula Joukanen	Unplaced	
2022	South Savo	Savonlinna	Petra Hämäläinen	Unplaced	
2021	Ostrobothnia	Vaasa	Essi Unkuri	Unplaced	
2020	Pirkanmaa	Tampere	Viivi Altonen	Unplaced	
2019	Pirkanmaa	Sastamala	Anni Harjunpää	Unplaced	
2018	Päijät-Häme	Lahti	Alina Voronkova	Unplaced	
2017	Uusimaa	Helsinki	Michaela Söderholm	Unplaced	
2016	Central Finland	Jyväskylä	Shirly Karvinen	Unplaced	
2015	North Ostrobothnia	Oulu	Rosa-Maria Ryyti	Unplaced	
2014	Central Finland	Jyväskylä	Bea Toivonen	Unplaced	
2013	Southern Ostrobothnia	Nurmo	Lotta Hintsa	Unplaced	
2012	Uusimaa	Helsinki	Sara Chafak	Unplaced	
2011	North Karelia	Joensuu	Pia Pakarinen	Unplaced	
2010	Uusimaa	Vantaa	Viivi Pumpanen	Unplaced	
2009	Satakunta	Säkylä	Essi Pöysti	Unplaced	
2008	Pirkanmaa	Tampere	Satu Tuomisto	Unplaced	
2007	Southern Ostrobothnia	Soini	Noora Hautakangas	Unplaced	
2006	Uusimaa	Helsinki	Ninni Laaksonen	Unplaced	
2005	Uusimaa	Porvoo	Hanna Ek	Unplaced	
2004	Uusimaa	Helsinki	Mira Salo	Unplaced	
2003	Ostrobothnia	Kristinestad	Anna Strömberg	Unplaced	
2002	Southwest Finland	Lieto	Janette Broman	Unplaced	
2001	Central Finland	Jyväskylä	Heidi Willman	Unplaced	
2000	Lapland	Kemi	Suvi Miinala	Unplaced	
1999	Uusimaa	Porvoo	Vanessa Forsman	Unplaced	
1998	Central Ostrobothnia	Kokkola	Jonna Kauppila	Unplaced	
1997	North Savo	Kuopio	Karita Tuomola	Unplaced	
1996	Southwest Finland	Turku	Lola Odusoga	2nd Runner-up	
1995	North Karelia	Kitee	Heli Pirhonen	Unplaced	
1994	North Karelia	Tohmajärvi	Henna Meriläinen	Unplaced	
1993	North Karelia	Nurmes	Tarja Smura	Top 10	
1992	Uusimaa	Helsinki	Kirsi Syrjänen	Unplaced	
1991	Southwest Finland	Salo	Tanja Vienonen	Unplaced	
1990	Uusimaa	Helsinki	Tiina Vierto	Unplaced	
1989	Uusimaa	Helsinki	Åsa Lövdahl	Top 10	
1988	Uusimaa	Porvoo	Nina Björnström	Unplaced	
1987	Pirkanmaa	Tampere	Outi Tanhuanpää	Unplaced	
1986	South Ostrobothnia	Laupa	Tuula Polvi	4th Runner-up	
1985	Central Finland	Jämsä	Marja Kinnunen	Unplaced	
1984	Central Ostrobothnia	Himanka	Anna-Liisa Tilus	Unplaced	
1983	Satakunta	Nakkila	Nina Rekola	Top 12	
1982	Uusimaa	Vantaa	Sari Aspholm	Top 12	
1981	Kanta-Häme	Forssa	Merja Varvikko	Unplaced	
1980	—	—	Sirpa Viljamaa	Unplaced	
1979	Uusimaa	Helsinki	Päivi Uitto	Unplaced	
1978	—	—	Seija Paakkola	Unplaced	
1977	Uusimaa	Helsinki	Armi Aavikko †	Unplaced	
1976	—	—	Suvi Lukkarinen	Unplaced	
1975	Uusimaa	Helsinki	Anne Pohtamo	Miss Universe 1975	
1974	Uusimaa	Helsinki	Johanna Raunio	2nd Runner-up	Miss Photogenic
1973	Uusimaa	Helsinki	Raija Stark	Unplaced	
1972	Uusimaa	Helsinki	Maj-Len Eriksson †	Unplaced	
1971	Uusimaa	Helsinki	Pirjo Laitila	2nd Runner-up	Best Swimsuit
1970	Lapland	Rovaniemi	Ursula Rainio	Unplaced	
1969	Southwest Finland	Turku	Harriet Eriksson	1st Runner-up	Best Swimsuit
1968	Uusimaa	Helsinki	Leena Brusiin	2nd Runner-up	
1967	—	—	Ritva Lehto †	3rd Runner-up	
1966	—	—	Satu Östring	1st Runner-up	
1965	—	—	Virpi Miettinen	1st Runner-up	
1964	—	—	Sirpa Suosmaa	Top 10	
1963	—	—	Riitta Kautiainen	Top 15	
1962	—	—	Aulikki Järvinen	2nd Runner-up	
1961	—	—	Ritva Wächter	Unplaced	
1960	—	—	Maija-Leena Manninen	Unplaced	
1959	—	—	Tarja Nurmi	Did not compete	
1958	—	—	Pirkko Mannola	Did not compete	
1957	—	—	Marita Lindahl †	Did not compete	
1956	—	—	Mirva Arvinen	Did not compete	
Suomen Neito directorship – a franchise holder to Miss Universe between 1952―1955
1955	—	—	Sirkku Talja	Unplaced	
1954	—	—	Lenita Airisto	Unplaced	
1953	—	—	Teija Anneli Sopanen	Unplaced	
1952	Northern Ostrobothnia	Muhos	Armi Helena Kuusela	Miss Universe 1952	

=== Miss International Finland ===
- : Declared as Winner
- : Ended as runner-up or top 5/6 qualification
- : Ended as one of the finalists or semifinalists
- : Ended as special awards winner

The 2nd Runner-up of Miss Suomi went to Miss International until 2017. In 2018 and 2019 the 1st Runner-up went to Miss International competition.

Year	Region	Hometown	Miss Int'l Finland	Placement at Miss International	Special awards
2026	Lapland	Posio	Jenni Karjalainen	TBA	
2025	Pirkanmaa	Tampere	Vera Eloranta	Unplaced	
2024	Uusimaa	Helsinki	Tiia Aalto	Unplaced	
2023	South Savo	Savonlinna	Petra Hämäläinen	Unplaced	
2022	Southwest Finland	Turku	Anna Merimaa	Top 15	Miss International Europe
Due to the impact of COVID-19 pandemic, no competition held between 2020―2021
2019	North Ostrobothnia	Oulu	Jutta Kyllönen	Top 15	
2018	South Karelia	Lappeenranta	Eevi Ihalainen	Unplaced	
2017	Pirkanmaa	Tampere	Pihla Koivuniemi	Top 15	
2016	Uusimaa	Helsinki	Emilia Seppänen	Top 15	
2015	Uusimaa	Helsinki	Saara Ahlberg	Unplaced	
2014	North Savo	Kuopio	Milla Romppanen	4th Runner-up	
2013	Uusimaa	Siuntio	Helianna Ylimaula	Unplaced	
2012	Southwest Finland	Turku	Viivi Suominen	1st Runner-up	
2011	Satakunta	Pori	Niina Lavonen	Unplaced	
2010	Uusimaa	Helsinki	Susanna Turja	Unplaced	
2009	Uusimaa	Helsinki	Linda Wikstedt	Top 15	
2008	North Ostrobothnia	Haukipudas	Janna Tannilla	Unplaced	
2007	—	—	Joanna Väre	Unplaced	
2006	—	—	Karoliina Yläjoki	Unplaced	
2005	—	—	Susanna Laine	2nd Runner-up	
2004	—	—	Henna Ylilauri	Unplaced	
2003	—	—	Suvi Hartlin	2nd Runner-up	
2002	—	—	Katariina Kulve	Unplaced	
2001	—	—	Hanna Pajulammi	Unplaced	
2000	—	—	Kati Nirkko	Top 15	
1999	—	—	Saija Palin	2nd Runner-up	
1998	—	—	Piia Hartikainen	Top 15	Miss Friendship
1997	—	—	Maria Hietanen	Unplaced	
1996	—	—	Ulrika Wester	Unplaced	
1995	—	—	Susanne Tasa	Did not compete	
1994	—	—	Marja Vuoristo	Unplaced	
1993	—	—	Arlene Kotala	Unplaced	
1992	—	—	Tiina Salmesvirta	Top 15	
1991	—	—	Päivi Hytinkoski	Unplaced	
1990	—	—	Anu Yli-Mäenpää	Top 15	
1989	—	—	Minna Kittilä	Unplaced	
1988	—	—	Sari Pääkkönen	Top 15	
1987	—	—	Niina Kärkkäinen	Unplaced	
1986	—	—	Maarit Salomäki	Unplaced	
1985	—	—	Marjukka Tontti	Top 15	
1984	—	—	Tiina Hyvärinen	Top 15	
1983	—	—	Niina Kesäniemi	Unplaced	
1982	—	—	Aino Summa	Top 15	
1981	—	—	Merja Varvikko	Unplaced	
1980	—	—	Paula Nieminen	Unplaced	
1979	—	—	Käte Nyberg	3rd Runner-up	
1978	—	—	Hymy Marja Suuronen	Unplaced	
1977	—	—	Arja-Liisa Lehtinen	Unplaced	
1976	—	—	Maarit Leso	Unplaced	
1975	—	—	Eeva Mannerberg	1st Runner-up	
1974	Southwest Finland	Turku	Johanna Raunio	2nd Runner-up	
1973	—	—	Anneli Björkling	Miss International 1973	
1972	—	—	Tarja Annikki Leskinen	Top 15	
1971	—	—	Hannele Halme	4th Runner-up	
1970	—	—	Irene Karvola	Unplaced	
1969	—	—	Satu Charlotta Östring	1st Runner-up	Miss Photogenic
1968	—	—	Satu Kostiainen	Unplaced	
1967	—	—	Terttu Ronkainen	Top 15	
No contest
1965	—	—	Esti Östring	Top 15	
1964	—	—	Maila Maria Östring	4th Runner-up	
1963	—	—	Anneli Rantala	Unplaced	
1962	—	—	Eeva Malinen	Top 15	
1961	—	—	Marja Ryönä	Top 15	
1960	—	—	Marketta Nieminen	Unplaced	

=== Miss World Finland ===
- : Declared as Winner
- : Ended as runner-up or top 5/6 qualification
- : Ended as one of the finalists or semifinalists
- : Ended as special awards winner

The 1st Runner-up of Miss Suomi went to Miss World until 2017. In 2018 the 2nd Runner-up went to Miss World, and in 2019 Dana Mononen was appointed as Miss World Finland 2019 by Miss Suomi Organization.

Year	Region	Hometown	Miss World Finland	Placement at Miss World	Special awards
2027	Pirkanmaa	Kangasala	Jenna Rintamäki	TBA	
2026	Central Finland	Jyväskylä	Kiia Huutoniemi	Unplaced	
2025	Uusimaa	Helsinki	Sofia Singh	Unplaced	
Miss World 2023 was rescheduled to 2024 due to the change of host and when entering India as the new host, there were several issues that caused the postponement until March 2024.
2023	North Savo	Sonkajärvi	Adelaide Botty van den Bruele	Unplaced	
Miss World 2021 was rescheduled to 16 March 2022 due to the COVID-19 pandemic outbreak in Puerto Rico, no edition started in 2022.
2021	Uusimaa	Vantaa	Lauta Hautaniemi	Unplaced	Miss World Sport (Top 32)
Due to the impact of COVID-19 pandemic, no competition held in 2020
2019	Uusimaa	Helsinki	Dana Mononen	Unplaced	Miss World Top Model (Top 40)
2018	Uusimaa	Helsinki	Jenny Lappalainen	Unplaced	Miss World Sport (Top 24)
2017	Southwest Finland	Turku	Adriana Gerxhalija	Unplaced	
2016	Southwest Finland	Turku	Heta Sallinen	Unplaced	
2015	Uusimaa	Helsinki	Carola Miller	Unplaced	Miss World Talent (Top 30)
2014	Uusimaa	Helsinki	Krista Haapalainen	Top 25	Miss World Sport; Miss World Talent (Top 30)
2013	Pirkanmaa	Nokia	Maija Kerisalmi	Unplaced	
2012	Uusimaa	Helsinki	Sabina Särkkä	Unplaced	Miss World Talent (Top 25)
2011	Lapland	Tornio	Sara Sieppi	Unplaced	
2010	Uusimaa	Helsinki	Anne Nurminen	Unplaced	Miss World Sport (Top 20); Miss World Talent (Top 21)
2009	Southwest Finland	Turku	Sanna Anniina Kankaanpää	Unplaced	
2008	Uusimaa	Helsinki	Linda Wikstedt	Unplaced	
2007	Uusimaa	Porvoo	Linnea Eerica Annikki Aaltonen	Unplaced	
2006	—	—	Jenniina Elva Kristina Tuokko	Unplaced	Miss World Sport (Top 27)
2005	—	—	Elina Nurmi	Did not compete	
2004	Southwest Finland	Naantali	Nina Johanna Tikanmäki	Unplaced	
2003	—	—	Katri Johanna Hynninen	Unplaced	
2002	—	—	Hannenn Hynynen	Unplaced	
2001	—	—	Jenni Dahlman	Unplaced	
2000	—	—	Salima Anita Peippo	Unplaced	
1999	—	—	Maria Laamanen	Unplaced	
1998	—	—	Maaret Saija Nousiainen	Unplaced	
1997	—	—	Minna Lehtinen	Unplaced	
1996	—	—	Hanna Hirvonen	Unplaced	
1995	—	—	Terhi Koivisto	Unplaced	
1994	—	—	Mia Marianne Forsell	Unplaced	
1993	—	—	Janina Frostell	Top 10	
1992	—	—	Petra Enrika Von Hellens	Top 10	
1991	—	—	Nina Autio	Unplaced	
1990	—	—	Nina Björkfelt	3rd Runner-up	
1989	—	—	Åsa Lövdahl	Unplaced	
1988	—	—	Nina Björnström	Unplaced	
1987	—	—	Minna Rinnetmäki	Unplaced	
1986	—	—	Satu-Riitta Alaharja	Unplaced	
1985	—	—	Marja Kinnunen	Unplaced	
1984	—	—	Anna-Liisa Tilus	Top 15	
1983	—	—	Marita Pekkala	Unplaced	
1982	—	—	Sari Aspholm	1st Runner-up	
1981	—	—	Pia Nurminen	Unplaced	
1980	—	—	Ritva Helena Tamio	Unplaced	
1979	—	—	Tuire Pentikäinen	Unplaced	
1978	—	—	Eija Laaksonen	Top 15	
1977	—	—	Asta Seppälä	Top 15	
1976	—	—	Merja Tammi	4th Runner-up	
1975	—	—	Leena Kaarina Vainio	Top 15	
1974	—	—	Talvikki Ekman	Unplaced	
1973	—	—	Seija Mäkinen	Unplaced	
1972	—	—	Anneli Björkling	5th Runner-up	
1971	—	—	Mirja Halme	Unplaced	
1970	—	—	Hannele Hamara	Unplaced	
1969	—	—	Päivi Raita	Top 15	
1968	—	—	Leena Sipilä	Unplaced	
1967	—	—	Hedy Rännäri	Unplaced	
1966	—	—	Marita Gellman	Unplaced	
1965	—	—	Raija Salminen	Top 16	
1964	—	—	Maila Maria Östring	Unplaced	
1963	—	—	Marja-Liisa Ståhlberg	2nd Runner-up	
1962	—	—	Kaarina Leskinen	1st Runner-up	
1961	—	—	Ritva Wächter	Top 15	
1960	—	—	Margareta Schaouman	Unplaced	
1959	—	—	Margit Jaatinen	Unplaced	
1958	—	—	Eva-Maija Sariola	Did not compete	
1957	Uusimaa	Helsinki	Marita Lindahl†	Miss World 1957	
1956	—	—	Sirpa Koivu	Unplaced	
1955	—	—	Mirva Arvinen	Unplaced	
1954	—	—	Yvonne de Bruyn	Unplaced	
1953	—	—	Maija-Riitta Tuomaala	Unplaced	
1952	—	—	Eva Hellas	3rd Runner-up	
