= Jenni Väänänen =

Finnish model

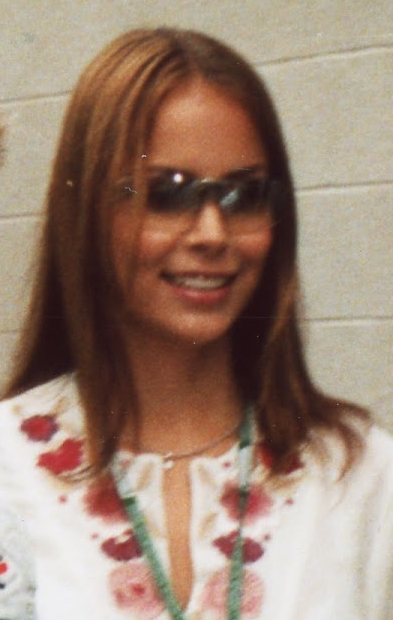
- Born: Jenni Dahlman; 27 October 1981 (age 44); Piikkiö, Finland
- Occupations: Model horseback rider
- Spouse(s): Kimi Räikkönen (m. 2004; div. 2014) Ossi Väänänen (m. 2021)
- Children: 2

Jenni Väänänen (née Dahlman, from 2004 to 2014 Dahlman-Räikkönen; born 27 October 1981) is a Finnish model and winner of the 2001 Miss Scandinavia contest.

== Career ==
Väänänen started modeling at the age of 14, and she was runner-up in Miss Finland 2000. One year later she became Miss Scandinavia. In the same year, she became Queen of the Year's second runner-up in Kuala Lumpur, Malaysia. In 1999, she competed in Miss Model of the Year 1999 and was one of the final ten contestants.

In 2005 she became a show jumping rider.

== Personal life ==
Väänänen met Formula One racing driver Kimi Räikkönen in late 2000 during the Miss Scandinavia contest that she won. They married on 31 July 2004. The couple lived between Finland and Switzerland. They separated in February 2013 and divorced in 2014.

In 2021, Väänänen married former ice hockey player Ossi Väänänen. They have two sons (born in 2017 and 2018).
