= Carl-Erik Creutz =

Finnish radio announcer (1911–2000)

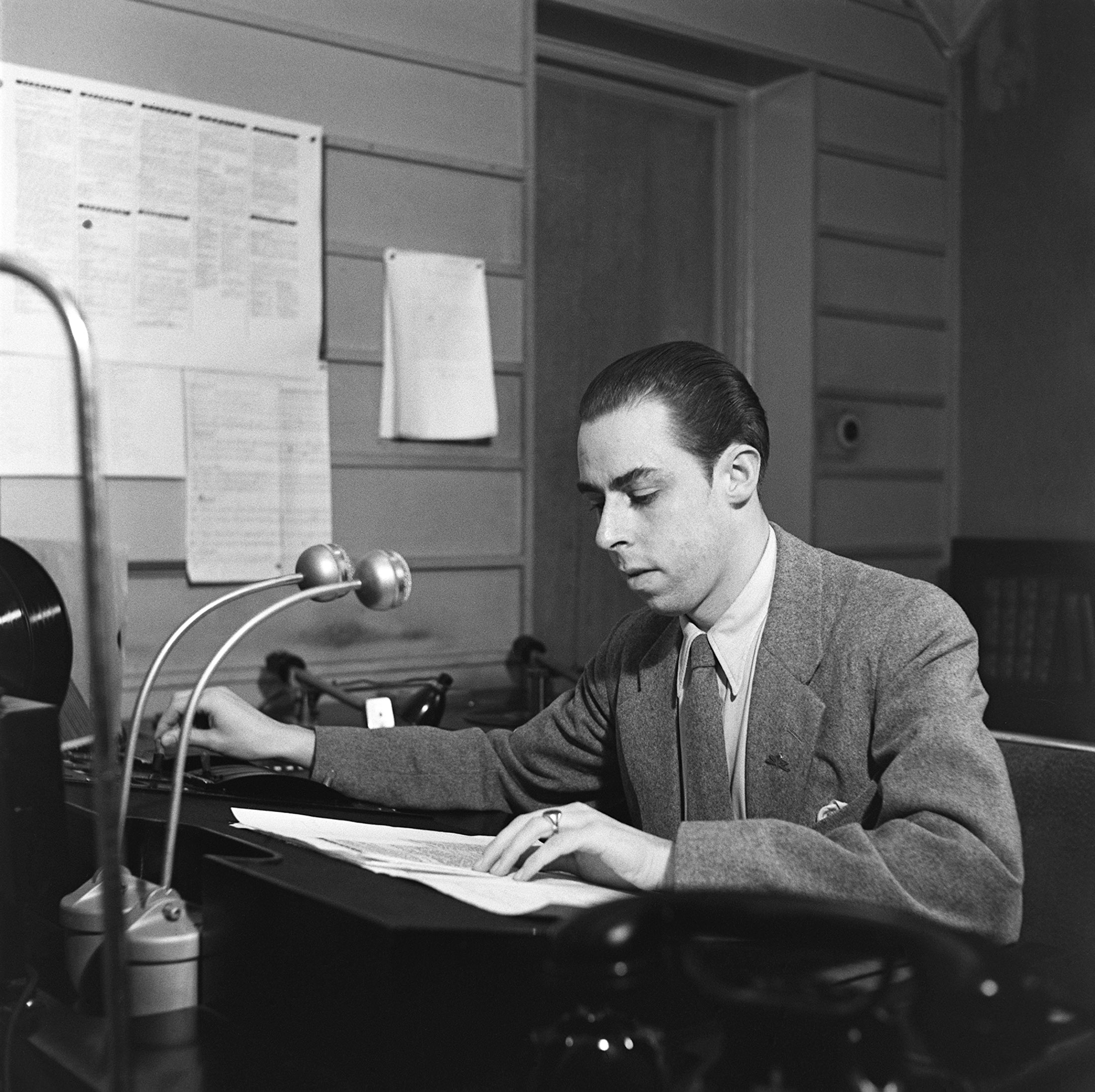
- Carl-Erik Creutz in the 1930s
- Born: 14 June 1911; Padasjoki, Finland
- Died: 5 June 2000 (aged 88); Helsinki, Finland
- Occupation: Radio announcer

Carl-Erik Creutz (1911–2000) was a Finnish radio announcer for the Finnish Broadcasting Company.

He started his career working for Yle in 1939. He also worked as a presenter, program editor, and a singer. He would greet listeners in the morning and bid them goodnight in the evening in a signature style. In 1956 he became the managing announcer. He trained new announcers, including Pentti Fagerholm. In 1976, Fagerholm took over position as manager from Creutz.

During World War II, Creutz provided all emergency announcements. He was bilingual, speaking Finnish and Swedish. He also facilitated public events and read audiobooks for the blind. He was the recipient of four Telvis awards.
