= Matilda Wirtavuori =

Finnish model and beauty queen

- Wirtavuori in 2026
- Born: 23 August 2000 (age 26); Tampere, Finland
- Height: 1.80 m (5 ft 11 in)
- Beauty pageant titleholder
- Title: Miss Finland 2024
- Major competitions: Miss Finland 2024 (Winner); Miss Eco International 2022 ( Top 21 ) Miss Universe 2024 (Top 30) (Miss Universe Europe and Middle East); MGI All Stars 2nd Edition (TBA)

Matilda Wirtavuori (born 23 August 2000) is a Finnish beauty pageant titleholder who was crowned Miss Finland 2024 and represented her country at Miss Universe 2024 in Mexico City, Mexico on 16 November 2024. She finished as a top 30 finalist, giving Finland their first placement at Miss Universe in 28 years.

She has a Master of Business Administration degree and is an entrepreneur.

Awards and achievements
Preceded by Inaugural	Miss Universe Europe & Middle East; 2024	Succeeded by (Malta) Julia Cluett
Preceded by Paula Joukanen	Miss Finland; 2024	Succeeded by Sarah Dzafce
