= Anneli Björkling =

Finnish beauty queen (born 1952)

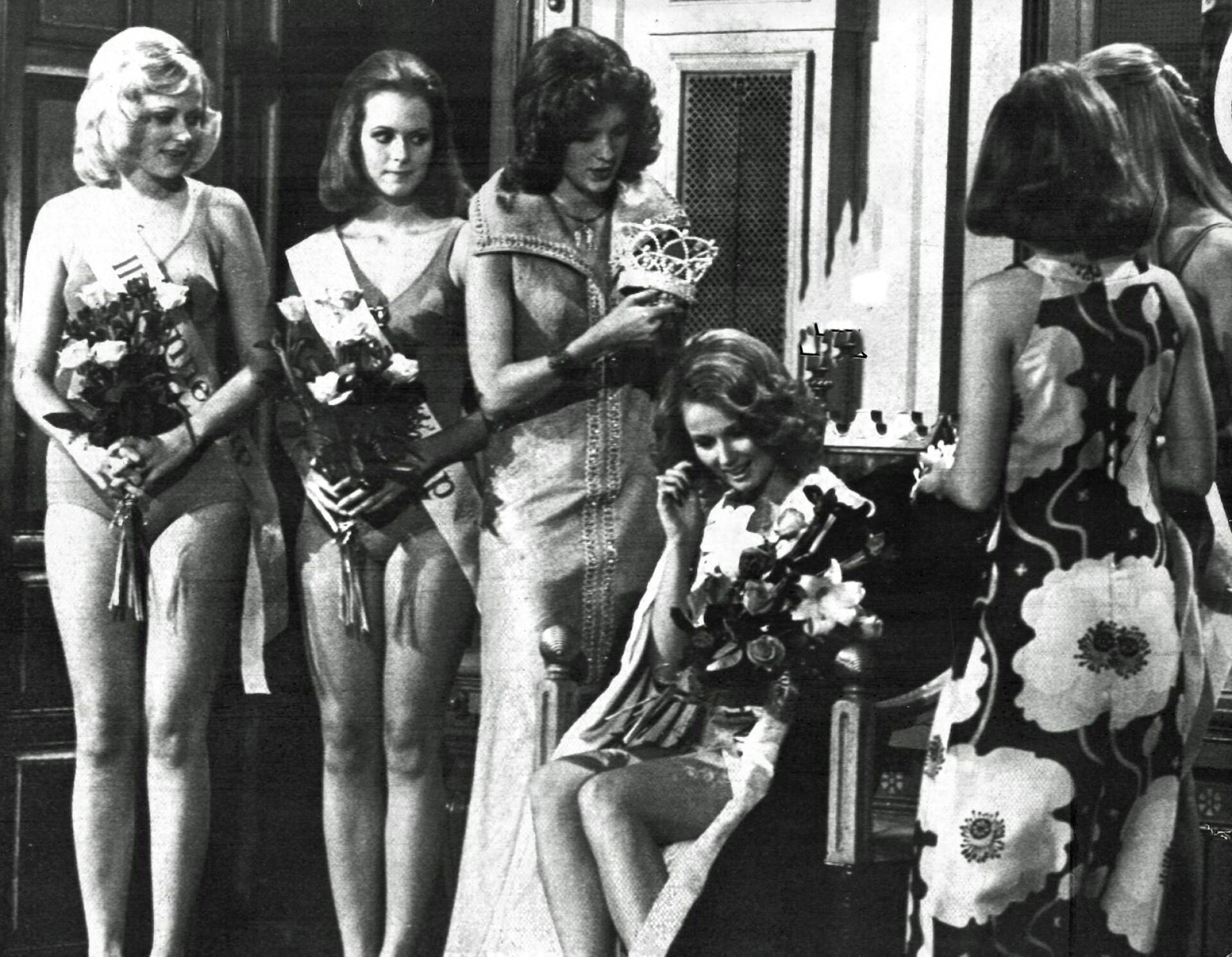
- Björkling (seated) receives the crown at the Miss Scandinavia pageant in October 1972 in Tampere, Finland.
- Born: 1952 (age 73–74)
- Occupation: Model
- Beauty pageant titleholder
- Title: Miss International 1973; Miss Scandinavia 1973
- Major competitions: Miss World 1972; (5th runner up); Miss International 1973; (Winner); Miss Scandinavia 1973; (Winner)

Tuula Anneli Björkling (born 1952) is a Finnish model and beauty queen who won the 1973 Miss International pageant held at the Exposition Hall Fairgrounds in Osaka, Japan. She is the first Finn to win the title.

Björkling previously competed in the Miss World 1972 pageant in London, United Kingdom, where she placed sixth. She is also the winner of the Miss Scandinavia 1973 contest, held in Tampere, Finland, in October 1972.

Awards and achievements
| Preceded by (United Kingdom) Linda Hooks | Miss International; 1973 | Succeeded by (United States) Brucene Smith |
