= Miss World 1957 =

7th Miss World pageant

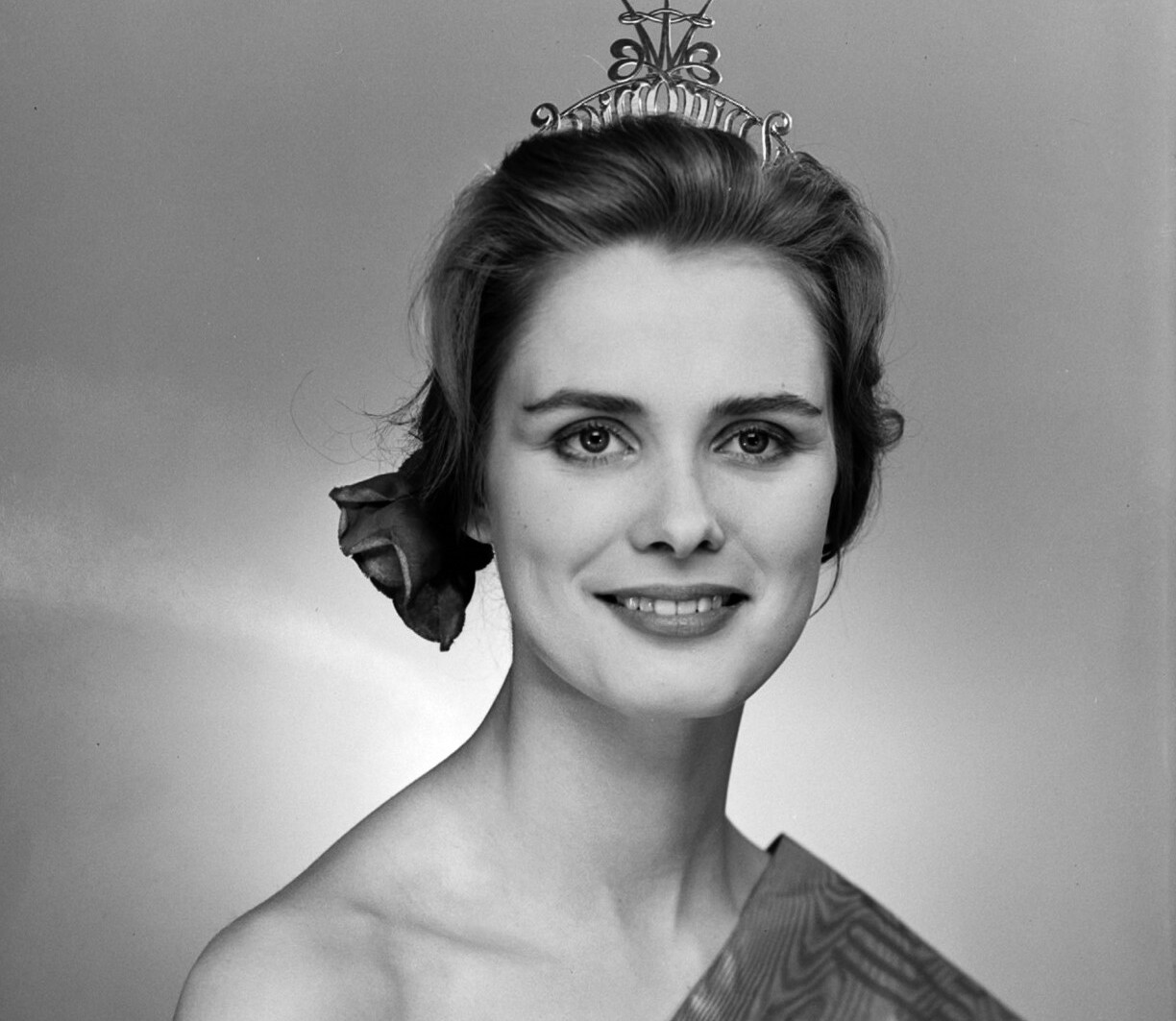
- Marita Lindahl
- Date: 14 October 1957
- Presenters: Eric Morley
- Venue: Lyceum Ballroom, London, United Kingdom
- Entrants: 23
- Placements: 7
- Debuts: Canada; Luxembourg
- Withdrawals: Egypt; New Zealand; Switzerland; Turkey
- Returns: Australia
- Winner: Marita Lindahl; Finland

Miss World 1957 was the seventh Miss World pageant, held at the Lyceum Ballroom in London, United Kingdom, on 14 October 1957.

At the conclusion of the event, June Hyde, Miss Welcome to London, crowned Marita Lindahl of Finland as Miss World 1957. This is the first victory of Finland in the history of the pageant.

Contestants from twenty-three countries participated in this year's pageant. The pageant was hosted by Eric Morley.

== Background ==
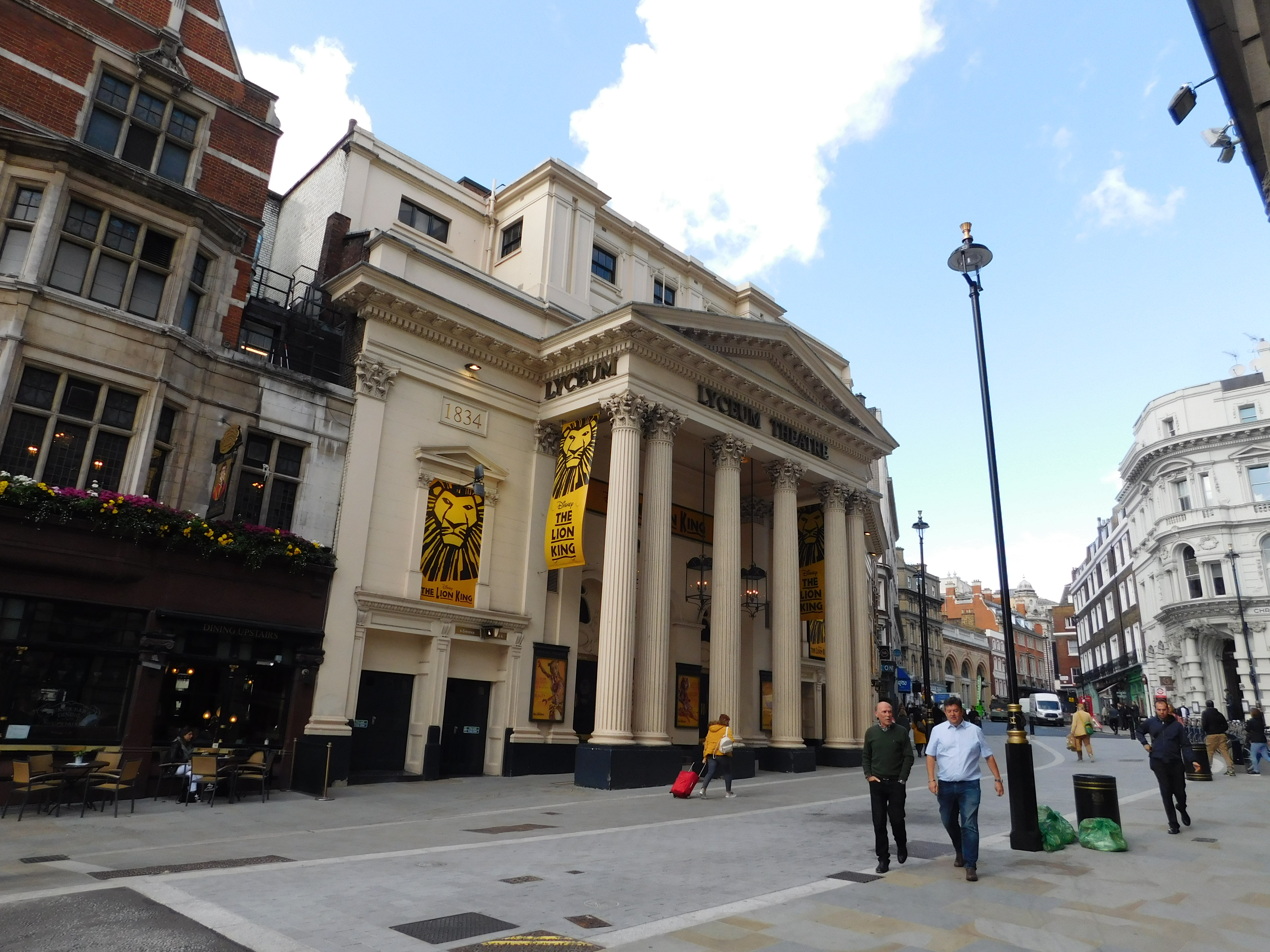
Lyceum Ballroom, venue of Miss World 1957

=== Selection of participants ===
Twenty-three contestants were selected to compete in the pageant. One contestant was appointed to represent her country after being a runner-up in her national pageant.

==== Replacements ====
Miss Holland 1957, Corine Rottschäfer was supposed to compete in this edition. However, since she had already won Miss Europe, she was replaced by her first runner-up, Christina van Zijp to compete in Miss World. Rottschäfer later competed at Miss World 1959 and won.

==== Debuts, returns and withdrawals ====
This edition marked the debut of Canada and Luxembourg, and the return of Australia, which last competed in 1955.

Zubaida Tharwat of Egypt and Yvonne Bridel of Switzerland did not participate due to budget constraints. Tharwat also withdrew from the competition due to the dispute between the United Kingdom and Egypt over the Suez Canal.

Leyla Sayar of Turkey did not participate for undisclosed reasons. New Zealand withdrew after its respective organization failed to hold a national competition or appoint a delegate.

Monica Amekoafia of Ghana was supposed to participate, but chose to get married. Alicja Bobrowska of Poland withdrew from the competition for undisclosed reasons.

== Results ==
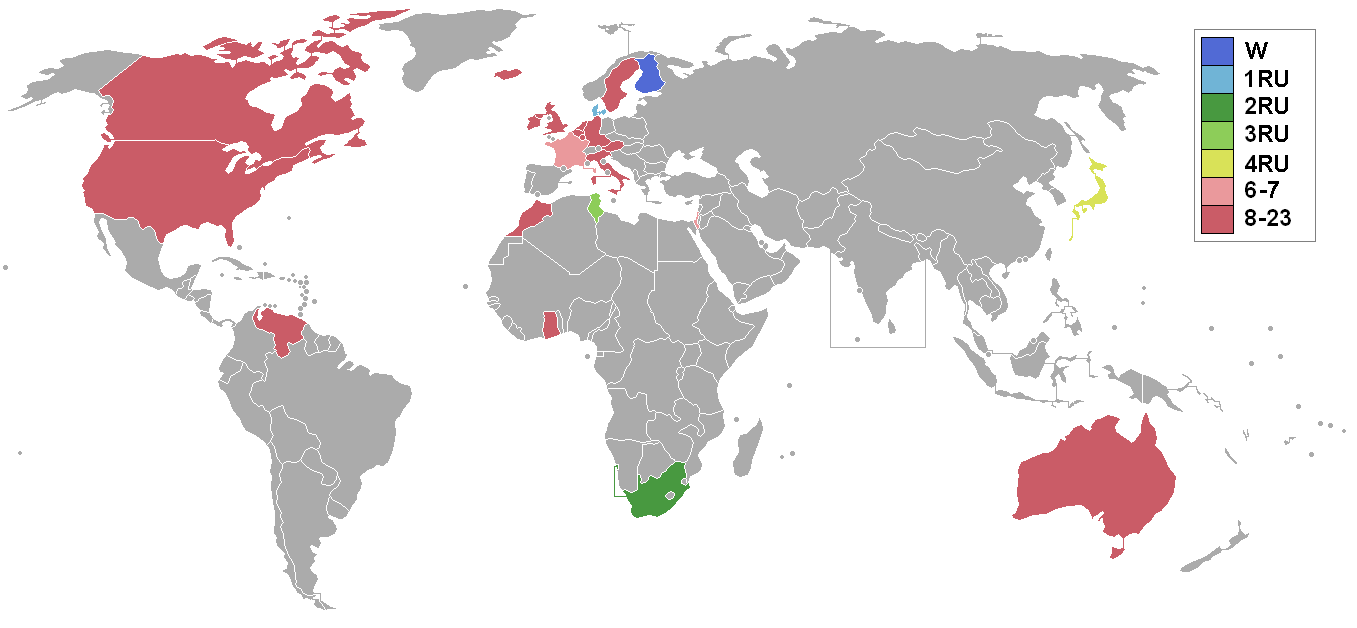
Miss World 1957 participating countries and territories

=== Placements ===
Placement	Contestant
Miss World 1957	Finland – Marita Lindahl
1st runner-up	Denmark – Lilian Juul Madsen
2nd runner-up	South Africa – Adele June Kruger
3rd runner-up	Tunisia – Jacqueline Tapia
4th runner-up	Japan – Muneko Yorifuji
5th runner-up	France – Claude Inès Navarro
6th runner-up	Israel - Sara Elimor

== Pageant ==
=== Format ===
The number of placements in this edition has been increased to seven from six in the previous edition. The seven finalists were selected through a preliminary competition held on the day of the final competition consisting of a swimsuit and an evening gown competition.

=== Selection committee ===
- Claude Berr – Co-head of the Miss Europe committee
- Charles Eade – British newspaper editor
- Norman Hartnell – British fashion designer
- Laurence Harvey – Lithuanian-born British actor
- Trevor Howard – British actor
- Charles Jacobs – American photographer
- Margaret Leighton – British actress
- Mrs. Raine McCorquodale – wife of the Earl of Dartmouth, Gerald Legge
- Lady Jane Vane-Tempest-Stewart – British socialite and philanthropist
- Stirling Moss – English Formula One racer

== Contestants ==
Twenty-three contestants competed for the title.

Country	Contestant	Age (Note: Age at the time of the pageant)	Hometown
Australia	Ronnie Goodlet	32	Victoria
Austria	Lilo Fischer	18	Graz
Belgium	Jeanne Chandelle	18	Brussels
Canada	Judith Welch	20	Toronto
Denmark	Lilian Juul Madsen	19	Copenhagen
Finland	Marita Lindahl	19	Helsinki
France	Claude Inès Navarro	19	Maoussa
Greece	Naná Gasparatou	–	Athens
Holland	Christina van Zijp	21	The Hague
Iceland	Rúna Brynjólfdóttir	–	Reykjavík
Ireland	Nessa Welsh	19	Dublin
Israel	Sara Elimor	17	Tel Aviv
Italy	Anna Gorassini	21	Milan
Japan	Muneko Yorifuji	21	Osaka
Luxembourg	Josee Jaminet	18	Luxembourg City
Morocco	Danielle Muller	19	Casablanca
South Africa	Adele June Kruger	21	Johannesburg
Sweden	Elenore Edin	22	Stockholm
Tunisia	Jacqueline Tapia	17	Tunis
Great Britain (Note: Competed as Great Britain in the pageant)	Leila Williams	20	Walsall
United States	Charlotte Sheffield	21	Salt Lake City
Venezuela	Consuelo Nouel	23	Caracas
West Germany	Annemarie Karsten	19	Lübeck
