= Karita Tykkä =

Finnish model (born 1976)

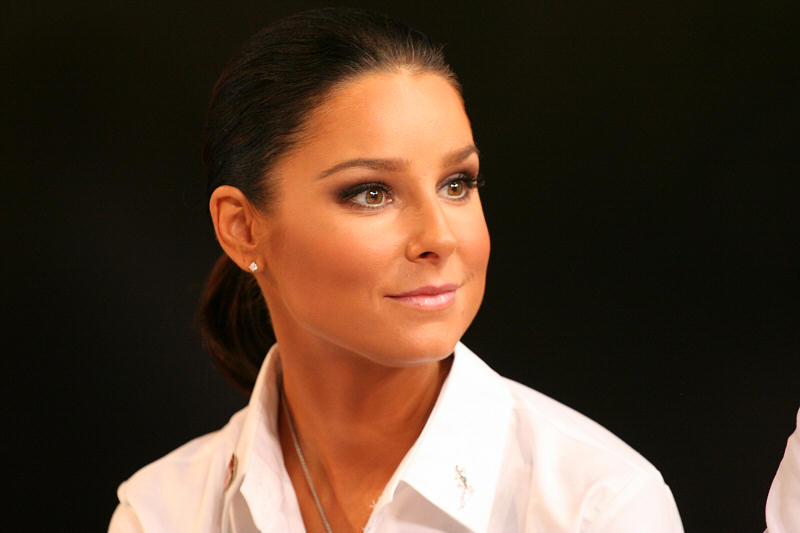
- Tykkä in 2006
- Born: Karita Tuomola; 22 September 1976 (age 50); Kuopio, Finland
- Spouse: Petri Tykkä
- Children: 1
- Beauty pageant titleholder
- Title: Miss Finland 1997; Miss Baltic Sea 1998
- Major competitions: Miss Finland 1997 (winner); Miss Universe 1997; Miss Baltic Sea 1998 (winner)

Karita Tykkä (born Karita Tuomola; 22 September 1976) is a Finnish actress, TV host and beauty pageant titleholder. She won the Miss Finland 1997 and represented her country at Miss Universe 1997. In 2001, she made her debut as an actress in the comedy film Ponterosa.

Tykkä married sports supplement entrepreneur Petri Tykkä on 9 August 2008 in Helsinki and they have one son (b. 2010). She was earlier engaged to television host Joonas Hytönen. In late September 2023, Petri Tykkä reported they had divorced.

Awards and achievements
Preceded by Lola Odusoga	Miss Finland; 1997	Succeeded by Jonna Kauppila
