= Satu Tuomisto (model) =

Finnish model (born 1986)

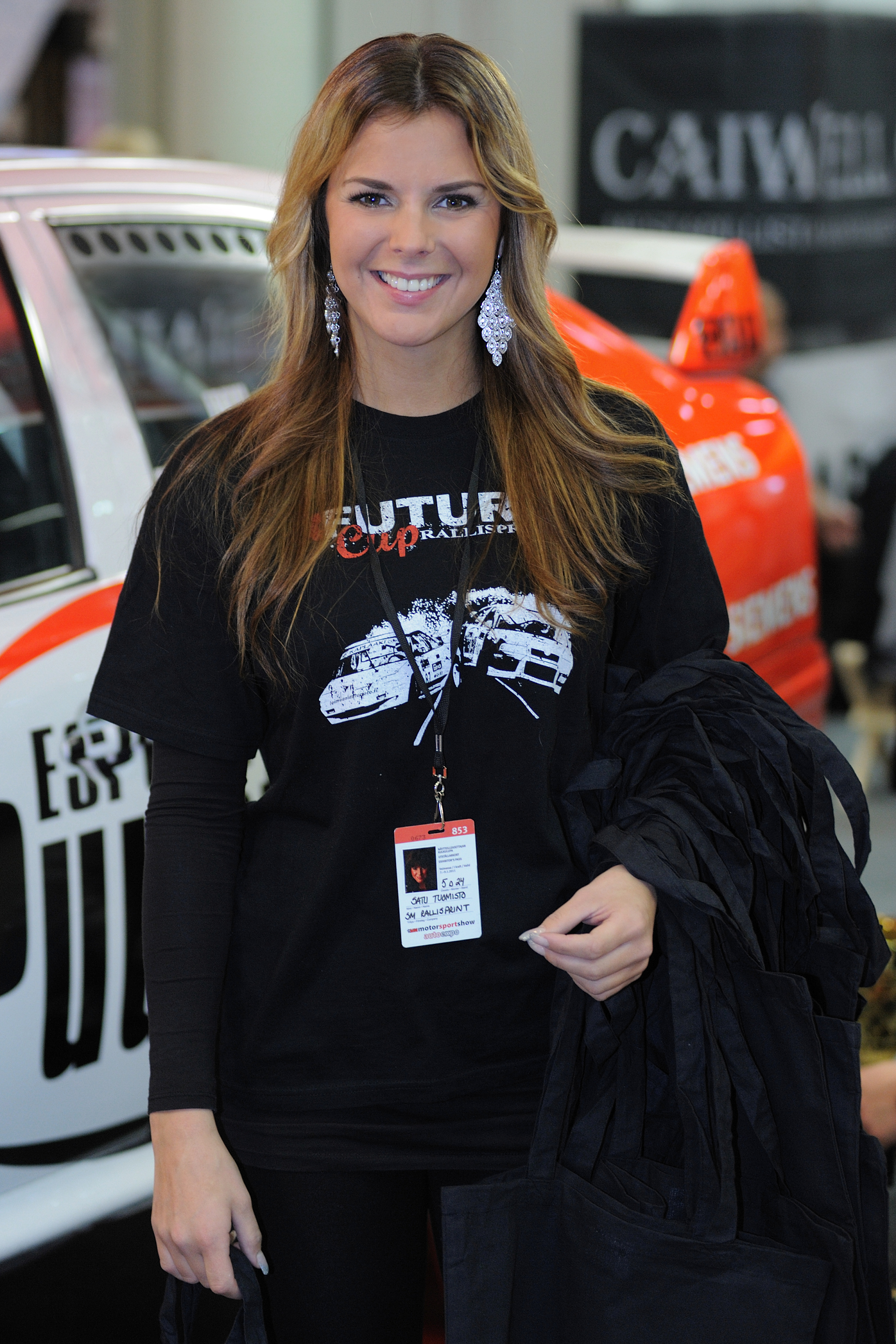
2011

Satu Sinikka Tuomisto (born 17 February 1986 in Tampere) is a Finnish model and beauty pageant titleholder who won Miss Finland 2008 competition. She also took part in the Miss Universe 2008 competition.

In February 2016 she got engaged to Petri Aarnio. They were married in August 2017 and divorced in summer 2019.

Tuomisto has later been engaged to former ice hockey player Toni Dahlman.

Awards and achievements
| Preceded by Noora Hautakangas | Miss Finland; 2008 | Succeeded by Essi Pöysti |
