= Satu Tuomisto (choreographer) =

Finnish contemporary dance choreographer

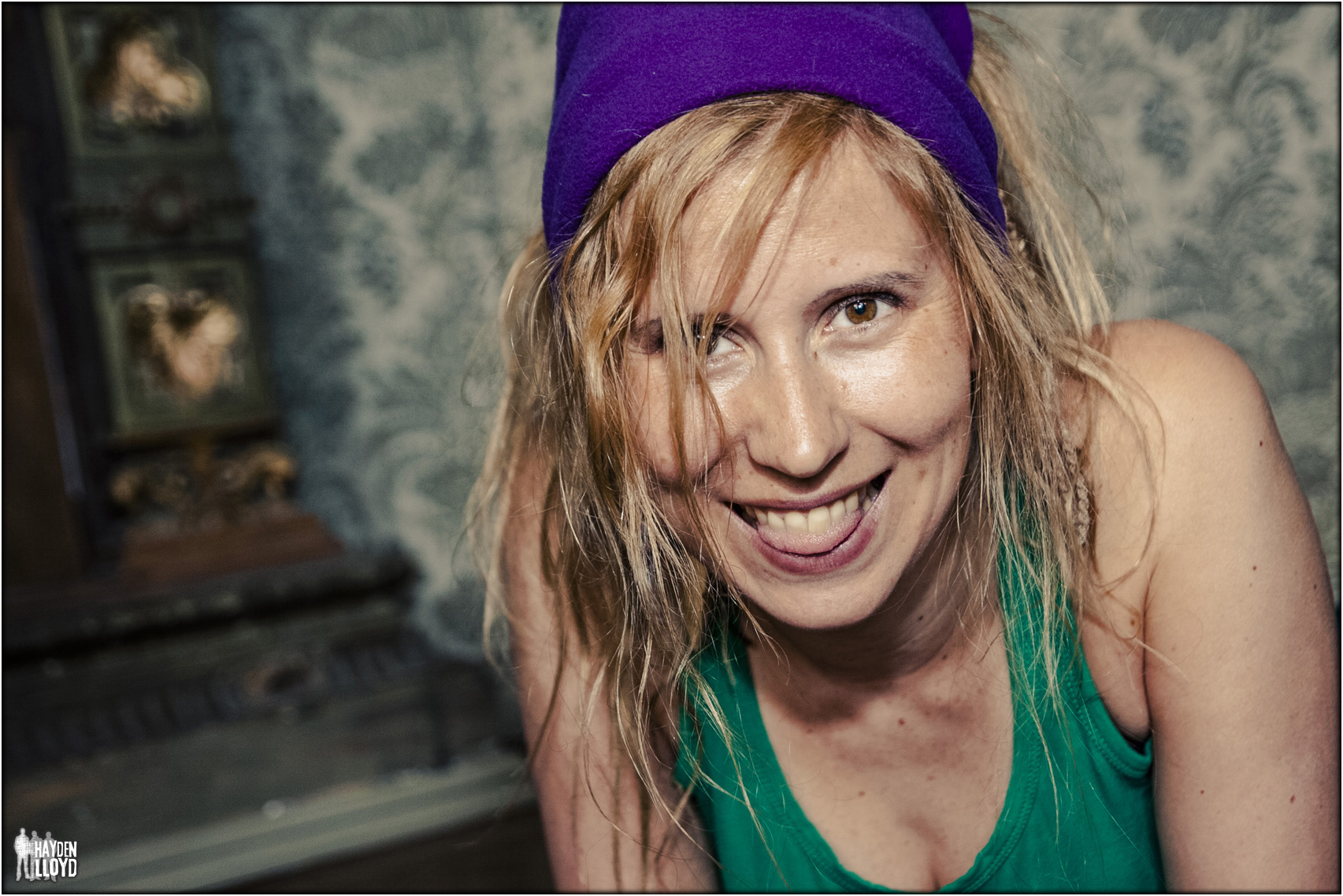
Satu Tuomisto (2011)

Satu Tuomisto is a Finnish contemporary dance choreographer whose pieces since the turn of the century have been performed in Britain, Finland and internationally.

== Biography ==
In 2000, Tuomisto graduated as a choreographer at Middlesex University in London. She worked in the UK for a decade, mainly at The Place, and returned to Finland in 2009. In January 2008, as part of the Europalia arts festival in Brussels, Tuomisto presented Mirjami & Mikael, a half-hour piece at the Théâtre 140 in which Satu Elovaara and Giorgio Convertito performed a presentation which included allusions to Finnish culture, the sauna and the country's black humour.

From 2011 to 2013 Tuomisto worked as the Artistic Director of JoJo Oulu Dance Centre. She takes up experimental challenges, collaborates with pop starts and brings together unusual partners to create emotional experiences for her audiences.

Her choreography of the Frennzy dance show at the Oulu City Theatre was particularly successful, running for ten nights. After presentations in the Netherlands, the dance sequence was performed in Germany, South Korea and Japan.

Her Riisuttuna (meaning Bare) show in March 2014 caused considerable discussion in the press as not only the actors were naked but people in the audience were encouraged to undress too. Tuomisto said she was surprised about all the reactions. "I am puzzled by the critics", she commented. "I had my own ideas putting on the show and clothes were just part of it."

In 2014 Tuomisto was awarded a five-year Artist Grant by the Arts Promotion Centre Finland.

With her contemporary dance choreographies Tuomisto aims to provide audiences with emotional and kinetic experiences.

== Recent choreographic presentations ==
- 2004: Toxic, The Place (London) 2004
- 2005: Something About US, 2005
- 2006: Viivana (Speedy), Zodiak – Uuden tanssin keskus 2006
- 2007: Mirjami and Mikael, The Place, London, 2007
- 2007: Heap, The Place (London) 2007
- 2008: Tell Me Something, Künstlerhaus Mousonturm (Brussels)
- 2008: Huu, haukka haukkaan, JoJo - Oulu Dance Centre 2008
- 2009: Olenko Olento, Dance Theatre Raatikko 2009
- 2010: Säätö, Kiasma Theatre 2010
- 2011: Lähellä (Close), Finnish National Ballet
- 2011: Kara and Oke, JoJo - Oulu Dance Centre and OAMK
- 2011: Keittiönpöydällä, Zodiak - Uuden tanssin keskus
- 2012: Vimmaa (Frenzy), JoJo - Oulu Dance Centre and Oulu City Theatre
- 2013: Sinua, part of Kinos-co-production, The Regional Dance Center in Northern Finland (JoJo, Rimpparemmi, Routa and Full Moon Dance)
- 2013: Halu (Urge), NOW Dance Company (South Korea), Matralab/Hexagram (Canada), JoJo – Oulu Dance Centre
- 2014: Riisuttuna (Bare), JoJo - Oulu Dance Centre, Oulu City Theatre and Oulu Music Festival
- 2015: Sieto - 3 du TROIS, Luxembourg
