= Italian Salvadorans =

Salvadoran citizens of Italian descent

Italo-salvadoregni (Italian) Ítalo-salvadoreños (Spanish)
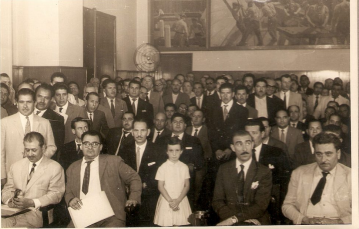
- Italian immigrants in San Salvador at the beginning of the 20th century

Total population
- c. 2,300 (by birth) c. 200,000 (by ancestry, corresponding to about 3% of the total population)

Regions with significant populations
- San Salvador, Santa Ana and Santa Tecla

Languages
- Salvadoran Spanish · Italian and Italian dialects

Religion
- Roman Catholic

Related ethnic groups
- Italians, Italian Americans, Italian Argentines, Italian Bolivians, Italian Brazilians, Italian Canadians, Italian Chileans, Italian Colombians, Italian Costa Ricans, Italian Cubans, Italian Dominicans, Italian Ecuadorians, Italian Guatemalans, Italian Haitians, Italian Hondurans, Italian Mexicans, Italian Panamanians, Italian Paraguayans, Italian Peruvians, Italian Puerto Ricans, Italian Uruguayans, Italian Venezuelans

Italian Salvadorans (Italian: italo-salvadoregni. Spanish: ítalo-salvadoreños) are Salvadoran-born citizens who are fully or partially of Italian descent, whose ancestors were Italians who emigrated to El Salvador during the Italian diaspora, or Italian-born people in El Salvador.

Italian Salvadorans are one of the largest European communities in El Salvador, and one of the largest in Central America and the Caribbean, as well as one of those with the greatest social and cultural weight in America.

Italians have strongly influenced Salvadoran society and participated in the construction of the country's identity. Italian culture is distinguished by infrastructure, gastronomy, education, dance, and other distinctions, there being several notable Salvadorans of Italian descent.

== History ==
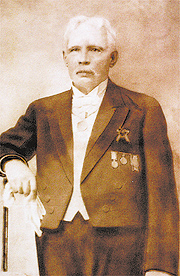
Juan Aberle, Italian Salvadoran who composed the National Anthem of El Salvador

There is evidence of Italians residing in El Salvador since 1850, therefore before the Italian unification, coming from the Kingdom of Sardinia-Piedmont and the Kingdom of the Two Sicilies, for which one distinguished intellectuals, merchants and other Italian lower-middle classes, with the ships that brought them to El Salvador departing from important port cities of Italy, especially Naples, Genoa and Palermo. Most of these Italians entered from the port of La Libertad and the east of the country, and in that period the Italians in the country did not exceed 2,000, however in the following years the number of arrivals would grow. In fact, most of the immigrants came from Italy between 1871 and World War II, after the Italian unification, with the peak occurring between 1880 and 1930.

In 1871, the Salvadoran government implemented reforms and took an interest in the agricultural colonies, and in 1890 the Italians arrived and in 1892 it was estimated that there were more than 600 Italians in the national territory. The Salesians also arrived and founded their first school in Central America, as well as many architects, to build theaters such as the Teatro de Santa Ana. In 1898, the Sociedad de Asistencia y Beneficencia entre Italianos en El Salvador ("Assistance and Charity Society among Italians in El Salvador"), was established with the aim of helping newly arrived Italians find work and help them financially until it was obtained.

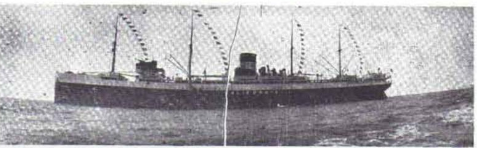
Ship of Italian immigrants in the port of La Libertad, El Salvador

The 20th century was characterized by the massive entry of Italians into the country. Between 1900 and 1909, more than 10,000 Italians from all Italian regions, mainly from Campania and Piedmont, arrived in the country. At that time, El Salvador was the second destination by number of choices by Italians expatriating to Central America, many looking for better opportunities for their businesses and improve their quality of life where different traders and Italians who enter the country stand out, many of whom stand out in sectors such as education, music, agriculture, the industry, commerce and infrastructure.

Between 1910 and 1919, thousands more Italians entered the country, registering more than 6,000 arrivals, with the Italian immigrants adapting to the new life, from southern and northern Italy for various reasons, mainly originating from Castelnuovo di Conza, Vercelli, Naples and Turin. During this decade, El Salvador was the main recipient of Italians in Central America, while between 1920 and 1929, several Italian traders and professionals arrived, but also lower-class Italians, many setting up their businesses.

Italian immigrants in El Salvador from 1850 to 1929
Period	Italian immigrants
1850–1869	1,000
1870–1879	2,500
1880–1889	2,000
1890–1899	6,500
1900–1909	10,000
1910–1919	6,000
1920–1929	4,000
Total	32,000

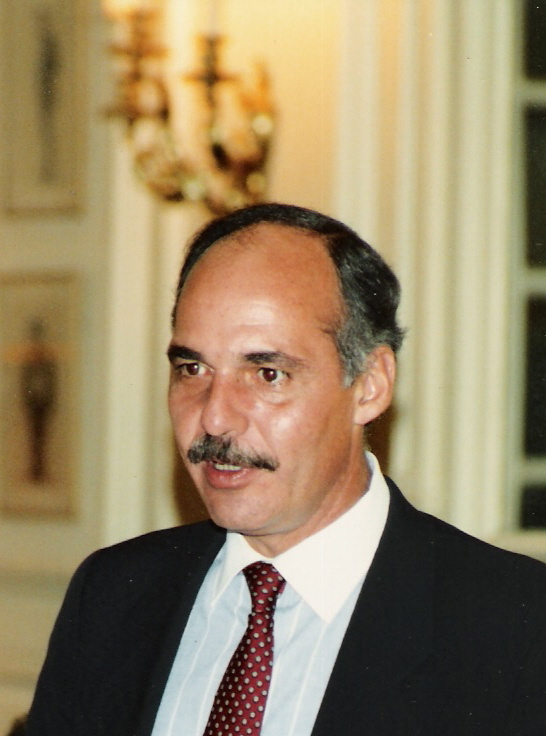
Alfredo Cristiani, former president of El Salvador, descendant of Italian immigrants

Starting in the 1930s, immigration from Italy began to decrease. In particular, it is estimated that between 1930 and 1939 more than 1,000 Italians arrived in the country and many started their own businesses.

Italian refugees arrived during World War II but to a lesser extent than in previous times. In particular, starting from 1940, due to World War II, a small migratory wave of thousands of Italians emigrated to El Salvador, where several traders and Italians stood out who wanted to improve their quality of life, with this period which was characterized by the entry of several Italian refugees, the majority of whom came from northern Italy. Several Italians from the Campanian town of Laviano also immigrated to El Salvador shortly after the war. Italians easily adapted and assimilated into the country and also began to distinguish themselves, mainly in commerce and industry.

Between 1960 and 1980, several Franciscans arrived in the country, many founded schools and organizations to help the Salvadoran people, but also to reactivate the Italian culture in the country. In the second half of the 20th century, Salvadoran music was enriched by the son of a Neapolitan emigrant, Francisco Palaviccini (1912–1996), who was a composer, director, saxophonist, trumpeter and singer of Salvadoran folklore and who was honored in 1992 by the government of El Salvador.

Between 1989 and 1994, the president of El Salvador was Alfredo Cristiani, of Italian origin. After five difficult years, he finished his mandate in 1994 and left his country stabilized by the Salvadoran Civil War that had plagued it for 20 years.

== Regions of origin ==
During the mid-19th century until the mid-20th century, waves of Italian immigrants were registered and arrived from all regions of Italy, mainly from Northern Italy and Southern Italy. The first Italians to arrive in the country were, before the unification of Italy, mainly the Italians from the Kingdom of Piedmont-Sardinia and from the Kingdom of the Two Sicilies, while from 1880, after the unification of Italy, there was a flow from all the Italian regions, mainly from the south of the peninsula, especially from regions such as Campania, Basilicata, Apulia and Sicily, but also from the north of the peninsula such as Piedmont, Liguria and Lombardy.

Italian emigrants arriving in El Salvador and their regional distribution
Period	Northern Italy	Central Italy	Southern and Insular Italy
1870–1879	34.6%	2.1%	63.3%
1880–1889	36.9%	2.7%	60.4%
1890–1899	38.5%	2.5%	59%
1900–1909	38.4%	2.2%	59.4%
1910–1928	37.7%	2.4%	59.9%

== Culture ==
=== Architecture ===
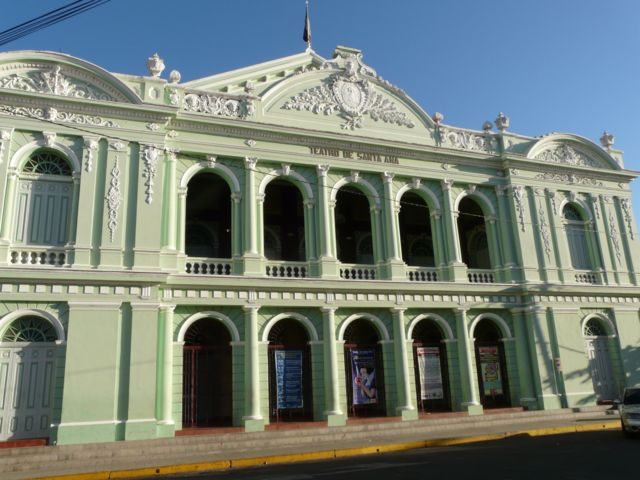
Teatro de Santa Ana

Between 1890 and 1899, more than 6,500 Italians arrived in the country, the vast majority arriving at the port of Libertad, and among them several architects and other Italian professionals arrived, such as those who built the Teatro de Santa Ana in Santa Ana. In 1890, in fact, the construction of the Theater was entrusted to the company Sociedad Constructora de Occidente, directed by the Italian architects Francesco Durini Vasalli and Cristóbal Molinari. In turn, the Italian artists Luis Arcangeli and Guglielmo Arone were hired. The theater's original curtain was in the Modernisme style, created by the Italian artist Antonio Rovescalli. Many other Italians have built various palaces and monuments in El Salvador. In fact, in the country there are many churches and houses of Italian style, an example is the Iglesia del Calvario in Santa Ana, which was built and designed with the support of the Italians.

=== Music and dance ===
National dance and music such as Adentro Cojutepeque and Carnaval En San Miguel, were made by Francisco Palaviccini, who was a composer of Italian origin, in 1819, while the national anthem of El Salvador was composed by General Salvadoran Juan José Cañas and the Italian musician Juan Aberle.

The ballet is a dance that is also considered national in El Salvador and which has been transformed into the national folk ballet with Italian and Salvadoran heritage.

=== Cuisine ===
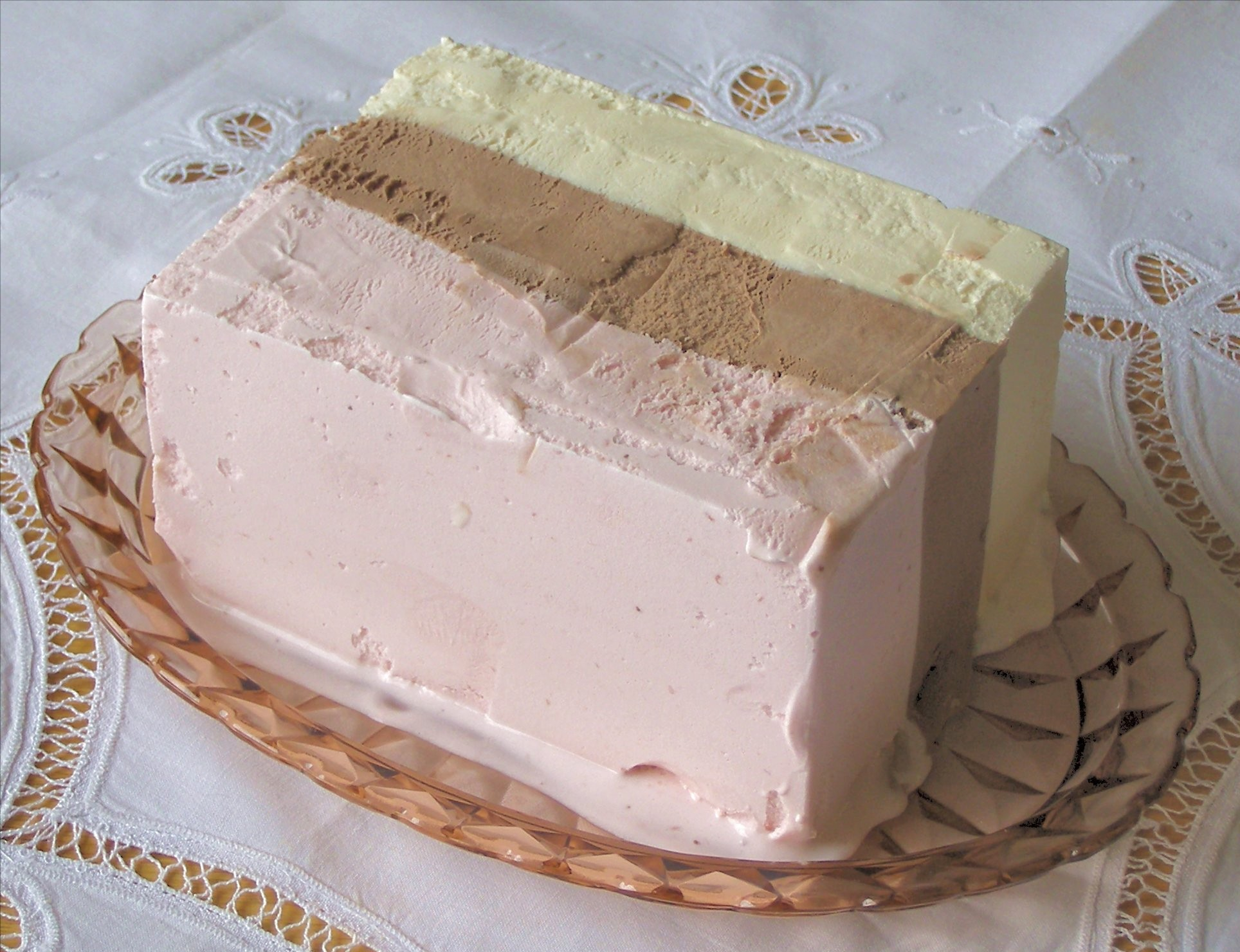
Neapolitan ice cream

In El Salvador there are many Italian restaurants, but the Italians have also spread Italian foods such as pasta, which is widely consumed with different recipes of Italian origin but also coming from globalization. Macaroni and spaghetti are the favorite and most consumed in El Salvador and are mainly prepared with tomato, chicken and sauce.

On the other hand, pizza, which is the best known Italian dish in the world, is also widespread in El Salvador. In El Salvador there are both traditional Italian, American and Salvadoran varieties of pizza. Pizza has also evolved with new ingredients such as Salvadoran-style pizza. Salvadoran pizzas are usually prepared with cheese, tomatoes, green pepper, onion and other ingredients added by Salvadoran gastronomy.

Italian cheeses are also widespread in El Salvador, the most popular of which is mozzarella, made from whole milk. As for desserts, the most popular are Neapolitan ice cream, tiramisu and ciambelle.

== Italian community ==
As of 2009, the Italian community in El Salvador is officially made up of 2,300 Italian citizens, while Salvadoran citizens with Italian descent exceed 200,000, corresponding to about 3% of the total population.

Most of the Italian community, including Italians and Italian-Salvadorans, live in the capital San Salvador or in its surroundings, such as Santa Tecla and Santa Ana. Several of its members have distinguished themselves in society, commerce, industry and the arts.

== Institutions ==
Since 1991, El Salvador has had a local office of the Italian Dante Alighieri Society, an institution responsible for the study and diffusion of the Italian language, as well as the diffusion of Italian culture in the world.

== Notable Italian Salvadorans ==
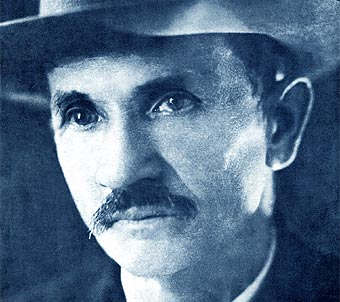
Arturo Ambrogi, writer and journalist, is considered one of the pioneers of Salvadoran literature.

- Humberto Aberle, aviator, son of Juan Aberle
- Juan Aberle, conductor and composer
- Rafael Alfaro Ferracuti, olympic swimmer
- Pablo Mauricio Alvergue, Vice President of El Salvador (1982-1984)
- Arturo Ambrogi, writer and journalist
- Maribel Arrieta, Miss El Salvador 1955, distant Italian ancestry, great-great grandfather was originally from Novi Ligure
- Augusto César Baratta del Vecchio, architect
- Jacinto Bondanza Castro, aviator
- Enrique Borgo Bustamante, Vice President during the administration of Armando Calderón Sol (1994-1999)
- Mauricio Borgonovo Pohl, Minister of Foreign Affairs (1972-1977)
- Napoleón Herson Calitto, military officer
- Roberto Edmundo Canessa, Minister of Foreign Affairs (1950-1954)
- Erick Cabalceta Giacchero, footballer
- Eleonora Carrillo Alammani, Miss El Salvador 1995
- Kiano Falcao Casamalhuapa, footballer
- Gerardo Celasco, actor
- Raúl Corcio, footballer
- Alfredo Cristiani, President of El Salvador (1989-1994)
- Cesare Edoardo D'Antonio, aviator, pilot in command of TACA Flight 390
- Carlos Dárdano, aviator, pilot in command of TACA Flight 110
- Antonio Ferracuti, olympic swimmer
- Carmen Ferracuti
- Donatella Ferracuti
- Piero Ferracuti
- Jorge Ismael García Corleto, writer
- Isabella García-Manzo, Miss El Salvador 2023
- Porfirio Giammattei Machon, paternal grandfather of Guatemalan president Alejandro Giammattei
- Angelo Iannuzzelli, olympic athlete
- Jorge Liévano, footballer
- Adolfo Arnoldo Majano, military figure
- María José Marenco, athlete
- Enrico Massi, aviator
- Conrado Miranda Sasso, footballer
- Francesca Miranda, fashion designer
- Gabriel Núñez D'Alessandro, footballer
- Richard Oriani, scientist
- Francisco Palaviccini, composer and singer
- Ricardo Poma, businessman, paternal grandmother is Genoese
- Guillermo Ragazzone, footballer
- José Rosi, Colonial mayor of San Salvador
- María Elisa Soler y Borghi, mother of Carlo Emanuele Ruspoli, 3rd Duke of Morignano
- Cosma Spessotto, priest
- Elena Tedesco, Nuestra Belleza El Salvador World 2009
- Marcelo Tejeda Brugnoli, footballer
- Carbilio Tomasino, football coach
- Ricardo Tomasino, footballer
- Emerson Umaña Corleto, footballer
- Larissa Vega Graniello, Nuestra Belleza El Salvador World 2014
- Giulia Zanoni Garcia, Miss Universo El Salvador 2025
- Elizabeth Zaragoza Guerrini, long distance runner

== See also ==
- Italian diaspora

== Bibliography ==
- Favero, Luigi; Tassello, Graziano. Cent'anni di emigrazione italiana (1861 - 1961). CSER. Roma, 1981. (In Italian)
