= Zamparelli =

Zamparelli is an Italian surname. Notable people with the surname include:

- Dino Zamparelli (born 1992), British racing driver
- Elsa Zamparelli (born 1944), American costume designer
- Gina Zamparelli (1959–2018), American concert promoter
- Jennifer Zamparelli (born 1980), Irish comedian, television presenter and radio presenter
- Mario Armond Zamparelli (1921–2012), American artist
- Miriam Zamparelli (born 1941), Puerto Rican sculptor
