= Miss El Salvador =

Beauty pageant

Organización Miss El Salvador
- Formation: 1954; 72 years ago
- Type: Beauty pageant
- Headquarters: San Salvador
- Location: El Salvador
- Members: Miss Universe; Miss World; Miss Cosmo
- Official language: Spanish
- President: Carlos Jiménez
- Website: reinadodeelsalvador.com

Miss de El Salvador is a national beauty pageant in El Salvador where various winners compete at Miss Universe pageant.

== History ==
The Miss El Salvador was the organization in charge of choosing the representative to Miss Universe. The organization since its birth sent a representative to Miss Universe (except in 1980) and Miss World (from 1975 to 1993, when the organization lost the franchise.) The organization was headed by Mr. Eddie González, who was the committed to put El Salvador at the international mark. The format of the competition was based on a representative from each of the 14 departments in the country. During the 1980s due to the Salvadorian Civil War situation, thanks to the special permission granted by The Miss Universe Organization, the representative was chosen behind closed doors. This continued till 1995 when they resumed the national competition.

=== Nuestra Belleza El Salvador 2004–2019 ===
After Miss El Salvador stopped to produce the pageant, in 2004, Telecorporacion Salvadorena acquired the franchise for Miss World, and in 2006 acquired the franchise for Miss Universe. The pageant was renamed Nuestra Belleza El Salvador and held two separate pageants to select the delegates to Miss Universe and Miss World. In 2010, the format changed as in that year they decided to select the two representatives in just one pageant. The pageant is open to any girls throughout the whole country. They choose the finalists via casting specials and the contestants are not required to have won a department title, which was the traditional way until 2005. The license for Miss Universe was given to the organization Reinado de El Salvador in March 2017 and the Miss World licensee in November 2018.

=== Reinado de El Salvador 2007–2022 ===
In 2007, the "Reinado de El Salvador" organization was founded and held the licenses for various international beauty pageants, most notably, Miss International and Miss Earth. Eventually each license was dropped as the year went by. In 2017, the organization was granted the license of Miss Universe and subsequently in 2018, acquired the license of Miss World. Depending on the year, the organization would organize different national beauty pageants where the winner would compete at perspective international beauty pageant or held one contest where various winners were selected.

In 2023, the country of El Salvador hosted the Miss Universe pageant with the sponsorship of the government. As a result, the pageant during this year was dubbed "Miss El Salvador" due to the government appointing organizers to organize the pageant. During this year, the winner also received training in the Dominican Republic by the national director of Miss Universe in the Dominican Republic, Magali Febles.

== Miss Universe ==
On 14 January 2023, the Salvadoran president Nayib Bukele announced that the country would host the 72nd Miss Universe pageant. The last time the country hosted the international pageant was in 1975.

== Titles ==
Number of wins from Miss El Salvador (past licenses)
Pageant	Wins
Miss Universe	0
Miss World	0
Miss International	0
Miss Earth	0

Number of wins from Miss El Salvador (current licenses)
Pageant	Wins
Miss Universe	0
Miss World	0

Note that the year designates the time Miss El Salvador has acquired that particular pageant franchise.

== Franchise holders in El Salvador ==
- 1954 Miss El Salvador – Eddie González
- 2004 Nuestra Belleza de El Salvador – Telecorporación Salvadoreña. Raúl Domínguez
- 2017–2023 Reinado de El Salvador – Carlos Jiménez
- 2024–Present Miss Universe El Salvador – Magali Febles

== Titleholders ==
Year	Miss El Salvador
1954	Myrna Roz Orozco
1955	Maribel Arrieta Galvez
1964	María Herma Hernández-Lazo
1972	Ruth Eugenia Romero Ramírez
1973	Gloria Ivete Romero
1974	Ana Carlota Margarita Araujo
1975	Carmen Elena Figueroa
1976	Mireya Carolina Calderón Tovar
1977	Altagracia Arévalo
1978	Iris Ivette Mazorra Castro
1979	Ivette López Lagos
1981	Martha Alicia Ortiz
1982	Jeannette Orietta Marroquín
1983	Claudia Denisse Oliva Alberto
1984	Ana Lorena Samayoa
1985	Julia Haydée Mora Alfaro
1986	Vicky Elizabeth Cañas Álvarez
1987	Virna Passelly Machuca
1988	Ana Margarita Vaquerano Celarie
1989	Lucía Beatriz López Rodríguez
1990	Gracia María Guerra
1991	Rebeca Dávila Dada
1992	Melissa Salazar
1993	Kathy Méndez Cuéllar
1994	Claudia Méndez Cuéllar
1995	Eleonora Beatrice Carrillo Alamanni
1996	Carmen Milena Mayorga
1997	Carmen Irene Carrillo Vilanova
1998	Maria Gabriela Joviel Munguía
1999	Cynthia Carolina Cevallos Montoya
2000	Alexandra María Rivas Cruz
2001	Diana Betsy Guerrero
2002	Elisa Sandoval Rodríguez
2003	Diana Renée Valdivieso Dubón
2004	Silvia Gabriela Mejía Córdova
2005	Irma Marina Dimas Pineda
2006	Grace Marie Zabaneh Menéndez; Selected by another organization
2006	Rebecca Iraheta
2007	Lissette Rodríguez Alfaro
2008	Rebeca Moreno
2009	Jacquelin Mayella Mena Mahomar
2010	Sonia Yesenia Cruz Ayala
2011	Alejandra Ochoa; Did not compete
2012	Ana Yancy Clavel Espinoza
2013	Alba Maricela Delgado Rubio
2014	Claudia Patricia Murillo Ramos
2015	Fátima Idubina Rivas Opico
2016	Ana Cortez
2017	Allison Ivonne Flores Abarca
2018	Marisela de Montecristo
2019	Zuleika Soler Aragón
2020	Vanessa Velásquez
2021	Alejandra María Gavidia García
2022	Alejandra Guajardo Sada
2023	Isabella García-Manzo
2024	Florence García
2025	Giulia Zanoni

== Titleholders under Miss El Salvador org. ==
=== Miss Universe El Salvador ===
- : Declared as Winner
- : Ended as runner-up or top 5/6 qualification
- : Ended as one of the finalists or semifinalists
- : Ended as special awards winner

The main winner of Miss El Salvador represents El Salvador at Miss Universe pageant. On occasion, when the winner does not qualify (due to age) for either contest, a runner-up is sent.

Year	Department	Miss El Salvador	Placement at Miss Universe	Special awards
2026	San Salvador	Sofía Córdova		
2025	La Unión	Giulia Zanoni	Unplaced	
2024	San Miguel	Florence García	Unplaced	
2023	San Salvador	Isabella García-Manzo	Top 10	
2022	Cabañas	Alejandra Guajardo Sada	Unplaced	
2021	San Salvador	Alejandra María Gavidia García	Unplaced	
2020	San Salvador	Vanessa Velásquez	Unplaced	
2019	La Unión	Zuleika Soler Aragón	Unplaced	
2018	San Salvador	Marisela de Montecristo	Unplaced	
2017	San Salvador	Allison Ivonne Flores Abarca	Unplaced	
2016	Did not compete			
2015	San Salvador	Fátima Idubina Rivas Opico	Unplaced	
2014	Sonsonate	Claudia Patricia Murillo Ramos	Unplaced	
2013	San Salvador	Alba Maricela Delgado Rubio	Unplaced	
2012	San Salvador	Ana Yancy Clavel Espinoza	Unplaced	
2011	San Salvador	Mayra Graciela Aldana Najarro ∆	Unplaced	
2010	San Salvador	Sonia Yesenia Cruz Ayala	Unplaced	
2009	San Salvador	Jacquelin Mayella Mena Mahomar	Unplaced	
2008	San Salvador	Rebeca Moreno	Unplaced	Miss Congeniality
2007	San Salvador	Lissette Rodríguez Alfaro	Unplaced	
2006	San Salvador	Rebecca Iraheta	Unplaced	
2005	Sonsonate	Irma Marina Dimas Pineda	Unplaced	
2004	Sonsonate	Silvia Gabriela Mejía Córdova	Unplaced	
2003	Ahuachapán	Diana Renée Valdivieso Dubón	Unplaced	
2002	La Unión	Elisa Sandoval Rodríguez	Unplaced	
2001	Santa Ana	Grace Marie Zabaneh Menéndez	Unplaced	
2000	San Salvador	Alexandra Maria Rivas Cruz	Unplaced	
1999	San Salvador	Cynthia Carolina Cevallos Montoya	Unplaced	
1998	San Salvador	Maria Gabriela Joviel Munguía	Unplaced	
1997	San Salvador	Carmen Irene Carrillo Vilanova	Unplaced	
1996	San Salvador	Carmen Milena Mayorga	Top 10	
1995	San Salvador	Eleonora Beatrice Corrillo Alamanni	Top 10	
1994	San Salvador	Claudia Méndez Cuéllar	Unplaced	
1993	San Salvador	Kathy Méndez Cuéllar	Unplaced	
1992	San Salvador	Melissa Salazar	Unplaced	
1991	San Salvador	Rebeca Dávila Dada	Unplaced	
1990	San Salvador	Gracia María Guerra	Unplaced	
1989	San Salvador	Lucía Beatriz López Rodríguez	Unplaced	
1988	San Salvador	Ana Margarita Vaquerano Celarie	Unplaced	
1987	San Salvador	Virna Passelly Machuca	Unplaced	
1986	San Salvador	Vicky Elizabeth Cañas Álvarez	Unplaced	
1985	San Salvador	Julia Haydée Mora Alfaro	Unplaced	
1984	San Salvador	Ana Lorena Samayoa	Unplaced	
1983	San Salvador	Claudia Denisse Oliva Alberto	Unplaced	
1982	San Salvador	Jeannette Orietta Marroquín	Unplaced	
Did not compete between 1980–1981
1979	San Salvador	Judith Ivette López Lagos	Unplaced	
1978	San Salvador	Iris Ivette Mazorra Castro	Unplaced	
1977	San Salvador	Altagracia Arévalo	Unplaced	
1976	San Salvador	Mireya Carolina Calderón Tovar	Unplaced	
1975	San Salvador	Carmen Elena Figueroa	Top 12	
1974	San Salvador	Ana Carlota Margarita Araujo	Unplaced	
1973	San Salvador	Gloria Ivete Romero	Unplaced	
1972	San Salvador	Ruth Eugenia Romero Ramírez	Unplaced	
Did not compete between 1956–1971
1955	San Salvador	Maribel Arrieta Gálvez	1st Runner-up	Miss Congeniality
1954	San Salvador	Myrna Ros Orozco	Unplaced	

∆ Designated – The main winner, Alejandra Ochoa withdrew from Miss Universe, due to accident.

=== Miss World El Salvador ===
- : Declared as Winner
- : Ended as runner-up or top 5/6 qualification
- : Ended as one of the finalists or semifinalists
- : Ended as special awards winner

The second title called Miss World El Salvador represents El Salvador at Miss World pageant. On occasion, when the title does not qualify (due to age) for either contest, another delegate is sent.

Year	Department	Miss World El Salvador	Placement at Miss World	Special awards
2026	Usulután	Andrea Rivas	TBA	
2025	Santa Ana	Sofía Estupinián	Unplaced	
2024	Did not compete			
2023	San Salvador	Andrea Aguilar	Unplaced	
2022	Miss World 2021 was rescheduled to 16 March 2022 due to the COVID-19 pandemic outbreak in Puerto Rico, no edition started in 2022.			
2021	San Salvador	Nicole Álvarez	Unplaced	
2020	Due to the impact of COVID-19 pandemic, no competition held.			
2019	Santa Tecla	Fátima Mangandí	Unplaced	
2018	Santa Ana	Metzi Solano	Unplaced	
2017	San Salvador	Fátima Cuéllar	Top 15	

== See also ==
- Reinado de El Salvador
- Miss Grand El Salvador
- Mister El Salvador
