= Nuestra Belleza El Salvador =

Nuestra Belleza Mundo El Salvador
- Formation: 1954
- Type: Beauty pageant
- Headquarters: San Salvador
- Location: El Salvador
- Members: Miss World
- Official language: Spanish
- Franchise holder: Telecorporacion Salvadorena
- Key people: Raúl Domínguez
- Website: www.nbelsalvador.com

Nuestra Belleza Mundo El Salvador was a national Beauty pageant in El Salvador. The winner represented El Salvador at Miss World. Between 2006 - 2015, the winner was given the title of Nuestra Belleza Universo and competed at Miss Universe.

== History ==
=== Miss El Salvador (1972 – 2005) ===
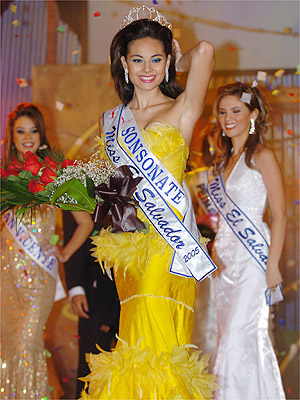
Miss El Salvador 2005: Irma Dimas

Miss El Salvador was the organization in charge of choosing the representative to Miss Universe and Miss World. The organization since its birth sent a representative to Miss Universe (except in 1980) and Miss World (from 1975 to 1993, when the organization lost the franchise.) The organization was headed by Mr. Eddie González, who was the committed to put El Salvador at the international mark. The format of the competition was based on a representative from each of the 14 departments in the country. During the 1980s due to the Salvadorian Civil War situation, thanks to the special permission granted by The Miss Universe Organization, the representative was chosen behind closed doors. This continued till 1995 when they resumed the national competition.

In 2005, the organization had problems renewing the franchise and lost it.

=== Nuestra Belleza El Salvador ===
In 2004, Telecorporacion Salvadorena acquired the franchise for Miss World, and in 2006 acquired the franchise for Miss Universe. The pageant was renamed Nuestra Belleza El Salvador and held two separate pageants to select the delegates to Miss Universe and Miss World. In 2010, the format changed as in that year they decided to select the two representatives in just one pageant. The pageant is open to any girls throughout the whole country. They choose the finalists via casting specials and the contestants are not required to have won a department title, which was the traditional way until 2005. The licensee for Miss Universe was given to the organization Reinado de El Salvador in March 2017 and the Miss World licensee in November 2018.

== Titleholders ==
=== 1954-2005 ===
The Miss El Salvador titleholders represented El Salvador at the Miss Universe competition.

Year	Miss El Salvador
1954	Myrna Roz Orozco
1955	Maribel Arrieta Gálvez
1964	María Herma Hernández-Lazo
1972	Ruth Eugenia Romero Ramírez
1973	Gloria Ivete Romero
1974	Ana Carlota Margarita Araujo
1975	Carmen Elena Figueroa
1976	Mireya Carolina Calderón Tovar
1977	Altagracia Arévalo
1978	Iris Ivette Mazorra Castro
1979	Ivette López Lagos
1981	Martha Alicia Ortiz
1982	Jeannette Orietta Marroquín
1983	Claudia Denisse Oliva Alberto
1984	Ana Lorena Samayoa
1985	Julia Haydée Mora Alfaro
1986	Vicky Elizabeth Cañas Álvarez
1987	Virna Passelly Machuca
1988	Ana Margarita Vaquerano Celarie
1989	Lucía Beatriz López Rodríguez
1990	Gracia María Guerra
1991	Rebeca Dávila Dada
1992	Melissa Salazar
1993	Kathy Méndez Cuéllar
1994	Claudia Méndez Cuéllar
1995	Eleonora Beatrice Carrillo Alammani
1996	Milena Mayorga
1997	Carmen Irene Carrillo Vilanova
1998	María Gabriela Joviel Munguía
1999	Cynthia Carolina Montoya
2000	Alexandra María Rivas Cruz
2001	Diana Betsy Guerrero
2002	Elisa Sandoval Rodríguez
2003	Diana Renée Valdivieso Dubón
2004	Silvia Gabriela Mejía Córdova
2005	Irma Marina Dimas Pineda
Others	Grace Marie Zabaneh Menéndez

=== 2006-2019 ===
The Miss El Salvador renamed as Nuestra Belleza El Salvador and went to Miss Universe and second placed went to Miss World until 2015. Since the owner of Nuestra Belleza El Salvador does not hold a contest in 2016, the franchise of Miss Universe moved to Reinado de El Salvador Organization and the appointment system inside of Nuestra Belleza El Salvador allows the casting winner to go to Miss World.

Year	Nuestra Belleza El Salvador
2006	Rebecca Iraheta
2007	Lissette Rodríguez
2008	Rebeca Moreno
2009	Mayella Mena
2010	Sonia Cruz
2011	Alejandra Ochoa
2012	Ana Yancy Clavel
2013	Alba Delgado
2014	Patricia Murillo
2015	Idubina Rivas
2016	Ana Cortez
2017	Fátima Cúellar
2018	Marisela de Montecristo
2019	Zuleika Soler

== Representatives in Big Four pageants ==
The following women have represented El Salvador in three of the Big Four major international beauty pageants for women. These are Miss World, Miss Universe, Miss International with exception of Miss Earth which has a separate national franchise in El Salvador.

=== Representatives at Miss Universe ===
Color key

- Declared as Winner
- Ended as runner-up
- Ended as one of the finalists or semifinalists

The official winner of Nuestra Belleza El Salvador competed at the Miss Universe pageant between 2006 - 2017. On occasion, when the winner did not qualify (due to age) for either contest, a runner-up was sent. In 1954 and 1955 the representatives were handpicked, with the exception in 1981, where the winner was sent to Miss World. In 2006, Nuestra Belleza El Salvador acquired the Miss Universe franchise and started crowning two titleholders, one for Miss Universe and another for Miss World, in separate pageants until 2010 when the pageants were merged. Since 2010, two titleholders were crowned at the same event. But in 2017, the organization gave up the franchise license of Miss Universe and only one titleholder would be crowned to compete at Miss World.

Year	Miss El Salvador	Placement	Special Awards
1954	Myrna Roz Orozco	Unplaced	
1955	Maribel Arrieta Gálvez	1st Runner-up	Miss Congeniality
1972	Ruth Eugenia Romero Ramírez	Unplaced	
1973	Gloria Ivete Romero	Unplaced	
1974	Ana Carlota Margarita Araujo	Unplaced	
1975	Carmen Elena Figueroa	Top 12	
1976	Mireya Carolina Calderón Tovar	Unplaced	
1977	Altagracia Arévalo	Unplaced	
1978	Iris Ivette Mazorra Castro	Unplaced	
1979	Judith Ivette López Lagos	Unplaced	
1981	Martha Alicia Ortiz	Did not compete	
1982	Jeannette Orietta Marroquín	Unplaced	
1983	Claudia Denisse Oliva Alberto	Unplaced	
1984	Ana Lorena Samayoa	Unplaced	
1985	Julia Haydée Mora Maza	Unplaced	Miss Media
1986	Vicky Elizabeth Cañas Álvarez	Unplaced	
1987	Virna Passelly Machuca	Unplaced	
1988	Ana Margarita Vaquerano Celarie	Unplaced	
1989	Lucia Beatriz López Rodríguez	Unplaced	
1990	Gracia María Guerra	Unplaced	
1991	Rebeca Dávila Dada	Unplaced	
1992	Melissa Salazar	Unplaced	
1993	Kathy Méndez Cuéllar	Unplaced	
1994	Claudia Méndez Cuéllar	Unplaced	
1995	Eleonora Beatrice Carrillo Alammani	Top 10	
1996	Milena Mayorga	Top 10	
1997	Carmen Irene Carrillo Vilanova	Unplaced	
1998	María Gabriela Joviel Munguía	Unplaced	
1999	Cynthia Carolina Montoya	Unplaced	
2000	Alexandra María Rivas Cruz	Unplaced	
2001	Diana Betsy Guerrero	Unplaced	
2002	Elisa Sandoval Rodríguez	Unplaced	
2003	Diana Renée Valdivieso Dubón	Unplaced	
2004	Silvia Gabriela Mejía Córdova	Unplaced	
2005	Irma Marina Dimas Pineda	Unplaced	
2006	Rebecca Iraheta	Unplaced	
2007	Lissette Rodríguez	Unplaced	
2008	Rebeca Moreno	Unplaced	Miss Congeniality
2009	Mayella Mena	Unplaced	
2010	Sonia Cruz	Unplaced	
2011	Mayra Aldana*	Unplaced	
2012	Ana Yancy Clavel	Unplaced	
2013	Alba Delgado	Unplaced	
2014	Patricia Murillo	Unplaced	
2015	Idubina Rivas**	Unplaced	

- (*) 2011: Due to personal accident, Alejandra Ochoa (Original winner) was replaced by Mayra Aldana (2nd Runner-up).
- (**) 2015: Nuestra Belleza is postponed. Idubina Rivas was appointed as Miss Universe El Salvador 2015 by National Director of Miss Universe in El Salvador. She was the winner of Reinado de El Salvador 2014.

=== Representatives at Miss World ===
In 1978 and 1979, the winner of Miss El Salvador competed at both Miss Universe and Miss World pageants. Since 2006, the representative for Miss Universe and Miss World were crowned at the same event. But in 2017, only one titleholder would be crown, since the company lost the Miss Universe franchise.

Year	Miss El Salvador	Placement	Special Awards
1975	Ana Stella Coman Durán	Unplaced	
1976	Soraya Comandari Zanotti	Unplaced	
1977	Magaly Varela Rivera	Unplaced	
1978	Iris Ivette Mazorra Castro	Unplaced	
1979	Judith Ivette Lopez Lagos	Unplaced	
1982	Loredana Munguía	Unplaced	
1983	Carmen Irene Álvarez Gallardo	Unplaced	
1984	Celina María López Párraga	Unplaced	
1985	Luz del Carmen Mena Duke	Unplaced	
1986	Nadine Monique Gutiérrez	Unplaced	
1987	Claudia Lorena Alvarenga Ruiz	Unplaced	
1988	Karla Lorena Hasbún	Unplaced	
1989	Ana Estela Aguilar	Unplaced	
1990	María Elena Henríquez	Unplaced	
1991	Lucía Beatriz López Rodríguez	Unplaced	
1992	Raquel Cristina Durán	Unplaced	
1993	Beatriz Eugenia Henríquez Pinto	Unplaced	
2004	Andrea Denise Charlaix	Unplaced	
2005	Alejandra Mirian Cárcamo	Unplaced	
2006	Evelyn Romero	Unplaced	
2007	Silvia Melhado	Unplaced	
2008	Gabriela Gavidia	Unplaced	
2009	Elena Tedesco	Unplaced	
2010	Gabriela Molina	Unplaced	
2012	Maria Luisa Vicuña	Unplaced	
2013	Paola Ayala	Unplaced	
2014	Larissa Vega	Unplaced	
2015	Marcela Santamaría*	Unplaced	
2016	Ana Cortez*	Unplaced	
2017	Fátima Cuéllar*	Top 15	

- (*) 2015: Nuestra Belleza is postponed. Marcela Santamaría was appointed as Miss World El Salvador 2015 She was the winner of Reinado de El Salvador 2011.
- (*) 2016: Ana Cortez was appointed to represent El Salvador at Miss World 2016.
- (*) 2017: Fátima Cuéllar was appointed to represent El Salvador at Miss World 2017.

=== Representatives at Miss International ===
In 1992 the third title of Miss El Salvador will be competing at Miss International pageant. In 2006 Miss El Salvador lost the franchise of the pageant. Nowadays, the official candidate for Miss International will be selecting by Reinado de El Salvador pageant together with some Big Four international beauty pageants.

Year	Miss El Salvador	Placement	Special Awards
1992	María Elena Ferreiro	Unplaced	
1994	Nathalia Gutiérrez Munguía	Unplaced	
1995	Natalia Díaz	Unplaced	
2004	Andrea Hernández	Unplaced	
2005	Ana Saidia Palma Rebollo	Unplaced	
