= Xango =

Xango may refer to:

- XanGo, a company based in Utah that markets a beverage, XanGo juice
- Shango, one of the key orishas of Yoruba mythology
- The name of an Afro-Brazilian religion (also written Xangô)
- "Xangô", a Brazilian song by Luiz Bonfá
- Xango, a brand of menswear designed by Francesca Miranda
