= Mister El Salvador =

Male Beauty pageant

- Formation: 1994
- Type: Male Beauty pageant
- Headquarters: San Salvador
- Location: El Salvador
- Members: Manhunt International; Mister World; Mister Supranational
- Official language: Spanish

Mister El Salvador is a male beauty pageant in El Salvador where various winners compete at international pageants.

== History ==
The first official contestant on Mister El Salvador was Jaime Paz in 1994. Paz participated in Singapore for the Manhunt International pageant.

The format of the competition was based on a representative from each of the 14 departments in the country. The national organization is purposing to spread the values of Salvadoran men to the world, to give support to excel through our personal preparation classes, promote culture, traditions and tourism custumbres our country at international events.

== Titleholders under Mister El Salvador ==
=== Manhunt International El Salvador ===
- : Winner
- : Runner-up
- : Finalist or Semifinalist
- : Special Award Winner

Year	Department	Mister El Salvador	Placement	Special Awards
1995	San Salvador	Jaime Paz	Top 12	
Did not compete between 1996—2020
2022	San Salvador	Gerardo Ojeda	Unplaced	
2024	San Salvador	Andre Ticas	Unplaced	Chat Influencer

=== Mister World El Salvador ===
- : Winner
- : Runner-up
- : Finalist or Semifinalist
- : Special Award Winner

Year	Department	Mister El Salvador	Placement	Special Awards
2016	Ilobasco	David Arias Salinas	Top 10	
2019	San Salvador	David Pivaral	Unplaced	
2024	San Salvador	Josué Molina Zelaya	Unplaced	

=== Mister Supranational El Salvador ===
- : Winner
- : Runner-up
- : Finalist or Semifinalist
- : Special Award Winner

Year	Department	Mister El Salvador	Placement	Special Awards
2022	San Salvador	Adrián Itzam-Na	Top 10	Talent Round (Top 5)

== See also ==
- Miss El Salvador
- Reinado de El Salvador
- Miss Grand El Salvador
