= Miss Universe 1955 =

4th Miss Universe pageant

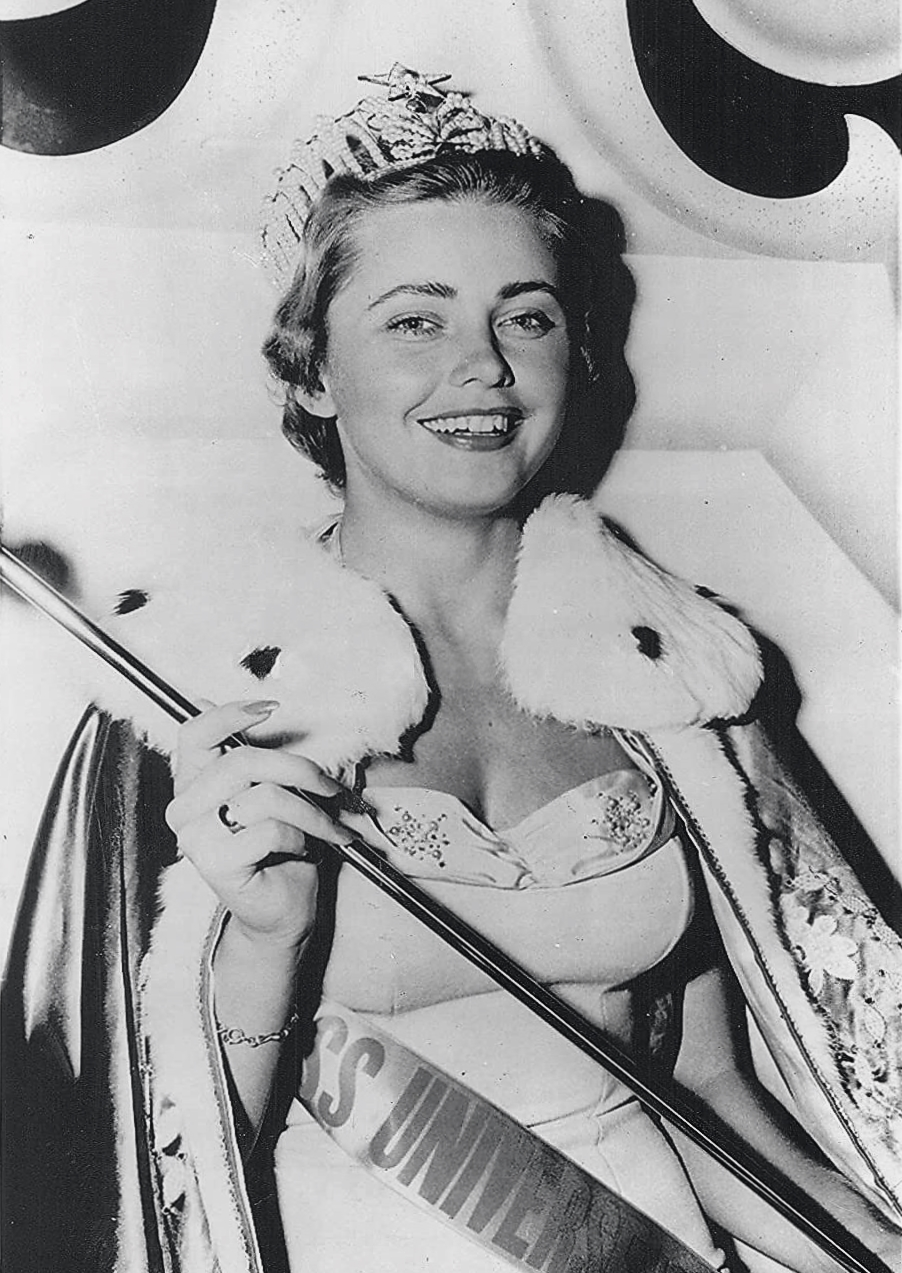
- Hillevi Rombin
- Date: 22 July 1955
- Presenters: Bob Russell
- Venue: Long Beach Municipal Auditorium, Long Beach, California, United States
- Broadcaster: CBS
- Entrants: 33
- Placements: 15
- Debuts: Ceylon; Ecuador; England; Guatemala; Lebanon; Nicaragua
- Withdrawals: Australia; Hong Kong; New Zealand; Panama; Peru; Singapore; Thailand
- Returns: Venezuela
- Winner: Hillevi Rombin; Sweden
- Congeniality: Maribel Arrieta (El Salvador)

Miss Universe 1955 was the fourth Miss Universe pageant, held at the Long Beach Municipal Auditorium in Long Beach, California, on 22 July 1955. This was the first time that the pageant was televised.

At the conclusion of the event, Miriam Stevenson of the United States crowned Hillevi Rombin of the Sweden as Miss Universe 1955. It was the first victory of Sweden in the history of the pageant.

Contestants from thirty-three countries and territories competed in this edition. The pageant was hosted by Bob Russell.

== Background ==
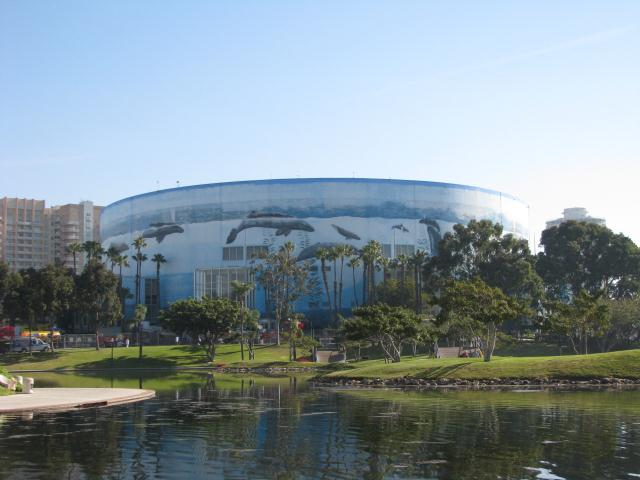
Long Beach Municipal Auditorium, the venue of Miss Universe 1955

=== Selection of participants ===
Contestants from thirty-three countries and territories were selected to compete in the pageant. The age requirement in this edition was still from eighteen to twenty-eight, where women who were married and had children could also participate.

==== Debuts, returns and withdrawals ====
The 1955 edition saw the debuts of Ceylon, Ecuador, England, Guatemala, Lebanon, and Nicaragua, and the return of Venezuela, which last competed in 1953. Australia, Hong Kong, New Zealand, Panama, Peru, Singapore, and Thailand withdrew after their respective organizations failed to hold a national competition or appoint a delegate.

Expected to compete are Consuelo Díaz of Bolivia, Karin Rasmussen of Denmark, Gladir Leopardi of Egypt, Angelina Kalkhoven of Holland, and Suna Soley of Turkey. However, these women withdrew due to undisclosed reasons.

== Results ==
Miss Universe 1955 and her court (from left to right): Margit Nünke, Maribel Arrieta, Maureen Hingert, and Keiko Takahashi.

=== Placements ===
Placement	Contestant
Miss Universe 1955	Sweden – Hillevi Rombin
1st Runner-Up	El Salvador – Maribel Arrieta
2nd Runner-Up	Ceylon – Maureen Hingert
3rd Runner-Up	West Germany – Margit Nünke
4th Runner-Up	Japan – Keiko Takahashi
Top 15	Argentina – Isabel Sarli; Belgium – Nicole de Mayer; Brazil – Emília Barreto; Canada – Cathy Diggles; England – Margaret Rowe; Guatemala – María Molina; Honduras – Pastora Pagán; Norway – Solveig Borstad; United States – Carlene Johnson; Venezuela – Susana Duijm

=== Special awards ===
Award	Contestant
Miss Friendship	El Salvador – Maribel Arrieta
Miss Popular Girl	England – Margaret Rowe
Best Dressed Girl	Nicaragua – Rosa Argentina Lacayo

== Pageant ==
=== Format ===
From sixteen in the previous edition, fifteen semi-finalists were chosen at the preliminary competition that consists of the swimsuit and evening gown competition. Each of the fifteen semi-finalists gave a short speech during the final telecast using their native languages. Afterwards, the fifteen semi-finalists paraded again in their swimsuits and evening gowns, and the five finalists were eventually chosen.

=== Selection committee ===
- Milo Anderson – American movie dress designer
- Myrna Hansen – Miss USA 1953 from Illinois
- Samuel Heavenrich – from the Long Beach Municipal Arts Center
- Tom Kelley – American photographer
- Robert Palmer – American casting director
- George Rony – American author
- Ginny Simms – American actress and singer
- Vincent Trotta – Artistic director of Paramount Pictures
- Alberto Vargas – Peruvian-American painter of pin-up girls
- Earl Wilson – American columnist and journalist
- Roger Zeiler – Co-Founder of the Miss Europe committee and chairman of the French Committee of Elegance

== Contestants ==
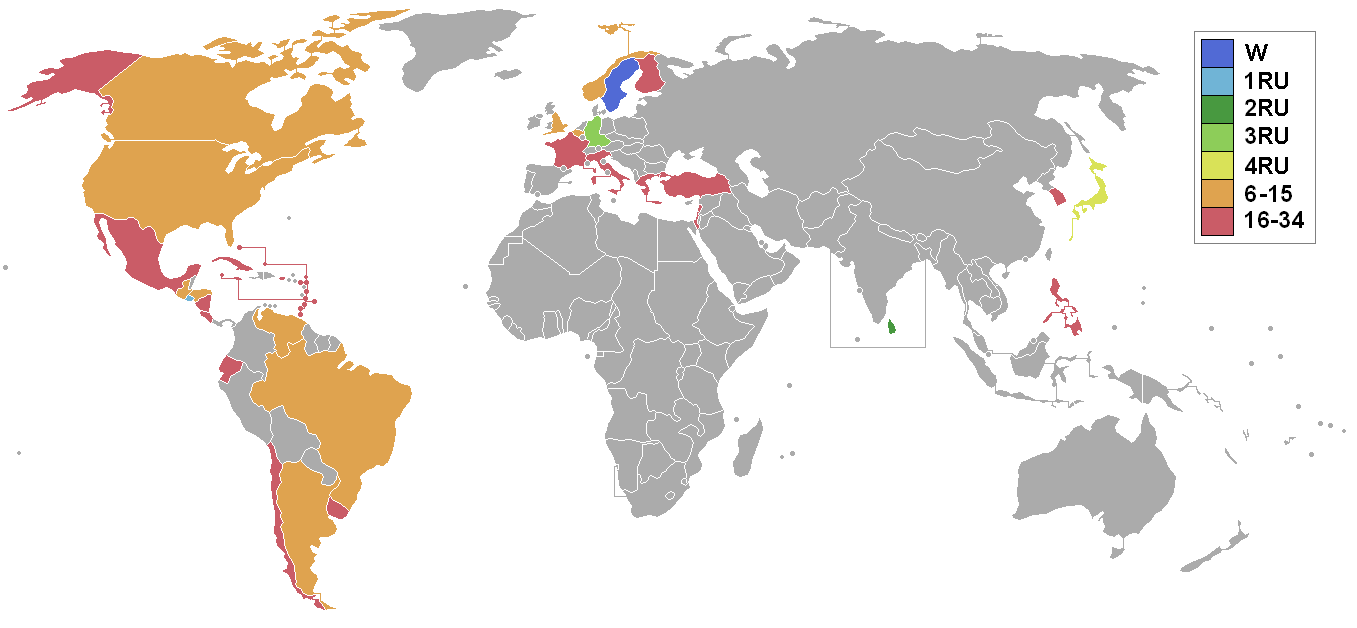
Miss Universe 1955 participating countries and territories

Thirty-three contestants competed for the title.

Country/Territory	Contestant	Age (Note: Ages at the time of the pageant)	Hometown
Alaska	Lorna McLeod	22	Fairbanks
Argentina	Isabel Sarli	25	Buenos Aires
Belgium	Nicole de Mayer	19	Ghent
Brazil	Emília Barreto	21	Fortaleza
Canada	Cathy Diggles	20	Toronto
Ceylon	Maureen Hingert	18	Colombo
Chile	Rosa Merello	18	Santiago
Costa Rica	Clemencia Martínez	22	San José
Cuba	Gilda Marín	26	Havana
Ecuador	Leonor Carcache	21	Guayaquil
El Salvador	Maribel Arrieta	19	San Salvador
England	Margaret Rowe	19	London
Finland	Sirkku Talja	19	Helsinki
France	Claude Petit	18	Aulnay-sous-Bois
Greece	Sonia Zoidou	18	Athens
Guatemala	María Molina	18	Guatemala City
Honduras	Pastora Pagán	18	San Pedro Sula
Israel	Ilana Carmel	19	Bat Yam
Italy	Elena Fancera	20	Rome
Japan	Keiko Takahashi	20	Tokyo
Lebanon	Hanya Beydoun	18	Beirut
Mexico	Yolanda Mayen	18	Tijuana
Nicaragua	Rosa Argentina Lacayo	19	Managua
Norway	Solveig Borstad	23	Oslo
Philippines	Yvonne de los Reyes	19	Manila
Puerto Rico	Laura Betancourt	20	Río Piedras
South Korea	Mee-chong Kim	22	Busan
Sweden	Hillevi Rombin	21	Uppsala
United States	Carlene Johnson	22	Rutland
Uruguay	Inge Hoffmann	19	Montevideo
Venezuela	Susana Duijm	18	Caracas
West Germany	Margit Nünke	24	Cologne
West Indies	Noreen Campbell	18	Port of Spain
