= Miss Grand El Salvador 2023 =

Beauty pageant edition

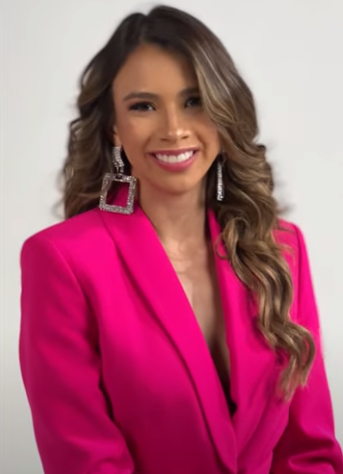
- Fátima Calderón, the winner of the contest
- Date: 29 July 2023
- Presenters: Kerim Handal
- Venue: FEPADE Theater, San Salvador
- Entrants: 14
- Placements: 3
- Winner: Fátima Calderón (La Libertad)

External videos
- Miss Grand El Salvador 2023 Grand Final Competition, on 29 July 2023, YouTube video

Miss Grand El Salvador 2023 or CNB Grand El Salvador 2023 was the inaugural edition of the Miss Grand El Salvador pageant, held on 29 July 2023, at the FEPADE Theater, San Salvador. Candidates from fourteen departments of El Salvador competed for the title, of whom the representative of La Libertad, Fátima Calderón, was named the winner, while Alexia Pacheco of Santa Ana and Naomy Montiel of San Miguel were named the first and second runners-up, respectively.

The winner of the contest, Fátima Calderón, will represent El Salvador at the international pageant, Miss Grand International 2023, to be held in Vietnam on 25 October. Meanwhile, the remaining candidates will compete again on another stage, CNB El Salvador 2023, scheduled for late 2023 when the country representatives for Miss Grand International 2024, Miss International 2024, and Miss Supranational 2024 will be determined.

The pageant was managed by the Certamen Nacional de Belleza El Salvador (CNB El Salvador) chairperson, Francisco Cortez, and its grand final coronation round was hosted by Kerim Handal.

== Result ==
Position	Delegate
Miss Grand El Salvador 2023	La Libertad – Fátima Calderón
1st runner-up	Santa Ana – Alexia Pacheco
2nd runner-up	San Miguel – Naomy Montiel

== Candidates ==
Fourteen candidates confirmed their participation.

- Ahuachapán – Ashley Guardado
- Cabañas – Sayri Rivera
- Chalatenango – Natalia Urías
- Cuscatlán – Yancy Tobías
- La Libertad – Fátima Calderón
- La Paz – Nathaly Pinto
- La Union – Daniela Villalta
- Morazán – Mirna Bonilla
- San Miguel – Naomy Montiel
- San Salvador – Argelia Arévalo
- San Vicente – Jimena Siliezar
- Santa Ana – Alexia Pacheco
- Sonsonate – Gricelda Mercado
- Usulutan – Kimberly Castro
