= The Rawhide Trail =

- Theatrical release poster
- Directed by: Robert Gordon
- Written by: Alexander J. Wells
- Produced by: Earle Lyon
- Starring: Rex Reason; Nancy Gates; Richard Erdman; Ann Doran; Rusty Lane; Maureen Hingert
- Cinematography: Karl Struss
- Edited by: Paul Borofsky
- Music by: André Brummer
- Production companies: Terry & Lyon Productions
- Distributed by: Allied Artists Pictures
- Release date: January 26, 1958
- Running time: 67 minutes
- Country: United States
- Language: English

The Rawhide Trail is a 1958 American Western film directed by Robert Gordon and written by Alexander J. Wells. The film stars Rex Reason, Nancy Gates, Richard Erdman, Ann Doran, Rusty Lane and Maureen Hingert. The film was released on January 26, 1958, by Allied Artists Pictures.

== Cast ==
- Rex Reason as Jess Brady
- Nancy Gates as Marsha Collins
- Richard Erdman as Rupe Pardee
- Ann Doran as Mrs. Cartwright
- Rusty Lane as Captain
- Maureen Hingert as Keetah
- Sam Buffington as James Willard
- Robert Knapp as Farley Durand
- Frank Chase as Corporal
- William Murphy as Elbe Rotter
- John Dierkes as Hangman
- Richard Warren as Collier
- Dick Geary as Soldier
- Chet Sampson as Telegrapher
