= Reinado de El Salvador =

National beauty pageant competition in El Salvador

Reinado de El Salvador Organization
- Formation: 2007; 19 years ago
- Type: Beauty pageant
- Headquarters: San Salvador
- Location: El Salvador
- Members: Miss International; Miss Earth; Miss Supranational
- Official language: Spanish
- President: Carlos Jimenez
- Website: reinadodeelsalvador.com

The Reinado de El Salvador is a national beauty pageant in El Salvador. This pageant is not related to Nuestra Belleza El Salvador pageant.

== History ==
Began in 2007, the Reinado de El Salvador acquired major franchises in El Salvador for women and men. The Reinado El Salvador Organization is purposing to spread the beauty and values of Salvadoran women to the world, to give support to excel through our personal preparation classes, promote culture, traditions, and Tourism custumbres our country in major beauty events worldwide.

In March 2017 the organization acquired the Miss Universe license and in November 2018 also acquired the Miss World license.

== Representatives at international pageants ==
=== Miss International El Salvador ===
- : Declared as Winner
- : Ended as runner-up or top 5/6 qualification
- : Ended as one of the finalists or semifinalists
- : Ended as special awards winner

Reinado de El Salvador sent representatives from 2007 through 2017 to Miss International. Between 1992 and 1995 Miss El Salvador Organization franchised the Miss International to the 2nd Runner-up and an independent selection between 2004 and 2005 as "Miss International El Salvador". The Miss International license is the first major pageant when the Reinado de El Salvador had built a competition in 2007. From 2019 until 2023, Francisco Cortez held the license. In 2024, Magali Febles became the national director.

Year	Department	Miss International El Salvador	Placement at Miss International	Special Awards
2026	San Salvador	Georgina Muñoz	TBA
2025	La Paz	Alva Echegoyen	Unplaced
2024	San Salvador	Luciana Martínez	Unplaced
2023	San Salvador	Daniella Hidalgo	Unplaced
2022	San Salvador	Genesis Fuentes	Unplaced
Due to the impact of COVID-19 pandemic, no competition held between 2020—2021
2019	San Salvador	Elena Batlle	Unplaced
2018	San Salvador	Ena Alicia Cea Cea	Unplaced
2017	San Salvador	Fátima Yolanda Mauricio Mangandi	Unplaced
2016	San Salvador	Margarita Elizabeth Cader Medina	Top 15
2015	San Salvador	Eugenia María Ávalos Ramos	Unplaced
2014	San Salvador	Fátima Idubina Rivas Opico	Unplaced
2013	San Salvador	Yaritza Rivera Barillas	Unplaced
2012	San Salvador	Marlin Ramírez	Unplaced
2011	San Salvador	Marcel Guadalupe Pérez Santamaría	Unplaced
2010	Did not compete
2009	San Salvador	Elisa Vanessa Hueck Martínez	Unplaced
2008	San Salvador	Georgina Cisneros Rangel	Unplaced	Miss Friendship
2007	San Salvador	Ledin Damas	Unplaced

=== Miss Tierra El Salvador ===
- : Declared as Winner
- : Ended as runner-up or top 5/6 qualification
- : Ended as one of the finalists or semifinalists
- : Ended as special awards winner

Year	Department	Miss Earth El Salvador	Placement at Miss Earth	Special Awards
2026	San Salvador	Marisol Echeverría	TBA
2025	San Vicente	Alejandra Pérez	Unplaced
2024	San Salvador	Fátima Cruz	Unplaced
Did not compete between 2016—2023
2015	San Salvador	Pamela Valdivieso Silva	Unplaced
2014	San Salvador	Amalia Georgina González Romero	Unplaced
2013	Did not compete
2012	San Salvador	Yaritza Rivera Barillas	Unplaced
2011	San Salvador	Anita Esmeralda Puertas	Unplaced
2010	Did not compete
2009	San Salvador	Mayra Graciela Aldana Najarro	Unplaced
2008	San Salvador	Claudia Linares Calderón	Unplaced
2007	San Salvador	Julia Iris Ayala Regalado	Unplaced
2006	San Salvador	Ana Flor Astrid Machado	Unplaced
2005	San Salvador	Irma Marina Dimas Pineda	Top 16
2004	San Salvador	Gabriela Mejia	Unplaced
2003	Did not compete
2002	San Salvador	Elisa Sandoval	Unplaced
2001	San Salvador	Grace Marie Zabaneh	Unplaced

=== Miss Supranacional El Salvador ===
- : Declared as Winner
- : Ended as runner-up or top 5/6 qualification
- : Ended as one of the finalists or semifinalists
- : Ended as special awards winner

Year	Department	Miss Supranational El Salvador	Placement at Miss Supranational	Special Awards
2026	San Salvador	Argelia Rodríguez	Unplaced
2025	La Libertad	Verónica Gaytán	Unplaced
2024	San Miguel	Naomy Montiel	Unplaced
2023	Santa Ana	Luciana Martínez	Top 24
2022	Santa Ana	Jennifer Figueroa	Unplaced
2021	San Salvador	Linda Sibrián	Top 24
2018	San Salvador	Katia Mekhi Lobos	Unplaced
2017	San Salvador	Pia Trigueros	Unplaced
2016	Santa Ana	Lissveth Interiano	Unplaced
2015	Santa Ana	Verónica Olivares	Unplaced
2014	San Salvador	Marcela Solórzano García	Unplaced
2013	Santa Ana	Metzi Gabriela Solano Jiménez	Unplaced
2011	San Salvador	Mónica Avelar Hernández	Unplaced

== See also ==
- Miss El Salvador
- Miss Grand El Salvador
- Mister El Salvador
