= Alejandra Guajardo =

Salvadoran beauty pageant titleholder (born 1995)

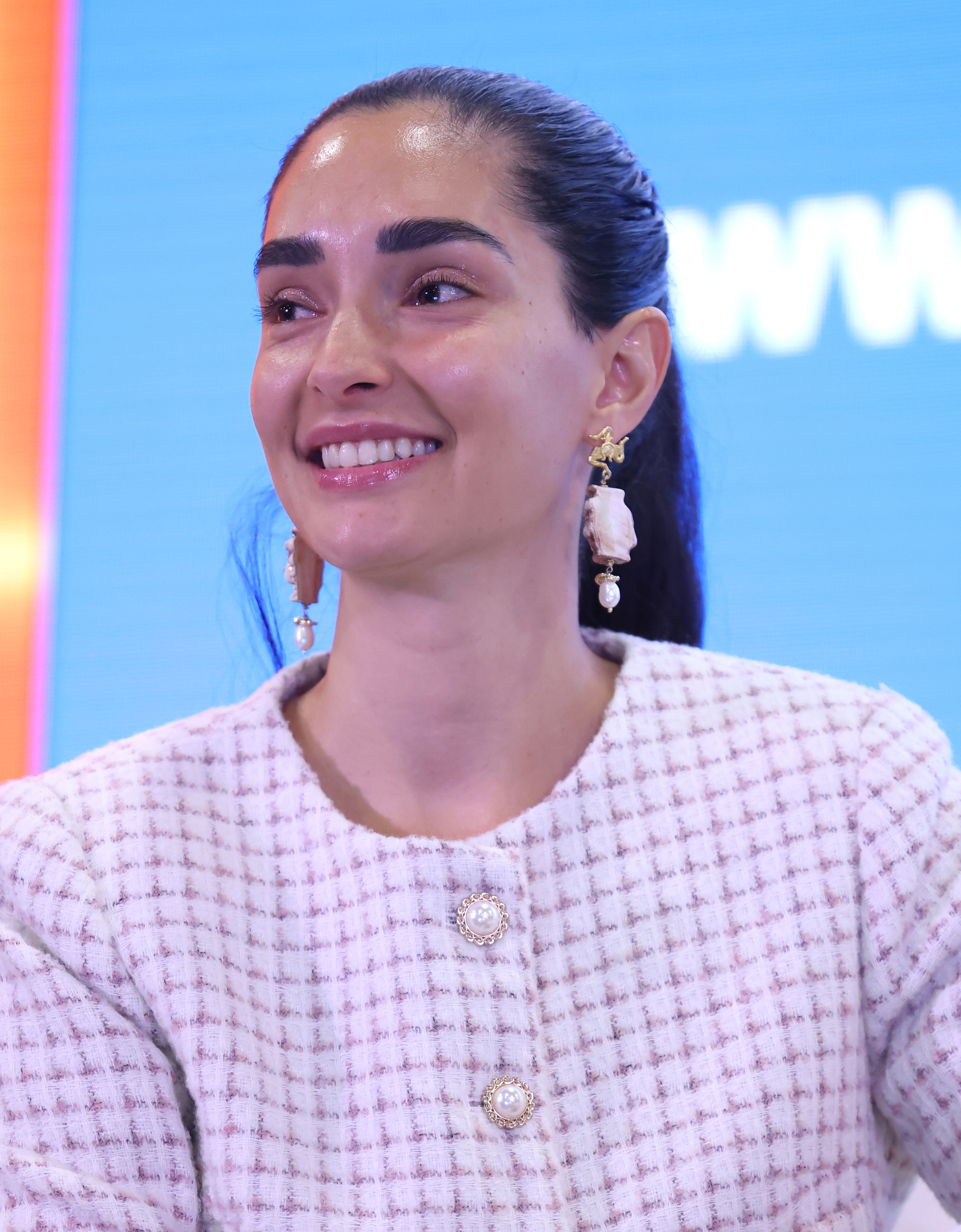
- Born: Alejandra Guajardo Sada; Cancun, Quintana Roo, Mexico
- Beauty pageant titleholder
- Title: Reinado de El Salvador 2022; Miss Charm El Salvador 2024
- Major competitions: Reinado de El Salvador 2022; (Winner); Miss Universe 2022; (Unplaced); Miss Charm 2024; (Top 20)

Alejandra Guajardo Sada is a Salvadoran beauty pageant titleholder who was crowned Miss El Salvador 2022. She represented El Salvador at the Miss Universe 2022 and Miss Charm 2024.

== Pageantry ==
On August 13, 2022, Guajardo represented Cabañas at Miss Universe El Salvador 2022 and competed with 14 other finalists for four titles at the Fundación Empresarial para el Desarrollo Educativo (FEPADE) auditorium in Santa Tecla, El Salvador. She was crowned Miss Universe El Salvador 2022. Guajardo represented El Salvador at Miss Universe 2022 but did not reach the top 16.

In 2024, Guajardo was announced to represent El Salvador at Miss Charm 2024 and reached the top 20.

Awards and achievements
Preceded by First	Miss Charm El Salvador; 2024	Succeeded by Incumbent
