= Jacinto Bondanza Castro =

Lieutenant Jacinto Bondanza Castro
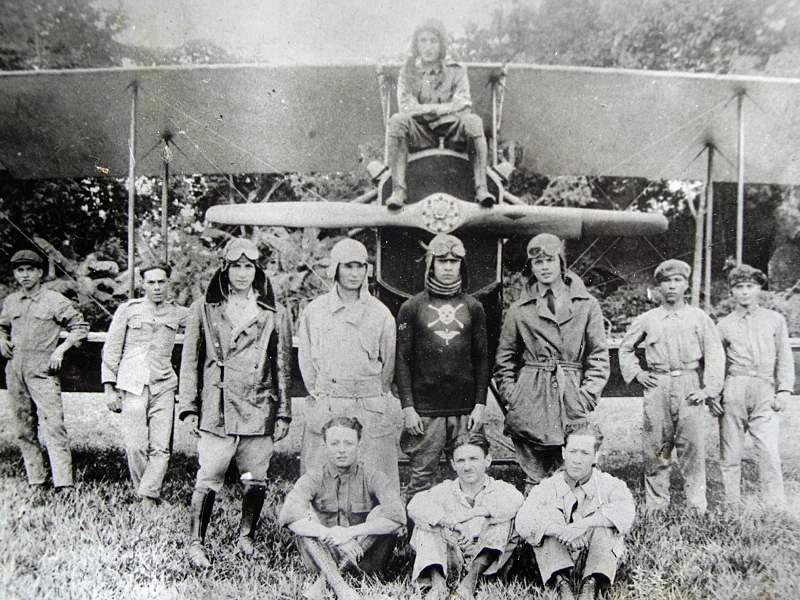
- Jacinto with a group of pilots and mechanics of the new Aviation Corps, 1926
- Born: October 11, 1900; Santa Tecla, La Libertad, El Salvador
- Died: October 8, 1987 (aged 86) Santa Tecla, La Libertad, El Salvador
- Allegiance: El Salvador
- Service: Armed Forces of El Salvador
- Rank: Captain
- Commands: Salvadoran Aviation Corps

Jacinto Bondanza Castro (October 11, 1900 – October 8, 1987) was a pioneering Salvadoran aviator.

== Biography ==
Jacinto Bondanza Castro was born on 11 October 1900 in the city of Santa Tecla, La Libertad to a Southern Italian immigrant father from Naples.

Jacinto had become interested in Aviation during a stay in San Francisco, California and on April 22, 1924 he and his friend Juan Ramón Munés entered Aviation school. On November 29, 1924, Jacinto graduated from the Ilopango Military Aviation School and on December 10, 1924 officially became the second aviator pilot in all of El Salvador and was also awarded the title of Second Lieutenant in the Army. By 1925, he was one of only six qualified pilots in El Salvador.

Jacinto went on to play a crucial role in the early development of the nation's Air Force and was frequently sent to California to obtain aircraft and support.

On New Year Day 1928, American Aviator Charles Lindbergh arrived in El Salvador on the Spirit of St. Louis during his goodwill tour of Latin America. Jacinto was honored with Munés to escort Lindbergh across the country.

He married Rosa Victoria Valle in 1940 and had at least one son Carlos Jacinto Bondanza. He died on 8 October 1987.

== See also ==
- Italian Salvadorans
- Salvadoran Air Force (FAS)
