= Maureen Hingert =

Sri Lankan actress and beauty pageant titleholder (1937–2025)

- Born: Maureen Neliya Hingert; 9 January 1937; Colombo, Sri Lanka
- Died: 29 June 2025 (aged 88); Pasadena, California, U.S.
- Other name: Jana Davi
- Spouses: Mario Armond Zamparelli (m. 1958; div. 1970) William J. Ballard (m. 1976; died 2012)
- Children: Gina Zamparelli and 2 other daughters
- Beauty pageant titleholder
- Title: Miss Ceylon 1955
- Major competitions: Miss Ceylon 1955 (Winner); Miss Universe 1955 (2nd Runner-Up)

Maureen Neliya Ballard (née Hingert; 9 January 1937 – 29 June 2025), also professionally known as Jana Davi, was a Sri Lankan actress, dancer, model and beauty pageant titleholder who was crowned Miss Ceylon 1955 and represented her country at Miss Universe 1955 where she placed 2nd Runner-Up.

== Life and career ==
Hingert was born in Colombo, Ceylon on 9 January 1937. Her parents, Lionel Hingert and Lorna Mabel del Run, were of Dutch Burgher ancestry. Her father was an employee of the Bank of Ceylon with extensive tea holdings. Hingert attended school at the Holy Family Convent in Bambalapitiya, Colombo until she was eighteen and continued her college education in Los Angeles, California in the United States.

In 1955, Hingert was crowned Miss Ceylon and subsequently selected as a contestant in Miss Universe 1955 pageant. She was the first Ceylonese representative to win an award at the Miss Universe pageant, after finishing as the second runner-up. Due to her high placement in the contest, she was revered as "putting Ceylon on the map" and being an ambassador for her country, Ceylon (now known as Sri Lanka).

She was also a dancer, and gave solo performances at the Shrine Auditorium in Los Angeles and other major Los Angeles venues.

=== Personal life and death ===
Hingert married an American designer and artist Mario Armond Zamparelli in 1958. Zamparelli was best known for his work as designer of Howard Hughes's empire. The couple had three daughters, one of whom – Gina Zamparelli (died 2018) – achieved fame in arts and entertainment and was active in the field of historic preservation.

In July 1970, Hingert divorced Zamparelli, and in 1976 she married William J. Ballard in Los Angeles, United States. Ballard died in 2012.

Hingert died of liver failure in Pasadena, California, on 29 June 2025, at the age of 88.

== Filmography ==
Following the Miss Universe contest, Hingert was contracted to Universal International Studios and 20th Century Fox. Some of the movies she appeared in include The King and I, Fort Bowie, Gun Fever, The Adventures of Hiram Holiday, Moroccan Halk Moth, Pillars of the Sky, Dangerous Search, Gunmen from Laredo, The Rawhide Trail and the British TV Series Captain David Grief. She was sometimes billed in films as Jana Davi.

Awards and achievements
Preceded by Jeannette de Jonk	Miss Universe Sri Lanka; 1955	Succeeded by Camellia Rosalia Perera
