= Larissa Vega =

- Born: Larissa Marianna Vega Graniello; August 5, 1993 (age 33); Santa Ana, El Salvador
- Height: 1.73 m (5 ft 8 in)
- Beauty pageant titleholder
- Title: Nuestra Belleza El Salvador 2014 (Miss Mundo El Salvador)
- Hair color: Blonde
- Eye color: Brown
- Major competitions: Nuestra Belleza El Salvador 2014 (Second place); Miss World 2014 (Unplaced)

Larissa Marianna Vega Graniello is a Salvadoran model and beauty pageant titleholder who won Miss El Salvador 2014 and competed at Miss World 2014. She is currently the presenter of the morning show Viva la mañana.
