= Fort Bowie (film) =

1958 film by Howard W. Koch

- Theatrical release poster
- Directed by: Howard W. Koch
- Screenplay by: Maurice Tombragel
- Produced by: Aubrey Schenck
- Starring: Ben Johnson; Jan Harrison; Kent Taylor; Maureen Hingert; Peter Mamakos; Larry Chance
- Cinematography: Carl E. Guthrie
- Edited by: John A. Bushelman
- Music by: Les Baxter
- Production companies: Aubrey Schenck Productions; Bel-Air Productions
- Distributed by: United Artists
- Release date: February 1, 1958
- Running time: 81 minutes
- Country: United States
- Language: English

Fort Bowie is a 1958 American Western film directed by Howard W. Koch and written by Maurice Tombragel. The film stars Ben Johnson, Jan Harrison, Kent Taylor, Maureen Hingert, Peter Mamakos and Larry Chance. The film was released on February 1, 1958, by United Artists.

== Plot ==
When Major Wharton's ruthless and cruel killings of Apache Indians leaves him convinced a counterattack by the Apache war chief Victorio is inevitable, Captain Thomas "Tomahawk" Thompson reports his conclusion to Colonel Garrett, his commanding officer. To get him out of the way while Wharton, an ambitious schemer, tries to arrange to murder Victorio's tribe, Garrett assigns a task to Thompson: Safely escorting the colonel's wife, Alison, who had walked out on him, from Tucson to Fort Bowie.

Alison attempts to seduce Thompson along the road to Fort Bowie. Rejected and irate, she lies to her husband, claiming she and Thompson became lovers. Garrett immediately gives Thompson the suicide mission of riding into Indian territory and attempting to make peace with Victorio. Chanzana, a half-blood native girl, once Victorio's lover and who now works in the fort's laundry, fancies Thompson. She goes along to guide him to Victorio. He and Vitorio speak; the chief rejects Colonel Garrett's ultimatum of surrender or perish. Chanzana frees him and his sergeant when Victorio's Indians take them captive with the intention of torturing them to death. The three successfully escape and head for Fort Bowie.

Major Wharton leads most of the troops at Fort Bowie out to attack Victorio, but they are themselves surrounded and wiped out. Thompson, Chanzana, and Sergeant Major Kukas come on the scene of the massacre and realize the fort is in deadly danger. Captain Thompson dispatches Kukas to find two troops of cavalry he knows the Colonel has sent on patrol and bring them back to Fort Bowie ASAP. The sergeant major locates one troop and brings them to Thompson and they ride hard for the fort. Thompson asks his would-be paramour to wait in concealment as they ride out. Instead, she follows the horse soldiers at a distance.

Fort Bowie braces for a battle Colonel Garrett fears they cannot win. Alison apologizes to the colonel for lying about Thompson as the fort prepares for Victorio's attack. Outnumbered, the soldiers fight valiantly but cannot hold the walls, falling back into the mess hall where they make a final stand. In a curious reversal of roles, the Apaches now man Fort Bowie's walls as the cavalry attack and retake the walls and the watchtowers.

Victorio loses many of his braves to the "soldier coats" firing from cover before attempting to break into the mess. He and Captain Thompson engage in single combat, Victorio's bowie knife against Thompson's tomahawk. Victorio is killed as the fort is retaken by the cavalry Thompson brought to its aid.

When the dust settles, Thompson realizes he is as in love with Chanzana as she is with him. The two of them kiss "as soldiers kiss their wives," a promise for the future, as the sergeant major watches with a knowing smile.

== Cast ==
- Ben Johnson as Capt. Thomas Thompson
- Kent Taylor as Col. James Garrett
- Jan Harrison as Alison Garrett
- J. Ian Douglas as Maj. Wharton
- Jerry Frank as Capt. Maywood
- Barbara Parry as Mrs. Maywood
- Peter Mamakos as Sgt. Maj. Kukas
- Johnny Western as cavalry Sergeant
- Maureen Hingert as Chanzana (billed as Jana Davi)
- Larry Chance as Victorio

== Production ==
Parts of the film were shot in Kanab Canyon, Johnson Canyon, and the Kanab movie fort in Utah.
