= Nuestra Belleza El Salvador 2011 =

- Date: June 30, 2011
- Presenters: Gerardo Parker & Rebeca Moreno
- Entertainment: Alvaro Aguilar
- Broadcaster: Canal 2
- Entrants: 16
- Placements: 5
- Winner: Alejandra Ochoa & Marcela Castro
- Congeniality: Mayra Aldana

Nuestra Belleza El Salvador 2011 took place on June 30, 2011 at the Teatro Nacional de El Salvador in San Salvador.

Nuestra Belleza Universo 2010, Sonia Cruz; and Nuestra Belleza Mundo 2010, Gabriela Molina crowned their respective successors at the end of the event. 16 women participated in the event, which commemorated El Salvador's bicentenary. For the first time, 17-year-olds were allowed to participate, and a national costume showcase was also added to the event. The co-winners represented El Salvador at Miss Universe 2011 and Miss World 2011.

== Results ==
Final results	Contestant
Nuestra Belleza Universo 2011	Alejandra Ochoa
Nuestra Belleza Mundo 2011	Marcela Castro
1st runner-up	Mayra Aldana
2nd runner-up	Sofia Cuestas
3rd runner-up	Aneyda Rico

== Candidates ==
Contestant	Age	Height
Gracia Maria Molina	19	1.62 m (5 ft 4 in)
Griselda Canas	19	1.61 m (5 ft 3 1/2 in)
Karla Garcia	22	1.62 m (5 ft 4 in)
Sofia Cuestas	21	1.64 m (5 ft 4 1/2 in)
Glenda Martinez	17	1.65 m (5 ft 5 in)
Gabriela Mena	17	1.65 m (5 ft 5 in)
Klaudia Navarro	22	1.65 m (5 ft 5 in)
Carolina Fuentes	17	1.67 m (5 ft 5 1/2 in)
Wendy Leiva	22	1.67 m (5 ft 5 1/2 in)
Andrea Mariona	19	1.67 m (5 ft 5 1/2 in)
Karen Fortis	19	1.67 m (5 ft 5 1/2 in)
Evelyn Lopez	21	1.67 m (5 ft 5 1/2 in)
Aneyda Rico	20	1.70 m (5 ft 7 in)
Mayra Aldana	24	1.70 m (5 ft 7 in)
Marcela Castro	17	1.72 m (5 ft 7 1/2 in)
Alejandra Ochoa	18	1.74 m (5 ft 8 1/2 in)

== Crossovers ==
Contestants who previously competed at other beauty pageants:

Miss Earth 2009

- Mayra Aldana
