= Gun Fever (film) =

1958 film by Mark Stevens

- Theatrical release poster
- Directed by: Mark Stevens
- Screenplay by: Stanley H. Silverman; Mark Stevens
- Story by: Harry S. Franklin; Julius Evans
- Produced by: Harry Jackson; Anthony Spinelli
- Starring: Mark Stevens; John Lupton; Larry Storch; Maureen Hingert; Aaron Saxon; Jered Barclay; Dean Fredericks
- Cinematography: Charles Van Enger
- Edited by: Lee Gilbert
- Music by: Paul Dunlap
- Production company: Jackson-Weston Productions
- Distributed by: United Artists
- Release date: January 1958
- Running time: 83 minutes
- Country: United States
- Language: English

Gun Fever is a 1958 American Western film directed by Mark Stevens and written by Stanley H. Silverman and Mark Stevens. The film stars: Mark Stevens, John Lupton, Larry Storch, Maureen Hingert, Aaron Saxon, Jered Barclay and Dean Fredericks. The film was released in January 1958, by United Artists.

== Plot ==
A son returns from a year mining to see his parents killed on his first night back, then takes to the trail to search for their killers.

== Cast ==
- Mark Stevens as Luke Ram
- John Lupton as Simon Weller
- Larry Storch as Amigo
- Maureen Hingert (as Jana Davi) as Tanana
- Aaron Saxon as Trench
- Jered Barclay as Singer
- Dean Fredericks as Charlie Whitman
- Clegg Hoyt as Kane
- Jean Inness as Martha Ram
- Russell Thorson as Thomas Ram
- Robert J. Stevenson as Norris
- Cyril Delevanti as Jerry
- Bill Erwin as Bartender
- Michael Hinn as Stableman
- John Goddard as Lee
- K.L. Smith as Jack
- Iron Eyes Cody as 1st Indian chief
- Eddie Little Sky as 2nd Indian chief
- George Selk as Farmer
- David Bond as Bit Role
