= Raymond Theatre (Pasadena, California) =

Former movie theater and music venue in Pasadena, California, United States

Coordinates: 34.1481°N 118.14935°W

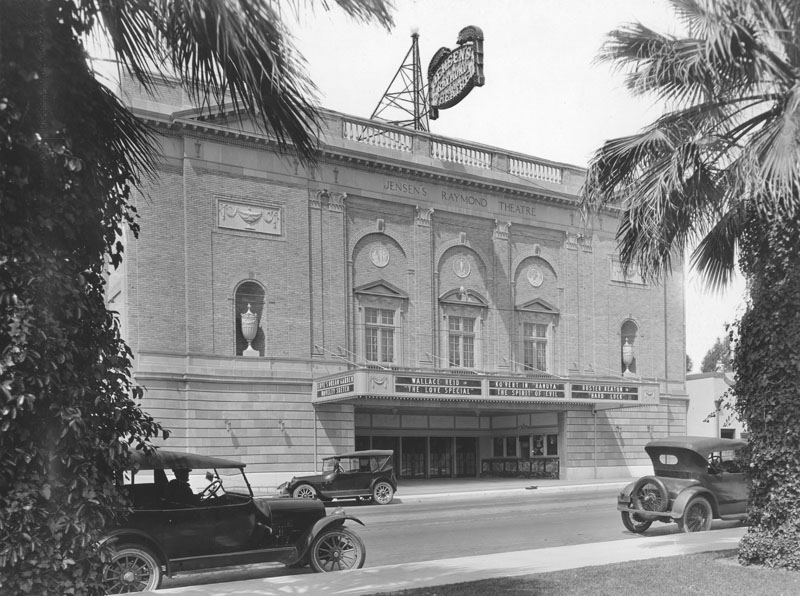
The theatre in 1922

Raymond Theatre (formerly Perkins Palace) is an auditorium located in Pasadena, California, built around 1921.

It was known as Perkins Palace when it was a live music venue from 1979 through 1991. In addition to being a popular music venue, it was featured in several films and music videos during the 1980s. Artists that recorded and released live shows at Perkins Palace include Phil Collins, RATT, Dave Mason, and New Grass Revival.

== History ==
A group known as Friends of the Raymond Theatre, including promoter Gina Zamparelli, has advocated keeping the Raymond Theatre as a performing arts venue. They were looking for a buyer in 2006.

In 2009, the theater's exterior was restored while the interior was converted to mixed use residential and retail. The theater's auditorium was also restored. A condominium building called The Raymond Renaissance was built next door.

The Theatre was owned by the father of rock star David Lee Roth in the 1970's.

== Litigation ==
Gary Folgner lost control of the building in November 1991, following missed payments and a dispute with a supplier of upholstery fabric.
