= Hillevi Rombin =

Swedish-American actress and beauty queen (1933–1996)

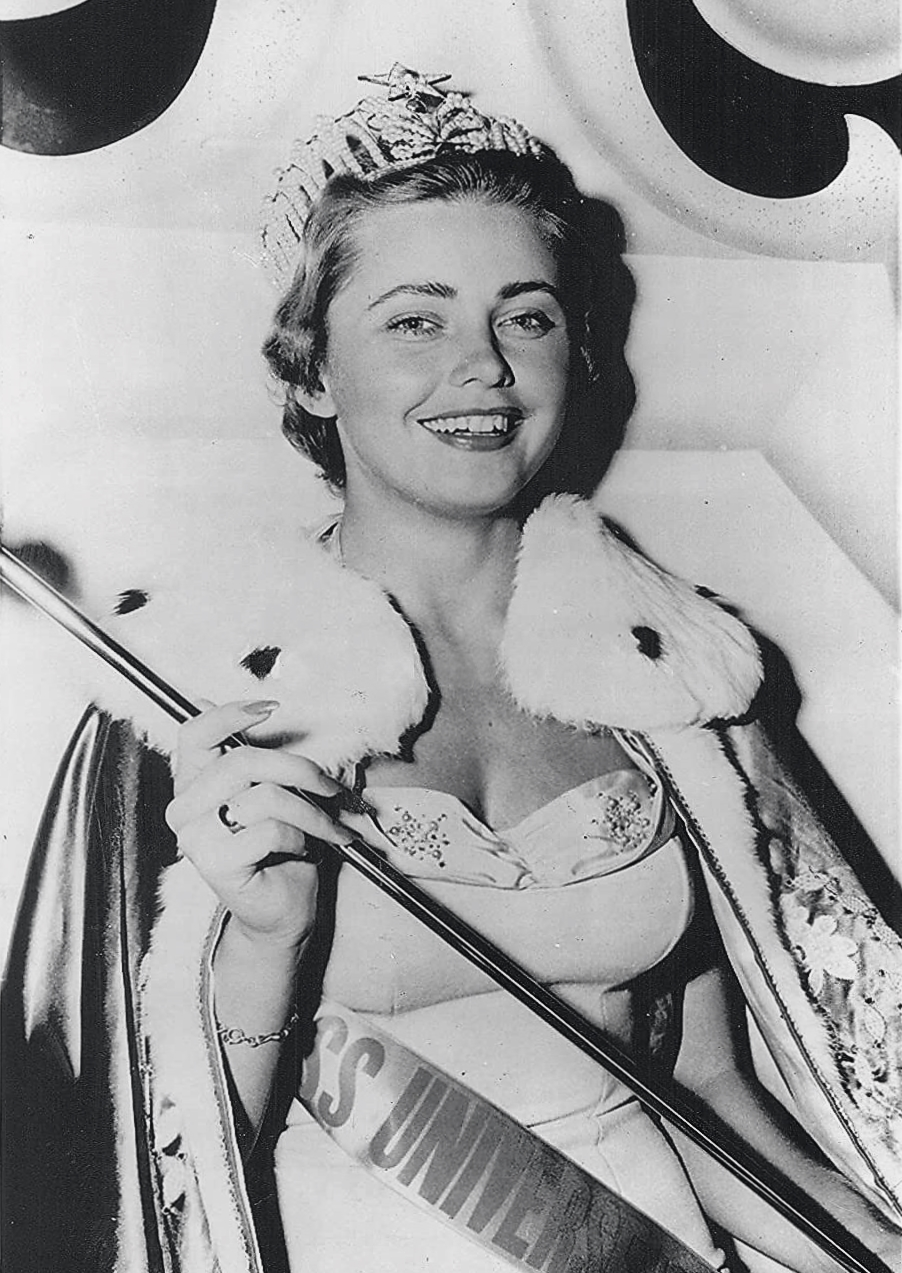
- Rombin as Miss Universe in 1955
- Born: Hillevi A.K. Rombin; September 14, 1933; Ovanåker, Sweden
- Died: June 19, 1996 (aged 62); Los Angeles, California, U.S.
- Spouse: G. David Schine (m. 1957)
- Beauty pageant titleholder
- Title: Miss Sweden 1955; Miss Universe 1955
- Major competitions: Miss Sweden 1955 (Winner); Miss Universe 1955 (Winner)

Hillevi Rombin Schine (September 14, 1933 – June 19, 1996) was a Swedish-American actress and beauty queen who was crowned as Miss Sweden and became the fourth winner of Miss Universe in 1955.

== Biography ==
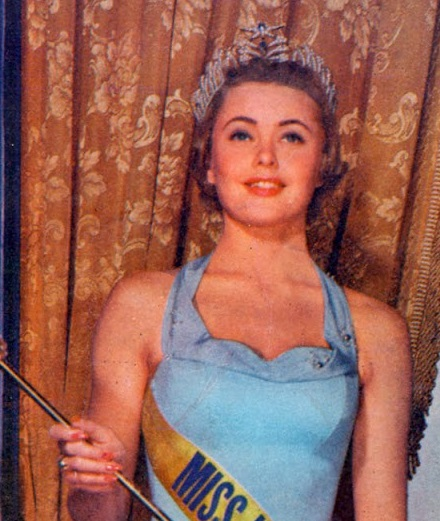
Hillevi Rombin in 1956

She grew up in Uppsala, Uppland, and was the Swedish national decathlon champion before she competed in the pageant. A remarkable athlete, Rombin excelled in gymnastics, track & field, and downhill skiing. After winning the pageant, she left Sweden for Hollywood to fulfill her acting contract with Universal Pictures, part of the prize package as Miss Universe. She studied acting along with John Gavin, Clint Eastwood, and Barbara Eden, among the other contract actors. Universal put her in a couple of films, with just one or two lines, to give her some exposure and experience. She was credited for small speaking roles in two films. In The Benny Goodman Story (1955) she asks for an autograph and in Istanbul (1957) she appears as a flight attendant near the film's end.

During her yearlong reign as Miss Universe, she traveled in the United States and met G. David Schine, a hotel-business heir who was a central figure in the Army–McCarthy hearings of 1954. Rombin married Schine in 1957 and discontinued her acting career to focus on married life. She and Schine had six children.

In 1996, the couple and one of their sons died in a private airplane accident, the result of an engine failure shortly after take-off. She was 62 years old and the first Miss Universe to die. The three are buried together at Westwood Village Memorial Park Cemetery in the Westwood area of Los Angeles.

== Filmography ==
Year	Title	Role	Notes
1957	The Adventures of Hiram Holliday		Episode: "Sturmzig Cuneiform"
1957	Istanbul	Air Hostess	(final film role)

== See also ==
- List of fatalities from aviation accidents

Awards and achievements
Preceded by (United States) Miriam Stevenson	Miss Universe; 1955	Succeeded by (United States) Carol Morris
