= Elena Tedesco =

Salvadoran beauty queen (born 1991)

- Born: Elena Isabella Tedesco Bardi; October 15, 1991 (age 34); San Salvador, El Salvador
- Height: 5 ft 5 in (1.65 m)
- Beauty pageant titleholder
- Title: Miss El Salvador World 2009
- Hair color: Brown
- Eye color: Green

Elena Isabella Tedesco Bardi (born October 15, 1991, in San Salvador, El Salvador) is a Salvadoran model and beauty pageant titleholder who won the Nuestra Belleza Mundo El Salvador pageant in 2009. She is daughter of an entrepreneur Salvadoran mother and Italian diplomatic father.

She is fluent in Spanish, English, French, Portuguese, and Italian.

== Nuestra Belleza El Salvador Mundo 2009 ==
Elena Tedeso was crowned Nuestra Belleza Mundo El Salvador 2009 on August 28, 2009, at Telecorporación Salvadoreña studios in San Salvador with the participation of 14 delegates. Elena at the time was 17 years with a height of 1.65 m.

== Miss World 2009 ==
Elena participated in the 59th Miss World pageant, was held on December 12, 2009, at the Gallagher Convention Centre in Johannesburg, South Africa.

Awards and achievements
Preceded by Gabriela Gavidia	Nuestra Belleza El Salvador; 2009	Succeeded by Gabriela Molina
