= Milena Mayorga =

Salvadoran ambassador

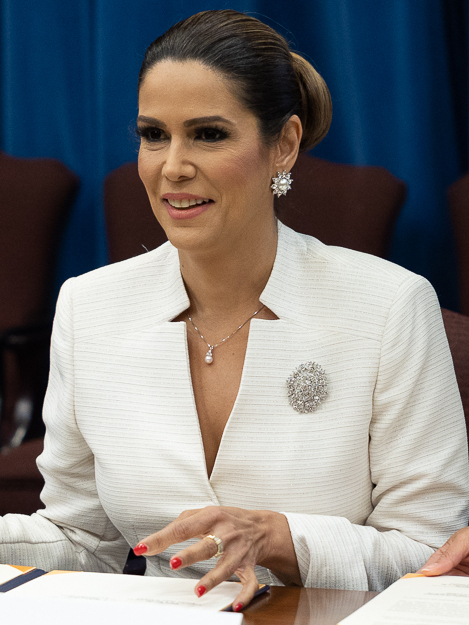
- Mayorga in 2022

El Salvador Ambassador to the United States
- Incumbent
- Assumed office 1 December 2020
- President: Nayib Bukele

Deputy of the Legislative Assembly of El Salvador from San Salvador
- In office 1 May 2018 – 1 December 2020

Personal details
- Born: Carmen Milena Mayorga Valera; 22 April 1976 (age 49) San Salvador, El Salvador
- Party: Independent (2020–present); Nationalist Republican Alliance (before 2020)
- Occupation: Politician, diplomat, journalist, model
- Website: milenamayorga.com

Carmen Milena Mayorga Valera (born 22 April 1976) is a Salvadoran diplomat, politician, journalist, and former model. Since 1 December 2020, she has served as Salvadoran Ambassador to the United States, having been appointed by President Nayib Bukele. She was previously a member of the Legislative Assembly of El Salvador from the San Salvador Department from 2018 to 2020. Forbes magazine in the USA presented her as the first Salvadoran to promote the Pro Bitcoin agenda abroad.

Mayorga is a retired model and beauty pageant contestant who represented El Salvador in Miss Universe 1996, where she finished in the top ten. Prior to entering politics, she was a journalist and news presenter. She was formerly a member of the Nationalist Republican Alliance (ARENA) until renouncing her membership in 2020.

== Early life and modeling career ==
Carmen Milena Mayorga Valera was born on 22 April 1976 in San Salvador to a doctor and a Venezuelan mother. After graduating high school, Mayorga became a model for Willie Maldonado in the longest-running TV show in El Salvador, Fin de Semana.

Mayorga won Miss El Salvador 1996, and competed at Miss Universe 1996, reaching the Top 10, being the 4th Salvadorian woman to be in the top at Miss Universe, and being the last Salvadoran to make the top for Miss Universe until Isabella García-Manzo managed to enter the Top 10 of Miss Universe 2023. Mayorga became the first Central American to have a Back To Back classification at Miss Universe.

After Miss Universe, Mayorga went on to be a news presenter for Teledos of the Telecorporación Salvadoreña from 1999 to 2005. In June 2005, she joined rival channel Canal 12 and became part of a new group of presenters on El Salvador's longest running morning show, Hola El Salvador. In 2011, Mayorga became conductor of her own talk show, Milena tu amiga on Canal 12.

== Political career ==
=== Legislative Assembly (2018–2020) ===
Mayorga was elected to the Legislative Assembly of El Salvador for the San Salvador Department in 2018 as a member of the Nationalist Republican Alliance (ARENA). However, on 4 June 2020, she renounced her party membership, accusing the party's leadership of corruption.

As a legislator, in relation to corruption, Mayorga supported the creation of the Permanent Commission against Corruption, the creation of the International Commission against Impunity in El Salvador, and a law for the repatriation of stolen or evaded capital.

In 2020, she voted in favor of all the proposals by the government of Nayib Bukele in terms of loans, fiscal measures, and health measures related to COVID-19.

=== Ambassador to the United States (2020–present) ===
She became the ambassador to the United States on 1 December 2020. In regard to foreign relations, she supported the creation of a special commission to monitor the situation of Salvadorans residing in the United States before the termination of Temporary Protected Status, a law for the exercise of the vote from abroad in the 2021 Salvadoran legislative election, reform of the migration and immigration legislation, and ratification of the Treaty on the Prohibition of Nuclear Weapons.
