= Miss Grand El Salvador =

El Salvadoran beauty pageant title

- Formation: 2013
- Type: Beauty pageant
- Headquarters: San Salvador
- Location: El Salvador
- Members: Miss Grand International
- Official language: Spanish
- National director: Francisco Cortez
- Parent organization: Nuestra Belleza El Salvador (2013 – 2014); CNB El Salvador (2018 – Present)

Miss Grand El Salvador is a national title given to a woman chosen to represent El Salvador at Miss Grand International. The title was first mentioned in 2013 when a San Salvador-based model, Elisa Durán, was appointed to represent the country at the inaugural edition of Miss Grand International in Thailand. Since 2018, the right to send an El Salvadoran representative to compete at Miss Grand International has belonged to a national pageant chaired by Francisco Cortez, Certamen Nacional de la Belleza El Salvador (CNB El Salvador), in which the main winner was titled Reina de El Salvador and customarily assumed to be Miss Grand El Salvador.

Since its first participation in 2013, El Salvadoran representatives obtained placement at the Miss Grand International pageant only once in 2020 when Luciana Martínez was placed among the top 20 finalists.

== History ==
El Salvador debuted at Miss Grand International in 2013 with an appointed representative, Elisa Durán. Later in 2014, one of the Nuestra Belleza El Salvador 2011 finalists, Andrea Mariona, was assumed to be Miss Grand El Salvador 2014 but did to compete internationally for undisclosed reasons.

After four years of absence, the country turned back to the competition in 2018, when the president of the Certamen Nacional de la Belleza El Salvador (CNB El Salvador) pageant, Francisco Cortez, purchased the license and appointed the 2016 pageant winner, Génesis Fuentes, to compete at the international stage in Myanmar. After that, the winner of his affiliated pageant automatically assumed the title of Miss Grand El Salvador and obtained the right to compete at Miss Grand International in that particular year.

In 2023, the Salvadoran representative to Miss Grand International was elected through the stand-alone pageant, which is considered, to date, the first and only edition of the Miss Grand El Salvador pageant; the representative for the 2024 international contest was expected to be chosen via the CNB El Salvador stage, as previously done from 2019-2022.

== Editions ==
=== Location and date ===
The Miss Grand El Salvador pageant was held as a stand-alone pageant only once in 2023.

Edition	Date	Final venue	Entrants	Ref.
1st	29 July 2023	FEPADE Theater, San Salvador	14	

=== Competition result ===
Edition	Winner	Runners-up		Ref.
Edition	Winner	First	Second	Ref.
1st	Fátima Calderón (La Libertad)	Alexia Pacheco (Santa Ana)	Naomy Montiel (San Miguel)	

== International competition ==
The following is a list of Salvadorian representatives at the Miss Grand International contest.

Color keys

- : Declared as the winner
- : Ended as a runner-up (Top 5)
- : Ended as a finalist (Top 10)
- : Ended as a semifinalist (Top 20/21)
- : Ended as special awards winner

Year	Department	Miss Grand El Salvador	National title	Placement	Special Awards	National Director
2026	La Libertad	Valeria Amaya	Reina de El Salvador 2026	Unplaced		Francisco Cortez
2025	La Libertad	Lucianne Herrera	Appointed	Unplaced		Francisco Cortez
2024	San Salvador	Giulia Zanoni	Appointed	Top 20		Francisco Cortez
2024	Santa Ana	Alexia Pacheco	Reina de El Salvador 2024	Resigned		Francisco Cortez
2023	San Salvador	Fátima Calderón	Miss Grand El Salvador 2023	Unplaced		Francisco Cortez
2022	San Salvador	Noor Mohamed	Reina de El Salvador 2022	Unplaced		Francisco Cortez
2021	Santa Ana	Iris Guerra	Reina de las Fiestas Patronales de Santa Ana 2016	Unplaced		Francisco Cortez
2020	San Salvador	Luciana Martínez	Reina de El Salvador 2020	Top 20		Francisco Cortez
2019	Usulután	Olga Ortiz	Reina de El Salvador 2019	Unplaced		Francisco Cortez
2018	San Salvador	Génesis Fuentes	Reina de El Salvador 2016	Unplaced		Francisco Cortez
Did not compete between 2015 - 2017
2014	San Salvador	Andrea Mariona	Finalists Nuestra Belleza El Salvador 2011	Did not compete		Raúl Domínguez
2013	San Salvador	Elisa Durán	Appointed	Unplaced		Raúl Domínguez

== National pageant candidates ==
=== Participating departments and territories representatives ===
Representatives	1st
Departments
Ahuachapán	Y
Cabañas	Y
Chalatenango	Y
Cuscatlán	Y
La Libertad	
La Paz	Y
La Unión	Y
Morazán	Y
San Miguel	
San Salvador	Y
San Vicente	Y
Santa Ana	
Sonsonate	Y
Usulután	Y
Total	14
Color keys: : Declared as the winner; : Ended as a 1st runner-up; : Ended as a 2nd runner-up; A : Ended as a finalist, semifinalist and unplaced; × : Ended as withdrew during the competition; × : Ended as no representative

== Winner Gallery ==
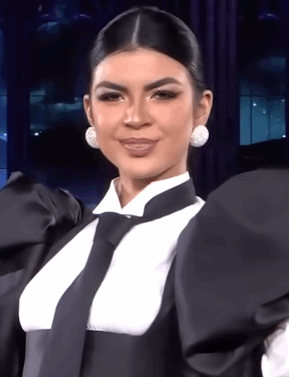
Lucianne Herrera
Miss Grand El Salvador 2025

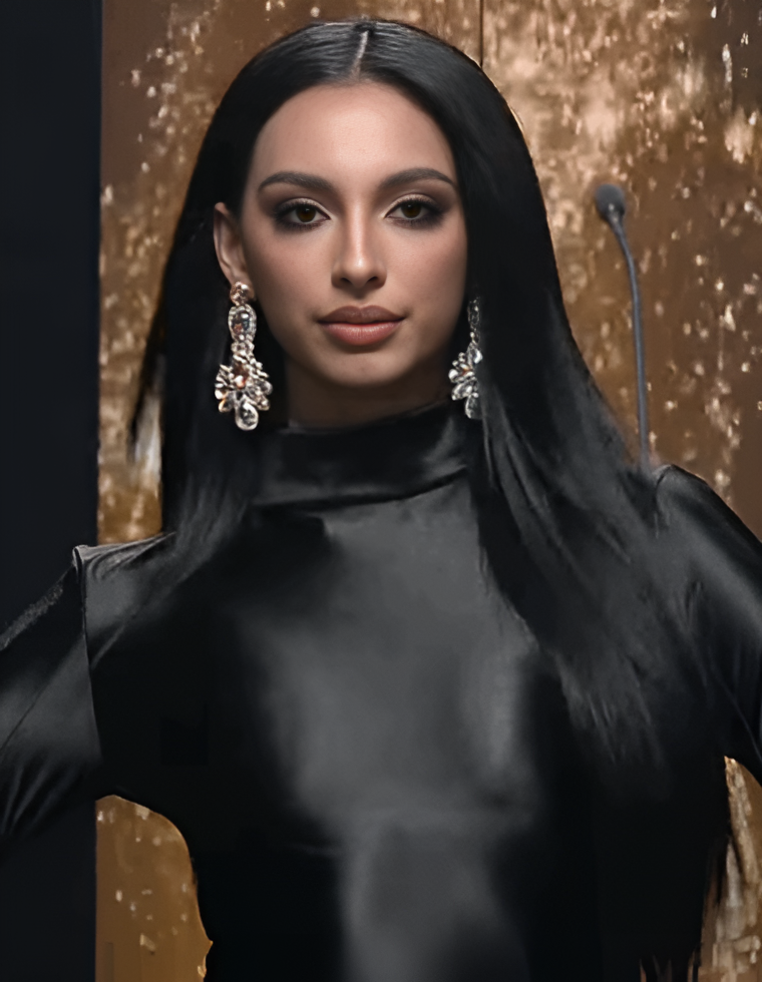
Giulia Zanoni
Miss Grand El Salvador 2024

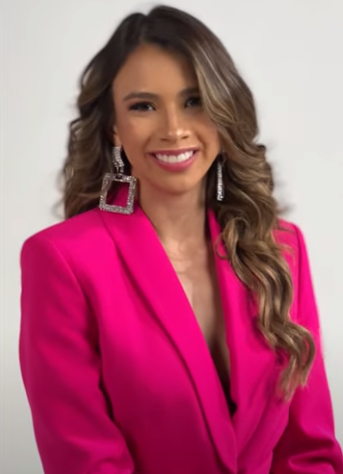
Fátima Calderón
Miss Grand El Salvador 2023
