= Isabella García-Manzo =

Salvadoran beauty pageant titleholder

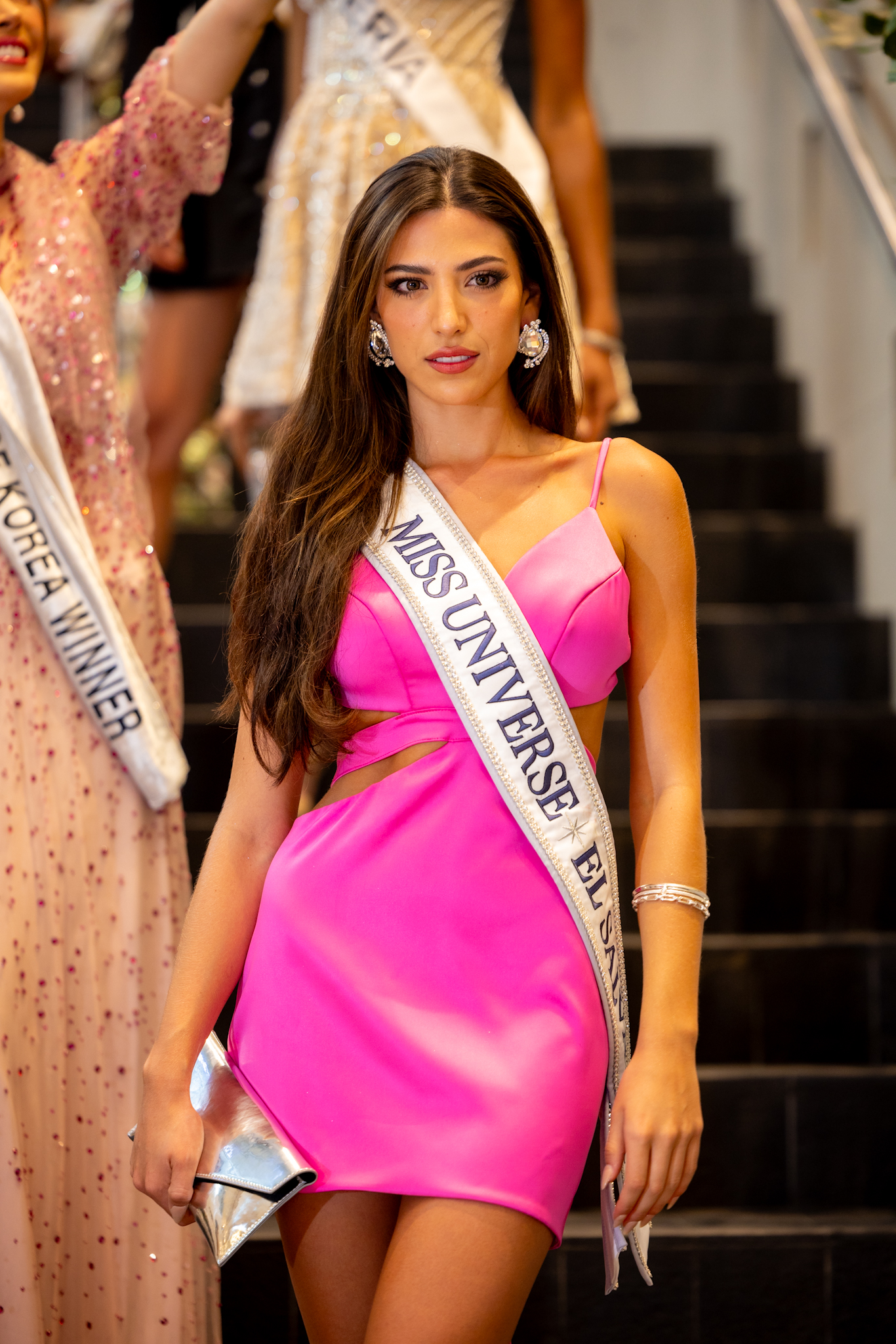
- García-Manzo in 2023
- Born: Isabella García-Manzo Gutiérrez; San Salvador, El Salvador
- Height: 1.78 m (5 ft 10 in)
- Parents: Andres García Manzo (father); Natalia Gutiérrez (mother)
- Beauty pageant titleholder
- Title: Miss El Salvador 2023
- Hair color: Brown
- Eye color: Brown
- Major competitions: Miss El Salvador 2023; (Winner); Miss Universe 2023; (Top 10)

Isabella García-Manzo Gutiérrez is a Salvadoran beauty pageant titleholder who was crowned Miss El Salvador 2023. She represented El Salvador at Miss Universe 2023 and made it into the top 10 finalists.

== Early life ==
Isabella García-Manzo Gutiérrez was born in San Salvador, El Salvador. Isabella García-Manzo is a daughter of Guatemalan businessman Andres García-Manzo and former beauty queen Natalia Gutiérrez who in 1994 represented the country of El Salvador in the Miss International beauty pageant.

== Pageantry ==
=== Miss Universe El Salvador 2023 ===
García-Manzo won Miss Universe El Salvador, while representing her hometown of San Salvador.

=== Miss Universe 2023 ===
García-Manzo represented El Salvador at Miss Universe 2023, at the Adolfo Pineda National Gymnasium, El Salvador on 18 November 2023. She reached the top 10 semifinalists, becoming the first representative from the nation to place since Miss Universe 1996 and the fifth overall.

Awards and achievements
Preceded by Alejandra Guajardo	Miss Universe El Salvador; 2023	Succeeded by Florence Garcia
Preceded by (Panama) Solaris Barba	3rd Placed Best National Costume Miss Universe; 2023	Succeeded by (Vietnam) Nguyễn Cao Kỳ Duyên
