= Gina Zamparelli =

- Born: 8 May 1959
- Origin: Los Angeles, California, United States
- Died: 21 May 2018 (aged 59)
- Occupation: Concert promoter

Gina N. Zamparelli (8 May 1959 – 21 May 2018) was an American, Los Angeles–based, concert promoter.

== Family ==
Zamparelli was the daughter of Sri-Lankan model and Miss Universe title-holder Maureen Hingert and American designer Mario Armond Zamparelli.

== Career ==
Zamparelli was the first woman concert promoter to produce concerts in major venues with national-level artists in the United States. She sold out every concert in over a decade of shows in Los Angeles, helping to break in many bands and secure them record deals. She had produced concerts at Perkins Palace, The Roxy Theatre, The Whisky a Go Go, The Hollywood Palladium, The Santa Monica Civic Auditorium and The Wadsworth Theatre.

Her company also managed Perkins Palace (also known as the Raymond Theatre) in Pasadena, California. She built Perkins Palace into one of Los Angeles' top venues for live music, which has left its mark on popular music history.

Additionally, Zamparelli was active in historic preservation. She formed a non-profit organization, Friends of the Raymond Theatre, whose mission was to save this historic landmark theater. She waged one of the longest (20-year) battles fought for a historic landmark in the city of Pasadena.

== Honors and achievements ==
Perkins Palace (aka The Raymond Theatre) was awarded a "top grossing venue" while under operation by Zamparelli.

For her work in historic preservation, she had been awarded Pasadena's Best Citizen of the Year, Pasadena's Best Historic Preservation Organization and Best Preservation organization in the State of California by the California Preservation Foundation. She sat on the Board of Directors for Hollywood Heritage.

== Death ==
Zamparelli died on 21 May 2018 after a short illness. She had been diagnosed with glioblastoma, an aggressive cancer of the brain.
