= Marcelo Tejeda =

Salvadoran footballer (born 1986)

Personal information
- Full name: Marcelo Javier Tejeda Brugnoli
- Date of birth: August 5, 1988 (age 38)
- Place of birth: Santa Ana, El Salvador
- Height: 1.76 m (5 ft 9 in)
- Position: Defender

Senior career*
Years	Team	Apps	(Gls)
2007–2008	Cerro		
2008–2009	Liverpool FC Montevideo		
2009–2010	Bella Vista		
2010–2011	Fénix		
2011–2012	→ Institución Atlética Potencia (loan)		
2012–2013	CD Luis Ángel Firpo		
2013–2016	CD Atlético Marte		
2016	CD FAS		
2016–2017	Deportivo Mictlán		
2018–2019	Sonsonate FC		
2019–2020	Once Deportivo		
- * Club domestic league appearances and goals

Marcelo Javier Tejeda Brugnoli (born August 5, 1986) is a Salvadoran former professional footballer who played as a defender. Tejeda is the son of the Uruguayan professional footballer Julio "Chacho" Tejeda.

== Career ==
Tejeda began his career playing for several clubs in Uruguay, including C.A. Cerro, Liverpool Montevideo, Bella Vista, Fenix, Institución Atlética Potencia.

He joined Luis Ángel Firpo for 2013 season, helping them win the title before signing a two-year deal with Atlético Marte.
