= Zuleika Soler =

Salvadoran model and beauty queen (born 1994)

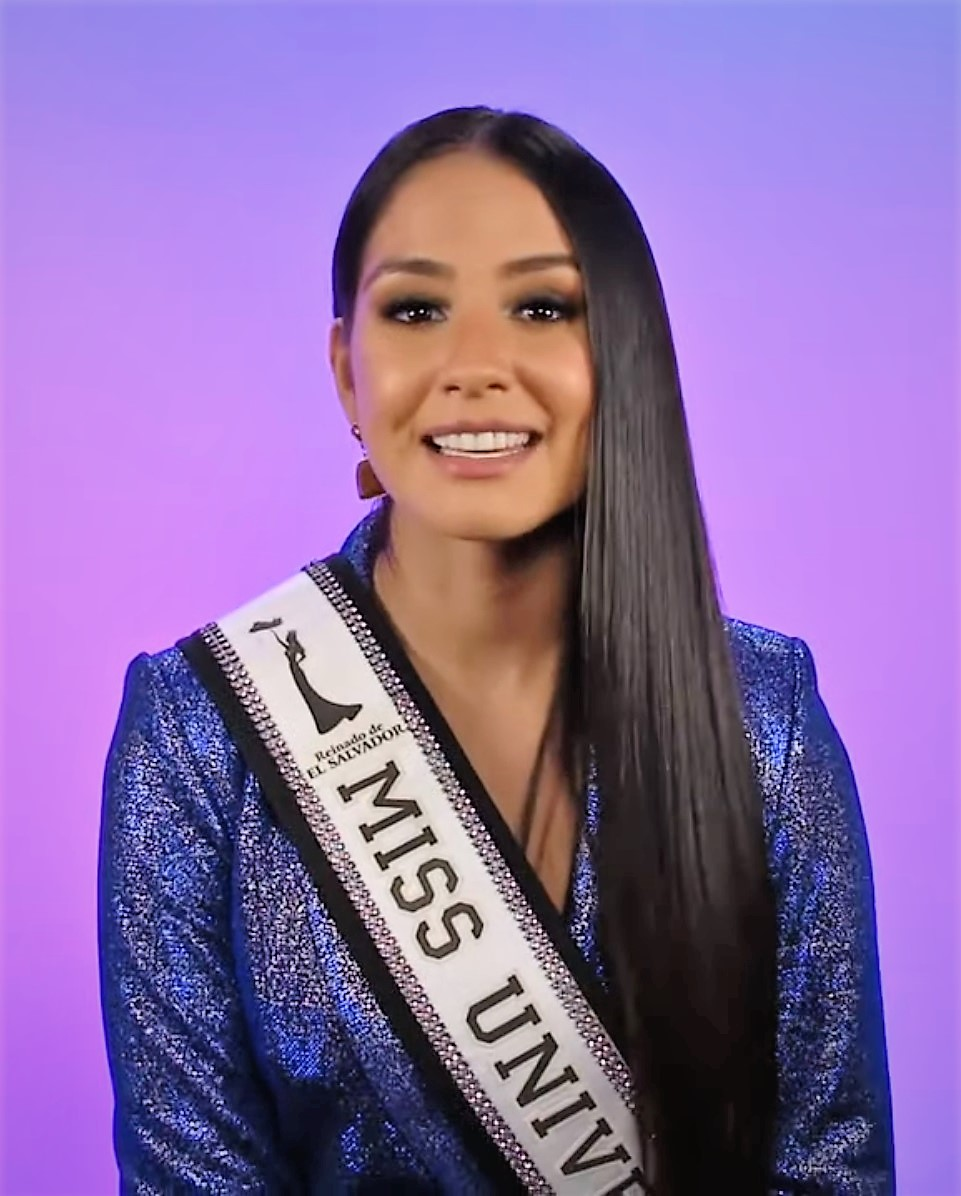
- Soler speaks with La Prensa Gráfica in 2019
- Born: Zuleika Soler Aragón; June 29, 1994 (age 32); La Unión, El Salvador
- Education: Kean University
- Height: 1.70 m (5 ft 7 in)
- Beauty pageant titleholder
- Title: Miss El Salvador Latina 2016; Reinado de El Salvador 2019
- Hair color: Black
- Eye color: Black
- Major competitions: Reinado de El Salvador 2019 (Winner); Miss Universe 2019 (Unplaced)

Zuleika Soler Aragón (born June 29, 1994) is a Salvadoran model and beauty pageant titleholder who was crowned Reinado de El Salvador 2019. She represented El Salvador at the Miss Universe 2019.

== Personal life ==
Soler was born on June 29, 1994, in La Unión, El Salvador to a Salvadoran mother and a Puerto Rican father and was raised in New Jersey. In 2018, she obtained her bachelor's degree in communications and public relations from Kean University.

== Pageantry ==
Soler first participated in Miss El Salvador Latina 2016, where she was crowned as Miss El Salvador Latina 2016 in San Salvador, gaining the right to represent her country at Miss América Latina del Mundo 2016 held at Gran Teatro Palenque in Riviera Maya, Mexico and placed as a Top 10 semi-finalist.

She continued her pageantry career as she represented La Unión at the Reinado de El Salvador 2019 pageant and was crowned the title of Miss Universe El Salvador 2019 during the coronation night held on July 20, 2019, Soler will now represent El Salvador at Miss Universe 2019 after her victory. She succeeded outgoing Miss Universe El Salvador 2018 Marisela de Montecristo.

Awards and achievements
Preceded by Marisela de Montecristo	Reinado de El Salvador; 2019	Succeeded by Vanessa Velásquez
