= Patricia Murillo =

Claudia Patricia Murillo
- Born: Claudia Patricia Murillo; February 6, 1993 (age 33); Juayúa, El Salvador
- Height: 1.76 m (5 ft 9 1/2 in)
- Beauty pageant titleholder
- Title: Nuestra Belleza El Salvador 2014
- Hair color: Black
- Eye color: Brown
- Major competitions: Nuestra Belleza El Salvador 2014 (Winner); Miss Universe 2014 (Unplaced)

Claudia Patricia Murillo (born 1993) is a Salvadoran model and beauty pageant titleholder. She was crowned Nuestra Belleza El Salvador 2014 and represented her country at the Miss Universe 2014 pageant. She was said to be the "Mesoamerican Queen" based on her Native American physical features, as well as her national costume where she portrayed the Siguanaba mythology. Patricia was born in the town of Juayúa, which means "River of purple orchids", in Native American Pipil language. Although Patricia did not place in Miss Universe, she was a fan favorite, gaining much media attention and is considered one of the most memorable Miss El Salvador and Central American beauty queen in recent history due to her beauty and performance.

== Physical appearance ==
Patricia has Native American features. She has a tall, slender, statuesque figure, high cheek bones, almond-shaped feline dark bown eyes, big smile, auburn copper skin, long raven-black hair.

Awards and achievements
Preceded by Alba Delgado	Nuestra Belleza El Salvador; 2014	Succeeded by Idubina Rivas

Awards and achievements
Preceded by Alba Delgado	Miss Universe El Salvador; 2014	Succeeded by Idubina Rivas
