= Carmen Elena Figueroa =

Salvadoran beauty pageant winner and politician

- Born: Carmen Elena Figueroa Rodríguez; San Salvador, El Salvador
- Height: 1.70 m (5 ft 7 in)
- Beauty pageant titleholder
- Title: Miss El Salvador 1975; Miss Universe 1975 semifinalist (Top 12)
- Hair color: Brown
- Eye color: Green

Carmen Elena Figueroa Rodríguez is a Salvadoran politician and beauty pageant titleholder who was crowned Miss El Salvador 1975 and represented El Salvador at Miss Universe 1975 where she placed Top 12.

== Miss Universe 1975 ==
Figueroa was El Salvador's representative to the Miss Universe Pageant in 1975 and placed in the top 12, the first time a Salvadoran was placed in the semifinals since Maribel Arrieta in 1955.

== Legislative Assembly ==
She was elected to the El Salvador National Assembly in 2006 where she is currently the Deputy for the party ARENA. Figueroa is married and has two sons. Her father, Carlos Humberto Figueroa, was a colonel in the Salvadoran military. Through him, she is of Spanish descent.
