= Mario Armond Zamparelli =

American artist (1921–2012)

Mario Armond Zamparelli (June 4, 1921 – September 8, 2012) was an American artist and designer, best known for his connection with Howard Hughes.

== Life ==
Zamparelli was perhaps best known for his connection with Howard Hughes. For 18 years, Zamparelli was Chief Executive Designer of Hughes' empire, and created the corporate identity of TWA, Hughes Airwest, Hughes Helicopters, the Summa Corporation, Howard Hughes Medical Institute and was the artist for Hughes' RKO General movies posters.

He designed interiors and exteriors of many of the legendary Las Vegas hotels, including the Frontier Hotel, the Desert Inn, the Sands, Tropicana, among other Hughes' hotels and casinos and property holdings. He was also responsible for the only portrait of Howard Hughes in existence that was commissioned by Hughes himself.

Zamparelli was also responsible for many of the iconic corporate design identities of many products such as TWA, Datsun, Capitol Records, Hunts, Union Bank, Universal Pictures, Southern California Gas Company, Kimberly Clark, Mattel, the Norton Simon Corporation, among many others. He also designed the Home of the Future for Disney.

At a young age it was realized Zamparelli had the mind of a genius and an extraordinary talent in art, he started his career working in illustration for such magazines as Cosmopolitan, Vogue, Esquire, and Harpers Bazaar until he was handpicked by Howard Hughes as personal artist for his empire.

He was a fine artist, writer, avid photographer and musician, having played in a band with the legendary jazz artist Dave Brubeck in his younger years. He was also poet and an avid art collector and art teacher and was truly respected artist among his peers in the art world.

He is the Who's Who in the American West and Who's Who in American Art. He has won numerous awards, including a Golden Globe Award for "Best Documentary" for a BBC Four Hour "Hollywood Golden Years" documentary featuring Zamparelli's life.

== Family ==
Zamparelli married Sri Lankan beauty queen and actress Maureen Hingert in 1958. They divorced in 1970. They had three daughters — Gina Zamparelli, a well-known concert promoter in Los Angeles (who died in 2018); Marisa Zamparelli; and their youngest daughter, Andrea Laura Zamparelli (who died in 2009).
