= Miriam Zamparelli =

Puerto Rican sculptor

- Born: 1941 (age 84–85); Guayama, Puerto Rico
- Occupation: Sculptor
- Spouse: Reinaldo Zamparelli

Miriam Medina de Zamparelli (born 1941) is a sculptor of the generation of 1980, renowned for her wood projects. She was an active member of the Association of Women Artists of Puerto Rico.

== Biography ==
Born in Guayama, Puerto Rico, Miriam Medina lived and made her first studies in the Dominican Republic. She then moved to Chicago, where she continued her higher education. She married Reinaldo Zamparelli in 1954, living in Lima, Peru, and later in Bogotá, Colombia. She studied art in both cities.

In 1961, she settled in Puerto Rico. In 1978, she studied at the San Juan Art League with Professor Rolando López Dirube, and from 1979 to 1980 she studied at the School of Plastic Arts in San Juan. From 1983 to 1988, Zamparelli was co-founder and an active member of the Puerto Rico Association of Sculptors. From 1978 to 1988, she was on the board of directors of the Puerto Rico League of Art Students, an institution she presided over from 1985 to 1987.

== Work ==
Zamparelli is best known for sculpting in wood, although she has also worked in marble, iron, and stainless steel. In her projects, she has experimented with the properties of native woods such as ausubo, guayacán, and mahogany. Her style includes elements of neoconstructivism and expressionism.

Among her most recognized works are:

- Grupo Rosita (acrylic on canvas, 36 × 48, 1979)
- Observador II (guayacán, 24 × 12 × 12, 1980)
- Sin título (ceramic on stainless steel, 36 × 48, 1980)
- Sin título (mahogany, stainless steel base, 24 × 12 × 61, 1980)
- Observador (guayacán, 36 × 18 × 18, 1982)
- Homenaje a Derivado (mahogany with black stain, stainless steel base, 132.5 × 150 cm, 1983)
- Parte III (guayacán and stainless steel, 30 × 20, 1984)
- Espectador #1 (guayacán, 48 × 24 × 18, 1985)
- Libertad total (sculpture, assembly, 38", 1989)
- Maqueta Abacus (balsa wood, 12 × 4 × 4, 2001)
- Abacus I (guayacán, cedar, and mahogany, 72 × 36 × 36, 2001)
- Abacus II, (guayacán, mahogany, and steel, 72 × 48 × 36, 2002)

== Select expositions ==
1975

- City Hall of San Juan, Puerto Rico

1978

- Fourth Painting and Sculpture Show, Ateneo Puertorriqueño, San Juan, Puerto Rico

1979

- "Esculturas", City Hall of San Juan

1980

- Annual Art Exhibition, Mercantil Plaza, San Juan

1983

- First National Historical Exhibition of Puerto Rican Sculptors, San Juan Art and History Museum, San Juan
- Exhibition 20 × 15, San Juan League of Art Students, San Juan
- Women Artists, Ateneo Puertorriqueño, San Juan
- "Tres mujeres artistas", Galería André, Hato Rey, Puerto Rico
- "Women Artists from Puerto Rico", Cayman Gallery, New York
- Puerto Rico Association of Sculptors, San Juan

1984

- Association of Sculptors Second Exhibition, San Juan
- Lehigh University, Pennsylvania
- Association of Women Artists, Cayman Gallery, New York
- "Somoza, Ruiz y Zamparelli", Medical Sciences Campus, University of Puerto Rico, Río Piedras

1985

- Individual exhibition, Galería 59, San Juan
- Municipal Gallery of San Juan
- Certamen Ateneo Puertorriqueño, San Juan

1986

- "Catorce en Casa Blanca", Casablanca Museum, San Juan
- "Mujeres artistas de Puerto Rico", Museum of Fine Art, Institute of Puerto Rican Culture, San Juan

1988

- "Rebasando el Tiempo", Galería Caribe, San Juan
- "Growing Beyond: Women Artists from Puerto Rico", Museum of Modern Art of Latin American Organization of American States, Washington, D.C.
- Colectiva CitiBank Center, CityBank Center, San Juan

1990

- "Mujeres Artistas: protagonistas de los ochenta", Museo de las Casas Reales, Santo Domingo, Dominican Republic / Puerto Rico Museum of Contemporary Art, San Juan

2001

- Colectiva Galería Botello, Hato Rey
- Second Biennale of Sculpture in the Steel Industry, All Steel Manufacturing, Vega Baja, Puerto Rico

2003

- National Show of Plastic Arts, Institute of Puerto Rican Culture, Old Arsenal of the Spanish Navy, La Puntilla, San Juan
- Landscape, Galería Botello, San Juan
- Exhibition "El Arte en Puerto Rico a través del Tiempo", Puerto Rico Museum of Art, San Juan

2006

- "Esculturas", Galería Tamara, Puerto Nuevo, Puerto Rico

== Collections ==
- El Nuevo Día, San Juan
- Ateneo Puertorriqueño, San Juan

== Associations ==
- Association of Women Artists of Puerto Rico
- Association of Sculptors of Puerto Rico
- ARTistasXlaUPR

== Awards and distinctions ==
- Selected to represent Puerto Rico at the Exposición del Pabellón de Sevilla, Seville, Spain (1992)
- First Prize for Sculpture, Ateneo Puertorriqueño, San Juan (1985)

== See also ==
- List of Puerto Ricans
