= Maribel Arrieta =

Salvadoran television host (1934–1989)

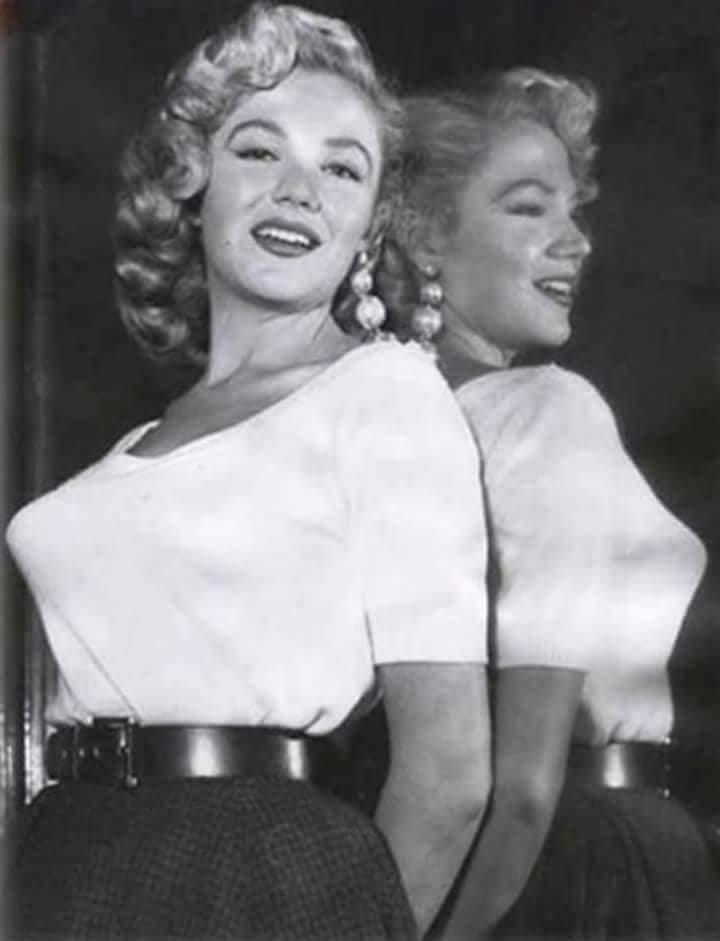
- Miss El Salvador Maribel Arrieta Gálvez, 1955
- Born: María Isabel Arrieta Gálvez; August 22, 1934; San Salvador, El Salvador
- Died: August 31, 1989 (aged 55); Brussels, Belgium
- Beauty pageant titleholder
- Title: Miss El Salvador 1955; Miss Congeniality 1955
- Hair color: Blonde
- Eye color: Green
- Major competitions: Miss El Salvador 1955 (Winner); Miss Universe 1955 (1st Runner-Up)

María Isabel Arrieta Gálvez or Maribel Arrieta (August 22, 1934 – August 31, 1989) was a Salvadoran television host, model and beauty pageant titleholder who was crowned Miss El Salvador 1955 and represented her country at Miss Universe 1955 in Long Beach, California. Arrieta is most known for her strong resemblance to Marilyn Monroe, leading people to dub her as "the Marilyn Monroe of El Salvador". Arrieta ultimately finished as first runner-up, losing to Hillevi Rombin, but not before taking home the title of "Miss Congeniality". She is the first Hispanic woman to become first-runner up in the Miss Universe pageant.

== Early life ==
Born in San Salvador, El Salvador to a high-class family of Spanish descent, Arrieta went to school at "La Asunción de Santa Ana" in Santa Ana, El Salvador; a Catholic, private school for the elite. She then went to Los Angeles, California, at the age of 16 before returning to El Salvador.

Arrieta is the second cousin of Roberto D'Aubuisson, founder of the right-wing party ARENA.

== Miss Universe 1955 ==
In the Miss Universe 1955 pageant, Arrieta became the first, and so far, the only, Salvadoran contestant to reach the top 5; finishing as first-runner up. After Miss Universe, Arrieta starred in a Mexican film called "Nos veremos en el cielo" ("We'll meet in heaven"), marking the first, and the last time she appeared in a movie.

== Later life ==
Arrieta returned to El Salvador in 1956, where the President at the time, Óscar Osorio made her the Consul-General to Belgium.

While at Belgium, Arrieta met Baron Jacques Thuret (of Belgian/French nobility) and they were married in 1961, granting her the title "Baronesa de Thuret". The couple had 3 children; two boys (Henry Francois and Tanguy) and one girl (Ariane). Arrieta then began focusing on her artwork, which was showcased in various cities in Europe.

Arrieta was one of the judges in Miss Universe 1975, when the organization was invited by the Salvadoran Government.

In her last visit to her home country in 1985, Arrieta was awarded the "Orden Pro Merito Melitensi" from the Order of Malta in El Salvador for her contributions to the country. Arrieta died on August 31, 1989, from cancer.
