= Irma Dimas =

Salvadoran beauty queen and politician (born 1986)

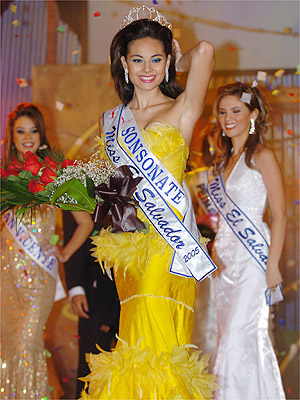
- Dimas crowned as Miss El Salvador 2005
- Born: Irma Marina Dimas Pineda; 9 August 1986 (age 40); San Salvador, El Salvador
- Height: 1.70 m (5 ft 7 in)
- Beauty pageant titleholder
- Title: Miss El Salvador 2005; Miss Piel Dorada 2005
- Hair color: Brunette
- Eye color: Brown
- Major competitions: Miss El Salvador 2005 (Winner); Miss Universe 2005 (Unplaced); Miss Earth 2005 (Top 16)

Irma Marina Dimas Pineda (9 August 1986 in San Salvador, El Salvador) is a Salvadoran politician, former model and beauty pageant titleholder who was crowned Miss El Salvador 2005 on 27 February 2005. She made headlines recently for her foray into the politics of El Salvador.

== Early life ==
Dimas was born in San Salvador, El Salvador. Before becoming a media personality she led a normal family life and was devoted to her studies. Her first appearance in media came about when she attended auditions for a Channel 12 TV reality show, Rumbo a la Corona and won a chance to compete for the title of Miss El Salvador in the 2005 competition. She won the contest and represented El Salvador in the Miss Universe 2005 pageant in Bangkok, Thailand, and the Miss Earth pageant in Quezon City, Philippines.

Dimas studied law at the Jose Simeon Canas Central American University (UCA), but prior to the Miss Universe competition left school temporarily to begin a four-month intensive training regimen.

== Beauty contests ==
In 2004, Channel 12 TV launched a call for young women to enter a reality show (produced by the same channel) in which the representative for El Salvador in the Miss Universe pageant would be chosen in a national contest. The concept of the reality show was to conduct trials before the contest to see who would be eliminated in the course of fourteen episodes, and to select fourteen of them to represent one of each of the fourteen departments of the country. The contest lasted five months and involved twenty-eight contestants.

Dimas's participation came about by coincidence when she accompanied a childhood friend who was signing up. She was seen by the president of the Miss El Salvador organization, who persuaded her to enter as well. During the final event held on 27 February 2005 before thousands of spectators, she beat the other thirteen contestants and took the crown, thereby earning the right to represent El Salvador in the Miss Universe 2005 pageant. Dimas also won other additional prizes from sponsors like Avon in categories such as best mouth, best legs, best face, and Miss Internet.

On 31 May 2005, Dimas participated in the Miss Universe contest after months of preparation, but during the final night of the event did not qualify for the fifteen semi-finalists. On 23 October 2005, Dimas took part in the Miss Earth pageant held in Quezon City, Philippines, where she placed in the top sixteen finalists. This was the first time a contestant from El Salvador reached the finals. In December of the same year Dimas participated in the Miss Piel Dorada pageant held in Costa Rica. Dimas won a car and a contract to pose for the Calendario Piel Dorada (Calendar of Golden Skin) in the 2006 edition. Dimas is the thirty-fourth woman to win the title of Miss El Salvador.

== Subsequent ==
After her stint in beauty pageants, Dimas has worked as a model. She was the official "face" of the former cable company AMNET from 2007 to 2009 and has appeared on national magazine covers. She has participated in several national fashion shows, wearing clothes by local designers. She went into politics on the Christian Democratic Party of El Salvador ticket, and sits on the party's political commission.
