= Francesca Miranda =

Salvadoran fashion designer (born 1957)

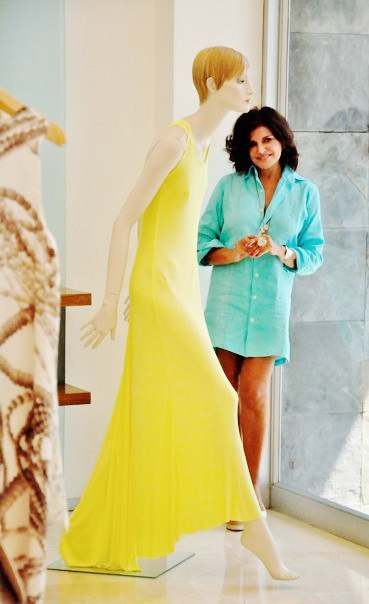
- Miranda in 2012
- Born: Francesca Miranda; Barranquilla, Colombia
- Label: Francesca Miranda

Francesca Miranda is a Colombian fashion designer. She sells her designs in all over the world. She has dressed several celebrities such as Rebecca Mader, Sofia Milos, Andrea Minski, Elisabeth Röhm, Perrey Reeves, Shenae Grimes, Ashlan Gorse, Nadia Dawn, Shaun Toub's wife Lorena Toub, Teyonah Parris and Broderick Johnson's wife Jennifer. In 2015, Adele chose to feature one of her wedding dress designs in an article in Glamour magazine.

== Early life and education ==
Miranda is one of five children of Gloria Gonzales de Miranda, an Ohioan entrepreneur of Spanish parents, and the Spanish-Italian lawyer and politician Ruy Cesar Miranda Lupone of an affluent family in the Central American country.

Miranda studied fashion merchandising at University of South Florida and Lake Land College, both in Florida.

== Brand and career ==
Miranda began to design under the Xango brand in 1995. Three years later she put her own name to her leading edge menswear designs. Having established herself as a menswear designer, in 2000 Miranda created City People, a range of clothes for women. City People has embroidery, fitted trousers and transparent blouses. Her 2001 collection was inspired by the works of the Colombian novelist Gabriel García Márquez.

In 1994, Miranda launched a menswear casual line for department stores in Colombia. She has been invited to participate in Colombiamoda, Colombia’s fashion industry trade show. In 1997 she inaugurated her first boutique with her label, "Francesca Miranda" with a menswear line. In 2000 she expanded to women's wear when opening her flagship store in Barranquilla, Colombia where she sells both men and women’s Pret A Porter, and Evening wear lines.

In 2001, she received from Fashion TV Paris, an award for best runway during Miami Fashion Week, and opened her second store in Colombia’s capital, Bogota. Four years later, she opened her first Central American store, in her native San Salvador.

Her collections are represented in the United States and Canada by Group 868 Inc showroom in New York. In 2010, alongside Group 868 Inc showroom, she launched her first bridal collection. Miranda had done bridal before, but only custom made gowns.

In November 2010, Miranda opened her third store in Colombia in the city of Cartagena. Her stores carry men's and women's collections, leather handbags for women, decorative pieces for the home and Colombian art pieces.

== Personal life ==
After her marriage to Francisco Jassir in 1983 she moved to her husband's hometown of Barranquilla, Colombia, where she opened her first boutique. Its success led to the opening of a new one in Cartagena. Her first boutique outside Colombia was opened in El Salvador. The couple have three children: Daniella Jassir Miranda, Francisco Jassir Miranda and Andrea Sofía Jassir Miranda. Daniella is a singer and fashion marketer, working as a marketing director of her mother's brand and her own.
