= Crashdïet discography =

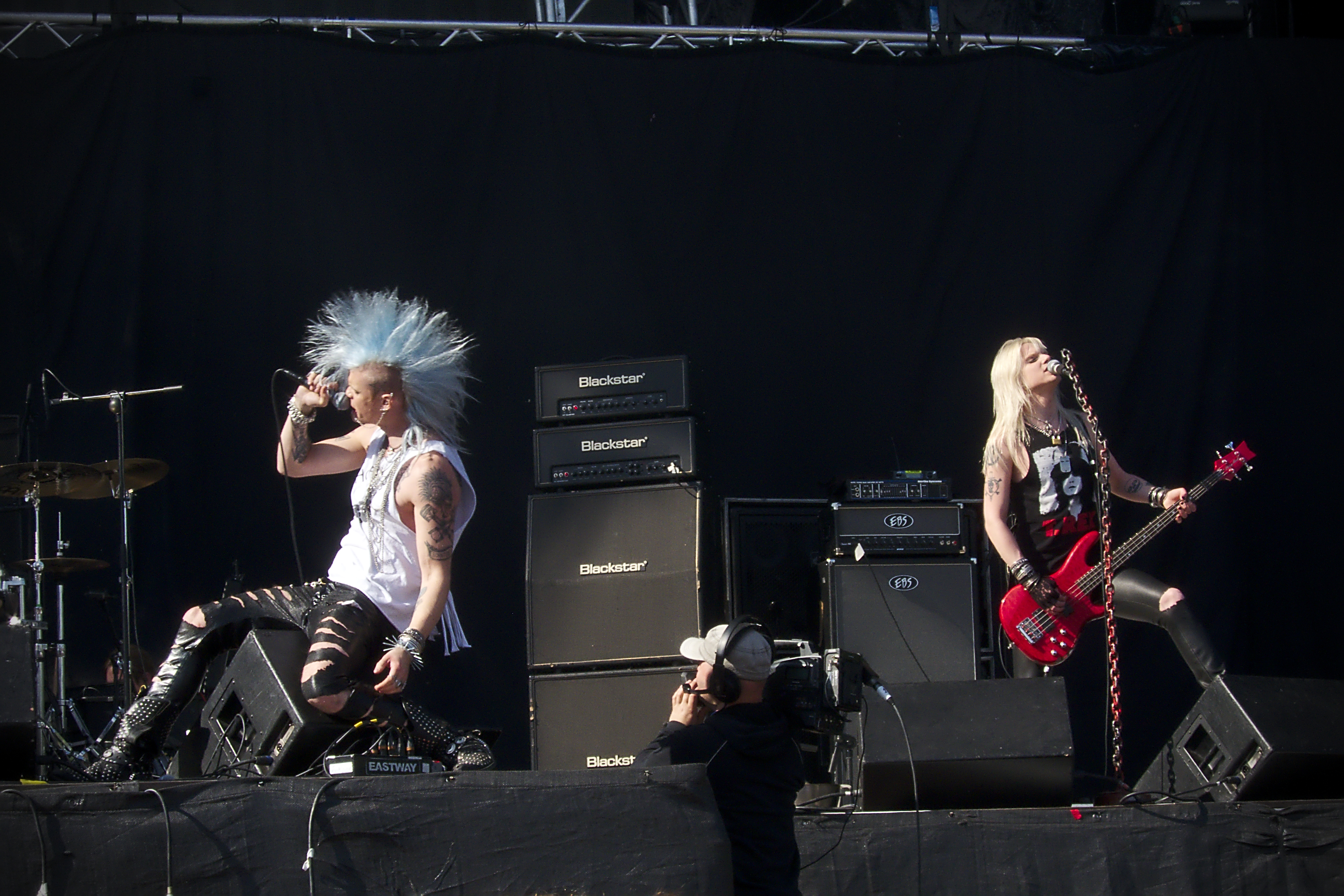
- Studio albums: 6
- Extended plays: 1
- Singles: 10
- Video albums: 3
- Music videos: 11

The discography of Crashdïet, a Swedish rock band, consists of five studio albums, eight singles, one EP, and two DVD. This list does not include solo material or sideprojects performed by the members. The band has released six albums, 2005's Rest in Sleaze, 2007's The Unattractive Revolution, 2010's Generation Wild, 2013's The Savage Playground, 2019's Rust, and 2022's Automaton.

== Studio albums ==
Year	Title	Peak chart positions	Certifications (sales thresholds)
Year	Title	SWE	Certifications (sales thresholds)
2005	Rest in Sleaze: Release: 20 May 2005; Label: Universal Music; Formats: CD	12	
2007	The Unattractive Revolution: Release: 3 October 2007; Label: Universal Music; Format: CD	11	
2010	Generation Wild: Release: 14 April 2010; Label: Gain Records; Format: CD	3	
2013	The Savage Playground: Release: 21 January 2013; Label: Gain Records; Format: CD	2	
2019	Rust: Release: 13 September 2019; Label: Dïet Records/Frontiers Music SRL; Format: CD	-	
2022	Automaton: Release: 29 April 2022; Label: Crusader Records; Format: CD	-	
2026	Art of Chaos: Release: 08 May 2026; Label: Ninetone Records; Format: CD	-	

== Extended plays ==
Year	Title
2003	Crashdïet: Release: 2003; Label: Unknown; Formats: CD

== Singles ==
Year	Title	Sweden singles	Album
2004	"Riot in Everyone" (7-inch)	—	—
2005	"Riot in Everyone"	33	Rest in Sleaze
2005	"Knokk 'Em Down"	57	Rest in Sleaze
2005	"Breakin' the Chainz"	47	Rest in Sleaze
2005	"It's a Miracle"	—	Rest in Sleaze
2007	"In the Raw"	35	The Unattractive Revolution
2008	"Falling Rain"	—	The Unattractive Revolution
2010	"Generation Wild"		Generation Wild
2010	"Chemical"		Generation Wild
2012	"Cocaine Cowboys"		The Savage Playground
2013	"California"		The Savage Playground
2018	"We Are Legion"		Rust
2019	"Reptile"		Rust
2019	"In the Maze"		Rust
2022	"No Man's Land"		Automaton
2022	"Together Whatever"		Automaton
2022	"Shine on"		Automaton
2023	"Sick Mind"	—	—
2023	"Better Be Cool"	—	—
2026	"Satizfaction"		Art of Chaos
2026	"Sick Enough for Me"		Art of Chaos
2026	"Loveblind"		Art of Chaos

== DVDs ==
Year	Title	Description
2007	Rest in Sleaze Tour 2005: Release: 12 March 2007; Label: Rabid Redneck Records; Format: DVD	Concert from the 2005 "Rest in Sleaze Tour", shot on 9 December 2005 in Stockholm. Only 1,000 copies were pressed.
2009	The Unattractive Revolution Tour (2007–2008): Release: 2009; Label: Format: DVD	Concert from the "Unattractive Revolution Tour", shot live at Klubben in Stockholm in 2007.
2012	Shattered Glass & Broken Bones: Three Years of Generation Wild: Release: 2012; Label: Format: DVD	Concert footage from the Generation Wild Era (mostly from 2011 Sweden Rock Festival), as well as other footage from international tours.

== Music videos ==
Year	Title
2005	"Riot in Everyone"
2005	"Knokk 'Em Down"
2005	"Breakin' the Chainz"
2005	"It's a Miracle"
2007	"In the Raw"
2008	"Falling Rain"
2010	"Generation Wild"
2011	"Down with the Dust" (unofficial)
2011	"Hollywood Tease"
2012	"Cocaine Cowboys"
2013	"California"
2013	"Circus"
