= The Unattractive Revolution Tour (2007–2008) =

- Starring: Crashdïet
- Music by: Crashdïet
- Release date: 2008
- Running time: 67 minutes
- Languages: English, Swedish

The Unattractive Revolution Tour (2007–2008) is a DVD released by the Swedish hard rock band Crashdïet. The main feature is a concert filmed at Klubben in Stockholm 2007.

A disc with bonus material is also included.

== Track listing – Disc 1 ==
1. INTRO
2. IN THE RAW
3. QUEEN OBSCENE
4. LIKE A SIN
5. NEEDLE IN YOUR EYE
6. I DONT CARE
7. FALLING RAIN
8. RIOT IN EVERYONE
9. THRILL ME
10. KNOKK EM DOWN
11. IT´S A MIRACLE
12. TIKKET
13. XTC OVERDRIVE
14. BREAKIN THE CHAINZ

== Bonus Material – Disc 2 ==
1. INTRO
2. IN THE RAW – PHOTOSHOOT
3. PARK CHAT
4. PETER & OLLI
5. LIVE AT SWEDEN ROCK FESTIVAL
6. SRF SIGNING SESSION
7. IN THE RAW – VIDEO SHOOT
8. ALBUM PHOTOSHOOT
9. LIVE IN GERMANY
10. LIVE IN HELSINGBORG – SWEDEN
11. LIVE AT PEACE & LOVE FESTIVAL
12. HOTEL MADNESS
13. LIVE AT STICKY FINGERS – SWEDEN
14. LIVE IN FINLAND
15. MORE GERMANY
16. OLLI & HARDCORE SUPERSTAR LIVE
17. ERIC & HARDCORE SUPERSTAR LIVE
18. BACKSTAGE MADNESS
19. TOUR BUS MADNESS
20. TOUR MANAGER
21. SOUND GUY
22. LIVE – BRAZIL – SÃO PAULO
23. WARM-UP
24. LIVE AT TYROL SWEDEN
25. LIVE IN LISEBERGHALLEN – SWEDEN

== Personnel ==
- H. Olliver Twisted – lead vocals
- Martin Sweet – guitars, backing vocals
- Peter London – bass guitar, backing vocals
- Eric Young – drums, backing vocals
