= The Savage Playground =

Studio album by Crashdïet
- Released: 22 January 2013
- Recorded: 2012
- Genre: Glam metal, hard rock
- Length: 58:30
- Label: Gain, Frontiers
- Producer: Otto Welton

Crashdïet chronology
Generation Wild (2010)	The Savage Playground (2013)	Rust (2019)

Singles from The Savage Playground
- 1. "Cocaine Cowboys" Released: 14 December 2012; 2. "California" Released: 6 February 2013

Professional ratings
Review scores
Source	Rating
Classic Rock	6/10
Kaoszine	7/10

The Savage Playground is the fourth studio album by Swedish rock band Crashdïet. The same name as the Canadian Hard Rock band "Savage Playground". The album was released on 22 January 2013. It is the second album to feature Simon Cruz as the band's lead singer. It is the first Crashdiet album to feature the same lead singer as its predecessor (Generation Wild), as Dave Lepard committed suicide after their first album, Rest In Sleaze, and H. Olliver Twisted left after the band's second album The Unattractive Revolution.

The first single from "The Savage Playground" was "Cocaine Cowboys", released on 14 December 2012 worldwide on iTunes. Due to an iTunes error, "Cocaine Cowboys" was released on the American iTunes store ten days early, on 4 December 2012. The music video "Cocaine Cowboys" which was released a week after the single, was directed by Richard Frantzen, and ends with the band being gunned down. As of January 2013 a music video (also directed by Frantzen) for "California" has also been filmed but not released.

The original record features 13 songs, though the iTunes version features an extra track titled "Liquid Jesus".

== Charts ==
The album reached the second position on Sverigetopplistan.

== Track listing ==
No.	Title	Writer(s)	Length
1.	"Change the World"	Martin Sweet, Simon Cruz, Eric Young, Peter London	5:34
2.	"Cocaine Cowboys"	Sweet, Linus Nirbrant, Cruz	4:20
3.	"Anarchy"	Young, Cruz	5:29
4.	"California"	Young, Cruz, Sweet	4:33
5.	"Lickin' Dog"	Sweet, Cruz, Young, London	3:07
6.	"Circus"	Young, Cruz	4:43
7.	"Sin City"	Sweet, Cruz	3:26
8.	"Got a Reason"	Sweet, Cruz	4:32
9.	"Drinkin Without You"	Sweet, Cruz	4:12
10.	"Snakes in Paradise"	Sweet, Cruz	4:27
11.	"Damaged Kid"	Sweet, Cruz	3:48
12.	"Excited"	Young, Cruz	5:35
13.	"Garden of Babylon"	Sweet, Cruz	7:13

iTunes version
No.	Title	Writer(s)	Length
14.	"Liquid Jesus"	Cruz, Marco aka "Thin Lazy"	4:16

Japan bonus track
No.	Title	Writer(s)	Length
15.	"Night Hellride"	Sweet, Cruz

=== Bonus ===
1. "Liquid Jesus" iTunes
2. "Night Hellride" Japan

=== Singles ===
- "Cocaine Cowboys"
- "California"

== Personnel ==
- Simon Cruz – vocals, harmonica
- Martin Sweet – guitar
- Peter London – bass
- Eric Young – drums
