= The Local Band =

Finnish rock band

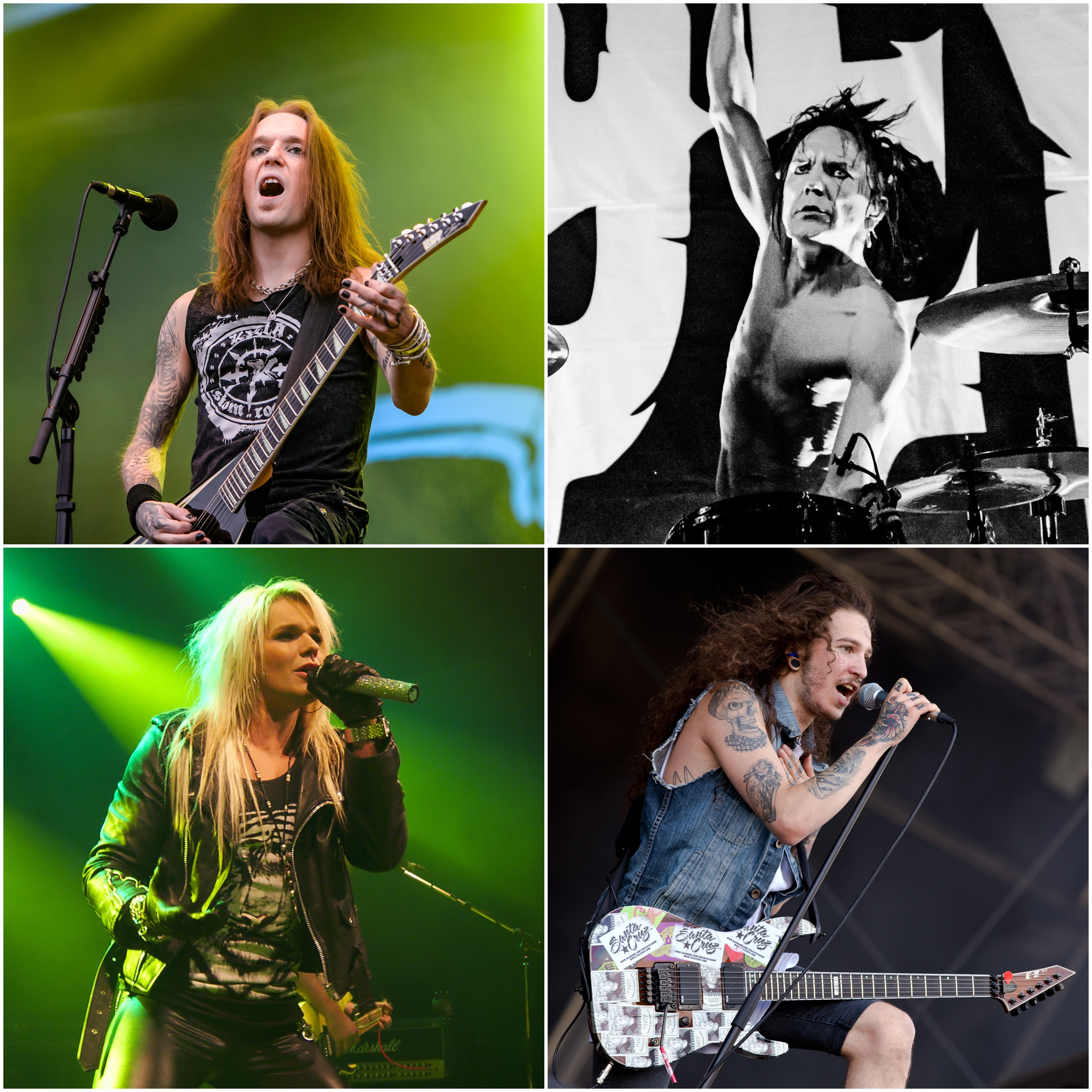
- Clockwise from top left: Alexi Laiho, Jussi 69, Samy Elbanna and Olli Herman

Background information
- Origin: Helsinki, Finland
- Genres: Hard rock
- Years active: 2013–present
- Labels: Sony Music
- Members: Jussi 69; Olli Herman; Samy Elbanna
- Past members: Archie Cruz; Alexi Laiho

The Local Band is a Finnish hard rock supergroup formed in 2013. The band got its start when Children of Bodom's Alexi Laiho and The 69 Eyes' Jussi 69 expressed interest in playing some of their favorite songs together. Jussi 69 then asked Reckless Love frontman Olli Herman to join, and the initial line-up was rounded out by Santa Cruz's Archie Cruz. Dubbed "The Local Band", the group played their first show in December 2013 at the Tavastia Club in Helsinki, which was sold-out. The band then played at the Ruisrock festival in Turku, Finland in July 2014. The group initially intended to play only once a year.

In August 2015, The Local Band once again performed at the Tavastia Club, after which they played for the first time in Japan at the Loud Park Festival in October. In December 2015, the group released an EP of seven cover songs entitled Locals Only – Dark Edition. The release charted at number 20 on the Finnish Album Chart, with the track "Sunglasses at Night" also being released as a single. In August 2016, The Local Band played Nosturi in Helsinki, followed by the WaterXfest in Jyväskylä in September.

In March 2018, the band embarked on a three date Finnish tour, during which Samy Elbanna of Lost Society filled in for Archie Cruz. In June 2018, The Local Band toured Japan and opened for Hollywood Vampires in Helsinki. Afterwards the group announced that Elbanna had replaced Cruz in the band.

== Members ==
Current members

- Jussi 69 – drums (2013–present)
- Olli Herman – vocals (2013–present)
- Samy Elbanna – bass, vocals (2018–present)

Former members

- Archie Cruz – bass, vocals (2013–2018)
- Alexi Laiho – guitar, vocals (2013–2020, died 2020)

== Discography ==
- Locals Only – Dark Edition (2016)
