= Nya Fröken Sverige =

Defunct Swedish beauty pageant

Nya Fröken Sverige (in English: New Miss Sweden) was a Swedish beauty pageant, under administration of the swimsuit producer Panos Emporio. The recruitment process is based on personal interviews and education backgrounds, and no traditional swimsuit competition is arranged. The very first winner Josephine Alhanko competed at the Miss Universe in 2006 and was placed as semi-finalist, but it was later discovered that the two pageants are fundamentally different and the national director decided to abolish international beauty competitions. The contest is a branch of the former Miss Sweden pageant, that existed between 1949 and 2005. Politician Sara Skyttedal participated in 2006 and made it to the final.

The 2006 contest was broadcast in eight countries, due to English oral presentations and became the second most worldwide viewed national beauty pageant, after the Miss USA pageant. In 2009 before crowning Azra Duliman the Nya Fröken Sverige pageant lost the Miss Universe franchise to Miss Universe Sweden organisers. And Renate Cerljen was sent to the Miss Universe 2009 pageant.

== Titleholders ==
| Year | Winner | Location |
|---|---|---|
| 2006 | Josephine Alhanko | Stockholm |
| 2007 | Isabel Lestapier Winqvist (resigned) | Stockholm |
| 2007 | Lina Hahne | Helsingborg |
| 2009 | Azra Duliman | Helsingborg |
