= Martin Sweet =

Swedish rock musician (born 1979)

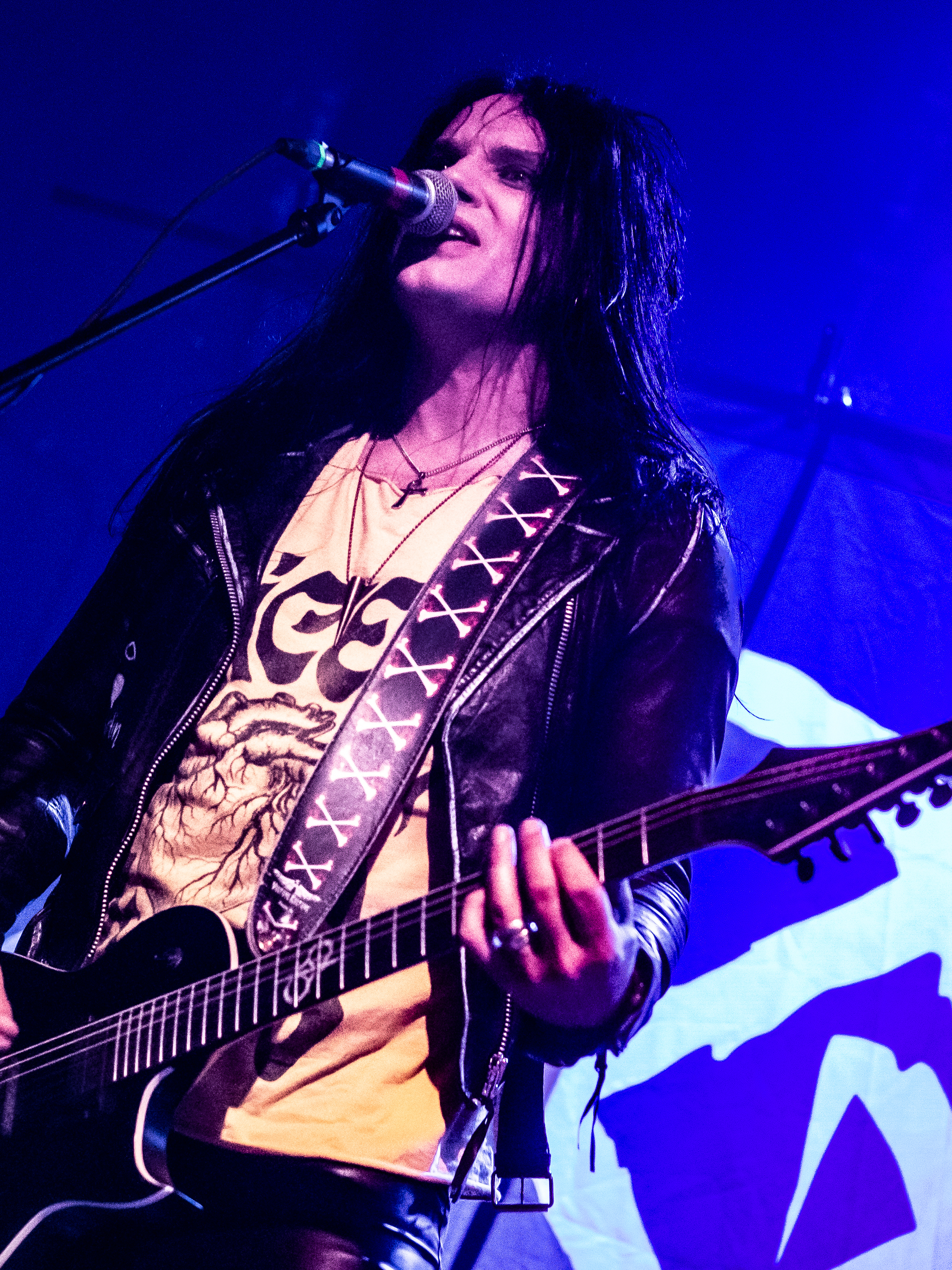

Background information
- Born: Martin Hosselton; 5 May 1979 (age 46); Stockholm, Sweden
- Genres: Glam metal, hard rock, sleaze rock
- Occupation: Musician
- Instruments: Guitar, vocals, bass
- Years active: 2002–present
- Member of: Crashdïet, Sweet Creature
- Formerly of: Sister
- Website: crashdiet.org

Martin Hosselton (born 5 May 1979), known professionally as Martin Sweet, is a Swedish musician most famous for being the lead guitarist for the glam metal band Crashdïet.

== Career ==
Sweet joined the Swedish sleaze band, Crashdïet in 2002 as their guitarist when the then-frontman, Dave Lepard decided to reform the band with new members. The band released their self-titled EP in 2003, and their first full-length album, "Rest in Sleaze" in 2005. The album spawned the singles; "Riot in Everyone", "Knokk 'Em Down", "Breakin' the Chainz", and "It's a Miracle". Tragically, the band's singer, Dave Lepard was found dead 20 January 2006, he had committed suicide. The band decided to go their separate ways after Lepard's death, but later decided to carry on the Crashdïet legacy and keep Dave's spirit alive. During this time period, Martin wrote and recorded many demos (with himself on vocals), but never intended to take Dave's place. The band announced their new singer, H. Olliver Twisted on 21 January 2007 on the first Rest In Sleaze festival that's dedicated to Dave. The band released one album with Twisted as their singer, "The Unattractive Revolution". The album features the singles; "In the Raw" and "Falling Rain". Twisted was let go (or left) Crashdïet in July 2008 and the band started searching for a replacement. Simon Cruz filled in the position of singer in 2009, after leaving his band, Jailbait. They released the album Generation Wild in 2010 which spawned the singles "Generation Wild" and "Chemical". In 2011, Crashdïet opened for Ozzy Osbourne in Stockholm. The year after they opened for Mötley Crüe in Helsinki. In January 2013, they released their latest effort The Savage Playground, which peaked at number 2 on the Swedish charts.

On 24 January, Crashdïet manager Michael Sundén died in the midst of a Crashdïet world tour. In February 2015 lead singer Simon Cruz left Crashdïet. The band has been inactive since although Martin Sweet has said that Crashdïet is not over yet.

In 2016, Sweet joined the Swedish band Sister as a bass player and also formed a new band Sweet Creature, taking the role of a lead vocalist.

== Personal life ==
Sweet married his longtime girlfriend Ika Lillås Lindman in spring 2013.

== Discography ==
=== With Crashdïet ===
- Rest in Sleaze (2005)
- The Unattractive Revolution (2007)
- Generation Wild (2010)
- The Savage Playground (2013)
- Rust (2019)
- Automaton (2022)

=== With Sister ===
- Stand Up, Forward, March! (2016)

=== With Sweet Creature ===
- The Devil Knows My Name (2016)
