= Reckless Love (disambiguation) =

Reckless Love may refer to:

- Reckless Love, a Finnish metal band
  - Reckless Love (Reckless Love album), 2010
- Reckless Love (Cory Asbury album), 2018
  - "Reckless Love (song)", a 2017 single by Cory Asbury
- "Reckless Love", a song by Bleachers from Strange Desire, 2014
