= Isabel Lestapier Winqvist =

Swedish model (born 1987)

- Born: Isabel Lestapier Winqvist; 8 May 1987 (age 38); Helsingborg, Sweden
- Height: 6 ft 0 in (1.83 m)
- Beauty pageant titleholder
- Title: Miss Scania, Miss Sweden Universe 2007 (Resigned June 2007)
- Hair color: Blonde
- Eye color: Brown

Isabel Lestapier Winqvist (born 8 May 1987) is a former Miss Sweden titleholder who resigned.

== Biography ==
Lestapier Winqvist was born in Helsingborg, Sweden and studied business and social science at upper secondary school. She studied at ProCivitas Private Gymnasium. She won the Miss Sweden pageant in her home town, Helsingborg, after several months of a recruitment process. She is the second delegate to be elected by the Panos Emporio Corporation. The competition was televised in eight countries, and therefore all the contestants spoke English. She was crowned on 21 April 2007 by her precursor, Josephine Alhanko, who was semi-finalist at the Miss Universe 2006 pageant, held in Hollywood.

The day after the coronation it became known that she had been featured in the Swedish edition of FHM. Having featured in erotic photographs was against the rules for Miss Sweden contestants, but since she had only featured on bikini pictures rather than topless or in the nude, the owner of the Miss Sweden brand, Panos Emporio, took the decision not to disqualify Lestapier Winqvist. Despite this, she decided to resign from the title 25 June 2007, citing communication problems with the Swedish sponsors. She had the shortest Swedish reign of all times. Her first runner-up, Lina Hahne became the new titleholder.

Lestapier Winqvist married Peter London, bassist from the Swedish glam metal band Crashdïet, on 25 June 2010 at the Hedvig Eleonora Church in Stockholm. The couple got divorced in March 2012.

In July 2014, Lestapier Winqvist married businessman Hans Isoz in Stockholm. In May 2015, their daughter Henrietta was born.
