= Sister (Swedish band) =

Swedish rock band

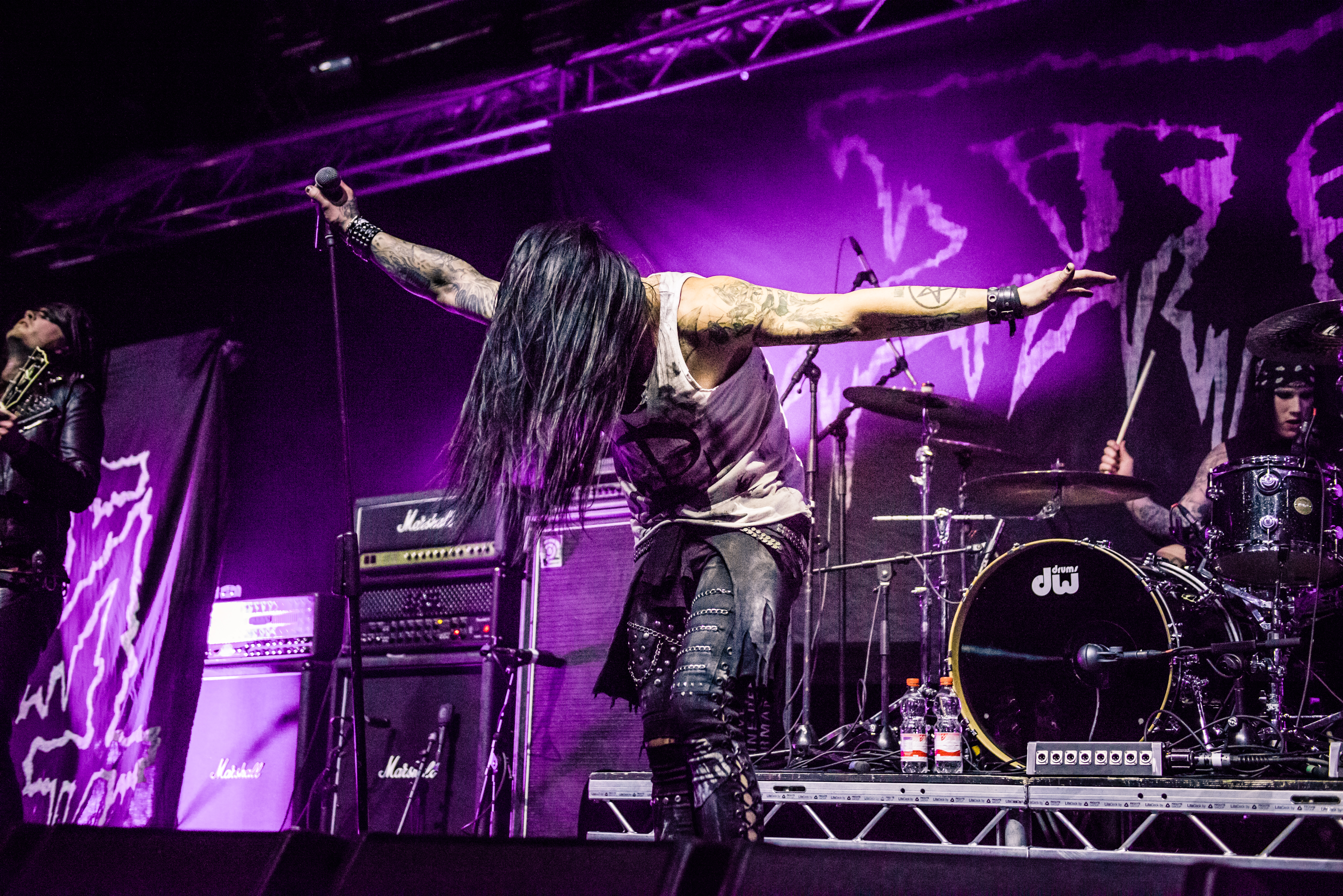
- Sister performing in Germany, 2016

Background information
- Origin: Stockholm and Jönköping, Sweden
- Genres: Sleaze rock; glam metal; glam punk; hard rock
- Years active: 2006–present
- Labels: Metal Blade; Flick Records; Icons Creating Evil Art
- Members: Jamie Anderson; Cari Crow; Freddan Hiitomaa; Axl Ludwig
- Past members: Dani; Lestat Winters; Rikki Riot; Tim Tweak; Martin Sweet; Phil Armfelt
- Website: sisterofficial.com

Sister is a Swedish sleaze rock/metal band from Stockholm and Jönköping, formed in 2006.

== History ==
Sister was formed in early 2006 by drummer Cari Crow and then-guitarist Dani. Singer Jamie Anderson, who was still active in another band at the time, left that band and joined the duo. After several gigs, bassist Rikki Riot joined Sister. Regarding the band name, Cari joked, "It has no deeper meaning. I think it's a great name. I had the name in my head for some time and tried to mix it with other names. But somehow it only became Sister. Four guys with makeup release an album called 'Hated' and call themselves Sister. It can't get any better! People are going to freak out."

Several demos were recorded and sold in self-distribution, especially at their own concerts. In 2008, the band toured Europe with Private Line. In 2009, they recorded the EP Deadboys Making Noise and shot a music video for the song "Too Bad for You". Through Alan Averill of Primordial, who also worked as an assistant A&R at Metal Blade Records, a record deal with that label came together in 2010.

In June 2011, Sister's debut album Hated was released. It placed seventh in the editorial charts of the July issue of Rock Hard and was included in the "10x Dynamit" category. Subsequently, the band played at Sweden Rock Festival and Bang Your Head in Germany. At the end of the year, Sister went on tour together with American band Fozzy. In late 2012, Lestat Winters left Sister for personal reasons. For him, guitarist Tim Tweak joined the formation. 2013 saw the band tour the UK together with Skid Row and continental Europe with Wednesday 13.

In 2014, the group's second album Disguised Vultures was released, again via Metal Blade Records. German website metal.de praised the album as "sleaze-laden punk with guitars that kick you in the ass so hard they have to be surgically removed", but sees it as somewhat weaker overall than its predecessor.

After nine years with Sister, bassist Rikki Riot announced his departure in January 2016, citing the desire for a change. Four days later, Sister announced that Martin Sweet of Crashdïet would succeed him. In 2020, Sweet was replaced by Freddan Hiitomaa of the glam metal band Dust Bowl Jokies, which disbanded in 2019. The split is said to have been amicable, simply because Sweet lacked time for Sister. In late 2020, the band announced its departure from the label Metal Blade and a collaboration with Flick Agency.

== Musical style ==
Sister plays sleaze rock in the style of Crashdïet and Crazy Lixx. Their music is further in the style of 1980s hair metal bands like Skid Row and Mötley Crüe, and contains genre-typical elements of punk. The lyrics are generally dark and offer partly ironic horror themes, which has led to comparisons with horror punk/metal bands Murderdolls and Wednesday 13. However, the group sees themselves as more of a party band that "doesn't have much in common with horror punk". In an interview with singer Jamie Anderson, he used the term "sleaze punk", but also described it as "black sleaze", which a fan had come up with.

German website Neckbreaker argued that it would be "too easy" to simply classify Sister as a sleaze band, and that there was "much more than that hiding underneath". Jamie Anderson's vocal delivery "often reminds of various black metal bands, the structure of the songs, however, very often reminds of punk rock. Overall, the band has their completely own style and combines these different genres, which produces an interesting mixture."

== Band members ==
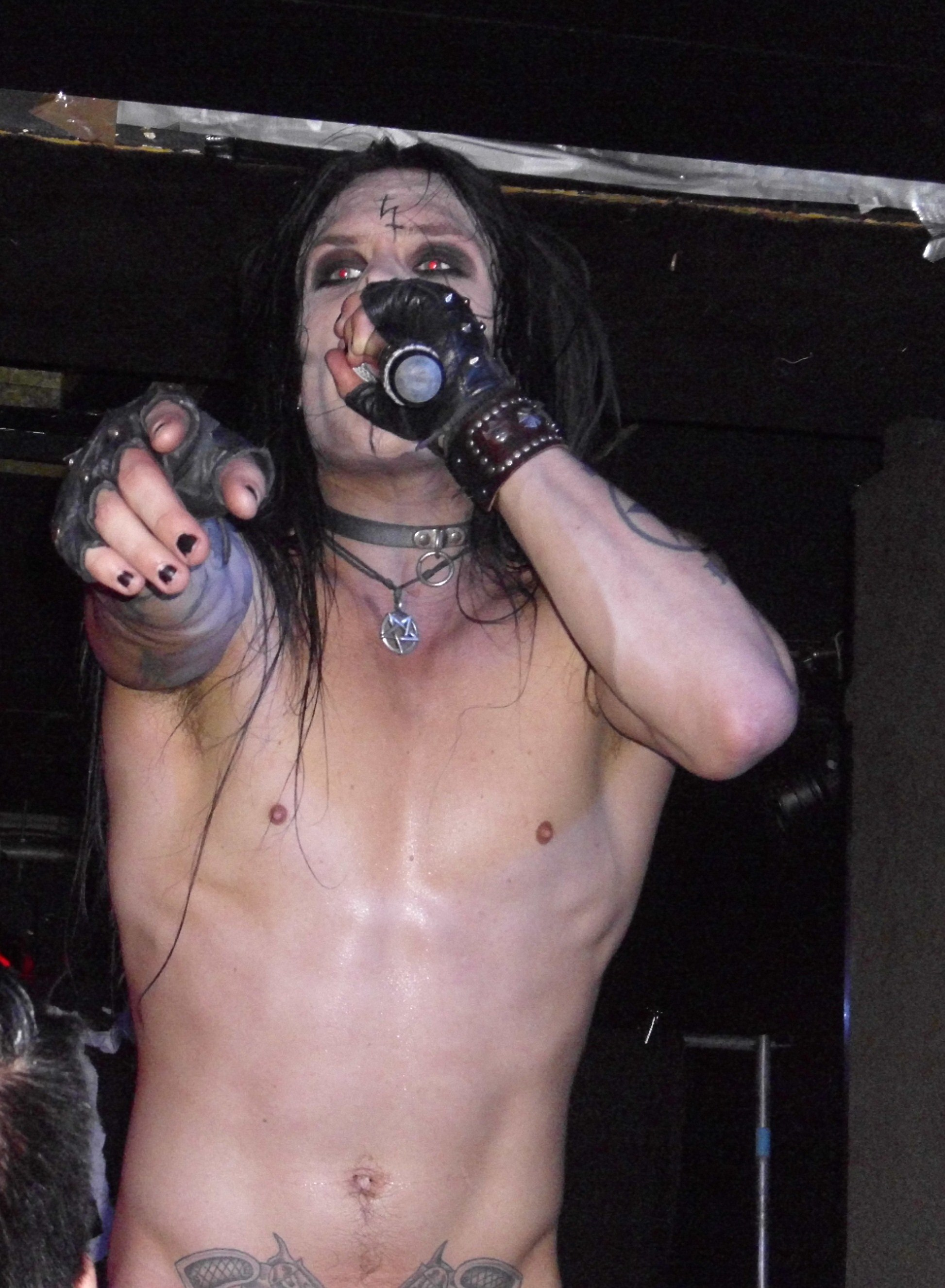
Frontman Jamie Anderson

- Jamie Anderson – vocals
- Cari Crow – drums
- Freddan Hiitomaa – bass (since 2020)
- Axl Ludwig – guitar (since 2023)

Former members

- Dani – guitar (2006–2011)
- Lestat Winters – guitar (2011–2012)
- Rikki Riot – bass (2007–2016)
- Tim Tweak – guitar (2012–2018)
- Martin Sweet – bass (2016–2020)
- Phil Armfelt – guitar (2018-2022)

== Discography ==
Albums

- 2011: Hated
- 2014: Disguised Vultures
- 2016: Stand Up, Forward, March!
- 2021: Vengeance Ignited
- 2025: The Way We Fall

EPs

- 2009: Deadboys Making Noise

Singles

- 2013: Sick (7" vinyl)
- 2020: Die with a Smile
- 2020: Primal Rage

Demos

- 2007: Ain't Going Home
- 2007: Get Down n' Boogie
