= It's a Miracle =

It's a Miracle can refer to:

- "It's a Miracle" (Barry Manilow song), 1975 song
- "It's a Miracle" (Culture Club song), 1983 song
- "It's a Miracle" (Crashdïet song), 2005 song
- "It's a Miracle", a song by Roger Waters from the album Amused to Death
- It's a Miracle (TV series), a PAX TV show
