= In the Raw (song) =

2007 single by Crashdïet

Single by Crashdïet

from the album The Unattractive Revolution
- A-side: "In the Raw"
- B-side: "In the Raw (instrumental version)"
- Released: 5 September 2007
- Recorded: 2007
- Genre: Glam metal, hard rock
- Length: 3:46
- Label: Universal Music
- Songwriters: H. Olliver Twisted, Martin Sweet

Crashdïet singles chronology
"It's a Miracle" (2005)	"In the Raw" (2007)	"Falling Rain" (2008)

"In the Raw" is a 2007 single by Swedish glam metal band Crashdïet. It was the first single to feature the band's new lead singer H. Olliver Twisted on vocals, since their original singer Dave Lepard died in January 2006. This song appears as the opening track on the band's 2007 album, The Unattractive Revolution. The song debuted at #35 on the Swedish singles chart. The song's name and chorus is based on the album Live... in the Raw by the heavy metal band W.A.S.P which have been a major influence on the sound of Crashdïet.

== Track listing ==
1. "In the Raw"
2. "In the Raw" (instrumental version)

== Personnel ==
- H. Olliver Twisted – vocals
- Martin Sweet – guitar
- Peter London – bass
- Eric Young – drums
