= Lina Hahne =

Lina Maria Hahne (born 15 January 1984) is a Swedish beauty queen and Miss Sweden 2007 titleholder, who was crowned on June 26 after the original winner Isabel Lestapier Winqvist was dethroned from the title. It seems that Lina won't be a representative for Sweden at Miss Universe 2008 after several unsuccessful attempts to participate and the sponsor has most probably dropped out for the future pageants. In the end Miss Sweden organization boycotted the event for a second year in a row. Lina is currently studying to become a doctor in the last year of Medical School. She is involved in UNICEF and children charities.

== Year as Miss Sweden ==
The new concept is in line with the vision of Miss Universe. Both visions aim to find a good representative for the modern woman of today. On the basis of the society of today and its development the organization has decided to modernize the Miss Sweden concept. New elements are added and the candidates need to pass a mandatory competence prediction which is focused on how the person is able to manage different situations. Based on the results of the tests the personalities of the candidates will be defined. Another new aspect is an ethical advisory board which is involved to be consulted by the organization in different matters and elements.

== 2008 ==
Beside working alongside UNICEF, Lina is currently an activist for women's right in Sweden. She has appeared in television and radio shows. She will be living in Luleå to study medicine after living five weeks in Vietnam.

A new Miss Sweden was crowned on April 30, 2009, and from then Linas obligations as Miss Sweden was ended. When Azra Duliman took over the crown
