= Generation Wild =

Studio album by Crashdïet
- Released: 09 April 2010
- Recorded: 2009
- Genre: Glam metal, hard rock
- Length: 40:19
- Label: Universal Music / Gain Records
- Producer: RamPac (Johan Ramström and Patrik Magnusson)

Crashdïet chronology
The Unattractive Revolution (2007)	Generation Wild (2010)	The Savage Playground (2013)

Singles from Generation Wild
- 1. "Generation Wild" Released: 26 February 2010; 2. "Chemical" Released: 21 September 2010; 3. "Sick Mind" Released: 19 May 2023

Professional ratings
Review scores
Source	Rating
AllMusic	4/5 stars

Generation Wild is the third studio album by Swedish glam metal band Crashdïet. The album was released on 14 April 2010. It is the first album to feature the band's new vocalist Simon Cruz since the departure of their previous singer H. Olliver Twisted. The album debuted at #3 on the Swedish Album Chart. The title track, Generation Wild, was released as the first single on 26 February 2010. The video was banned from MTV due to obscene images. The original record features 11 songs but five bonus track were also recorded and released on different editions of the album.

On 7 June 2011, Generation Wild was released in the United States through Frontiers Records.

Scottish musician Johnny Gunn (singer of Peep Show), previously considered a potential new vocalist, contributed to several of the album's songs.

== Track listing ==
Generation Wild track listing
No.	Title	Lyrics	Music	Length
1.	"442 (Intro)"		Martin Sweet; Johan Ramström; Patrik Magnusson	0:53
2.	"Armageddon"	Simon Cruz	Sweet; Ramström; Magnusson	4:06
3.	"So Alive"	Sweet; Johnny Gunn; Cruz	Sweet; Gunn	4:12
4.	"Generation Wild"	Cruz; Sweet; Peter London; Eric Young; Ramström; Magnusson	Cruz; Sweet; London; Young; Ramström; Magnusson	3:55
5.	"Rebel"	Cruz	Sweet; Cruz	3:23
6.	"Save Her"	Gunn	Sweet; Gunn	3:26
7.	"Down With the Dust"	Young	Young	2:47
8.	"Native Nature"	Cruz	Sweet; Cruz; Ramström; Magnusson	4:28
9.	"Chemical"	Sweet; Gunn	Sweet; Gunn	4:16
10.	"Bound to Fall"	Young; Cruz; London	Young; Cruz; London	4:15
11.	"Beautiful Pain"	Cruz	Sweet	4:42
Total length:				40:19

Bonus Tracks
No.	Title	Lyrics	Length
12.	"Sick Mind"	Sweet	4:40
13.	"One of a Kind"	Sweet; London; Gunn	4:36
14.	"Fear Control"	Young; Sweet; Gunn	4:12
15.	"Caught in Despair"	Cruz; Sweet; London; Young	4:17
16.	"Hollywood Teaze"	Sweet	3:10

== Singles ==
- "Generation Wild"
- "Chemical"
- "Sick Mind"

== Personnel ==
- Simon Cruz – vocals
- Martin Sweet – guitar, backing vocals
- Peter London – bass, backing vocals
- Eric Young – drums, backing vocals
