= Eric Young =

Eric Young may refer to:

- Eric Young Sr. (born 1967), American baseball coach and former Major League Baseball second baseman and left fielder
- Eric Young Jr. (born 1985), his son, American baseball coach and former baseball second baseman and outfielder
- Eric Young (cyclist) (born 1989), American professional cyclist
- Eric Young (footballer, born 1952), English football player for Darlington
- Eric Young (footballer, born 1960), Welsh international football player
- Eric Young (wrestler) (born 1979), ring name used by Jeremy Fritz
- Eric Young (broadcaster), New Zealand journalist and television presenter
- Eric Young (American football) (born 1983), offensive guard at the University of Tennessee
- Eric Young (born 1984), drummer for Swedish rock band Crashdïet
- Eric Templeton Young (1892–1915), Scottish rugby player
- Sir Eric Young (rugby union) (1891–1973), Scotland international rugby union player
