= Turborider =

Studio album by Reckless Love
- Released: 25 March 2022
- Genre: Pop metal, synth-metal
- Length: 35:09
- Label: AFM
- Producer: Joonas Parkkonen

Reckless Love chronology
InVader (2016)	Turborider (2022)

Singles from Turborider
- 1. "Outrun" Released: 10 September 2021; 2. "Eyes of a Maniac" Released: 19 November 2021; 3. "Turborider" Released: 21 January 2022; 4. "Bark at the Moon" Released: 4 March 2022

Turborider is the fifth album by Finnish rock band Reckless Love, released on 25 March 2022 through AFM Records and produced by Joonas Parkkonen. It was originally scheduled for a 25 February release, but was postponed due to limitations imposed by the COVID-19 pandemic that prevented them from distributing the physical copies of the album.

It was released as CD, LP, and a special box set which includes a portable video game.

The first single and clip (directed by Pete Voutilainen Regie), "Outrun", were released on 10 September 2021. The second single, "Eyes of a Maniac", came out on 19 November 2021. The title track was released as the third single on 21 January 2022, with a video coming ten days later. Their cover of Ozzy Osbourne's "Bark at the Moon" was released as the fourth single on 4 March 2022.

== Track listing ==
Turborider track listing
No.	Title	Writer(s)	Length
1.	"Turborider"	Olli Herman, Pepe Reckless, Jonas Parkkonen	4:25
2.	"Eyes of a Maniac"	Herman, Reckless, Parkkonen	3:21
3.	"Outrun"	Herman, Reckless, Janne Rintala, Mika Laakonen	3:11
4.	"Kids of the Arcade"	Herman, Reckless, Parkkonen	3:34
5.	"Bark at the Moon"	Ozzy Osbourne, Jake E. Lee, Bob Daisley	4:13
6.	"Prelude (Flight of the Cobra)" (instrumental)	Herman, Reckless, Parkkonen	0:47
7.	"Like a Cobra"	Herman, Reckless, Parkkonen	3:01
8.	"For the Love of Good Times"	Herman, Reckless, Parkkonen	3:02
9.	"'89 Sparkle"	Herman, Reckless, Parkkonen	3:16
10.	"Future Lover Boy"	Herman, Reckless, Parkkonen	3:02
11.	"Prodigal Sons"	Herman, Reckless, Parkkonen	3:17
Total length:			35:09

Japan edition bonus track
No.	Title	Length
12.	"Love Reckless"	3:58
Total length:		39:13

== Reception ==
Professional ratings
Review scores
Source	Rating
Angry Metal Guy	3.0/5.0
Brave Words & Bloody Knuckles	9.0/10
Metal Hammer (Germany)	4/7
Soundi	3/5 stars

Nick Balazs from Brave Words & Bloody Knuckles conceded that Turborider would be "a divisive record". He was grateful that guitarist Pepe, albeit taking "a back seat", still managed to "show off his skills and flourishes rhythmically and in loud and proud soloing". He praised the band for "creating this blend of synth-pop metal by keeping the tracks short and to the point" and finished his review saying that "Turborider blasts the past into the future and its bold direction is worthy of applause. [...] if any band was capable to make a successful shift like this, it's the boys from Reckless Love.

On Tuonela Magazine, Andrea C. said that "it's fair to say that the aesthetical and musical choices for "Turborider" may not be everyone's cup of tea but you at least have to respect the band's moxie for sticking to their vision." He disliked their cover of Ozzy Osbourne's "Bark at the Moon" and commented that "the synths and dance beats are fun and enjoyable, but the fact that almost every song has this computerized layer added to the vocals does take its toll on the ear after a while". He admitted that the album is "a bit listener-specific as it doesn't cater to everyone's taste. [...] RECKLESS LOVE took a pretty big risk coming out of their 5-year slumber with such a record and only time can tell if their gamble paid off or not."

In a mixed review for Angry Metal Guy, El Cuervo said the first run-through of the album "was great fun", but from the second one on he noticed "the album is so bite-sized, so over-produced, so lyrically-superficial that it almost felt manufactured". He concluded that the band is "economical above all else, writing with exactly as many solid bridges, choruses and solos as are required" but criticized the production for being "all loud, sterile and arguably obnoxious."

Soundi's Mape Ollila compared Turborider to Judas Priest's Turbo in that it is "a bold and big but also vaguely questionable step out of a well-perceived formula". He acknowledged the band's capability to still write hard songs, but also thought the Ozzy Osbourne cover was "unnecessary".

On the German edition of Metal Hammer, Matthias Mineur described the album as a mixture of "Duran Duran and Abba with recurring quotes from Def Leppard from the Hysteria era and stoic disco grooves". He thought it was "logical that Reckless Love give their new disc a sterile, almost plastic-like sound".

== Personnel ==
- Olli Herman – lead vocals
- Pepe Reckless – lead guitar
- Hessu Maxx – drums
- Jalle Verne – bass guitar
- Joonas Parkkonen – production
- Svante Forsbäck – mastering

== Charts ==
Chart performance for Turborider
Chart (2022)	Peak position
Finnish Albums (Suomen virallinen lista)	3
Swiss Albums (Schweizer Hitparade)	84
