= Spirit (Reckless Love album) =

Studio album by Reckless Love
- Released: 2 September 2013
- Recorded: 2013
- Genre: Glam metal, heavy metal, hard rock
- Length: 41:55
- Label: Universal Music, Spinefarm
- Producer: Ikka Wirtanen, Reckless Love

Reckless Love chronology
Animal Attraction (2011)	Spirit (2013)	InVader (2016)

Spirit is the third album by Finnish glam metal band Reckless Love, released on 2 September 2013 through Spinefarm Records / Universal Music. The album peaked at No. 3 on Finland Albums Top 50 music chart.

== Track listing ==
All tracks are written by Olli Herman, Pepe Reckless and Ikka Wirtanen except "Metal Ass", written by Olli Herman, Pepe Reckless, and Jalle Verne

No.	Title	Length
1.	"Night on Fire"	3:26
2.	"Bad Lovin'"	3:52
3.	"I Love Heavy Metal"	4:08
4.	"Favorite Flavor"	3:09
5.	"Edge of Our Dreams"	3:48
6.	"Sex, Drugs & Reckless Love"	3:15
7.	"Dying to Live"	4:19
8.	"Metal Ass"	2:21
9.	"Runaway Love"	4:15
10.	"So Happy I Could Die"	4:10
11.	"Hot Rain"	5:12

UK Bonus Track
No.	Title	Length
12.	"Die Hard"	4:26

Japan Bonus Tracks
No.	Title	Length
12.	"Angel Falling"	4:15

== Reception ==
Professional ratings
Review scores
Source	Rating
Hard Rock Haven	10/10 stars
Metal Talk	4/5 stars
Metal Temple	6/10 stars
Sputnik Music	4/5 stars

The album received mixed reception from critics, who praised it for trying to bring the glam metal genre back to popularity, but criticized it for its poppish approach.

== Chart performance ==
Chart	Peak position
Finnish Albums Chart	3

== Personnel ==
Reckless Love

- Olli Herman – lead vocals
- Pepe Reckless – lead guitar
- Hessu Maxx – drums
- Jalle Verne – bass guitar

Production

- Produced by Ikka Wirtanen
- Mastered by Pauli Saastamoinen at Finnvox, Finland, 2013
