= Simon Cruz =

Swedish rock singer

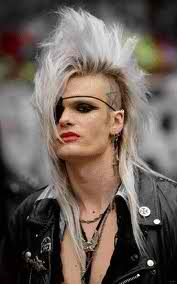

Background information
- Also known as: Simme; Zymon Xaint; Zimmy South
- Born: Simon Söderström; 26 July 1979 (age 46)
- Origin: Sweden
- Genres: Sleaze rock, glam metal, hard rock
- Occupations: Singer, musician
- Instruments: Vocals, guitar
- Years active: 2009–present
- Formerly of: Crashdïet

Simon Cruz (born Simon Söderström; 26 July 1979) is a Swedish singer best known as the former lead singer for the sleaze rock band Crashdïet.

== Biography ==
=== Pre-Crashdïet ===
Details of Cruz's early life, such as his childhood are virtually unknown. At some point in his twenties, he lived in London, England, which he has cited as the reason he has a British accent. Cruz was in several bands prior to Crashdïet: Foxey, T.I.T.S., and most notably Jailbait. In previous bands, he went by the aliases of Zymon Xaint and Zimmy South.

=== Crashdïet ===
When Crashdïet auditioned people to replace their original lead singer Dave Lepard after his death in January 2006, Cruz was their top choice. Cruz, however, decided to continue with his band Jailbait, causing Crashdïet to go with H. Olliver Twisted as their new lead singer. Upon H. Olliver Twisted being kicked out of Crashdïet in 2008, they were once again in search of a new singer. The band sought out Cruz again, and in July 2009, they announced him as their new lead singer. He made his debut performance with the band in October 2009 at the Sweden Rock Cruise.
Cruz has toured Europe, South America, Australia, and North America with Crashdiet. He is the first Crashdïet singer to be featured on two consecutive albums, appearing on 2010's Generation Wild (Crashdïet's most popular album to date) and 2013's The Savage Playground.

In February 2015, Crashdïet announced Cruz's departure.

=== Savage Animal ===
After leaving Crashdïet, Cruz began to work with his ex-girlfriend Tåve Wanning (Peaches, Adrenaline Rush) on a common music project called Savage Animal.

== Discography ==
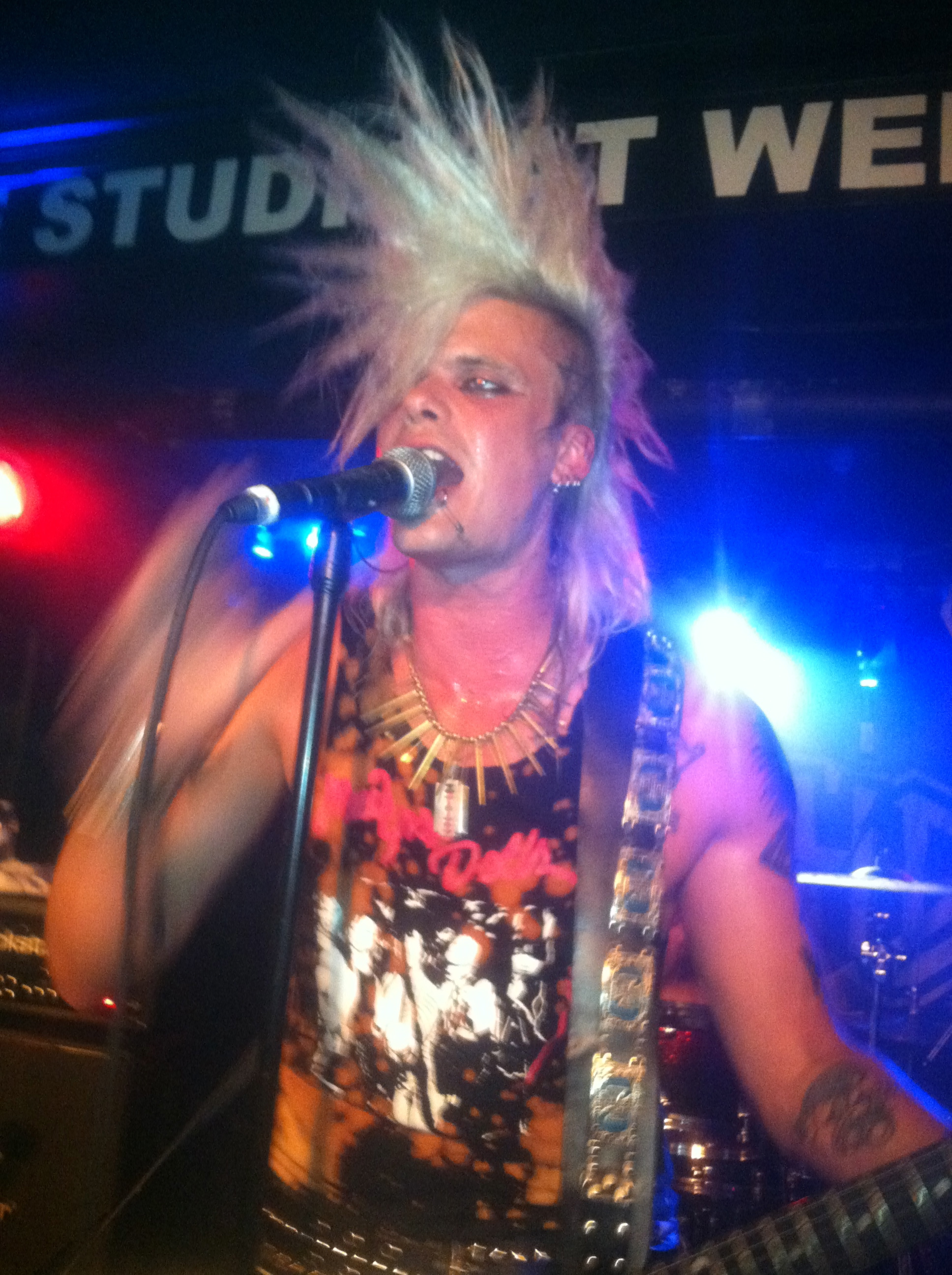
Cruz performing in 2012

=== With Crashdïet ===
- Generation Wild (2010)
- The Savage Playground (2013)
