= Animal Attraction =

Studio album by Reckless Love
- Released: 7 November 2011
- Genre: Glam metal, heavy metal, hard rock
- Length: 42:45
- Label: Spinefarm

Reckless Love chronology
Reckless Love (2010)	Animal Attraction (2011)	Spirit (2013)

Animal Attraction is the second album from Finnish glam metal band Reckless Love. It was released on 7 November 2011 through Spinefarm Records and debuted at number 10 on the national Finnish Charts.

== Track list ==
No.	Title	Length
1.	"Animal Attraction"	3:28
2.	"Speedin'"	3:53
3.	"Born to Break Your Heart"	4:02
4.	"Hot"	3:22
5.	"Fantasy"	5:12
6.	"Dirty Dreams"	3:31
7.	"Dance"	3:28
8.	"Fight"	3:04
9.	"Switchblade Babe"	4:56
10.	"On the Radio"	3:38
11.	"Coconuts"	4:08

UK bonus track
No.	Title	Length
12.	"Young 'N' Crazy"	3:22

Japan bonus track
No.	Title	Length
12.	"Push"	3:35

== Singles ==
Single	Release date	Chart performance
Hot	Feb 2011	18
Animal Attraction	Sept 2011	-
On the Radio	TBA	-

== Personnel ==
- Olli Herman Kosunen - lead vocals
- Perttu 'Pepe Reckless' Salohalme - guitar, backing vocals
- Hessu Maxx - drums, percussion
- Jalle Verne - bass, backing vocals

== Additional Personnel ==
- Ilkka Wirtanen - keyboards, songwriter
