= Riot in Everyone =

Single by Crashdïet

from the album Rest in Sleaze
- A-side: "Riot in Everyone"
- B-side: "Out of Line"
- Released: 2005
- Recorded: 2004
- Genre: Glam metal, hard rock
- Length: 3:57
- Label: Universal Music
- Songwriters: Dave Lepard, Martin Sweet

Crashdïet singles chronology
"Riot in Everyone" (2005)	"Knokk 'Em Down" (2005)

"Riot in Everyone" is a 2005 single by Swedish glam metal band Crashdïet. This was the first single for the band and it appears on their 2005 debut album Rest in Sleaze. With a #33 chart position, "Riot in Everyone" is Crashdïet's highest charting single.

== Track listing ==
=== CD single ===
1. Riot in Everyone
2. Out of Line

=== Digital Single ===
1. Riot in Everyone
2. Riot in Everyone (Demo)

== Personnel ==
- Dave Lepard - vocals, guitar
- Martin Sweet - guitar
- Peter London - bass
- Eric Young - drums

== Chart performance ==
Chart (2005)	Peak position
Sweden (Sverigetopplistan)	33
