= InVader =

Studio album by Reckless Love
- Released: 4 March 2016
- Genre: Glam metal, hard rock
- Length: 40:54
- Label: Spinefarm
- Producer: Ikka Wirtanen

Reckless Love chronology
Spirit (2013)	InVader (2016)	Turborider (2022)

InVader is the fourth album by Finnish glam metal band Reckless Love, released on 4 March 2016 through Spinefarm Records.

== Track listing ==
All songs written by Olli Herman, Pepe Reckless, and Ikka Wirtanen, unless otherwise noted.

No.	Title	Writer(s)	Length
1.	"We Are the Weekend"		4:21
2.	"Hands"		4:10
3.	"Monster"		3:48
4.	"Child of the Sun"		3:58
5.	"Bullettime"	Herman, Reckless	4:01
6.	"Scandinavian Girls"		3:47
7.	"Pretty Boy Swagger"	Jurek Reunamaki, Herman, Reckless	3:25
8.	"Rock It"		3:57
9.	"Destiny"		3:59
10.	"Let's Get Cracking (THWP)"		5:28
Total length:			40:54

== Reception ==
Professional ratings
Review scores
Source	Rating
Classic Rock	3/5 stars
Dangerdog Music Reviews	5.0/5.0
Brave Words & Bloody Knuckles	8.5/10
Sea of Tranquility	2/10 stars
Soundi.fi	4/5 stars
Ultimate Guitar	7/10

Writing for Classic Rock, Johnny Sharp pointed out the pop elements of several songs as "flagrant attempts to make radio-friendly sing-alongs" and ultimately said "we realise all this, as someone once sang, ain't nothin' but a good time. That's what they'll tell the taste police anyway."

On Dangerdog, Craig Hartranft said the boys "write some quality rock n roll tunes. Damn catchy rock n roll tunes", praised their individual performances and said "it's probably fair to say that there's not a single bad song on this album".

Nick Balazs from Brave Words & Bloody Knuckles also noted the pop and even rap incursions of the band, but felt they "retain the fun, positive-natured attitude of Reckless Love". He concluded his review by saying: "Some of these newer sounds on InVader are questionable, but I absolutely commend a band for not resting on their laurels and trying something new."

An unsigned review by Ultimate Guitar's team states that the album "shows the members of this vicious group leaning closer and closer towards a more mainstream sound [...] by blending aggressive rock guitar with melodic refrains and a plush production." They said the final impression with InVader is "how Reckless Love were able to once again achieve that vintage rock sound" and concluded by saying that "the album retains enough of their signature glam metal attitude to remain standout [...] there are enough memorable moments throughout "InVader" to catch the interest of familiar listeners and constitute picking a copy up for their own collection."

In a less positive review, Sea of Tranquility's Steven Reid said "the Reckless lads made no secret out of their desire to broaden their sound, however I can't say I expected that to result in an album so throwaway, so lightweight, so utterly lacking in the rock that made this band's name, that it's barely recognisable." He went on to say that InVader "possesses three or four songs that stand up to repeat listens. The rest? Well, it isn't even particularly good pop music and in the throwaway stakes it's as here today and gone tomorrow as space hoppers and deely boppers."

== Chart performance ==
Chart	Peak position
Finnish Albums (Suomen virallinen lista)	8

== Personnel ==
Reckless Love

- Olli Herman – lead vocals
- Pepe Reckless – lead guitar
- Hessu Maxx – drums
- Jalle Verne – bass guitar
- Produced by Ikka Wirtanen
