= Santa Cruz (band) =

Finnish-American hard rock band

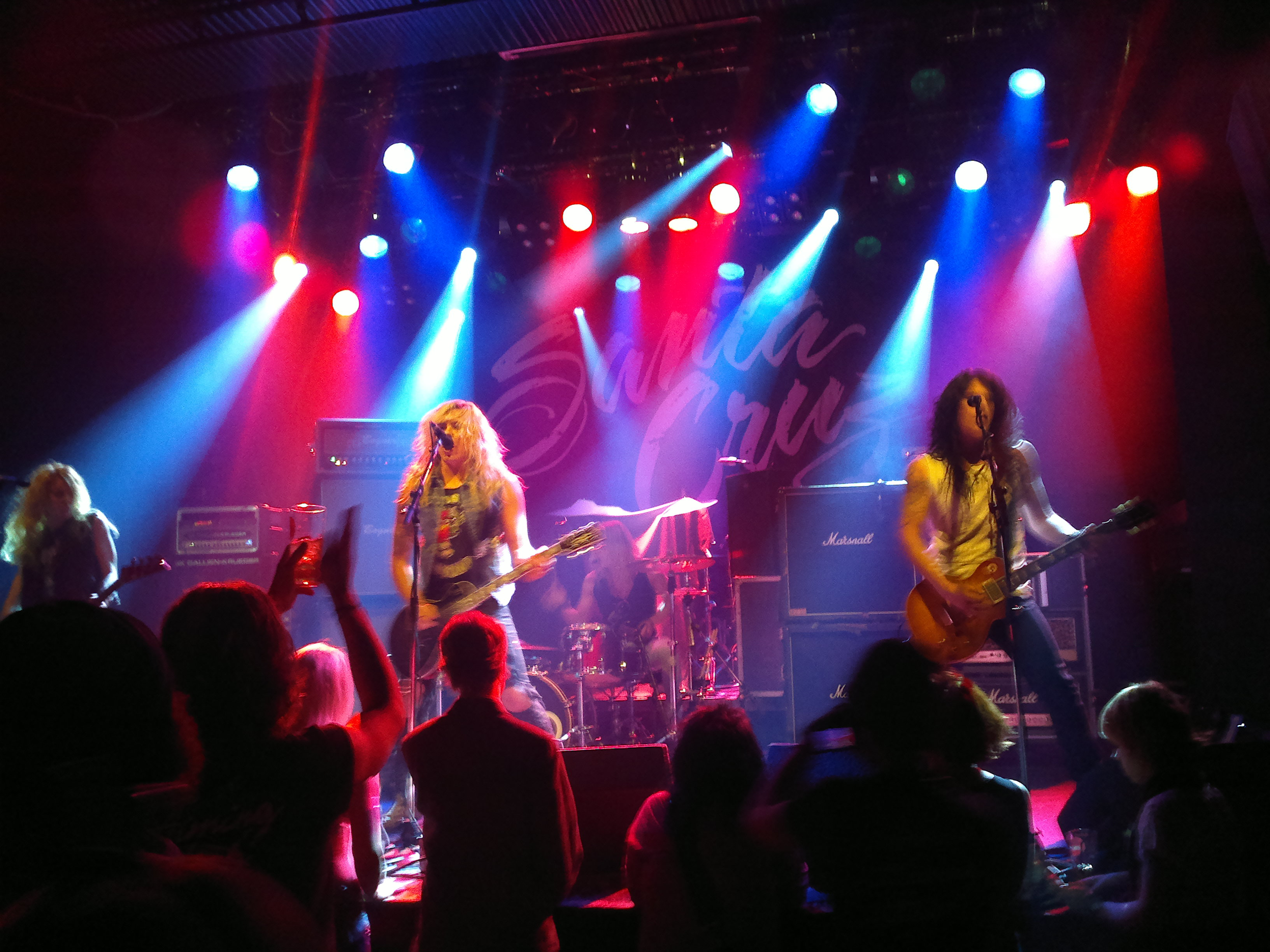
- Santa Cruz in 2012

Background information
- Origin: Helsinki, Finland
- Genres: Glam metal, heavy metal, hard rock, glamcore
- Years active: 2007–2024
- Labels: Spinefarm (2012–2015); Universal Music Group (2016); M-Theory Audio (2017–2021, 2022–2023); Young & Restless Records (2021–2022); Ranka Kustannus (2023–2024)
- Past members: Archie Cruz; Johnny Cruz; Middy Cruz; Taz Cruz; Leo Stillman; Tomi Pulkkinen; Jordan Marshall; Pav Popov; Eemi Lamberg; Joe Perez; Toxy London; Jerry Jade; Randy McDemian; Tommy Bradley; Alex Mercado; Luke Man; Brody DeRozie; Wade Murff
- Website: www.santacruzbandofficial.com

Santa Cruz was a Finnish hard rock band formed in 2007 in Helsinki by Archie Cruz and Johnny Parkkonen. The band's music has appeared in TV commercials for Mercedes-Benz and in sports compilations on ESPN.

Vocalist and guitarist Archie Cruz has appeared in The Local Band lineup with Alexi Laiho (of Children of Bodom), Olli Herman (of Reckless Love) and Jussi 69 (of the 69 Eyes).

== History ==
=== Formation and demos (2007–2013) ===
Arttu Kuosmanen and Joonas Parkkonen formed Santa Cruz in 2007, with bassist Mitja Toivonen joining in 2008. The band released two demos in 2008–2009. After changing a number of temporary drummers, they settled for a full-time drummer, Taz Fagerström in 2009, becoming a four-member band. The band released a self-released EP of six songs titled Anthems for the Young 'n' Restless, which helped them get signed with Finnish record label Spinefarm Records in 2012

=== Screaming for Adrenaline (2013–2015) ===
The band released their first studio album Screaming for Adrenaline in April 2013. The album reached No. 27 on the Finnish album chart. The band had live shows in England, Belgium, and Germany in 2013. The cover sleeve was designed by Rüdiger Monroy Duarte

=== Santa Cruz and Skydiving Without a Parachute (2015–2016) ===
Their eponymous second album Santa Cruz was released in March 2015. The album featured a heavier sound than the previous and the band has described its sound as "glamcore". The album debuted as No. 3 on Finnish album chart. In 2015, the band made a European tour of 27 gigs. In 2016, the band toured with Sebastian Bach in the U.S. In June 2016, Santa Cruz released the single "Sky Diving Without a Parachute".

=== Drag Me Down and Bad Blood Rising (2016–2017) ===
In late 2016, the band released a cover of One Direction's "Drag Me Down". The band released their third album, Bad Blood Rising in November 2017, featuring the singles "River Phoenix" and "Young Blood Rising."

=== New lineup and Katharsis (2018–2022) ===
On 18 March 2018, the band, through their social media accounts, announced the cancellation of their upcoming U.S. tour as well as the departure of Johnny, Middy and Taz, leaving Archie as the sole original member of the band.

On 16 April 2018, Brody DeRozie was announced as the band's new guitarist, however on 22 May 2018, Brody announced his departure from Santa Cruz.

On 7 July 2018, Archie posted a video on his YouTube channel, featuring new Santa Cruz guitarist, Pav Cruz. On 3 August 2018, Jordan Marshall was announced as the band's new drummer, however on 31 January 2019 Jordan left the band, three days into tour rehearsal.

In early 2019, drummer Toxy Cruz, and bassist Ero Cruz were announced as the band's new rhythm section, rounding out the new lineup. This lineup would go on to play a few European shows and a small Latin American tour.

On 22 September 2019, the band issued a statement that guitarist Pav Cruz would not be joining them on their upcoming US tour due to "immigration issues", and that guitarist Joe Perez would be filling in. Pav released his own statement shortly after, clarifying that he was leaving the band permanently and that it was due to his own personal choice, and had nothing to do with any immigration issues.

The band released their fourth album, Katharsis, in October 2019, which features lead vocalist Archie Cruz, and producer Kane Churko on all instruments.

In mid-2020, Archie was accepted as a cast member/participant of the reality TV show Selviytyjät Suomi ("Survivor Finland") due to air in Finland in February 2021. After the filming of Selviytyjät Suomi, Archie has been writing and recording new music during October/November at Crehate Studios in Gothenburg, Sweden.

In January 2021, Archie Cruz announced the upcoming release of his new single, "Moonchild", and stated that he and Toxy were the only current official members of Santa Cruz. The single was released on 19 February 2021 on all major music platforms, with a music video being released on YouTube simultaneously. The same occurred on 9 April 2021, when a new release titled "Crossfire" was uploaded to all major music platforms, also with an accompanying music video on YouTube.

=== New lineup and The Return of the Kings (2022–2024) ===
On 31 January 2022, Archie announced the addition of guitarist Jerry Jade and drummer Randy McDemian. On 14 February 2022, the band announced the first single "Under the Gun" from their forthcoming album The Return of the Kings. On 21 February 2022, Tommy Bradley of the band Revelry Gang was announced as the new bassist.

On 6 April 2022, the band played their first show with the new lineup at the Whisky a Go Go in Los Angeles. The band was heavily criticized for the apparent reliance on and inability to stay in time with backing tracks. In response to this, the band stated, through social media, that they would not be using backing tracks going forward, starting with their next show in New York.

On 16 August 2022, the band played a sold out show at the Bowery Electric in New York City, this time with no backing tracks and a shortened setlist. On 25 August, Santa Cruz played an album release show at the Whisky a Go Go. However, three of their shows in early September were cancelled and Tommy Bradley confirmed on Instagram that he has left the band.

On 4 December 2022, the band played at Hell and Heaven Open Air in Mexico, featuring the return of guitarist Brody DeRozie, bassist Tommy Bradley, and new drummer Alex Mercado. In April 2023, the band played in Los Angeles with new drummer Wade Murff and bassist Luke Man.

=== Breakup and Archie Cruz solo career (2024–2025) ===
The band was scheduled to play at The Viper Room on January 24, 2024, but had to cancel 2 days before the show. As of February 2024, Archie Cruz is once again the only current member of the band, and will be going solo. Archie sparked further controversy on April 1, 2024, when he announced the original lineup's return as an April Fools joke on the band's social media

=== Possible Reunion (2025–present) ===
On June 18, 2025 a cryptic post teasing the return of the original lineup was posted, and quickly taken down from the band’s social media, leading fans to speculate that a reunion was in the works.

== Members ==
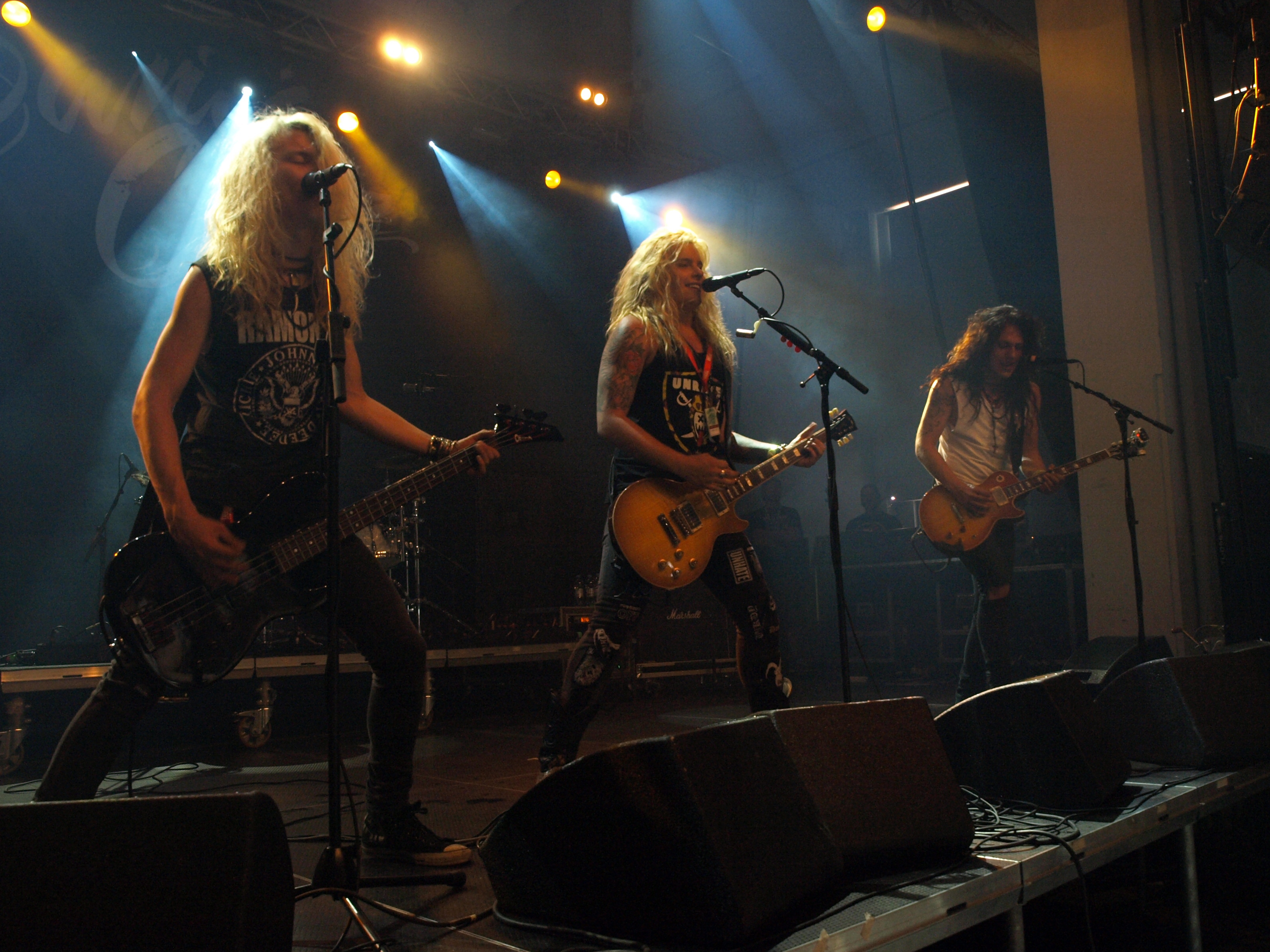
Santa Cruz in 2013

=== Former members ===
- Arttu "Archie Cruz" Kuosmanen – guitar, lead vocals (2007–2024)
- Joonas "Johnny Cruz" Parkkonen – guitar (2007–2018)
- Mitja "Middy Cruz" Toivonen – bass (2008–2018)
- Tapani "Taz Cruz" Fagerström – drums (2009–2018)
- Leo Stillman – drums (2007)
- Tomi Pulkkinen – drums (2008–2009)
- Jordan Marshall – drums (2018–2019)
- Pavel "Pav Cruz" Popov – guitar (2018–2019)
- Eemi "Ero Cruz" Lamberg – bass (2019–2020)
- Joe Perez – guitar (2019–2020)
- Toxy "Toxy Cruz" London – drums (2019–2022)
- Jerry "JJ Cruz" Jade – guitar (2022)
- Randy McDemian – drums (2022)
- Tommy Bradley – bass (2022, one off show; 2022)
- Alex Mercado – drums (2022–2023)
- Luke Man – bass (2023–2024)
- Brody DeRozie – guitar (2018, 2022–2024)
- Wade Murff – drums (2023–2024)

== Discography ==
=== Studio albums ===
- Screaming for Adrenaline (2013)
- Santa Cruz (2015)
- Bad Blood Rising (2017)
- Katharsis (2019)
- The Return of the Kings (2022)

=== Singles ===
- Relentless Renegades (2013)
- Nothing Compares to You (2013)
- We Are the Ones to Fall (2014)
- Wasted and Wounded (2014)
- My Remedy (2015)
- Skydiving Without a Parachute (2016)
- Drag Me Down (2016)
- River Phoenix (2017)
- Young Blood Rising (2017)
- Changing of Seasons (2019)
- Tell Me Why (2019)
- Into the War (2019)
- Testify (2019)
- Moonchild (2021)
- Crossfire (2021)
- Under the Gun (2022)
- Here Comes the Revolution (2022)
- Disarm Me (2022)
- ...And They Prayed On My Downfall (2023)
- Modern Day Madman (2024)

=== EPs ===
- Another Rush of Adrenaline (2009)
- Anthems for the Young 'n' Restless (2011)

=== Music videos ===
- Anthem for the Young 'n' Restless (2011)
- Aiming High (2013)
- Relentless Renegades (2013)
- Nothing Compares to You (2013)
- We Are the Ones to Fall (2014)
- Wasted 'n' Wounded (2014)
- My Remedy (2015)
- Let Them Burn (2015)
- Young Blood Rising (2017)
- Testify (2019)
- Moonchild (2021)
- Crossfire (2021)
- Under the Gun (2022)
- Here Comes the Revolution (2022)
- Disarm Me (2022)
- ...And They Prayed On My Downfall (2023)
