= Josephine Alhanko =

Swedish actress (born 1981)

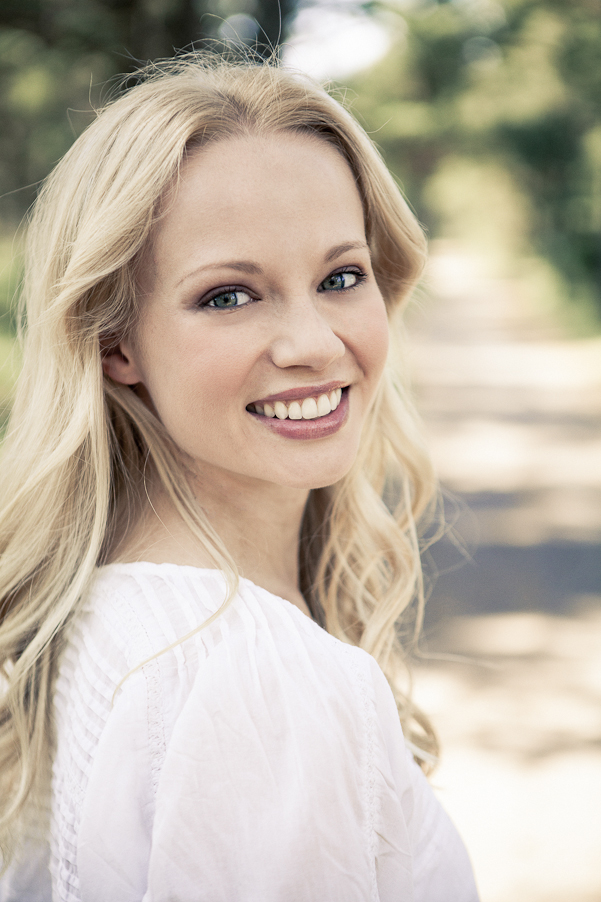
- Born: Josephine Alhanko; 24 April 1981 (age 45); Stockholm, Sweden
- Occupations: Actress, model
- Beauty pageant titleholder
- Title: Miss Sweden 2006
- Major competitions: Miss Sweden 2006 (Winner); Miss Universe 2006 (Top 20)

Josephine Elisabeth Larissa Alhanko (born 24 April 1981) is a Swedish actress and beauty pageant titleholder who won Miss Sweden 2006 and represented her country at Miss Universe 2006 where she placed Top 20. She is a niece of the ballet dancer, Anneli Alhanko.

Alhanko was Sweden's 28th semi-finalist at the Miss Universe 2006 pageant, held on 23 July in Los Angeles. She was the first Miss Sweden to place in nine years. Alhanko won Miss Sweden title in 2006, with the judges describing her as "professional, humble and sympathetic." At the Miss Universe pageant in 2006, Alhanko beat favorites including Erin McNaught of Australia. She has acted in various TV productions, movies and plays. She was also a student in the English National Ballet School (1997–98). She played Flash/Florence in the series Real Humans, which was broadcast on SVT and on Yle in Finland, and has since become an underground cult classic.

== Filmography ==
- 2002 – Dieselråttor och sjömansmöss
- 2002 – En av oss
- 2004 – Första intrycket
- 2005 – Världarnas bok
- 2012 – Irene Huss - Jagat vittne
- 2012 – Real Humans (Äkta människor): Flash/Florentine
