= Eric Young (rugby union) =

- Born: Thomas Eric Boswell Young; 6 February 1891 Hartlepool, England
- Died: 12 March 1973 (aged 82)

Rugby union career
- Position: Centre
Amateur team(s)
| Years | Team | Apps | (Points) |
- Hartlepool Rovers
- Durham University
Provincial / State sides
| Years | Team | Apps | (Points) |
- Durham County
| 1912 | Whites Trial | | |
International career
| Years | Team | Apps | (Points) |
| 1911 | Scotland | 1 | (0) |

Sir Eric Young MInstME, MICE (6 February 1891 – 12 March 1973) was a Scotland international rugby union player. He played as a Centre. He was later knighted for his mining career.

== Rugby union career ==
=== Amateur career ===
He went to Loretto School, and then went to Durham University. He played rugby for Durham University and Hartlepool Rovers.

=== Provincial career ===
Until his selection for Scotland, Young turned out for Durham County.

He played for Whites Trial side on 6 January 1912.

=== International career ===
The Edinburgh Evening News of 30 December 1910 noted that Young was 'big, strong and tremendously fast' and stated: 'Though associated as a senior with Durham County, Young is of Scottish parentage – and he was in the Loretto team which won the schools championship the other year.'

He was capped once for Scotland in 1911.

== Military career ==
In the First World War, he served with the 3rd Yorkshire Regiment as a Lieutenant and saw action in France.

== Mining career ==
He went into the mining industry, first as a mining engineer, at various sites around England, and then became Managing Director of Bolsover Colliery. He was one of the two original production members of the National Coal Board.

He was awarded a knighthood in the 1949 New Year Honours.

He was to quit the National Coal Board in 1950 after a spat with Philip Noel-Baker, the Minister of Fuel and Power. The Bradford Observer of 5 December 1950 noted:

I understand that the main difference of opinion of Sir Eric Young, the [National Coal] Board, and the Minister is over the question of centralisation. Sir Eric has been an exponent of more de-centralisation for the coal industry and has continually pressed his views on the matter.

The Surrey Mirror of 8 December 1950 noted:

Regarded as the country’s leading expert on coal production, he has been consistent in his expressed view that one of the solutions to the industry’s problems is harder work by the miners – a view that has not altogether endeared him to the miners and their trade union leaders.

The Northampton Chronicle and Echo of Tuesday 12 December 1950 headlines 'Intemperate language by Sir Eric Young' and notes that Philip Noel-Baker had decided to sack Young on 23 November and informed him then that he would not be re-appointed to the National Coal Board. On asking Sir Young for a statement, he said: 'There seems to be a conflict of opinion on what was said and done. The public may form their own judgement.'

== Family ==
He was the second son of Dr. Moffat Young (1866–1918) of West Hartlepool, originally of Derry; and Dorothea Dunn Morison (1856–1944) of Durham.

His grandmother Dorothy Rutherford (1824–1894) was from Midlothian.

He married Margaret Mary Hayward in 1928, a daughter of Rev. A. E. Hayward.
