= ProCivitas Private Gymnasium =

Swedish upper secondary school

- Helsingborg, Karlberg, Lund, Malmö, Stockholm, Uppsala, Växjö

Information
- Type: High school
- Motto: Work hard, be nice, dream big
- Established: 1997
- Enrollment: 2 930 (2022)
- Colors: Red and blue

ProCivitas Private Gymnasium (Swedish: ProCivitas Privata Gymnasium) is a group

of independent for-profit Swedish upper secondary schools, with subsidiaries in six Swedish cities. The schools in Helsingborg and Malmöhave among the highest enrolment points among all Sweden's upper secondary schools. The school was founded by Gustaf Wiklund and Jonas Abelsson and is today owned and operated by AcadeMedia, a publicly traded school conglomerate.

== Courses ==
- Helsingborg: Studies of economy, society, and natural science.
- Malmö: Studies of society, economy, sports focus, and natural science.
- Växjö: Studies of society, sports focus, and natural science.
- Lund: Studies of society, economy, and natural science.
- Stockholm: Studies of Society, Economics, and Economics combined with law.
- Stockholm Karlberg: Studies of Society and Natural science.
- Uppsala: Studies of society, economy, and natural science.
