= Reckless Love (Reckless Love album) =

Studio album by Reckless Love
- Released: 10 February 2010
- Recorded: Summer 2009
- Studio: Hip Studios, Helsinki
- Genre: Glam metal, heavy metal, hard rock
- Length: 40:44
- Label: Spinefarm
- Producer: Ilkka Wirtanen

Reckless Love chronology
Reckless Love (2010)	Animal Attraction (2011)

Reckless Love is the debut, self-titled album from Finnish glam metal band Reckless Love.

The album was released on 10 February 2010 on Spinefarm Records and entered the Finnish National Charts at number 13. The album was produced by Ilkka Wirtanen in the summer of 2009 at Hip Studios in Helsinki. The band re-released the album on 19 December 2010 with the subtitle "Cool Edition" which contained bonus tracks previously available only on the Japanese release and as single B-sides.

== Reception ==
The album has received positive reviews from critics. William Clark of Guitar International wrote, "Reckless Love are just what glam metal fans across the globe have been waiting for: a band with a fresh sound, a standout lead vocalist, and some vivid retro ’80s influences".

== Track listing ==
No.	Title	Length
1.	"Feel My Heat"	3:46
2.	"One More Time"	3:36
3.	"Badass"	4:04
4.	"Love Machine"	3:44
5.	"Beautiful Bomb"	3:12
6.	"Romance"	3:16
7.	"Sex"	4:02
8.	"Back to Paradise"	3:56
9.	"So Yeah!"	3:26
10.	"Wild Touch"	4:08
11.	"Born to Rock"	3:29

Cool Edition bonus tracks
No.	Title	Length
12.	"Get Electric"	3:35
13.	"Back to Paradise" (acoustic version)	3:29
14.	"Hysteria" (Def Leppard cover; acoustic version)	4:34
15.	"Sex" (acoustic version)	3:45
16.	"Back to Paradise" (remix)	4:21

Japan bonus track
No.	Title	Length
12.	"Get Electric"	3:35
13.	"Back to Paradise" (remix)	4:21

Bonus tracks
12	Get Electric	Cool Edition/Japanese edition
13	Back to Paradise (acoustic version)	Cool Edition
14	Hysteria [Def Leppard cover] (acoustic version)	Cool Edition
15	Sex (acoustic version)	Cool Edition
16	Back to Paradise (remix)	Cool Edition/Japanese edition

== Personnel ==
- Olli Herman – lead vocals
- Pepe Salohalme – guitar
- Hessu Maxx – drums
- Jalle Verne – bass

== Singles ==
- One More Time
- Beautiful Bomb
- Romance
- Badass [UK release]
- Romance [UK release]
- Back to Paradise
