= Eric Young (footballer, born 1952) =

English footballer

Personal information
- Full name: Eric Royston Young
- Date of birth: 26 November 1952 (age 73)
- Place of birth: Stockton-on-Tees, England
- Position: Midfielder

Senior career*
| Years | Team | Apps | (Gls) |
| 1969–1974 | Manchester United | 0 | (0) |
| 1972–1973 | → Peterborough United (loan) | 25 | (2) |
| 1973–1974 | → Walsall (loan) | 8 | (0) |
| 1973–1974 | → Stockport County (loan) | 16 | (0) |
| 1974–1978 | Darlington | 130 | (15) |
| | Whitby Town | ? | (?) |

International career
| 1968 | England Schoolboys | 6 | (1) |
| 1971 | England Youth | 1 | (0) |
- * Club domestic league appearances and goals

Eric Royston Young (born 26 November 1952) is an English former professional footballer who played in the Football League, as a midfielder.
