= Reckless Love =

Finnish rock band

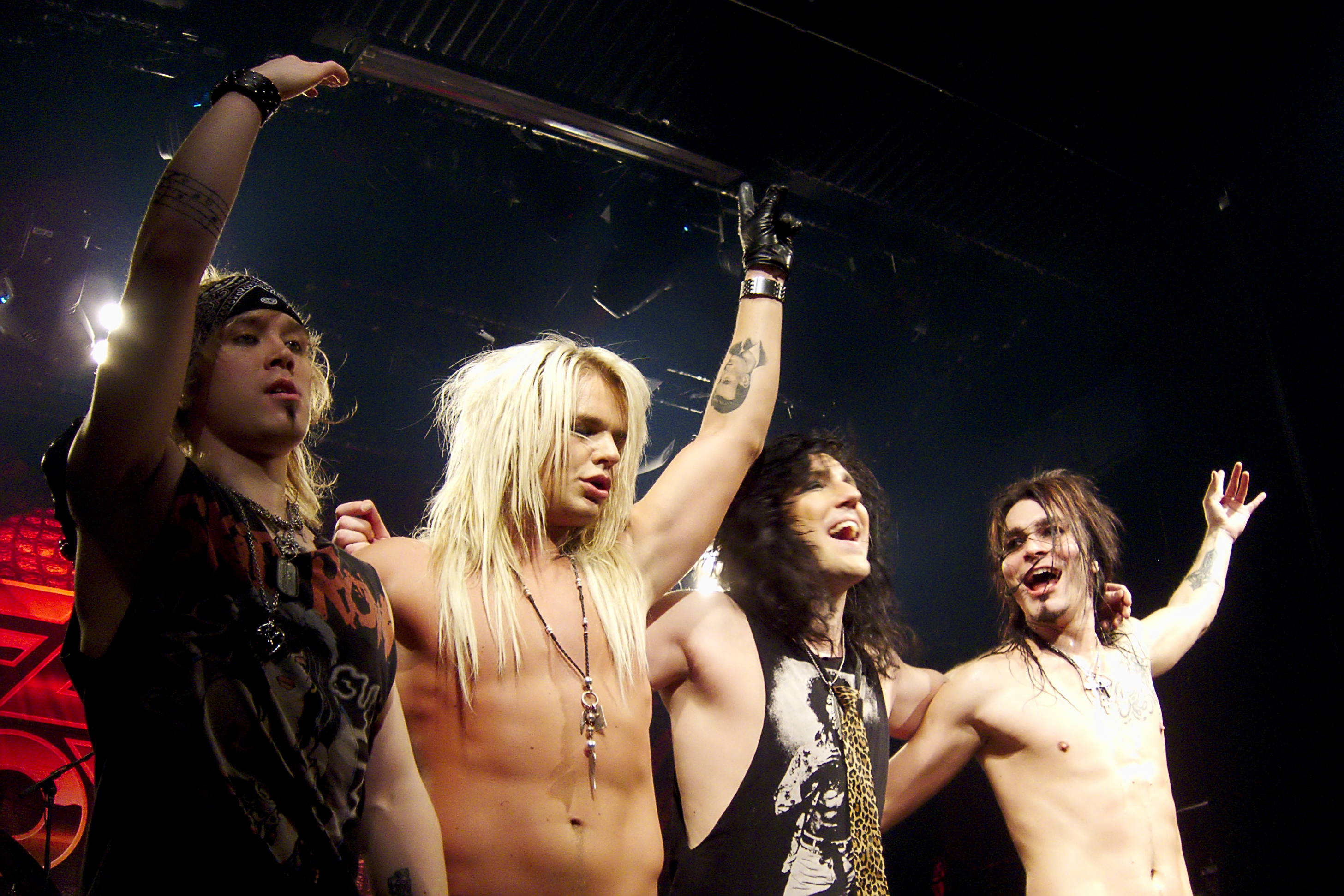
- Reckless Love live in 2012 at Tavastia Klubi in Helsinki. From left to right: Jalle Verne, Olli Herman, Pepe Reckless and Hessu Maxx.

Background information
- Also known as: Reckless Life (early)
- Origin: Kuopio, Finland
- Genres: Glam metal; hard rock
- Years active: 2001–2024 (on hiatus)
- Label: Universal Music Finland
- Members: Olli Herman; Pepe Reckless; Jalle Verne
- Past members: Hessu Maxx; Mike Harley; Zam Ryder
- Website: Reckless Love on Facebook

Reckless Love is a Finnish rock band formed in Kuopio in 2001. They released their debut album in 2010, which reached number 13 in the Finnish charts. In 2011, they released their second album, Animal Attraction, which was in the top 10 of the Finnish charts. After the success of Animal Attraction, Reckless Love released their third album, Spirit, in 2013, which contained the two singles "Night on Fire" and "So Happy I Could Die". The 2016 album, InVader, (containing Keep It Up All Night and Monster) was released on 4 March 2016, on the opening night of their European tour with Santa Cruz. Their newest album, Turborider, was released on March 25, 2022. It contains a strong modern synthwave sound which is heard in featured songs; "Eyes of a Maniac" and "Future Lover Boy".

== Career ==
The band started their career with the name Reckless Life, under which they initially played covers of Guns N' Roses. Having had no success with this approach, they began to write their own songs, and won the Kuopio Band Competition in 2004. As part of the Kuopio Popcity Project 2005, Reckless Love, along with Rainbow Crash, Svat and Sideshow Zombies went on a Scandinavian tour, visiting Sweden, Norway and Denmark.

2007 saw Olli Herman (also known as H. Oliver Twisted) cover as the singer for the Swedish band Crashdïet, as their singer (Dave Lepard) committed suicide in January 2006. One and a half years later, Olli Herman returned to Reckless Love. In January 2009, the website of Reckless Love announced that drummer Mike Harley would leave the band. Hardly a week later a replacement was found: Hessu Maxx.

On 23 April 2009, a record deal with Universal Music was made. In July 2009, Reckless Love released their first single, "One More Time". In August, they reached number No. 2 in the YleX radio station's charts in Finland. The second single, "Beautiful Bomb", released on 15 October 2009, reached No. 4. The band also shot a music video for this single, which premiered on MTV in December 2009. On 20 February 2010 the third single and second music video, Romance, was released. Four days later the debut album, Reckless Love, was released. This album was available in the Baltic States, Belgium and the UK, as well as in Finland. The Japanese version was released in July 2010. A release into the German and Swedish markets is still under discussion. The album debuted at number No. 13 in Finland's official charts.

The band released their follow-up album, Animal Attraction, on 5 October 2011. The first single "Hot" was released on 18 April 2011 and the single "Animal Attraction" was released on 12 September 2011.

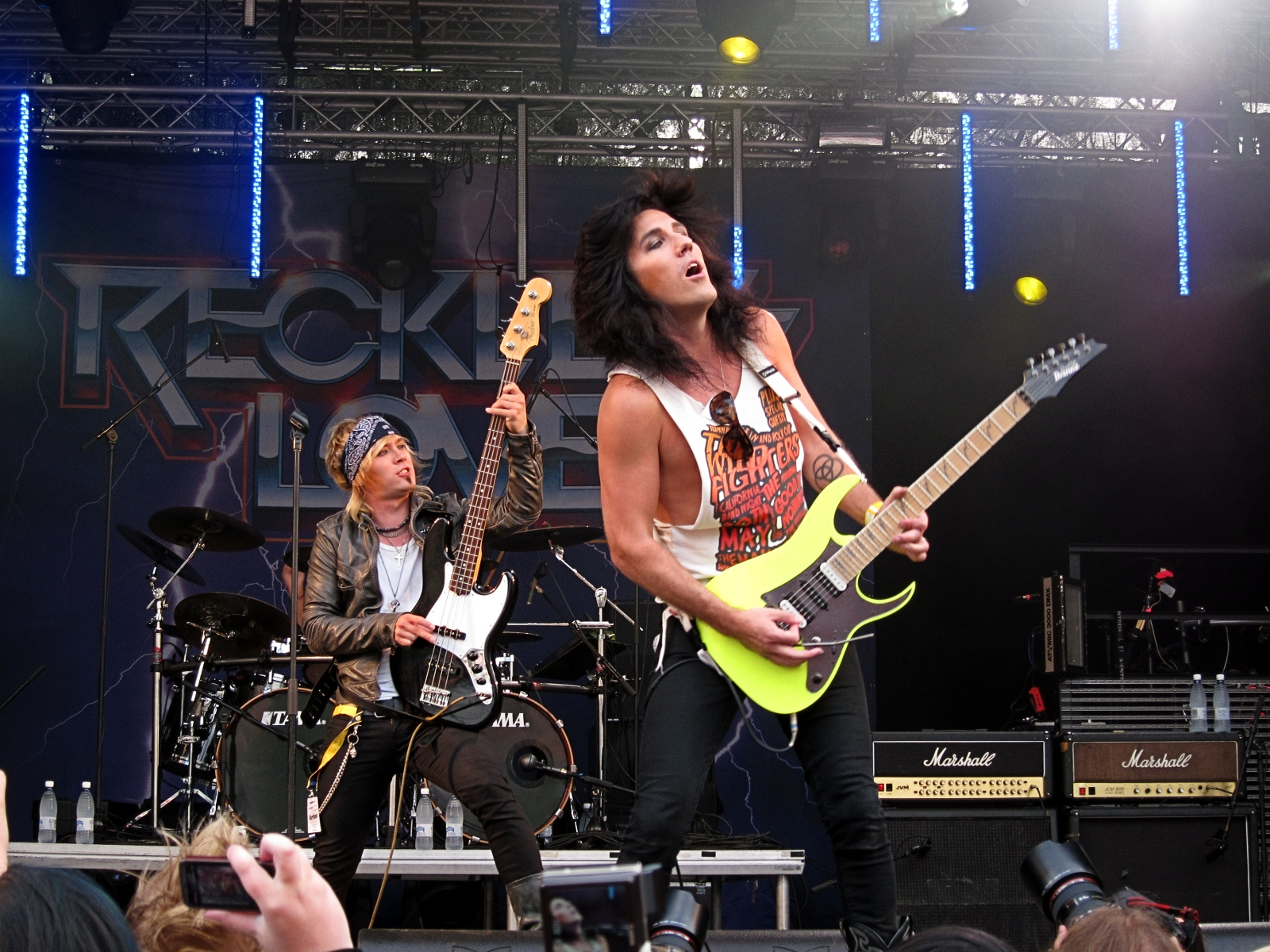
The band at Tammerfest 2011 in Finland

The "Animal Attraction Tour" kicked off on 7 October 2011 including a four-night residency in London. The video for "On the Radio", which is the tenth track of their Animal Attraction album, was filmed in Los Angeles, California.

As of 26 April 2013, the first single from the third album Spirit, "Night on Fire", was released, along with the music video to support the song. The album was finally released on 2 September 2013, with a second single and corresponding video "So Happy I Could Die" preceding it on 25 August 2013. The band then embarked on a nine-date headlining UK tour in October 2013 that included venues in Manchester, Newcastle, Glasgow, Leeds, Nottingham, Wolverhampton, Norwich, Bristol and at the O2 Academy in London.

The vocalist of the band Olli Herman has appeared in "Local band" lineup with Alexi Laiho (of Children of Bodom), Archie Kuosmanen (of Santa Cruz) and Jussi 69 (of The 69 Eyes).

In 2022, the band’s song “Monster” was featured in Season 1, Episode 6 of the TV series Peacemaker.

In January 2024, Hessu Maxx left the band. The band simultaneously announced a hiatus, due to Herman dedicating time to focus on their new role in the band Popeda.

== Discography ==
=== Albums ===
Year	Album	Peak positions	
Year	Album	FIN	SWI
2010	Reckless Love	13	—
2011	Animal Attraction	10	—
2013	Spirit	3	—
2016	InVader	8	—
2022	Turborider	3	84

=== Singles ===
Year	Single	Peak positions	Album
Year	Single	FIN	Album
2004	"So Yeah!"	—	Non-album single
2005	"TKO"	—	Non-album single
2005	"Light But Heavy"	—	Non-album single
2006	"Speed Princess"	—	Non-album single
2009	"One More Time"	—	Reckless Love
2009	"Beautiful Bomb"	—	Reckless Love
2010	"Romance"	—	Reckless Love
2010	"Badass"	—	Reckless Love
2010	"Get Electric"	—	Reckless Love
2010	"Romance"	—	Reckless Love
2010	"Back to Paradise"	—	Reckless Love
2011	"Hot"	18	Animal Attraction
2011	"Animal Attraction"	—	Animal Attraction
2011	"On the Radio"	—	Animal Attraction
2013	"Night on Fire"	—	Spirit
2013	"So Happy I Could Die"	—	Spirit
2015	"Keep It Up All Night"	—	Non-album single
2016	"Monster"	—	inVader
2020	"Loaded"	—	Non-album single
2021	"Outrun"	—	Turborider
2021	"Eyes of a Maniac"	—	Turborider
2022	"Turborider"	—	Turborider
2022	"Bark at the Moon"	—	Turborider
