= Azra Duliman =

- Born: February 14, 1986 (age 39)
- Occupation: beauty pageant contestant

Azra Duliman (born 14 February 1986) was the 2009 Miss Sweden winner. She came to Sweden as a 7 year old from Bosnia and Herzegovina. Duliman is currently studying law in Stockholm. Azra Duliman will not participate in Miss Universe or any other beauty pageant since Miss Sweden lost its license rights to crown such a winner. Duliman has also told press that she wasn't interested in representing Sweden at Miss Universe 2009 anyway, and that she felt that beauty pageants are exploiting women in a bad way.
