= Rest in Sleaze =

Studio album by Crashdïet
- Released: 20 May 2005
- Recorded: 2004–2005
- Genre: Glam metal; hard rock
- Length: 35:34
- Label: Universal; Stockholm
- Producer: Platform, Grizzly/Tysper

Crashdïet chronology
Crashdïet (2003)	Rest in Sleaze (2005)	The Unattractive Revolution (2007)

Singles from Rest in Sleaze
- 1. "Riot in Everyone" Released: 14 February 2005; 2. "Knokk 'Em Down" Released: 23 May 2005; 3. "Breakin' the Chainz" Released: 15 August 2005; 4. "It's a Miracle" Released: 14 November 2005

Rest in Sleaze is the debut album by Swedish rock band Crashdïet. The album was produced by Platform (Chris Laney and Anders Ringman) and Grizzly/Tysper (Gustav Jonsson and Tommy Tysper). The album debuted at #12 on the Swedish album chart. The band released four singles from the album; "Riot in Everyone", "Knokk 'Em Down", "Breakin' the Chainz", and "It's a Miracle".

It is the first and only album that features late singer Dave Lepard, who committed suicide in 2006.

== Track listing ==
Rest in Sleaze track listing
No.	Title	Lyrics	Music	Length
1.	"Knokk 'Em Down"	Dave Lepard	Lepard	3:36
2.	"Riot in Everyone"	Lepard	Martin Sweet; Lepard	3:57
3.	"Queen Obscene/69 Shots"	Lepard	Lepard	3:45
4.	"Breakin' the Chainz"	Lepard	Sweet; Lepard	3:01
5.	"Needle in Your Eye"	Lepard	Sweet; Lepard	3:48
6.	"Tikket"	Lepard	Lepard	3:33
7.	"Out of Line"	Lepard	Lepard	3:42
8.	"It's a Miracle"	Lepard	Sweet; Lepard	3:29
9.	"Straight Outta Hell"	Lepard	Sweet; Lepard	2:59
10.	"Back on Trakk"	Lepard	Sweet; Lepard	3:40
Total length:				35:34

Japanese version
No.	Title	Lyrics	Music	Length
11.	"Tomorrow" (Demo)	Lepard	Lepard	4:10
12.	"Riot in Everyone" (Demo)	Lepard	Sweet; Lepard	4:11
13.	"Riot in Everyone" (Video)	Lepard	Sweet; Lepard	3:56
14.	"Private Shit" (Exclusive Video Footage)			9:06

== Personnel ==
- Dave Lepard – vocals, guitar
- Martin Sweet – guitar, backing vocals
- Peter London – bass, backing vocals
- Eric Young – drums, backing vocals

== Charts ==
=== Album ===
Chart (2005)	Peak position
Swedish Albums (Sverigetopplistan)	12

=== Singles ===
Title	Year	Peak chart positions
Title	Year	SWE
"Riot in Everyone"	2005	33
"Knokk' Em Down"	2005	57
"Breakin the Chainz"	2005	47
"It's a Miracle"	2005	—
