= The Unattractive Revolution =

Studio album by Crashdïet
- Released: 3 October 2007
- Recorded: 2007
- Genre: Glam metal, hard rock
- Length: 43:58
- Label: Universal Music

Crashdïet chronology
Rest in Sleaze (2005)	The Unattractive Revolution (2007)	Generation Wild (2010)

Singles from The Unattractive Revolution
- 1. "In the Raw" Released: 5 September 2007; 2. "Falling Rain" Released: 23 February 2008

The Unattractive Revolution
Review scores
Source	Rating
Metal Express Radio	9/10

The Unattractive Revolution is the second studio album by Swedish rock band Crashdïet. Released on 3 October 2007, it debuted at #11 on the Swedish album charts. It was the first and only album to feature vocalist H. Olliver Twisted following the death of Dave Lepard.

== Track listing ==
No.	Title	Writer(s)	Length
1.	"In the Raw"	Sweet, Twisted	3:46
2.	"Like a Sin"	Sweet, Twisted	2:55
3.	"Falling Rain"	Sweet, Roxie	4:46
4.	"I Don't Care" (featuring Mick Mars)	Sweet, Twisted, Mars, Ramström, Magnusson	4:01
5.	"Die Another Day"	Sweet, London, Twisted	4:24
6.	"Alone" (featuring Mick Mars)	Sweet, Twisted, Young, Mars, Ramström, Magnusson	3:47
7.	"Thrill Me"	Sweet, Twisted	4:45
8.	"Overnight"	Sweet, Young	4:04
9.	"XTC Overdrive"	Sweet, Twisted, Magnus	4:02
10.	"Bound to be Enslaved"	Sweet, Twisted, Nirbrant	3:34
11.	"The Buried Song"	Sweet, London, Twisted	3:49
12.	"Out Of The Cold (2017 vinyl bonus track)"	Sweet, Twisted	3:54

== Personnel ==
- H. Olliver Twisted – vocals
- Martin Sweet – guitar
- Peter London – bass
- Eric Young – drums

=== Additional musicians ===
- Mick Mars – lead guitar on tracks "I Don't Care" and "Alone"

== Charts ==
=== Album ===
Chart (2007)	Peak position
Sweden	11

=== Singles ===
Year	Title	Chart	Peak position
2007	"In the Raw"	Sweden	35
2008	"Falling Rain"	Sweden	—
