= Peter London =

Swedish bassist (born 1982)

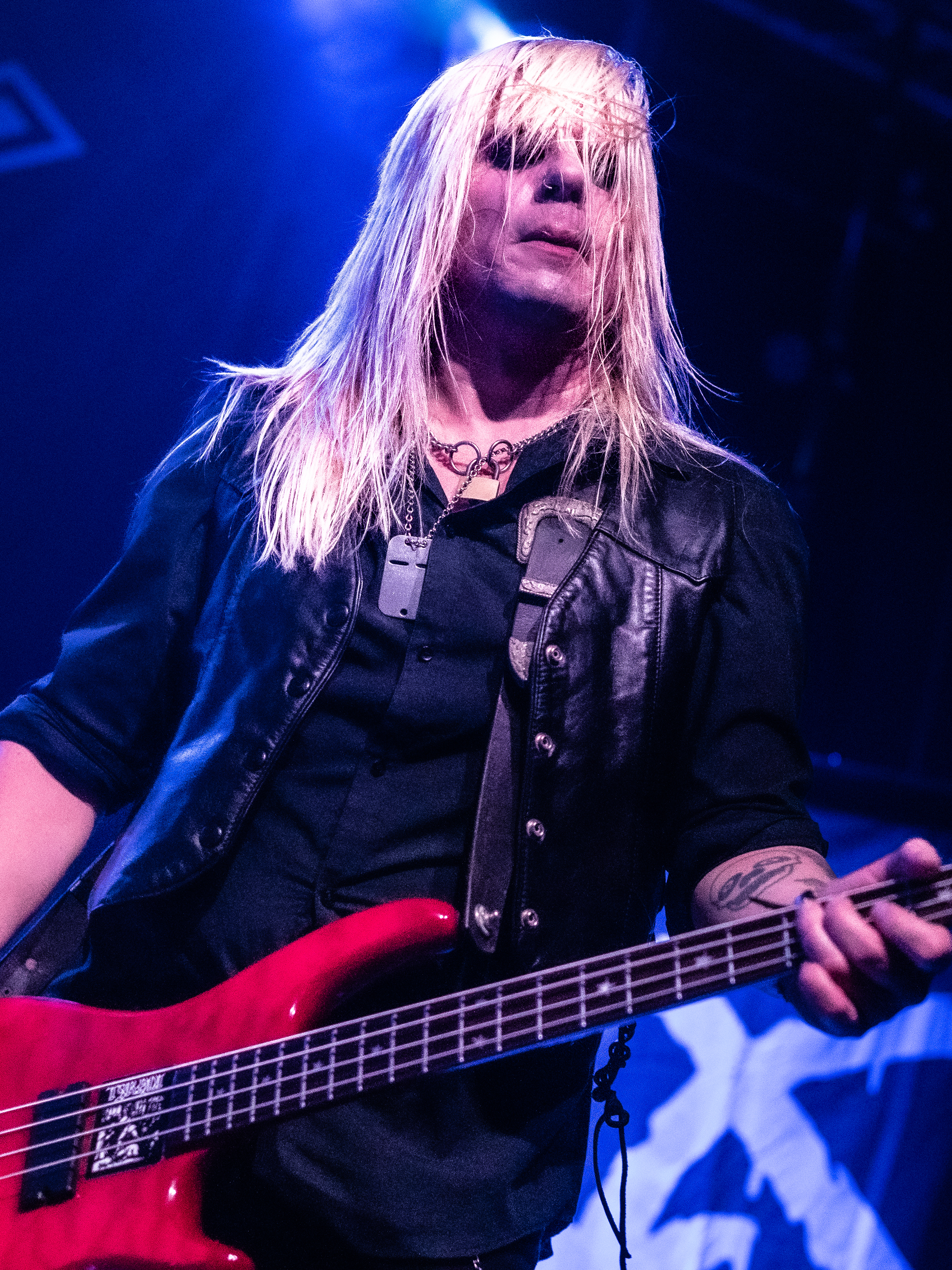

Background information
- Born: Peter Lunden; 28 September 1982 (age 43)
- Origin: Sweden
- Genres: Hard rock, glam metal, könsrock (Genital Rock), pop viking rock, punk rock
- Occupations: Musician, bassist
- Instruments: bass, vocals, guitar
- Years active: 2000–present
- Labels: Universal Music
- Website: www.crashdiet.org

Peter London (born Peter Lunden; 28 September 1982 in Sweden) is a Swedish bassist. He is best known as the bassist for the Swedish sleaze band Crashdïet, but he also performs as a one-man band, Alter Egon. As Alter Egon, London plays all the instruments himself and sings in Swedish. The songs are mostly about himself and sexual freedom. Since 2015, London has been the bass-player of pop rock right-wing-band Bedårande Barn.

London married Swedish model and former Miss Sweden title-holder Isabel Lestapier Winqvist on 25 June 2010 at the Hedvig Eleonora Church in Stockholm. They were divorced in March 2012. In 2023, Swedish media reported that he was in a relationship with the Swedish media commentator and politician, Louise Erixon.

== Discography ==
=== With Crashdïet ===
- Rest in Sleaze (2005)
- The Unattractive Revolution (2007)
- Generation Wild (2010)
- Savage Playground (2013)
- Rust (2019)
- Automaton (2022)

=== With Alter Egon ===
- Alteraktiva Romanser (2008)

=== With Paradice ===
- Pain And Pleasure (2002)

=== With Bedårande Barn ===
- Back To Life - A Tribute To Goodbye To Gravity (Compilation, 2016)
- För Framtids Segrar - Live i Helsingborg (Live album, 2017)
- Karaoke (Digital album, 2017)
- Election Day 18 (Next Chapter) (Digital Album, 2018)
- Allt Vi Vill Ha (Digital-Singel, 2018)
- Stängda Dörrar (Digital-Singel, 2018)
- Live i Sölvesborg (Digital-Album, 2018)
