= Crashdïet =

Swedish rock band

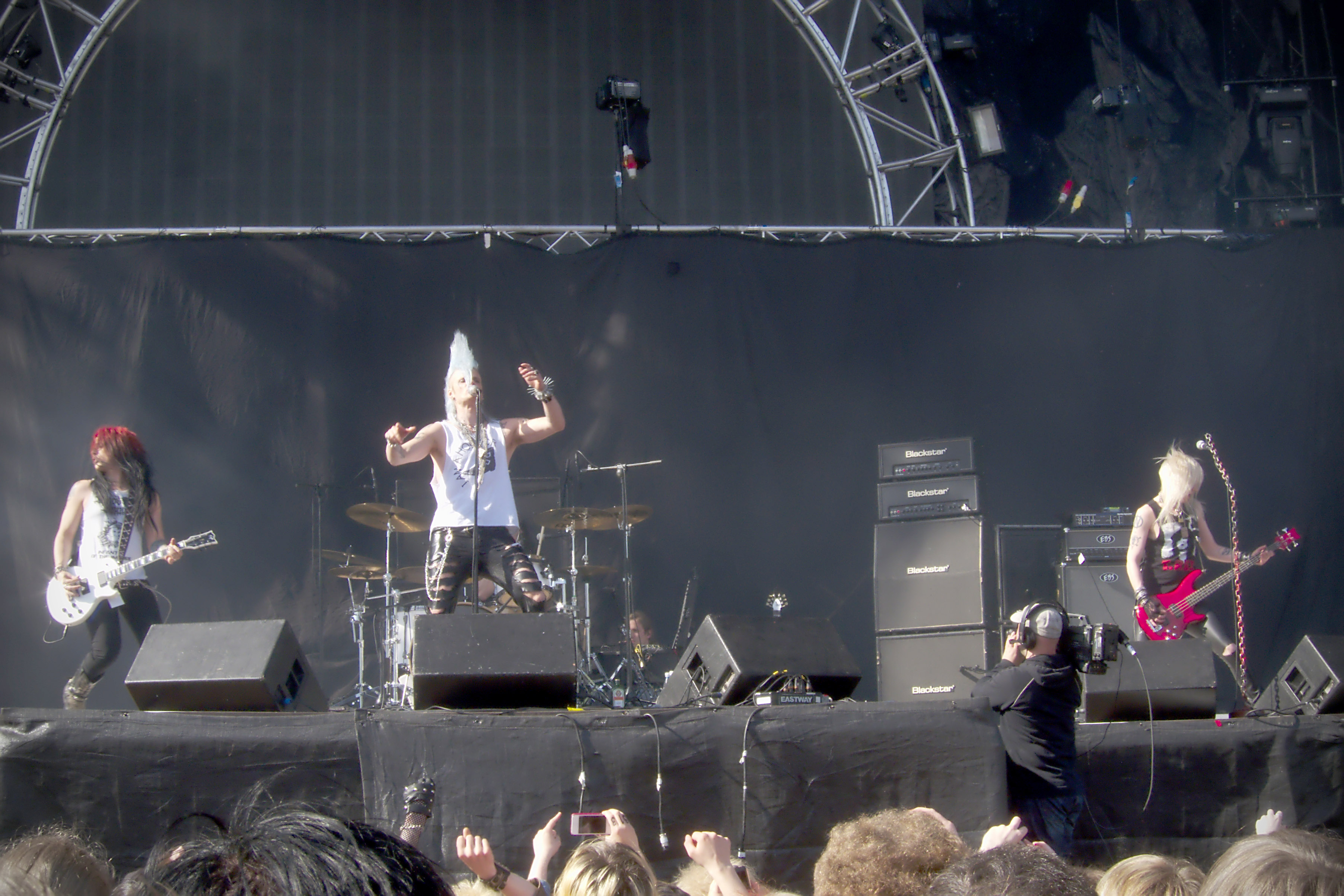
- Crashdïet at Kaisaniemenpuisto 2012 in Finland

Background information
- Origin: Stockholm, Sweden
- Genres: Sleaze rock; glam metal; hard rock
- Years active: 2000–2002; 2002–2006; 2007–present
- Labels: Universal; StandBy
- Members: John Elliot; Martin Sweet; Chris Young; Michael Sweet
- Past members: Dave Lepard; Eric Young; Peter London; Gabriel Keyes; H. Olliver Twisted; Simon Cruz; Mary Goore; Lacu; (see Personnel section for others)
- Website: crashdiet.org

Crashdïet (often stylised as CRASHDÏET) is a Swedish sleaze rock/glam metal band formed in Stockholm in 2000. The group consists of Martin Sweet, Peter London, Michael Sweet and John Elliot. They have released six albums: 2005's Rest in Sleaze, 2007's The Unattractive Revolution, 2010's Generation Wild, 2013's The Savage Playground, 2019's Rust, and 2022's Automaton. The band is named after an unreleased Guns N' Roses song.

== History ==
=== 2000–2005: Formation and early years ===
The band was originally formed in 2000 and built up a cult following with the release of their first demos, several of which were released on their official website via download. However, in late 2002, the band split up, with former members joining Repugnant and SubVision. Vocalist Dave Lepard then reformed the band with members from the current lineup, guitar player Martin Sweet and bassist Peter London were announced on the band's website on Christmas Day along with a call for drummers. In April 2003 Eric Young was announced as the band's new drummer. In 2003 Crashdïet released their first self-titled EP, and in 2004 they were signed to Universal Records.

=== 2005–2006: Rest in Sleaze and Lepard's suicide ===
In 2005, the band released their debut album, Rest in Sleaze, and they embarked on a Swedish tour in the fall of 2005 to support the album. The album did well overall (debuted at No. 12 on the Swedish album chart) although they were not especially famous outside of Sweden. The band also played at Download Festival in the United Kingdom in 2005, to support the album. The album debuted at No. 12 on the Swedish album chart and Four singles were produced from that album, including "Riot in Everyone", "Breakin' the Chainz", "Knokk 'Em Down" and "It's a Miracle".

On 13 January 2006, vocalist Dave Lepard died by suicide at the age of 25, after a bout of depression during which he hid from family and friends. After the death of Lepard, the band decided to end the band and said in an official statement that:

Crashdïet will definitely not continue as a band. The band consisted of four people and now one of them has left us.

Several months later, on 2 April, they decided to start the band up again after getting support from the Lepard family and fans all over the world, they announced the following statement via their website:

We feel that we want to carry on the Crashdïet legacy, which will keep Dave's spirit alive for a long long time... It would be a shame NOT to spread the message across the whole world and let them know what real music should sound like!

=== 2007–2008: New singer and The Unattractive Revolution ===
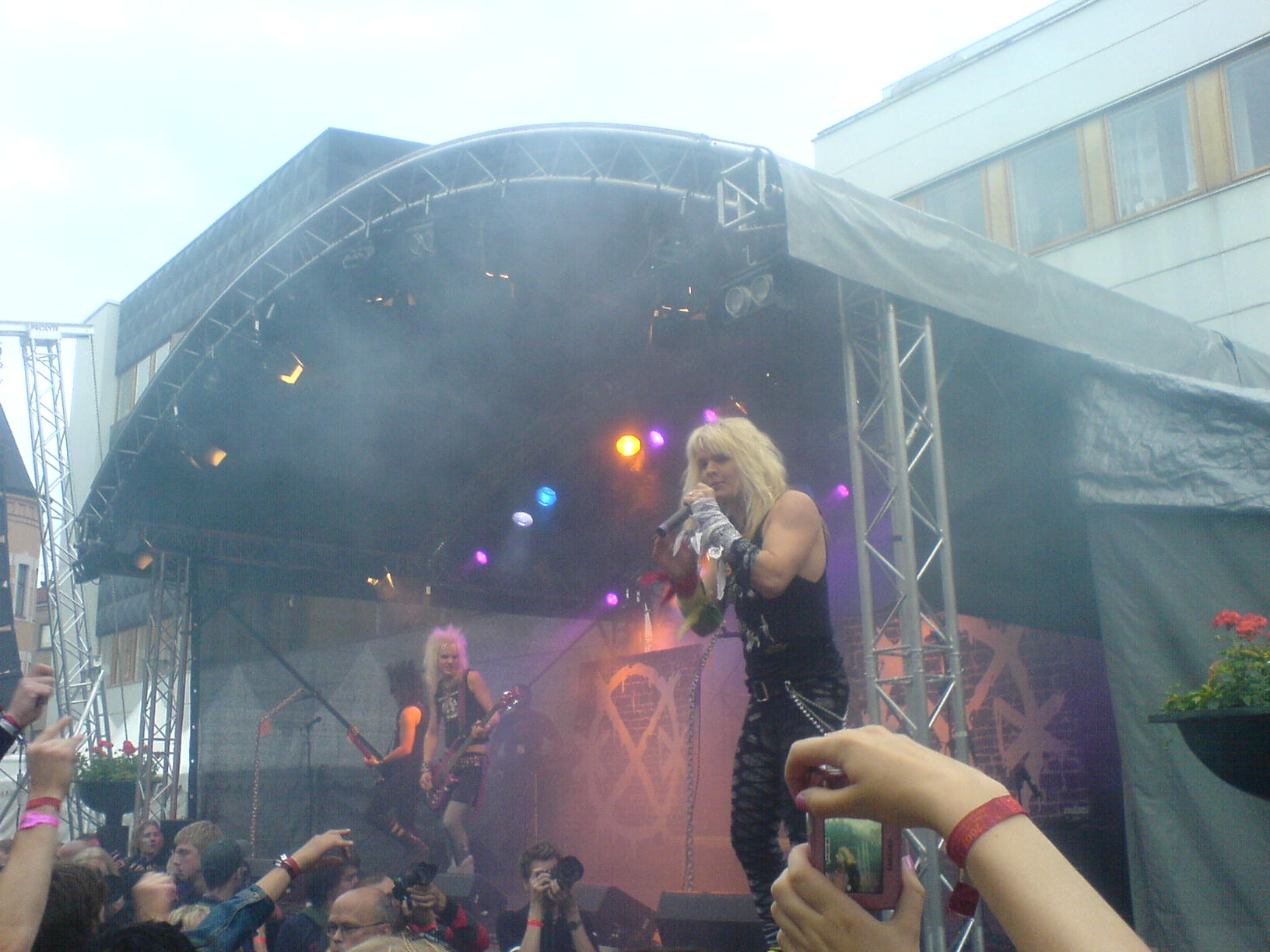
Crashdïet performing in 2007

On 22 January 2007 the band announced the addition of a new vocalist, H. Olliver Twisted from Finland (also playing in the band Reckless Love). They officially released their entire debut live performance (on the Rest in Sleaze Festival in February) with Olliver via their website as a free download. Later in the year, the band also announced plans for the album The Unattractive Revolution, and a single, "In the Raw". The album was released on 3 October 2007 and debuted at No. 11 on the Swedish album chart.

In November–December 2007 and February–April 2008, Crashdïet toured as opening act for Hardcore Superstar and on 23 February, the band announced via their official website that the second single from their new album would be "Falling Rain" On 13 July 2008 it was announced via the band's official website that H. Olliver Twisted had come to an agreement with the band to go their separate ways. In 2009 the band announced their new lead singer, Simon Cruz and played their first show with him on the Sweden Rock Cruise in October.

=== 2010–2017: Generation Wild and recent events ===
On 14 April 2010, the band released Generation Wild, their first album with their new singer, Simon Cruz, and it debuted at No. 3 on the Swedish Album Chart. The title track was released as the first single on 28 February 2010, and its music video was banned by MTV due to obscene images. In September they were the opening act for Ozzy Osbourne in Globen, Sweden, and in October, the band played in front of 50,000 people at the SWU Festival in Brazil.

"Chemical", the second single from Generation Wild, was released on 19 September. On 24 March 2011, Crashdïet launched the European "Dark Decadence Tour" with Hardcore Superstar and the 69 Eyes that ended on April. 16 Only a couple days later, they played a UK tour with Houston as co-headliners. On 4 June, the band announced on their website that they will film their Sweden Rock Festival show on 8 June for an upcoming DVD.

Generation Wild was released on vinyl on 2 November. This version also featured a bonus track called "Hollywood Teaze".

The band released their fourth album, The Savage Playground, on 22 January 2013. The first single, "Cocaine Cowboys", was released on 14 December 2012.

Singer Simon Cruz left the band in the middle of their 2015 Japan tour. Gabriel Keyes was announced as the new lead singer in December 2017, with the single "We Are The Legion" to follow later that month. Another single, "Reptile", was released on 1 January 2019.

=== 2019–present: Rust and Automaton ===
Crashdïet released their new full length studio record, Rust, with new singer, Gabriel Keyes, on 13 September 2019 via Frontiers music srl and also released the third single from the album, "In the Maze", on 5 August 2019.

In April 2022, the band announced their new album Automaton would be released later that month on 29 April. The band also announced that drummer Eric Young would be stepping down indefinitely from live duties in the band for an undetermined time period and is being replaced by Lacu for all upcoming tours booked in 2022.

In February 2023, also bassist Peter London announced to take a break from live duties, due to a burnout. London returned to live shows in 2024.

== Personnel ==
Current members

- John Elliot – lead vocals (2024–present)
- Martin Sweet – lead guitar, backing vocals (2002–2006, 2006–present); rhythm guitar (2006–2007, 2015–present)
- Chris Young – bass, backing vocals (2025–present)
- Michael Sweet – drums (2024-present; 2011, 2023 touring)

Former members

- Mary Goore – lead guitar (2000–2002)
- Mace Kelly – bass (2000–2002)
- Tom Bones – drums (2000–2002)
- Dave Lepard – lead vocals, rhythm guitar (2000–2002, 2002–2006) (died 2006)
- Eric Young – drums, backing vocals (2003–2006, 2006–2022)
- Peter London – bass, backing vocals (2002–2006, 2006–2025; hiatus in 2023)
- H. Olliver Twisted – lead vocals (2007–2008)
- Simon Cruz – lead vocals, rhythm guitar (2009–2015)
- Gabriel Keyes – lead vocals (2017–2024)

Former touring musicians

- Lacu – drums (2022)
- Sam Söderlindh – bass, backing vocals (2023)

Timeline

== Discography ==
- Rest in Sleaze (2005)
- The Unattractive Revolution (2007)
- Generation Wild (2010)
- The Savage Playground (2013)
- Rust (2019)
- Automaton (2022)
- Art of Chaos (2026)
