= H. Olliver Twisted =

Finnish singer (born 1983)

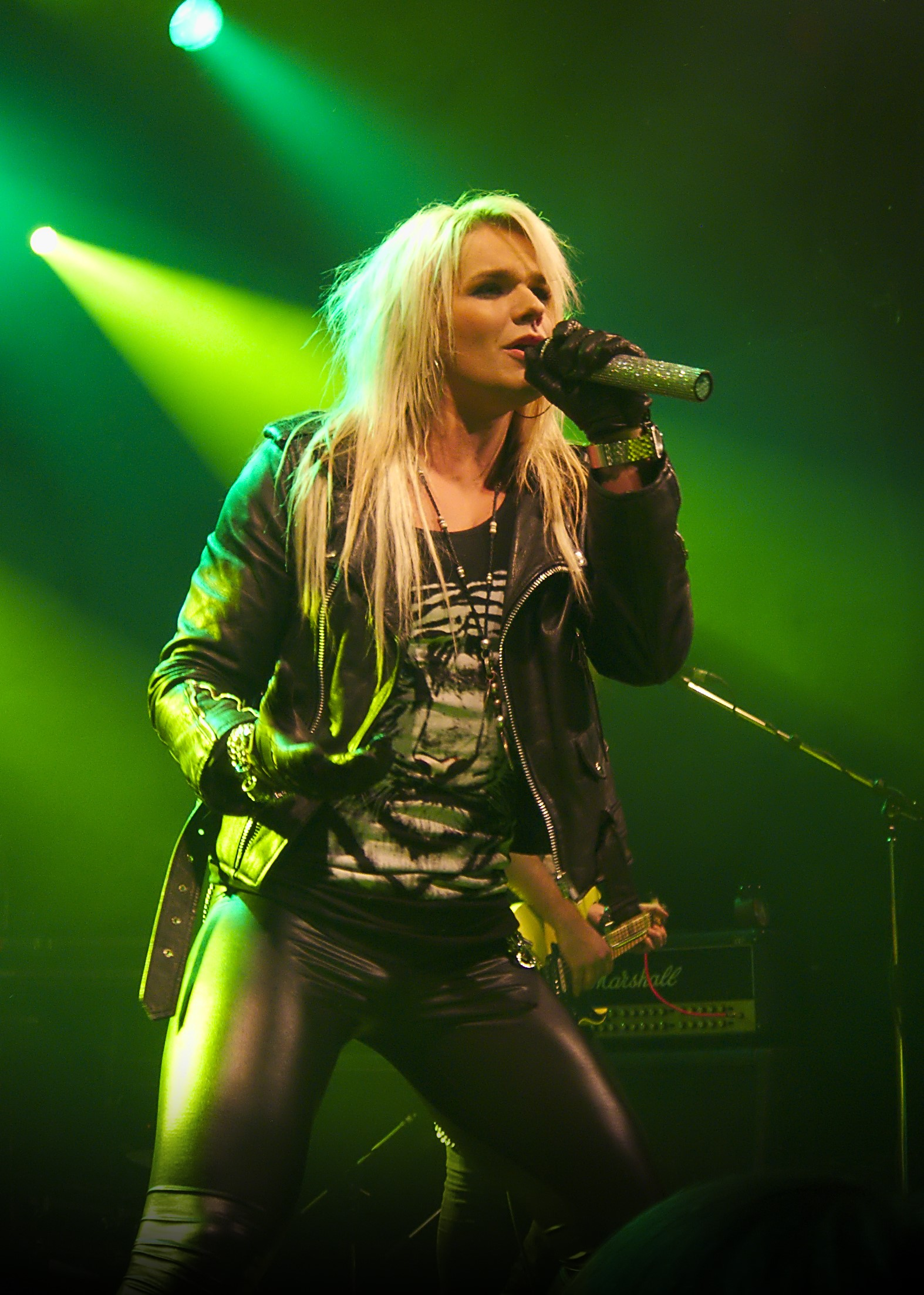
- Olli Herman with Reckless Love live in 2012 at Tavastia Klubi in Helsinki

Background information
- Also known as: H. Olliver Twisted, Olli Herman
- Born: Olli Herman Kosunen; 19 May 1983 (age 43)
- Origin: Kuopio, Finland
- Genres: Hard rock; glam metal
- Occupation: Singer
- Years active: 2001–present
- Label: Universal Music

Olli Herman Kosunen (born 19 May 1983), also known as H. Olliver Twisted, is a Finnish singer who has played in the Swedish glam metal band Crashdïet. Twisted is currently a member of the Finnish glam metal band Reckless Love.

== Career ==
Before he was a member of Crashdïet, he was a member of the Finnish rock band Reckless Love. They released an EP in 2006 called Speed Princess. In 2007 he joined the Swedish hard rock band Crashdïet, to replace their former singer Dave Lepard; who died in January of the previous year. Twisted released one album with Crashdïet, The Unattractive Revolution, which featured the singles; "In the Raw" and "Falling Rain". He went on a world tour with the band to support the album. On 13 July 2008, Twisted left Crashdïet so he could spend more time in his other band, Reckless Love.

Reckless Love released their self-titled debut album on 24 February 2010, and a second album, Animal Attraction, on 5 October 2011. On 21 January 2024, Reckless Love band announced a break after Hessu Maxx(drummer) exit and Olli new project with the Finnish band Popeda started at the beginning of 2024.

== Personal life ==
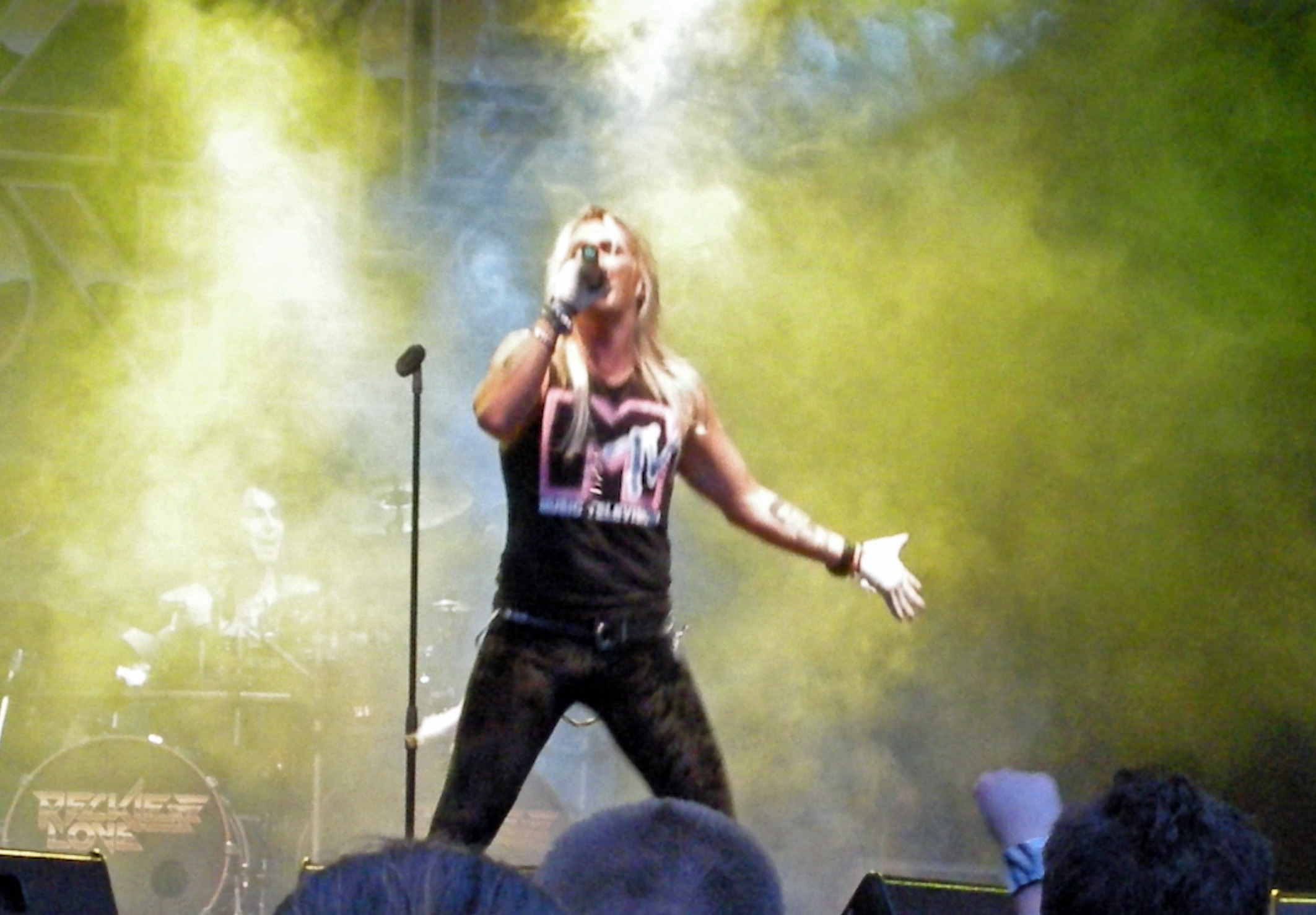
Olli Herman with Reckless Love at Skogsröjet festival in Rejmyre, Sweden, 2012

Twisted married his girlfriend Noora Niemelä on 11 February 2012 in Tampere, Finland. Furthermore, Herman and Noora are the main characters in the Reckless Love music video "Animal Attraction". On 9 February 2017, he confirmed that day's headlines in the Finnish press about him and Noora Niemelä getting divorced.

In February 2022, Herman became the father of a son.

== Discography ==
=== With Crashdïet ===
- The Unattractive Revolution (2007)

Singles/EPs

- "In the Raw" (2007)
- "Falling Rain" (2008)

=== With Reckless Love ===
- Reckless Love (2010)
- Animal Attraction (2011)
- Spirit (2013)
- InVader (2016)
- Turborider (2022)

Singles/EPs

- "So Happy I Could Die" (2013)
- "Nights on Fire" (2013)
- "Hot" (2011)
- "Badass/Get Electric" (2010)
- "Romance" (2010)
- "Beautiful Bomb" (2009)
- "One More Time" (2009)
- "Speed Princess" (2006)
- "Light But Heavy" (2005)
- "TKO" (2005)
- "So Yeah!!" (2004)
