= María Cristina Ramos =

María Cristina Ramos may refer to:

- María Cristina Ramos (writer)
- María Cristina Ramos (model)

== See also ==
- María Ramos (disambiguation)
