= Miss Grand Angola 2023 =

1st Miss Grand Angola competition, beauty pageant edition

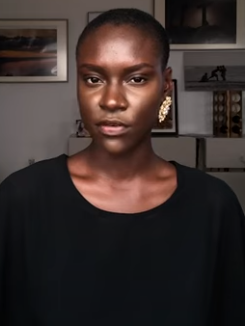
- Winner, Eugénia das Neves
- Date: September 2, 2023
- Presenters: Bráulio Anderson; Whitney Shikongo
- Entertainment: Bass; Heróide Dos Prazeres
- Venue: Epic Sana Hotel, Luanda
- Broadcaster: YouTube
- Entrants: 10
- Placements: 7
- Winner: Eugénia das Neves (Luanda)

Miss Grand Angola 2023 was the inaugural edition of the Miss Grand Angola pageant, held on September 2, 2023, at the Epic Sana Hotel, Luanda. Ten candidates who qualified for the national final round through an audition held on July 9, 2023, at the Mundo da Casa Shopping Mall (MDC), competed for the title. Of whom, a 24-year-old administrative assistant from Luanda, Eugénia das Neves, was elected the winner. Eugénia later represented the country at the international parent stage, Miss Grand International 2023, held in Vietnam on October 25, 2023, and was named the 5th runner-up.

The grand final round of the contest was hosted by Mister Angola 2017, Bráulio Anderson, and Miss Angola 2014, Whitney Shikongo, and was highlighted by live performances of two music bands, Bass and Heroide.

The pageant was financially supported by the MDC Shopping Mall, Água Perla, Kabuiza, and Opal Negra, with an online news portal, Platinaline, as the official media partner.

== Background ==
After two years of returning to join the Miss Grand International pageant, a scheme to conduct the first national contest of Miss Grand Angola was observed in early-July 2023 when the national licensee team led by former Miss Grand Angola, Márcia de Menezes, ran an audition in the MDC Shopping Mall in Luanda to select the national aspirants for the national final contest, which was scheduled for September. The final twelve of the qualified candidates were later revealed in mid-July.

The judges for the audition round included:

- Imanni Da Silva – Model, activist, actress, and fashion designer
- Whitney Shikongo – Miss Angola 2014
- Eryvaldo Reis – Mister Angola 2021 and Mister Africa International 2022
- Marlon Pacheco – Mister Angola 2014
- Victória Garcia – Agency model manager and event organizer

== Result ==
| Position | Delegate |
|---|---|
| Miss Grand Angola 2023 | Eugénia das Neves |
| 1st runner-up | Jacira Saiombo |
| 2nd runner-up | Airania Dias |
| 3rd runner-up | Roberta Capule Paulo |
| 4th runner-up | Angélica Varela |
| Top 7 | Anna Chiquel; Elizandra Costa |

== Candidates ==
Initially, twelve candidates qualified for the national final, but two of them withdrew, making the finalized total of ten candidates.

- Airania Dias
- Amélia Agostinho (withdrew)
- Angélica Varela
- Anna Chiquel
- Elizandra Costa
- Emiliana Milena (withdrew)
- Ester Bleck
- Eugénia das Neves
- Hermenegilda Hitilasa
- Jacira Saiombo
- Laricia Cange
- Roberta Patrícia Capule Paulo
