= 11th Africa Movie Academy Awards =

2015 film awards ceremony

- Date: September 2015
- Site: Port Elizabeth, South Africa
- Hosted by: Omotola Jalade; Camille Winbush
- Organized by: Africa Film Academy

Highlights
- Best Picture: Timbuktu
- Most awards: Timbuktu (5)
- Most nominations: iNumber Number and Run (12)

The 2015 Africa Movie Academy Awards ceremony honouring films of 2014 was scheduled to take place in June 2015 but held on 26 September 2015. The gala night was moved to June as opposed to the regular March–May season in honour of Michael Anyiam-Osigwe, a longtime entertainment patron and brother to the founder and former C.E.O. of the award ceremony, Peace Anyiam-Osigwe. This years' award will be the first in the post-Osigwe's era of the ceremony, after her formal resignation in March.

== Ceremony information ==
Entries to the ceremony were originally opened from 1 September 2014 to 1 December 2014. However, the closing date was extended to 31 January 2015 to enable more entries. Films and documentaries that were produced from December 2013 to December 2014 were eligible for selection. A total of 800 films were submitted to the Film Academy. The nomination ceremony was held in May before the Nigerian presidential inauguration date on the 29th.

== Winners ==
Best Film	Best Director
Timbuktu (Mauritania); October 1 (Nigeria); Triangle: Going to America (Ethiopia); iNumber Number (South Africa); Run (CIV)	Abderrahmane Sissako – Timbuktu (Mauritania); Theodros Teshome Kebede - Triangle Going to America (Ethiopia); Theo Nel – iNumber Number; Philippe Lacôte – Run; Kunle Afolayan – October 1 (Nigeria)
Best Actor in a leading role	Best Actress in a leading role
Sadiq Daba (October 1); Tony Kroroge (Cold Harbour); Sdumo Matshali (iNumber Number); Abdoul Kareem Konate (Run); Gerard Essomba (Le President)	Lesliana Pereira (Njinga: Queen Of Angola); Queen Nwokoye (Chetanna); Aida Wang (Juliet and Romeo); Joselyn Dumas (Silver rain); Ini Edo (While You Slept)
Best Actor in a supporting role	Best Actress in a supporting role
Samson Tadese (Triangle Going to America); Israel Makoe (iNumber Number); Paul Obazele (Iyore); Chumani Pan (Silver Rain); OC Ukeje (Love or Something Like That)	Hilda Dokubo (Stigma); Ama Ampofo (Devil in the Detail); Toulou Kiki (Timbuktu); Reina Salicoulibaly (Run); Prossy Rukundo (Boda Boda Thieves)
Best Young/Promising Actor	Best Child Actor
Kemi Lala Akindoju & Hassan Spike Insingoma (Dazzling Mirage & Boda Boda Thieves); Demola Adedoyin (October 1); Vinjeru Kamanga (Bella); Chiedza Mhende (Love The One You Love)	Layla Walet Mohammed & Mehdi A.G Mohammed (Timbuktu); Joshua Ibrahim & Daniel Ibrahim (A Place in the Stars); Any Bobmanuel & Akonte Bobmanuel (Stigma)
Best First Feature Film by a Director	Bayelsa State Government Endowed Award for Best Nigerian Film
Destiny Ekeragha (Gone too far); Jenna Bass (Love the One You Love); Tawonga Taddja Nkhonjera (Bella); Carey Mckenzie (Cold Harbour)	October 1; Invasion 1897; Dazzling Mirage; Iyore; A Place in the Stars
Best Diaspora Feature Film	Best Diaspora Documentary
Supremacy (USA); Cru (USA); Under the Starry Sky (France)	The Black Panthers: Vanguard of the Revolution (USA); Jimmy Goes to Nollywood – (USA/Haiti); Bound: Africans vs African Americans (USA); Black Panther Woman (Australia)
Ousmane Sembene Award for Best Film in An African Language	Best Documentary
Timbuktu – Mauritania; Triangle Going To America – Ethiopia; Chetanna (Nigeria); Juliet And Romeo (Burkina Faso); iNumber Number (South Africa)	Egypt Modern Pharaohs (Egypt); The Dream Of Shahrazad (South Africa); Nelson Mandela, the Myth and Me (South Africa); Beats of the Antonov (Sudan); The Supreme Price (Nigeria/USA)
Best Diaspora Short film	Efere Ozako Award for Best Short film
Sound Of Tears (Canada); Hand to the Sky (USA); Calm (UK)	Twaaga (Burkina Faso); Stories of Our Lives (Kenya); Aisha’s Story (Nigeria); Gulped of the Blue Sea (Togo); Memoir of a Honest Voice (Sierra Leone)
Best Animation	Achievement in Screenplay
The Legacies Of Rubbies (Nigeria); The Throne (Nigeria); Alternative to Corporal Punishment (Namibia); Akorkoli (Ghana)	Le President (Cameroon); While You Slept; Timbuktu; Love or Something Like That; Run
Achievement in Editing	Achievement in Cinematography
Timbuktu; iNumber Number; Triangle Going to America; Run; October 1	Lonbraz Kann (Mauritius); Triangle Going to America (Ethiopia); iNumber Number (South Africa); Run - Côte d'Ivoire; Timbuktu - Mauritius
Achievement in Sound	Achievement in Visual Effects
Lonbraz Kann; Le President; Timbuktu; Run; iNumber Number	iNumber Number; Invasion 1897; Kpians; Run; Triangle Going To America
Achievement in Soundtrack	Achievement in Makeup
Triangle Going To America; A Place in the Stars; Iyore; Njinga: Queen Of Angola; Timbuktu	Njinga: Queen Of Angola; Run; Iyore; Silver Rain; iNumber Number
Achievement In Costume Design	Achievement In Production Design
October 1; Run; iNumber Number; Njinga: Queen Of Angola; Dazzling Mirage	iNumber Number; October 1; Le President; Run; Timbuktu
Best Film by an African Living Abroad	Best Comedy Film
Fevers - France/Morocco; Gone Too Far - Nigeria/UK; Thorns of Roses (O Esphinho Da Rosa) - Guinea Bissau/Portugal; Affairs of the Heart - Nigeria/USA	30 Days in Atlanta; Iya Alalake; Last Three Digits
Lifetime Achievement Award	Special Jury Prize
Tony Vander Heyden	Le President'; Triangle Going To America
Special Recognition	Posthumous award
Africa Magic; Kingsley Ogoro	Oronto Douglas
Honorary Advisor: Tony Elumelu
