= Miss Grand Angola =

Beauty pageant in Angola

- Formation: September 2, 2023; 3 years ago
- Headquarters: Luanda
- Location: Angola
- Official language: Portuguese
- National director: Edueni António; Márcia de Menezes
- Affiliations: Miss Grand International

Miss Grand Angola is a national beauty pageant in Angola, established in 2023 to select the country’s representative for Miss Grand International. The earliest reference to the title dates to 2013, when Nádia de Vasconcelos, a 26-year-old professional model, was appointed by the London-based event organizer Beauties of Africa Inc. to participate in the inaugural edition of Miss Grand International in Thailand. For reasons that were not officially disclosed, Nádia did not ultimately compete.

The pageant began to assume greater institutional form in 2021, when the franchise rights for Angola were acquired by Márcia de Menezes, a computer engineer and former international contestant. In that year, de Menezes not only directed the national franchise but also represented Angola herself at Miss Grand International, marking the onset of a nationally managed selection process.

Since Angola’s debut in 2015, the country’s highest placement to date was achieved in 2023, when Eugénia das Neves was fifth runner-up. Prior to this, Angola had twice reached to the top 20: by Meriam Kaxuxwena in 2015 and by Márcia de Menezes in 2021.

== History ==
Angola made its inaugural appearance at the Miss Grand International pageant in 2015, when an Angolan-Australian model based in Sydney acquired the national license and designated herself as the country’s representative for the international competition held in Thailand. During this edition, she attained a placement among the top twenty finalists.

Angola re-entered the Miss Grand International competition in 2021, with the national license having been acquired by Márcia de Menezes, a computer engineer residing in Luanda. De Menezes subsequently appointed herself as Angola’s representative for the 2021 international contest in Thailand, where she received the Best National Costume award and entered the top twenty.

In 2022, the national license was transferred to Edueni António, an event organizer. António’s ran the inaugural edition of the pageant in September 2023.

== Editions ==
=== Location and date ===
The following is the competition details for the Miss Grand Angola pageant, held twice in 2023 and 2024.

Edition	Date	Final venue	Entrants	Ref.
1st	2 September 2023	Epic Sana Hotel, Luanda	10	
2nd	31 August 2024	Centro Cultural Paz Flor, Luanda	13	

=== Competition result ===
Edition	Winner	Runners-up				Ref.
Edition	Winner	First	Second	Third	Fourth	Ref.
1st	Eugénia das Neves	Jacira Saiombo	Airania Dias	Roberta Capule Paulo	Angélica Varela	
2nd	Nacira Amaral	Neidi Wanda	Eliany Vitorino	Alda dos Santos	Jéssica Sofia	

== International competition ==
The following is a list of Angolan representatives at the Miss Grand International contest.

Color keys

- : Declared as the winner
- : Ended as a runner-up (Top 5)
- : Ended as a finalist (Top 10)
- : Ended as a semifinalist (Top 20/21)
- : Ended as special awards winner

Year	Province	Miss Grand Angola	Title	Placement	Special Awards	National Director
Did not compete in 2026
2025	Luanda	Elizandra Costa	Top 7 Miss Grand Angola 2023	Unplaced		Edueni António & Márcia de Menezes
2024	Benguela	Nacira Amaral	Miss Grand Angola 2024	Unplaced		Edueni António & Márcia de Menezes
2023	Luanda	Eugénia das Neves	Miss Grand Angola 2023	5th runner-up		Edueni António & Márcia de Menezes
2022	Luanda	Teresa Sara	Top 10 Miss Universe Angola 2022	Unplaced		Edueni António & Márcia de Menezes
2021	Luanda	Márcia de Menezes	Appointed	Top 20	Best National Costume	Edueni António & Márcia de Menezes
Did not compete between 2016-2020
2015	Luanda	Meriam Kaxuxwena	Appointed	Top 20		Meriam Kaxuxwena
Did not compete in 2014
2013	Luanda	Nádia de Vasconcelos	Top 10 Miss Angola 2008	Did not compete		Bongie Munjanja

== Winners gallery ==
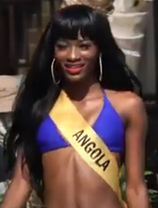
2015, Meriam Kaxuxwena

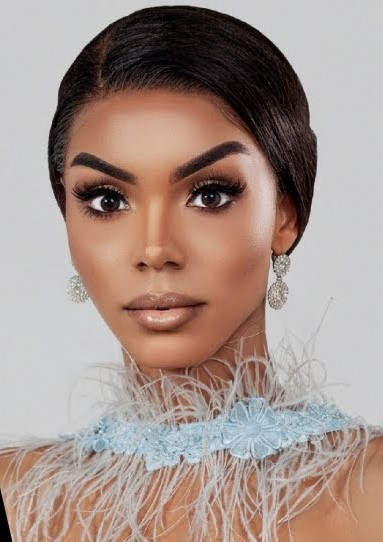
2022, Teresa Sara

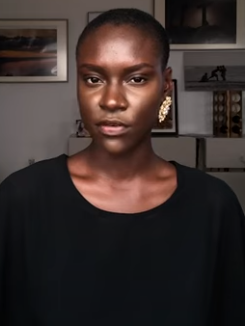
2023, Eugénia das Neves

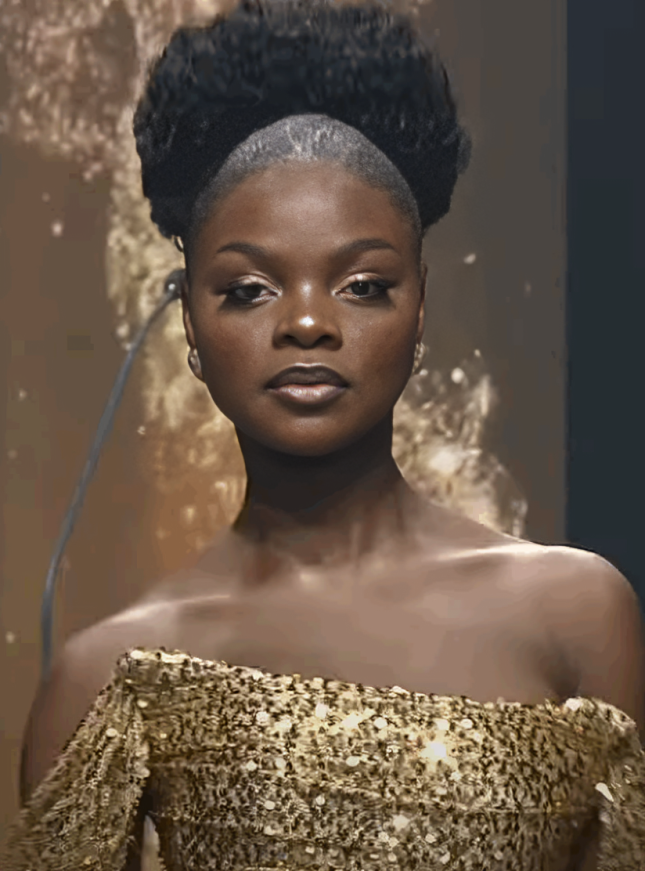
2024, Nacira Amaral

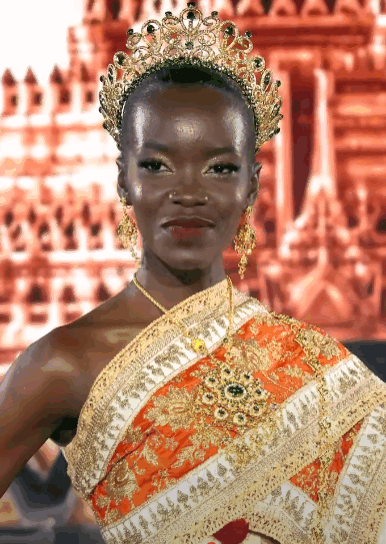
2025, Elizandra da Costa
