= Jurema Ferraz =

Angolan Model

- Born: Jurema Ferraz; 14 February 1985 (age 41); Moçâmedes, Angola
- Height: 5 ft 11 in (1.80 m)
- Beauty pageant titleholder
- Title: Miss Angola 2010
- Hair color: Black
- Eye color: Brown
- Major competitions: Miss Angola 2010 (Winner); Miss Universe 2010

Jurema Ferraz (born 14 February 1985) is an Angolan model and beauty pageant titleholder who was crowned Miss Angola 2010 and represented her country in the 2010 Miss Universe pageant.

== Miss Angola ==
Ferraz, who stands 1.80 m (5 ft 11 in) tall, competed in her country's national beauty pageant, Miss Angola, held in Luanda on December 10, 2009, where she became the eventual winner of the title, gaining the right to represent Angola in Miss Universe 2010.

== Miss Universe 2010 ==
As the official representative of her country to the 2010 Miss Universe pageant broadcast live from Las Vegas, Nevada on 23 August, Ferraz participated as one of the 83 delegates who vied for the crown of eventual winner, Ximena Navarrete of Mexico.

Awards and achievements
Preceded by Nelsa Alves	Miss Angola; 2010	Succeeded by Leila Lopes
