= Miss Grand Angola 2024 =

Angolan Beauty pageant

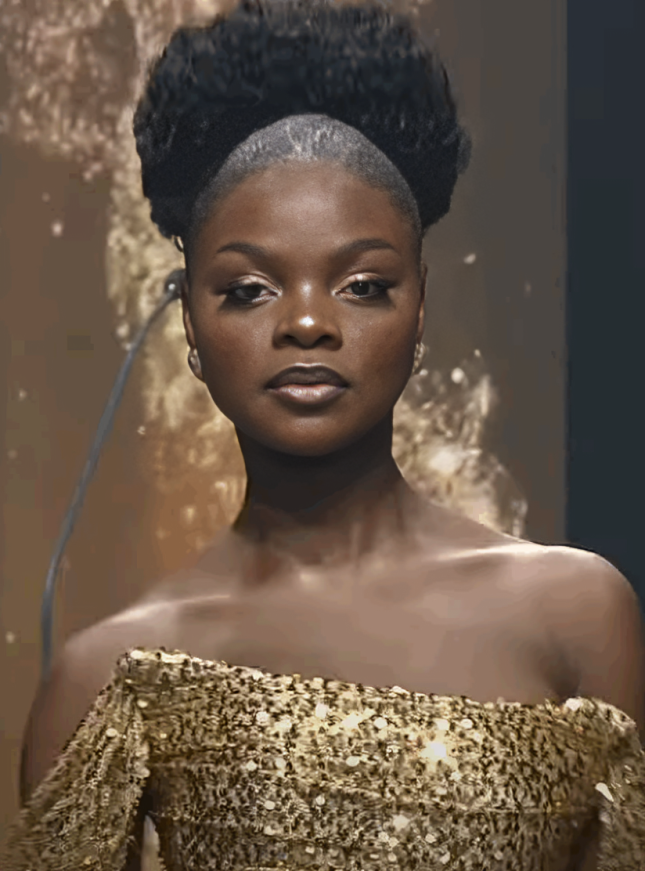
- Winner, Nacira Amaral
- Date: 31 August 2024
- Presenters: Whitney Shikongo
- Entertainment: Button Rose; Ed Ramiro
- Venue: Centro Cultural Paz Flor, Luanda
- Broadcaster: YouTube; Facebook
- Entrants: 13
- Placements: 10
- Winner: Nacira Amaral

Miss Grand Angola 2024 was the second Miss Grand Angola pageant, held on 31 August 2024, at Centro Cultural Paz Flor, Luanda. Thirteen contestants competed for the title.

The contest was won by Nacira Amaral of Dombe Grande, who was crowned by her predecessor Eugénia das Neves of Luanda. Amal will represent Angola at Miss Grand International 2024 in Thailand on 25 October 2024.

The event featured live performances by five Angolan singers, Button Rose, Rafael Sampaio, Luana Praia, Imah Velosa and Ed Ramiros, and was broadcast worldwide on Facebook and YouTube.

== Background ==
The Miss Grand Angola committee, led by former Miss Grand Angola 2021 Márcia de Menezes, opened an application for the 2024 pageant in June 2024 with a casting conducted on 9 July 2024, at the Mundo Da Casa (MDC) in Luanda. Nineteen candidates qualified for the grand final, six withdrew, making the final of thirteen contestants.

On 17 August 2024, the committee announced that the Paz Flor Cultural Center in Luanda would be the venue for the grand final which on 31 August.

== Results ==
Placement	Delegate
Miss Grand Angola 2024	Nacira Amaral
1st runner-up	Neidi Wanda
2nd runner-up	Eliany Vitorino
3rd runner-up	Alda dos Santos
4th runner-up	Jéssica Sofia
Top 10	Adelaide Jorge; Dionísia Catumbela; Esperivânia Sebastião; Helena dos Santos; Suzeth Júnior

== Candidates ==
Thirteen contestants competed for the title.

- Adelaide Jorge
- Alda dos Santos
- Dionísia Catumbela
- Eliany Vitorino
- Esperivânia Sebastião
- Helena dos Santos
- Irondina Nunda
- Jéssica Sofia
- Kassandra dos Santos
- Nacira Amaral
- Neidi Wanda
- Suzeth Júnior
- Ludmila da Costa
