= Luísa Baptista =

Angolan model and beauty pageant contestant

- Born: April 16, 1995 (age 31); Menongue, Cuando Cubango, Angola
- Height: 1.75 m (5 ft 9 in)
- Beauty pageant titleholder
- Title: Miss Angola 2016
- Hair color: Black
- Eye color: Black
- Major competitions: Miss Angola 2016 (Winner); Miss Universe 2016 (Unplaced)

Luísa Baptista (born April 16, 1995) is an Angolan model and beauty pageant titleholder who won the title of Miss Angola 2016 after qualifying as Miss Cuando Cubango, the first time someone from that region had won the Miss Angola title. She represented Angola at Miss Universe 2016.

== Early and personal life ==
Luisa was born and raised in Cuando Cubango, Angola. She is a student at Cuito Cuanavale University, pursuing a degree in psychology.

== Pageantry ==
Baptista qualified to compete at the Miss Angola beauty pageant in 2015 after becoming Miss Cuando Cubango. The prize package consisted of 200,000 Angolan kwanzas, a car, a mobile phone, a television and a stereo. Baptista said afterwards that she hoped to use the victory to promote awareness about HIV/AIDS and cancer among young people. She had been convinced to compete by her family, as she hoped to qualify for a scholarship through participation. She said until then she did not see herself as a beauty queen, who due to her short height (1.75m).

In December 2015, 20-year-old Baptista won the title of Miss Angola 2016 out of 17 contestants, the first to win from Cuando Cubango. She succeeded Whitney Shikongo, who was competing in Miss Universe 2015 at that time. She was crowned by Miss Universe 2011 Leila Lopes. Baptista's goal as Miss Angola is to be an ambassador of projects and social actions. On her return to her native province, she was paraded through the streets of Menongue in a procession.

Since winning the title, she has visited orphanages in Kilamba, maternity clinics, and the regional pageant contests for the following year. Baptista competed at Miss Universe 2016, but was unplaced.

Awards and achievements
Preceded by Whitney Shikongo	Miss Angola; 2016	Succeeded by Lauriela Martins
