= María Ramos =

María Ramos may refer to:

- María Cristina Ramos (writer)
- María Cristina Ramos (model)
- María Yesica Ramos, Bolivian footballer
- María de Lourdes Ramos Rivera, Puerto Rican politician
- Maria Ramos (businesswoman), South African businesswoman and civil servant
