= Njinga: Queen of Angola =

2013 Angolan film

- Film poster
- Portuguese: Njinga: Rainha de Angola
- Directed by: Sérgio Graciano
- Written by: Isilda Hurst; Joana Jorge
- Produced by: Coréon Dú; Renato Freitas; Sergio Neto
- Starring: Lesliana Pereira; Erica Chissapa; Ana Santos; Sílvio Nascimento; Miguel Hurst; Jaime Joaquim; Orlando Sérgio
- Cinematography: Rui Amado
- Edited by: António Gonçalves
- Production company: Semba Comunicação
- Release date: 8 November 2013 (Angola)
- Running time: 109 minutes
- Country: Angola
- Languages: Portuguese & Kimbundu
- Budget: approx $1 million

Njinga: Queen of Angola (Portuguese: Njinga: Rainha de Angola) is a 2013 Angolan historical epic film directed by Sérgio Graciano. The film stars the 2007 Miss Angola Lesliana Pereira as Queen Njinga Mbandi, fighting to liberate Angola.

== Plot ==
The film is set in 17th-century Angola and presents the true story of Queen Njinga Mbandi. While her father is king, she trains in military strategy. Her father, brother and nephew each take turns leading their people, but all meet a mysterious death. Njinga then becomes queen, leading wars against the Portuguese and resisting the Dutch invasion.

== Cast ==
- Lesliana Pereira as Queen Njinga Mbandi
- Erica Chissapa as Kifunji
- Ana Santos
- Sílvio Nascimento as Jaga Kasa Cangola
- Miguel Hurst as Njali
- Jaime Joaquim as Mbandi
- Orlando Sérgio as Jaga Casacassage
- Alvaro Miguel as Kilwanji
- Ana Almeida as Kambo
- Yuri de Sousa as Capitao Jaga

== Production ==
It took six years for the producers to raise money to make the film. Screenwriter Isilda Hurst spent two and a half years researching the Queen and the historical context of her story. The studio consulted historians while researching for the film. Filming took place in Kissama National Park in Angola over nine weeks. The filmmakers chose to use Portuguese as the primary language of the film because they felt it would allow the greatest number of Angolans to understand the film, even though that is historically inaccurate.

== Release ==
The film was screened at the 2014 Montreal World Film Festival. It then premiered in the UK at the Film Africa film festival in London on 6 November 2014, and advance tickets sold out so quickly that the film had to be moved to a larger venue. It screened again during the African Diaspora International Film Festival in Washington, DC.

== Reception ==
In African Studies Review, Fernando Arenas wrote that despite the characters lacking emotional depth, the film "stands out in the context of African cinema for its ambition in portraying one of the monumental chapters of the continent's history". The film won two awards at the 2015 Africa Movie Academy Awards: Best Actress in a leading role for Lesliana Pereira and Achievement in Makeup. Carolin Overhoff Ferreira wrote a critical study which analyses the misconceptions on Africa and the slave trade reproduced in the film.

== Television adaptation ==
The film was adapted into a television show of the same name, which aired from 2014 to 2015.
