= Ni Ni Lin Eain =

Burmese beauty pageant titleholder

- နီနီလင်းအိမ်
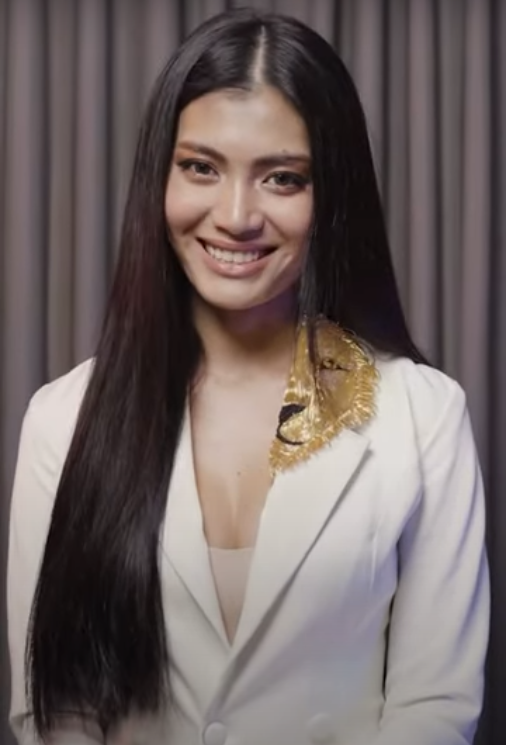
- Ni Ni Lin Eain in 2023
- Born: Ni Ni Kyaw Zin; Mudon, Myanmar
- Education: Building and Construction Authority Academy, Toa Payoh, Singapore
- Occupation: Model
- Beauty pageant titleholder
- Title: Miss Grand Myanmar 2023
- Major competitions: Miss Grand Myanmar 2023; (Winner); Miss Grand International 2023; (1st Runner-up); (Miss Popular Vote); (Country's Power of the Year)

Ni Ni Lin Eain (နီနီလင်းအိမ်) is a Myanmar beauty pageant titleholder who won Miss Grand Myanmar 2023, and was first runner up at Miss Grand International 2023.

== Education ==
Ni Ni Lin Eain has a Bachelors degree in Civil Engineering from the Building and Construction Authority Academy in Toa Payoh, Singapore.

== Pageantry ==
Ni Ni Lin Eain's first pageant was Miss Universe Myanmar 2022, where she reached the top 16. She later withdrew for personal reasons. In November 2022, Ni Ni Lin Eain was appointed as the Myanmar representative to Miss Grand International 2023 by Glamorous International.

Ni Ni Lin Eain represented Myanmar at Miss Grand International 2023, at the Phú Thọ Indoor Stadium in Ho Chi Minh City, Vietnam. She won the Global Beauties Choice, Miss Photogenic, the Grand Pageant's Choice, the Country's Power of the Year, and the Miss Popular Vote awards. At the end of the competition, Luciana Fuster of Peru won, and Ni Ni Lin Eain was the first runner-up.

== Filmography ==
=== Advertising ===
Year	Product	Company	Ref.
2022	Bella matte Love Blush	Bella Cosmetics	
2022	A+ Wallet	A Bank	
2023	Flourish Shampoo	Virtue Labs	
2023	Fit Me Foundation	Maybelline	
2024	Aung Thamardi Gold & Jewelry	Aung Thamardi Gold, Jewelry Shops and Refinery	
2024	Eternal Weint Sein	Weint Sein Gold and Jewelry Shop	

Awards and achievements
Preceded by Ei Ei Aung Htunt	Miss Grand Myanmar; 2024	Succeeded by (Myanmar) Thae Su Nyein
Preceded by (Mauritius) Yuvna Rinishta	Miss Popular Vote; 2023	Succeeded by (Indonesia) Nova Liana
Preceded by (Vietnam) Đoàn Thiên Ân	Country's Power of the Year; 2023	Succeeded by (Thailand) Malin Chara-anan
Preceded by (Thailand) Engfa Waraha	Miss Grand International 1st Runner-Up; 2023	Succeeded by (Philippines) Christine Juliane Opiaza (Elevated) (Brazil) Talita Hartmann (Assumed)
