= Marcelina Vahekeni =

Angolan model

- Born: Marcelina Vahekeni; November 2, 1990 (age 35); Ondjiva, Angola
- Height: 1.78 m (5 ft 10 in)
- Beauty pageant titleholder
- Title: Miss Angola 2011
- Hair color: Black
- Major competitions: Miss Angola 2011 (Winner); Miss Universe 2012 (Unplaced)

Marcelina Vahekeni (born November 2, 1990) is an Angolan model and beauty pageant titleholder who was crowned Miss Angola 2011 and represented her country in the 2012 Miss Universe pageant.

== Miss Angola ==
Miss Cunene, Marcelina Vahekeni was crowned Miss Angola 2011, by Leila Lopes, Miss Universe 2011 who had the honor of delivering the crown on Saturday, 3 December at the gala teve place in the Conference Center of Fine in Luanda.

== Miss Universe 2012 ==
Marcelina Vahekeni represented Angola in Miss Universe 2012 held in Las Vegas. Her appearance in her national costume, which included a depiction of a traditionally bare-breasted Angolan woman, was displayed in Time Magazine's Style section.

Awards and achievements
Preceded by Leila Lopes	Miss Angola; 2011	Succeeded by Vaumara Rebelo
