= Ana Liliana Avião =

Miss Angola 2018

- Born: Ana Liliana Avião; August 25, 1994 (age 32); Luanda, Angola
- Height: 1.83 m (6 ft 0 in)
- Beauty pageant titleholder
- Title: Miss Angola 2018
- Hair color: Black
- Eye color: Brown
- Major competitions: Miss Universe 2018 (Unplaced)

Ana Liliana Avião (born 25 August 1994) is an Angolan model and beauty pageant titleholder who won Miss Angola 2018. She represented Angola at Miss Universe 2018 pageant.

== Personal life ==
She is a resident of the Netherlands. She holds a bachelor's degree in business studies.

== Pageantry ==
=== Miss Angola 2018 ===
Avião was crowned as the winner of Miss Angola 2018 in a national finale held at Luanda. She succeeded outgoing Miss Angola 2017, Lauriela Martins.

=== Miss Universe 2018 ===
Avião represented Angola at Miss Universe 2018 pageant in Bangkok, Thailand.

Awards and achievements
Preceded by Lauriela Martins	Miss Angola; 2018	Succeeded by Salett Miguel
