= Timbuktu (2014 film) =

2014 film

- Theatrical release poster
- Directed by: Abderrahmane Sissako
- Written by: Abderrahmane Sissako; Kessen Tall
- Produced by: Sylvie Pialat
- Starring: Ibrahim Ahmed dit Pino; Toulou Kiki; Abel Jafri; Fatoumata Diawara; Hichem Yacoubi; Kettly Noël; Mehdi Ag Mohamed; Layla Walet Mohamed; Adel Mahmoud Cherif; Salem Dendou
- Cinematography: Sofian El Fani
- Edited by: Nadia Ben Rachid
- Music by: Amine Bouhafa
- Production companies: Les Films du Worso; Dune Vision; Arches Films; Arte France Cinéma; Orange Studio
- Distributed by: Le Pacte
- Release dates: 15 May 2014 (Cannes); 10 December 2014 (France)
- Running time: 96 minutes
- Countries: Mauritania; France
- Languages: Hassaniya Arabic; English; French; Tamasheq; Bambara
- Box office: $7.2 million

Timbuktu is a 2014 drama film directed and co-written by Abderrahmane Sissako. The film centres on the brief occupation of Timbuktu, Mali by Ansar Dine, and is partially influenced by the 2012 public stoning of an unmarried couple in Aguelhok.

Shot in Oualata, Mauritania, Timbuktu was selected to compete for the Palme d'Or in the main competition section at the 2014 Cannes Film Festival, where it won the Prize of the Ecumenical Jury and the François Chalais Prize. Timbuktu was chosen as Mauritania's submission for the Academy Award for Best Foreign Language Film, and went on to be nominated for the prize at the 87th Academy Awards; it was also nominated for the BAFTA Award for Best Film Not in the English Language at the 69th British Academy Film Awards. Timbuktu was named Best Film at the 11th Africa Movie Academy Awards, where it was nominated for ten further awards. In 2017, The New York Times ranked it the 12th best film of the 21st century so far.

== Plot ==
Armed members of the Ansar Dine group pursue a gazelle across the sandy desert in a jeep. Later, they take aim at intricately carved wooden sculptures in the Bambara style, which include depictions of bare-breasted women. Upon reaching Timbuktu, a city known for its tolerant interpretation of Islam, the jihadists impose strict clothing regulations, critiquing the length of pant legs and mandating burkas, gloves, and stockings for women in public. They swiftly prohibit television, radio, football, alcohol, music, and loitering. Despite armed enforcement, when the foreigners enter a local mosque wearing shoes, the Imam diplomatically rebukes their rules and dismisses them.

Beyond Timbuktu, a family resides in a nomad's tent: the father Kidane, mother Satima who eschews veiling, their daughter Toya, and adopted son Issan. They subsist on livestock, owning eight cattle and goats. Their prized cow, GPS, is pregnant, and Kidane plans to gift the calf to Issan. While Issan tends to the cows near the river, he encounters Amadou, a fisherman, who has set his nets. Meanwhile, a water seller transports water from the river to tent-dwelling families on a motorcycle.

Meanwhile, the jihadists tighten their grip on the city, shooting propaganda videos, patrolling for music enthusiasts, and discussing football fervently. The youth resort to playing ball-less football, as the jihadists confiscate the ball. One jihadist, chauffeured through the desert, visits Satima in Kidane's absence, offering his number despite her rejection.

During a grazing trip, GPS becomes entangled in Amadou's nets. Enraged, Amadou fatally spears the cow. Issan rushes back to the tent in tears, recounting the incident to Kidane. Against Satima's counsel, Kidane confronts Amadou, resulting in a struggle and a fatal shot. Kidane is apprehended by a patrol and jailed. As he faces a murder charge, Kidane implores a guard to inform Satima. She and Toya wait atop a dune for news.

Kidane's trial proceeds in Arabic, requiring translation for him. Seeking empathy, he highlights his daughter's plight to the jihadist judge, assuming shared ethnic ties due to language. However, the translator, hailing from Libya like many Tuareg jihadists, remains impassive.

Meanwhile, musicians and a singer face arrest and flogging, while a couple is stoned to death for their alleged romance. A girl, found with a cellphone, is forcibly married against her will, disregarding the Imam's plea for intervention.

Just before Kidane's execution, the water seller brings Satima to the site. As they rush towards each other, they are fatally shot. As the water seller escapes into the desert, Toya and Issan are left wandering, grief-stricken.

== Cast ==
- Ibrahim Ahmed dit Pino as Kidane
- Toulou Kiki as Satima
- Abel Jafri as Abdelkerim
- Fatoumata Diawara as Fatou la chanteuse
- Hichem Yacoubi as a jihadist
- Kettly Noël as Zabou
- Mehdi Ag Mohamed as Issan
- Layla Walet Mohamed as Toya
- Adel Mahmoud Cherif as L'Imam
- Salem Dendou as jihadist leader

== Themes ==
Throughout the film, subsidiary scenes show the reactions of Timbuktu's residents to the jihadist rule. A female fishmonger is made to wear gloves whilst selling fish; a woman is taken overnight and forcibly married after her family declines a jihadist's offer of marriage; a woman is lashed for singing and for being in the company of men not in her family; a couple is stoned to death for adultery.

The film acknowledges the failure of the jihadists to live up to their own rules. Abdelkerim hides his smoking but it is common knowledge among his fellow occupiers; football is banned, but a group of French jihadists are seen discussing their favourite football players.

They are also observed to be less knowledgeable and secure in their convictions; they do not know how to respond when a woman is found singing, but in praise of Allah, nor when local men play football with an imaginary ball. In conversations with the local imam, the jihadists cherrypick aspects of sharia law in order to justify their actions. When attempting to make a propaganda video, a jihadist admits he lacks conviction in what he is saying.

The characters speak Arabic, French, Tamasheq, Bambara, and English, as noted in the constant use of translation and interpretation on the jihadists' parts to aid them in enshrining their interpretation of sharia to the city. The traditional ways of life are interspersed with the modern, such as characters, even the nomadic Tuareg in the desert, communicating by mobile phones; the jihadists recording propaganda with a camera and lamp.

== Production ==
The film, Sissako's fifth, was inspired by the true story of a young, unmarried couple, who were stoned to death by Islamists in Aguelhok, a rural region in eastern Mali. Sissako originally wanted to make a film about slavery in Mauritania, but this storyline was deemed unacceptable by the country's president, Mohamed Ould Abdel Aziz. Sissako agreed to instead make a film on jihadists, with the support of the Mauritanian government, who provided financial and human resources to the filmmaker. Sissako had initially intended to film in Timbuktu, but resorted to Mauritania after a suicide bomber attacked a checkpoint near the city's airport.

== Reception ==
=== Critical reception ===
On Rotten Tomatoes, the film has a 98% approval rating and an average rating of 7.70/10 based on 124 reviews. The website's critical consensus reads: "Gracefully assembled and ultimately disquieting, Timbuktu is a timely film with a powerful message." It also received a score of 92 out of 100 on Metacritic, based on 31 critics, indicating "universal acclaim". According to both Metacritic and Rotten Tomatoes, Timbuktu is the best reviewed foreign-language film of 2015.

Jay Weissberg of Variety writes: "In the hands of a master, indignation and tragedy can be rendered with clarity yet subtlety, setting hysteria aside for deeper, more richly shaded tones. Abderrahmane Sissako is just such a master." In a review for The Daily Telegraph, Tim Robey suggested it was a "wrenching tragic fable, Aesop-like in its moral clarity." He went on to say it was "full of life, irony, poetry and bitter unfairness."

In the Financial Times, Nigel Andrews called it "skilful, sardonic, honourably humane." Reviewing it for The Guardian, Jonathan Romney called it, "witty, beautiful and even, sobering though it is, highly entertaining" as well as "mischievous and imaginative." He concluded that it was "a formidable statement of resistance."

Sight & Sound's Nick Pinkerton says "The fact remains that there are few filmmakers alive today wearing a mantle of moral authority comparable to that which Sissako has taken upon himself, and if his film has been met with an extraordinary amount of acclaim, it is because he manages to wear this mantle lightly, and has not confused drubbing an audience with messages with profundity. I can’t imagine the film having been made any other way, by anyone else – and this is one measure of greatness."

=== Accolades ===
Following its premiere at the 2014 Cannes Film Festival, Timbuktu won two awards; the Prize of the Ecumenical Jury and the François Chalais Prize. The film won the New York Film Critics Circle Award for Best Foreign Language Film and the National Society of Film Critics Award for Best Foreign Language Film, and was nominated for the Academy Award for Best Foreign Language Film and the BAFTA Award for Best Film Not in the English Language. In 2016, it was voted the 36th best film of the 21st century as picked by 177 film critics from around the world.

At the 11th Africa Movie Academy Awards, Timbuktu won the most prizes with five, including for Best Film, Best Director (for Sissako), Best Child Actor (for Walet Mohammed and Mohammed), Best Film in an African Language, and Achievement in Editing; in total, the film received 11 nominations.

== See also ==
- List of submissions to the 87th Academy Awards for Best Foreign Language Film
- List of Mauritanian submissions for the Academy Award for Best Foreign Language Film
