= Micaela Reis =

Angolan beauty pageant titleholder, Miss Angola in 2007

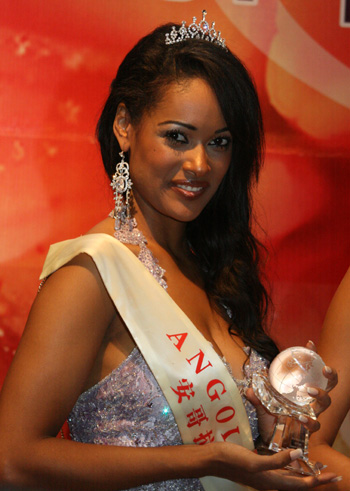
- Reis in 2007
- Born: December 21, 1988 (age 37); Luanda, Angola
- Height: 1.75 m (5 ft 9 in)
- Beauty pageant titleholder
- Title: Miss Angola 2007; Miss Angola Mundo 2007
- Major competitions: Miss Universe 2007; (Top 10); Miss World 2007; (1st Runner-Up)

Micaela Patrícia Reis (born December 21, 1988) is an Angolan actress, businesswoman, TV presenter, independent producer and beauty pageant titleholder. Reis graduated in cinema, television and performing arts from the New York Film Academy in the United States.

== Early life ==
Reis was born on December 21, 1988, in Luanda Province, Angola. Reis' Portuguese father died before her birth, so she was raised by her Angolan mother and her older siblings. She won the 2007 Miss Angola contest in December 2006 representing Angolans in Portugal.

== Pageantry ==
=== Miss Universe 2007 ===
Reis made it into the Top 10 at the 2007 Miss Universe pageant held in Mexico City, Mexico, on 28 May 2007. She placed 5th in swimsuit with a score of 9.150 and then 7th in evening gown with a score of 8.363. She finished 7th overall.

=== Miss World 2007 ===
After Miss Universe, Reis went on to compete at the 2007 Miss World pageant, which was held on December 1 in Sanya, China where she finished as first runner-up to eventual winner, Zhang Zilin of China. Reis was also named Miss World Africa at the end of the event. This is the highest placement for Angola in Miss World.

== Life after Miss Angola ==
After competing in Miss World, Micaela posed for FHM Portugal covering their June issue and was also a judge in the Miss Universe Tanzania 2008 competition.

== Filmography ==
Reis starred in the Angolan soap opera television series Windeck, which became an international success. Set in Luanda, the series portrayed a thrilling story exposing the actions of individuals who spare no means to achieve their goals. In the series, she portrayed Victoria Kajibanga, a desperate sister willing to go to extreme lengths, even considering selling out her own sister, to attain her desires in life.

Reis' first TV series was Voo Directo. A co production between Angola and Portugal, it told the story of four flight attendants. Micaela played the part of Yara, a sweet girl, who falls in love with a man online.

Awards and achievements
| Preceded by Isménia Júnior | Miss Angola; 2007 | Succeeded by Lesliana Pereira |
| Preceded by Stiviandra Oliveira | Miss Angola Mundo; 2007 | Succeeded by Brigith dos Santos |
| Preceded by (Romania) Ioana Boitor | 1st Runner-up Miss World; 2007 | Succeeded by (India) Parvathy Omanakuttan |
