= Ana Coimbra =

Angolan model and beauty pageant titleholder

Ana Bárbara Coimbra
- Born: 5 March 2000 (age 26); Benguela, Angola
- Occupation: Model
- Height: 1.79 m (5 ft 10 1/2 in)
- Beauty pageant titleholder
- Title: Miss Angola 2023
- Major competitions: Miss Angola 2023 (Winner); Miss Universe 2023 (Unplaced)

Ana Bárbara Coimbra (born 5 March 2000) is an Angolan model and beauty pageant titleholder who was crowned Miss Universe Angola 2023. She was elected Miss Angola Universe 2023 on July 22, 2023, at the Talatona Convention Center, in Luanda, in a gala that featured musical performance by C4Pedro, in Luanda.

== Background ==
=== Early life ===
Coimbra was born on 10 November 1999, in Benguela, a city in western Angola, capital of Benguela Province. She graduated in economics from Portugal.

=== Charity work ===
On 15 September 2023, Coimbra visited the municipality of Icolo and Bengo, in a project that aims to encourage and raise awareness among society about the importance of family agriculture titled "Friday in Lavra". She reiterated her bet in projects to combat hunger and extreme poverty by donating, on 3 October 2023, about 100 basic baskets to needy families in the district of Vila Verde, municipality of Belas, in Luanda.

Coimbra encouraged the Women of SIC to adopt preventive measures against breast cancer. The appeal was made in a lecture held on 17 October 2023, at the Amphitheater of the General Management of SIC in Cacuaco, on an initiative of the SIC Women's Network in reference to the Pink October, being the guest of honor and representative of the Angolan Women.

== Pageantry ==
=== Miss Universe 2023 ===
Coimbra represented Angola at The 72nd Miss Universe 2023 in El Salvador at the pageant venue Adolfo Pineda National Gymnasium (Gimnasio Nacional Adolfo Pineda) on 18 November 2023.

Awards and achievements
Preceded by Swelia Da Silva Antonio	Miss Angola; 2023	Succeeded by Nelma Ferreira
