= Lauriela Martins =

Angolan beauty pageant titleholder

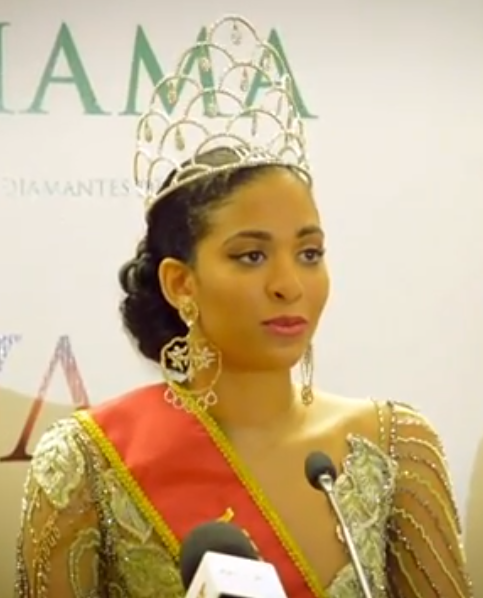
- Martins in 2017
- Born: Angola
- Beauty pageant titleholder
- Title: Miss Angola 2017
- Major competitions: Miss Angola 2017; Miss Universe 2017 (Unplaced); Miss International 2025 (Top 20)

Lauriela Martins is an Angolan beauty pageant titleholder who was crowned Miss Angola 2017 and represented Angola at Miss Universe 2017. In 2025, she also represented Angola at Miss International 2025.

== Pageantry ==
=== Miss Universe 2017 ===
Martins was crowned Miss Angola 2017 on 18 December 2016. This earned her the right to represent Angola at Miss Universe 2017 in Las Vegas, Nevada. However, she failed to reach the top 16.

=== Miss International 2025 ===
Eight years later, Martins represented Angola at Miss International 2025 in Tokyo, Japan, where she reached the top 20.

Awards and achievements
Preceded by Luísa Baptista	Miss Angola; 2017	Succeeded by Ana Liliana Avião
