= Victoria Olguín =

Bolivian model and beauty queen (born 1999)

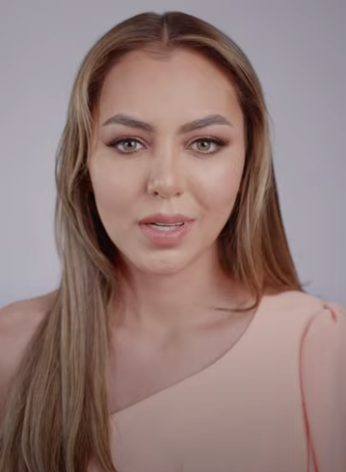
- Victoria Olguín in 2023
- Born: Victoria Olguín Pol; July 17, 1999 (age 27); Cochabamba, Bolivia
- Height: 1.79 m (5 ft 10 1/2 in)
- Beauty pageant titleholder
- Title: Miss Grand Bolivia 2023
- Major competitions: Miss Bolivia 2023 (Miss Grand Bolivia); Miss Grand International 2023 (Unplaced)

Victoria Olguín Pol (born July 17, 1999) is a Bolivian model and beauty pageant titleholder. Olguín was crowned Miss Cochabamba 2023 and she represented her department in Miss Bolivia 2023 where she was the winner of the Miss Grand Bolivia 2023 title with which she participated in the Miss Grand International 2023 beauty pageant represented Bolivia.

== Early life and education ==
Olguín was born and raised in Cochabamba . She is the daughter of Óscar Olguín and Victoria Pol. Victoria attended and graduated from the Bolivian Catholic University with a bachelor's degree in Business Administration.

== Pageantry ==
=== Miss Cochabamba 2023 ===
On Thursday, March 9, Olguín was crowned Miss Cochabamba 2023, thus obtaining the right to represent Cochabamba with the title of Miss Cochabamba 2023.

=== Miss Bolivia 2023 ===
On Saturday, July 1, Victoria competed against 27 candidates from different parts of the country in order to win the title of Miss Bolivia 2023. In this event, she managed to win the title of Miss Grand Bolivia 2023, and her participation in the pageant is expected. beauty Miss Grand International that will take place on Wednesday, October 22, 2023, which will take place in Ho Chi Minh City, Vietnam.

Awards and achievements
Preceded by Camila Sanabria	Miss Grand Bolivia; 2023	Succeeded by Carolina Granier
