= Stiviandra Oliveira =

Angolan model

- Born: 1989 (age 36–37); Huíla, Angola

Stiviandra Oliveira (born 1989, in Huíla) is an Angolan model and beauty pageant titleholder who won the Miss Angola 2006 pageant.

Starting the year 2017, Oliveira, under the supervision of the Comite Miss Angola, will be the National Director of Miss Earth Angola.

Preceded by (Tanzania) Nancy Sumari	Miss World Africa; 2006	Succeeded by (Angola) Micaela Reis
