= Lesliana Pereira =

Angolan actress, model and beauty pageant titleholder (born 1987)

- Born: 9 October 1987 (age 38); Soyo, Angola
- Occupations: Actress and model
- Modeling information
- Height: 1.72 m (5 ft 8 in)

Lesliana Massoxi Amaro Gomes Pereira, known simply as Lesliana Pereira, is an Angolan actress, model and beauty pageant titleholder. She was crowned Miss Angola 2007. She went on to represent her country at Miss Universe 2008, but was unplaced. In 2014, she starred in the film Njinga: Queen of Angola as Queen Njinga Mbandi, a role that earned her Best Actress at the 11th Africa Movie Academy Awards.

Pereira was born in the town Soyo in Angola.

== 2008–2013: Miss Angola ==
Pereira was crowned Miss Angola in 2007 and represented her nation in the Miss Universe 2008. Alongside Miss Universe winner, Leila Lopes, Periera was interviewed in the popular Portuguese TV show Programa do Jô.

She auditioned against Erica Chissapa for a role in the Xuxa Meneghel film, Xuxa in the Mystery of Feiurinha. She eventually got the role of Fadona in the film, which was released in January 2010. The film was commercially successful, and sold more than Avatar in its first week in Angola.

== 2013–2015: Njinga: Queen of Angola ==
Pereira's role in the 2014 historical film, Njinga: Queen of Angola shot her to greater limelight. The film tells a story of how an Angolan Queen held opposing positions with the colonial masters. The film was screened in several countries including London, in the UK. During the film festival by Film Africa, the number of tickets requested for the film was far greater than the seats available. The organizers had to relocate to a bigger room to accommodate viewers of the film.

The film was not only commercially successful but also garnered her awards including Best Actress at the 11th Africa Movie Academy Awards.

This has led to high-profile interviews with popular British TV show, Arise News and her leading a reportage for Revista Africa of Globo Internacional. As part of her social responsibilities, she has publicly advocated for the awareness and protection against HIV/AIDS.

In 2015, Pereira played a role in Brazilian soap opera I Love Paraisópolis.

== Filmography ==
- Xuxa in The Mystery of Feiurinha as Fadona (2010)
- Jikulumessu as Claudia Gaspar (2014)
- Njinga: Queen Of Angola (2014)
- I Love Paraisópolis (2015)
- A Nobreza do Amor (2026)
