= Super Sireyna Worldwide 2018 =

- Date: May 19, 2018
- Presenters: Luan Dy; Ryan Agoncillo; Allan K
- Venue: Broadway Centrum, Manila, Philippines
- Broadcaster: GMA Network
- Entrants: 8
- Placements: 3
- Debuts: Angola; Australia; Brazil; Mexico; Spain; United States
- Withdrawals: Ecuador; India; Germany; Japan; Nigeria; Thailand
- Winner: Nicole Guevarra Flores; Philippines
- Super Costume: Miranda Lombardo; Mexico

Super Sireyna Worldwide 2018 was the 2nd Super Sireyna Worldwide pageant, held on 19 May 2018. The event was held at Broadway Centrum, Manila, Philippines. Miss Sahhara of Nigeria crowned her successor Nicole Guevarra Flores of Philippines at the end of the event.

== Results ==
=== Placements ===
Final results	Contestant
Super Sireyna Worldwide 2018	Philippines – Nicole Guevarra Flores
1st Runner-Up	Angola – Imanni Da Silva
2nd Runner-Up	Mexico – Miranda Lombardo

=== Special awards ===
Special Awards	Contestant
Best Talent	Philippines – Nicole Guevarra Flores
Best National Costume	Mexico – Miranda Lombardo
Most Voted Online	Philippines – Nicole Guevarra Flores

== Contestants ==
Eight contestants competed for the title:

Country	Contestant	Hometown
Angola	Imanni Da Silva	Luanda
Australia	Tahlia Talz	Sydney
Brazil	Izabelle Coimbra	São Paulo
Mexico	Miranda Lombardo	Matamoros
Philippines	Nicole Guevarra Flores	Olongapo City
Spain	Aleikasandria Barros	Barcelona
United States	Kataluna Enriquez	Las Vegas
