= Miss Grand Puerto Rico =

Beauty pageant title in Puerto Rico

- Formation: 2013
- Type: Beauty pageant
- Headquarters: San Juan
- Location: Puerto Rico
- Members: Miss Grand International
- Official language: Spanish
- National director: María Eugenia Félix Paredes

Miss Grand Puerto Rico is a national title bestowed upon a woman chosen to represent Puerto Rico at Miss Grand International, an annual international beauty pageant promoting peace and opposing all forms of conflict. The national pageant of Miss Grand International for Puerto Rico is currently conducted by María Eugenia Félix Paredes, to which MGI PLC, the owner of Miss Grand International, awarded the franchise. Nuestra Belleza Puerto Rico, Inc. retained the franchise alongside others, including Miss International, and Miss and Mister Supranational, from 2016 to 2026 under Miguel Rene Deliz. Delia Cruz, holder of Miss World Puerto Rico, possessed the franchise from 2013 to 2015.

The highest placement of Puerto Rico's representative at Miss Grand International is the winner, won in 2013 by former Miss World Puerto Rico 2011, Janelee Chaparro.

== History ==
=== 2013–2015: Delia Cruz ===
Puerto Rico debuted in Miss Grand International in 2013, and the franchise was under the Miss World Puerto Rico contest until 2016, when a San Juan-based event organizer led by Miguel Rene Deliz, Nuestra Belleza Puerto Rico, Inc., took over the license.

Under the direction of Miss Mundo Puerto Rico, the first representative, Janelee Chaparro, was appointed to join the international contest in Thailand and also won the title. The following two candidates were determined through the Miss World Puerto Rico pageant, which was directed by Delia Cruz.

=== 2016–2026: Miguel Deliz ===
In the early days after acquiring the franchise, most of the country's representatives at Miss Grand International were appointed. Later in 2019, the national pageant of Nuestra Belleza Puerto Rico was created to select the country's representatives for Miss Grand International, Miss International, Miss Supranational, Top Model of the World and Miss Intercontinental. However, the pageant was cancelled in 2020 and 2021 due to the COVID-19 pandemic, and the representatives for the aforementioned international contests were instead determined through the casting process.

From 2022 to 2025, Nuestra Belleza Puerto Rico, Inc. held the Puerto Rican licenses for Miss Grand International, Miss International, Miss Cosmo, Miss Charm, and Miss and Mister Supranational. In 2026, the organization relinquished the Puerto Rican licenses to Miss Grand International, Miss International, and Miss Charm, continuing only with Miss Cosmo and Miss and Mister Supranational.

=== 2027–present: María Felix ===
In late 2026, María Eugenia Félix Paredes, 4th runner-up at Miss Grand International 2024 as Miss Grand Dominican Republic, acquired the franchise. Félix is responsible for selecting and preparing the representative from Puerto Rico, beginning in 2027.

== Titleholders ==
The following is a list of Puerto Rico representatives at Miss Grand International and their placement.

Color keys

- : Declared as Winner
- : Ended as runner-up in Top 5
- : Ended as finalist in Top 10
- : Ended as a semi-finalist in Top 20
- : Ended as a special awards winner

Year	Delegate	Title	Placement	Special awards	National licensee
2027	TBA				María Félix
2026	Vickyani "Vicky" Carbonell Cuevas	Appointed – Miss Grand Puerto Rico 2026	5th Runners-up	Best in Talent	Miguel Deliz
2025	Sarahí Figueroa Colón	Nuestra Belleza Puerto Rico 2025 – Grand International	Unplaced		Miguel Deliz
2024	Mariangie Alicea Figueroa	Nuestra Belleza Puerto Rico 2024 – Grand International	Unplaced		Miguel Deliz
2023	María Cristina Ramos Ayala	Nuestra Belleza Puerto Rico 2023 – Grand International	Top 20		Miguel Deliz
2022	Oxana Isabel Rivera Álvarez	Nuestra Belleza Puerto Rico 2022 – Grand International	5th Runner-Up		Miguel Deliz
2021	Vivianie Díaz Arroyo	Audition – Miss Grand Puerto Rico 2021 (Note: Determined through casting/audition.)	3rd Runner-Up	Best in Swimsuit	Miguel Deliz
2020	Fabiola Krystal Valentín González	Appointed – Miss Grand Puerto Rico 2020	Top 10		Miguel Deliz
2019	Hazel Marie Ortiz Méndez	Nuestra Belleza Puerto Rico 2019 – Grand International	Top 10		Miguel Deliz
2018	Nicole Marie Colón Rivera	Appointed – Miss Grand Puerto Rico 2018	3rd Runner-Up		Miguel Deliz
2017	Brenda Azaria Jiménez Hernández	Appointed – Miss Grand Puerto Rico 2017	3rd Runner-Up		Miguel Deliz
2016	Madison Sara Anderson Berrios	Appointed – Miss Grand Puerto Rico 2016	3rd Runner-Up		Miguel Deliz
2015	Isamar Campos De Jesús	Appointed – Miss Grand Puerto Rico 2015	Top 20		Delia Cruz
2014	Rebeca Valentín García	Appointed – Miss Grand Puerto Rico 2014	Top 20		Delia Cruz
2013	Janelee Marcus Chaparro Colón	Appointed – Miss Grand Puerto Rico 2013	Miss Grand International 2013		Delia Cruz

== Gallery ==
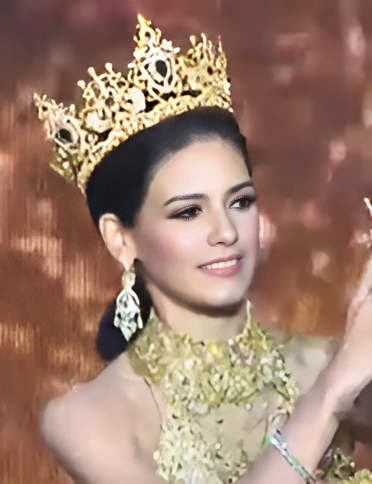
Miss Grand Puerto Rico 2013
Janelee Chaparro

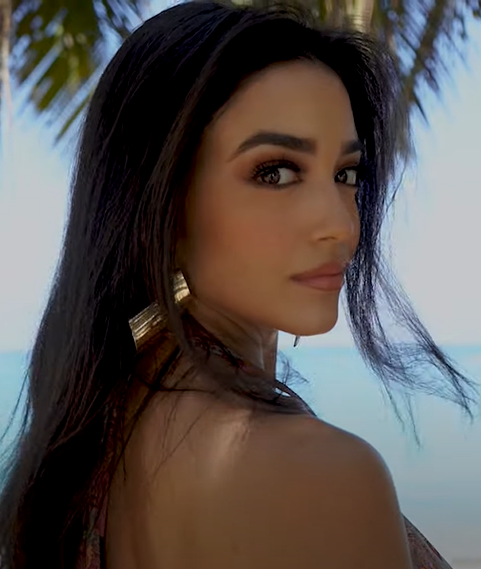
Miss Grand Puerto Rico 2021
Vivianie Arroyo

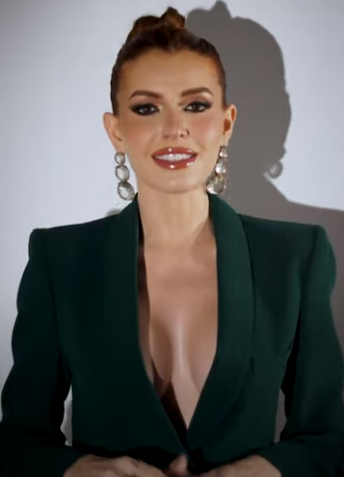
Miss Grand Puerto Rico 2023
María Cristina Ramos

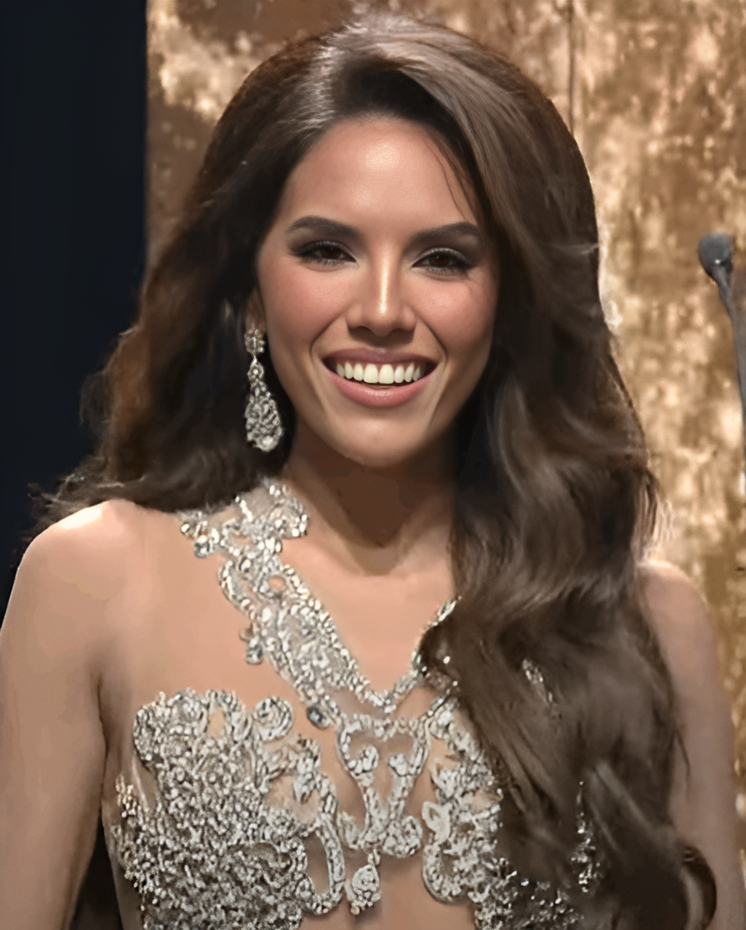
Miss Grand Puerto Rico 2024
Mariangie Alicea

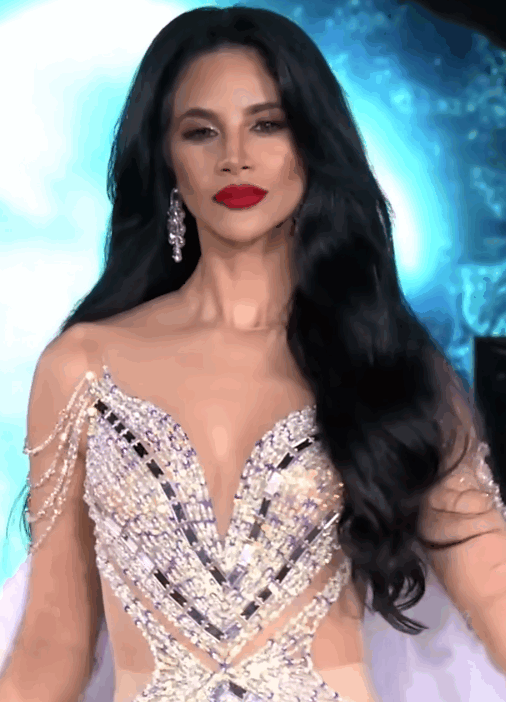
Miss Grand Puerto Rico 2025
Sarahí Figueroa
