= Zuleica Wilson =

Angolan model (born 1993)

- Born: Zuleica Marilha dos Santos Wilson; March 17, 1993 (age 33); Cabinda, Angola
- Height: 5 ft 8 in (1.73 m)
- Beauty pageant titleholder
- Title: Miss Angola 2013
- Hair color: Black
- Major competitions: Miss Angola 2013 (Winner); Miss Universe 2014 (Unplaced)

Zuleica Wilson (born March 17, 1993) is an Angolan model and beauty pageant titleholder who was crowned Miss Angola 2013 and represented her country at the Miss Universe 2014 pageant. She will also represent her country at the Miss Intercontinental 2015 pageant.

== Early life ==
Zuleica is a student business and management at Lusíada University.

== Pageantry ==
Zuleica Wilson was crowned as Miss Angola in 2013. The pageant pageant was held at the Belas Conference Centre, Luanda, Angola.

Wilson participated in Miss Universe 2014, held in Florida, USA, where she represented Angola.

Awards and achievements
Preceded by Vaumara Rebelo	Miss Angola; 2013	Succeeded by Whitney Shikongo
