= Birgite dos Santos =

Angolan model and beauty pageant titleholder

Brigite dos Santos
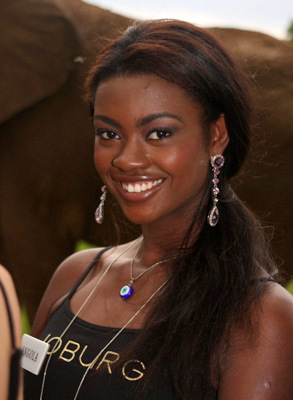
- dos Santos in 2008
- Born: Brigite da Conceição Francisco dos Santos; 1990 (age 35–36); Luanda, Angola
- Beauty pageant titleholder
- Title: Miss Angola 2008; Miss World Africa 2008
- Major competitions: Miss Angola 2008; (Winner); Miss World 2008; (Top 5); (Miss World Africa)

Brigite da Conceição Francisco dos Santos (born 5 October 1989 in Luanda) is an Angolan model and beauty pageant titleholder who was Miss Angola 2008 first runner-up and Miss Angola Mundo 2008. She represented Angola during the Miss World 2008 pageant in South Africa.

She placed among the top five finalists, and was awarded the Miss World Africa title.

| Preceded by Micaela Reis | Miss Angola World; 2007 - 2008 | Succeeded by Jesinalda Silva |
