= Kettly Noël =

Haitian dancer, choreographer and actress

Kettly Noël (born 1966 in Port-au-Prince) is a Haitian dancer, choreographer and actress. Her first choreographed piece, Nanlakou, premiered in 1995. Tichèlbe (2002) won both the Rencontres chorégraphiques d’Afrique et d’océan Indien and RFI Danse prizes. She's the founder and artistic director of the Donko Senko dance studio, Dense Bamako Danse festival, both in Mali, and the Port-au-Prince Art Performance (PAPAP) festival in Haiti. Noël was also noted for her performance in the role of Zabou in Abderrahmane Sissako's 2014 film Timbuktu.

== Works ==
- 1995: Nanlakou
- 2002: Tichèlbè
- 2017: Panser la planète
- 2017: Zombification and Errance, documenta 14 in Athens, Greece and Kassel, Germany

== Prizes ==
- Rencontres chorégraphiques d’Afrique et d’océan Indien, 2003
- RFI Danse, 2003
- Hiroshima Prize, 2014
