= Sophia Osako =

Czech and Japanese beauty pageant titleholder

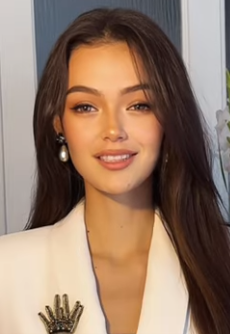
- Sophia in 2023
- Born: Sophia Maria Osako; Břeclav, South Moravia, Czech Republic
- Beauty pageant titleholder
- Title: Miss Grand Czech Republic 2023; Miss Universe Czech Republic 2026
- Major competitions: Miss Czech Republic 2023; (Miss Grand Czech Republic 2023); Miss Grand International 2023; (Top 20); Miss Universe Czech Republic 2026; (Winner)

Sophia Osako is a Czech and Japanese singer, model, and beauty pageant titleholder who was crowned Miss Universe Czech Republic 2026. She previously competed at Miss Grand International 2023 in Vietnam.

== Early life and career ==
Sophia Osako was born in Břeclav, Moravia to a Czech-Moravian mother and a Japanese father.

She is currently studying in the Visual Art Studies program at Anglo-American University.

In 2024, she filmed a music video in Tokyo for a song titled Trippin In Tokyo.

== Pageantry ==
Osako competed in Miss Czech Republic 2023, where she won the title of Miss Grand Czech Republic 2023. She went on to represent the Czech Republic at Miss Grand International 2023 in Vietnam, where she placed in the Top 20.

In 2026, She won Miss Universe Czech Republic 2026, and withdrew from Miss Universe 2026 to focus on her duties as Miss Universe Czech Republic.

Awards and achievements
Preceded by Michaela Tomanová	Miss Universe Czech Republic; 2026	Incumbent
Preceded by Mariana Bečková	Miss Grand Czech Republic; 2022	Succeeded by Veronica Biasiol
