= Nelsa Alves =

Angolan model (born 1987)

- Born: Nelsa Suraia Pombal Alves; 6 July 1987 (age 39); Luanda, Angola
- Modeling information
- Hair color: Black
- Eye color: Black

Nelsa Alves (born 6 July 1987) is an Angolan model and beauty pageant titleholder who was the competitor at Miss Universe 2009. She won the title of Miss Ingombota on her debut as a model, and subsequently sought to promote good causes.

== Early life ==
Nelsa Suraia Pombal Alves was in the Angolan city of Luanda.

== Pageant career ==
Alves made her catwalk debut at the Miss Ingombota competition in 2009. She had never dreamed of becoming a model, but applied to gain some experience after the encouragement of family and friends. The competition was her modelling debut. She was successful, winning the title and subsequently the title of Miss Luanda, making her eligible to be one of the 24 competitors for the title of Miss Angola 2009.

At the pageant in December 2008, held at the Atlântico cinema, she was named Miss Angola and the successor to Lesliana Pereira. Her prize package included a Volkswagen Gol, $3000 and a white gold diamond ring. This victory qualified Alves for the following Miss Universe competition.

=== Miss Universe 2009 ===
Alves travelled to the Bahamas to be with the other competitors for Miss Universe 2009 around a month prior to the start of the competition, with the aim to build a rapport with the other competitors and organisers, and find motivation to win. In a press release, the Miss Angola Committee wished Alves luck, and hoped that she would better the sixth place achieved in Miss Universe 2006 by Micaela Reis. Alves failed to place in the top fifteen competitors.

== Event and modelling work ==
Following the competition, she stressed in interviews that she did not see modelling as her future profession. However, she felt that she could support certain events through attending in this capacity. Alves has supported the campaigns of health organisations such as the Brazilian National Cancer Institute, which ran a campaign in 2009 in which companies customised Smart Fortwo cars. Alves was one of those promoting the campaign at launch, alongside Daniela Escobar, Caroline Bittencourt and fellow Miss Universe competitor Larissa Costa.
