= Imanni Da Silva =

Angolan model, artist, activist (born 1981)

- Born: 1981 (age 44–45); Luanda
- Occupations: Model, artist, activist
- Years active: 2012 to today
- Awards: Personality of the Year - Queer People Awards (2023)

Imanni da Silva (born 1981) is an Angolan model, human rights activist and visual artist, who is the first transgender model from the African continent. She has competed in several beauty pageants, and now is also a judge in them. In 2023 she was awarded 'Personality of the Year' in the Queer People Awards.

== Career ==
Da Silva is a model, artist and human rights activist, who is considered the first transgender model on the African continent. She has competed in a range of beauty contests, such as competing in the Miss International Queen in Thailand in 2012. In 2018, Da Silva was a contestant in the Super Sireyna Worldwide, where she was placed 1st Runner-Up. She was a judge for Miss Grand Angola 2023. She was the inaugural winner of 'Personality of the Year' at the Queer People Awards in 2023.

In 2018, Da Silva opened her first solo art exhibition, which addressed women as the creative centre of the fifteen paintings on display. In 2022 she was a contributing artist to the exhibition Expressão Feminina which took place at the Brazilian Cultural Centre in Angola.

Da Silva has been outspoken about the impact of the transphobic attacks she has suffered throughout her career; she is an active voice advocating against violence, including physical violence, suffered by transgender people, both in Angola and elsewhere. She leads the Angolan transgender rights movement Movimento Eu Sou Trans, which was founded on 31 March 2019. She has also spoken out on how transgender people are hypersexualised by many societies, and links this sexualisation with social disrespect.

== Personal life ==
Da Silva began her gender transition in 2007 with hormone therapy, and in 2011 she underwent gender-affirming surgery in England.
