= Eugénia das Neves =

Angolan beauty pageant titleholder

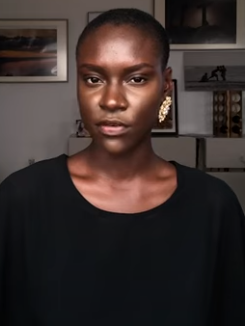
- das Neves in 2023
- Born: Luanda, Angola
- Beauty pageant titleholder
- Title: Miss Grand Angola 2023; Miss Angola Universo 2027
- Major competitions: Miss Grand Angola 2023; (Winner); Miss Grand International 2023; (5th Runner-Up); Miss Angola 2026; (Winner); Miss Universe 2027; (TBD)

Eugénia das Neves is an Angolan beauty pageant titleholder who won Miss Angola 2026, and will represent Angola at Miss Universe 2027. She previously competed at Miss Grand International 2023, where she was fifth runner-up.

== Early life and education ==
Eugénia das Neves is from Luanda, Angola. She is a Mechatronics Engineering student.

== Personal life ==
Das Neves is engaged to Carlos Guilherme Rodrigues. Together, they founded the modeling agency Grand Models.

== Pageantry ==
In September 2023, das Neves represented Luanda and won Miss Grand Angola 2023. She subsequently represented Angola and was fifth runner-up at Miss Grand International 2023, held in Ho Chi Minh City, Vietnam.

In October 2026, das Neves represented Uíge and won Miss Angola 2026. She will represent Angola at Miss Universe 2027.

Awards and achievements
Preceded by Wanderléia Rodrigues	Miss Angola; 2026	Incumbent
Preceded by none	Miss Grand Angola; 2023	Succeeded by Nacira Amaral
