= Isménia Júnior =

Angolan model

Isménia Júnior (born 1985) is an Angolan model and beauty pageant titleholder who won Miss Angola 2006 and represented her country at Miss Universe 2006.

Her interests include cooking, dance, music, sports, and reading. Growing up in Cabinda, she stands at 5' 8" and admires former South African President Nelson Mandela.

Preceded by Zenilde Laurinda Josias	Miss Angola; 2005 - 2006	Succeeded by Micaela Reis
