= Run (2014 film) =

2014 film

- Directed by: Philippe Lacôte
- Written by: Philippe Lacôte
- Produced by: Claire Gadea; Ernest Kouamé
- Starring: Abdoul Karim Konaté; Bienvenue Koffi
- Cinematography: Daniel Miller
- Edited by: Barbara Bossuet
- Music by: Sebastian Escoffet
- Distributed by: BAC Films
- Release dates: 17 May 2014 (Cannes); 17 December 2014 (France)
- Running time: 100 minutes
- Countries: France; Ivory Coast
- Language: French

Run is a 2014 French-Ivorian drama film directed by Philippe Lacôte. It was screened in the Un Certain Regard section at the 2014 Cannes Film Festival. The fictionalized account of the 2011 post-election upheaval in the Ivory Coast that killed 3000 people was first film from that country selected for Cannes.

The film was also selected as the Ivorian entry for the Best Foreign Language Film at the 88th Academy Awards but it was not nominated. It received 12 nominations at the 11th Africa Movie Academy Awards but did not win any award.

== Cast ==
- Abdoul Karim Konaté as Run
- Isaach de Bankolé as Assa
- Djinda Kane as Claire

== See also ==
- List of submissions to the 88th Academy Awards for Best Foreign Language Film
- List of Ivorian submissions for the Academy Award for Best Foreign Language Film
