= Miss Grand Seychelles =

Seychelles beauty pageant title

- Formation: 2014
- Type: Beauty pageant
- Headquarters: Seychelles
- Location: Victoria
- Members: Miss Grand International
- Official language: English; French
- Director: Gabriella Gonthier
- Parent organization: Seychelles Pageantry Association (2023–present)

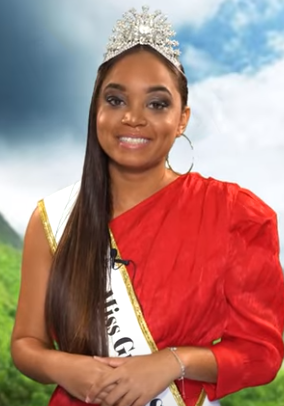
Shaniah Dick, Miss Grand Seychelles 2023

Miss Grand Seychelles is a national beauty pageant title awarded to Seychelles representatives who were elected to compete at the Miss Grand International pageant. The title was first awarded in 2014 to a Sino-Seychellois model, Linda Cui, followed by a diploma student from Mahé, Shaniah Dick, in 2023.

Since the establishment of Miss Grand International, Seychelles only participated once in 2023, and the remaining representative withdrew. The first contest of Miss Grand Seychelles is scheduled to be held in 2024.

== History ==
Initially, Seychelles was expected to make its debut in Miss Grand International in 2014 by the appointed representative, Linda Nan Cui, but Linda did not enter the international contest in Thailand for undisclosed reasons.

Later in 2023, the licence of Miss Grand Seychelles was taken by a newly established pageant organiser, the Seychelles Pageantry Association, with Gabriella Gonthier as the director and Jouel Boutique as the sponsor. The audition to select the country representative for Miss Grand International 2023 was then arranged on 5 August. Four candidates qualified for the final round, and Shaniah Dick, a diploma student in social work from the National Institute of Health and Social Studies (NIHSS), was named the winner; however, Shaniah received a non-placement after partaking in the international pageant in Vietnam.

Initially, the Seychelles Pageantry Association also planned to organise a contest in 2024 to elect their representative for Miss Grand International 2024, but was cancelled for undisclosed reasons.

== International competition ==
The following is a list of Seychelles representatives at the Miss Grand International contest.

Year	Representative	Original national title	Result		National director
Year	Representative	Original national title	Placement	Other awards	National director
2014	Linda Cui	Miss Universe China 2014 Finalist	Did not compete		Self-dominated
No representatives from 2015 to 2022
2023	Shaniah Dick	—N/a	Unplaced	—	Gabriella Gonthier
No representatives since 2024
