= Toulou Kiki =

Nigerien actress and singer (born 1983)

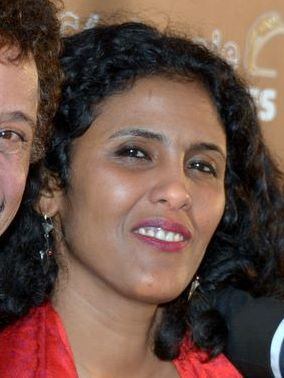
- Born: January 1, 1983 (age 43); Niger
- Occupations: Actress, Singer
- Known for: Timbuktu

Toulou Kiki is a Nigerien actress and singer. She was nominated for an Africa Movie Academy Award for Best Actress in a Supporting Role for her role in Timbuktu.

== Career ==
In 2014, she played "Satima" in Timbuktu. The role got her a best supporting actress nomination at the 11th Africa Movie Academy Awards. She eventually lost out the award to Hilda Dokubo.
