= Wanderléia Rodrigues =

Angolan beauty pageant titleholder

- Rodrigues in 2025
- Born: Luanda Province, Angola
- Beauty pageant titleholder
- Title: Miss Cuanza Norte 2025; Miss Angola 2025
- Major competition: Miss Angola 2025 (Winner)

Wanderléia Rodrigues is an Angolan beauty pageant titleholder who won Miss Angola 2025, and will compete in Miss Universe 2027.

== Early life and education ==
Wanderléia Rodrigues was born in Luanda Province and raised in Cuanza Norte Province.

== Pageantry ==
On 20 September 2025, Rodrigues won Miss Cuanza Norte, and subsequently won Miss Angola Universe. She became Angola's representative to Miss Universe 2026, in November 2026 in San Juan, Puerto Rico. She withdrew from the competition due to travel restrictions, and will compete in Miss Universe 2027 instead.

Awards and achievements
Preceded by Maria Cunha	Miss Angola; 2025	Succeeded by Eugénia das Neves
