= Erica Chissapa =

Angolan actress and journalist

- Born: Érica Sofia de Jesus Chissapa Bicho; December 22, 1988 (age 37); Huambo, Angola
- Occupations: Actress, journalist, reporter, TV host
- Years active: 2004–present
- Notable work: Njinga: Queen of Angola

Érica Sofia de Jesus Chissapa Bicho (born 22 December 1988), popularly known as Erica Chissapa, is an Angolan actress and journalist. She is best known for the roles in the films Njinga: Queen of Angola, Voo Directo and Jikulumessu.

== Personal life ==
She was born on 22 December 1988 in Huambo, in the Central Angolan Plateau. Later she moved to Luanda when she was just two years old and lived with her godparents, leaving her parents and three brothers in her homeland.

== Career ==
At the age of 14, Erica entered the theater dramas. While she was in rehearsals of a theater group in Luanda, she was invited to replace one of the actresses in the play, which was due to open three days later. Then she moved to television serials under the invitation by actor Orlando Sérgio. However, she did not pass its first test. Later she passed a selection for a miniseries, but unfortunately the production was canceled after only two chapters recorded. However, she continued to make appearances in Angolan theater with the theater group 'Henriques Artes'.

In 2005, she acted in the soap opera Sede de Viver and played the protagonist role 'Kátia'. With the success of the soapie, she was invited to act the main role in the Brazil–Angola co-production Minha Terra Minha Mãe. In 2010, she acted in the Portuguese–Angolan television serial Voo Directo. In the series, Érica played the role of the flight attendant 'Weza Oliveira'. In 2014, she was invited to join the soap opera Jikulumessu by the singer Coréon Dú.

== Filmography ==
| Year | Film | Role | Genre | Ref. |
|---|---|---|---|---|
| 2004 | Black and White Lives | Lígia | TV series | |
| 2005 | Sede de Viver | Kátia | TV series | |
| 2008 | Minha Terra Minha Mãe | Teresinha | TV series | |
| 2010 | Voo Directo | Weza | TV series | |
| 2014 | Njinga: Queen of Angola | Kifunji | Film | |
| 2014 | Jikulumessu | Ruth Capala | TV series | |
| 2014 | Njinga, Rainha de Angola | Kifunji | TV series | |
