= Miss Grand International 2023 =

11th Miss Grand International Competition, beauty pageant edition

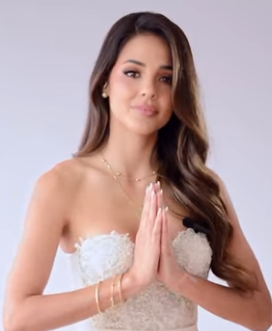
- Luciana Fuster
- Date: 25 October 2023
- Presenters: Matthew Deane
- Entertainment: Engfa Waraha
- Venue: Phú Thọ Indoor Stadium, Ho Chi Minh City, Vietnam
- Broadcaster: YouTube
- Entrants: 69
- Placements: 20
- Debuts: Bonaire; Gibraltar; Seychelles; Trinidad and Tobago; Uzbekistan
- Withdrawals: Bangladesh; China; Crimea; Curaçao; Jamaica; Mauritius; Mongolia; Mozambique; Pakistan; Portugal; Sri Lanka; Uganda
- Returns: Albania; Egypt; Greece; Kosovo; Romania; Switzerland; Taiwan; United States Virgin Islands
- Winner: Luciana Fuster; Peru
- Best National Costume: Yayoi Machida (Japan); Boma Dokubo (Nigeria); Hoàng Phương Lê (Vietnam)
- Best in Swimsuit: Skarxi Marte (Dominican Republic)
- Best in Evening Gown: Anastasiia Volkonskaia (Russia)

Miss Grand International 2023 was the 11th Miss Grand International pageant, held at the Phú Thọ Indoor Stadium in Ho Chi Minh City, Vietnam, on 25 October 2023.

At the end of the event, Isabella Menin of Brazil crowned Luciana Fuster of Peru as Miss Grand International 2023, marking the country's second victory in the pageant's history.

Contestants from sixty-nine countries and territories competed in this year's pageant. The pageant's grand final round was hosted by Thai television personality Matthew Deane, and featured a live performance by Miss Grand International 2022 first runner-up, Engfa Waraha.

== Background ==
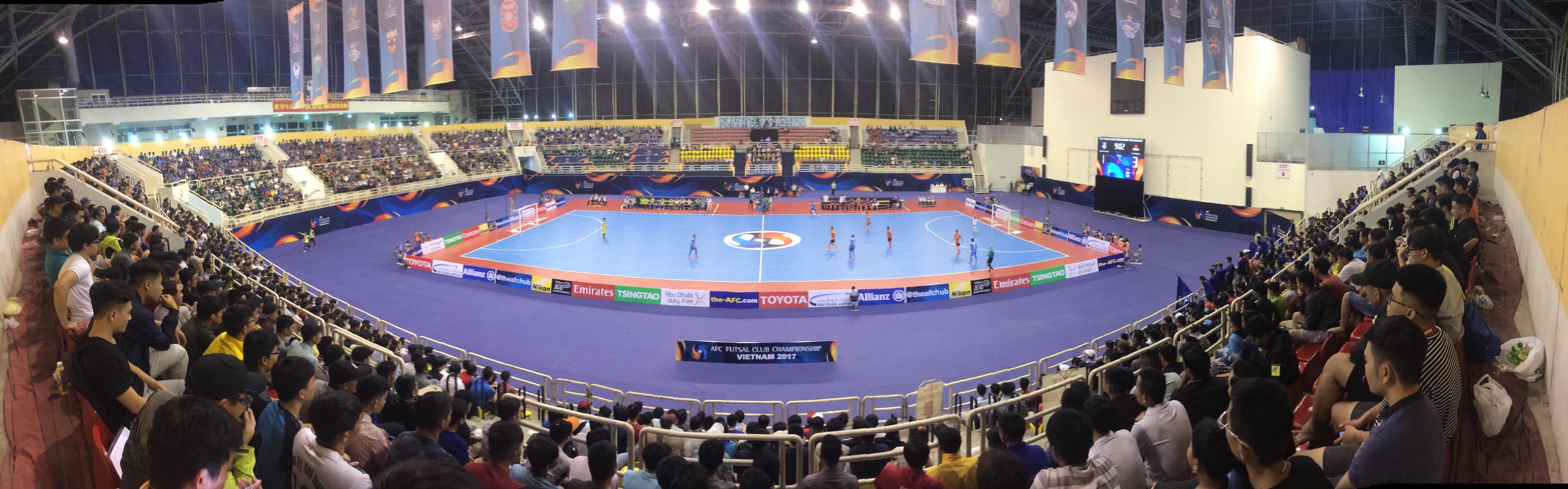
Phú Thọ Indoor Stadium, the venue of the pageant.

=== Location and date ===
On 25 June 2022, the organizer of the Miss Grand International pageant, MGI PCL, announced on their official social media that the 11th edition of the contest was scheduled to be held in Vietnam on 25 October 2023. This will be the second time for Vietnam to host the contest; the first was in 2017 at the Vinpearl Convention Center on Phú Quốc island. The memorandum of understanding signing ceremony between the MGI PCL and the local organizer Sen Vàng Entertainment for the agreement to organize the contest later took place during the press conference of the inaugural edition of Miss Grand Vietnam contest at Sofitel Saigon plaza in Ho Chi Minh City on 7 June 2022, with an international press release at the Saigon South Marina Club on 5 July.

At an additional press conference held on 5 February 2023, it was announced that the pageant would consist of six main sub-events; a best in swimsuit contest, the Vietnam Beauty Fashion Fest, a closed-door interview, a national costume contest, the preliminary competition, and the grand final coronation night, with eventsin cities including Hanoi, Hạ Long, Da Nang, Hội An, Huế, and Ho Chi Minh City, from 3–25 October.

=== Selection of participants ===
Contestants from sixty-nine countries and territories were selected to compete in the competition. Forty-three of these were selected through their respective national pageants, four were appointed having been runners-up in their national pageants, or were selected through a casting process, twenty-three were appointed to the title without participating in any national pageant. The original representatives of Ecuador, India, Portugal, and Trinidad and Tobago were unable to compete for various reasons, which caused their national directors to promote the runners-up to the title or assign other participants as replacements.

At this competition, six countries were expected to debut. Eleven countries that competed at the 10th edition withdrew due to a lack of national licensees, and eight countries returned to the competition after being absent in previous contests. Initially, seventy-four country and territory franchises confirmed that they would send their candidates to Vietnam. Those that did not compete were Equatorial Guinea (failed to appoint a delegate), Miss Grand Guadeloupe (unknown reasons), Miss Grand South Sudan (visa problems), Miss Grand Sri Lanka (family death), and Miss Grand Portugal (refused to participate).

== Results ==
=== Placements ===
Placement	Contestant
Miss Grand International 2023	Peru – Luciana Fuster
1st Runner-Up	Myanmar – Ni Ni Lin Eain ‡ §
2nd Runner-Up	Colombia – María Alejandra López
3rd Runner-Up	United States – Sthephanie Miranda
4th Runner-Up	Vietnam – Hoàng Phương Lê
5th Runners-Up	Angola – Eugénia das Neves; Dominican Republic – Skarxi Marte; Indonesia – Ritassya Wellgreat; Netherlands – Melissa Bottema; Thailand – Thaweeporn Phingchamrat
Top 20	Czech Republic – Sophia Osako; France – Clémence Drouhaud; Honduras – Britthany Marroquín; India – Arshina Sumbul; Laos – Phetmany Philakhong; Nigeria – Boma Dokubo; Puerto Rico – Cristina Ramos; Spain – Celia Sevilla; Ukraine – Yulia Klimenko; Uzbekistan – Amaliya Shakirova

§ – Voted into the Top 10 by viewers and awarded as Miss Popular Vote
‡ – Voted into the Top 20 by viewers and awarded as Country's Power of the Year

=== Special awards ===
Award	Contestant
Best in Evening Gown	Russia – Anastasiia Volkonskaia
Best in Swimsuit	Dominican Republic – Skarxi Marte
Best National Costume	Japan – Yayoi Machida; Nigeria – Boma Dokubo; Vietnam – Hoàng Phương Lê
Country's Power of the Year	Myanmar – Ni Ni Lin Eain
Grand Voice Award	Ghana – Kitava-Yvettlana Amankwaa
Miss Popular Vote	Myanmar – Ni Ni Lin Eain

== Ancillary events ==
=== Fan vote ===
On 28 September 2023, one week before the pageant schedule, pre-arrival voting on the organizer's Facebook and Instagram pages was launched. The five contestants with the most scores, calculated by the number of likes and shares on their portrait photos posted on the mentioned social media platforms, acquired the right to be present at the exclusive dinner with the pageant president, Nawat Itsaragrisil, and the vice president, Teresa Chaivisut, on October 4, at the Grand K Hotel Suites Hanoi.

Another voting challenge with the same strategy, Best in Áo dài, was started after the end of the first voting event, in which the contestants were divided into three geographical groups namely Asia & Oceania, Europe & Africa, and America & Latin America. Two winners of each group obtained the right to have a special talk with the pageant's director at the Citadines Marina Halong, Hạ Long, on 8 October.

Pre-arrival voting winners
- Brazil – Adriana Yanca
- Colombia – María López
- Indonesia – Ritassya Wellgreat
- Myanmar – Ni Ni Lin Eain
- Vietnam – Hoàng Phương Lê

Best in Áo dài
- Czech Republic – Sophia Osako
- Nigeria – Boma Dokubo
- Myanmar – Ni Ni Lin Eain
- Peru – Luciana Fuster
- Thailand – Thaweeporn Phingchamrat
- Venezuela – Valentina Martínez

=== Country's Power of the Year challenge ===
The Country's Power of the Year award returned after being introduced for the first time in 2020, with fans able to vote for delegates to advance to the Top 20 through Instagram and Facebook. All candidates were divided into ten groups for the first round. The voting took place on the pageant's Instagram and Facebook accounts where the photos to vote for were presented for one group per day. The Top 2 of each group advanced to the second round, in which the qualified candidates were randomly categorized into four groups of five and the vote was launched again with the same procedure. The winner of each group in the second round qualified for the third round where they were divided into two groups of two. The winner of each of these two groups will have competed against each other in the final voting round and the winner automatically be part of the Top 20.

Placement	Contestant
Winner	Myanmar - Ni Ni Lin Eain
Runner-up	Vietnam - Hoàng Phương Lê
Top 4	Peru - Luciana Fuster; Thailand - Thaweeporn Phingchamrat
Top 20	Brazil - Adriana Yanca; Cambodia - Sreyno Phoem; Colombia - María López; Czech Republic - Sophia Osako; El Salvador - Fátima Calderón; Ghana - Kitava-Yvettlana Amankwaa; India - Arshina Sumbul; Indonesia - Ritassya Wellgreat; Malaysia - Kash Bhullar; Mexico - Fernanda Beltrán; Nigeria - Boma Dokubo; Panama - Julia Leong; Paraguay - Maelia Salcines; Puerto Rico - Cristina Ramos; United States - Sthephanie Miranda; Venezuela - Valentina Martínez

=== Grand Voice contest ===
The audition round of the Grand Voice Award singing contest is scheduled for 14 October 2023, at the Nami Beach Club – Mikazuki Japanese Resort and Spa in Da Nang. About 40 delegates applied for the audition round, and 18 of them qualified for the second round, in which the final-five candidates were elected through an event held on 17 October 2023, at the Kobi Onsen Resort in Huế. The last five contestants competed again on the preliminary night held on 22 October at the Phú Thọ Indoor Stadium, Ho Chi Minh City, and the winner was announced on the grand final stage on 25 October.

Placement	Contestant
Winner	Ghana - Kitava-Yvettlana Amankwaa
Top 5	Germany - Marie Kilonzo; Japan - Yayoi Machida; Nigeria - Boma Dokubo; Singapore - Jade Wu
Top 18	Angola - Eugénia das Neves; Chile - Paula Henríquez; Czech Republic - Sophia Osako; Indonesia - Ritassya Wellgreat; Ireland - Rachel Slawson; Laos - Phetmany Philakhong; Myanmar - Ni Ni Lin Eain; Netherlands - Melissa Bottema; Peru - Luciana Fuster; Poland - Kornelia Golebiewska; South Africa - Gugulethu Mayisela; Thailand - Thaweeporn Phingchamrat; Vietnam - Hoàng Phương Lê

=== Best in Swimsuit ===
The Best in Swimsuit contest was organized at the Da Nang Mikazuki Japanese Resorts & Spa on 12 October 2023; however, due to contestants falling due to wearing high heels in a rainstorm, the contest was held again as the indoor event on 14 October 2023. The challenge's qualified finalists were elected through both the public vote and directly chosen by the panel of judges. The winner of which was announced in the pageant grand final held on 25 October.

Results	Contestant
Best in Swimsuit	Dominican Republic - Skarxi Marte
Top 10	Bolivia - Victoria Olguín; Brazil - Adriana Yanca; Cambodia - Sreyno Phoem; Colombia - María López; Guatemala - Raschel Paz; Indonesia - Ritassya Wellgreat; Myanmar - Ni Ni Lin Eain; Peru - Luciana Fuster; Thailand - Thaweeporn Phingchamrat; Vietnam - Hoàng Phương Lê

=== Best National Costume ===
The Best National Costume Contest was organized at the Phú Thọ Indoor Stadium, Ho Chi Minh City, on 20 October 2023. The top 20, top 10, and top 6 qualified costumes were determined through both public vote and the judges' selection; however, the winning costumes was directly elected by the panel of judges from the top 6 final costumes and was later announced on the grand final stage on 25 October.

The event was hosted by Mister Eco International Thailand 2018, Sakul Limpapanon, and Miss Grand Philippines 2022, Roberta Tamondong. The panel of judges includes the president of Miss Grand International Nawat Itsaragrisil, vice president of Miss Grand International Teresa Chaivisut, Miss Grand International 2022 Isabella Menin, and Miss Grand International 2021 Nguyễn Thúc Thùy Tiên.

Results	Selection	Contestant
Best National Costume		Japan - Yayoi Machida; Nigeria - Boma Dokubo; Vietnam - Hoàng Phương Lê
Top 10	Vote	Cambodia - Sreyno Phoem; Indonesia - Ritassya Wellgreat; Myanmar - Ni Ni Lin Eain; Thailand - Thaweeporn Phingchamrat
Top 10	Judges	Honduras - Britthany Marroquín; Puerto Rico - Cristina Ramos; Russia - Anastasiia Volkonskaia
Top 20	Vote	Bolivia - Victoria Olguín; Guatemala - Raschel Paz; Panama - Julia Leong; Peru - Luciana Fuster; Philippines - Nikki de Moura
Top 20	Judges	Ecuador - Andrea Ojeda; India - Arshina Sumbul; Paraguay - Maelia Salcines; Trinidad and Tobago - Rebekah Hislop; Turkey - Beyhan Kubra

== Pageant ==
=== Format ===
As previously done in 2022, twenty semi-finalists were selected to continue in the competition. The results of the preliminary competition — which consisted of the swimsuit competition, the evening gown competition, the closed-door interviews, and other pageant activities determined the nineteen semi-finalists who advanced in the first cut. The winner of the Country of the Year award, determined through public voting, completed the twenty semi-finalists, who then competed at the swimsuit competition. Afterward, nine semi-finalists, including the winner of the Miss Popular vote which was determined through public voting, completed the ten semi-finalists that later competed at the evening gown and speech competitions. Then, five finalists were chosen to compete at the question and answer portion where the winner and the first to fourth runners-up were determined. The remainder of the ten semi-finalists were enthroned as fifth runners-up.

=== Selection committee ===
Preliminary competition

- Tim Dương — Staynex's CEO and the MGI 2023 official partner
- Hà Kiều Anh — Miss Vietnam 1992
- Hoàng Thanh Nga — Mrs. Vietnam 2022
- Nguyễn Thị Như Lan — Vietnamese businesswoman
- Phạm Kim Dung — Miss Grand Vietnam national director
- Teresa Chaivisut — Vice president Miss Grand International PCL
- Nawat Itsaragrisil — President Miss Grand International PCL
- Isabella Menin — Miss Grand International 2022 from Brazil
- Nguyễn Thúc Thùy Tiên — Miss Grand International 2021 from Vietnam

Final competition

- Hà Kiều Anh — Miss Vietnam 1992
- Hoàng Thanh Nga — Mrs. Vietnam 2022
- Nguyễn Thị Như Lan — Vietnamese businesswoman

== Contestants ==
Sixty-nine contestants competed for the title.

Country/Territory	Contestant	Age (Note: Ages at the time of the pageant)	Hometown
Albania	Angela Tanuzi	20	Krujë
Angola	Eugénia das Neves	24	Luanda
Argentina	Natalia Carolina Cometto	28	Pirané
Australia	Mikaela-Rose Fowler	28	Mornington
Belarus	Ekaterina Agapava	27	Murmansk
Belgium	Albertina Rodrigues	25	Liège
Bolivia	Victoria Olguín	24	Cochabamba
Bonaire	Ruby Pouchet	28	Kralendijk
Brazil	Adriana Yanca	26	Rio de Janeiro
Cambodia	Sreyno Phoem	25	Phnom Penh
Canada	Yuliya Shcherban	22	Lloydminster
Chile	Paula Henríquez	27	Las Condes
Colombia	María López	29	Pereira
Costa Rica	Kristell Freeman	26	Limón
Cuba	Sofía Acosta	27	Miami
Czech Republic	Sophia Osako	19	Břeclav
Denmark	Sille Albertsen	20	Næstved
Dominican Republic	Skarxi Marte	21	Santo Domingo
Ecuador	Andrea Ojeda	25	Guayaquil
Egypt	Mariam Khatab	25	Cairo
El Salvador	Fátima Calderón	24	San Salvador
France	Clémence Drouhaud	19	Angoulême
Germany	Marie Kilonzo	28	Bonn
Ghana	Kitava-Yvettlana Amankwaa	28	Accra
Gibraltar	Jaylynn Cruz	27	Gibraltar
Greece	Ioanna Skoula	18	Heraklion
Guatemala	Raschel Paz	22	Guatemala City
Haiti	Isnaida Compère	26	Artibonite
Honduras	Britthany Marroquín	20	Copán
Hong Kong	Ada Lo	28	Hong Kong
India	Arshina Sumbul	24	Jaipur
Indonesia	Ritassya Wellgreat	22	Palembang
Ireland	Rachel Slawson	28	Provo
Italy	Andrea Zanettin	24	Asti
Japan	Yayoi Machida	26	Tokyo
Kosovo	Rinesa Murati	18	Pristina
Laos	Phetmany Philakhong	27	Vientiane
Malaysia	Kash Bhullar	21	Selangor
Mexico	Fernanda Beltrán	23	Culiacán
Myanmar	Ni Ni Lin Eain	23	Mudon
Nepal	Garima Ghimire	21	Biratnagar
Netherlands	Melissa Bottema	23	Winsum
Nicaragua	Glennys Medina	28	Rivas
Nigeria	Boma Dokubo	27	Bayelsa
Panama	Julia Leong	26	La Chorrera
Paraguay	Maelia Salcines	29	Fernando de la Mora
Peru	Luciana Fuster	24	Callao
Philippines	Nikki de Moura	19	Cagayan de Oro
Poland	Kornelia Golebiewska	23	Olsztyn
Puerto Rico	Cristina Ramos	26	Caguas
Romania	Denisse Vivienne Andor	28	Bistrița
Russia	Anastasiia Volkonskaia	28	Kursk
Seychelles	Shaniah Dick	19	Mahé
Singapore	Jade Wu	24	Singapore
South Africa	Gugulethu Mayisela	19	Johannesburg
South Korea	Ji-young Park	24	Seoul
Spain	Celia Sevilla	22	Albacete
Switzerland	Marine Sayard	24	Geneva
Taiwan	Erica Xiao Ting	20	Taipei
Thailand	Thaweeporn Phingchamrat	27	Tha Yang
Trinidad and Tobago	Rebekah Hislop	28	Saint Joseph
Turkey	Beyhan Kubra	28	Istanbul
Ukraine	Yulia Klimenko	19	Kyiv
United Kingdom	Chloe Ellman-Baker	23	Sussex
United States	Sthephanie Miranda	29	Campbell
United States Virgin Islands	Heather Marie Thompson	26	New York City
Uzbekistan	Amaliya Shakirova	28	Tashkent
Venezuela	Valentina Martínez	23	Puerto La Cruz
Vietnam	Hoàng Phương Lê	27	Cam Ranh

=== Debuts ===
- Bonaire
- Gibraltar
- Seychelles
- Trinidad and Tobago
- Uzbekistan

=== Returns ===
Last competed in 2014:

- Greece

Last competed in 2016:

- Switzerland

Last competed in 2018:

- Taiwan
- United States Virgin Islands

Last competed in 2019:

- Romania

Last competed in 2020:

- Albania
- Kosovo

Last competed in 2021:

- Egypt

=== Withdrawals ===
- Bangladesh
- China
- Crimea
- Curacao
- Jamaica
- Mauritius
- Mongolia
- Mozambique
- Pakistan
- Uganda
