= Philippe Lacôte =

Ivorian film producer and film director

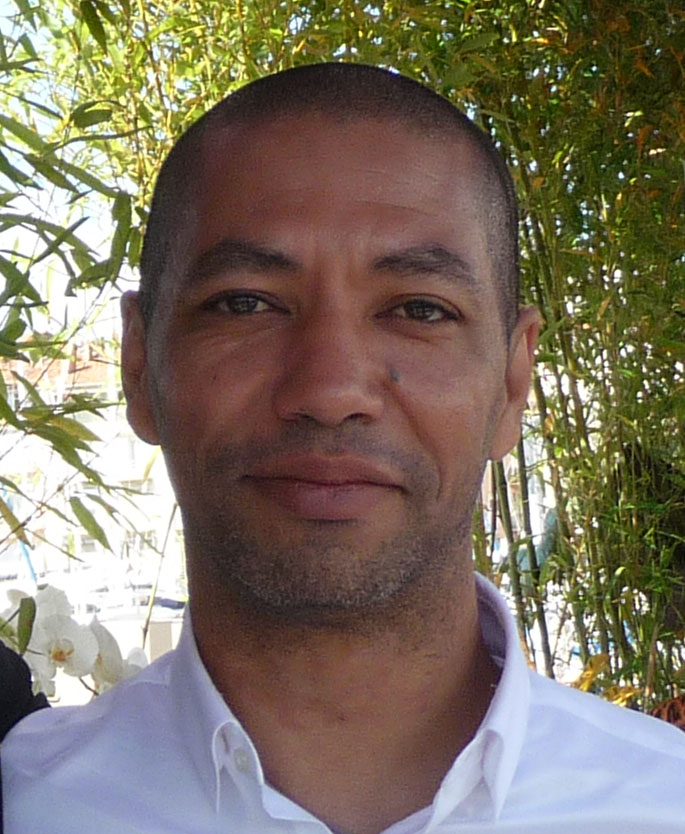
- Philippe Lacôte in 2014
- Citizenship: Ivorian
- Occupation: Film director
- Known for: Run, Screen Daily, Night of the Kings
- Awards: Run for the 88th Academy Awards in 2016 and Night of the Kings for the 93rd Academy Awards in 2021

Philippe Lacôte is an Ivorian film director. He is most noted for his 2014 film Run, which was a Lumière Award nominee for Best French-Language Film at the 20th Lumière Awards, and his 2020 film Night of the Kings (La Nuit des rois), which won the Amplify Voices Award at the 2020 Toronto International Film Festival.

Both films were also selected as Côte d'Ivoire's submissions to the Academy Awards for the Best International Feature Film at the 88th Academy Awards in 2016 and at the 93rd Academy Awards in 2021, respectively.

In 2024, Lacote directed the film Killer Heat, based on Jo Nesbø's The Jealousy Man and Other Stories, and starring Joseph Gordon-Levitt, Shailene Woodley and Richard Madden.

== Accolades ==
In 2021, he was selected as a jury member for the International competition section of the 74th Locarno Film Festival, held from August 4 to 14.
