= Miss Angola =

National beauty pageant competition in Angola

Comité Miss Angola
- Formation: 1997; 29 years ago
- Headquarters: Luanda
- Location: Angola
- Official language: Portuguese
- National Director: Leila Lopes
- Affiliations: Miss Universe

Miss Angola is a national beauty pageant in Angola. The pageant was founded in 1997 where the winners were sent to Miss Universe. In 2022 the brand of Miss Angola also used the name of Miss Angola Universo or Miss Universo Angola, this is the organization's name for the Miss Universe competition.

The organization of Miss Angola has produced one Miss Universe winner; Leila Lopes of Benguela Province was crowned Miss Universe 2011, becoming the first black African to win Miss Universe since 1999.

== History ==
Miss Angola was first founded in 1997 under the directorship of Ana Paula Lemos dos Santos, as the sole Angolan franchise owner to Miss World and Miss Universe. Within its first decade of competing internationally, Miss Angola had amassed six placements across the two pageants. In 2011, Leila Lopes was crowned Miss Universe 2011, becoming the first Angolan woman to win a major international pageant. In 2022, Lopes acquired the Miss Universe franchise license in Angola.

=== Miss Universe 2011 ===
On 12 September 2011, Miss Angola 2010, Leila Lopes was crowned Miss Universe in São Paulo, Brazil, receiving the title from the former Miss Universe Ximena Navarrete of Mexico. She is currently the 60th Miss Universe titleholder, and is the first Angolan woman to hold the position. Lopes is the 5th woman of African descent to win the title since the beginning of the worldwide pageant (following Miss Trinidad and Tobago in 1977, Miss USA in 1995, Miss Trinidad and Tobago again in 1998, and Miss Botswana in 1999) and the fourth African woman from the African continent to win following Mpule Kwelagobe, Miss Universe 1999 from Botswana.

=== Directorships ===
- Ana Paula Lemos dos Santos (1997-2019)
- Leila Lopes (2022―present)

== Formats ==
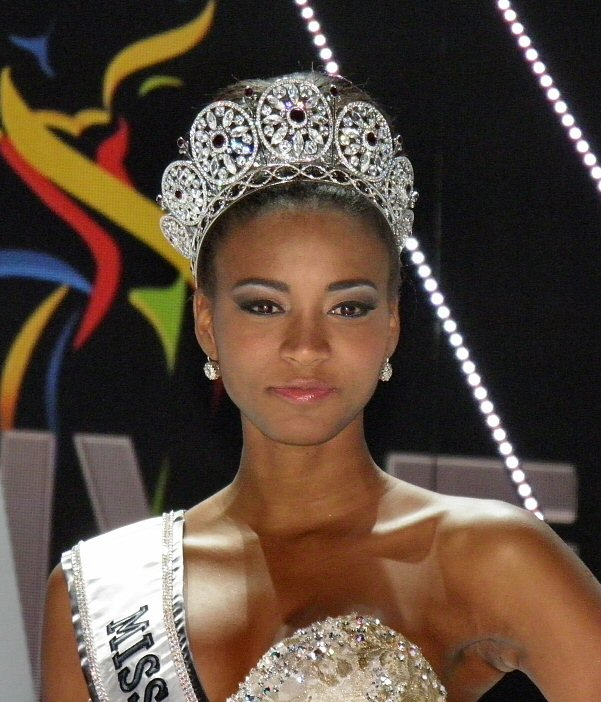
Lopes after being crowned Miss Universe 2011

The Miss Angola competition holds provincial contests every year, with 18 delegates across Angola with three overseas competitors.

- Miss Bengo
- Miss Banguela
- Miss Bié
- Miss Cabinda
- Miss Cuando Cubango
- Miss Cuanza Norte
- Miss Cuanza Sul
- Miss Cunene
- Miss Huambo
- Miss Huíla
- Miss Luanda
- Miss Luanda Norte
- Miss Lunda Sul
- Miss Malanje
- Miss Moxico
- Miss Namibe
- Miss Uíge
- Miss Zaire
- Miss Angola Benelux (overseas)
- Miss Angola Netherlands (overseas)
- Miss Angola UK (overseas)

== Titleholders ==
Year	Miss Angola	Province
1997	Emília Guardado	Cabinda
1998	Egídia Torres	Luanda
1999	Karine Eunice da Cunha Manita	Luanda
2000	Hidianeth Luisa Cussema	Bie
2001	Geovana Pinto Leite	Benguela
2002	Ana José Sebastião	Luanda
2003	Telma de Jesus Sonhi	Lunda Sul
2004	Zenilde Josias	Luanda
2005	Stiviandra Oliveira	Huíla
2006	Micaela Reis	Luanda
2007	Lesliana Pereira	Zaire
2008	Nelsa Alves	Luanda
2009	Jurema Ferraz	Namibe
2010	Leila Lopes; Miss Universe 2011	Benguela
2011	Marcelina Vahekeni	Cunene
2012	Vaumara Rebelo	Luanda
2013	Zuleica Wilson	Cabinda
2014	Whitney Shikongo	Huíla
2015	Luísa Baptista	Cuando Cubango
2016	Lauriela Martins	Cabinda
2018	Ana Liliana Avião	Luanda
2019	Salett Natalia Martins Miguel	Cuanza Sul
2022	Swelia Da Silva Antonio	Luanda
2023	Ana Coimbra	Benguela
2024	Maria Cunha	Luanda
2025	Wanderléia Rodrigues	Cuanza Norte
2026	Eugénia das Neves	Uíge

== Angola representatives at international pageants ==
=== Miss Angola Universo ===
- : Declared as Winner
- : Ended as runner-up or top 5/6 qualification
- : Ended as one of the finalists or semifinalists
- : Ended as special awards winner

The main winner of Miss Angola represents Angola at Miss Universe pageant. On occasion, when the winner does not qualify (due to age) for either contest, a runner-up is sent.

Year	Province	Miss Angola	Placement at Miss Universe	Special awards	Notes
Leila Lopes directorship — a franchise holder to Miss Universe from 2022.
2027	Uíge	Eugénia das Neves	TBA	TBA	
2026	Cuanza Norte	Wanderléia Bango Nicolau Rodrigues	Did not compete		
2025	Luanda	Maria Augusta Mendes da Cunha	Unplaced		
2024	Benguela	Nelma Tchissola Ferreira	Unplaced		Appointed — Nelma was crowned Miss World Angola 2018 and 2nd Runner-Up of Miss Angola 2022.
2023	Benguela	Ana Bárbara Da Silva Coimbra	Unplaced	Voice For Change (Gold Winner)	
2022	Luanda	Swelia Da Silva António	Unplaced		Before winning Miss Angola 2022, Antonio competed at Miss Supranational 2021 in Poland and made the Top 12 as Netherlands' representative.
Ana Paula Lemos dos Santos directorship — a franchise holder to Miss Universe between 1998―2019
Due to the impact of COVID-19 pandemic, no representative in 2020—2021
2019	Cuanza Sul	Salett Natalia Martins Miguel	Unplaced		
2018	Luanda	Ana Liliana Avião	Unplaced		
2017	Cabinda	Lauriela Márcia Martins	Unplaced		Later became Miss International Angola 2025
2016	Cuando Cubango	Luísa Djanice da Silva Baptista	Unplaced		
2015	Huíla	Whitney Houston de Abreu Shikongo	Unplaced	Miss Congeniality	
2014	Cabinda	Zuleica Marilha dos Santos Wilson	Unplaced		
2013	Luanda	Vaumara Patricia Carriço Rebelo	Unplaced		
2012	Cunene	Marcelina Vahekeni	Unplaced		
2011	Benguela	Leila Luliana da Costa Vieira Lopes	Miss Universe 2011		Named as the 4th Miss Universe from Africa.
2010	Namibe	Jurema Ferraz	Unplaced		
2009	Luanda	Nelsa Suraia Pombal Alves	Unplaced		
2008	Huíla	Lesliana Massoxi Amaro Gomes Pereira	Unplaced		
2007	Luanda	Micaela Patrícia de Brito Reis	Top 10		
2006	Luanda	Isménia Júnior (Note: Replacement)	Unplaced		Replacement — Isménia Júnior was originally the first runner-up at Miss Angola 2005, but went on to compete in Miss Universe 2006 after the original winner Stiviandra Oliveira was too young to compete, being only 17; Oliveira went on to compete in Miss World 2006 instead.
2005	Luanda	Zenilde Laurinda Josias	Unplaced		
2004	Lunda Sul	Telma de Jesus Esperança Sonhi	Top 15		
2003	Luanda	Ana José Sebastião	Top 15		
2002	Luanda	Geovana Pinto Leite	Unplaced		
2001	Luanda	Hidianeth Luisa Cussema	Unplaced		
2000	Luanda	Eunice Karinne da Cunha Manita	Unplaced		
1999	Cabinda	Egídia Torres	Unplaced		
1998	Luanda	Emília Guardado	Unplaced		

=== Miss Angola Mundo ===
- : Declared as Winner
- : Ended as runner-up or top 5/6 qualification
- : Ended as one of the finalists or semifinalists
- : Ended as special awards winner

Before 2013 the 1st Runner-up of Miss Angola participated at Miss World pageant, but in some years the main winner also represented the Angola at Miss World. From 2013, a new foundation called Miss Angola Mundo pageant independently selected Angolan representation to Miss World.

Year	Province	Miss Angola Mundo	Placement at Miss World	Special awards	Notes
Miss Mundo Angola directorship — a franchise holder to Miss World from 2013
2025	Luanda	Nuria Patricia de Assis Ferreira	Unplaced		
Miss World 2023 was rescheduled to 2024 due to the change of host and when entering India as the new host, there were several issues that caused the postponement until March 2024.
2023	Luanda	Florinda Amélia José	Unplaced		
Miss World 2021 was rescheduled to 16 March 2022 due to the COVID-19 pandemic outbreak in Puerto Rico, no edition started in 2022.
2021	Huambo	Ruth Bianca Pereira Carlos	Unplaced		
2019	Luanda	Brezana Virginia de Almeida da Costa	Unplaced		
2018	Luanda	Nelma Tchissola Ferreira	Unplaced		
2017	Luanda	Judelsia Diemba Bache	Unplaced		
Did not compete between 2014—2016: After the release of the Miss World license contract at Miss Angola, and finally Angola was absent for years without a Miss World license holder in Angola for 3 years.
2013	Uíge	Maria Castelo	Unplaced		
2012	Luanda	Edmilza Nicósia Mota dos Santos	Unplaced		
2011	Luanda	Edmilza Nicósia Mota dos Santos	Did not compete		
2010	Benguela	Ivaniltan "Ivanita" de Fatima Lorenco Paulo Jones	Unplaced		
2009	Huambo	Jercinalda "Nadia" Silva	Unplaced		
2008	Luanda	Brigite da Conceição Francisco dos Santos	Top 5		
2007	Uíge	Micaela Patrícia de Brito Reis	1st Runner-up		
2006	Huíla	Stiviandra Ribeiro de Oliveira	Top 6		
2005	Cubango	Cláudia Mariza Manuel Santana	Did not compete		
2004	Luanda	Silvia Anair João de Deus	Unplaced		
2003	Luanda	Celma Katia Antunes Carlos	Unplaced		
2002	Luanda	Rosa Mujinga Muxito	Unplaced		
2001	Luanda	Adalgisa Alexandra Da Rocha Goncalves	Unplaced		
2000	Luanda	Deolinda Manuel Vilela	Unplaced		
1999	Luanda	Lorena Silva	Unplaced		
1998	Luanda	Manuela Cortez de Lemos Joao	Unplaced		

=== Miss Angola Internacional ===
- : Declared as Winner
- : Ended as runner-up or top 5/6 qualification
- : Ended as one of the finalists or semifinalists
- : Ended as special awards winner

The Miss International Angola was declared by the Miss Angola Organization. In 2004 Angola debuted at Miss International, and Miss Angola 2003, Telma de Jesus Sonhi went to China at Miss International in 2004. That year is the only edition of Angola competing in history under Miss Angola Organization.

Year	Province	Miss Angola Internacional	Placement at Miss International	Special awards	Notes
Miss Angola Internacional directorship — a franchise holder to Miss International from 2023
2025	Cabinda	Lauriela Martins	Top 20		Previously Miss Universe Angola 2017
2024	Did not compete				
2023	Zaire	Teresa Antonio Sara	Unplaced	Best National Costume; Best Evening Gown (Top 7)	
Ana Paula Lemos dos Santos directorship — a franchise holder to Miss International in 2004
Did not compete between 2005—2022
2004	Lunda Sul	Telma de Jesus Esperança Sonhi	Unplaced		

== Gallery of winners ==
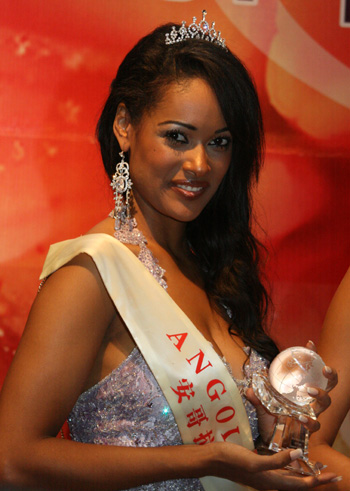
Micaela Reis, Miss Angola 2006 & Miss World 2007 first runner-up

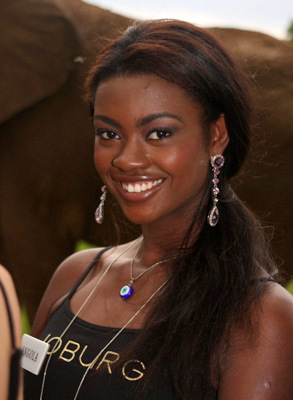
Birgite dos Santos, Miss Angola 2008 first runner-up and Miss Angola Mundo 2008

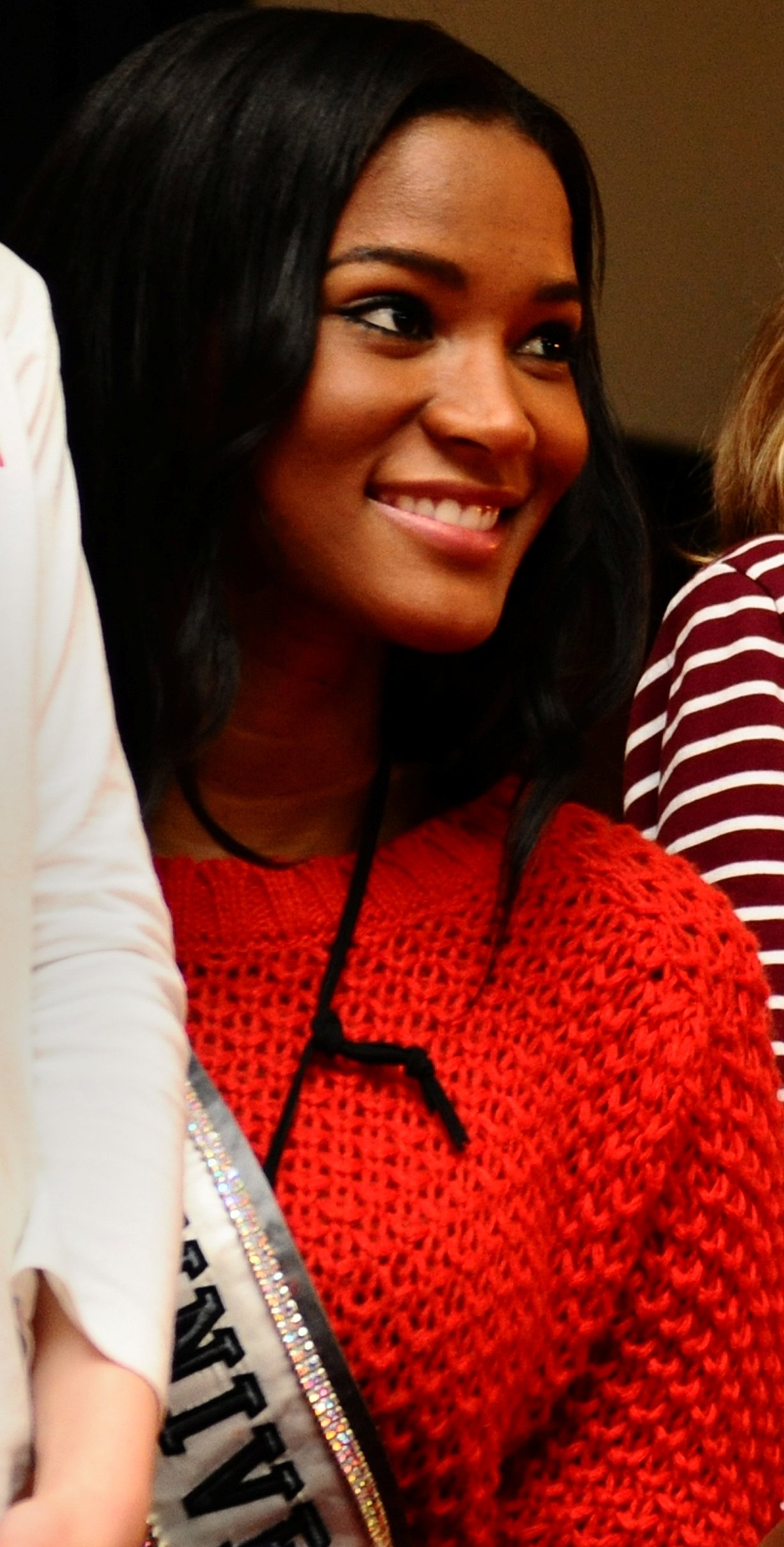
Leila Lopes,
Miss Angola 2010 and Miss Universe 2011

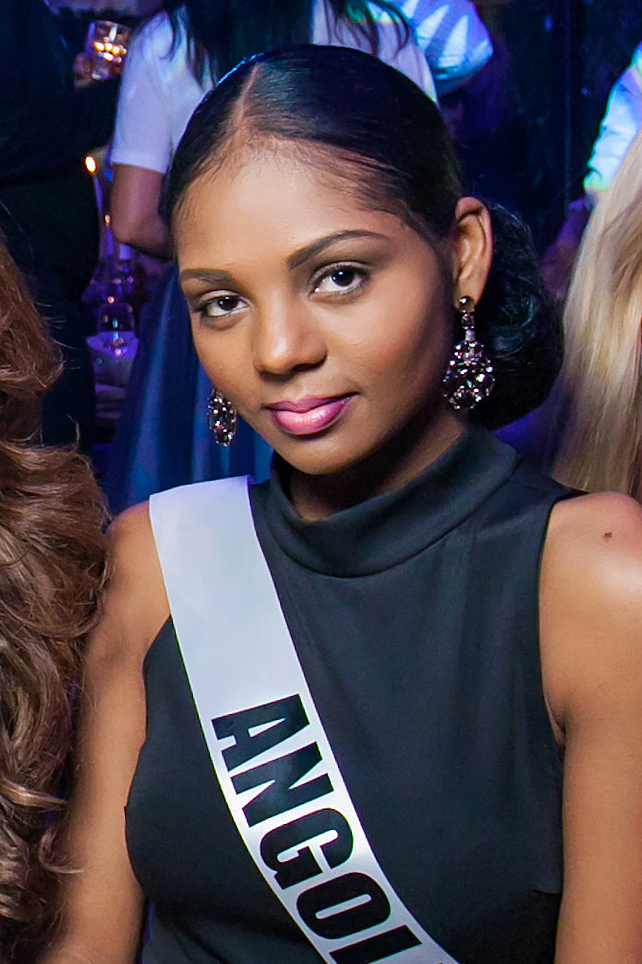
Vaumara Rebelo, Miss Angola 2012
