= María Cristina Ramos (model) =

Puerto Rican model and beauty queen (born 1996)

Cristina Ramos
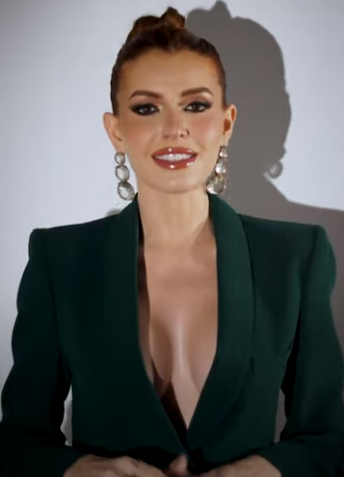
- Cristina Ramos in 2023
- Born: María Cristina Ramos Ayala; Caguas, Puerto Rico
- Height: 1.79 m (5 ft 10 1/2 in)
- Beauty pageant titleholder
- Title: Miss Grand Puerto Rico 2023
- Major competitions: Nuestra Belleza Puerto Rico 2023 (Winner - Miss Grand Puerto Rico); Miss Grand International 2023 (Top 20)

María Cristina Ramos Ayala is a Puerto Rican model and beauty pageant titleholder. She represented Caguas at Nuestra Belleza Puerto Rico 2023 and was crowned Miss Grand Puerto Rico 2023. Ramos represented Puerto Rico at Miss Grand International 2023 in Vietnam, and placed in the top 20.

== Early life and education ==
Cristina Ramos was born in 1997 in Caguas, Puerto Rico, and completed a bachelor's degree in marketing and public relations from the Universidad del Sagrado Corazón.

Currently, Cristina is a fashion model affiliated with G Models by Gretchen Capó of Puerto Rico, and also a volunteer for the American Cancer Association, Puerto Rican Down Syndrome Foundation, and Muscular Dystrophy Association in Puerto Rico.

== Pageantry ==
Cristina represented Caguas at the Nuestra Belleza Puerto Rico 2023 competition held on April 13, 2023, at the Condado Plaza Hilton Hotel, and was crowned Miss Grand Puerto Rico 2023, which is one of the three main titles in the pageant. Cristina then represented Puerto Rico at Miss Grand International 2023 in Vietnam.

Previously, Cristina participated in Miss & Mister Beauty International Puerto Rico in 2021 representing the city of Cidra, and also won the main title.

Awards and achievements
Preceded by Oxana Rivera	Miss Grand Puerto Rico; 2023	Succeeded by Mariangie Alicea
