= Whitney Shikongo =

Angolan model and beauty pageant titleholder

Whitney Houston Shikongo
- Born: Whitney Shikongo; January 27, 1995 (age 31); Lubango, Angola
- Height: 5 ft 11 in (1.80 m)
- Beauty pageant titleholder
- Title: Miss Angola 2014
- Hair color: Black
- Eye color: Brown
- Major competitions: Miss Angola 2014 (Winner); Miss Universe 2015 (Unplaced) (Miss Congeniality)

Whitney Shikongo (born January 27, 1995) is an Angolan model and beauty pageant titleholder who was crowned Miss Angola 2014 and represented her country at the Miss Universe 2015 pageant.

== Personal life ==
Shikongo was taking a humanities course in the eleventh-grade semester when she decided to join the Miss Angola pageant. On August 25, 2014, she was crowned Miss Huíla Angola 2014 and represented the region at Miss Angola 2014.

=== Miss Angola 2014 ===
After being crowned as Miss Huíla Angola 2014, Shikongo competed at the Miss Angola pageant. She made history as the first woman from Huíla to win the pageant when she won the title of Miss Angola 2014 on December 20, 2014 in the capital city of Angola, Luanda. As of 2015, she is the 17th Angolan woman to compete at the Miss Universe pageant.

=== Miss Universe 2015 ===
Whitney represented Angola at Miss Universe 2015 and was unplaced. She was awarded Miss Congeniality.

Awards and achievements
Preceded by Zuleica Wilson	Miss Angola; 2014	Succeeded by Luísa Baptista
