= María Cristina Ramos (writer) =

Argentine writer, educator (born 1952)

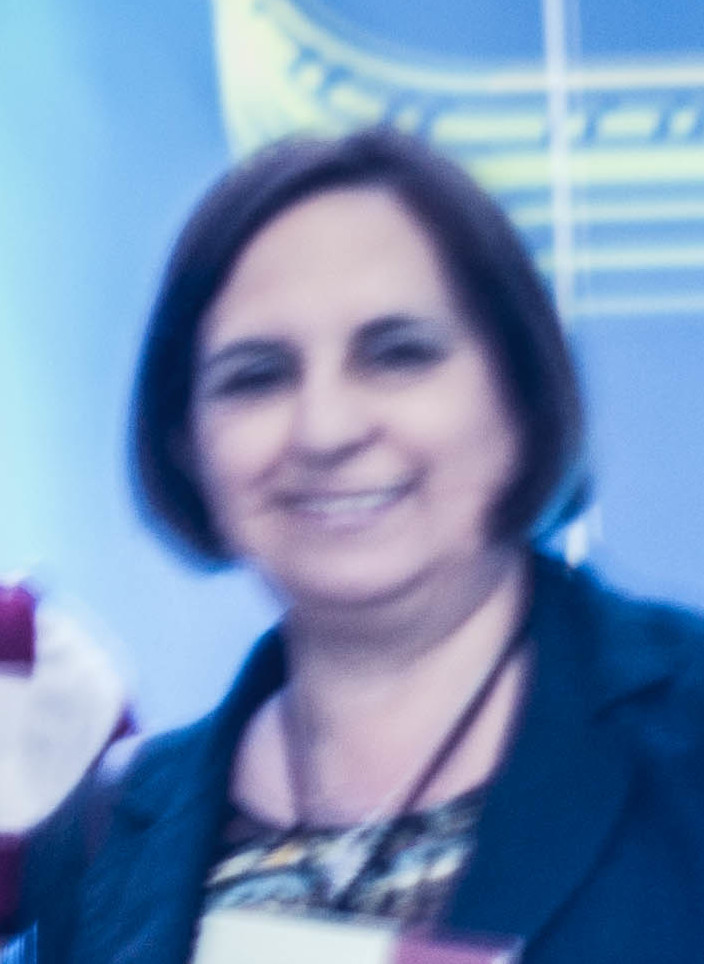
María Cristina Ramos

María Cristina Ramos (born 1952) is an Argentine writer and educator. Known primarily for her children's books, she was awarded the SM Ibero-American Prize for Children's and Youth Literature in 2016. In 2020, she was named a finalist for the Hans Christian Andersen Award.

== Biography ==
Ramos was born in San Rafael, Mendoza, Argentina, in 1952. She has lived most of her life in Neuquén.

In 1988, Ramos published her first children's book, the poetry anthology Un sol para tu sombrero (A Sun for Your Hat). She has since published over 50 works. Her books have been translated into English, Chinese, Korean, and Portuguese. In 2002, Ramos established her own publishing company, Editorial Ruedamares.

Ramos is a teacher educator who, in addition to children's literature, writes pedagogical texts. She has led reading initiatives at the regional and national level.

== Awards and honours ==
In 2016, Ramos won the SM Ibero-American Prize for Children's and Youth Literature (worth €26,701).

In 2020, she was named one of six finalists for the International Board on Books for Young People's Hans Christian Andersen Award, one of the top prizes for writers of children's literature. Ramos was the second Argentine author to earn this nomination after María Teresa Andruetto, who won the award in 2012.

== Selected works ==
- Azul la cordillera (Blue, the Mountain Chain), 1995. ISBN 9875453641
- Ruedamares, pirata de la mar bravia (Wheel-seas, Pirate of the Brave Sea), 1997. ISBN 9789871362530
- La luna lleva un silencio (The Moon Carried a Silence), 2005. ISBN 9788466745741
- Mientras duermen las piedras (Meanwhile the Stones Are Sleeping), 2009. ISBN 9789876420143
- El trasluz (Against the Light), 2013. ISBN 9789875738669
