= Leila Lopes =

Angolan beauty pageant titleholder (born 1986)

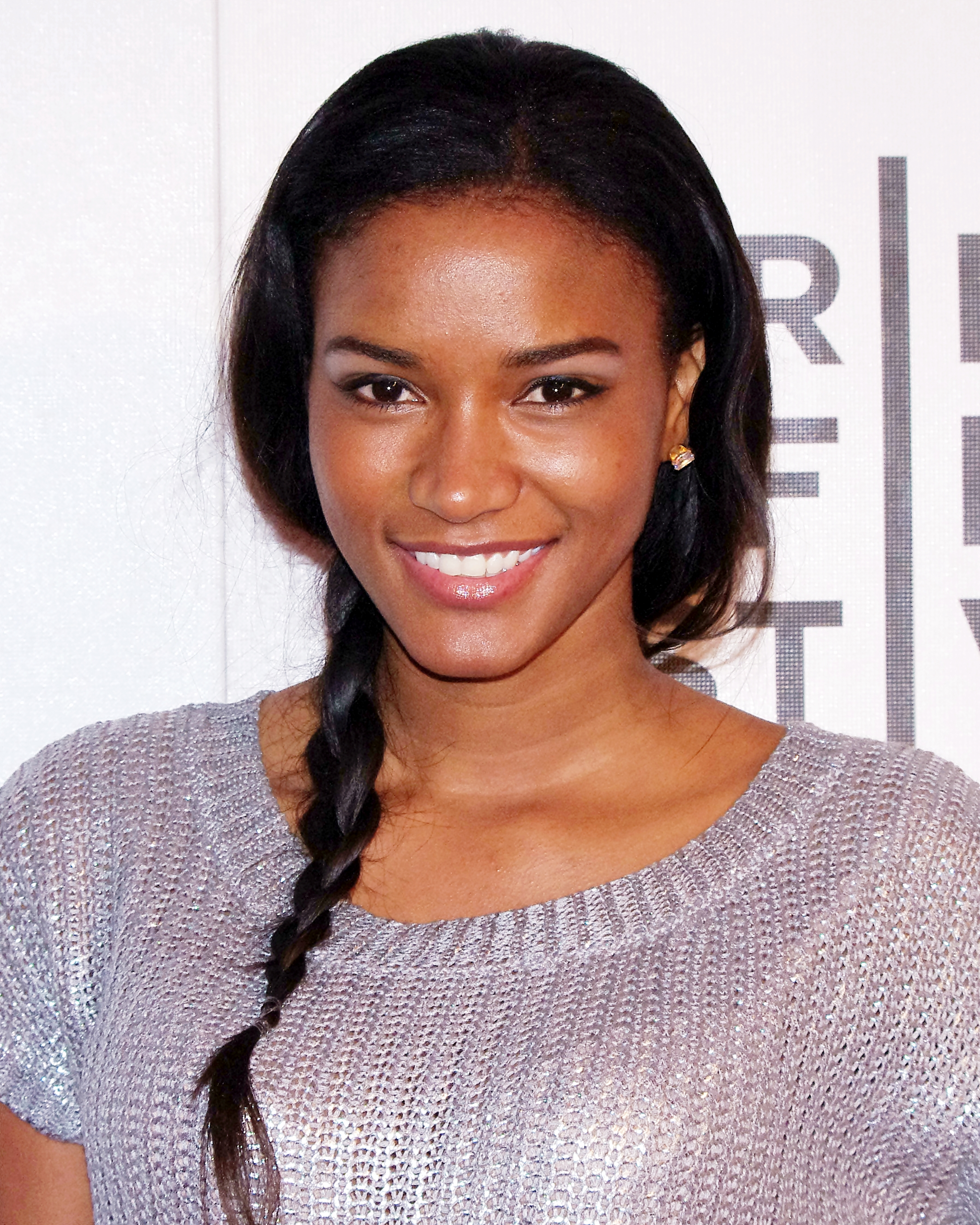
- Lopes in 2012
- Born: 26 February 1986 (age 40); Benguela, Angola
- Education: University of Suffolk
- Height: 1.80 m (5 ft 11 in)
- Spouse: Osi Umenyiora (m. 2015)
- Children: 2
- Beauty pageant titleholder
- Title: Miss Angola UK 2010; Miss Angola 2010; Miss Universe 2011
- Major competitions: Miss Angola 2010; (Winner); Miss Universe 2011; (Winner)

Leila Lopes (born 26 February 1986) is an Angolan beauty pageant titleholder who was crowned Miss Universe 2011. She had previously won Miss Angola UK 2010 and Miss Angola 2010.

== Early life ==
Lopes was born on 26 February 1986, in Benguela, Angola. Prior to being a contestant in beauty pageants, she studied business management at the University of Suffolk in Ipswich, UK. Lopes is actively involved in raising awareness about HIV/AIDS and the discrimination that people with the disease experience.

== Pageantry ==
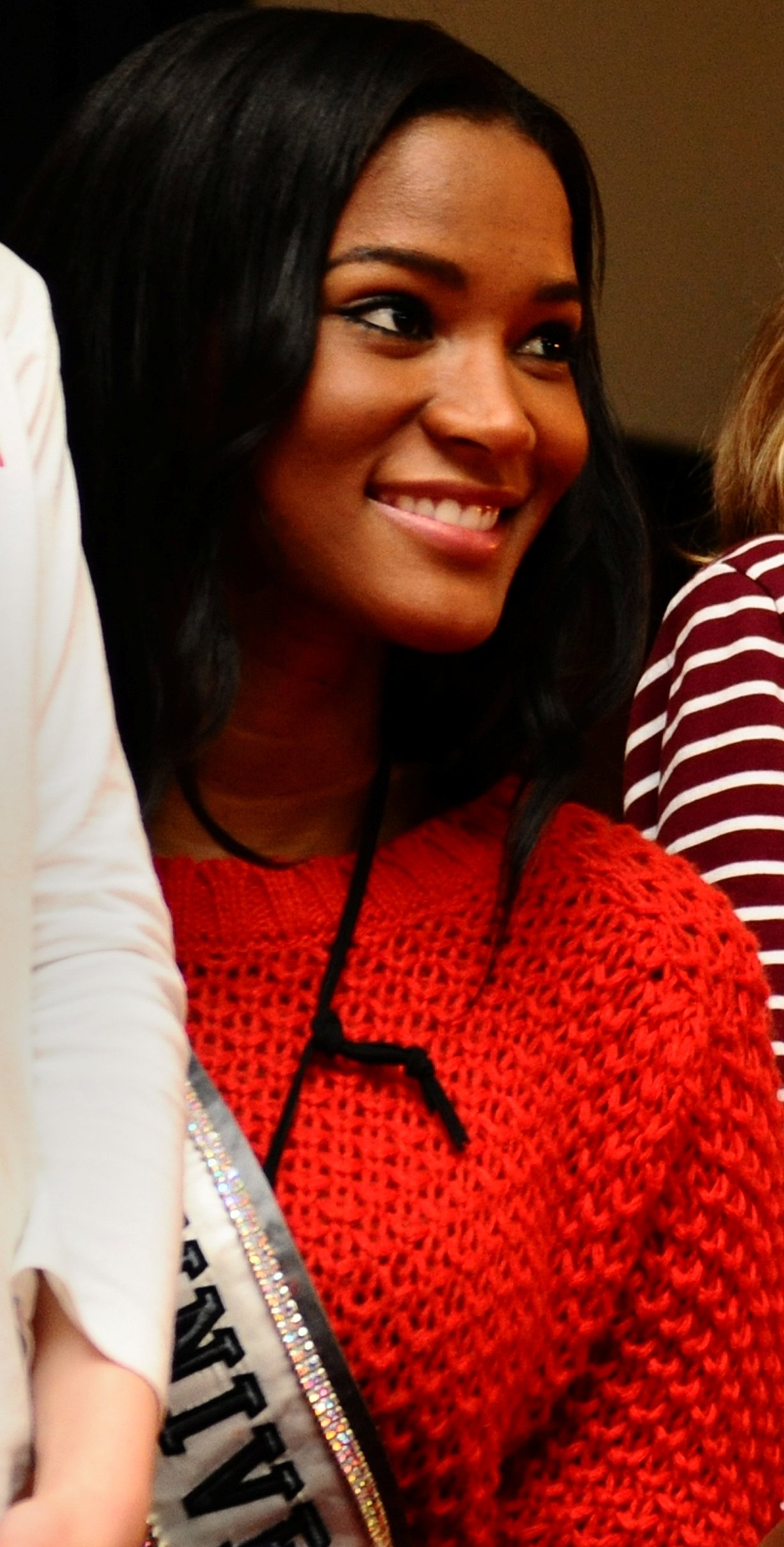
Lopes in 2012

=== Miss Angola UK 2010 ===
While living and studying in England, she participated in Miss Angola UK contest on 8 October 2010. Lopes won the title, giving her the opportunity to represent the British Angolan community in Miss Angola 2010.

==== Miss Angola UK controversy ====
After Lopes was crowned Miss Universe 2011, allegations arose that false documents were used to allow her to participate in Miss Angola UK, which enabled her to compete in Miss Angola and subsequently Miss Universe. It was claimed that Lopes had never lived outside of Angola at the time she competed, so she should not have been allowed to enter a competition that was exclusively for Angolan citizens living in the UK. The use of false documents has since been denied by both Lopes and the Miss Universe organizers and Lopes herself has stated that she had lived in England for almost four years and attended business school for two years.

=== Miss Angola 2010 ===
Lopes competed against 20 other candidates to win Miss Angola in Luanda on 18 December 2010, gaining her the right to represent Angola in Miss Universe 2011. She also obtained the Photogenic Award during the contest.

=== Miss Universe 2011 ===
On 12 September 2011, Lopes was crowned Miss Universe in São Paulo, Brazil, receiving the title from Miss Universe 2010, Ximena Navarrete of Mexico. She was the first Angolan woman to hold the position.

In October 2011, Lopes paid a visit to Indonesia where she attended local charity events and Puteri Indonesia 2011 pageant held at Jakarta Convention Center, in Jakarta.

In December 2011, Lopes was invited to attend the first edition of the Miss Gabon pageant in Libreville, Gabon where she crowned the first Gabonese representative to Miss Universe, Marie-Noëlle Ada Meyo from Ngounié Province.

In February 2012, Lopes visited Johannesburg, South Africa. On arrival she was welcomed by Miss South Africa 2011 Melinda Bam at a red carpet event in Sun City. During her visit, Lopes attended a launch event for African Fashion International on 16 February in support of Joburg Fashion Week 2012. She also visited one of Melinda Bam's supported charities - Thuthuzela, an NGO in Alexandra, Johannesburg. Lopes also attended the State of the Province Address by Honourable Thandi Modise, Premier of the North-West, on 17 February at the North-West University, Mafikeng Campus.

Lopes travelled to Düsseldorf, Germany for the week-long USO/Armed Forces Entertainment tour from 9–14 March 2012. There, she also participated in the Beauty International Trade Show at the Düsseldorf Exhibition Centre.

Lopes attended the Cannes Film Festival in Cannes, France on 23 May 2012. She also attended the De Grisogono Glam Extravaganza held at the Hotel Du Cap Eden-Roc in Cap d'Antibes on the same day. Prior to her visit to France, she was in Lisbon, Portugal for a series of photoshoots and television appearances, at the invitation of Maxim Portugal Magazine.

In June 2012, Lopes embarked on a tour of Senegal, Côte d'Ivoire, Ghana, Togo and Nigeria. Later that month, Lopes attended the Rio+20 United Nations Conference on Sustainable Development in Rio de Janeiro, Brazil.

== Personal life ==
In February 2013, she became engaged to former New York Giants defensive end Osi Umenyiora in Monaco. They were married on 30 May 2015.

In October 2023, Lopes started practicing Brazilian jiu-jitsu at Alliance Jiu Jitsu London under Renata Marinho and Fábio Gurgel.

Awards and achievements
Preceded by (Mexico) Ximena Navarrete	Miss Universe; 2011	Succeeded by (United States) Olivia Culpo
Preceded by Jurema Ferraz	Miss Angola; 2011	Succeeded by Marcelina Vahekeni
