= Miss República Portuguesa =

Beauty pageant

Miss Portuguesa Organization
- Formation: 2003 (as Miss Mundo Portugal); 2014 (as Miss República Portuguesa)
- Type: Beauty pageant
- Headquarters: Lisbon
- Location: Portugal
- Members: Miss World; Miss International; Miss Supranational; Miss Grand International; Miss Cosmo; Reina Hispanoamericana; Reinado Internacional del Café Miss Tourism International; Miss Global Beauty; Miss ECO International; Miss Tourism Queen International; Miss Tourism Queen of the Year International; Miss Tourism Metropolitan International; Miss University International; Miss Oriental Tourism; Miss All Nations; Miss 7 Continents; Miss Princess of the Globe; Miss EM; Supermodel International
- Official language: Portuguese
- President: Isidro de Brito
- Website: missportuguesa.pt

Miss República Portuguesa is a national Beauty pageant in Portugal. The main winner of the contest is sent to Miss World.

== History ==
Miss República Portuguesa was made in 2011 by Isidro de Brito as Miss Mundo Portuguesa. In 2014, after undergoing a major restructuring process, the organization separated the two national pageants into separate events: "Miss Universo Portugal" and "Miss World Portugal".

=== Miss Universo Portugal ===
- Before Miss República Portuguesa, the traditional pageant Miss Portugal was held in 1960 for the first time. The pageant used to send representatives for Portugal to the Miss World, Miss Universe and Miss International pageants. In 2011 the Miss Universo Portugal was held for the first time by GAETA, Promoções e Eventos, Lda. and NIU, the franchise holder of Miss Universe in Portugal.
- In 2014 the Miss Universo Portugal branding was independently acquired by Isidiro de Brito under Miss República Portuguesa. The contest was separated by the organizers. He also owned Miss Supranational, Miss Grand International, Miss Intercontinental and other pageants to Miss República Portuguesa titleholders.
- In 2016 Edward Walson partnered to Miss Universo Portugal. He is the owner of the Miss Universo Italia pageant.
- In 2018 Isidiro de Brito owned major pageants and the Miss República Portuguesa Organization franchised Miss Universe, Miss World, Miss International and other pageants to Miss Portuguesa titleholders.

== Titleholders ==
Miss República Portuguesa organization was made by Isidro de Brito and team. The organization was previously called "Miss Mundo Portugal" and the winner represented Portugal at the Miss World pageant. Since 2014 the new setting called "Miss República Portuguesa" or "Miss Portuguesa" will select the winner to Miss World and runner-ups will have the opportunity to represent Portugal at other pageants such as Miss Universe, Miss International, Miss Supranational, and Miss Grand International.

- : Declared as Winner
- : Ended as runner-up or top 5/6 qualification
- : Ended as one of the finalists or semifinalists
- : Ended as special awards winner

=== Miss Universo Portugal ===
Before 2011 Miss Portugal 1959 to Miss Portugal 2001 winner participated at Miss Universe competition. Between 2002 and 2010 there was no franchise holder to sign up the Miss Universe organization. began 2011 the new pageant held as 'Miss Universo Portugal" contest and it continued in 2014 as a beginning from Miss República Portuguesa by Isidiro de Brito Directorship. Since 2014 the Portuguese representative at Miss Universe will be crowned at Miss Universo Portugal competition (separate contest but still in under Isidiro de Brito directorship). On occasion, when the winner does not qualify (due to age) for either contest, a runner-up is sent. Beginning in 2022, a separate Miss Universo Portugal has been created.

Year	District	Miss Universo Portugal	Placement at Miss Universe	Special Awards	Notes
2026	Porto	Isabela Santos	TBA		
2025	Setúbal	Camila Vitorino	Unplced		
2024	Portuguese Riviera	Andreia Correia	Unplaced		
2023	Setúbal	Marina Machete	Top 20		
2022	Porto	Telma Madeira	Top 16		
2021	Lisbon	Oricia Domínguez	Unplaced		Oricia was 2nd Runner-up at Miss Venezuela 2018, representing Táchira
2020	Porto	Cristiana Silva	Unplaced		Appointed — Due to the impact of COVID-19 pandemic, no national pageant in 2020
2019	Braga	Sylvie Silva	Top 20		
2018	Setúbal	Filipa Barroso	Unplaced		Isidro de Brito Directorship — Isidiro de Brito formatted the previous Miss República Portuguesa 2017 to participate at Miss Universe. In 2018 there was no Miss Universe Portugal contest after the pageant under Isidiro de Brito postponed
2017	Setúbal	Matilde Ramos Lima	Unplaced		
2016	Madeira	Flávia Joana Gouveia Brito	Unplaced		Edward Wilson Directorship — Brito was Continental Queen of Europe at Miss Tourism World 2013
2015	Azores	Maria Emilia Rosa Rodrigues Araújo	Unplaced		
2014	Aveiro	Patrícia Carvalho Da Silva	Unplaced		Miss Universo Portugal — Isidro de Brito Directorship
Did not compete between 2012—2013
2011	Lisbon	Laura Gonçalves	Top 10	Internet Vote	Miss Universo Portugal — GAETA, Promoções e Eventos, Lda. and NIU Directorship
Miss Portugal
Did not compete between 2003—2010
2002	Ovar	Iva Lamarão	Unplaced		The Miss Portugal contest ended in 2001
2001	Setúbal	Claúdia Jesus Lopez Borges	Unplaced		Miss Portugal 2000 1st Runner-up; for personal reasons, Thelma Santos was the Miss Portugal 2000 who withdrew at the Miss Universe 2001; Claudia Borges (a runner-up) replaced her position, Claudia competed at Miss World 2001
2001	Lisbon	Thelma Santos	Did not compete		
2000	Madeira	Licinia Macedo	Unplaced		
1999	Santarém	Marisa Ferreira	Unplaced	Miss Congeniality	
1998	Porto	Icília Berenguel	Unplaced		The Miss Portugal 1997 presenter called wrong to Icília as the 2nd Runner-up but after some minutes, Icília called as the winner
1997	Lisbon	Lara Antunes	Unplaced		
1996	Bragança	Rita Carvalho	Unplaced		
1995	Faro	Adrianna Iria	Unplaced		
1994	Lisbon	Mónica Sofia Borges	Unplaced		
1993	Angola	Carla Marisa da Cruz	Unplaced		
1992	Lisbon	Maria Fernanda Silva	Unplaced		
1991	Setúbal	Carla Caldeira	Did not compete		
1990	Setúbal	Maria Angélica Rosado	Unplaced		
1989	Lisbon	Ana Francisca Gonçalves	Unplaced		
1988	Lisbon	Isabel Rodrigues Martins	Unplaced		
1987	Lisbon	Noélia Cristina Chaves	Unplaced		
1986	Lisbon	Mariana Dias Carriço	Unplaced		
1985	Lisbon	Alexandra Paula Gomes	Unplaced		
1984	Lisbon	Maria Fátima Rodrigues	Unplaced		
1983	Lisbon	Anabela Elisa Vissenjou	Unplaced		
1982	Lisbon	Ana Maria Valdiz Wilson	Unplaced		
1981	Lisbon	Paula Machado de Moura	Unplaced		
1980	Did not compete				
1979	Lisbon	Marta Mendonça Gouvêia	Unplaced		
Did not compete between 1975—1978
1974	Lisbon	Ana Paula da Silva Freitas	Unplaced		
1973	Lisbon	Carla de Barros	Unplaced		
1972	Mozambique	Iris Maria dos Santos	Unplaced		
1971	Angola	Maria Celmira Pereira	Unplaced		
1970	Lisbon	Ana Maria Diozo Lucas	Unplaced		
Did not compete between 1966—1969
1965	Lisbon	Maria do Carmo Sancho	Unplaced		
Did not compete between 1963—1964
1962	Lisbon	Maria Santos Trindade	Unplaced		
1961	Lisbon	Maria Josabete Silva Santos	Did not compete		Allocated to Miss International 1960
1960	Lisbon	María Teresa Motoa Cardoso	Unplaced		RTP - Rádio e Televisão de Portugal Directorship

=== Miss World Portugal ===
Before 2003 1st Runner-up of Miss Portugal mostly designated to compete at Miss World competition. Since 2014 the Miss República Portuguesa set the winner to compete at Miss World.

Year	District	Miss World Portugal	Placement at Miss World	Special Awards	Notes
2027	Lisbon	Bruna Nogueira	TBA		
2026	Braga	Vitoria Babinetchi	Unplaced		
2025	Porto	Maria Amélia Baptista	Unplaced		
2024	No competition held				
2023	Lisbon	Catarina Ferreira	Unplaced		
2022	Due to the impact of COVID-19 pandemic, no pageant in 2022				
2021	Vila Real	Lidy Alves	Unplaced		
2020	Due to the impact of COVID-19 pandemic, no pageant in 2020				
2019	Oeiras	Inés Brusselmans	Top 40	Miss World Sport (Top 32)	
2018	Lisbon	Carla Rodrigues	Unplaced	World Dress Designer award (Top 5)	Cara was Top 10 at Miss Venezuela 2011, representing Lara
2017	Setúbal	Filipa Barroso	Unplaced		
2016	Porto	Cristiana Viana	Unplaced		
2015	Setúbal	Rafaela Pardete	Unplaced		
2014	Santarém	Zita Oliveira	Unplaced		Miss República Portuguesa — Isidro de Brito Directorship
Miss Mundo Portugal
2013	Porto	Elisabete Rodrigues	Unplaced		
2012	Lisbon	Melanie Vicente	Top 30	Miss World Beach Beauty (Top 40); Miss World Sport (Top 24)	On the leader board of Miss World competition, Portugal placed in the Top 30 qualification Top 15 but not included as the Semi-finalist
2011	Madeira	Bárbara Franco	Unplaced	Miss World Sport (Top 24)	Miss Mundo Portugal — Isidro de Brito Directorship
2010	Portalegre	Catarina Aragonez	Unplaced		
2009	Viana do Castelo	Marta Ferriera Cadilha	Did not compete		
2008	Lisbon	Andréia Rodrigues	Unplaced	Miss World Sport (2nd Runner-up); Miss World Talent (Top 19)	
2007	Did not compete				
2006	Lisbon	Sara Almeida	Unplaced	Miss World Talent (Top 10)	
2005	Setúbal	Ângela Maria Fonseca Spínola	Unplaced		
2004	Lisbon	Patricia Oliveira Raposa de Oliveira	Unplaced		
2003	Lisbon	Vanessa Job	Unplaced		Miss World Portugal selection
Portuguese Representatives from Miss Portugal
2002	Did not compete				
2001	Lisbon	Claudia Jesus Lopez Borges	Unplaced		
2000	Lisbon	Gilda Dias Pe-Curto	Unplaced		
1999	Castelo Branco	Joana Ines Texeira	Unplaced		
1998	Braga	Marcia Vasconcelos	Unplaced		
1997	Porto	Icilia Berenguel	Unplaced		
1996	Lisbon	Ana Mafalda Schaefer de Almeida Santos	Unplaced		
1995	Lisbon	Suzana Leitao Robalo	Unplaced		
1994	Lisbon	Leonor Filipa Correia Leal Rodrigues	Unplaced		
1993	Porto	Ana Luisa Barbosa Moreira	Unplaced		
1992	Lisbon	Fernanda Manuela Santos	Unplaced		
1991	Lisbon	Maria do Carmo Ramalho	Unplaced		
1990	Lisbon	Filomena Paula Dias Miranda Marques	Unplaced		
1989	Setúbal	Maria Angelica Rosado	Unplaced		
1988	Setúbal	Helena Isabel de Cunha Laureano	Unplaced		
1987	Lisbon	Paula Isabel Leal do Sousa	Unplaced		
1986	Lisbon	Elsa Maria Rodrigues	Unplaced		
1985	Lisbon	Maria de Fátima da Silva Alves Raimundo	Unplaced		The Runner-up in 1984 did not go to Miss World for personal reasons; the Miss Portugal 1983 appointed to compete in 1985
1984	Lisbon	Maria Leonor Mendes Correia	Unplaced		
1983	Lisbon	Cesaltina de Conceiçao Lopes da Silva	Unplaced		
1982	Lisbon	Suzana Walker dos Santos Dias	Unplaced		
Did not compete between 1980—1981
1979	Lisbon	Ana Gonçalves Vieira	Unplaced		
Did not compete between 1974—1978
1973	Lisbon	Maria Helene Pereira Martins	Unplaced		
1972	Mozambique	Anita Marques	Unplaced		
1971	Mozambique	Ana Paula de Almeida	2nd Runner-Up		
1970	Lisbon	Ana Maria Diozo Lucas	Unplaced		
Did not compete between 1968—1969
1967	Mozambique	Teresa Amaro	Unplaced		
Did not compete between 1965—1966
1964	Lisbon	Rolanda Campos	Unplaced		
1963	Lisbon	Maria Penedo	Unplaced		
1962	Lisbon	Palmira Ferreira	Unplaced		
Did not compete between 1960—1961
1959	Lisbon	Maria Teresa Motoa Cardoso	Unplaced		RTP - Rádio e Televisão de Portugal Directorship

=== Miss International Portugal ===
Before 2011 2nd Runner-up of Miss Portugal mostly designated to compete at Miss International competition. Since 2011 the Miss República Portuguesa set one of runners-up to compete at Miss International.

Year	District	Miss International Portugal	Placement at Miss International	Special Awards	Notes
2026	Madeira	Lisandra Gonçalves	TBA		
2025	Porto	Sofia Mota Jorge	Unplaced		
2024	Santarém	Maria Rosado	Unplaced		
2023	Lisbon	Lilene Vieira Serrão	Unplaced		
2022	Lisbon	Rita Bitton Reis	Unplaced		
Due to the impact of COVID-19 pandemic, no pageant between 2020 and 2021
2019	Aveiro	Ana Rita Aguiar	Unplaced		
2018	Lisbon	Carina Neto	Unplaced		
2017	Lisbon	Ana Marques	Unplaced		
2016	Lisbon	Carina Frazão	Unplaced		
2015	Porto	Isabel Maria Pinho Vieira	Unplaced	Miss International Europe	
2014	Setúbal	Rafaela Pardete	Unplaced		
2013	Madeira	Ana Claudia Ornelas Bonfim	Unplaced		Ana was Top 20 at Miss Grand International 2016
2012	Lisbon	Joana Peta	Unplaced		
2011	Aveiro	Patrícia Da Silva	Unplaced		Miss República Portuguesa — Isidro de Brito Directorship
Portuguese Representatives from Miss Portugal
Did not compete between 2001—2010
2000	Lisbon	Tania Isabel Campanacho Ferreira	Unplaced		
1999	Lisbon	Andreia Antunes	Unplaced		
1998	Porto	Icilia Berenguel	Unplaced		
1997	Lisbon	Lara Kátia Fonseca	Unplaced		
1996	Lisbon	Fernanda Alves	Miss International 1996		
1995	Lisbon	Patrícia Trigo	Unplaced		
1994	Lisbon	Sónia Maria Marques Abel	Unplaced		
1993	Lisbon	Anabela Pacheco Centeno	Unplaced		
1992	Did not compete				
1991	Lisbon	Gisela Galhavano	Unplaced		
1990	Lisbon	Maria José dos Santos Cardoso	Unplaced		
1989	Lisbon	Helena Cristina da Silva Teixeira	Unplaced		
1988	Lisbon	Maria Helena Raposo Canelas	Unplaced		
1987	Lisbon	Susana Paula Neto da Silva Nunes	Unplaced		
1986	Lisbon	Ana Rosa Pequito Antunes	Unplaced		
1985	Lisbon	Ana Paula Machado Charepe	Unplaced		
1984	Lisbon	Teresa Alendouro Pinto	Top 15	Miss Photogenic	
1983	Lisbon	Cesaltina da Conceição Lopes da Silva	Unplaced		
1982	Lisbon	Helena Sofia Sousa Botelho	Unplaced	Best National Costume	
Did not compete between 1980—1981
1979	Lisbon	Maria Luisa da Silva	Unplaced		
Did not compete between 1975—1978
1974	Lisbon	Irene Mendes Teixeira	Unplaced		
1973	Lisbon	Aida Silva Tavares	Unplaced		
1972	Lisbon	Gilda Isabel Abreu	Top 15		
1971	Lisbon	Marie de Castro	Unplaced		
1970	Lisbon	Maria do Rosário de Freitas	Unplaced		
1969	Lisbon	Maria Isabela Rosa Pinho	Unplaced		
Did not compete between 1961—1968
1960	Lisbon	Maria Josabete Silva Santos	Unplaced		RTP - Rádio e Televisão de Portugal Directorship

=== Miss Supranational Portugal ===
Since 2016 the Miss República Portuguesa set one of runners-up to compete at Miss Supranational.

Year	District	Miss Supranational Portugal	Placement at Miss Supranational	Special Awards	Notes
2027	TBA	TBA	TBA		
2026	Lisbon	Sabrina Gladio	Unplaced		
2025	Aveiro	Daryna Levytska	Unplaced		
2024	Azores	Cristina Carvalho	Unplaced		
2023	Lisbon	Elodie Lopes	Unplaced		
2022	Porto	Ana Teixeira	Unplaced		
2021	Funchal	Nadini Machado Gumira	Unplaced		
2020	Due to the impact of COVID-19 pandemic, no pageant in 2020				
2019	Lisbon	Carolina Liquito	Unplaced		
2018	Braga	Claudia Maia	Unplaced		
2017	Setúbal	Priscila Alves	Top 10	Miss Talent	
2016	Setúbal	Linda Cardoso	Unplaced		
2015	Lisbon	Ines Brusselmans	Unplaced		
2014	Lisbon	Ana Bomfim	Unplaced		
2013	Bragança	Bruna Monteiro	Unplaced		
2012	Lisbon	Carmen Fernandes	Unplaced	Miss Elegance	
2011	Lisbon	Tania Filipa Rodrigues Costa	Unplaced		
2010	Lisbon	Olívia Ortiz	Top 20		

=== Miss Grand Portugal ===
From 2013 to 2024, Miss República Portuguesa has sent one of the runners-up to compete at Miss Grand International. The franchise was transferred to another organizer "Concurso Nacional de Beleza Portugal" (CNB Portugal) in 2025.

Year	District	Miss Grand Portugal	Original national title	International placement	Special Awards	Ref.
2025	Aveiro	Silvia Oliveira	Appointed	Unplaced		
2024	Leiria	Inês Perestrello	Miss República Portuguesa 2024 Finalist	Did not compete		
2023	Lisbon	Filipa Gama	Miss República Portuguesa 2021 Finalist	Withdrew		
2022	Lisbon	Sabrina Gladio	Appointed	Unplaced		
2021	Guarda	Ana Ferreira	Miss Grand Portugal 2021	Unplaced		
2020	Porto	Sara Duque	Appointed	Unplaced		
2019	Lisbon	Laura Gameiro	Appointed	Unplaced		
2018	Setúbal	Priscilla da Silva Alves	2nd runner-up Miss República Portuguesa 2017	Unplaced		
2017	Lisbon	Diana Sofia Santos	2nd runner-up Miss República Portuguesa 2016	Unplaced		
2016	Bragança	Ana Bomfim	Appointed	Top 20		
2015	Lisbon	Inês Filipa Gigante	Appointed	Unplaced		
2014	Lisbon	Maria Emilia Araújo	Appointed	Unplaced		
2013	Madeira	Gilda Marisela Silva	Appointed	Unplaced		

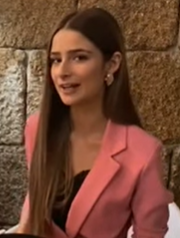
Ana Ferreira
Miss Grand Portugal 2021

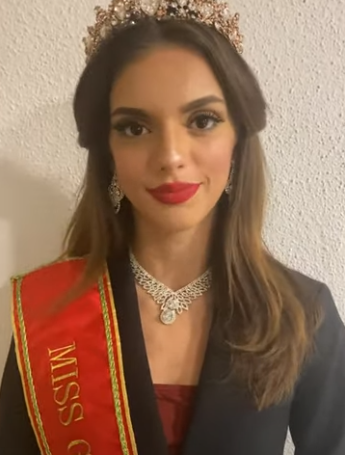
Filipa Gama
Miss Grand Portugal 2023

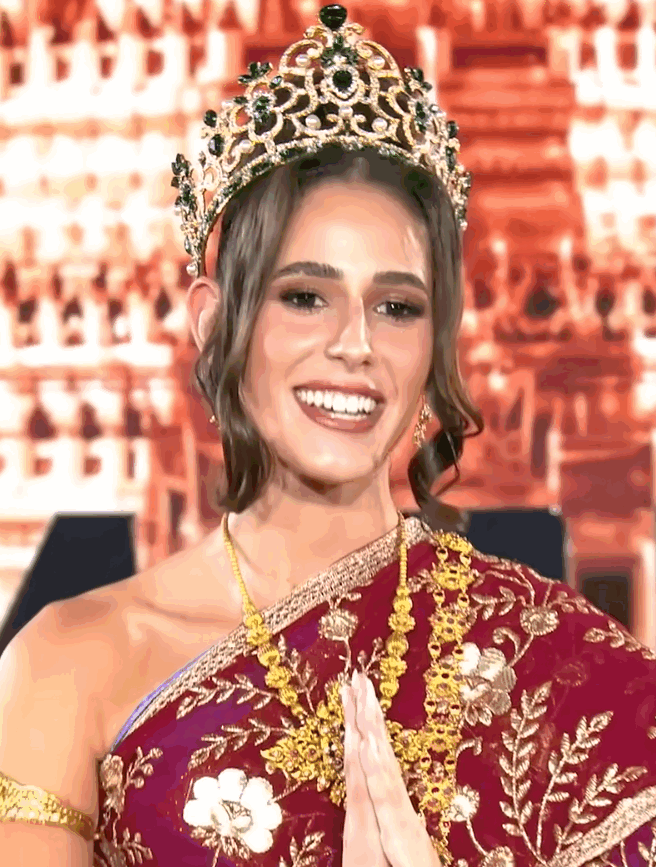
Sílvia Oliveira
Miss Grand Portugal 2025

=== Reina Hispanoamericana Portugal ===
Year	District	Reina Hispanoamericana Portugal	Placement at Reina Hispanoamericana	Special Awards	Notes
2022	Porto	Renata Ribeiro	Unplaced		
2021	Lisbon	Theresa Matos	5th Runner-Up		
2019	Porto	Diana Sofía Santos Silva	Unplaced		
2018	Porto	Ana Rita Aguiar	Unplaced		
2017	Lisbon	Tânia Filipa Rodrigues Costa	Unplaced		

=== Reinado Internacional del Café Portugal ===
Year	District	Reinado Internacional del Café Portugal	Placement at Reinado Internacional del Café	Special Awards	Notes
2020	Évora	Daniela Sofia Real Clara	Unplaced		
2019	Porto	Carina Patrícia Neto	Unplaced		
2018	Porto	Ana Cristina Leal	Unplaced		
2017	Miragaia	Ana Catarina Pereira Moreira	Unplaced		
2016	Lisbon	Inês Brusselmans Ferreira Martins	Unplaced		
2015	Lisbon	Márcia Assunção	Virreina Internacional del Café 2015	2015 Queen of Police	
2014	Porto	Elisabete Rodrigues	Unplaced		
2013	Angola	Indira Patricia Santos Ferreira	Unplaced		
2012	Zürich	Patrícia Carvalho de Oliveira	Unplaced		

=== Miss Tourism Portugal ===
Year	District	Miss Tourism Portugal	Placement at Miss Tourism International	Special Awards	Notes
2014	Lisbon	Alina Zhepko	Unplaced		
2013	Lisbon	Sara Mónica Matias da Silveira	Top 10		
2012	Lisbon	Geraldine Marie Domingues Zawisla	Unplaced		
2011	Lisbon	Ana Cláudia Da Silva Santos	Top 15		
2010	Lisbon	Maria de Luz da Silva	Unplaced		

== See also ==
- Miss Portugal
