= Miss Grand Zimbabwe 2013 =

1st Miss Grand Zimbabwe competition, beauty pageant edition

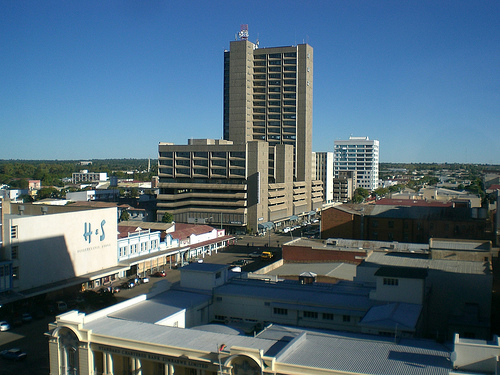
- Bulawayo, the host city
- Date: July 13, 2013
- Venue: Gardens Restaurant, Bulawayo
- Entrants: 16
- Placements: 10
- Winner: Fungai Mawada (Bulawayo)

Miss Grand Zimbabwe 2013 was the first edition of the Miss Grand Zimbabwe pageant, held on July 13, 2013, at the Gardens Restaurant in the Zimbabwe second largest city, Bulawayo. Sixteen candidates from different cities and provinces competed for the title, of whom a third-year media student from Zimbabwe Open University representing Bulawayo, Fungai Mawada, was announced the winner and obtained the right to represent the country at the inaugural of the Miss Grand International pageant in Thailand; however, Mawada was dethroned and the national director, Samantha Tshuma, nominated herself as the replacement.

The regional licenses were granted to provincial managers from all 10 provinces of Zimbabwe, each selecting the top three contestants from their respective provinces to compete; however, only 16 candidates participated in the national final round.

The pageant consisted of three segments: the swimwear, cocktail wear, and corporate wear competitions, which was solely managed by former Miss Zimbabwe 2010, Samantha Tshuma, with Chris Vukani as the public relations officer. It was also considered, as of 2024, the only edition of this national pageant.

== Result ==
Position	Delegate
Miss Grand Zimbabwe 2013	Bulawayo — Fungai Mawada
1st runner-up	Matabeleland South — Nothando Ncube
2nd runner-up	Matabeleland North — Grace Ncube
3rd runner-up	Harare — Voleen Ngulube
4th runner-up	Midlands — Tina Maphosa

== Scandals ==
After winning the title, Mawada was later disqualified on September 2, 2013, by the director Samantha Tshuma, who also nominated herself as the country representative for the international contest; Tshuma additionally stated that all 16 participating models were not suitable for the international competition. The action caused her to receive negative opinions from several modeling agencies that sent the girls to participate.

Tshuma was placed as the Top 20 finalist in the Miss Grand International 2013 pageant, held in Thailand on November 19.
