= Shirley Nyanyiwa =

Shirley Nyanyiwa (now Shirley Chingoka) is a Zimbabwean beauty pageant titleholder who made history as the first Black woman to be crowned Miss Zimbabwe in 1980. Her victory was a significant cultural moment in the country's history, occurring just months after the country gained independence from Britain.

== Pageantry and Career ==
Nyanyiwa was crowned Miss Zimbabwe 1980 at the age of 22. Before entering the pageant, she worked as a telex operator for British Airways.

Following her national victory, she traveled to London to represent Zimbabwe at the Miss World 1980 pageant, held at the Royal Albert Hall on November 13, 1980. She performed well on the international stage, placing among the top 15 finalists.

== Historical Significance ==
Her crowning marked a significant shift in the Zimbabwean fashion and beauty industry, reflecting the "New Zimbabwe" era. She remains a celebrated figure in the history of the competition for breaking racial barriers in national pageantry.
