= Miss Grand Zimbabwe =

Beauty pageant in Zimbabwe

- Formation: July 13, 2013; 12 years ago
- Type: Beauty pageant
- Headquarters: Durban
- Location: South Africa
- Members: Miss Grand International
- Official language: English
- National directors: Ntombifuthi Gumede; Tumi Jaine (2025)

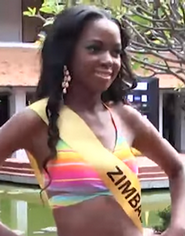
Lillie Chopamba
Miss Grand Zimbabwe 2014

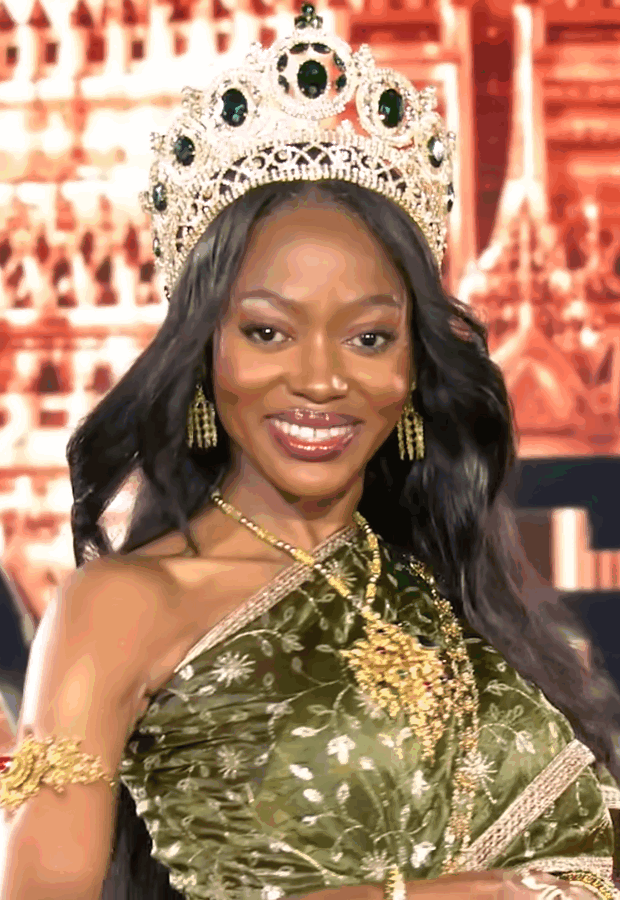
Chelsea Mandizha
Miss Grand Zimbabwe 2025

Miss Grand Zimbabwe was a Zimbabwean female national beauty pageant founded in 2013 by former Miss Zimbabwe Samantha Tshuma. The contest's winners represent the country at the Miss Grand International pageant. In 2014, Tshuma relinquished her post as director for her partner, Chris Vukani Mhlanga. After two consecutive years of scandal, the partnership with Miss Grand International was terminated the following year and the license was later purchased by Culvin Mavunga in 2016 but no representative was sent that year.

Zimbabwe only participated in the Miss Grand International pageant in 2013 and 2014, and its 2013 representative, Samantha Thsuma, was named the final-20. After that, another national pageant winner, Miss Zimbabwe Grand, was expected to participate but withdrew.

== History ==
In addition to Thailand, Zimbabwe is one of the few countries that separately held its Miss Grand national contest to select the representative for Miss Grand International in 2013. This inaugural edition of Miss Grand Zimbabwe was organized at the Gardens Restaurant in the city of Bulawayo under the directorship of former Miss Zimbabwe 2010, Samantha Tshuma, and a 22-years-old model representing Bulawayo, Fungai Mawada, was announced the winner at a contest held on July 13, outclassing 15 other finalists.

Nevertheless, Mawada was later disqualified on September 2 by the director Samantha Tshuma, who nominated herself as the country representative at such an international contest and additionally stated that all 16 participating models were not suitable for the international competition, causing her to receive negative opinions from several regional licensees. Tshuma was placed as the Top 20 finalist in the swimsuit competition at the Miss Grand International 2013 pageant, which was held in Thailand on November 19.

The following year, the Miss Grand Zimbabwe organization was also embroiled in a similar scandal when the new franchise holder, Chris Vukani Mhlanga, who was the partner of a former 2013 national licensee, unveiled a new country representative, Lillie Chopamba, to replace Marble Nyathi, one of the finalists who had been nominated from Bulawayo to represent the country at the Miss Grand International 2014 in Bangkok. Mhlanga claimed Nyathi's body was not good enough for the international pageant; however, Nyathi argued that she was removed because she refused Mhlanga's love proposal as well as some financial issues between her and the organizer. Zimbabwe was then absent from the Miss Grand International from 2015 to 2024, although there was the other national pageant with a similar name, Miss Zimbabwe Grand, has been held annually since 2019 to determine the winners for several international platforms, but has no affiliation with Miss Grand International.

After a 10-year hiatus, Zimbabwe is expected to make a return in 2025 under the directorship of Ntombi Gumede and her daughter, Tumi Jiane.

== Editions ==
The Miss Grand Zimbabwe pageant was held as a stand-alone contest only once, that is, in 2013.

Edition	Date	Final venue	Entrants	Result			Ref.
Edition	Date	Final venue	Entrants	Winner	1st runner-up	2nd runner-up	Ref.
1st	13 July 2013	Gardens Restaurant, Bulawayo	16	Fungai Mawada (Bulawayo)	Nothando Ncube (Matabeleland South)	Grace Ncube (Matabeleland North)	

== International competition ==
The following is a list of Zimbabwe representatives at the Miss Grand International contest.

Color keys

- : Declared as the winner
- : Ended as a runner-up (Top 5)
- : Ended as a finalist (Top 10)
- : Ended as a semifinalist (Top 20/21)
- : Ended as special awards winner

Year	Miss Grand Zimbabwe	Original Title (Note: Title obtained from national contest, not by appointment)	Placement	Special Awards	National Director
2025	Chelsea Rose Mandizha	Appointed	Unplaced		Ntombifuthi Gumede
Did not compete between 2022-2024
2021	Scholastica Makoni	Miss Zimbabwe Grand 2021	The organizer did not hold the license of Miss Grand International for Zimbabwe.		Farai Zembeni
2020	Kimberly Mayoyo	Miss Zimbabwe Grand 2020	The organizer did not hold the license of Miss Grand International for Zimbabwe.		Farai Zembeni
Did not compete between 2017-2019
2016	Dion Cooper	Miss Grand Zimbabwe 2016 (Note: Supplement title at the Miss United Continent Zimbabwe 2016 pageant.)	Did not compete		Culvin Mavunga
Did not compete in 2015
2014	Marble Nyathi	Appointed	Did not compete		Chris Vukani Mhlanga
2014	Lillie Chopamba	Appointed	Unplaced		Chris Vukani Mhlanga
2013	Fungai Mawada	Miss Grand Zimbabwe 2013	Did not compete		Samantha Thsuma
2013	Samantha Thsuma	Miss Zimbabwe 2010	Top 20		Samantha Thsuma
