= Miss Belgium 2023 =

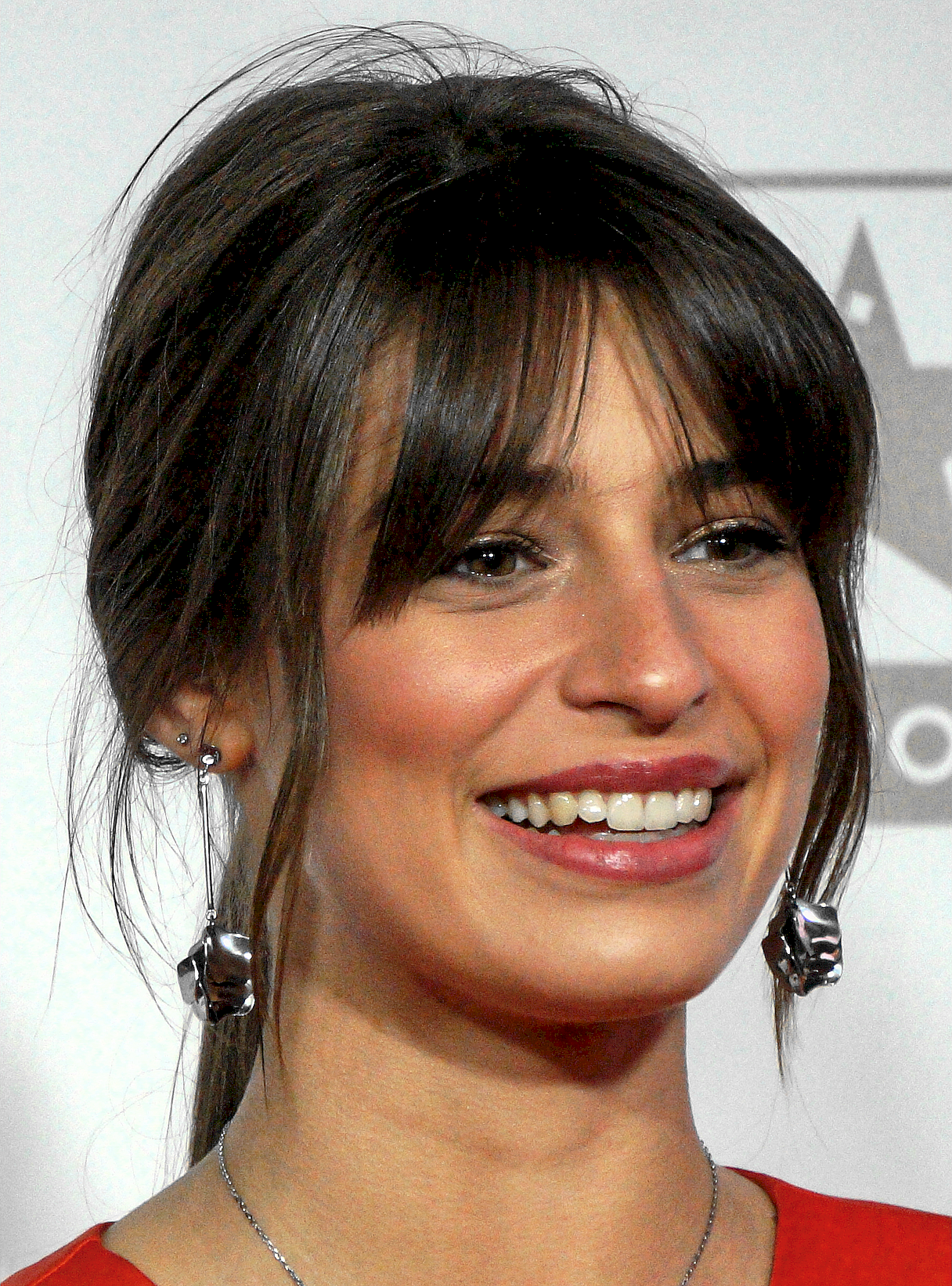
- Date: February 11, 2023
- Venue: Plopsaland Theater, De Panne, Belgium
- Broadcaster: Eclips TV
- Entrants: 32
- Winner: Emilie Vansteenkiste; Flemish Brabant

Miss Belgium 2023 was the 55th edition of the Miss Belgium pageant, held on February 11, 2023, at the Plopsaland Theater in De Panne, Belgium. Because of the absence of reigning Miss Belgium, Chayenne Van Aarle, Miss Belgium 2021 Kedist Deltour crowned Emilie Vansteenkiste of Flemish Brabant at end of the event. Vansteenkiste represented Belgium at the Miss Universe 2023 pageant, but did not place.

The Miss Belgium organisation had to deal with misfortune starting the last week before the event. Reigning Miss Belgium, Chayenne Van Aarle, had a major car accident a few days before the event. She wasn't present at the event because she still had to recover. The event was postponed a few hours before the start because suspicions of a terrorist attack. A suspect was arrested, weapons were found in his car and after the venue was fully searched by the police, the show started with a delay.

== Results ==
| Final Results | Contestant |
|---|---|
| Miss Belgium 2023 | Flemish Brabant — Emilie Vansteenkiste |
| 1st Runner-Up | West Flanders — Claire Lansenebre |
| 2nd Runner-Up | Walloon Brabant — Victoria Kembukuswa |
| 3rd Runner-Up | Liège — Cécile Deltour |
| 4th Runner-Up | Limburg — Haïfa Salem Ali |
| 5th Runner-Up | Namur — Léna Forseille |

=== Special awards ===
| Award | Contestant |
|---|---|
| Miss Talent | West Flanders — Claire Lansenebre |
| Miss Beach | Walloon Brabant — Victoria Kembukuswa |
| Miss Social Media | Limburg — Eva Keusters |
| Miss Sport | Namur — Solyne Husson |
| Miss Charity | West Flanders — Claire Lansenebre |
| Miss Model | Flemish Brabant — Emilie Vansteenkiste |

== Contestants ==
| Province | Contestant | Age | Hometown |
|---|---|---|---|
| Antwerp | Caprice Coyne | 19 | Geel |
| Antwerp | Marlies Peeters | 20 | Lint |
| Antwerp | Nell Joostens | 25 | Lint |
| Antwerp | Ailani Ibens | 17 | Antwerp |
| Brussels | Beyza Ozciftci | 21 | Schaerbeek |
| East Flanders | Cheany Van der Jeugt | 24 | Buggenhout |
| East Flanders | Lena Gonzales Blanco | 21 | Aalst |
| East Flanders | Demmi Van Bossche | 25 | Eeklo |
| East Flanders | Esmée Van Walle | 25 | De Klinge |
| East Flanders | Elise Casier | 19 | Gent |
| Flemish Brabant | Noa Kiekens | 22 | Liedekerke |
| Flemish Brabant | Emilie Vansteenkiste | 21 | Elewijt |
| Hainaut | Silva Hakobyan | 25 | Quaregnon |
| Hainaut | Perrine Blampain | 22 | Neufmaison |
| Hainaut | Valentine Roger | 19 | Cuesmes |
| Liège | Noémie Rosato | 25 | Nandrin |
| Liège | Kessia-Simao Viera | 21 | Verviers |
| Liège | Cécile Deltour | 25 | Dison |
| Limburg | Christina Lalomia | 19 | Genk |
| Limburg | Haïfa Salem Ali | 20 | Bilzen |
| Limburg | Charlotte Van Den Berghe | 26 | Heusden |
| Limburg | Amy Rombaut | 19 | Nieuwerkerken |
| Limburg | Eva Keusters | 25 | Tessenderlo |
| Luxembourg | Gwendoline Gouverneur | 22 | Durbuy |
| Namur | Solyne Husson | 22 | Yvoir |
| Namur | Léna Forseille | 18 | Temploux |
| Namur | Leia Van Hove | 20 | Franière |
| Walloon Brabant | Victoria Kembukuswa | 19 | Waterloo |
| Walloon Brabant | Lara Viegas | 19 | Nivelles |
| West Flanders | Claire Lansenebre | 24 | Knokke-Heist |
| West Flanders | Sjoukje Degraeve | 24 | Torhout |
| West Flanders | Janah Vanderper | 25 | Roeselare |
