= Miss Portugal =

National beauty pageant competition in Portugal

A Organização Concurso Nacional de Beleza Portugal
- Formation: 1926; 100 years ago
- Type: Beauty pageant
- Headquarters: Lisbon
- Location: Portugal
- Members: Miss Universe
- Official language: Portuguese
- President: Ricardo Monteverde
- Website: msportugal.org

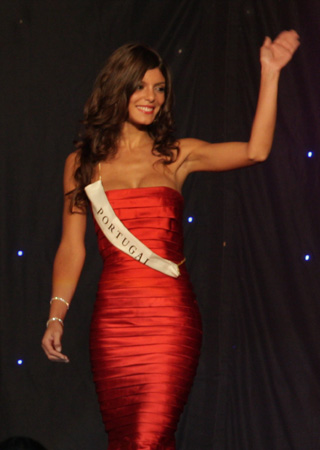
Miss Portugal 2008 Andreia Rodrigues during Miss World 2008

Miss Portugal is the oldest national pageant in Portugal since 1926. The main winner will represent the country at Miss Universe pageant.

== History ==
The Miss Portugal started in 1926 with Margarida Bastos Ferreira. Began 1960 the organization took a part at Miss Universe, the runners-up went to Miss World and Miss International and occasionally a candidate sent to Miss Europe beauty pageant. RTP - Rádio e Televisão de Portugal made the organization run for Portuguese Beauty pageant in Portugal for long time and from RTP, a second runner-up of Miss Portugal 1996 Fernanda Alves earned Portugal's first Miss International crown. In 2002, the pageant ended the production and no more Portuguese at Miss Universe pageant.

In 2011 the new pageant held as Miss Universo Portugal contest and it continued in 2014 as a beginning from Miss República Portuguesa by Isidiro de Brito Directorship. In 2014 the Portuguese representative at Miss Universe will be crowned at Miss Universo Portugal competition (separate contest but still in under Isidiro de Brito directorship). Between 2018 and 2021 the Miss Universo Portugal title crowned in Miss República Portuguesa pageant.

Began 2022 CNB Portugal - Concurso Nacional de Beleza took over the brand of Miss Portugal and remarked the Miss Portugal back in Portugal. The main winner will have opportunity to represent Portugal at Miss Universe.

== CNB Portugal ==
Meanwhile, CNB Portugal is the main organization of Miss Portugal since 2022 and in that organization there are some local pageants under that organization such as Miss Queen Portugal, Miss Teen Portugal, Mrs Portugal and Top Model Portugal.

- Miss Queen Portugal' whose main legacy are environmental causes, follows the platform of the Miss Earth Foundation. The winner of Miss Queen Portugal is the Portuguese representative in the Miss Earth pageant, which is one of the Big Four international beauty pageants in the world.
- Miss Teen Portugal is a local pageant for teenagers in Portugal. There some licenses here for the titleholders such as Miss Teen International. Miss Teen Globe, Miss Teen Petite etc.
- Mrs Portugal is a local pageant for mothers in Portugal. The main winner represents Portugal at Mrs Universe pageant.
- Top Model Portugal' is a local pageant for Modeling career in Portugal.

== Miss Universe license holder in Portugal ==
- RTP - Rádio e Televisão de Portugal (Miss Portugal) (1960—2002)
- GAETA, Promoções e Eventos, Lda. and NIU (2011)
- Edward Walson (Miss Universo Portugal) (2015—2017)
- Isidro de Brito (Miss República Portuguesa) (2014, 2018–2021)
- Ricardo Monteverde (CNB Portugal - Ms Portugal) (2022—present)

== Titleholders ==
Year	A Organização Miss Portugal	District	Notes
1926	Margarida Bastos Ferreira	Lisbon	Represented Portugual at the 1927 International Pageant of Pulchritude
1930	Fernanda Gonçalves	Lisbon	
1931	Senhorina Maldonado	Lisbon	
1959	María Teresa Motoa Cardoso	Lisbon	RTP - Rádio e Televisão de Portugal directorship
1960	Maria Josabete Silva Santos	Lisbon	
1961	Maria Santos Trindade	Lisbon	
1965	Maria do Carmo Sancho	Lisbon	
1970	Ana Maria Diozo Lucas	Lisbon	
1971	Maria Celmira Pereira	Angola	
1972	Iris Maria dos Santos	Mozambique	
1973	Carla de Barros	Lisbon	
1974	Ana Paula da Silva Freitas	Lisbon	
1979	Marta Mendonça Gouvêia	Lisbon	
1980	Paula Machado de Moura	Lisbon	
1981	Ana Maria Valdiz Wilson	Lisbon	
1982	Anabela Elisa Vissenjou	Lisbon	
1983	Maria Fátima Rodrigues	Lisbon	
1984	Alexandra Paula Gomes	Lisbon	
1985	Mariana Dias Carriço	Lisbon	
1986	Noélia Cristina Chaves	Lisbon	
1987	Isabel Rodrigues Martins	Lisbon	
1988	Ana Francisca Gonçalves	Lisbon	
1989	Maria Angélica Rosado	Setúbal	
1990	Carla Caldeira	Setúbal	
1991	Maria Fernanda Silva	Lisbon	
1992	Carla Marisa da Cruz	Angola	
1993	Mónica Sofia Borges	Lisbon	
1994	Adrianna Iria	Faro	
1995	Rita Carvalho	Bragança	
1996	Lara Antunes	Lisbon	
1997	Icília Berenguel	Porto	The Miss Portugal 1997 presenter called wrong to Icília as the 2nd Runner-up but after some minutes, Icília called as the winner
1998	Marisa Ferreira	Santarém	
1999	Licinia Macedo	Madeira	
2000	Thelma Santos	Lisbon	
2001	Iva Lamarão	Ovar	
2012	Daniela Assis Barreira		
2022	Telma Ramos Madeira	Porto	Ricardo Montevero took over the brand of Miss Portugal began 2022
2023	Marina Machete Reis	Setúbal	First Transgender woman to win Miss Portugal and to place as a Top 20 at Miss Universe 2023
2024	Andreia Correia	Lisbon	

== Titleholders at Miss Universe pageant ==
- : Declared as Winner
- : Ended as runner-up or top 5/6 qualification
- : Ended as one of the finalists or semifinalists
- : Ended as special awards winner

Before 2011 Miss Portugal 1959 to Miss Portugal 2001 winner participated at Miss Universe competition. Between 2002 and 2010 there was no franchise holder to sign up the Miss Universe organization. began 2011 the new pageant held as 'Miss Universo Portugal" contest and it continued in 2014 as a beginning from Miss República Portuguesa by Isidiro de Brito Directorship.

Year	District	Miss Portugal	Placement at Miss Universe	Special Award(s)	Notes
Ricardo Montevero directorship — a franchise holder to Miss Universe from 2022
2026	Porto	Isabella Santos	TBA		
2025	Setúbal	Camila Vitorino	Unplaced		
2024	Lisbon	Andreia Correia	Unplaced		
2023	Setúbal	Marina Machete Reis	Top 20		First Transgender woman to place as a semifinalist at Miss Universe.
2022	Porto	Telma Ramos Madeira	Top 16		
Isidro de Brito directorship — a franchise holder to Miss Universe between 2018―2021
2021	Lisbon	Oricia Domínguez	Unplaced		Oricia was 2nd Runner-up at Miss Venezuela 2018, representing Táchira.
2020	Porto	Cristiana Silva Alves	Unplaced		Appointed — Due to the impact of COVID-19 pandemic, no national pageant in 2020.
2019	Braga	Sylvie Da Costa Silva	Top 20		
2018	Setúbal	Filipa Barroso	Unplaced		
Edward Wilson directorship — a franchise holder to Miss Universe between 2016―2017
2017	Setúbal	Matilde Ramos Lima	Unplaced		
2016	Madeira	Flávia Joana Brito	Unplaced		Flavia was Continental Queen of Europe at Miss Tourism World 2013.
Isidro de Brito directorship — a franchise holder to Miss Universe between 2014―2015
2015	Azores	Emilia Araújo	Unplaced		
2014	Aveiro	Patrícia Carvalho Da Silva	Unplaced		
GAETA, Promoções e Eventos, Lda. and NIU directorship — a franchise holder to Miss Universe in 2011
Did not compete between 2012—2013
2011	Lisbon	Laura Gonçalves da Câmara	Top 10	Internet Vote	
Rádio e Televisão de Portugal directorship — a franchise holder to Miss Universe between 1960―2002
Did not compete between 2003—2010
2002	Ovar	Iva Lamarão	Unplaced		
2001	Setúbal	Claúdia Jesus Lopez Borges	Unplaced		Miss Portugal 2000 1st Runner-up; for personal reasons, Thelma Santos was the Miss Portugal 2000 who withdrew at the Miss Universe 2001; Claudia Borges (a runner-up) replaced her position, Claudia competed at Miss World 2001.
2001	Lisbon	Thelma Santos	Did not compete		
2000	Madeira	Licinia Macedo	Unplaced		
1999	Santarém	Marisa Ferreira	Unplaced	Miss Congeniality	
1998	Porto	Icília Berenguel	Unplaced		The Miss Portugal 1997 presenter called wrong to Icília as the 2nd Runner-up but after some minutes, Icília called as the winner.
1997	Lisbon	Lara Antunes	Unplaced		
1996	Bragança	Rita Carvalho	Unplaced		
1995	Faro	Adrianna Iria	Unplaced		
1994	Lisbon	Mónica Sofia Borges	Unplaced		
1993	Angola	Carla Marisa da Cruz	Unplaced		
1992	Lisbon	Maria Fernanda Silva	Unplaced		
1991	Setúbal	Carla Caldeira	Did not compete		
1990	Setúbal	Maria Angélica Rosado	Unplaced		
1989	Lisbon	Ana Francisca Gonçalves	Unplaced		
1988	Lisbon	Isabel Rodrigues Martins	Unplaced		
1987	Lisbon	Noélia Cristina Chaves	Unplaced		
1986	Lisbon	Mariana Dias Carriço	Unplaced		
1985	Lisbon	Alexandra Paula Gomes	Unplaced		
1984	Lisbon	Maria Fátima Rodrigues	Unplaced		
1983	Lisbon	Anabela Elisa Vissenjou	Unplaced		
1982	Lisbon	Ana Maria Valdiz Wilson	Unplaced		
1981	Lisbon	Paula Machado de Moura	Unplaced		
Did not compete between 1975—1980
1974	Lisbon	Ana Paula da Silva Freitas	Unplaced		
1973	Lisbon	Carla de Barros	Unplaced		
1972	Mozambique	Iris Maria dos Santos	Unplaced		
1971	Angola	Maria Celmira Pereira	Unplaced		
1970	Lisbon	Ana Maria Diozo Lucas	Unplaced		
Did not compete between 1966—1969
1965	Lisbon	Maria do Carmo Sancho	Unplaced		
Did not compete between 1963—1964
1962	Lisbon	Maria Santos Trindade	Unplaced		
1961	Lisbon	Maria Josabete Silva Santos	Did not compete		Allocated to Miss International 1960.
1960	Lisbon	María Teresa Motoa Cardoso	Unplaced		

== See also ==
- Miss República Portuguesa
