= Marielia Zaloumi =

Greek model

- Born: 2002 or 2003 (age 23–24); Athens, Greece
- Occupation: Model
- Height: 1.80 m (5 ft 11 in)
- Beauty pageant titleholder
- Title: Miss Universe Greece 2023
- Major competitions: Star GS Hellas 2023 (Winner); Miss Universe 2023 (Unplaced)

Marielia Zaloumi is a Greek model and beauty pageant titleholder who was crowned Miss Universe Greece 2023 and served as the country's delegate to the Miss Universe 2023 pageant.

== Pageantry ==
=== Miss Universe 2023 ===
Zaloumi was crowned Star GS Hellas 2023 (Miss Universe Greece 2023) in a national competition held on Thursday, September 28, 2023, at Vegas Live Stage in Tavros.

She succeeded 2022's winner Korina Emmanouilidou. She represented Greece with the national flag at The 72nd Miss Universe 2023 in El Salvador. After her win, she wrote on Instagram: "I would like whoever sees this post to never stop striving for their goals whatever they are. I will try to represent our country in the best way possible. I do not represent myself, but every Greek and every Greek woman around the world."

== Awards ==
Awards and achievements
Preceded by Maria Minoudi	Miss Universe Greece; 2023	Succeeded by Christianna Katsieri
