= Emilie Vansteenkiste =

Belgian model (born 2001)

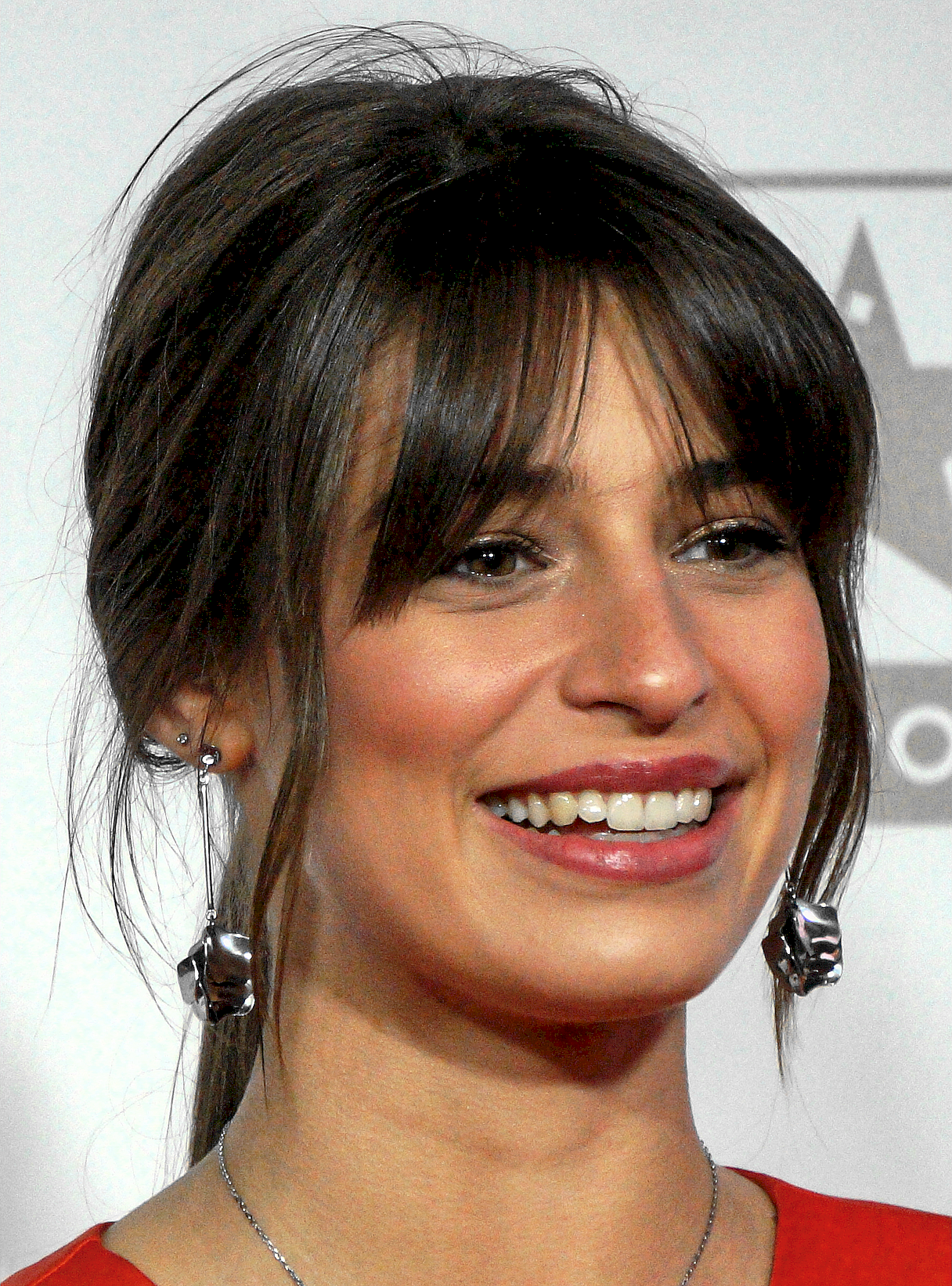
- Born: 25 October 2001 (age 24); Elewijt, Belgium
- Occupation: Model
- Height: 1.77 m (5 ft 9 1/2 in)
- Beauty pageant titleholder
- Title: Miss Belgium 2023
- Major competitions: Miss Belgium 2023 (Winner); Miss Universe 2023 (Unplaced)

Emilie Vansteenkiste (born 25 October 2001) is a Belgian model and beauty pageant titleholder who was crowned Miss Belgium 2023. She represented her country at Miss Universe 2023 pageant.

== Background ==
=== Early life ===
Vansteenkiste was born in Elewijt a small village in the municipality of Zemst, Flemish Brabant, Belgium. Her mother died and she has expressed it in the press interview.

== Pageantry ==
=== Miss Belgium ===
The road to Miss Belgium 2023 election was hard with the horror accident of the previous title holder, Miss Belgium 2022, Chayenne Van Aarle and a threat of terror attack on the day of the coronation. Hours before the coronation, the Limburg police received an information that a man was on his way to the venue to carry out his terror attack. Massive federal police were deployed on-site and the suspect was apprehended. Once the venue is declared safe, the program has commenced.

At the end of the event, 21-year old Vansteenkiste from Elewijt was crowned as the new Miss Belgium.

=== Miss Universe 2023 ===
Vansteenkiste represented Belgium with the national flag at The 72nd Miss Universe 2023 in El Salvador at the pageant venue Adolfo Pineda National Gymnasium (Gimnasio Nacional Adolfo Pineda) on 18 November 2023.

Awards and achievements
| Preceded by Chayenne van Aarle | Miss Belgium; 2023 | Succeeded by Kenza Ameloot |
