= Lorena Santen =

Swiss beauty peagant

Lorena Santen (née Mameli, born 24 June 1997) is a model, beauty pageant titleholder and banker. She held the title of Miss Universe Switzerland.

== Personal life ==
Lorena Santen was born in Wettingen, in the Canton of Aargau, Switzerland.

Santen trained as a bank clerk and graduated from the Zurich University of Applied Sciences (ZHAW) with a Bachelor of Science in Business Administration. She has worked in the Swiss banking sector for over ten years at UBS bank.

Santen married in 2022. The wedding celebration was held at the prestigious The Dolder Grand in Zurich.

In September 2024, Santen gave birth to a son.

== Pageantry ==
=== Miss Universe Switzerland / Miss Switzerland ===
In September 2023, Santen was crowned Miss Universe Switzerland and Miss Switzerland.

=== 72nd Miss Universe ===
Lorena Santen represented Switzerland at the 72nd Miss Universe Competition in El Salvador on 18 November 2023.

She made history as the first married woman from Switzerland and from Europe to ever compete in the Miss Universe competition and the first ever Miss Universe contestant and titleholder in a major beauty pageant to give birth and become a mother during her reign.

Her national costume, which was inspired by the Swiss Guard, gained widespread recognition. Media outlets like CNN and Hola! praised it as one of the highlights of the competition's National Costume Show. Her performance and costume was also well-received and positively acknowledged by the Vatican and the Swiss Guard.
