= Brooke Bruk-Jackson =

Zimbabwean model who was crowned Miss Universe Zimbabwe 2023

- Born: Harare, Zimbabwe
- Occupation: Model
- Height: 1.83 m (6 ft 0 in)
- Beauty pageant titleholder
- Title: Miss Universe Zimbabwe 2023
- Major competitions: Miss Universe Zimbabwe 2023 (Winner); Miss Universe 2023 (Unplaced)

Brooke Bruk-Jackson (born 26 July 2002) is a Zimbabwean model and beauty pageant titleholder who won Miss Universe Zimbabwe 2023. She represented Zimbabwe at Miss Universe 2023.

== Early life and education ==
Bruk-Jackson was born in Harare to a white Zimbabwean family of five, the daughter of Tracey Evans Bruk-Jackson, and raised in the Newlands suburb. Bruk-Jackson was educated at Chisipite Senior School in Harare, and afterwards went on to attend the British Academy of Fashion Design in London and the Beauty Therapy Institute in Cape Town. After finishing her education, Bruk-Jackson went on to work as a beauty therapist in Cape Town. In addition to English, she also speaks Shona.

Bruk-Jackson has also worked as a model in Zimbabwe and South Africa since 2019, having first been scouted by South African modeling agency Boss Models in 2017.

== Pageantry ==
On 16 September 2023, Bruk-Jackson won her first pageant Miss Universe Zimbabwe 2023. As part of her prize package, Bruk-Jackson received a USD10,000 cash prize, a trip to Victoria Falls, a one-year contract with clothing company Hilz Couture, a spa treatment, two years of accommodation, beauty products, and air tickets to and from Central America, while also becoming a brand ambassador for several sponsoring companies. Bruk-Jackson represented Zimbabwe at Miss Universe 2023, marking the nation's first appearance at the competition since Miss Universe 2001.

Following her win as Miss Universe Zimbabwe, Bruk-Jackson went viral due to her identity as a white Zimbabwean and status as the only white contestant at Miss Universe Zimbabwe 2023, with international audiences criticising her win in a Zimbabwean pageant, which is home to a primarily black African population. In response to the controversy, Bruk-Jackson was largely defended by the Zimbabwean media.

Awards and achievements
Preceded by Tsungai Muswerakuenda	Miss Universe Zimbabwe; 2023	Succeeded by Sakhile Dube
