= Miss Rhodesia =

Beauty pageant

Miss Rhodesia was the national beauty pageant of Rhodesia and its antecedents. It debuted in Miss World in 1959, but was not allowed to participate after Rhodesia's Unilateral Declaration of Independence in 1965. When Rhodesia transitioned to a majority democracy and became Zimbabwe in 1980, Miss Rhodesia became Miss Zimbabwe.

== History ==
Miss Rhodesia was established as Miss Rhodesia and Nyasaland in 1959. The winner debuted at Miss World 1959, with Vivien Lentin placing as a semifinalist. In 1960, Jenny Lee Scott appeared at Miss World. In 1961, there were two "Miss Rhodesias," when Angela Moorcroft competed at Miss World representing Rhodesia and Nyasaland, and Jonee Sierra representing Southern Rhodesia at Miss Universe. In 1965, Lesley Bunting represented Rhodesia at Miss World 1965, just days after the country declared independence from the United Kingdom. Despite this, Bunting was still able to participate, and she was a Top 7 Finalist that year.

After 1965, Miss Rhodesia was no longer allowed to participate in Miss World, due to Rhodesia's political situation. Despite this, in 1972 the English-born Miss Rhodesia attempted to travel to Britain to compete in Miss World, but was barred entry, despite her British citizenship. Four years later, when Miss Rhodesia Jane Bird flew to London and attempted to participate in Miss World 1976, she was prevented by the organization. In 1980, when Rhodesia reverted to a British colony and was renamed Zimbabwe, Miss Rhodesia ended and was succeeded by Miss Zimbabwe

== List of titleholders ==
Helen Elliott and Myra Fowler held the Miss Rhodesia title, but the sources do not include the year.

Year	Miss Rhodesia	Hometown	Notes and references
1959	Vivien Lentin	-	Semifinalist at Miss World 1959 (Miss Rhodesia and Nyasaland)
1960	Jenny Lee Scott	-	Competed at Miss World 1960 (Miss Southern Rhodesia)
1961	Angela Moorcroft	-	Competed at Miss World 1961 (Miss Rhodesia and Nyasaland)
1961	Jonee Sierra	-	Competed at Miss Universe 1961 (Miss Southern Rhodesia)
1962	-	-	
1963	-	-	
1964	-	-	
1965	Lesley Bunting	Salisbury	Top 7 Finalist at Miss World 1965
1966	-	-	
1967	-	-	
1968	-	-	
1969	-	-	
1970	-	-	
1971	Corinne Prinsloo	-	
1972	Helga Vera Johns	-	Was not allowed to compete in Miss World 1972 despite having dual citizenship with the UK. Johns later moved to South Africa and won the 1975 Miss South Africa contest and tried to compete again at Miss World 1975, but was barred entry due to not living in South Africa for 5 years as per the requirements of the Miss World Organization. Johns, to this day, remains the only person barred from entering the contest at least twice.
1973	Beverley Donald	-	Mother of Chelsy Davy
1974	-	-	-
1975	Trudy Cliffe	-	
1976	Jane Bird	-	Bird attempted to participate in Miss World 1976, but was barred because of Rhodesia's political and diplomatic situation
1977	Connie Makaya	-	First black Miss Rhodesia
1978	Blessed Unami Sikhosana	Bulawayo	
1979	-	-	-
1980	Miss Rhodesia became Miss Zimbabwe in 1980		
