= Zuheilyn Clemente =

Honduran model and beauty pageant titleholder (born 2000)

- Born: 29 September 2000 (age 26); Tegucigalpa, Honduras
- Occupation: Model
- Height: 1.78 m (5 ft 10 in)
- Beauty pageant titleholder
- Title: Miss Honduras 2023
- Major competitions: Miss Honduras 2023 (Winner); Miss Universe 2023 (Unplaced)

Zuheilyn Clemente (born 29 September 2000) is a Honduran model and beauty pageant titleholder who was crowned Miss Honduras 2023 and represented her country at Miss Universe 2023 pageant.

== Background ==
=== Early life ===
Clemente was born in Tegucigalpa, where she studied at Dowal School until her high school diploma. Nowadays she is completing her degree and works as a model.

== Pageantry ==
=== Miss Universe 2023 ===
Clemente represented Honduras with the national flag at upcoming The 72nd Miss Universe 2023 in El Salvador at the pageant venue Adolfo Pineda National Gymnasium (Gimnasio Nacional Adolfo Pineda) on Saturday November 18, 2023 where Miss Universe 2022, R'Bonney Gabriel crown Sheynnis Palacios as her successor at the end of Grand Finale.

== Awards and achievements ==
Awards and achievements
Preceded by Rebeca Rodríguez Mora	Miss Honduras; 2023	Incumbent
