= Star GS Hellas =

National beauty pageant competition in Greece

Star & Mr GS Hellas Organization Star GS Hellas, Miss GS Hellas, Mr GS Hellas Σταρ ΓΣ Ελλάς, Μις ΓΣ Ελλάς, κύριος ΓΣ Ελλάς
- Formation: 2011; 15 years ago
- Type: Beauty pageant
- Headquarters: Athens
- Location: Greece
- Members: Miss Universe; Miss Earth; Miss Supranational; Mister Supranational; Miss Intercontinental
- Official language: Greek
- President: George Kouvaris
- Website: Official website

Star GS Hellas (Greek: Σταρ ΓΣ Ελλάς;) is a national beauty pageant responsible for selecting Greece's representative to the Miss Universe and Mister Supranational pageant. The first Miss Universe Greece pageant was titled in 2021.

== History ==
The first Star Hellas at Miss Universe competition took place in 1952. In the 1970s and early 1980s, the pageant was broadcast every year by the Ellinikí Radiofonía Tileórasi. From 1990 to 2010, it was funded and broadcast on Greece's private network ANT1.

The Miss Universe Greece expects to hold a pageant with the motto "confidently beautiful". The winner will be the entrant to Miss Universe each year. Greece did not compete in 1988, 2016 and 2017.

== Titleholders ==
Winner International Title
Miss Universe Greece
Miss Earth Greece
Miss Supranational Greece
Miss Intercontinental Greece
Mister Supranational Greece

Year	Star GS Hellas	Miss GS Hellas	B Star GS Hellas	B Miss GS Hellas	Mr GS Hellas
2011	Penelope Stamatakou	Afroditi Vlanti	x	Marianna Nikolaou	Debuted 2014
2012	Elli Pournara	Vanesa Pitsiou	Katerina Floutkova	x	Debuted 2014
2013	Konstantina Kioussi	Elena Pappa	Elena Kostopoulou	Maria Ilina	Debuted 2014
2014	Athanasia Kofinioti	Jennie Lattou	Fay Zigouri	Maria Nestora	?
2015	Konstantina Koromila	Fotini Barnasa	Brenda Iacounina	Maria Petsi	Spyros Papakonstantinou
2016	Nansy Pitta	Stella Mizeraki	Katerina Skamptzova	Katerina Papasika	Sotiris Masouris
2017	Christina Moumouri	Marina Dimitropoulou	Irene Ligkori	Nelly Railan	Giorgos Tsotras
2018	Theodora Mosxouri	Konstantina Xaxlaki	Christina Eleftheriou	Konstantina Dima	Vasilis Simos
2019	Niki Alexandridou; Did not compete	Elpida Pazarakou	Ingrid Collani	Olga Malandraki	Andreas Botaitis
2020	Katerina Psychou	Labrini Tzanidaki	Angeliki Balogianni	Katerina Vetta	Spyros Nikolaidis
2021	Katerina Kouvoutsaki; Did not compete	Sofia Arapogianni	Georgia Nastou	Georgia Ampartzaki	Leonidas Amfilochios
2022	Korina Emmanouilido	Christianna Katsieri	Maria Minoudi	Maria-Ionna Spora	Mihalis Kolikas
2023	Marielia Zaloumi	Aphrodite Xynogalou	Melina Dromboni	x	Giannis Dolianitis
2025	Mary Chatzipavlou	Maria Manouri	Melina Miliou	Elina Zouridaki	x

== Representatives to international beauty pageants ==
=== Miss Universe Greece 2021—Present ===
- : Declared as Winner
- : Ended as runner-up or top 5/6 qualification
- : Ended as one of the finalists or semifinalists
- : Ended as special awards winner

Started in 2021. Star GS Hellas took over the license of Miss Universe. The winner represents Greece at the Miss Universe pageant. On occasion, when the winner does not qualify (due to age) for either contest, a runner-up is sent.

Year	Region	Miss Greece	Greek Name	Placement at Miss Universe	Special awards	Notes
George Kouvaris directorship — a franchise holder to Miss Universe from 2021
2026	North Aegean	Olivia Vasilopoulos	Ολίβια Βασιλοπούλου	TBA		
2025	Attica	Mary Chatzipavlou	Μαίρη Χατζηπαύλου	Unplaced		
2024	Attica	Christianna Katsieri	Χριστιάννα Κατσιέρη	Unplaced		Since no pageant in 2024, a runner-up of 2023, Christianna was appointed by Star GS Hellas to be the Miss Universe Greece 2024.
2023	Attica	Marielia Zaloumi	Μαριηλία Ζαλούμη	Unplaced		
2022	Western Macedonia	Korina Emmanouilidou	Κορίνα Εμμανουηλίδου	Unplaced		
2021	Ionian Islands	Sofia Arapogianni	Σοφία Αραπογιάννη	Unplaced		Miss GS Hellas 2021 — Designated as Miss Universe Greece after the original delegate refused to go to Miss Universe 2021.
2021	Attica	Katerina Kouvoutsaki	Κατερίνα Κουβουτσάκη	Did not compete		Star GS Hellas 2021; Withdrew — Due to health concerns, Katerina decided to cancel her participation at Miss Universe.

=== Star Hellas 1952—2018 ===
- : Declared as Winner
- : Ended as runner-up or top 5/6 qualification
- : Ended as one of the finalists or semifinalists
- : Ended as special awards winner

Year	Region	Star Hellas	Greek Name	Placement at Miss Universe	Special awards	Notes
Vassilis Prevelakis directorship — a franchise holder to Miss Universe between 2007―2020
2020	Central Macedonia	Rafaela Plastira	Ραφαέλα Πλαστήρα	Did not compete		Withdrew — Rafaela Plastira withdrew at Miss Universe 2020 due to the COVID-19 pandemic and refused to compete at Miss Universe 2021 due to the host country being Israel. And later on, due to license matters, Star Hellas lost the franchise of Miss Universe after many years of sending representatives to Miss Universe. Star GS Hellas took over the franchise license for Greece at Miss Universe.
2019	Attica	Erika Kolani	Έρρικα Κολάνη	Did not compete		Kolani was originally supposed to replace Plastira at Miss Universe 2019, but did not compete for unknown reasons. Kolani was Miss Hellas 2019
2019	Central Macedonia	Rafaela Plastira	Ραφαέλα Πλαστήρα	Did not compete		Allocated to Miss World 2019 and thus, did not compete at Miss Universe 2019. Was later designated for Miss Universe 2020. Plastira was Star Hellas 2019.
2018	Central Macedonia	Ioanna Bella	Ιωάννα Μπέλλα	Unplaced		
2017	Central Macedonia	Theodora Soukia	Θεοδώρα Σούκια	Did not compete		
Did not compete in 2016
2015	Attica	Mikaela Fotiadis	Μικαέλα Φωτιάδη	Unplaced		
2014	Attica	Ismini Dafopoulou	Ισμήνη Νταφοπούλου	Unplaced		
2013	Attica	Anastasia Sidiropoulou	Αναστασία Σιδηροπούλου	Unplaced		Anastasia was crowned Star Hellas 2013 in special case. Since the pageant postponed and in 2013 there was only 1 titleholder in Star Hellas formation.
2012	Central Macedonia	Vasiliki Tsirogianni	Βασιλική Τσιρογιάννη	Unplaced		
2011	Western Greece	Iliana Papageorgiou	Ηλιάνα Παπαγεωργίου	Unplaced		
2010	Central Macedonia	Anna Prelevic	Άννα Πρέλεβιτς	Unplaced		
2009	Attica	Viviana Kampanile	Βιβιάνα Καμπανίλε	Unplaced		
2008	Attica	Dionysia Koukiou	Διονυσία Κουκίου	Unplaced		
2007	Attica	Doukissa Nomikou	Δούκισσα Νομικού	Unplaced		
George Prevelakis directorship — a franchise holder to Miss Universe between 1952―2006
2006	Central Macedonia	Olympia Chopsonidou	Ολυμπία Χοψονίδου	Unplaced		
2005	Ionian Islands	Evagelia Aravani	Ευαγγελία Αραβανή	Top 15		
2004	Attica	Valia Kakouti	Βάλια Κακούτη	Unplaced		
2003	Central Macedonia	Marietta Chrousala	Μαριέττα Χρουσαλά	Top 15		
2002	Attica	Lena Paparigopoulou	Λένα Παπαρηγοπούλου	Unplaced		
2001	Attica	Evelina Papantoniou	Εβελίνα Παπαντωνίου	1st Runner-up		
2000	Attica	Heleni Skafida	Ελένη Σκαφιδά	Unplaced		
1999	Attica	Sofia Rapti	Σοφία Ράπτη	Unplaced		
1998	Attica	Dimitra Eginiti	Δήμητρα Αιγινήτη	Unplaced		
1997	Attica	Elina Zisi	Ελίνα Ζήση	Unplaced		
1996	Attica	Nina Georgala	Νίνα Γεωργαλά	Unplaced		
1995	Central Macedonia	Eleni Papaioannou	Ελένη Παπαϊωάννου	Unplaced		
1994	Attica	Rea Toutounzi	Ρέα Τουτουνζή	Top 10		
1993	Attica	Christina Manousi	Χριστίνα Μανούση	Unplaced		
1992	Central Macedonia	Marina Tsintikidou	Μαρίνα Τσιντικίδου	Unplaced		
1991	Attica	Marina Poupou	Μαρίνα Πούπου	Unplaced		
1990	Attica	Tzeni Balatsinou	Τζένη Μπαλατσινού	Unplaced		
1989	Attica	Christiana Latani	Χριστιάνα Λατάνη	Unplaced		
1988	Attica	Tereza Liakou	Τερέζα Λιάκου	Did not compete		
1987	Attica	Xenia Pantazi	Ξένια Πανταζή	Unplaced		
1986	Attica	Vasileia Mantaki	Βασιλεία Μαντάκη	Unplaced		
1985	Attica	Sabina Damianidou	Σαμπίνα Δαμιανίδου	Unplaced		
1984	Attica	Peggy Dogani	Πέγκυ Δογάνη	Unplaced		
1983	Attica	Plousia Farfaraki	Πλουσία Φαρφαράκη	Unplaced		
1982	Attica	Tina Roussou	Τίνα Ρούσσου	3rd Runner-up		
1981	Crete	Maria Nikoúli	Μαρία Νικούλη	Unplaced		
1980	Attica	Roula Kanellopoulou	Ρούλα Κανελλοπούλου	Unplaced		
1979	Attica	Katia Koukidou	Κάτια Κουκίδου	Unplaced		
1978	Central Macedonia	Marieta Kountouraki	Μαριέτα Κουντουράκη	Unplaced		
1977	Attica	Maria Spantidaki	Μαρία Σπαντάκη	Unplaced		
1976	Attica	Melina Michailidou	Μελίνα Μιχαηλίδου	Unplaced		
1975	Attica	Afroditi Katsouli	Αφροδίτη Κατσούλη	Unplaced		
1974	Attica	Lena Kleopa	Λένα Κλεόπα	Unplaced		
1973	Attica	Vana Papadaki	Βάνα Παπαδάκη	Top 12		
1972	Attica	Nancy Kapetanaki	Νάνσυ Καπετανάκη	Unplaced		
1971	Attica	Gely Karagianni	Γκέλυ Καραγιάννη	Unplaced		
1970	Attica	Angelique Bourlesi	Αγγελική Μπουρλέση	Top 15		
1969	Attica	Irini Diamantoglou	Ειρήνη Διαμάντογλου	Unplaced		
1968	Attica	Miranda Zafeiropoulou	Μιράντα Ζαφειροπούλου	Top 15		
1967	Attica	Elya Kalogeraki	Έλια Καλομοβάκη	Top 15	Miss Photogenic	
1966	Attica	Katia Balafouta	Κάτια Μπαλαφούτα	Unplaced		
1965	South Aegean	Aspa Theologitou	Άσπα Θεολογίτου	Top 15		
1964	Attica	Corinna Tsopei	Κορίννα Τσοπέη	Miss Universe 1964		
1963	North Aegean	Despina Orgeta	Δέσποινα Οργέτα	Unplaced		
1962	Attica	Christina Apostolou	Χριστίνα Αποστόλου	Unplaced		
1961	Attica	Ria Deloutsi	Ρία Δελούτση	Unplaced	Miss Congeniality	
1960	Attica	Magda Pasaloglou	Μάγδα Πασάλογλου	Top 15		
1959	Attica	Zoitsa Kouroukli	Ζωίτσα Κουρούκλη	Top 15		
1958	Attica	Marily Kalimopoulou	Μαρίλι Καλιμοπούλου	Top 15		
1957	Attica	Lygia Karavia	Λυγία Καραβία	Top 15		
1956	Attica	Rita Gouma	Ρίτα Γκούμα	Top 15		
1955	Attica	Sonia Zoidou	Σόνια Ζωίδου	Unplaced		
1954	Crete	Rika Diallina	Ρίκα Διαλινά	Top 16		
1953	Attica	Doreta Xirou	Ντορέτα Ξηρού	Unplaced		
1952	Attica	Ntaizy Mavraki	Νταίζυ Μαυράκη	2nd Runner-up		

=== Miss Earth Greece ===
- : Declared as Winner
- : Ended as runner-up
- : Ended as one of the finalists or semifinalists
- : Ended as special awards winner

Year	Region	Miss Earth Greece	Greek Name	Placement at Miss Earth	Special awards	Notes
George Kouvaris directorship — a franchise holder to Miss Earth from 2020
2024	Attica	Aphrodite Xynogalou	Αφροδίτη Ξυνόγαλου	Did not compete		
2023	Attica	Christianna Katsieri	Χριστιάννα Κατσιέρη	Unplaced		
2022	Attica	Georgia Nastou	Γεωργία Νάστου	Unplaced		
2021	Attica	Katerina Psichou	Κατερίνα Ψυχού	Unplaced		
2020	Epirus	Maria Fotou	Φωτογραφία Μαρία	Unplaced		Designated as Miss Earth Greece after the original delegate cannot go to Miss Earth 2020.
2020	Attica	Niki Alexandridou	Νίκη Αλεξανδρίδου	Did not compete		Withdrew from the title of Miss Earth Greece.

=== Miss Supranational Greece ===
- : Declared as Winner
- : Ended as runner-up
- : Ended as one of the finalists or semifinalists
- : Ended as special awards winner

Year	Region	Miss Supranational Greece	Greek Name	Placement at Miss Supranational	Special awards	Notes
George Kouvaris directorship — a franchise holder to Miss Supranational from 2021
2024	Attica	Melina Dromboni	Μελίνα Δρομπώνη	Did not compete		
2023	Central Macedonia	Maria Cholidou	Μαρία Χολίδου	Unplaced		
2022	Attica	Elisampeta Sofia Mpitsia (Eliza Sophia)	Ελισαμπέτα Σοφία Μπίτσια (Ελίζα Σοφία)	Unplaced		
2021	Crete	Melina-Maria Miliou	Μελίνα και Μαρία Μηλιού	Unplaced		

=== Mister Supranational Greece ===
- : Declared as Winner
- : Ended as runner-up
- : Ended as one of the finalists or semifinalists
- : Ended as special awards winner

Mister GS Hellas owned the license of Mister Supranational in 2021. Then main winner of Mister GS Hellas represents Greece at Mister Supranational male pageant.

Year	Region	Mister Greece	Greek Name	Placement at Miss Supranational	Special awards	Notes
George Kouvaris directorship — a franchise holder to Mister Supranational from 2021
Did not compete in 2024–present
2023	Attica	Mihalis Kolikas	Μιχάλης Κολίκας	Unplaced		
2022	Attica	Leonidas Amfilochios	Λεωνίδας Αμφιλόχιος	2nd Runner-up		
2021	Central Macedonia	Spyros Nikolaidis	Σπύρος Νικολαΐδης	Top 20		
