= Laura Gonçalves =

Venezuelan model (born 1989)

- Born: Laura Adriana Gonçalves da Câmara; February 4, 1989 (age 37); Baruta, Miranda, Venezuela
- Education: New University of Lisbon
- Height: 1.75 m (5 ft 9 in)
- Beauty pageant titleholder
- Title: Miss Portugal 2011
- Hair color: Light brown
- Eye color: Green
- Major competition: Miss Portugal 2011 (Winner) Miss Universe 2011 (Top 10) (Fan Vote Winner)

Laura Gonçalves (born February 4, 1989) is a Portuguese-Venezuelan model and beauty pageant titleholder. She was crowned Miss Universo Portugal 2011, on July 29 at the Hotel Miragem in Cascais. She represented Portugal at the Miss Universe 2011 pageant and made in the Top 10, making it the highest placement for Portugal.

Laura was born in Baruta to Portuguese parents who were born and raised in Caracas. She graduated from Academia Merici, a prestigious Ursuline school in 2007. She returned to Portugal with her parents to start college and pursue a modeling career. She speaks fluent Portuguese, Spanish and English.

Laura attended the New University of Lisbon and lives in Porto.

Awards and achievements
Preceded by Iva Lamarão	Miss República Portuguesa; 2013	Succeeded by Patrícia Da Silva
Preceded by First	Fan Vote Winner - Miss Universe; 2011	Succeeded by (Philippines) Ariella Arida
