= Keylin Suzette Gómez =

Honduran beauty pageant titleholder (born 1989)

- Height: 1.65 m (5 ft 5 in)
- Beauty pageant titleholder
- Title: Miss Universo Honduras 2011
- Hair color: Brown
- Major competitions: Miss Universo Honduras 2011 (Winner); Miss Universe 2011

Keylin Suzette Gómez (born 1989) is a Honduran model and beauty pageant titleholder who was crowned Miss Honduras 2011 and represented her country in the 2011 Miss Universe pageant.

== Miss Universo Honduras 2011 ==
Gómez, who stands 1.65 m (5 ft 5 in), competed as one of the finalists in her country's national beauty pageant Miss Universo Honduras 2011, held on July 27, 2011, at Centro Social Hondureño Arabe in San Pedro Sula, gaining the right to represent her country in Miss Universe 2011.

== Miss Universe 2011 ==
As the official representative of Honduras to the 2011 Miss Universe pageant, broadcast live from São Paulo, Brazil on September 12, 2011, Gómez vied to succeed current Miss Universe titleholder, Ximena Navarrete of Mexico.

Awards and achievements
| Preceded by Kenia Martinez | Miss Universo Honduras; 2011 | Succeeded by Jennifer Andrade |
| Preceded by Karen Sabillón | Miss Continente Americano Honduras; 2011 | Succeeded by Andrea Morales |
