= Chelsy Davy =

Zimbabwean businesswoman (born 1985)

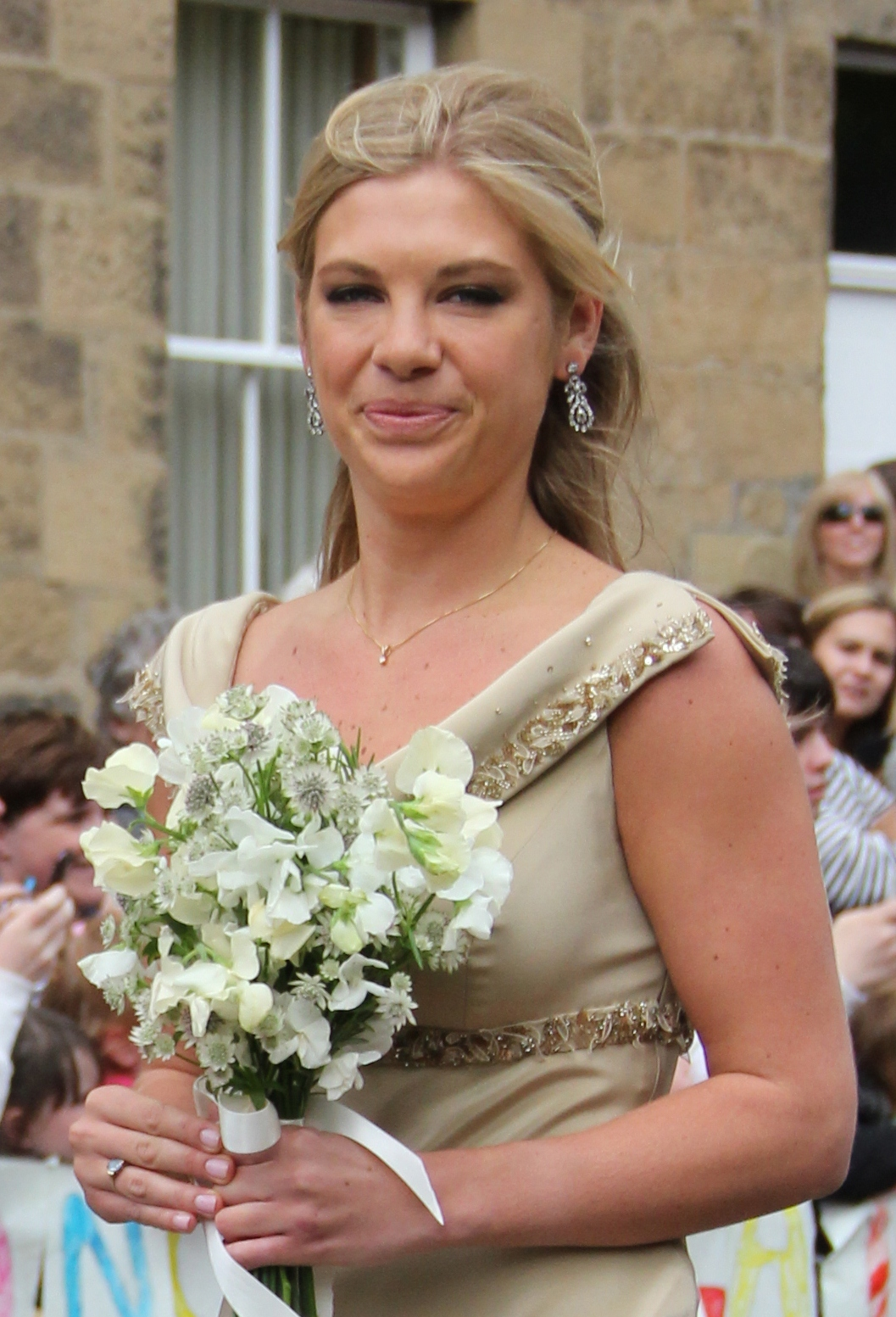
- Davy in 2013
- Born: Chelsy Yvonne Davy; 13 October 1985 (age 41); Bulawayo, Zimbabwe
- Education: University of Cape Town; University of Leeds; Gemological Institute of America
- Occupation: Businesswoman
- Spouse: Sam Cutmore-Scott (m. 2022)
- Children: 3

Chelsy Yvonne Davy (born 13 October 1985) is a Zimbabwean businesswoman. She is the owner and founder of the jewellery brand Aya and the travel agency Aya Africa. From 2004 until 2009, she was in a relationship with Prince Harry.

== Early life and education ==
Davy was born in Bulawayo, Zimbabwe, to Charles Davy, a South African safari farmer, and Beverley Donald Davy, a former Coca-Cola model and winner of the 1973 Miss Rhodesia contest. She has a younger brother, Shaun, and grew up at her family's homestead in the Lemco Safari Area.

Her father, Charles, was one of the largest private landowners in Zimbabwe, and was reported to own 800,000 acres (320,000 ha) of land. He maintained business ties with controversial politician Webster Shamu, of whom he said, "I am in partnership with a person who I personally like and get along with. I am not involved in politics in any way." After being criticised by the press, however, Davy sold his share in the business.

=== Education ===
Davy was briefly educated at Cheltenham College. Before that, she attended Girls' College in Bulawayo, Zimbabwe (not Cheltenham Ladies' College as has been widely reported), before moving to Stowe School in Buckinghamshire. She received a bachelor's degree in economics from the University of Cape Town in 2006, and a law degree (LLB) from University of Leeds in 2009.

== Career ==
Davy worked as a solicitor at the London law firm Allen & Overy from September 2011 to late 2014, when she decided to quit.

=== Jewellery ===
After studying at the Gemological Institute of America, Davy launched a jewellery brand, Aya, in July 2016.

=== Travel organising ===
In 2020, in an interview with Tatler Magazine, Davy announced that Aya would be branching out into the luxury travel sector to organise African holidays. She then announced the launch of Aya Africa on Instagram.

== Personal life ==
Davy is married to hotelier Sam Cutmore-Scott, the brother of actor Jack Cutmore-Scott. They have a son, Leo, born in 2022, a daughter, Chloe, born in 2024. and a son, Finn, born in 2026.

=== Relationship with Prince Harry ===
Davy met Prince Harry, a member of the British royal family, in early 2004, when she was a student at Stowe School. They were in a romantic relationship until 2009, when she announced in a post on Facebook that it had ended.

In 2011, when rumours of a possible reconciliation surfaced, both Davy and Prince Harry publicly debunked them. Prince Harry professed himself "100 percent single", and Davy, who had attended the wedding of Prince William and Catherine Middleton on 29 April 2011, confirmed that she would not marry Prince Harry, citing the incompatibility of their life choices.

In May 2018, Davy was a guest at the wedding of Prince Harry and American actress Meghan Markle.

==== Privacy and the media ====
In November 2021, private investigator Gavin Burrows claimed in a BBC documentary that Davy's communications had been targeted, and her voicemails hacked, in an attempt by media outlets to gather information on Prince Harry; he also apologized for the part he said he had played in those efforts. Burrow's claims "are yet to be tested in court and are strongly disputed" by The Sun and the now-defunct News of the World. In a witness statement that was part of a civil action Prince Harry had brought against Associated Newspapers Ltd, the publisher of the Daily Mail, he alleged that the news company had obtained information about his and Davy's whereabouts through "unlawful means", and that this had left her feeling "hunted" and "shaken". In a witness statement he gave as part of an action he had brought against Mirror Group Newspapers for alleged unlawful activity by its journalists, he claimed that Davy had decided that "a royal life was not for her".

Burrows later withdrew the witness statement that had been prepared for Harry's legal team in litigation against Associated Newspapers Ltd. He subsequently said he had not personally obtained Davy's flight details or carried out the specific activities attributed to him, and alleged that his comments in the BBC documentary had been edited to give that impression. He also claimed that the witness statement did not reflect his evidence, alleging it contained assertions he had not made and accusing Harry's legal team of fabricating parts of the document and forging his signature.
