= Marina Machete =

Portuguese model (born 1995)

- Marina Machete, Miss Portugal 2023
- Born: 1 October 1995 (age 31); Palmela, Portugal
- Occupation: Model
- Height: 1.75 m (5 ft 9 in)
- Beauty pageant titleholder
- Title: Miss Portugal 2023
- Hair colour: brown
- Eye colour: Hazel
- Major competition: Miss Portugal 2023 (Winner) Miss Universe 2023 (Top 20)

Marina Machete Reis (Portuguese pronunciation: [mɐˈɾinɐ mɐˈʃetɨ]; born 1 October 1995) is a Portuguese model and beauty pageant titleholder who was crowned Miss Universe Portugal 2023. She is the first Portuguese openly transgender woman to participate in the Miss Universe contest. She represented Portugal at the Miss Universe 2023 pageant in El Salvador and finished as a Top 20 semifinalist, becoming the first openly trans woman to place. She is the third openly trans woman to compete in Miss Universe in 2023 after Rikkie Kollé of Netherlands and Angela Ponce of Spain. She also won the "Most Confident" award at the competition.

== Personal life ==
Marina Machete Reis was born on October 1, 1995, in Palmela, Portugal, a town in the Lisbon Region and Setúbal District, approximately 25 kilometers south of Lisbon. As a child, she developed an interest in fashion, beauty, and self-expression, which would later inspire her modeling career. She was assigned male at birth before undergoing gender reassignment.

== Career ==
=== Modeling ===
Machete has experience modeling for various fashion brands and has appeared in editorial spreads, showcasing her versatility and ability to adapt to different styles and themes. Her modeling career has been a remarkable journey, marked by numerous achievements and milestones. She began her modeling career in 2018, shortly after being crowned Miss Universe Portugal. Her first modeling gig was with a local fashion brand in Portugal, where she appeared in a campaign showcasing the brand's summer collection.

Since then, Machete has worked with various fashion brands, appearing in editorials, campaigns, and runway shows. Her versatility and ability to adapt to different styles and themes have made her a sought-after model in the industry. She has modeled for both high-end and commercial brands, showcasing her range and ability to work with diverse clients. Some of her notable modeling achievements include appearing on the cover of Portuguese Vogue, walking the runway for top designers during Lisbon Fashion Week, featuring in campaigns for international brands such as L'Oréal and Maybelline, as well as gracing the pages of top fashion magazines such as Elle and Harper's Bazaar. Machete's modeling career has taken her to various destinations around the world, including New York, Paris, Milan, and Tokyo. She has experienced different cultures and worked with diverse teams, expanding her knowledge and skills in the process.

=== Flight attendant ===
Prior to modeling, Machete worked as a flight attendant in 2018.

=== Public speaking ===
As the beauty pageant titleholder and advocate for LGBTQ+ rights, Machete has developed public speaking skills, able to articulate her thoughts and opinions. Thus, she is reported to be fluent in Portuguese, Spanish and English.

=== Other ventures ===
==== Community outreach ====
Machete's advocacy work for LGBTQ+ rights and inclusivity has given her experience in community outreach and engagement, able to connect with diverse groups and build relationships with stakeholders.

==== Media appearances ====
Machete has experience appearing on TV, radio, and online media, comfortable with interviews, debates, and discussions on various topics.

==== Social media management ====
With a strong online presence, Machete has experience managing social media accounts, creating content, and engaging with followers. Days before winning the Miss Portugal title, the model took to social media to say she was proud to be the first trans woman to compete for the title. The post had more than 500 comments.

Her national victory took over the internet with praise and controversies alike. Despite facing criticism and backlash from some members of the Portuguese media and public, Machete remains steadfast in her commitment to inclusivity and diversity, using her platform to promote positive change and challenge outdated beauty standards.

== Pageantry ==
Machete's pageantry journey began when she was crowned Miss Universe Portugal 2023, representing her country at the Miss Universe 2023 pageant in El Salvador. She became the first openly trans woman to compete for the title of Miss Universe Portugal. Her participation in the international pageant was met with both praise and criticism, sparking debate about inclusivity and diversity in the beauty industry. At the Miss Universe 2023 pageant, Machete finished as a top 20 semifinalist.

=== Miss Universe Portugal 2023 ===
At 28 years old, Machete, a flight attendant, placed ahead of 16 other contestants. She competed at the Miss Universe 2023 in El Salvador. She has used her platform to advocate for trans rights, emphasizing the need to combat "transphobia and intolerance" around the world.

As a result of being an openly transgender woman, she experienced criticism on Portuguese media after being crowned as Miss Universe Portugal. After winning the contest, Machete posted to her Instagram account “to all of you watching, I just want to say that, just like the universe, your possibilities in life are limitless...so don’t limit yourself to any dream that you have.” She is an advocate for LGBTQ+ rights and inclusivity and has spoken publicly about her experiences as a trans woman.

=== Miss Portugal 2023 ===
On Thursday 2023, Machete was awarded the Miss Portugal title in Borba, in the southeastern Evora region, Portugal.

=== Miss Universe 2023 ===
She, along with Rikkie Kollé of the Netherlands, were the second and third openly trans women to compete at Miss Universe after Ángela Ponce of Spain in 2018. At the Miss Universe 2023, she placed among the Top 20 semifinalists, making history as the first openly trans woman to place at Miss Universe in the pageant's history.

== Accolades ==
Machete was crowned Miss Universe Portugal 2023. She also won the Most Confident Award at the Miss Universe 2023 competition, a recognition of her poise, grace, and self-assurance on the stage. As the first openly trans woman to compete for the title of Miss Universe Portugal, Machete has broken down barriers and inspired the LGBTQ+ community to pursue their dreams in the beauty industry. She continues to be a role model for young people around the world who are seeking to express themselves authentically.

=== Miss Universe Portugal 2023 ===
Year	Nominee / work	Award	Result
2023	Herself	For her hard work, beauty, dedication, and passion for pageantry	Won

=== Miss Portugal 2023 ===
Year	Nominee / work	Award	Result
2023	Herself	For her hard work, beauty, dedication, and passion for pageantry	Won

=== Most Confident Award 2023 ===
Year	Nominee / work	Award	Result
2023	Herself	For grace, and self-assurance	Won

== Allegations ==
After being crowned Miss Universe Portugal, Machete faced severe criticism and backlashes from some members of the Portuguese media and public. Some critics argued that she did not meet the traditional beauty standards of the pageant, while others questioned her eligibility to compete as a trans woman. Despite these challenges, Machete remained steadfast in her commitment to inclusivity and diversity, using her platform to promote positive change and challenge outdated beauty standards. Her response to the criticism has been widely praised, and she has emerged as a role model for young people around the world who are seeking to express themselves authentically.

Awards and achievements
Preceded by Telma Madeira	Miss Portugal; 2023	Succeeded by Andreia Correia
