= Miss Universe 2023 =

72nd edition of the Miss Universe competition

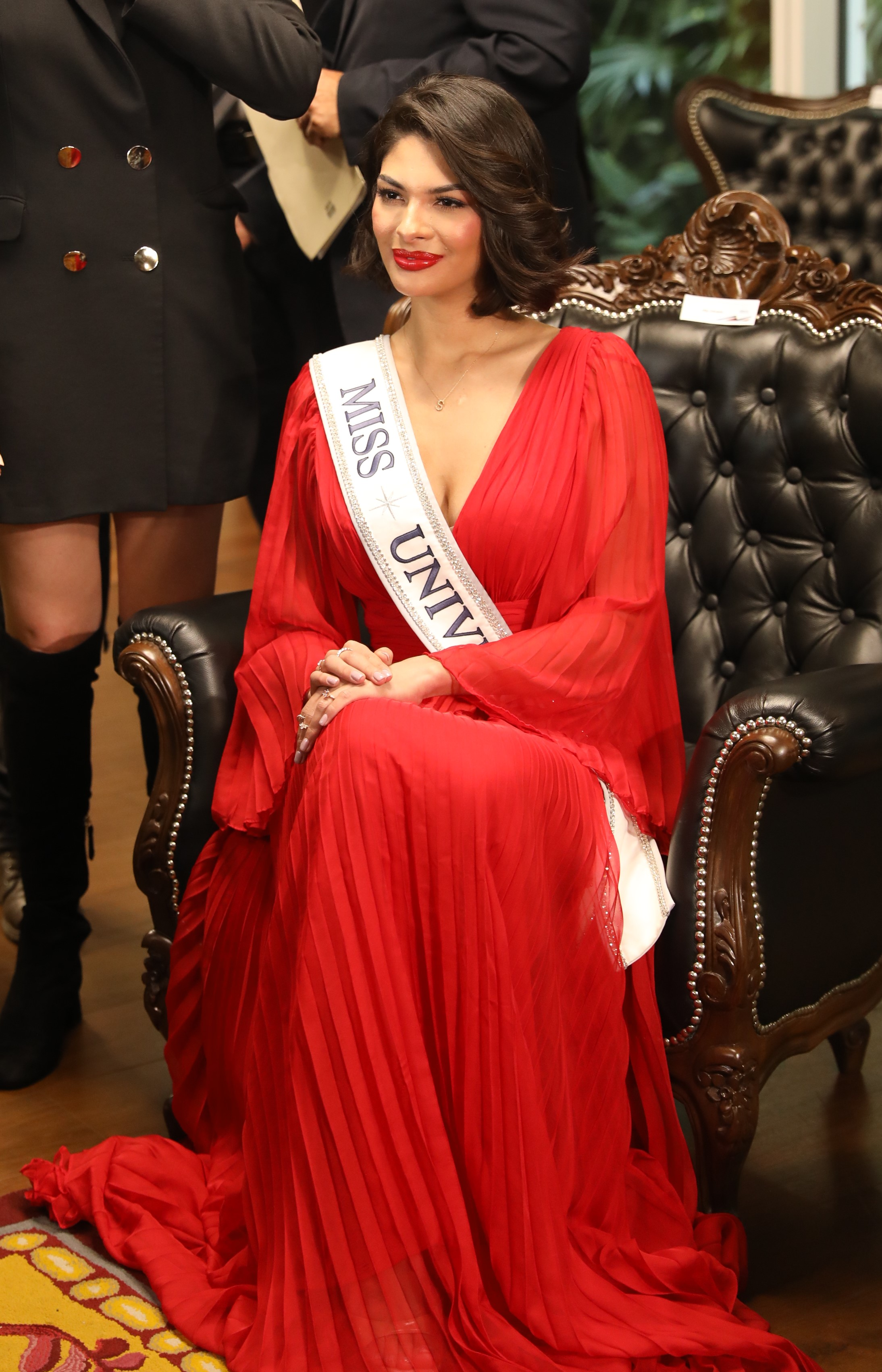
- Sheynnis Palacios
- Date: 18 November 2023
- Presenters: Jeannie Mai; Maria Menounos; Olivia Culpo; Catriona Gray; Zuri Hall
- Entertainment: John Legend
- Theme: Hello, Universe!
- Venue: Gimnasio Nacional José Adolfo Pineda, San Salvador, El Salvador
- Broadcaster: International: Roku; Telemundo; Official broadcaster: Canal 2
- Entrants: 84
- Placements: 20
- Debuts: Pakistan
- Withdrawals: Armenia; Belize; Bhutan; China; Ghana; Haiti; Kyrgyzstan; Seychelles; Turkey; Uruguay
- Returns: Denmark; Egypt; Guyana; Hungary; Ireland; Kazakhstan; Latvia; Mongolia; Norway; Zimbabwe
- Winner: Sheynnis Palacios; Nicaragua
- Congeniality: Athenea Pérez, Spain
- Best National Costume: Michelle Dee, Philippines

Miss Universe 2023 was the 72nd Miss Universe pageant, held at the Gimnasio Nacional José Adolfo Pineda in San Salvador, El Salvador, on 18 November 2023.

Sheynnis Palacios of Nicaragua won the competition, succeeding R'Bonney Gabriel of the United States and becoming the first Nicaraguan to win in the contest and any of the Big Four international beauty pageants. Her runners-up, in descending order, were Anntonia Porsild from Thailand and Moraya Wilson from Australia.

Contestants from 84 countries and territories competed in this edition. The competition was presented by Jeannie Mai and Miss Universe 2012, Olivia Culpo for the second consecutive time, along with Maria Menounos. Miss Universe 2018, Catriona Gray and Zuri Hall also served as backstage correspondents for the second time. John Legend performed in this edition.

== Location and date ==
On 14 January 2023, during the Miss Universe 2022 pageant, Salvadoran president Nayib Bukele announced that the 72nd edition will be held in El Salvador in late 2023, after having last hosted the pageant in 1975. Later, on 27 July 2023, the Miss Universe Organization announced that the pageant will take place on 18 November 2023.

The choice of El Salvador as the host country was met with criticism due to the country's ongoing state of emergency amid the Salvadoran gang crackdown. Protests were staged in the capital San Salvador following the allocation of public funds for the hosting of the pageant amid an economic crisis.

To promote the pageant, the organization offered a "Hello Universe" travel package.

== Selection of participants ==
Contestants from eighty-four countries and territories were selected to compete in the pageant. Among the delegates, three were appointed to compete as the runner-up in their national pageant, (Note: Tomiris Zair of Kazakhstan was the first runner-up in Miss Kazakhstan 2022. Maya Aboul Hosn of Lebanon was the first runner-up in Miss Lebanon 2022. Bryoni Govender of South Africa was the first runner-up in Miss South Africa 2023.) and three were selected to replace an original winner.

For the first time since 1957, the Miss Universe Organization allowed the participation of married women and women with children to compete in the pageant. This edition's roster of contestants was noted by media outlets for its diversity and inclusivity compared to past pageants. Among the contestants in the edition were Rikkie Kollé of the Netherlands and Marina Machete of Portugal, who became the joint second transgender women to compete in the pageant, after Ángela Ponce of Spain in 2018. Furthermore, the edition also saw the participation of the first married women and mothers to compete in the pageant since 1957, with the participation of Camila Avella of Colombia, Michelle Cohn of Guatemala, and Lorena Santen of Switzerland. Jane Garrett of Nepal was also recognized by media outlets to be the "first plus-sized" delegate to compete in the pageant. Erica Robin, the first delegate to be sent by Pakistan to the pageant, was also cited as another contestant who was "making the pageant more inclusive", though her participation was met with mixed reactions within her country.

=== Replacements ===
Nominzul Zandangiin of Mongolia was replaced by her second runner-up, Namuunzul Batmagnai for undisclosed reasons. Nilmani Hurlall of Mauritius was replaced by her second runner-up, Tatiana Beauharnais. Thảo Nhi Lê of Vietnam was initially set to participate, but she was replaced by Quỳnh Hoa Bùi following a change in the license holder.

=== Debuts, returns and withdrawals ===
This edition marked the debut of Pakistan; and the returns of Zimbabwe, which last competed in 2001; Latvia in 2006; Guyana in 2017; Egypt and Mongolia in 2019; and Denmark, Hungary, Ireland, Kazakhstan and Norway last competed in 2021.

Armenia, Belize, Bhutan, Ghana, Haiti, Seychelles, Turkey, and Uruguay withdrew after their respective organizations failed to appoint a delegate, hold a national competition, or lost their national franchise. Maya Turdalieva was appointed to represent Kyrgyzstan after Diami Almazbekova, the original representative of Kyrgyzstan, decided to withdraw from the competition due to lack of preparation. Turdalieva was then replaced by Akylai Kalberdieva due to undisclosed reasons. However, Kalberdieva also decided to withdraw due to undisclosed reasons, leading to Kyrgyzstan's withdrawal from the competition. Miss Universe China 2023, Qi Jia withdrew due to logistical problems and competed at Miss Universe 2024, making the Top 30. Nadeen Ayoub of Palestine was initially expected to compete, but she withdrew from the pageant, citing the ongoing conflict in Gaza as her reason.

== Results ==
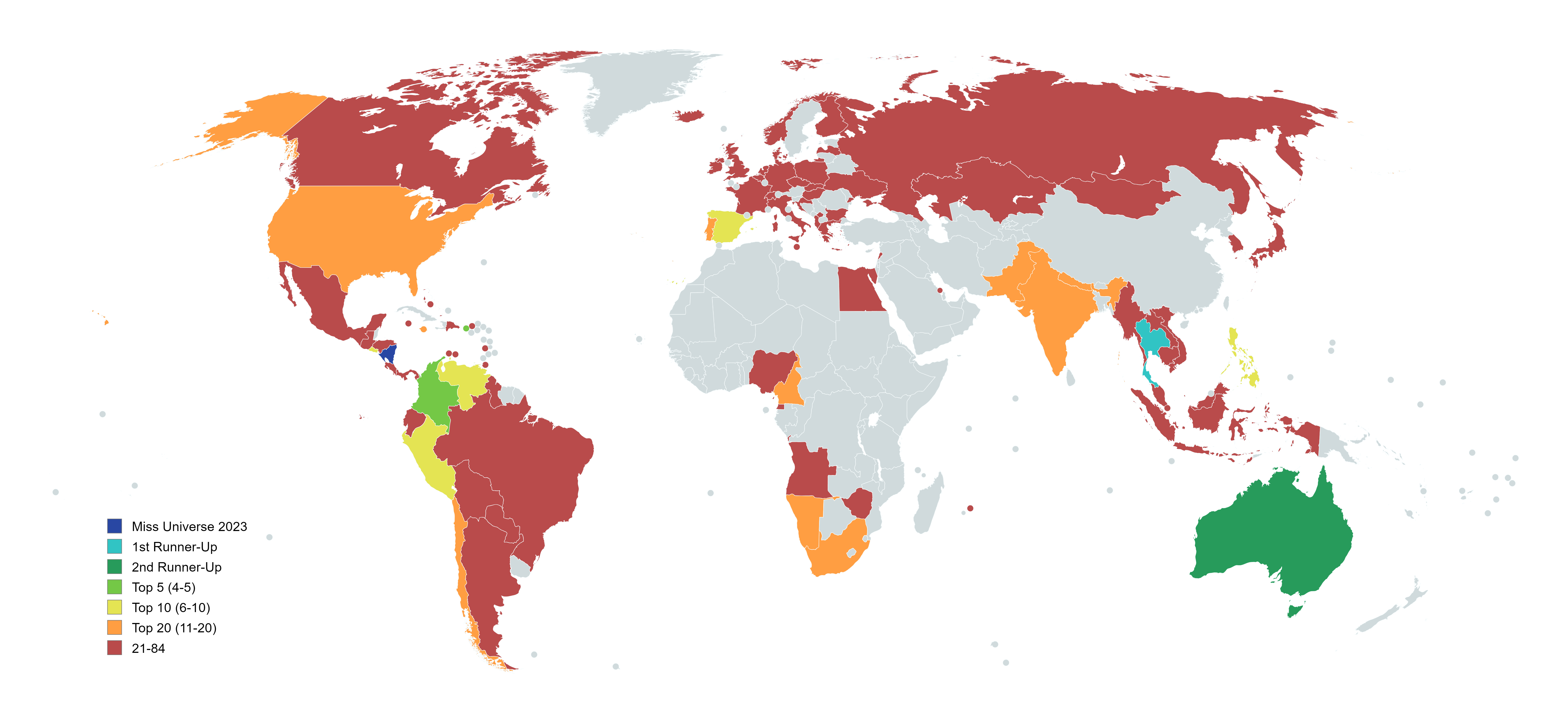
Miss Universe 2023 official results

=== Placements ===
Placement	Contestant
Miss Universe 2023	Nicaragua – Sheynnis Palacios
1st Runner-Up	Thailand – Anntonia Porsild
2nd Runner-Up	Australia – Moraya Wilson
Top 5	Colombia – Camila Avella; Puerto Rico – Karla Guilfú
Top 10	El Salvador – Isabella García-Manzo; Peru – Camila Escribens; Philippines – Michelle Dee §; Spain – Athenea Pérez; Venezuela – Diana Silva
Top 20	Cameroon – Princesse Issié; Chile – Celeste Viel; India – Shweta Sharda; Jamaica – Jordanne Levy; Namibia – Jameela Uiras; Nepal – Jane Garrett; Pakistan – Erica Robin; Portugal – Marina Machete; South Africa – Bryoni Govender; United States – Noelia Voigt

§ – Voted into the Top 20 by viewers

=== Special awards ===
Award	Contestant
Best National Costume	Philippines – Michelle Dee
Fan Vote Winner	Philippines – Michelle Dee
Miss Congeniality	Spain – Athenea Pérez

==== Spirit of Carnival Award ====
Award	Contestant
Spirit of Carnival Award by Carnival Cruise Line	Philippines – Michelle Dee

==== Voice For Change ====
In the run-up to the main pageant, the contestants competed in the Voice For Change competition, where they shared their advocacies in the course of a three-minute video. A sponsored segment with jewelry brand Mouawad and communication platform CI Talks, the winners of the competition was determined through an online vote and by a selection committee. The ten silver finalists were announced during the preliminary competition, while the three gold winners were announced during the finals.

Placement	Contestant
Gold Winners	Angola – Ana Coimbra; Philippines – Michelle Dee; Puerto Rico – Karla Guilfú
Silver Finalists	Brazil – Maria Brechane; Chile – Celeste Viel; Lebanon – Maya Aboul Hosn; Singapore – Priyanka Annuncia; South Africa – Bryoni Govender; Ukraine – Angelina Usanova; Zimbabwe – Brooke Bruk-Jackson

== Pageant ==
=== Format ===
The Miss Universe Organization announced several different changes to the format for this edition. The number of semifinalists was increased to twenty—the same number of semifinalists in 2019. The results of the preliminary competition held on 15 November 2023, which consisted of the swimsuit and evening gown competition, and the closed-door interviews, determined the first nineteen semi-finalists selected at-large. Moreover, online voting was used again in this edition, with the voting public determining the twentieth delegate to advance into the semi-finals. The twenty semi-finalists competed in the swimsuit competition and were narrowed down to ten afterward. The ten semi-finalists then competed in the evening gown competition in which five delegates were chosen to advance as finalists. The five finalists competed in the interview questions, and were narrowed down to three. The three finalists competed in the final question, after which Miss Universe 2023 and her two runners-up were announced.

=== Selection committee ===
- Halima Aden – Somali and American model
- Mario Bautista – Mexican singer (only as final telecast judge)
- Giselle Blondet – Puerto Rican actress and television host
- Janelle Commissiong – Miss Universe 1977 from Trinidad and Tobago
- Nadia Ferreira – Paraguayan model, Miss Universe Paraguay 2021 and Miss Universe 2021 first runner-up (only as final telecast judge)
- Avani Gregg – American social media personality (only as final telecast judge)
- Carson Kressley – American actor, designer and television personality (only as final telecast judge)
- Connie Mariano – Filipino and American physician
- Iris Mittenaere – Miss Universe 2016 from France
- Sweta Patel – Vice President of Growth Marketing and Merchandising at Roku (only as final telecast judge)
- Denise White – American businesswoman and Miss Oregon USA 1994

== Contestants ==
84 contestants competed for the title.

Country/Territory	Contestant	Age (Note: Ages at the time of the pageant)	Hometown
Albania	Endi Demneri	25	Tirana
Angola	Ana Coimbra	23	Benguela
Argentina	Yamile Dajud	27	Buenos Aires
Aruba	Karol Croes	27	Oranjestad
Australia	Moraya Wilson	22	Melbourne
Bahamas	Melissa Ingraham	26	Long Island
Bahrain	Lujane Yacoub	19	Hamala
Belgium	Emilie Vansteenkiste	22	Elewijt
Bolivia	Estefany Rivero	26	Trinidad
Brazil	Maria Brechane	19	Rio Grande
British Virgin Islands	Ashellica Fahie	28	Tortola
Bulgaria	Yuliia Pavlikova	30	Kerch
Cambodia	Sotima John	23	Kampong Cham
Cameroon	Issié Princesse	22	Douala
Canada	Madison Kvaltin	25	Greater Sudbury
Cayman Islands	Ileann Powery	26	West Bay
Chile	Celeste Viel	24	Santiago
Colombia	Camila Avella	28	Yopal
Costa Rica	Lisbeth Valverde	28	Uvita
Croatia	Andrea Erjavec	23	Perušić
Curaçao	Kim Rossen	26	Willemstad
Czech Republic	Vanesa Švédová	20	Přerov
Denmark	Nikoline Hansen	21	Valby
Dominican Republic	Mariana Downing	27	Cotuí
Ecuador	Delary Stoffers	23	Guayaquil
Egypt	Mohra Tantawy	22	Cairo
El Salvador	Isabella García-Manzo	20	San Salvador
Equatorial Guinea	Diana Hinestrosa	25	Corisco
Finland	Paula Joukanen	22	Helsinki
France	Diane Leyre	26	Paris
Germany	Helena Bleicher	24	Ravensburg
Great Britain	Jessica Page	28	Liverpool
Greece	Marielia Zaloumi	20	Athens
Guatemala	Michelle Cohn	28	Guatemala City
Guyana	Lisa Narine	26	Pomeroon-Supenaam
Honduras	Zuheilyn Clemente	23	Tegucigalpa
Hungary	Tünde Blága	27	Hidegség
Iceland	Lilja Pétursdóttir	19	Reykjavík
India	Shweta Sharda	23	Chandigarh
Indonesia	Fabiënne Groeneveld	23	Jakarta
Ireland	Aishah Akorede	24	Leixlip
Italy	Carmen Panepinto	24	Vittoria
Jamaica	Jordanne Levy	27	Kingston
Japan	Rio Miyazaki	20	Shizuoka
Kazakhstan	Tomiris Zair	20	Almaty
Kosovo	Arbesa Rrahmani	22	Ferizaj
Laos	Phaimany Lathsabanthao	28	Vientiane
Latvia	Kate Alexeeva	29	Riga
Lebanon	Maya Aboul Hosn	25	Btekhnay
Malaysia	Serena Lee	26	Kuala Lumpur
Malta	Ella Portelli	25	St. Julian's
Mauritius	Tatiana Beauharnais	24	Souillac
Mexico	Melissa Flores	25	Venustiano Carranza
Mongolia	Namuunzul Batmagnai	24	Ulaanbaatar
Myanmar	Amara Bo	23	Mandalay
Namibia	Jameela Uiras	23	Windhoek
Nepal	Jane Garrett	23	Kathmandu
Netherlands	Rikkie Kollé	22	Breda
Nicaragua	Sheynnis Palacios	23	Diriamba
Nigeria	Mitchel Ihezue	27	Ideato North
Norway	Julie Tollefsen	28	Oslo
Pakistan	Erica Robin	25	Karachi
Panama	Natasha Vargas	26	Las Tablas
Paraguay	Elicena Andrada	28	Tobatí
Peru	Camila Escribens	25	Lima
Philippines	Michelle Dee	28	Makati
Poland	Angelika Jurkowianiec	27	Namysłów
Portugal	Marina Machete	28	Palmela
Puerto Rico	Karla Guilfú	25	Patillas
Russia	Margarita Golubeva	22	Saint Petersburg
Saint Lucia	Earlyca Frederick	25	Choiseul
Singapore	Priyanka Annuncia	26	Singapore
Slovakia	Kinga Puhová	23	Dunajská Streda
South Africa	Bryoni Govender	27	Kempton Park
South Korea	So-yun Kim	28	South Gyeongsang
Spain	Athenea Pérez	27	Murcia
Switzerland	Lorena Santen	26	Zurich
Thailand	Anntonia Porsild	27	Nakhon Ratchasima
Trinidad and Tobago	Faith Gillezeau	25	San Fernando
Ukraine	Angelina Usanova	26	Kyiv
United States	Noelia Voigt	24	Park City
Venezuela	Diana Silva	26	Caracas
Vietnam	Quỳnh Hoa Bùi	25	Hanoi
Zimbabwe	Brooke Bruk-Jackson	21	Harare
