= Miss Honduras =

Beauty pageant

Miss Honduras Organization
- Formation: 1930; 96 years ago
- Type: Beauty pageant
- Headquarters: Tegucigalpa
- Location: Honduras
- Members: Miss Universe
- Official language: Spanish
- President: Carlos Rivera And Bryan Espinoza, Ricardo Caballero
- Website: Official site

The Miss Honduras or Miss Honduras Universe (also, known as Señorita Honduras) is a national beauty pageant in Honduras. The pageant was founded in 1930, where the winners were sent to Miss Universe.

== Titleholders ==
The following women have represented Honduras in the Big Four international beauty pageants.

Year	Miss Honduras	Department	Notes
1930	Angélica Meza Milla	Francisco Morazán	
1954	Lilliam Padilla	Francisco Morazán	
1955	Pastora Pagán Valenzuela	Cortés	
1959	Rosemary Lefebre	Francisco Morazán	
1964	Aracely Cano	Francisco Morazán	
1965	Eda Inés Munguía	Francisco Morazán	
1966	Danira Miralda	Yoro	
1967	Denia Maria Alvarado Medina	Cortés	
1968	Nora Idalia Guillén	Francisco Morazán	
1969	Viena Paredes Zelaya	Choluteca	
1970	Francis Irene VanTuyl	Cortés	
1971	Dunia Aracely Ortega	Santa Bárbara	
1972	Doris Alicia Roca Pagán	Cortés	
1973	Nelly Suyapa González Mármol	El Paraíso	
1974	Ethelinda Mejía Velásquez	Yoro	
1976	Victoria Alejandra Pineda Fortín	Cortés	
1977	Carolina Rosa Rauscher Sierra	Comayagua	
1978	Olimpia Velásquez Medina	Cortés	
1979	Gina Maria Weidner Cleaves	Cortés	
1980	Ethelvina Raudales	Yoro	
1981	Leslie Nohemi Sabillón Dávila	Francisco Morazán	
1982	Eva Lissete Barahona Dheming	Atlántida	
1983	Ollie June Thompson	Islas de la Bahía	Reina Internacional del Café 1984
1984	Mertyce Elitha Hyde	Bay Islands	
1985	Diana Margarita García	Cortés	
1986	Sandra Natalie Navarrete	Cortés	
1987	Francia Tatiana Reyes	Francisco Morazán	
1988	Jacqueline Herrera Mejía	Cortés	
1989	Frances Siryi Milla	Atlántida	
1990	Vivian Audely Moreno	Cortés	
1992	Mónica Raquel Rápalo	Atlántida	
1993	Denia Reyes	Atlántida	
1994	Jim Haylock	Bay Islands	
1996	Yazmín Fiallos	Francisco Morazán	
1997	Joselina García Cobos	Atlántida	
1998	Dania Patricia Prince Méndez	Choluteca	Miss Earth 2003
1999	Daryela Sofia Guerrero	Atlántida	
2000	Flor de María García Ferrera	Cortés	
2001	Esther Edén	Bay Islands	Resigned
2002	Erika Lizeth Ramírez	Atlántida	
2007	Wendy Patricia Salgado Corea	Francisco Morazán	
2008	Diana Gabriela Barraza Miralda	Olancho	
2009	Belgica Nataly Suárez González	Francisco Morazán	
2010	Kenia Melissa Martínez	Atlántida	
2011	Keylin Suzette Gómez Flores	Cortés	
2012	Jennifer Denise Andrade Felicidades	Francisco Morazán	
2013	Diana Gertrude Shoutsen Mendoza	Atlántida	
2014	Gabriela Nikol Ordóñez Cortés	Comayagua	
2015	Iroshka Lindaly Elvir Flores	Francisco Morazán	
2016	Olga Sirey Morán Castro	Yoro	Nuestra Belleza Latina 2021
2017	April Claudette Tobie Ramos	Bay Islands	
2018	Claudia Vanessa Villars Figueroa	Santa Bárbara	
2019	Rosemary Natalí Arauz Mejía	Cortés	
2020	Cecilia Maria Rossell Guerra	Copán	
2021	Rose Meléndez	Colón	
2022	Rebeca Rodríguez Mora	San Pedro Sula	
2023	Zuheilyn Clemente	Tegucigalpa	
2024	Stephanie Cam	San Pedro Sula	
2025	Alejandra Fuentes	Olancho	
2026	Luisa Pineda	Cortés	

== Titleholders under Miss Honduras org. ==
=== Miss Honduras Universo ===
- : Declared as Winner
- : Ended as runner-up or top 5/6 qualification
- : Ended as one of the finalists or semifinalists
- : Ended as special awards winner

The Winner of Miss Honduras represents the country at the Miss Universe pageant. If the winner will resign the title, the runner-up will take over the crown.

Year	Department	Miss Honduras	Placement at Miss Universe	Special Awards	Notes
2026	Cortés	Luisa Pineda	TBA		
2025	Olancho	Alejandra Fuentes	Unplaced		
2024	San Pedro Sula	Stephanie Cam	Unplaced	Best Skin	
2023	Tegucigalpa	Zuheilyn Clemente	Unplaced		
2022	San Pedro Sula	Rebeca Rodríguez Mora	Unplaced		
2021	Colón	Rose Meléndez	Unplaced		
2020	Copán	Cecilia María Rossell Guerra	Unplaced		Appointed — Due to the impact of COVID-19 pandemic, the Third Runner-up of 2019 crowned as the Miss Honduras 2020.
2019	Cortés	Rosemary Natalí Arauz Mejía	Unplaced		
2018	Santa Bárbara	Claudia Vanessa Villars Figueroa	Unplaced		
2017	Bay Islands	April Claudette Tobie Ramos	Unplaced		Ricardo Caballero (ICA/Independencia Centro America) directorship, Later Miss International Honduras 2024.
2016	Yoro	Olga Sirey Morán Castro	Unplaced		Dethroned later retained title; Crowned in 2015 together with Miss Honduras 2015, Iroshka Lindaly Elvir Flores.
2015	Francisco Morazán	Iroshka Lindaly Elvir Flores	Unplaced		
2014	Comayagua	Gabriela Nikol Ordóñez Cortés	Unplaced		
2013	Atlántida	Diana Shoutsen Mendoza	Unplaced		
2012	Francisco Morazán	Jennifer Denise Andrade	Unplaced		
2011	Cortés	Keylin Suzette Gómez Flores	Unplaced		
2010	Colón	Kenia Melissa Martínez	Unplaced		
2009	Francisco Morazán	Belgica Nataly Suárez	Unplaced		
2008	Francisco Morazán	Diana Gabriela Barraza Miralda	Unplaced		
2007	Francisco Morazán	Wendy Patricia Salgado Corea	Unplaced		Carlos Rivera directorship.
Señorita Honduras
Did not compete between 2003—2006
2002	Colón	Erika Lizeth Ramírez	Unplaced	Best National Costume (Top 20)	
2001	Yoro	Olenka Miroslava Fuschich	Unplaced	Best National Costume (Top 3)	Appointed — A Runner-up took over to compete at Miss Universe 2001.
2001	Bay Islands	Esther Edén	Did not compete		Resigned.
2000	Cortés	Flor de María García Ferrera	Unplaced		
1999	Atlántida	Daryela Sofia Guerrero	Unplaced		
1998	Choluteca	Dania Patricia Prince Méndez	Unplaced		
1997	Atlántida	Joselina García Cobos	Unplaced		
1996	El Paraiso	Yazmín Fiallos	Unplaced		
1995	Did not compete				
1994	Bay Islands	Jem Haylock	Unplaced		
1993	Atlántida	Denia Reyes	Unplaced		
1992	Atlántida	Mónica Raquel Rápalo	Unplaced		
1991	Yoro	Claudia Mercedes Caballero	Did not compete		
1990	Cortés	Vivian Audely Moreno	Unplaced		
1989	Atlántida	Frances Siryi Milla	Unplaced		
1988	Cortés	Jacqueline Herrera Mejía	Unplaced		
1987	Francisco Morazán	Francia Tatiana Reyes	Unplaced	Miss Congeniality	
1986	Cortés	Sandra Natalie Navarrete	Unplaced		
1985	Cortés	Diana Margarita García	Unplaced		
1984	Bay Islands	Mertyce Elitha Hyde	Unplaced		
1983	Bay Islands	Ollie June Thompson	Unplaced		
1982	Atlántida	Eva Lissete Barahona Dheming	Unplaced		
1981	Francisco Morazán	Leslie Nohemi Sabillón Dávila	Unplaced		
1980	Yoro	Etelvina Raudales	Unplaced		
1979	Cortés	Gina Maria Weidner Cleaves	Unplaced		
1978	Cortés	Olimpia Velásquez Medina	Unplaced		
1977	Comayagua	Carolina Rosa Rauscher Sierra	Unplaced		
1976	Cortés	Victoria Alejandra Pineda Fortín	Unplaced		
1975	Did not compete				
1974	Yoro	Ethelinda Mejía Velásquez	Unplaced		
1973	El Paraíso	Nelly Suyapa González Mármol	Unplaced		
1972	Cortés	Doris Alicia Roca Pagán	Unplaced		
1971	Santa Bárbara	Dunia Aracelly Ortega	Unplaced		
1970	Cortés	Francis Irene VanTuyl	Unplaced		
1969	Choluteca	Viena Paredes Zelaya	Unplaced		
1968	Francisco Morazán	Nora Idalia Guillén	Unplaced		
1967	Cortés	Denia Maria Alvafado Medina	Unplaced		
Miss Honduras
Did not compete between 1956—1966
1955	Cortés	Pastora Pagán Valenzuela	Top 15		
1954	Francisco Morazán	Lilliam Padilla	Unplaced		

=== Miss Honduras Mundo ===
- : Declared as Winner
- : Ended as runner-up or top 5/6 qualification
- : Ended as one of the finalists or semifinalists
- : Ended as special awards winner

Prior to 2008 a Runner-up or sometimes winner of Miss Honduras went to Miss World pageant. Began 2008 the winner of Señorita Honduras Mundo in under Eduardo Zablah represents her country at the Miss World pageant.

Year	Department	Señorita Honduras Mundo	Placement at Miss World	Special Awards	Notes
2025	Atlántida	Izza Sevilla	Unplaced		
2024	No competition held				
2023	El Paraíso	Yelsin Almendarez	Unplaced		
2022	Miss World 2021 was rescheduled to 16 March 2022 due to the COVID-19 pandemic outbreak in Puerto Rico, no edition started in 2022				
2021	Yoro	Dayana Bordas	Unplaced		
2020	Due to the impact of COVID-19 pandemic, no competition held				
2019	Yoro	Ana Romero	Unplaced	Miss World Sport (Top 32)	
2018	Comayagua	Dayana Sabillón	Unplaced		
2017	Santa Bárbara	Celia Monterrosa	Unplaced	Miss World Top Model (Top 30)	
2016	Colón	Kerelyne Campigotti Webster	Unplaced	Miss World Sport (Top 24)	
2015	Francisco Morazán	Gabriela Vanessa Salazar Valle	Unplaced		
2014	Santa Bárbara	María José Alvarado	Did not compete		Withdrew — Kidnapped and murdered before competing.
2013	Bay Islands	Mónica Alexis Elwin Gough	Unplaced		
2012	Copán	Jennifer Giselle Valle Morel	Unplaced		
2011	Cortés	Bessy Beatriz Ochoa López	Unplaced		
2010	Colón	Marilyn Elizabeth Medina	Unplaced		
2009	Copán	Blaise Allys Massey Alvarado	Unplaced		
2008	Copán	Gabriela Dennisse Zavala Irias	Unplaced		Señorita Honduras Mundo — Eduardo Zablah directorship.
Miss World Honduras
Did not compete between 2005—2007
2004	Bay Islands	Kimberly Michelle Macnab	Unplaced		Closed election.
Honduran representatives from Señorita Honduras
Did not compete between 2001—2003
2000	Cortés	Verónica Alejandra Castellón	Unplaced		
1999	Cortés	Irma Waleska Quijada Henríquez	Unplaced		
1998	Did not compete				
1997	Copán	Hansel Cristina Cáceres Teruel	Unplaced		
Did not compete between 1994—1996
1993	Francisco Morazán	Tania Bruchmann Escorcia	Unplaced		
1992	Did not compete				
1991	Francisco Morazán	Arlene Rocío Rauscher Duarte	Unplaced		
1990	Cortés	Claudia Bendaña McCausland	Unplaced		
1989	Cortés	Belinda Bodden Alvarez	Unplaced		
1988	Francisco Morazán	Alina Patricia Díaz Ordóñez	Unplaced		
1987	El Paraiso	Claudia María Paz	Unplaced		
1986	Cortés	Nilcer Maria Viscovich	Unplaced		
1985	Did not compete				
1984	Bay Islands	Mertyce Elitha Hyde	Unplaced		
1983	Cortés	Carmen Isabel Morales Ustariz	Unplaced		
1982	Cortés	Ana Lucia Rivera Castro	Unplaced		
1981	Cortés	Xiomara Sikaffy Mena	Unplaced		
1980	Yoro	Etelvina (Ethel) Raudales	Unplaced		
1979	Cortés	Gina Maria Weidner Cleaves	Unplaced		
1978	Cortés	Maria Elena Bodadilla	Unplaced		
1977	Francisco Morazán	María Marlene Villela Franco	Unplaced		
1976	Colón	Maribel Ileana Ayala Ramírez	Unplaced		
1975	Yoro	Ethelinda Mejía Velásquez	Unplaced		
1974	Bay Islands	Leslie Suez Ramírez	Unplaced		
1973	Cortés	Belinda Handal	Unplaced		
1972	—	Doris Van Tuyl	Unplaced		
Did not compete between 1968—1971
1967	—	Alba Maria Bobadilla	Unplaced		
1966	Cortés	Denia Maria Alvarado Medina	Unplaced		
1965	Francisco Morazán	Eda Inés Munguía	Unplaced		
1964	Francisco Morazán	Aracely Cano	Unplaced		
Honduran representatives from Miss Honduras
Did not compete between 1960—1963
1959	Francisco Morazán	Rosemary Lefebre	Unplaced		
Did not compete between 1956—1958
1955	Cortés	Pastora Pagán Valenzuela	Unplaced		

=== Miss Honduras Internacional ===
- : Declared as Winner
- : Ended as runner-up or top 5/6 qualification
- : Ended as one of the finalists or semifinalists
- : Ended as special awards winner

Prior to 2009 a Runner-up or sometimes winner of Miss Honduras went to Miss International pageant. Began in 2009 the Señorita Honduras Internacional winner in under Eduardo Zablah represents her country at the Miss International pageant.

Year	Department	Señorita Honduras Internacional	Placement at Miss International	Special Awards	Notes
2026	Tegucigalpa	Annette Christiansen	Did not compete		
2025	Francisco Morazán	Irma Handal	Unplaced		
2024	Bay Islands	April Claudette Tobie Ramos	Top 20	Miss Fitness	Previously Miss Universe Honduras 2017.
2023	Did not compete				
2022	Cortés	Zully Paz Pasan	Unplaced		
Due to the impact of COVID-19 pandemic, no competition held between 2020—2021
2019	Atlántida	Ariana María Bustillo Flores	Unplaced		
2018	Olancho	Mayra Alejandra Fuentes	Unplaced		
2017	Santa Bárbara	Claudia Vanessa Villars Figueroa	Top 15		
2016	El Paraíso	Andrea Nicol Salinas Godoy	Unplaced		
2015	Francisco Morazán	Jennifer Giselle Valle Morel	1st Runner-up		
2014	Cortés	Mónica Kristel Brocatto	Unplaced		
2013	Did not compete				
2012	Francisco Morazán	Shirley Velasques Morales	Unplaced	Best National Costume	
2011	Atlántida	Esthefany Pineda	Unplaced		
2010	Did not compete				
2009	Atlántida	Kenia Melissa Andrade	Unplaced	Best National Costume	Señorita Honduras Mundo — Eduardo Zablah Directorship; the Miss International Honduras placed as Señorita Honduras Internacional.
Miss International Honduras
2008	Did not compete				
2007	—	Margarita Valle	Unplaced		Closed election.
2006	Colón	Lissa Diana Viera Sáenz	Unplaced		Closed election.
2005	Santa Bárbara	Ingrid Lopez	Unplaced		Closed election.
Honduran Representatives from Señorita Honduras
Did not compete between 2001—2004
2000	Yoro	Alba Marcela Rubí Castellón	Unplaced		
1999	Did not compete				
1998	Cortés	Wendy Suyapa Rodríguez	Unplaced		
1997	Bay Islands	Jennifer Elizabeth Campbell	Unplaced		
1996	Did not compete				
1995	Francisco Morazáñ	Sayda Umaña López	Unplaced		
1994	Did not compete				
1993	Francisco Morazán	Miriam Liseth Zapata Godoy	Unplaced		
1992	Cortés	Francis Funez Padilla	Top 15		
1991	Cortés	Marly Karina Prudoth Guzmán	Unplaced		
1990	Yoro	Claudia Mercedes Caballero	Unplaced		
1989	Cortés	Cynthia Zavala	Unplaced		
1988	Francisco Morazán	Erika Aguilera Garay	Unplaced		
1987	Bay Islands	Darlene Jacqueline Sikaffy Powery	Unplaced		
1986	Francisco Morazán	Francia Tatiana Reyes Beselinoff	Unplaced		
1985	Cortés	Waleska Zavala Peñalva	Unplaced		
1984	Bay Islands	Mertyce Elitha Hyde	Unplaced		
1983	Francisco Morazán	Ileana Maritza Turcios	Unplaced		
1982	Francisco Morazán	Alba Luz Rogel	Unplaced		
1981	Cortés	Gloria Patricia Durón	4th Runner-up		
1980	Atlántida	Jennifer Bustillo	Unplaced		
1979	Atlántida	Lilian Anibeth Rivera	Unplaced		
1978	Atlántida	Lorena Irias Navas	Unplaced		
1977	Francisco Morazán	Maria Marlene Villela Franco	Unplaced		
1976	Francisco Morazán	Victoria Ann Baker	Top 15		
1975	Yoro	Ligia Caballero Cárdenas	Unplaced		
1974	Ocotepeque	Rosario Elena Carbajal	Unplaced		
1973	Yoro	Rosa Edelinda López	Unplaced		
1972	Did not compete				
1971	Cortés	Doris Van Tuyl	Unplaced		

=== Miss Honduras Tierra ===
- : Declared as Winner
- : Ended as runner-up or top 5/6 qualification
- : Ended as one of the finalists or semifinalists
- : Ended as special awards winner

The Señorita Honduras Tierra winner in under Eduardo Zablah represented her country at the Miss Earth pageant. Before creating the pageant the first runner-up of Miss Honduras or winner competed at the Miss Earth pageant between 2007 and 2012. Today the Miss Earth Honduras is holding by Miss Earth Honduras.

Year	Department	Miss Earth Honduras	Placement at Miss Earth	Special Awards	Notes
2025	Yoro	Claudia Castañeda	Unplaced		
2024	Gracias a Dios	Elizabeth Maldonado	Unplaced		
2023	Comayagua	Ariana Gomez	Unplaced		
2022	Valle	Idania Santos	Did not compete		
2021	Roatán	Jissel Rivera	Did not compete		
2020	Tela	Mary Cruz Cardona	Unplaced		
2019	Yoro	Rita Velasquez	Unplaced		
2018	Danli	Diana Palma	Unplaced		
2017	Tegucigalpa	Valeria Cardona	Unplaced	(bronze) Resorts Wear (Group 1)	
2016	Did not compete				
2015	Yoro	Nadia Scarleth Morales	Unplaced		
Honduran Representatives from Miss Honduras
Did not compete between 2013—2014
2012	Yoro	Odily Alvarenga	Unplaced		
2011	Bay Islands	Stephany Hernández Martínez	Unplaced		
2010	Did not compete				
2009	—	Alejandra Maria Mendoza David	Unplaced		
2008	Francisco Morazán	Kenia Melissa Andrade	Unplaced		
Honduran Representatives from Señorita Honduras
2007	Did not compete				
2006	—	Lesly Gabriela Molina Kristoff	Unplaced		
2005	—	Ruth María Arita Luna	Unplaced		
2004	Francisco Morazán	Gabriela Dennisse Zavala Irias	Top 8	Best in National Costume	
2003	Choluteca	Dania Patricia Prince Méndez	Miss Earth 2003		
2002	—	Leslie Paredes Barahona	Unplaced		Closed election

== See also ==
- Miss Grand Honduras
