= Miss Zimbabwe =

National beauty pageant in Zimbabwe

Miss Universe Zimbabwe Organization
- Formation: 1981
- Type: Beauty pageant
- Headquarters: Harare
- Location: Zimbabwe
- Official language: English
- President: Tendai Hunda
- Affiliations: Miss Universe
- Website: missuniversezimbabwe.com

Miss Universe Zimbabwe is a national beauty pageant in Zimbabwe that began in 1980. The current director and national director is Tendai Hunda.

== History ==
Miss Zimbabwe was founded in 1980 when the national beauty pageant was transformed from Miss Rhodesia after attaining independence.

=== Sash titles ===
In 2011, Miss Tourism Zimbabwe was crowned Miss World Zimbabwe, Miss Tourism Zimbabwe, and Miss Universe Zimbabwe. Especially for Miss Universe Zimbabwe did not allow to compete at Miss Universe by Miss Universe Organization. As a result in 2011, for the first time, the Miss Universe Zimbabwe title was competed at Miss International 2011 in Chengdu, China and she was awarded the most expressive award.

=== Resignations ===
In 2014, chairperson Marry Chiwenga said the reasons for the 22-year-old university law student's resignation were “a prerequisite to both the Miss Zimbabwe and the Miss World pageants”. Thabiso is understood to have volunteered the information which necessitated her stepping down to the Trust. Thabiso is likely to be replaced by first princess Tendai Hunda. The current president and National Director is Patience Muzanenhamo-Lusengo.

== Directorships ==
=== Miss Universe ===
- Miss Parade, Modusa Promotion by Angeline Chinyoka (Agency Unveils 'Beauty And Brains' Modelling Contest) (1998―2000)
- Yvette D'Almeida-Chakras (2001)
- Tendai Hunda (2023—present)

=== Miss Supranational ===
- The Zimbabwean Queen Organization, Farai Zembeni (2022―present)

== Titleholders ==
Here those were using the name of Miss Zimbabwe titleholders. Later in 2017, the organization moved to the Miss World Zimbabwe organization.

Year	Miss Zimbabwe
1980	Shirley Nyanyiwa
1981	Juliet Nyathi
1982	Caroline Murinda
1992	Anne-Marie Mombeyarara
1993	Karen Stally
1994	Angeline Musasiwa
1995	Dionne Best
1996	Nomusa Ndiweni
1997	Una Patel
1998	Annette Kambarami
1999	Brita Masalethulini
2000	Victoria Moyo
2001	Nokhuthula Mpuli
2002	Linda van Beek
2003	Phoebe Monjane
2004	Oslie Muringai
2005	Lorraine Maphala
2006	Nomusa Ndiweni
2007	Caroline Marufu
2009	Vanessa Sibanda
2010	Samantha Ntombizodwa Tshuma
2011	Malaika Mushandu
2012	Bongani Dlakama
2014	Thabiso Phiri
2014	Cathrine Makaya
2015	Annie-Grace Mutambu
2017	Chiedza Mhosva
2018	Belinda Potts
Year	Miss Universe Zimbabwe
2023	Brooke Bruk-Jackson
2024	Sakhile Dube
2025	Lyshanda Moyas

Year	Miss Universe Zimbabwe	Runners-Up					
Year	Miss Universe Zimbabwe	Miss World Zimbabwe	Miss International Zimbabwe	Miss Supranational Zimbabwe	Miss Intercontinental Zimbabwe	Top Model Zimbabwe	Miss Cosmo Zimbabwe
2026	Roseanna Hall	Brunette Makanaka Makanyiso	Ruvimbo Njomboro	Nicole Nyawera	Virginia Tlou Nyambe	Jemima Mandemwa	Malaika Mushandu

== Titleholders under Miss Zimbabwe org. ==
=== Miss Universe Zimbabwe ===
Color key

- : Declared as Winner
- : Ended as runner-up
- : Ended as one of the finalists or semi-finalists
- : Ended as Special awards winner

Since its inception in 1997, the Miss Parade beauty pageant has improved in quality and stature; qualifying it as one of Zimbabwe's top annual catwalk highlights, alongside Miss Zimbabwe, Supermodel and Miss Universe. The pageant has become one of the most glamorous, judging by the successes of some of its most recent winners. It has launched a number of Zimbabwean girls into successful modeling and other related careers. The last edition of Miss Universe Zimbabwe was Tsungai Muswerakuenda, which expired on 31 March 2002 which means the title has no current holder. The Miss Universe Zimbabwe was officially directed by Yvette D'Almeida Chakras (Miss Zimbabwe Universe 1994).

Year	Province	Miss Zimbabwe	Placement at Miss Universe	Special Award(s)	Notes
Tendai Hunda directorship — a franchise holder to Miss Universe from 2023
2026	Midlands	Roseanna Hall	Did not compete		
2025	Midlands	Lyshanda Moyas	Top 30		
2024	Bulawayo	Sakhile Dube	Top 30		
2023	Harare	Brooke Bruk-Jackson	Unplaced	Voice For Change (Silver Winner)	
Did not compete between 2012—2022: Since economic problems have hit Zimbabwe, even high inflation has meant that Zimbabwe is not financially ready to compete in Miss Universe.
2011	Harare	Lisa Morgan	Did not compete		Lisa was crowned as Miss Universe Zimbabwe but she did not come to Miss Universe. Since the organization did not have a Miss Universe license, she was finally allocated to Miss International 2011 in China.
Yvette D'Almeida Chakras directorship — a franchise holder to Miss Universe in 2001
Did not compete between 2002—2010: Zimbabwe did not compete at Miss Universe due to various political and social problems that it is facing at this very moment.
2001	Harare	Tsungai Muswerakuenda	Unplaced		
Miss Paradise Competition - Modusa Promotion by Angeline Chinyoka (Agency Unveils 'Beauty And Brains' Modelling Contest) directorship — a franchise holder to Miss Universe between 1998―2000
2000	Harare	Corrinne Crewe	Top 10	Best National Costume (Top 3)	
Did not compete in 1999
1998	Harare	Rachel Stuart	Unplaced		
Miss Zimbabwe Universe directorship — a franchise holder to Miss Universe between 1994―1997
1997	Harare	Lorraine Magwenzi	Unplaced		
1996	Harare	Langa Sibanda-lloyd	Unplaced		
Did not compete in 1995
1994	Harare	Yvette D'Almeida-Chakras	Unplaced		

=== Wins by province ===
Province	Titles	Years
Harare	8	1994, 1996, 1997, 1998, 2000, 2001, 2011, 2023
Midlands	1	2025
Bulawayo	1	2024

== Former license holders ==
=== Miss World Zimbabwe ===
Starting in 2017 Miss World Zimbabwe revealed its new name "Miss World Zimbabwe" competition. The primary winner is expected to represent her country at the Miss World pageant. This pageant was chaired by Marry Mubaiwa Chiwenga. The current president and National Director for Miss World is Patience Muzanenhamo-Lusengo.
