= Miss South Africa 2023 =

65th Miss South Africa Pageant

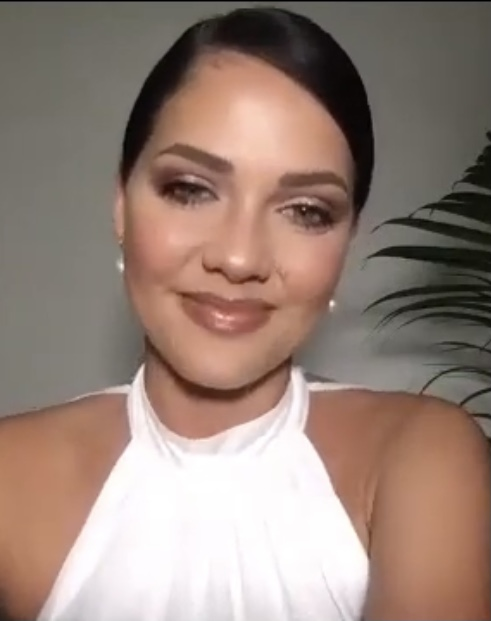
- Natasha Joubert, Miss South Africa 2023
- Date: 13 August 2023
- Presenters: Bonang Matheba
- Entertainment: Siki Jo-An; Jimmy Nevis; Brenda Mtambo; Robot Boii
- Venue: SunBet Arena, Time Square, Pretoria
- Broadcaster: SABC 3; Miss South Africa App
- Entrants: 7
- Placements: 5
- Winner: Natasha Joubert; Gauteng

Miss South Africa 2023 was the 65th edition of the Miss South Africa pageant, held at the SunBet Arena in Pretoria, South Africa, on 13 August 2023.

Ndavi Nokeri of Limpopo crowned Natasha Joubert of Gauteng as her successor at the end of the event. Due to Joubert representing South Africa at Miss Universe 2020, her first runner-up Bryoni Govender was the country representative at Miss Universe 2023.

== Results ==
=== Placements ===
Placement	Contestant
Miss South Africa 2023	Gauteng – Natasha Joubert
1st Runner-Up (Miss Universe South Africa 2023)	Gauteng – Bryoni Govender
2nd Runner-Up	Western Cape – Nande Mabala
Miss Universe South Africa 2025	Eastern Cape – Melissa Nayimuli
Top 5	Eastern Cape – Homba Mazaleni
Top 7	Northern Cape – Anke Rothmann; Western Cape – Jordan van der Vyver

== Pageant ==
Starting this year, the top 12 delegates participated in a reality show called Crown Chasers, where they competed in challenges reflecting the Miss South Africa values. Each week, one contestant was eliminated, wherein in the end, only 7 finalistas competed on final.

== Crown Chasers ==
The official Top 12 finalists who would participate in Crown Chasers were announced on 8 June. During the show, Lebohang Raputsoe, Lungo Katete, Ané Oosthuysen, and Keaoleboga Nkashe were eliminated, while Levern José withdrew from the competition amidst bullying allegations which resurfaced from former classmates on Twitter. The seven finalists advanced to the televised Miss South Africa 2023 final were revealed on 6 August.

Delegate	Age	Status	Province	Hometown	Finish	Placement
Natasha Joubert	26	Finalist	Gauteng	Tshwane	—N/a	
Bryoni Govender	27	Finalist	Gauteng	Kempton Park	—N/a	
Nande Mabala	25	Finalist	Western Cape	Zwelethemba	—N/a	
Homba Mazaleni	23	Finalist	Eastern Cape	East London	—N/a	
Melissa Nayimuli	27	Finalist	Eastern Cape	Butterworth	—N/a	
Anke Rothmann	23	Finalist	Northern Cape	Upington	—N/a	
Jordan van der Vyver	27	Finalist	Western Cape	Durbanville	—N/a	
Keaoleboga Nkashe	27	Eliminated	North West	Itsoseng	Episode 5	8th place
Ané Oosthuysen	25	Eliminated	Gauteng	Vanderbijlpark	Episode 4	9th place
Levern José	24	Withdrew	Northern Cape	Kimberley	Episode 3	10th place
Lungo Katete	26	Eliminated	Gauteng	Midrand	Episode 2	11th place
Lebohang Raputsoe	24	Eliminated	Gauteng	Sharpeville	Episode 1	12th place

=== Elimination chart ===
Elimination chart
Contestant	Episode 1	Episode 2	Episode 3	Episode 4	Episode 5
Anke	HIGH		LOW	HIGH	FINAL
Bryoni			HIGH		FINAL
Homba				WIN	FINAL
Jordan		HIGH		LOW	FINAL
Melissa	WIN		HIGH		FINAL
Nande	LOW	HIGH			FINAL
Natasha	HIGH	WIN	WIN	HIGH	FINAL
Keaoleboga		LOW	LOW	LOW	OUT
Ané	LOW		LOW	OUT	
Levern		LOW	QUIT		
Lungo		OUT			
Lebohang	OUT				

Colour key:

Contestant was chosen by the judges as the winner of the episode.
Contestant was included by the judges in the top three of the episode, but not the winner.
Contestant got through to the next episode, but was not in the top three or bottom three.
Contestant was included by the judges in the bottom three of the episode, but was not eliminated.
Contestant was eliminated from the competition.
Contestant withdrew from the competition.
Contestant was selected to be a Miss South Africa 2023 finalist.
Contestant was chosen by the judges as the winner of the episode, and selected to be a Miss South Africa 2023 finalist.
Contestant was included by the judges in the bottom three of the episode, and selected to be a Miss South Africa 2023 finalist.

== Top 30 ==
The Top 30 semifinalists were announced on 24 May. The semifinalists who did not advance to the Top 12 were:

Delegate	Age	Province	Hometown
Anelisa Nxele	22	KwaZulu-Natal	Inanda
Angie Mkwanazi	23	KwaZulu-Natal	Durban
Barbara Moagi	22	North West	Mahikeng
Carmen Barnard	24	Gauteng	Mabopane
Hestie Jooste	25	Gauteng	Pretoria
Karla Pienaar	23	North West	Hartbeespoort
Khanya Desi	22	Eastern Cape	Frankfort
Lerato Maponya	26	Gauteng	Johannesburg
Malandi Marais	21	Western Cape	Citrusdal
Mbali Mbalu	25	Western Cape	Mandalay
Michelle Kruger	28	Mpumalanga	Witbank
Naledi Mara	23	Limpopo	Seshego
Ndyebo Lurayi	26	Gauteng	Midrand
Nicole Eksteen	28	Western Cape	Stellenbosch
Oreabetse Molefe	23	Limpopo	Northam
Rozelle Bester	27	Free State	Leribe
Sibusisiwe Zwane	20	KwaZulu-Natal	Shelly Beach
Thandolwenkosi Hadebe	22	KwaZulu-Natal	Bergville

== Judges ==
=== Semifinals ===
- Bokang Montjane-Tshabalala – Miss South Africa 2010
- Nobukhosi Mukwevho – founder of Khosi Nkosi
- Stephanie Weil - CEO of Miss South Africa

=== Crown Chasers ===
Bonang Matheba and Leandie Du Randt served as judges for all episodes of Crown Chasers, while the following guest judges were featured in each episode:

- Tamaryn Green – Miss South Africa 2018 (Episode 1)
- Vanessa Carreira – Miss South Africa 2001 (Episode 2)
- Ntandose Mosibi – television presenter (Episode 3)
- Nobukhosi Mukwevho – founder of Khosi Nkosi (Episode 4)
- Gert-Johan Coetzee – fashion designer (Episode 5)
- Koo Govender – media mogul and CEO of Dentsu South Africa (Episode 5)
- Bokang Montjane – Miss South Africa 2010 (Episode 5)

=== Final ===
- Leandie Du Randt – actress, presenter, author and entrepreneur
- R'Bonney Gabriel – Miss Universe 2022 from the United States
- Devi Sankaree Govender – investigative television journalist
- Thuso Mbedu – actress
- Jo-Ann Strauss – Miss South Africa 2000
