= Rich Mnisi =

South African fashion designer (born 1993)

- Born: Rich Fumani Mnisi; 14 December 1993 (age 32); Johannesburg, South Africa
- Education: Leaders in the Science of Fashion (LISOF)
- Occupations: Fashion designer; businessman
- Years active: 2012–present
- Known for: RICH MNISI

Rich Fumani Mnisi (born 14 December 1993) is a South African fashion designer and businessman. He is best known as the founder and creative director of a luxury fashion brand RICH MNISI, founded in 2015. He appeared on Forbes Africa 30 Under 30 list in 2019.

== Early life ==
Rich Mnisi was born in Johannesburg, South Africa. He developed an interest in fashion and design at a young age and later pursued formal training in fashion design. He graduated from the Leaders in the Science of Fashion (LISOF) where he obtained BA in Fashion Design and Business Management in 2014.

== Career ==
Following his graduation, Mnisi launched his first design studio, initially operating under the name OATH Studio and received early industry recognition after winning the Africa Fashion International for Young Designer of the Year award at Mercedes Benz Fashion Week Africa in 2014. In 2015, he rebranded the label as RICH MNISI, establishing a design identity focused on seasonless collections, fluid tailoring, and conceptual storytelling influenced by his Tsonga heritage and lived experiences. In 2019, he was named on the Forbes Africa 30 Under 30 list in the creative category. He received the Emerging Designer of the Year award at the Essence Best in Black Fashion Awards in late 2019. In 2020, he was listed with Laduma Ngxokolo (MaXhosa) in British Vogue's list of 7 African fashion brands.

In 2021, Mnisi expanded his practice beyond fashion into furniture design and have been exhibited internationally. He has collaborated with global and regional brands, including Adidas in 2022, and H&M for street wear collection, bringing his design philosophy to a wider commercial audience. In 2024, he won the Best Designer award at the Africa Fashion Up competition during Paris Fashion Week, further establishing his presence on the global fashion stage.

== Personal life ==
Mnisi is openly gay, having come out to his family at a young age before publicly addressing his identity as a "visual language" through his fashion. He was raised in a Christian household, he has spoken candidly about the journey from initially praying against his sexuality to eventually embracing his queer masculinity and Tsonga heritage.

In 2023, Mnisi is a prominent advocate for the LGBTQIA+ community and frequently collaborates on global Pride campaigns with brands like Adidas for adidas x RICH MNISI "Let Love Be Your Legacy" campaign, which focused on active allyship. He often uses his platform to support queer visibility in Africa, notably donating proceeds from his work to The Pride Shelter Trust to support LGBTQIA+ individuals in crisis in 2021.

== Public image ==
Mnisi has upgraded his status as a "global visionary" by dressing an elite roster of international icons and local superstars. His brand gained significant global momentum when Beyoncé dressed a custom blouse and skirt during her 2018 visit to South Africa, followed by Ciara, who featured his avant garde designs in her "Freak Me" music video and on high profile television appearances. International British supermodel Naomi Campbell further amplified his reach by wearing a signature Mnisi jumpsuit for a major United Kingdom broadcast. In 2020, he launched the most expensive face mask during COVID-19, costs R2000 named Alkebulan and made with Swarovski Cherry Leopard Crystals. In 2021, South African citizens were shocked of RICH MNISI's Xibelani skirt cost R60 000.

In December 2024, he hosted the 5th Annual 2 Million Icons Part which was attended by local celebrities and went viral on social media. He is the designer of choice for South Africa’s most influential figures, including Bonang Matheba, Pearl Thusi, and Black Coffee, and he recently featured veteran actress Connie Ferguson in a major 2025 campaign.
