= Johan Coetzee =

Johan Coetzee may refer to:

- Aranos Coetzee (born 1988), Namibian international rugby union player
- Gert-Johan Coetzee (born 1987), South African fashion designer
