= Amira Rasool =

American entrepreneur

- Born: South Orange, New Jersey, U.S.
- Occupation: Entrepreneur

Amira Rasool is an American entrepreneur and former fashion journalist. She is the founder of The Folklore, a company that distributes fashion and lifestyle products from Africa and the African diaspora.

== Early life and education ==
Rasool was born and raised in South Orange, New Jersey. Rasool developed an early interest in fashion and started a fashion blog during high school. While attending Rutgers University, she interned at various magazines, including Women's Wear Daily and Marie Claire. Her blog led to a two-year internship at the trade publication Women's Wear Daily beginning in 2014.

She graduated with a Bachelor of Arts in African American and African Studies from Rutgers University and later earned a Master of Philosophy in African Studies from the University of Cape Town. Rasool has said that a trip to South Africa during her senior year of college was where she decided to start a business; she moved to Cape Town after leaving V Magazine.

== Career ==
Rasool worked as a fashion assistant at V Magazine and has contributed to Marie Claire, Glamour, Teen Vogue, and others. Her work primarily focused on Black culture in relation to fashion, travel, music, visual arts, and social justice.

=== The Folklore ===
In 2018, Rasool founded The Folklore, an e-commerce platform offering fashion and lifestyle products from Africa and the diaspora. In its direct-to-consumer phase the company sourced products, arranged shipping and handled last-mile delivery for customers in 20 countries, including the United States. The company initially began with a $30,000 investment. Rasool was 22 years old when she started the company. It later expanded to include The Folklore Shop, an e-commerce platform offering a curated selection of sustainable and diverse global brands.

In April 2022, the company launched The Folklore Connect, a membership-based business-to-business platform on which retailers apply to browse and order from vetted brands; it opened in beta with ten brands, among them Rich Mnisi, and ten retailers. The wider business was reorganized as The Folklore Group, with the original retail site becoming a shopping aggregator and a media arm, The Folklore Edit, carrying interviews and industry analysis. The pre-seed round that funded the launch was led by Slauson & Co., with participation from the Fearless Fund and Black investors including the WNBA player Nneka Ogwumike. In 2022, Rasool raised $1.7 million for The Folklore.

In 2023, The Folklore Group announced a partnership with Nordstrom, the largest retailer to join the platform at that point; The Folklore Connect then listed more than 100 brands. The company has also held seasonal showrooms during New York Fashion Week; its third annual showroom, in February 2025, featured 35 independent brands from countries including the United States, the United Kingdom, Nigeria, South Africa, Tunisia and Mexico.

In 2024, she raised an additional $3.4m in funding for The Folklore, led by the venture capital fund Benchstrength. The round was led by Kenneth Chenault Jr. and John Monagle, both formerly of General Catalyst, with participation from existing investors Slauson & Co., Techstars and Black Tech Nation Ventures. By that point the company had raised $6.22 million in total, including $120,000 from a Techstars accelerator in 2021.

== Recognition ==
In 2024, Rasool was included on the Forbes 30 Under 30 list. In January 2025, Black Enterprise named her to its 40 Under 40 list, which recognized achievements made during 2024.
