= Nompumelelo Maduna =

South African beauty pageant titleholder (born 1995)

- Born: Nompumelelo Sweli Maduna; 26 May 1995 (age 31); Soweto, Gauteng, South Africa
- Education: University of Johannesburg
- Occupations: Model; philanthropist
- Height: 1.65 m (5 ft 5 in)
- Beauty pageant titleholder
- Title: Miss Earth South Africa 2021
- Major competitions: Miss South Africa 2019; (Top 5); Miss Earth South Africa 2021; (Winner); Miss Earth 2021; (Top 20); Miss South Africa 2024; (1st Runner-Up)

Nompumelelo Sweli Maduna (born 26 May 1995) is a South African model, philanthropist and beauty pageant titleholder who was crowned the Miss Earth South Africa 2021 and represented South Africa in Philippines and was placed in the Top 20.

She also participated in Miss South Africa 2022 where she was placed in the Top 5 and return in the 66th edition of Miss South Africa where she was the 1st Runner-up of Miss South Africa 2024.

== Early life ==
Maduna was born on 26 May 1995, in Soweto, Gauteng, South Africa. She attended the University of Johannesburg, where she completed with Bachelor of Commerce Honours in Marketing Management.

== Pageantry ==
=== Miss South Africa 2019 ===
Maduna began her pageantry career after entered the 61st edition of Miss South Africa in 2019 representing Gauteng province. In the finale she was placed in the Top 5.

=== Miss Earth 2021 ===
In 2021, Maduna continued to build her pageant career when she was crowned Miss Earth South Africa 2021. As the national beauty pageant titleholder, she represented her country South Africa at the international Miss Earth 2021 pageant and she was placed in the Top 20. Her work reflected her passion for protecting the planet and empowering others to take action for environmental change.

=== Miss South Africa 2024 ===
Maduna returned to the pageant stage in 2024, competing once again for the 66th edition of Miss South Africa crown. Before the finale, she won Crown Chasers pageant competition by the organisation multiple times and finished as the 1st Runner-up of the Miss South Africa 2024. Fans and the nation made debate that she was supposed to be crowned as the winner over her queen Mia le Roux.

== Other ventures ==
Maduna has launched a podcast namely "Impumelelo Girls Mentorship" to empower and inspire many youth all over South Africa in March 2025. She is fully committed to empower many women through her work with Impumelelo Girls Mentorship.

Awards and achievements
Preceded by Lungo Katete	Miss Earth South Africa; 2021	Succeeded by Ziphozethu Sithebe
