= Bajabulise Thela =

South African beauty pageant titleholder

- Born: Bajabulise Atalanta Thela; 18 October 2003 (age 23); KaNyamazane, Mpumalanga, South Africa
- Occupations: Model; philanthropist; flight attendant
- Height: 1.85 m (6 ft 1 in)
- Beauty pageant titleholder
- Title: Miss Teen Grand South Africa 2021; Miss Mpumalanga 2024; Miss African Beauty Universe 2026; Miss Universe South Africa 2026
- Major competitions: Miss Teen Grand South Africa; (Winner); Miss Teen Grand Universe 2021; (Withdrew); (Teen Universe International Ambassador); Miss African Beauty Universe 2026; (Winner); Miss Universe 2026; (TBD)

Bajabulise Atalanta Thela (born 18 October 2003) is a South African model, philanthropist and beauty pageant titleholder who won the Miss African Beauty Universe 2026. She will represent South Africa at Miss Universe 2026 in San Juan, Puerto Rico as Miss Universe South Africa 2026.

Thela also won several beauty titles includes Miss Teen Grand South Africa 2021, Teen Universe International Ambassador and Miss Mpumalanga 2024. She is the founder of Mambane Foundation.

== Pageantry ==
=== Miss Teen Grand South Africa 2021 ===
Thela began her pageantry career at a very young age when she became the first Miss Teen Grand South Africa 2021. But she failed to complete at international stages, because she faced financial problems. In 2023, she was crowned Teen Universe South Africa 2023 and later represented South Africa as the ambassador at the Teen Universe International beauty pageant in Spain with Hlonela Mrwetyana.

=== Miss Mpumalanga 2024 ===
In 2024, Thela was crowned the winner of Miss Mpumalanga 2024. During her reign, she actively partnered with organizations like the Mpumalanga Economic Regulator (MER) to promote responsible behavior and youth education. After her final walk in 2025, she entered the Miss South Africa 2025, but she was not selected.

=== Miss African Beauty Universe 2026 ===
In May 2026, Thela joined Miss African Beauty South Africa competition, where she was competing for three titles and included in the top 30. In June, she was included in the top 20 of the competition after Shannon Benting was crowned the winner of Miss African Beauty Supranational 2026. She was later included in the top 9 finalists of the Miss Universe South Africa 2026. On the 18th July 2026, she won Miss African Beauty Universe 2026 and recently crowned the winner of Miss Universe South Africa 2026.

=== Miss Universe 2026 ===
Thela will represent the South Africa at the Miss Universe 2026 competition in San Juan, Puerto Rico in November 2026. On 6 November, she departed from O. R. Tambo International Airport and arrived on 8 November. On 17 November, she made it to the Top 30 of Miss Universe's most–voted fan favourites.

== Advocacy ==
Thela has participated in youth–focused awareness activities in the Mpumalanga province. In 2024, she was identified as an ambassador for the Mpumalanga Economic Regulator (MER) and participated in school–based activities addressing underage gambling and related risks. She founded her own nonprofit organization, Mambane Foundation. Her foundation focus on addressing hunger and malnutrition, food insecurity and poverty, as well as supporting the empowerment of young girls.

Awards and achievements
Preceded by Melissa Nayimuli	Miss Universe South Africa; 2026	Succeeded by Incumbent
New title	Miss African Beauty Universe; 2026	Succeeded by Incumbent
Preceded by Bokamoso Machika	Miss Mpumalanga; 2024	Succeeded by Malibongwe Mkhwanazi
New title	Miss Teen Grand South Africa; 2021	Succeeded by Jordan Jansen van Rensburg
