= Miss Universe Nigeria =

Beauty pageant

- Formation: 1983 (Original run); 2023 (Revival)
- Type: Beauty pageant
- Headquarters: Lagos
- Location: Nigeria
- Members: Miss Universe; Miss Supranational
- Pageant organiser: Silverbird Group
- Website: missuniversenigeria.org

Miss Universe Nigeria (MUN) is a national beauty pageant that selects Nigeria's official representative to Miss Universe—one of the Big Four beauty pageants.

The current titleholder is Danielle Adewusi of Lagos. She will represent Nigeria at the Miss Universe 2026 competition in Puerto Rico.

== History ==
Daily Times - MBGN's rival pageant Miss Nigeria organisers - originally owned the country's rights to Miss Universe, but ceased to send winners after their only representative Edna Park's onstage ruckus at the semi-final. In 1983, following heavy publicity, Omololu Ojehomon won the 1984 edition of the newly established "Miss Universe Nigeria" competition, but this maiden edition was considered a failure as Ojehomon was ultimately dethroned before she could compete abroad. Fashion model Yemi Fawaz, who placed third, described the contest as "highly controversial" owing to the selection of two contestants as second-place winners, and lambasted the judges' bias against mixed-race delegates. She also criticised Silverbird for ignoring contestants who had competed in the organisation's first-ever pageant.

Three years later, Silverbird president Ben Murray-Bruce relaunched the pageant as Most Beautiful Girl in Nigeria, with Law student Lynda Chuba-Ikpeazu winning the contest and becoming the country's first Miss Universe representative in 23 years. MBGN soon acquired more franchises including Miss World, Miss International, and later Miss Supranational, with MBGN titleholders automatically became representatives. Computer Science and Mathematics student Agbani Darego – who would later win Miss World – became the first Nigerian to place at Miss Universe in 2001.

In 2005, Silverbird created different titles for MBGN runners-up, including MBGN Universe, while MBGN's overall winner was renamed "MBGN World" and sent to Miss World only. Human Science student Roseline Amusu became the first MBGN Universe, but Nigeria failed to place until 2019 when Health and Human Services student Olutosin Araromi reached the Miss Universe top 20 after an 18-year drought.

In 2023, Silverbird revived Miss Universe Nigeria, with Murray-Bruce's brother, Guy, stating that owing to Miss Universe's evolving criteria, MUN would take on a new format from MBGN, making them two entirely different entities. Unlike the latter pageant which focused on mostly Westernised beauty standards, MUN is all-inclusive, irrespective of marital status, body type, shade, height or weight.

In 2023, MBGN 2017 Ugochi Ihezue became the first woman to win two Silverbird-organised pageants since Bianca Onoh (MBGN and Miss Intercontinental) in 1989.

=== Background ===
2023 marked a revival of the original contest organised by Silverbird Productions, Nigeria's Miss Universe franchise holder since 1983. The winner automatically becomes Nigeria's Miss Universe delegate, while the 1st runner-up is the Miss Supranational representative. Although Hannah Iribhogbe occasionally used the Miss Nigeria Universe title during her reign, she had actually competed in MBGN 2022.

== Titleholders ==
| Year | State | Miss Universe Nigeria | International Placement | Special Awards | Notes |
|---|---|---|---|---|---|
Original Edition
| 1984 | N/A | Omololu Ojehomon | Did not compete | | Held in 1983 |
Revival Edition
| 2023 | Imo | Mitchell Ihezue | Unplaced |
| 2024 | Taraba | Chidimma Adetshina | 1st Runner-Up |
| 2025 | Anambra | Onyinyechi Basil | Unplaced |
| 2026 | Lagos | Danielle Adewusi | TBD |

== Placements ==
- : Declared as Winner
- : Ended as runner-up or top 5/6 qualification
- : Ended as one of the finalists or semifinalists
- : Ended as special awards winner

On occasion, when the winner does not qualify (due to age) for either contest, a runner-up is sent.

| Year | State | Miss Universe Nigeria | Placement at Miss Universe | Special award(s) | Notes |
Ben Murray-Bruce directorship — a franchise holder to Miss Universe from 1987
| 2026 | Lagos | Danielle Adewusi | TBA | | |
| 2025 | Anambra | Onyinyechi Basil | Unplaced | | |
| 2024 | Taraba | Chidimma Adetshina | 1st Runner-Up | | She was former Miss South Africa 2024 contestant finished in the Top 10 of the competition; She is half Nigerian and South African. |
| 2023 | Imo | Ugochi Mitchell Ihezue | Unplaced | | Mitchell previously made her pageantry in 2017 as the Most Beautiful Girl in Nigeria and went to Miss World 2017 where she entered the Top 15 semi-finalists. |
Between 2005 and 2022: The MGBN Universe was the right title to Miss Universe competition. The coronation held under the MBGN national pageant, Ben Murray-Bruce directorship.
| 2022 | Edo | Hannah Iribhogbe | Unplaced | | |
| 2021 | Anambra | Maristella Okpala | Unplaced | Best National Costume | |
Due to the impact of COVID-19 pandemic, no representative in 2020
| 2019 | Taraba | Olutosin Araromi | Top 20 | | |
| 2018 | Lagos | Aramide Lopez | Unplaced | | |
| 2017 | Sokoto | Stephanie Agbasi | Unplaced | | |
| 2016 | Anambra | Unoaku Anyadike | Unplaced | | Since no pageant in 2016, Anyadike was appointed by MBGN Organization to represent Nigeria at Miss Universe 2016 in Manila, the Philippines. |
| 2015 | Ebonyi | Debbie Collins | Unplaced | | |
| 2014 | Edo | Queen Osem Celestine | Unplaced | Miss Congeniality | |
| 2013 | Imo | Stephanie Okwu | Unplaced | | |
| 2012 | Cross River | Isabella Ayuk | Unplaced | | Actually, Ayuk was selected to the Miss World pageant, due to age restriction, Ayuk disallowed to compete at Miss World, and she went to Miss Universe 2012 in Las Vegas. Meanwhile Damiete Granville who selected to Miss Universe pageant, replaced Ayuk to join Miss World 2012 in China. |
| 2011 | Bayelsa | Sophie Gemal | Unplaced | | |
| 2010 | Niger | Ngozi Odaloni | Unplaced | | |
| 2009 | Delta | Sandra Otohwo | Unplaced | | |
| 2008 | Taraba | Stephanie Oforka | Unplaced | | |
| 2007 | Bayelsa | Ebinabo Potts-Johnson | Unplaced | | |
| 2006 | Delta | Tienepre Alexandra Oki | Unplaced | | |
| 2005 | Lagos | Roseline Amusu | Unplaced | | |
Before 2005:The MGBN was the right title to Miss Universe competition. The main winner of the MBGN national pageant usually competed at Miss Universe and Miss World competitions.
| 2004 | Edo | Anita Uwagbale | Unplaced | | |
| 2003 | Cross River | Celia Bissong | Unplaced | | |
| 2002 | Anambra | Chinenye Ochuba | Unplaced | | |
| 2001 | Rivers | Agbani Darego | Top 10 | | Later, Agbani won Miss World 2001 in South Africa. |
| 2000 | Rivers | Matilda Kerry | Unplaced | | |
| 1999 | Imo | Angela Ukpoma | Unplaced | | |
| 1998 | Imo | Chika Chikezie | Unplaced | | |
Did not compete between 1996—1997
| 1995 | Kogi | Toyin Raji | Unplaced | Miss Congeniality | |
| 1994 | Benue | Susan Hart | Unplaced | | |
| 1993 | Lagos | Rihole Gbinigie | Unplaced | | |
| 1992 | Akwa Ibom | Sandra Petgrave | Unplaced | | |
| 1991 | Lagos | Tonia Okogbenin | Unplaced | | |
| 1990 | Niger | Sabina Umeh | Unplaced | | |
| 1989 | Abuja | Bianca Onoh | Unplaced | | |
| 1988 | Warri | Omasan Buwa | Unplaced | | |
| 1987 | Imo | Lynda Chuba-Ikpeazu | Unplaced | | |

=== Wins by state ===
| State | Titles | Years |
|---|---|---|
| Imo | 5 | 1987, 1998, 1999, 2013, 2023 |
| Anambra | 4 | 2002, 2016, 2021, 2025 |
| Lagos | 4 | 1991, 1993, 2005, 2018 |
| Taraba | 3 | 2008, 2019, 2024 |
| Edo | 3 | 2004, 2014, 2022 |
| Cross River | 2 | 2003, 2012 |
| Bayelsa | 2 | 2007, 2011 |
| Niger | 2 | 1990, 2010 |
| Delta | 2 | 2006, 2009 |
| Rivers | 2 | 2000, 2001 |
| Sokoto | 1 | 2017 |
| Ebonyi | 1 | 2015 |
| Kogi | 1 | 1995 |
| Benue | 1 | 1994 |
| Akwa Ibom | 1 | 1992 |
| Abuja | 1 | 1989 |
| Warri | 1 | 1988 |

=== Miss Supranational Nigeria ===
- : Declared as Winner
- : Ended as runner-up or top 5/6 qualification
- : Ended as one of the finalists or semifinalists
- : Ended as special awards winner

| Year | Miss Supranational Namibia | Placement | Special award(s) | Notes |
Silverbird Group directorship — a franchise holder to Miss Supranational from 2010
| 2027 | TBA | TBA | TBA | |
| 2026 | Ndah Eno | 3rd Runner-Up | | |
| 2025 | Paula Ezendu | Unplaced | | |
| 2024 | Sectra Okundaye | Top 25 | | |
| 2023 | Genevieve Ukatu | Unplaced | | |
| 2022 | Adaeze Chineme | Unplaced | | |
| 2021 | Akeelah Sabiqoh Aminu | Unplaced | | |
Due to the impact of COVID-19 pandemic, no competition held in 2020
| 2019 | Oluchi Kalu | | | |
| 2018 | Daniella Orumwense | Top 25 | | |
| 2016 | Adaeze Marian Obasi | Unplaced | | |
| 2015 | Stephanie Omogun | Unplaced | | |
| 2013 | Neri Omoregie | Unplaced | | |
| 2012 | Osuemhegbe Ugonoh | Unplaced | | |
| 2011 | Belema Julius Afiesimama | Unplaced | | |
| 2010 | Juliet Ndukwe | Unplaced | | |

== Notable contestants ==
- Nyekachi Esther Douglas, MBGN 2019 (2023 & 2024)
- Florence Ibiyemi Fawaz, model (1984)
- Chidimma Vanessa Adetshina, model (2024)
- Damilola Bolarinde, Miss Grand Nigeria 2022 (2025)
- Aisha Abubakar, Miss Global Nigeria 2026 (2025)

== See also ==
- MBGN
- Miss Nigeria
- Mr Nigeria
