= Lebohang Raputsoe =

South African beauty pageant titleholder (1999)

- Born: Lebogang Raputsoe; 26 March 1999 (age 27); Sharpeville, Gauteng, South Africa
- Education: North-West University; University of Pretoria
- Occupations: Model; Entrepreneur; Philanthropist
- Height: 1.64 m (5 ft 5 in)
- Beauty pageant titleholder
- Title: Miss Cosmo South Africa 2024; Miss Supranational South Africa 2025
- Major competitions: Miss South Africa 2023; (Top 12); Miss Cosmo 2024; (Top 21); Miss Supranational 2025; (Top 24)

Lebogang "Lebo" Raputsoe (born 26 March 1999) is a South African model, entrepreneur, philanthropist and beauty pageant titleholder. She was crowned the Miss Cosmo South Africa 2024 and later represented her country in the first edition of Miss Cosmo 2024 where she was placed in the top 21, and Miss Supranational South Africa 2025 and represented her country in the Miss Supranational 2025 where she was placed in the top 24.

== Pageantry ==
=== Miss Cosmo 2024 ===
Raputsoe began her pageantry journey in 2023 when she joined the Miss South Africa 2023 and placed in the top 12, and participated in the Crown Chasers. In 2024, she represented South Africa at Miss Cosmo 2024 in Ho Chi Minh City, Vietnam and she was placed in top 21.

=== Miss Supranational 2025 ===
In 2025, Raputsoe was appointed as Miss Supranational South Africa 2025, and represented her country in an international competition at Miss Supranational 2025 in Nowy Sącz, Poland where she was place in the top 24. During the competition, she placed in the top 10 of Supra Model of the Year.

Awards and achievements
| New title | Miss Cosmo South Africa; 2024 | Succeeded by Pale Legoabe |
| Preceded by Bryoni Govender | Miss Supranational South Africa; 2025 | Succeeded by Shannon Benting |
