= Chidimma Adetshina =

South African beauty pageant titleholder

- Born: Chidimma Vanessa Onwe Adetshina; 8 January 2001 (age 25); Soweto, South Africa
- Height: 1.70 m (5 ft 7 in)
- Beauty pageant titleholder
- Title: Miss Universe Nigeria 2024; Miss Universe Africa and Oceania 2024
- Major competitions: Miss South Africa 2024; (Top 16); Miss Universe Nigeria 2024; (Winner); Miss Universe 2024; (1st Runner-Up); (Miss Universe Africa and Oceania)

Chidimma Vanessa Onwe Adetshina (born 8 January 2001) is a Nigerian South African beauty pageant titleholder who won Miss Universe Nigeria 2024. She represented Nigeria at the Miss Universe 2024 pageant in Mexico and finished as the first runner-up. She was also crowned Miss Universe Africa and Oceania as the highest ranked African Contestant of 2024. Her placement is Nigeria's highest at any Miss Universe pageant.

== Early life ==
Chidimma Vanessa Onwe Adetshina was born in Soweto, South Africa. Her father is Nigerian and is of Igbo descent while her mother is Mozambican. Adetshina grew up in Cape Town, South Africa. As of 2024, she is a law student.

== Pageantry ==
=== Miss South Africa 2024 ===
Adetshina entered Miss South Africa 2024, but following an investigation by the Department of Home Affairs into her mother's citizenship, she withdrew from the pageant, citing concerns for her safety and well-being.

Adetshina garnered support from the public who saw her as a representation of South Africa's diverse population. A South African far-left political party, the Economic Freedom Fighters, publicly defended her, calling for an end to xenophobia in South Africa and advocating for inclusivity, while other parties the African National Congress and the Patriotic Alliance advocated for an investigation into her nationality. The minister of Home Affairs, Leon Schreiber, confirmed that the department could investigate the nationality of Adetshina only after her family requested it.

The Miss South Africa pageant maintained that Adetshina had fulfilled all the requirements to participate in the competition.

In October 2024, the Department of Home Affairs of South Africa revoked her South African identity papers following an investigation into her mother's origins.

In January 2026, Adetshina was arrested for illegally entering South Africa through the Lebombo border. The Department of Home Affairs applied to have her deported from the country; she challenged the application in court, and in August 2026, her deportation case was postponed to February 2027, until the High Court has reviewed her application.

==== Aftermath ====
Due to the victimisation of Adetshina by South Africans, the organizers of the Puebla Festival de las Ideas withdrew its invitations to the South African panelists and guests in 2024. The managers cited in its letter on X that the removal was due to South Africa's undermining of the very principle of justice and equality, as well as human dignity that the festival sought to maintain. The country was no longer listed as the featured country at the festival that took place in Mexico. Following the Miss Universe 2024 event, Chidimma stated of moving to settle in Nigeria. In a BBC Pidgin interview after the pageantry, Adetshina confirmed that she would be retiring from the beauty-queen phase of her life with a new focus on education.

=== Miss Universe Nigeria 2024 ===
On 31 August 2024, Adetshina, represented Taraba State and won Miss Universe Nigeria 2024, at the Eko Hotels and Suites, Victoria Island, Lagos. Competing against 24 other contestants, the event was broadcast on GOtv and YouTube. Adetshina proceeded to represent Nigeria at Miss Universe in Mexico, in November 2024.

=== Miss Universe 2024 ===
Adetshina represented Nigeria at Miss Universe 2024, on 16 November 2024, at the Arena CDMX in Mexico City. Adetshina was first runner-up, against contestants from 126 countries. Denmark's Victoria Kjær Theilvig won the contest. Adetshina's placement is Nigeria's highest at Miss Universe.

==== Miss Universe Africa and Oceania ====
Adetshina was also crowned Miss Universe Africa and Oceania as the highest ranked African Contestant of 2024.

Awards and achievements
Preceded by (Thailand) Anntonia Porsild	Miss Universe 1st Runner-Up; 2024	Succeeded by (Thailand) Praveenar Singh
New title	Miss Universe Africa & Oceania; 2024	Succeeded by (Ivory Coast) Olivia Yacé
Preceded by Ugochi Ihezue	Miss Universe Nigeria; 2024	Succeeded by Basil Onyinyechi
