= Daiana Pereyra =

Argentine beauty pageant titleholder

- Born: Daiana Stefani Pereyra; Posadas, Misiones, Argentina
- Beauty pageant titleholder
- Title: Miss Intercontinental Argentina 2022; Miss International Argentina 2025; Miss Universe Argentina 2026
- Major competitions: Miss Intercontinental 2022; (Unplaced); Miss International 2025; (Unplaced); Miss Universe Argentina 2026; (1st Runner-Up); Miss Universe 2026; (TBD)

Daiana Stefani Pereyra is an Argentine beauty pageant titleholder who will represent Argentina at Miss Universe 2026 and previously competed at Miss Intercontinental 2022 and Miss International 2025.

== Early life ==
Daiana Pereyra was born and raised in Posadas, Misiones and later moved to Santa Rosa de Calamuchita, Córdoba, at the age of five.

== Pageantry ==
Pereyra competed in Miss Intercontinental 2022 in Egypt but was unplaced. In 2025, she competed in Miss International 2025 in Japan and was unplaced.

In 2026, she competed in Miss Argentina, where she was the first runner-up. However, after the original titleholder stepped down, Pereyra assumed the right to represent Argentina at Miss Universe 2026 in San Juan, Puerto Rico.

Awards and achievements
Preceded by Aldana Masset	Miss Universe Argentina; 2026	Incumbent
Preceded by Agostina Galfré	Miss International Argentina; 2025	Incumbent
Preceded by Antonella Túa	Miss Intercontinental Argentina; 2022	Succeeded by Xiomara Menna
