= Maruschka Sahiboe =

Dutch–Surinamese beauty pageant titleholder

- Born: Amsterdam, Netherlands
- Beauty pageant titleholder
- Title: Miss Universe Suriname 2026
- Major competitions: Miss World Netherlands 2019; (Unplaced); Miss Universe Netherlands 2024; (1st Runner-Up); Miss Universe 2026; (TBD)

Maruschka Sahiboe is a Dutch–Surinamese beauty pageant titleholder who was appointed Miss Universe Suriname 2026. She will represent Suriname at Miss Universe 2026 in San Juan, Puerto Rico.

== Early life ==
Maruschka Sahiboe was born in Amsterdam to Surinamese-Hindustani parents and raised in Osdorp.

== Pageantry ==
Sahiboe was set to compete in Miss Nederland 2018 but later withdrew due to the age limit. She competed in Miss World Netherlands 2019 but was unplaced.

She represented Noord-Holland at Miss Universe Netherlands 2024, where she was the first runner-up. She was later set to compete in Miss Universe India 2025; however, she withdrew from the competition.

In 2026, she was appointed Miss Universe Suriname 2026 and will represent Suriname at Miss Universe 2026 in San Juan, Puerto Rico.

Awards and achievements
| Preceded by Pooja Chotkan | Miss Universe Suriname; 2026 | Incumbent |
