= Danielle Adewusi =

Nigerian beauty pageant titleholder

- Born: Lagos, Nigeria
- Education: King's College London
- Beauty pageant titleholder
- Title: Miss Universe Nigeria 2026
- Major competitions: Miss Universe Great Britain 2023; (Top 5); Miss Universe Nigeria 2026; (Winner); Miss Universe 2026; (TBD)

Danielle Adewusi is a Nigerian medical doctor and beauty pageant titleholder who won Miss Universe Nigeria 2026. She will represent Nigeria at Miss Universe 2026.

== Early life and education ==
Danielle Adewusi was born in Lagos, Nigeria. She is the daughter of Tonia Okogbenin, who represented Nigeria at Miss Universe 1991. She graduated in medicine from King's College London, where she earned an MBBS and a first-class BSc in Psychology.

She is the founder of the Scrub the Stigma initiative, a women's health organization focused on education and advocacy in Nigeria and the United Kingdom.

== Pageantry ==
In 2023, Adewusi competed at Miss Universe Great Britain 2023, where she placed in the top five.

In 2026, she represented Lagos State and won Miss Universe Nigeria 2026 at Balmoral Hall, Federal Palace Hotel, Victoria Island, Lagos. She will represent Nigeria at Miss Universe 2026 in Miss Universe 2026 in San Juan, Puerto Rico.

Awards and achievements
| Preceded by Onyinyechi Basil | Miss Universe Nigeria; 2026 | Incumbent |
