= Yemi Fawaz =

Nigerian fashion model (died 2019)

Florence Ibiyemi 'Yemi' Fawaz
- Born: 8 January 1955
- Died: 20 February 2019 (aged 64); New York, New York, U.S.
- Occupation: Fashion model
- Years active: 1978-1990

Florence Ibiyemi 'Yemi' Fawaz (January 8, 1955 - February 20, 2019) was a Nigerian fashion model, best known as the first Nigerian international supermodel with a career spanning over a decade. One of the pioneers of professional modelling in Nigeria, Fawaz was also a fashion designer, beauty promoter/consultant, actress, trade show organiser, chef, restaurateur, and deacon.

== Early life and education ==
Fawaz was born on 8 January 1955 in Nigeria, she was Yoruba, and raised by her grandmother. In 1983, she competed in Miss Universe Nigeria 1984 and placed third. She left Nigeria for US in 1997. She came back to Nigeria in 2016 at 61 to continue modelling and to coordinate fashion shows.

== Career ==
Fawaz is considered the first Nigerian supermodel. At a point in her life, she became an ardent Christian and was ordained a Deaconess in her church. She then was addressed as Deaconess Yemi Fawaz.

== Achievements ==
Fawaz opened the first modeling school and professional modeling agency in Nigeria and in West Africa. She initiated and established a non-governmental organization (NGO) with the name Banner of Love which has the goals of providing medicare as well as eradicate poverty among the underprivileged.

== Death ==
Fawaz died at the New York Lenox Hill Hospital in United States of America after battling for colon cancer for years. She was 64 years old.
