= Melissa Nayimuli =

South African model

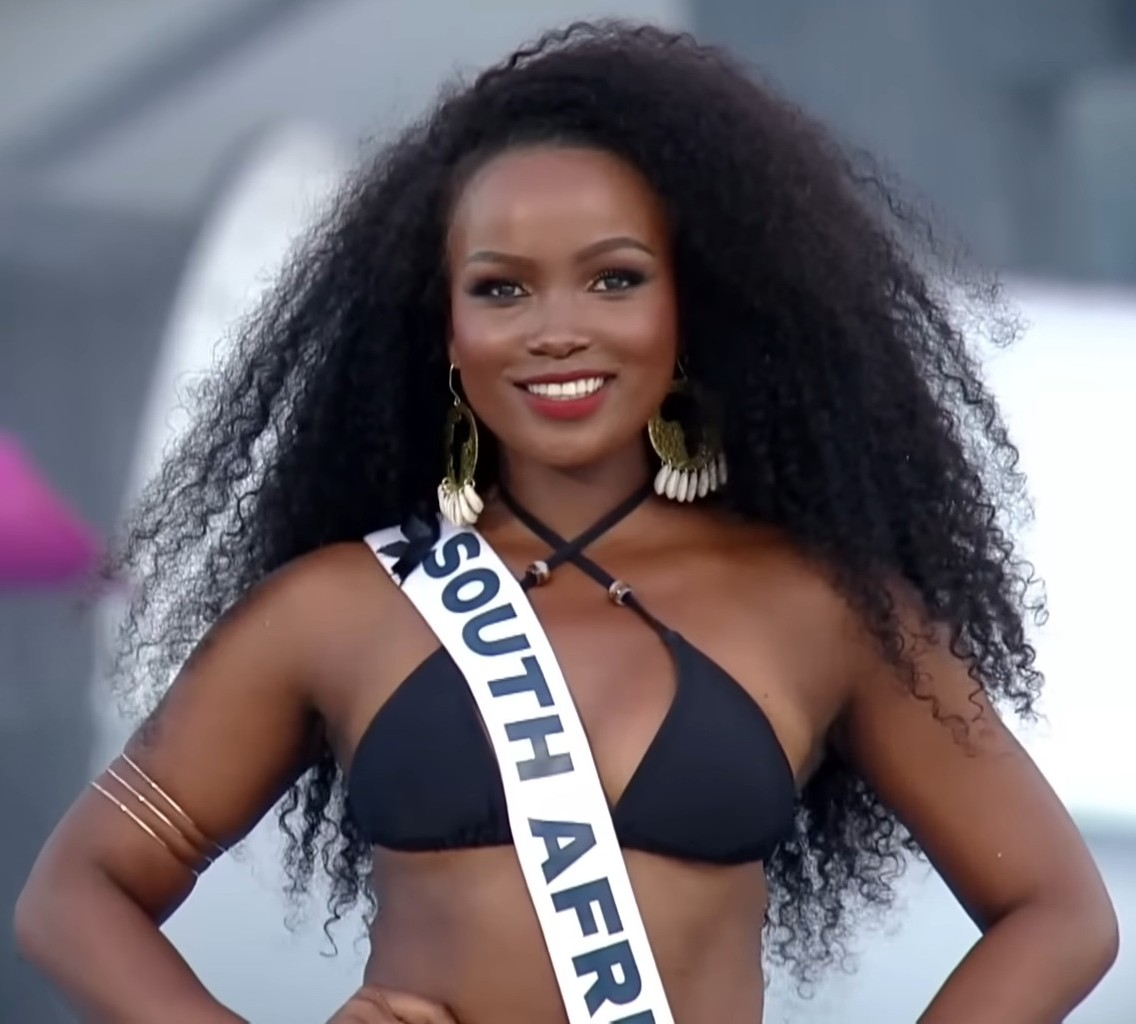
- Nayimuli at Miss Universe 2025
- Born: 2 January 1996 (age 30); Butterworth Eastern Cape, South Africa
- Occupations: Television and film creative; Model; Voice artist; Storyteller
- Beauty pageant titleholder
- Title: Miss Universe South Africa 2025
- Years active: 2020–present
- Major competitions: Miss South Africa 2020; (Top 5); Miss South Africa 2023; (Top 5); Miss Universe 2025; (Unplaced)

Melissa Nayimuli (born 2 January 1996) is a South African beauty pageant titleholder, producer, voice artist and storyteller. In October 2025, she was officially crowned Miss Universe South Africa 2025 and represented South Africa at the Miss Universe 2025 pageant in Thailand.

== Life and career ==
Nayimuli was born in Butterworth, into a multicultural home as her mother is Xhosa and her father Ugandan. She has publicly recounted experiencing xenophobic treatment in South Africa and stated her advocacy focus is on unity and inclusivity across the African continent.

Following training in television and film production, Nayimuli has worked in South Africa's creative sector as a producer, model and voice-artist.

=== Pageantry ===
Nayimuli competed in the Miss South Africa 2020 competition and placed in the top five. She was a Top 5 finalist in the Miss South Africa 2023 contest. On 22 October 2025, she was announced as the winner of the national crown of Miss Universe South Africa 2025 via the organisation African Beauty International, and represented South Africa at the international Miss Universe 2025 pageant in Thailand.

== Personal life ==
On 7 December 2025, Nayimuli announced her engagement to film producer Mandla N. The engagement took place while she was in Thailand for Miss Universe events.

== Advocacy and platform ==
Nayimuli's public messaging has been themes of hope, unity, inclusivity and transformation. In her own words, she aims to "start conversations that are aimed at repairing the damage caused by xenophobia, not only in South Africa but all over the African continent".

Awards and achievements
Preceded by Mia le Roux	Miss Universe South Africa; 2025	Succeeded by Bajabulise Thela
