= Bryoni Govender =

South African beauty pageant titleholder (born 1996)

- Born: Bryoni Natalie Govender; Kempton Park, South Africa
- Occupation: Lawyer
- Height: 1.75 m (5 ft 9 in)
- Beauty pageant titleholder
- Title: Miss Universe South Africa 2023; Miss Supranational South Africa 2024; Miss Supranational Africa 2024
- Major competitions: Miss Gauteng 2015; (Winner); Miss South Africa 2018; (Top 12); Miss South Africa 2023; (1st Runner-Up); Miss Universe 2023; (Top 20); Miss Supranational 2024; (Top 12); (People’s Choice); (Miss Supranational Africa)

Bryoni Natalie Govender (born 17 July 1996) is a South African beauty pageant titleholder and lawyer who won Miss Universe South Africa 2023 and Miss Supranational South Africa 2024.

She was appointed Miss Supranational South Africa 2024 and Miss Universe South Africa 2023 after finishing as the first-runner-up at the Miss South Africa 2023. Govender represented South Africa at Miss Universe 2023, and reached the top 20. At Miss Supranational 2024 she reached the top 12, and won the People’s Choice award and the title of Miss Supranational Africa 2024.

== Background ==
Govender was born to parents of South African Indian descent in Kempton Park, Gauteng. She is a qualified lawyer who is working as a trainee associate, whilst awaiting admission to become an attorney.

== Pageantry ==
=== Miss Universe 2023 ===
In August 2023, Govender finished as the first runner-up at the Miss South Africa 2023. She will be the first South African of Indian descent to represent South Africa at Miss Universe since 1998. It has been 25 years since South Africa had an Indian representative at the Miss Universe pageant. This after Miss SA 1997, Kerishnie Naicker reached the top 10 at the Miss Universe pageant in 1998. She represented South Africa at Miss Universe 2023, held in El Salvador on 18 November 2023, where she reached the top 20. She also represented South Africa at Miss Supranational 2024, where she reached the top 12 through the Candidate's Choice and won the title Miss Supranational Africa 2024. This made her the first South African of Indian descent to compete.

== Personal life ==
Govender works as an admitted attorney and currently, she is dating former Kaizer Chief striker Samir Nurković.

Awards and achievements
Preceded by Ndavi Nokeri	Miss Universe South Africa; 2023	Succeeded by Mia le Roux
Preceded by Ayanda Gugulethu Thabethe	Miss Supranational South Africa; 2024	Succeeded by Lebohang Raputsoe
Preceded by (Zimbabwe) Sakhile Zibusiso Dube	Miss Supranational Africa; 2024	Succeeded by (Zambia) NaMakau Nawa
