= Angel Bhathal =

Guyanese beauty pageant titleholder

- Angel Bhathal
- Born: Angel Bhathal
- Education: University of Manitoba; University of Alberta
- Beauty pageant titleholder
- Title: Miss Cappadocia International 2022; Miss Universe Guyana 2026
- Major competitions: Miss Cappadocia International 2022; (Winner); Miss Universe India 2024; (Top 20); MGI All Stars 1st Edition; (Unplaced); Miss Universe 2026; (TBD)

Angel Bhathal is a Canadian and Guyanese pharmacist and beauty pageant titleholder. She will represent Guyana at Miss Universe 2026 in San Juan, Puerto Rico.

== Early life and education ==
Bhathal is a first-generation Indian Canadian and grew up in Winnipeg, Manitoba province. She is of Guyanese descent. Her great-grandmother was an Indian migrant worker.

Bhathal completed her undergraduate studies at the University of Manitoba, earning a Bachelor of Pharmacy degree. She subsequently pursued postgraduate studies at the University of Alberta, where she obtained a Doctor of Pharmacy (PharmD) degree.

== Pageantry ==
She later secured another international victory at the Miss Cappadocia International 2022 pageant in Turkey.

=== Miss Universe India 2024 ===
Bhathal competed in Miss Universe India 2024 as a delegate for the Indian community in Canada. She finished in the Top 20.

=== MGI All Stars 1st Edition ===
Bhathal participated in the inaugural MGI All Stars beauty pageant, held in May 2026 in Bangkok, Thailand.

=== Miss Universe 2026 ===
In October 2026, Bhathal was appointed Miss Universe Guyana 2026 and is scheduled to represent her country at Miss Universe 2026, which will be held on November 24, 2026, in San Juan, Puerto Rico.

Awards and achievements
Preceded by Chandini Baljor	Miss Universe Guyana; 2026	Incumbent
