= Justine Kamara =

French and Guinean beauty pageant titleholder

- Born: 30 November 1996 (age 29); Nancy, Meurthe-et-Moselle, France
- Height: 173 cm (5 ft 8 in)
- Beauty pageant titleholder
- Title: Miss Lorraine 2016; Miss Universe Guinea 2026
- Major competitions: Miss France 2017; (4th Runner-Up); Miss Universe 2026; (TBD)

Justine Kamara (born 30 November 1996) is a French and Guinean beauty pageant titleholder who won Miss Lorraine 2016. She will represent Guinea at Miss Universe 2026.

== Early life ==
Justine Kamara was born on 30 November 1996 in Nancy, Meurthe-et-Moselle. She is the daughter of Christel Césari, a French-Guadeloupean from Lorraine, and Joseph Kamara, a Guinean. She earned a bachelor's degree from ICN Business School in Metz.

In 2018, Kamara portrayed MHD's love interest in the music video for Bébé. In 2025, she gave birth to her first daughter.

== Pageantry ==
Kamara competed in Miss Lorraine 2015, where she was named first runner-up. She returned to the competition in 2016 and won the title of Miss Lorraine 2016, earning the opportunity to represent Lorraine at Miss France 2017, where she placed fourth runner-up.

In 2026, Kamara was selected as Miss Universe Guinea 2026. She will represent Guinea at Miss Universe 2026, which is scheduled to be held in November 2026 in San Juan, Puerto Rico.

Awards and achievements
Preceded by Tiguidanké Bérété	Miss Universe Guinea; 2026	Incumbent
Preceded by Jessica Molle	Miss Lorraine; 2016	Succeeded by Cloé Cirelli
