= Luren Márquez =

Peruvian beauty pageant titleholder

- Born: Ica, Peru
- Education: Florida International University; University of Lima
- Beauty pageant titleholder
- Title: Miss Teen International 2018; Miss Universe Peru 2026
- Major competitions: Miss Teen Peru 2018; (Winner); Miss Teen International; (Winner); Miss Peru 2024; (1st Runner-Up); Miss Universe 2026; (TBD)

Luren Márquez is a Peruvian tv host, model and beauty pageant titleholder. She will represent Peru at Miss Universe 2026 in San Juan, Puerto Rico.

== Early life and career ==
Luren Márquez was born in Ica, Peru. She holds a bachelor's degree in Business Administration from the University of Lima and a bachelor's degree in communication, with a specialization in Digital Marketing, from Florida International University.

In 2018, she won Miss Teen Peru and later won the Miss Teen International title.

Márquez has worked as a television presenter for networks including Univision and Telemundo. She has also modeled for several international designers and brands, including Ágatha Ruiz de la Prada, Custo Barcelona, Walter Méndez, and Gianina Azar.

Márquez had an international modelling career prior to her participation in pageants, having appeared at fashion weeks in Los Angeles, New York, and Miami.

== Pageantry ==
=== Miss Peru ===
Márquez represented Miss Peru USA 2024 and was first runner-up at Miss Peru 2024. On 15 April 2026, Márquez was appointed Miss Universe Peru 2026 by the Miss Peru organization, and will represent Peru at Miss Universe 2026, to be held in November 2026 in San Juan, Puerto Rico.

Awards and achievements
Preceded by Karla Bacigalupo	Miss Universe Peru; 2026	Incumbent
Preceded by Camila Escribens	Miss Peru USA; 2024	Succeeded by Karla Bacigalupo
