= Olivia Vasilopoulos =

Greek models

- Born: Olivia Vasilopoulos; December 11, 2000 (age 25); Sydney, Australia
- Education: University of Melbourne
- Beauty pageant titleholder
- Title: Miss Universe Greece 2026
- Major competitions: Star GS Hellas 2026; (Miss Universe Greece 2026); Miss Universe 2026; (TBD)

Olivia Vasilopoulos (Greek: Ολίβια Βασιλόπουλος; born December 15, 2000) is a Greek-Australian model, entrepreneur and beauty pageant titleholder who won the title of Miss Universe Greece 2026 and will represent Greece at Miss Universe 2026.

== Early life and education ==
Olivia Vasilopoulos was born in Sydney, Australia on December 11, 2000, to parents of Greek descent; her father is from the Mytilene region and her mother is from Argos. She grew up in a multicultural environment, spending her life in Hong Kong and Melbourne before eventually migrating to Greece with her family. Vasilopoulos is fluent in five languages: Greek, English, Cantonese, Mandarin, and German.

She holds a degree in political science from the University of Melbourne, Australia.

== Pageantry ==
=== Star GS Hellas 2026 ===
Vasilopoulos competed in the Star GS Hellas 2026 pageant and won the title of Miss Universe Greece 2026.

=== Miss Universe 2026 ===
Following her victory, she will represent Greece at the Miss Universe 2026, which will be held at the José Miguel Agrelot Coliseum in San Juan, Puerto Rico.

Awards and achievements
Preceded by Mary Chatzipavlou	Miss Universe Greece; 2026	Incumbent
