= African Beauty International =

Beauty pageants in South Africa

African Beauty International Organization (ABI)
- Established: 2025; 1 year ago
- Founder: Bokang Montjane
- Merger of: Miss World South Africa; Miss Universe South Africa
- Type: Beauty pageant
- Headquarters: Johannesburg
- Location: South Africa
- Official language: English
- Owner: Bokang Montjane
- Affiliations: Miss World; Miss Universe

African Beauty International (ABI) is a South African organization that organizes a national beauty pageant and selects South Africa's representatives for international beauty pageants.

The reigning titleholders under ABI include Miss World South Africa 2026 Romanda Hombir, who participated in and won the Miss World Africa title at Miss World 2026 in Vietnam; Miss Universe South Africa 2026 Bajabulise Thela, who will represent South Africa at Miss Universe 2026 in Puerto Rico; and Miss Supranational South Africa 2026 Shannon Benting, who represented South Africa at Miss Supranational 2026 in Poland.

== History ==
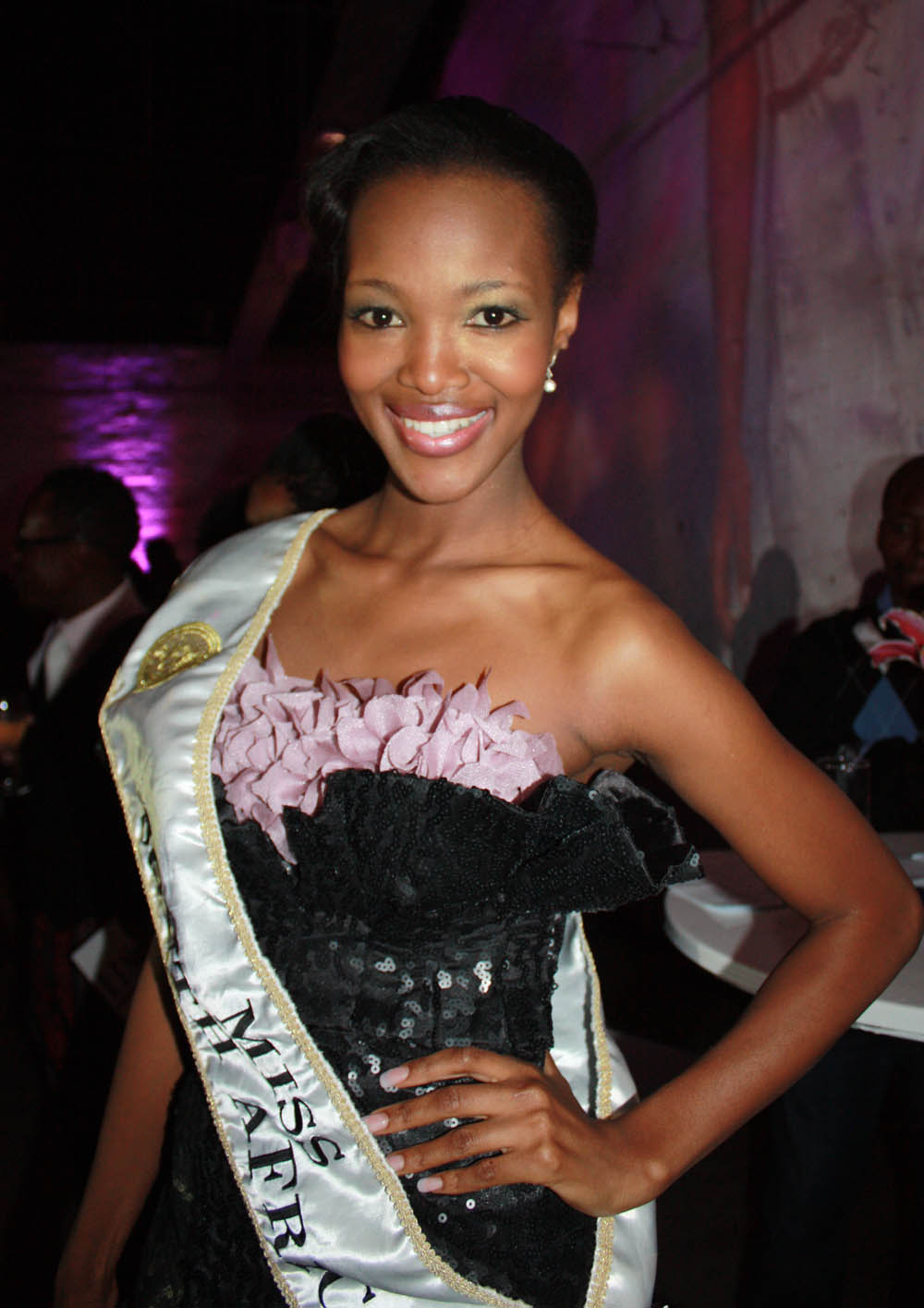
Bokang Montjane, founder of African Beauty International

African Beauty International was established by Bokang Montjane. The company has held the licenses to select South Africa's representatives for Miss Supranational and Miss Universe since 2025.

In June 2026, the organization acquired the Miss World license, enabling it to send a representative to Miss World 2026. In September 2026, the Miss Supranational franchise was transferred to Joani Jacobs, CEO of Mrs. South Africa.

=== Miss African Beauty South Africa ===
Bokang Montjane founded African Beauty International (ABI), which appointed South Africa's representatives to Miss Supranational 2025 and Miss Universe 2025. In 2026, the organization launched the inaugural Miss African Beauty South Africa pageant to select the country's representatives for Miss Supranational, Miss World, and Miss Universe.

== Titleholders ==
Year	Miss World South Africa	Miss Universe South Africa	Miss Supranational South Africa
2025	—N/a	Melissa Nayimuli	Lebohang Raputsoe
2026	Romanda Hombir	Bajabulise Thela	Shannon Benting
2027	TBA	TBA	—N/a

=== Winners by province ===
The following is a list of winners of titles awarded through competitions held under the African Beauty International edition since its inception in 2026.

Province	Title	Miss World South Africa	Miss Universe South Africa	Miss Supranational South Africa
Gauteng	1	—N/a	—N/a	1 (2026)
Mpumalanga	2	1 (2026)	1 (2026)	—N/a

=== Gallery of Titleholders ===
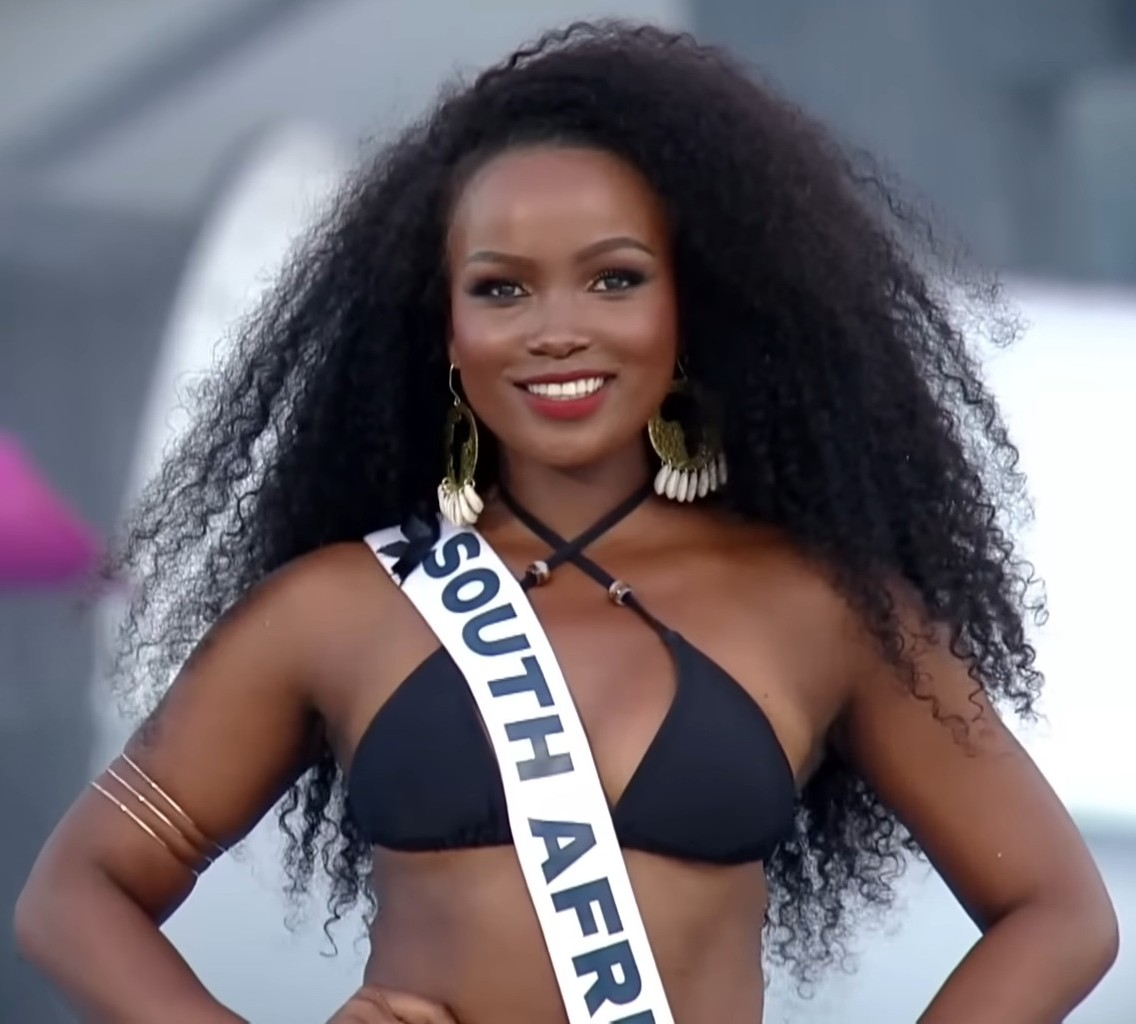
Melissa Nayimuli, Miss Universe South Africa 2025

== Editions ==
=== Miss World South Africa 2027 ===
Miss World South Africa 2027 is organized by African Beauty International. Applications opened in September 2026 and will close on 26 October 2026.

The requirements for Miss World South Africa 2027 are:

- Be South African citizens.
- Be between 18 and 26 years old.
- Have a matric certificate or higher education qualification.
- Be unmarried and not mothers.
- Meet the organisation's stated eligibility requirements.
- Have no visible tattoos.
- Submit a copy of their South African ID and highest qualification.
- Submit two photographs — one head-and-shoulders image and one full-length photograph.

=== Miss African Beauty South Africa 2026 ===
Miss African Beauty South Africa 2026 is the inaugural edition of the Miss African Beauty South Africa pageant, organized by African Beauty International (ABI). The pageant serves as the national selection platform for South Africa's representatives to international competitions, including Miss World, Miss Universe, and Miss Supranational.

A total of 29 contestants competed for the Miss African Beauty Supranational 2026 title on 6 June 2026 at Times Square in Pretoria. The remaining national titles will be awarded at separate events featuring 20 contestants; however, following the withdrawal of five contestants, only 16 contestants competed. The remaining 16 contestants competed on 18 July 2026 at the Barnyard Theatre Menlyn in Pretoria. Of these, nine competed for the Miss African Beauty Universe South Africa 2026 title, while the other seven competed for the Miss World South Africa 2026 title.

Shannon Benting of Gauteng won the Miss African Beauty Supranational 2026 title, while Romanda Hombir of Mpumalanga and Whitney du Bruyn of Gauteng placed among the Top 3 finalists. Romanda Hombir and Bajabulise Thela, both representing Mpumalanga, later won the Miss World South Africa 2026 and Miss African Beauty Universe 2026 titles, respectively.

==== Results ====
- : Declared as Winner
- : Ended as a runner-up

Province	Contestant	Age (Note: Ages at the time of the pageant)	Award	Ref.
Competed for Miss World South Africa 2026
Eastern Cape	Bongisisiwe Ndumela	26	—N/a	
Gauteng	Ashleigh Alves	26	—N/a	
Gauteng	Casey Esmeraldo	23	—N/a	
Gauteng	Dominique Manuell	23	—N/a	
Gauteng	Ontshiametse Tlhopane	25	—N/a	
Mpumalanga	Romanda Hombir	27	Miss World South Africa 2026	
North West	Tlotlego Molefe	26	—N/a	
Competed for Miss African Beauty Universe 2026
Gauteng	Annedernive Brown	29	—N/a	
Gauteng	Stacey-Lee April	27	—N/a	
Gauteng	Tshiamo Mobe (Note: Tshiamo Mobe did not place among the Top 20 finalists; she only competed in Miss African Beauty Supranational 2026. She was later added to the lineup of Miss African Beauty Universe 2026 contestants for the remaining national title competition following the withdrawal of several contestants.)	28	—N/a	
Gauteng	Tiziana Devipursad	32	—N/a	
Gauteng	Whitney du Bruyn	32	2nd Runner-Up	
Gauteng	Zamokuhle Vilakazi	27	1st Runner-Up	
Limpopo	Charlotte Mogotlane	29	—N/a	
Limpopo	Joretha Mafane	29	—N/a	
Mpumalanga	Bajabulise Thela	23	Miss Universe South Africa 2026	
Withdrew from Miss African Beauty World 2026 and Miss African Beauty Universe 2026
Eastern Cape	Musa Daweti	21	Did not compete	
Gauteng	Jessica Nel	26	Did not compete	
Limpopo	Londotani Mudau	23	Did not compete	
Western Cape	Jesmika Singh	26	Did not compete	
Western Cape	Joey Roman	22	Did not compete	
Competed for Miss African Beauty Supranational 2026
Gauteng	Luyanda Mkhize	25	—N/a	
Gauteng	Ofentse Mogale	24	Did not compete	
Gauteng	Ria Malatji	26	—N/a	
Gauteng	Shannon Benting	30	Miss Supranational South Africa 2026	
KwaZulu-Natal	Oluhle Mthethwa	22	—N/a	
KwaZulu-Natal	Yolanda Skibi	24	—N/a	
KwaZulu-Natal	Zukiswa Majola	24	—N/a	
Limpopo	Molemo Maimela	24	—N/a	
Mpumalanga	Michelle Kruger	30	—N/a	

== International placements ==
Current Franchise
Title	Year
Miss Universe	2025–present
Miss World	2026–present
Former Franchise
Titles	Year
Miss Supranational	2025–2026

=== Current franchise ===
==== Miss World ====
- : Ended as top 6 qualification

Year	Province	Miss World South Africa	Placement	Special award	Note	Ref.
2026	Mpumalanga	Romanda Hombir	Top 6	3 Special Awards: Miss World Africa; Winner – Miss World Head-to-Head (Queen of Africa from 4 continentals); Top 21 – Miss World Top Model		

==== Miss Universe ====
Year	Province	Miss Universe South Africa	Placement	Special award	Note	Ref.
2026	Mpumalanga	Bajabulise Thela				
2025	Eastern Cape	Melissa Nayimuli	Unplaced			

=== Former franchise ===
==== Miss Supranational ====
- : Ended as one of the Semi-finalists

Year	Province	Miss Supranational South Africa	Placement	Special award	Note	Ref.
2026	Gauteng	Shannon Benting	Unplaced	1 Special Awards: Top 20 – Supra Influencer		
2025	Gauteng	Lebohang Raputsoe	Top 24	1 Special Awards: Top 10 – Supra Model of the Year		

== See also ==
- Miss South Africa
- Big Four beauty pageants
- List of beauty pageants
