= Miss Universe 2026 =

75th Miss Universe beauty pageant

- Date: 24 November 2026
- Presenters: R'Bonney Gabriel; Mario Lopez; Zuri Hall; Dayanara Torres
- Venue: José Miguel Agrelot Coliseum, San Juan, Puerto Rico
- Broadcaster: Television: Reelz; Roku; Telemundo; TV Azteca; Streaming: Peacock
- Entrants: 116
- Placements: 30
- Debuts: Saint Martin; Uganda
- Withdrawals: Angola; Bulgaria; Côte d'Ivoire; Indonesia; Laos; Malaysia; Mauritius; Miss Universe Latina; Nepal; Palestine; Rwanda; Senegal; Singapore; Slovenia; Thailand; Turkey; United Arab Emirates; Vietnam; Zambia; Zimbabwe
- Returns: Albania; Cameroon; Ethiopia; Germany; Iceland; Jamaica; Jordan; Kenya; Lithuania; Mongolia; Montenegro; Réunion; Sierra Leone; Suriname; Tunisia; Uzbekistan

Miss Universe 2026 will be the 75th Miss Universe pageant, scheduled to be held at the José Miguel Agrelot Coliseum in San Juan, Puerto Rico, on 24 November 2026. The event will be presented by R'Bonney Gabriel, Mario Lopez, Zuri Hall, and Dayanara Torres.

Fátima Bosch of Mexico will crown her successor at the end of the event. Contestants from 116 countries and territories are competing in the pageant.

== Location and date ==
=== Announcement ===
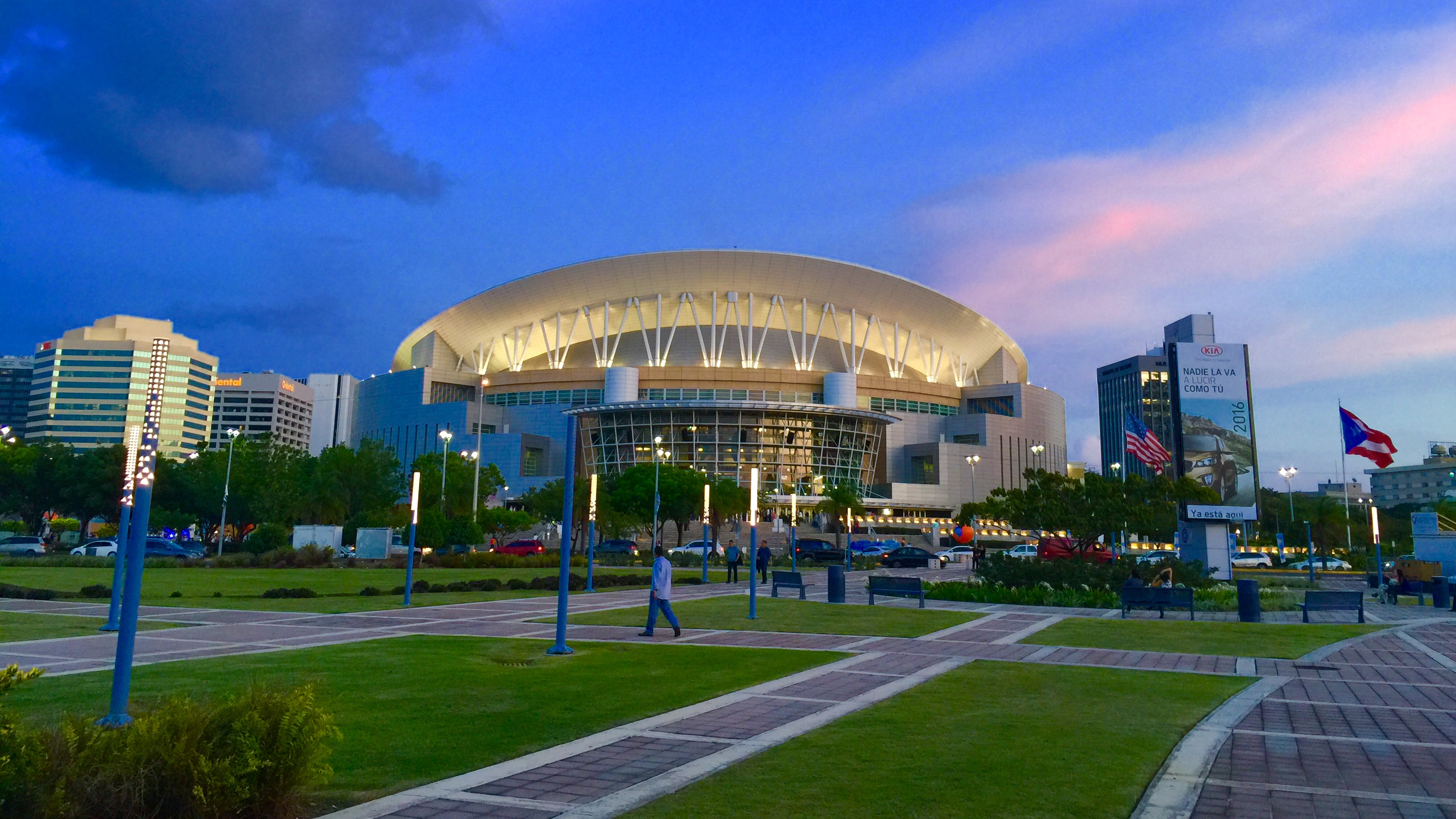
José Miguel Agrelot Coliseum, venue of the pageant

On 23 September 2025, the Miss Universe Organization announced that the 75th edition of the pageant will be held in the United States territory of Puerto Rico, marking its fourth hosting of the pageant, after 1972, 2001, and 2002. Jenniffer González-Colón, the governor of Puerto Rico, confirmed the selection and announced that her administration had agreed to allocate a total of $9 million in public funds to finance its hosting of the competition, which would be handled by the Puerto Rico Tourism Company and Discover Puerto Rico.

=== Negotiations ===
On 18 December, Willianette Robles Cancel, the executive director of the Puerto Rico Tourism Company, suspended its disbursements to Miss Universe and called for a meeting between their contingents to discuss "several pending issues and new requirements for holding the pageant". The suspension came after the pageant faced a number of issues, including irregularities in the outcome of the previous edition and the Mexican government launching an investigation on Miss Universe president Raúl Rocha on drugs, fuel, and arms trafficking charges. By March 2026, the contingents had reached an agreement to continue organizing the pageant in the territory. Among the conditions imposed by the Puerto Rican government in the agreement was for Rocha to withdraw his involvement in organizing the edition to "safeguard Puerto Rico's image". By April 2026, the Puerto Rican government completed its disbursements to Miss Universe.

=== Venues and schedule ===
The organizers designated the José Miguel Agrelot Coliseum in San Juan, Puerto Rico, as the venue for the preliminary and final rounds of the pageant. On 22 July, the organizers announced the schedule for the contests, setting the national costume show for 21 November and the preliminary competition for the day after. The finals are set to take place on 24 November, hours before the finals of Miss International 2026; the Philippine Daily Inquirer reported that this scheduling marks the first time the coronation shows of two Big Four beauty pageants are held within hours of each other.

== Selection of participants ==
Contestants from 116 countries and territories were selected to compete in the contest. Among the delegates, five were appointed to compete as the runner-up in their national pageant, (Note: Aliya Karotkaya of Belarus was the first runner-up in Miss Belarus 2025. Dabilo Moses of Botswana was the first runner-up in Miss Universe Botswana 2025. Danielle Yablonka of Israel was the first runner-up in Miss Universe Israel 2025. Bruk Belete of Ethiopia was the first runner-up in Miss Universe Spain 2026. Selena Grant of Turks and Caicos Islands was the first runner-up in Miss Universe Turks and Caicos 2025.) twenty-two were chosen through a casting process, (Note: Representatives from Armenia, Aruba, Bangladesh, the British Virgin Islands, Egypt, Guyana, Iraq, Jordan, Latvia, Lithuania, Macau, Martinique, Mayotte, Moldova, Nicaragua, Paraguay, Peru, Poland, Russia, Trinidad and Tobago, Uruguay and Uzbekistan, were each selected through a casting process conducted by their respective organizations.) while nine were selected to replace an original winner.

Multiple franchise holders have forgone holding a pageant for the edition. On 28 May 2026, Miss France withdrew from the Miss Universe Organization, citing the controversies surrounding the previous edition. As a result, the winner of their 2025 edition, Angélique Angarni-Filopon, will not proceed to Miss Universe. The following day, Miss Universe announced that it will directly organize the French qualifier pageant beginning with the 2026 edition, which named Garance Authié as the new French representative. The license holders in Turks and Caicos Islands and Trinidad and Tobago are also not organizing pageants for this edition.

=== Franchise ownership dispute ===
In September 2026, the JKN Global Group disputed the validity of franchise agreements held by Miss Universe Eastern, a company owned by Thai businessman Nawat Itsaragrisil that holds six Southeast Asian franchises: Indonesia, Laos, Malaysia, Singapore, Thailand, and Vietnam. While the announcement called into question the eligibility of contestants selected under these franchises, Itsaragrisil maintained that the agreements remained valid and that his selected contestants would travel to Puerto Rico for the competition. In response, Miss Universe CEO Ronald Day stated that the existing restrictions affecting the six franchises would remain in effect until the end of the competition. He emphasized that the organizing team in Puerto Rico retained final decision-making authority over all matters concerning the pageant. However, Day declined to specify how the organization would respond if contestants selected by the disputed franchises attempted to participate in the competition.

On 21 October, Itsaragrisil announced through the channels of Miss Grand International PCL that none of the franchises under his organization will be sending delegates to the 2026 edition.

=== Replacements ===
Xinying Zhu of China withdrew due to age restrictions and was replaced by Weiyi Chen, who was later replaced by Shiqi Wang for undisclosed reasons. Anara Esengeldieva of Kyrgyzstan was replaced by Medina Ermekova for undisclosed reasons. Eunike Lioe of Suriname was replaced by Maruschka Sahiboe following a change in the license holder. Matôma Condé of Guinea was replaced by Justine Kamara after being sent to compete at Miss Cosmo 2026. Tamara Rogouski of Argentina withdrew for personal reasons and was replaced by her first runner-up, Daiana Pereyra. Sophia Osako of the Czech Republic withdrew to focus on her other duties and was replaced by her first runner-up, Dominika Kotoučková. Enkhdelgerekh Enkhbold of Mongolia was replaced by her first runner-up, Namuunaa Otgonbaatar. Marian Madly of the Collectivity of Saint Martin was replaced by Elle Duncan.

=== Debuts, returns and withdrawals ===
This edition will mark the debuts of the Collectivity of Saint Martin and Uganda. Returning countries and territories for this edition included Jordan, which last competed in 1960; Tunisia in 1971; Réunion in 1986; Ethiopia in 2017; Lithuania and Sierra Leone in 2019; Albania, Cameroon, Germany, Iceland, Jamaica, Kenya, Mongolia, Montenegro, Suriname, and Uzbekistan in 2024.

Four of the six disputed Itsaragrisil-owned franchises had selected candidates before their blanket withdrawal: Eunice Wong of Malaysia, Vion Tan of Singapore, Tharina Botes of Thailand, and Quỳnh Anh Nguyễn of Vietnam. Indonesia and Laos had yet to select delegates before their exclusion from the competition.

Anna Babau of Bulgaria withdrew from the competition following a car accident. Wanderléia Rodrigues of Angola, Prayashna Gurung of Nepal, Mubanga Hatyoka of Zambia, and Roseanna Hall of Zimbabwe, withdrew due to travel restrictions. Alara Erıç of Turkey withdrew for undisclosed reasons. The national organizations of Côte d'Ivoire, Mauritius, Miss Universe Latina, Palestine, Rwanda, Senegal, Slovenia, and the United Arab Emirates, all failed to appoint a delagate or hold a national competition.

=== Did not compete ===
Victoria Amerson of Austria withdrew from the competition for personal reasons, while Aminath Yuin Mohamed of the Maldives, Sara Allali of Morocco, Zoulahatou Amadou of Niger, and Katia Doneva of North Macedonia, withdrew for undisclosed reasons. Georgina Kambongo of the Republic of the Congo and Amylia Deng of South Sudan, withdrew due to visa restrictions. Thandi Chisi of Malawi withdrew due to financial and organizational issues.

== Pageant ==
=== Format ===
On 16 October 2026, Miss Universe opened public voting for a place among the Top 30, as well as special awards for Best Evening Gown, Best Swimsuit, and Best National Costume.

=== New crown ===
As part of commemorations for the contest's 75th anniversary, Miss Universe introduced the "Radiance of an Eternal Legacy" crown on 12 November, replacing the Jewelmer "Lumière de l'Infini" crown. The 13th crown used in the history of the pageant, it was designed by George Wittels, the jeweler for Miss Venezuela, in collaboration with Paris-based jewerly house Maison d'Or.

=== Broadcast ===
The pageant will be broadcast in part or in its entirety on Reelz, Telemundo, Roku, and TV Azteca. The program was also made available for streaming on Peacock. American designer and Miss Universe 2022 R'Bonney Gabriel and American actor and television host Mario Lopez will serve as a presenter, with Zuri Hall and Miss Universe 1993 Dayanara Torres providing commentary for the event. Miss Universe 2001 Denise Quiñones will host the preliminary competition, while Miss Universe 2006 Zuleyka Rivera will host the national costume show. They are joined by media personality Jai Rodriguez on each show.

== Contestants ==
The confirmed contestants are as follows:

Country/Territory	Contestant	Age (Note: Ages at the time of the pageant)	Hometown	Ref.
Albania	Jogersa Beqiri	25	Shkodër	
Argentina	Daiana Pereyra	28	Posadas	
Armenia	Arena Zeynalian	33	Tehran	
Aruba	Elizabeth Johnson	24	Oranjestad	
Australia	Caitlin Worthington	29	Brisbane	
Bahamas	Shawndra Henfield	24	Exuma	
Bangladesh	Samira Khan Mahi	29	Sylhet	
Belarus	Aliya Karotkaya	22	Minsk	
Belgium	Olga Lombardo	23	Leuven	
Belize	Caleigh-Rose West	24	Belize City	
Bolivia	Valeria Mena	24	Oruro	
Bonaire	Caroline Porras	25	Antriol	
Botswana	Dabilo Moses	26	Gaborone	
Brazil	Marcella Kozinski	26	Curitiba	
British Virgin Islands	Orealia Thomas	42	Saint Thomas	
Cambodia	Rthna Than	19	Phnom Penh	
Cameroon	Audrey Black	30	Douala	
Canada	Aslihan Morali	30	Ancaster	
Cape Verde	Armandina Cunha	27	Mindelo	
Cayman Islands	Juliana Myers	21	West Bay	
Chile	Dominga López	25	Viña del Mar	
China	Shiqi Wang	25	Shanghai	
Colombia	María Alejandra López	32	Pereira	
Costa Rica	Mariale Acosta	25	Alajuela	
Croatia	Antea Mršić	25	Zagreb	
Cuba	Mia Dio	25	Doral	
Curaçao	Bianty Gomperts	28	Amerikanenkamp	
Czech Republic	Dominika Kotoučková	25	Prague	
Democratic Republic of the Congo	Jessi Kalambayi	28	Kinshasa	
Denmark	Fie Rose Lindegaard	27	Copenhagen	
Dominican Republic	Melissa Núñez	29	La Vega	
Ecuador	Dalia Bucaram	21	Guayaquil	
Egypt	Sonia Gergis	32	Cairo	
El Salvador	Sofía Córdova	27	San Salvador	
Equatorial Guinea	Isabel Mbomio	24	Evinayong	
Estonia	Emili Denneng	21	Pärnu	
Ethiopia	Bruk Belete	24	Addis Ababa	
Finland	Veera Grönlund	30	Pori	
France	Garance Authié	22	Paris	
Germany	Celina Weil	25	Rockenberg	
Ghana	Belvy Ofori	33	Accra	
Great Britain	Angela Aumonier	25	Douglas	
Greece	Olivia Vasilopoulos	25	Mytilene	
Guadeloupe	Chloé Deher	31	Terre-de-Haut	
Guatemala	Adelina Castillo	30	Sacatepéquez	
Guinea	Justine Kamara	29	Nancy	
Guyana	Angel Bhathal	40	Toronto	
Haiti	Tatenda Rameau	28	Syracuse	
Honduras	Luisa Pineda	26	Río Lindo	
Hong Kong	Jennifer Zhou	27	Hong Kong	
Hungary	Kamilla Kiss	25	Dunaújváros	
Iceland	Sigríður Hrafnkelsdóttir	27	Garðabær	
India	Kaziah Mejo	19	Mavelikkara	
Iraq	Samantha Slewa	29	Vaughan	
Ireland	Aideen Howard	22	Castletroy	
Israel	Danielle Yablonka	25	Herzliya	
Italy	Giada Folcia	37	Monza	
Jamaica	Celene Hall	25	Portland	
Japan	Sayuki Ito	27	Fukuoka	
Jordan	Destiny Anbar	30	Cupey	
Kazakhstan	Alina Ekaterinecheva	22	Shymkent	
Kenya	Jean Ojiro	27	Nyanza	
Kosovo	Evisa Pacolli	21	Toronto	
Kyrgyzstan	Medina Ermekova	18	Bishkek	
Latvia	Lāsma Kuhtarska	31	Riga	
Lebanon	Perla Harb	23	Maamariyeh	
Lithuania	Olga Bykadorova	32	Montreal	
Macau	Xuhe Hou	24	Jilin	
Malta	Francesca Mercieca	30	St. Paul's Bay	
Martinique	Larissa Ségarel	29	Lamentin	
Mayotte	Maëva Toumbou Dani	33	Tsingoni	
Mexico	María Vargas	28	Copalita	
Moldova	Dorina Darii	32	Hîncești	
Mongolia	Namuunaa Otgonbaatar	30	Ulaanbaatar	
Montenegro	Aleksandra Ivezaj	22	Tuzi	
Myanmar	May Grace Parry	31	Hpa-an	
Namibia	Charene Labuschagne	28	Windhoek	
Netherlands	Melissa Bottema	26	Winsum	
New Zealand	Georgia Waddington	25	Christchurch	
Nicaragua	Jasmine Blandford	28	Kukra Hill	
Nigeria	Danielle Adewusi	29	Lagos	
Norway	Abelone Smedsrud	29	Eiker	
Pakistan	Misbah Arshad	29	Lahore	
Panama	Gabriela González	20	Chiriquí	
Paraguay	Gretha Matiauda	26	Asunción	
Peru	Luren Márquez	27	Ica	
Philippines	Bea Millan-Windorski	24	San Juan	
Poland	Vivica Lewandowski	21	Barrington	
Portugal	Isabela Santos	26	Gaia	
Puerto Rico	Jennifer Barreto	27	San Sebastián	
Réunion	Abigaëlle Taïlamée	20	Saint-Joseph	
Romania	Sabina Parmac	21	Bucharest	
Russia	Alexandra Stashkevich	21	Tyumen	
Saint Lucia	Bernella Velinor	34	Dennery	
Saint Martin	Elle Duncan	32	Seattle	
Serbia	Nikolina Vujčić	24	Dragovo	
Sierra Leone	Katti Fofanah	22	Bonthe	
Slovakia	Anna Ličková	25	Martin	
South Africa	Bajabulise Thela	23	KaNyamazane	
South Korea	Yurim Kim	35	Seoul	
Spain	Susana Medina	28	Telde	
Sri Lanka	Nimhara Sasindi	25	Colombo	
Suriname	Maruschka Sahiboe	34	Osdorp	
Sweden	Josefin Strand	27	Stockholm	
Switzerland	Itiya Dube	27	Geneva	
Tanzania	Elizabeth Makune	30	Mwanza	
Trinidad and Tobago	Vinita Manoo	36	San Juan	
Tunisia	Sarrah Brahmi	33	Sousse	
Turks and Caicos Islands	Selena Grant	25	Providenciales	
Uganda	Mitchelle Daka	30	Budaka	
Ukraine	Anna Nikonova	23	Kyiv	
United States	Justus Kelley	31	Arlington	
United States Virgin Islands	Jenna-Monét Queeley	29	Saint Croix	
Uruguay	Lucía Piñeyro	33	Young	
Uzbekistan	Ziedakhon Sharipova	34	Samarkand	
Venezuela	Clara Vegas	24	Chacao	
