= Bonang Matheba =

South African television personality (born 1987)

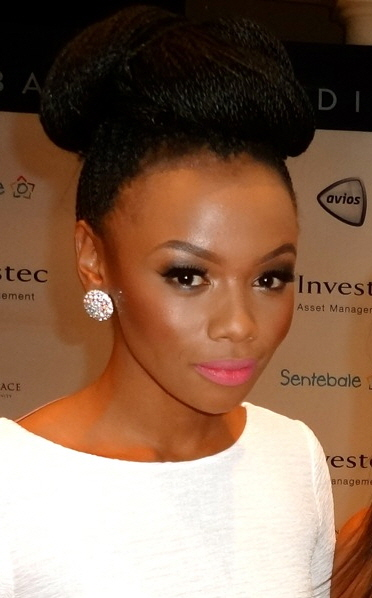
- Born: 25 June 1987 (age 39); Mahikeng, North West, South Africa
- Other names: Queen B; Your Girl B
- Education: Fourways High School
- Alma mater: University of Johannesburg
- Occupations: Television presenter; radio personality; author; entrepreneur
- Years active: 2002–present
- Website: bonangmatheba.com

Bonang Dorothy Matheba (born 25 June 1987), is a South African television presenter, radio personality, author and entrepreneur. She is known for her flamboyant presenting skills and her signature voice. She presented the SABC 1 music show LIVE (now Live Amp) which built her spotlight in the industry. In 2006 she was a hostess on a late night pay-per-call call-in game show. Participants had to call-in to guess the answer to a simple puzzle and win cash prizes.

In 2011, she became the first South African celebrity to launch an online reality show called B*Dazzled. In 2013, she was the first international ambassador for the cosmetic brand Revlon, outside the US.

In 2014, she hosted the 2014 MTV Europe Music Awards pre-show, which made her become the first South African to host the pre-ceremony. In 2015, she became the first African to be given an E! News Special Africa on E!. Matheba has over 5 million followers on Instagram and Twitter.

In 2016, she appeared on the cover of Forbes Woman Africa, alongside three other women who were all given a headline for being the Faces of Entrepreneurship. She released her book From A to B and premiered her own reality show Being Bonang, both in 2017. In 2018, she was featured on the power issue of GQ SA, for the September edition. In 2024, She was the presenter for the 2024 Earthshot Prize Awards held in Cape Town, South Africa, a first for the awards in any African country.

== Early life ==
Bonang was born on 25 June 1987 in Mahikeng borough of North West, to Charlotte Mokoena, the Executive Vice-president for Human Resource and Corporate Affairs of Sasol, and Gampi Matheba, a senior lecturer at North-West University. She is of the Bantu-speaking ethnic group Tswana.

The family relocated to Leondale, in the East of Johannesburg, while Bonang attended Fourways High School, a government co-ed school in Fourways, Johannesburg.

== Career ==
=== Television and film ===
In 2002, Matheba made her television debut on the SABC 2 kids show, Manhattan Fantasy Challenge while she was 15. She also appeared in several other SABC 2 kids shows. In 2007, Matheba auditioned for the inaugural season of the SABC 1 music show LIVE (now Live Amp) after leaving varsity. She was later crowned the winner of the show to co-host alongside Tbo Touch. Her presenting duties were a huge success and that's where her sobriquet "Queen B" was created. Her final episode was aired on 31 August 2012 as she announced she was leaving the show. After her departure from LIVE, she hosted several other shows including Clash of the Choirs SA, Afternoon Express, Top Billing and KFC Taste Kitchen.

Matheba has hosted numerous award shows and prominent events the most notable being MTV Africa Music Awards 2016, Miss South Africa 2018, and the pre-shows for the 2014 MTV Europe Music Awards and BET Awards 2016. On 2 December 2018, Matheba co-hosted the Global Citizen: Mandela 100 concert alongside comedian Trevor Noah, supermodel Naomi Campbell, PistolWhipPapi and other notable public figures.

In 2008, Matheba made her debut drama role on the SABC 1 show, InterSEXions where she played Nurse Seipati. As of 2019, Matheba starred and co-produced the documentary film Public Figure, which premiered on March, 9 at Manchester Film Festival.

Matheba founded her production house called Bonang Matheba Entertainment in 2017. The production unit has one show, which is the 1Magic reality show, Being Bonang which focuses and showcases Matheba's daily life.

In May 2022, she co-hosted Africa Magic Viewers' Choice Awards.

In August 2023, Matheba was announced as the host of Miss South Africa pageant 2023.

Towards the end of July 2024, Bonang announced her reality show B’Dazzled by Bonang, premiered on SABC 3 at 18:00 pm SAST, on July 29.

In early September 2024, Matheba was announced as the host of Miss Universe pageant.

Matheba, along with Billy Porter, hosted the Earthshot Prize Awards held in Cape Town on 6 November 2024.

=== Radio ===
In 2009, Matheba received a call from radio station YFM in which she was told that she'll be added to the new line-up of presenters. She received her own weekend afternoon show called, "The B* Hive", which was an instant success mainly focusing on young listeners. She then left the radio show in 2014.

Matheba was announced as a new radio DJ for radio station Metro FM in 2015. She replaced Siphokazi January who became the new Metro FM veteran. Matheba's slot show The Front Row, had a great and joyful listenership until a dispute with the radio station's manager, after an on-air reshuffle that saw Bonang hosting the show alongside her rumored longtime industry rival Lerato Kganyago without her notification arose. Outraged by their lack of communication, Bonang resigned from the radio station the next day.

=== Fashion ===
In 2008, Matheba made a collaboration with retailer Legit in launching her first clothing line, "Just B". She then partnered with a London-based designer to create a handbag collection called "Baby Star".

In 2014, high-end South African retail brand Woolworths, revealed a collaboration with Bonang. They dropped a lingerie line "Distraction By Bonang", which is still ongoing as new collections were introduced.

In 2018, Matheba alongside Superbalist, dropped a collection of T-shirts named "BONANG by Bonang Matheba". The T-shirts had famous Bonang quotes printed on them, including "Mo'ghel", "Give The People What They Want" and "#IAmBonang".

=== The House of BNG ===
On 18 March 2019, Matheba exclusively partnered with Woolworths in launching a range of luxury Méthode Cap Classique (MCC) called, "The House of BNG". The venture made her the first black woman to be added to the Méthode Cap Classique Association.

=== Other projects ===
==== Endorsements ====
In 2013, she was named the ambassador of cosmetic brand Revlon in South Africa. The deal made her the first international ambassador for the brand outside the United States.

In October 2016, Matheba was unveiled as an ambassador for the vodka brand, Cîroc in Africa, alongside fashion designer David Tlale, hip hop artist, Da L.E.S and club DJ, DJ Dimplez.

After a trip to Brazil in 2017, she was named the new African Brand Ambassador for Ipanema sandals, taking over from Brazilian supermodel Gisele Bündchen. It was later revealed that during her trip she had taken meetings with the Brazilian sandal-makers and even shot an advertisement in Rio de Janeiro.

In 2018, Matheba signed an endorsement deal with cellular network Cell C, a deal that saw her partnering with them to also launch her own mobile app and an emoji pack called "BMoji". Other Bonang's endorsements include Peugeot, BIC Razors, Brutal Fruit, Diva Divine Hair, Lifestyle Pads, and Courvoisier.

In 2020, Bonang was announced as Samsung South Africa's ambassador, for their S20 range and the Z Flip. In September 2020, she was featured on Glamour Magazine cover with a fashion designer Rich Mnisi.

==== Writing ====
On 7 June 2017, Matheba released her autobiographical book From A to B written through Black Bird Books' Thabiso Mahlape. The book received negative publicity from the South African public, with many lambasting the book on social media regarding its litany of spelling, grammatical and factual errors. The outcry led to the book being pulled from store shelves by book retailing giant Exclusive Books. It was later replaced with a second edition where many of the previous errors were corrected.

== Personal life ==
Matheba dated the local hip-hop artist, Slikour until 2009. In 2012, Matheba dated record producer and disc jockey Euphonik. Euphonik was charged with assault after it surfaced that he physically assaulted her. She then dropped the charges after the couple reconciled. As she dropped the charges, people had accusations that Matheba lied about the incident. Matheba refuted these claims, stating: "I never anticipated how badly I would be treated when the story of my break-up was leaked. It was one of the most painful experiences and sometimes I am not sure how I survived", a reference about him in her book, From A To B. She then removed the reference in the second version of the book.

From late 2015 to 2017, Matheba dated rapper AKA. Their relationship, having started as an affair, was filled with controversy, taking place while AKA was dating a then-pregnant DJ Zinhle, who later exposed the fling in August 2015 following their split.

Matheba has since kept the details of her partners and personal life relatively private.

== Filmography ==
=== Television ===
Year	Title	Role	Notes
2007–2012	Live Amp	Herself	Host
2011	InterSEXions	Nurse Seipati	Television series
2012	18th South African Music Awards	Herself	Host
2012	Top Billing	Herself	Presenter
2013	Don't Judge	Herself	
2014	Zaziwa	Herself	Guest
2014	2014 MTV Europe Music Awards	Herself	Pre-show host
2015–2016	Afternoon Express	Herself	Presenter
2016	E! Africa Red-Carpet	Herself	Host
2016	BET Awards 2016	Herself	Pre-show host
2016	MTV Africa Music Awards 2016	Herself	Co-Host
2017	2017 Namibia Annual Music Awards	Herself	Host
2017	KFC Taste Kitchen	Herself	Host
2017–2019	Being Bonang	Herself	Main role
2017	2017 DStv Mzansi Viewers' Choice Awards	Herself	Host
2018	Miss South Africa 2018	Herself	Host
2018	Real Talk	Herself	Guest
2018	2018 DStv Mzansi Viewers' Choice Awards	Herself	Host
2018	Global Citizen: Mandela 100	Herself	Co-host
2018	Tropika Smoooth Fan	Herself	Celebrity Guest
2019	PSL Awards	Herself	Host
2019	Miss South Africa 2019	Herself	Host
2023	Miss South Africa 2023	Herself	Host
2024	Miss South Africa 2024	Herself	Host
2024	Earthshot Prize Awards	Herself	Co-host

=== Film ===
Year	Title	Role	Notes
2019	Public Figure	Herself	Appearance; Co-producer

== Accolades ==
Bonang Matheba awards and nominations
Awards and nominations (Note: Certain award groups do not simply award one winner. They recognize several different recipients and have runners-up. Since this is a specific recognition and is different from losing an award, runner-up mentions are considered wins in this award tally. Awards in certain categories do not have prior nominations and only winners are announced by the jury. For simplification and to avoid errors, each award in this list has been presumed to have had a prior nomination.)
Award	Wins	Nominations
5 For Changemaker Award	1	1
Abryanz Style and Fashion Awards	1	2
Basadi in Music Awards	1	1
Channel 24 Social Media Awards	0	2
DStv Mzansi Viewers' Choice Awards	1	2
The Feather Awards	3	8
Glamour Women of the Year	1	1
Global Social Award	1	1
New African Woman Magazine	0	2
Nickelodeon Kids Choice Awards	1	1
South African Film and Television Awards	1	5
South African Style Awards	1	4
YOU Spectacular Award	1	0
- Totals
Wins	13
Nominations	30

=== African Entertainment Awards USA ===
Year	Nominee / work	Award	Result	Ref.
2024	Herself	Media Personality of the Year	Nominated	

=== Basadi in Music Awards ===
Year	Nominee / work	Award	Result	Ref.
2026	Herself	Trailblazer of the Year	Won	

=== National Film and Television Awards ===
Year	Nominee / work	Award	Result	Ref.
2024	Herself	Celebrity Personality of the Year	Nominated	
2024	Herself	Best Female TV Personality 2024	Nominated	
2024	Herself	Best TV Presenter 2024	Nominated	
