= Shannon Benting =

South African beauty pageant titleholder

- Born: Johannesburg, Gauteng, South Africa
- Beauty pageant titleholder
- Title: Miss African Beauty Supranational 2026; Miss Supranational South Africa 2026
- Major competitions: Miss African Beauty Supranational 2026; (Winner); Miss Supranational 2026; (Uplaced)

Shannon Benting is a South African model, content creator and beauty pageant titleholder who won Miss African Beauty Supranational 2026 and Miss Supranational South Africa 2026. She represented South Africa at Miss Supranational 2026 in Poland and was unplaced.

== Pageantry ==
=== Miss Supranational 2026 ===
Benting's first pageant was Miss African Beauty 2026 where she reached the top 30. On the 6th June 2026, she won Miss African Beauty Supranational 2026 and Miss Supranational South Africa 2026. In July 2026, she represented South Africa at Miss Supranational in Poland, concluding South Africa's consecutive placement streak at Miss Supranational that had been maintained since 2021. During the international stage of the competition, Benting shared a video where she took the opportunity to address South African mothers directly:

I'm honoured to represent bold and diverse South Africa. I'm a model and content creator' but my greatest achievement is being a mother. I'm here to remind all women, and especially mothers, that you can do it all, you can be it all, and you can have it all – with a child on your hip. Because we are fully capable of carrying both a child and a dream.

Benting secured her place in the pegeant's Influencer Challenge Top 20. She wore a dress named "Mother of the Nation" for her national costume, which pays a tribute to South African women and celebrates motherhood. At the end of the event of the Miss Supranational 2026, Benting was unplaced where Katrina Llegado of the Philippines was crowned the winner.

Awards and achievements
Preceded by Lebohang Raputsoe	Miss Supranational South Africa; 2026	Succeeded by Incumbent
New title	Miss African Beauty Supranational; 2026	Succeeded by Incumbent
