= Laduma Ngxokolo =

South African fashion designer (born 1986)

- Born: Laduma Ngxokolo; 15 December 1986 (age 39); Port Elizabeth, Eastern Cape, South Africa
- Education: Nelson Mandela University; University of the Arts London
- Occupations: Fashion designer; businessman
- Years active: 2010–present
- Known for: MaXhosa

Laduma Ngxokolo (born 15 December 1986) is a South African fashion designer and businessman. He is best known for his luxury clothing brand MaXhosa.

== Early life ==
Ngxokolo was born and raised in Port Elizabeth, South Africa and heavily influenced by his Xhosa heritage. He attended Lawson Brown High School, where he formally studied art and began textile design in 2003. During this time, he started a small business making scarves and beanies for classmates to support himself after his mother passed away. He first graduated from the Nelson Mandela University where he obtained BTech in Textile Design and Technology in 2010. By 2016, he earned a scholarship to Central Saint Martins in London, completing a master's degree in Material Futures.

== Career ==
Ngxokolo began his fashion career in 2010 when his The Colourful World of the Xhosa Culture collection won the international Society of Dyers and Colourists design competition in London. He officially launched MaXhosa, also known as Maxhosa Africa in 2010, initially focusing on menswear before expanding into womenswear in 2014. He won an awards for Vogue Italia at Pilazzo Morando show. By 2016, he was named the Design Indaba Most Beautiful Object in South Africa winner and listed among the 100 Most Influential Africans by New African magazine in 2017. In 2019, he acquired a Johannesburg based knitting factory to localize production and began showcasing at major events like New York Fashion Week in 2020. In 2021, he received the African Luxury Heritage Brand of the Year award in France.

Ngxokolo's global profile rose significantly in 2024 when he opened a flagship store in Manhattan and made his debut on the official Paris Fashion Week calendar with the collection "My Conviction". His business had diversified through collaborations with Mercedes Benz, evolving from a knitwear label into a comprehensive lifestyle brand. In 2025, he went to Paris for his third and fourth seasons, presenting the "Umbulelo" and "Lo Ngu Mbulelo" collections, which celebrated 15 years of his design journey. He was honored with the Outstanding Contribution to Fashion Award at the inaugural South African Fashion Awards and inducted into the BoF 500 Class of 2025.
