= Miss South Africa 2024 =

66th Miss South Africa Pageant

- Date: 10 August 2024
- Presenters: Bonang Matheba
- Entertainment: Jesse Clegg; Kamo Mphela; Zoë Madiga; Lebo Mashile
- Venue: SunBet Arena, Time Square, Pretoria
- Broadcaster: SABC 3; Miss South Africa App
- Winner: Mia le Roux; Western Cape

Miss South Africa 2024 was the 66th edition of the Miss South Africa pageant, held at the SunBet Arena in Pretoria, South Africa, on 10 August 2024.

The winner was Mia le Roux of Western Cape. She was crowned by her predecessor Natasha Joubert of Gauteng. She is the first deaf woman to win the Miss South Africa title.

== Results ==
=== Placements ===
Placement	Contestant
Miss South Africa 2024	Western Cape – Mia le Roux
1st Runner-Up	Gauteng – Nompumelelo Maduna
2nd Runner-Up	North West – Onalenna Constantin
Top 5	Gauteng – Layla Zoubair; Gauteng – Ontshiametse Tlhopane
Top 7	Gauteng – Taahira Katz; Gauteng – Kirsten Khan
Top 10	Mpumalanga – Kebalepile Ramafoko; KwaZulu-Natal – Lebohang Khoza; Gauteng – Palesa Lombard

== Crown Chasers ==
=== Top 16 ===
This Top 16 were selected and therefore advanced in the competition on Episode 1 of Crown Chasers.

Delegate	Age	Status	Province	Hometown	Finish	Placement
Kebalepile Ramafoko	25	Finalist	Mpumalanga	Emahlaleni	—N/a	
Kirsten Khan	26	Finalist	Gauteng	Johannesburg	—N/a	
Layla Zoubair	29	Finalist	Gauteng	Kempton Park	—N/a	
Lebohang Khoza	27	Finalist	KwaZulu-Natal	Pietermaritzburg	—N/a	
Mia le Roux	28	Finalist	Western Cape	Oudtshoorn	—N/a	
Nompumelelo Maduna	28	Finalist	Gauteng	Soweto	—N/a	
Onalenna Constantin	26	Finalist	North West	Potchefstroom	—N/a	
Ontshiametse Tlhopane	23	Finalist	Gauteng	Soweto	—N/a	
Palesa Lombard	25	Finalist	Gauteng	Johannesburg	—N/a	
Taahira Katz	25	Finalist	Gauteng	Eldorado Park	—N/a	
Chidimma Adetshina	23	Withdrew	Gauteng	Soweto	Episode 6	11th
Lethaukuthula Ayanda Maseko	24	Eliminated	Gauteng	Daveyton	Episode 5	12th-13th
Nobuhle Langa	26	Eliminated	Mpumalanga	Emahlaleni	Episode 5	12th-13th
Nolene Spinks	23	Eliminated	Eastern Cape	Gqeberha	Episode 4	14th
Naledi Matlakala	24	Eliminated	Gauteng	Midrand	Episode 3	15th
Reinette Potgieter	26	Eliminated	Mpumalanga	Trichardt	Episode 2	16th

=== Elimination chart ===
Elimination chart
Contestant	Episode 1 (Note: Episode 1 determined the Top 16)	Episode 2	Episode 3	Episode 4	Episode 5	Episode 6
Nompumelelo Maduna		Win	Win	High	High	2nd
Layla Zoubair			High			5th
Mia le Roux		High	Low	Win	Win	1st
Lebohang Khoza				Low		10th
Onalenna Constantin			High	High	High	3rd
Ontshiametse Tlhopane						4th
Palesa Lombard						8th
Taahira Katz		Win				6th
Kebalepile Ramafoko				Low		9th
Kirsten Khan		Low				7th
Chidimma Adetshina					Low	Withdrew
Lethaukuthula Ayanda Maseko					Out	
Nobuhle Langa					Out	
Nolene Spinks		Low	Low	Out		
Naledi Matlakala			Out			
Reinette Potgieter		Out				

Colour key:

Contestant was chosen by the judges as the winner of the episode.
Contestant was included by the judges in the top three of the episode, but not the winner.
Contestant got through to the next episode, but was not in the top three or bottom three.
Contestant was included by the judges in the bottom three of the episode, but was not eliminated.
Contestant was eliminated from the competition.
Contestant withdrew from the competition.
Contestant was selected to be a Miss South Africa 2024 finalist.
Contestant was chosen by the judges as the winner of the episode, and selected to be a Miss South Africa 2024 finalist.
Contestant was included by the judges in the bottom three of the episode, and selected to be a Miss South Africa 2024 finalist.

== Top 30 ==
The Top 30 semifinalists were announced on 22 May, will be advanced to the top 16. Those who did not advance were:

Delegate	Age	Province	Hometown
Andrea Morrison	25	KwaZulu-Natal	Durban
Danae Kukard	24	Eastern Cape	East London
Demoivre Bjalane	26	Limpopo	Monsterlus
Denechia Lowings	24	Gauteng	Centurion
Felicia Modupe Lutendo Bajomo	27	Limpopo	Thohoyandou
Janeke van Tonder	23	Free State	Hennenman
Johaneske Pelzer	23	North West	Potchefstroom
Kayla Wagg	22	Gauteng	Johannesburg
Kaylan Zeelie	21	Eastern Cape	Uitenhage
Madri van Jaarsveld	27	Gauteng	Boksburg
Nokulunga Zungu	29	KwaZulu-Natal	Umlazi
Shané Maloney	20	Gauteng	Pretoria
Sherry Wang	29	Gauteng	Sandton
Sinenhlanhla Mthethwa	23	KwaZulu-Natal	Richards Bay

== Judges ==
=== Semi-finals ===
- Leandie du Randt — Actress, television personality
- Lerato Kganyago — Media and television personality and entrepreneur
- Stephanie Weil — CEO of Miss South Africa

=== Finals ===
- Leandie du Randt — Actress, television personality
- Lerato Kganyago — Media and television personality and entrepreneur
- Rolene Strauss — Miss South Africa 2014 and Miss World 2014
- Jo-Ann Strauss — Miss South Africa 2000
- Thembi Seete — Actress and musician

== Controversy ==
Chidimma Adetshina withdrew from the competition due to a controversy about her nationality.
