= Miss South Africa 2018 =

Beauty pageant edition

- Date: 27 May 2018
- Presenters: Bonang Matheba
- Entertainment: Nádine; Sketchy Bongo; DJ Zinhle; Lady Zamar; Tamara Dey
- Venue: Sun Arena at Time Square, Pretoria, South Africa
- Broadcaster: M-Net; DStv; Mzansi Magic
- Entrants: 28
- Placements: 12
- Winner: Tamaryn Green; Western Cape

Miss South Africa 2018 was the 60th edition of Miss South Africa pageant, held at the Sun Arena at Time Square in Pretoria, on May 27, 2018.

Adè van Heerden of Western Cape crowned Tamaryn Green as her successor at the end of the event. Green represented South Africa at Miss Universe 2018 where she placed as First Runner-up. Keyi represented South Africa at Miss World 2018, placing in the Top 30. For the first time, two separate delegates were selected to represent South Africa at Miss World and Miss Universe, but only one was crowned Miss South Africa.

== Results ==
Color keys

- The contestant Won in an International pageant.
- The contestant was a Runner-up in an International pageant.
- The contestant was a Semi-Finalist in an International pageant.
- Unplaced

Placement	Contestant	International placement
Miss South Africa 2018	Western Cape – Tamaryn Green	1st Runner-Up
Miss Universe South Africa 2018	Western Cape – Tamaryn Green	1st Runner-Up
Runner Up	Eastern Cape – Thulisa Keyi	Top 30
Miss World South Africa 2018	Eastern Cape – Thulisa Keyi	Top 30
Top 5	Eastern Cape – Thandokazi Mfundisi; KwaZulu-Natal – Karishma Ramdev; KwaZulu-Natal – Noxolo Ndebele	
Top 12	Free State – Margo Fargo; Gauteng – Anzelle van Staden; Gauteng – Bryoni Govender; Gauteng – Daniellë de Jager; Gauteng – Tamarin Bensch; Gauteng – Tharina Botes; Mpumalanga – Akile Khoza	

== Semifinalists ==
Name	Age	Province	Hometown
Akile Khoza	23	Mpumalanga	Bushbuckridge
Altina Vries	26	Northern Cape	Steinkopf
Anzelle van Staden	24	Gauteng	Pretoria
Avania Reddy	25	KwaZulu-Natal	Westville
Bryoni Govender	21	Gauteng	Kempton Park
Chanté Holloway	23	Western Cape	Atlantis
Chanté Jantjies	25	Gauteng	Johannesburg
Daniellë de Jager	20	Gauteng	Benoni
Danielle Wallace	25	KwaZulu-Natal	Mount Edgecombe
Eureka Khambako	23	Mpumalanga	Hazyview
Karishma Ramdev	23	KwaZulu-Natal	Chatsworth
Leah Prinsloo	22	KwaZulu-Natal	Morningside
Lethukwenama Letsoalo	22	KwaZulu-Natal	Bergville
Lisa Stoffela	25	KwaZulu-Natal	Margate
Margo Fargo	25	Free State	Heidedal
Michelle Howell	24	Gauteng	Kempton Park
Noxolo Ndebele	24	KwaZulu-Natal	Pinetown
Rethabile Lethoko	22	Gauteng	Johannesburg
Rito-Grace Madingana	25	Free State	Welkom
Tamarin Bensch	25	Gauteng	Bedfordview
Tamaryn Green	23	Western Cape	Paarl
Taryn Bornman	25	Gauteng	Pretoria
Tegan Goldman	25	Eastern Cape	Bethelsdorp
Thandokazi Mfundisi	23	Eastern Cape	East London
Tharina Botes	21	Gauteng	Roodepoort
Thulisa Keyi	22	Eastern Cape	East London
Tshegofatso Moloto	22	Gauteng	Buccleuch
Thokozile Mbatha	26	Northern Cape	Kimberley

== Judges ==
- Anele Mdoda – radio jockey
- Khaya Dlanga – marketing personality
- Khanyi Dhlomo – businesswoman and media mogul
- Janez Vermeiren – entrepreneur and television presenter
- Michelle van Breda – magazine editor
- Siba Mtongana – celebrity chef and television personality
- Rolene Strauss – Miss South Africa 2014 and Miss World 2014

== Notes ==
- Tamaryn Green competed at Miss Universe 2018 held in Bangkok, Thailand. Green placed as the First Runner-up to Catriona Gray of Philippines.
- Thulisa Keyi competed at Miss World 2018 held in Sanya, China. Keyi placed in the Top 30 of said pageant.
- Bryoni Govender competed at Miss Universe 2023 held in El Salvador and made the Top 20.
- Tharina Botes had competed before at Miss International 2016 held in Tokyo, Japan. Later she competed at Miss Grand Thailand 2019 held in Bangkok, Thailand where she placed Top 10, Miss Thailand Universe 2021 in Pattaya where she placed First Runner-up to Anchilee Scott-Kemmis, and competed at Miss World 2024 held in Mumbai, India representing Thailand.
