= Tamaryn Green =

South African model, physician, and beauty queen

- Born: 19 August 1994 (age 32); Worcester, South Africa
- Education: University of Cape Town
- Height: 1.80 m (5 ft 11 in)
- Spouse: Ze Nxumalo (m. 2022)
- Beauty pageant titleholder
- Title: Miss South Africa 2018
- Hair color: Black
- Eye color: Brown
- Major competitions: Miss South Africa 2018 (Winner); Miss Universe 2018 (1st Runner-Up)

Tamaryn Nxumalo (née Green; born 19 August 1994) is a South African beauty pageant titleholder who was crowned Miss South Africa 2018. She represented South Africa in the Miss Universe 2018 competition and placed as the first runner-up.

== Early life and education ==
Green was born on 19 August 1994 in Worcester, Western Cape to parents David Green and Ellirene Green. Originally from Worcester, the family moved to Paarl when Green was nine years old. She is of Cape Coloured origin. Her father works as a curriculum adviser while her mother is a teacher. Green attended New Orleans Secondary School in Paarl.

Green studied medicine at the University of Cape Town, graduating with a medical degree in 2019. In June 2015, she was diagnosed with tuberculosis while a medical student; she entered remission in December 2015.

== Pageantry ==
Green was initially announced as one of the 28 regional qualifiers for Miss South Africa 2018 in April 2018. She later was able to advance to the televised competition as one of the top twelve competitors. During the final competition, Green advanced into the top five and then into the top two, where she was crowned Miss Universe South Africa 2018 by outgoing titleholder, Demi-Leigh Nel-Peters, becoming the South African representative in Miss Universe 2018. Afterwards, she was crowned Miss South Africa 2018 with Miss World South Africa being Thulisa Keyi. She was crowned by her predecessor Adè van Heerden.

As Miss South Africa 2018, Green went on to represent South Africa at Miss Universe 2018. During the final word round, each delegate was asked the same question: "What is the most important lesson you've learned and how will you apply it to your time as Miss Universe?" Green replied:

Throughout my life, I've been exposed to both those who are privileged and underprivileged and what I learned is we are all human. We all want to be loved, we all want to belong, and we all want to be seen so we should treat each other that way.

== Personal life ==
Green married businessman Ze Nxumalo in April 2022 at the Quoin Rock Wine Estate in Stellenbosch.

Awards and achievements
Preceded by (Colombia) Laura González	Miss Universe (1st Runner Up); 2018	Succeeded by (Puerto Rico) Madison Anderson
Preceded by (Western Cape) Demi-Leigh Nel-Peters	Miss Universe; South Africa; 2018	Succeeded by (Eastern Cape) Zozibini Tunzi
Preceded by (Western Cape) Adè van Heerden	Miss South Africa; 2018	Succeeded by (Eastern Cape) Zozibini Tunzi
