= Mia le Roux =

South African beauty pageant titleholder

- Born: Mia le Roux; 28 June 1995 (age 31); Sasolburg, Free State, South Africa
- Height: 1.78 m (5 ft 10 in)
- Beauty pageant titleholder
- Title: Miss South Africa 2024
- Hair color: Brown
- Eye color: Green
- Major competitions: Miss South Africa 2024; (Winner); Miss Universe 2024; (Withdrew)

Mia le Roux (28 June 1995) is a South African beauty pageant titleholder who was crowned Miss South Africa 2024. She represented South Africa at Miss Universe 2024, but withdrew for health reasons.

== Early life ==
Le Roux was born in Sasolburg, Free State on 28 June 1995 and later relocated to Oudtshoorn in the Western Cape, where she was raised. Le Roux currently resides in Rosebank in Cape Town.

Le Roux was diagnosed with profound hearing loss, at the age of one and as result she was fitted with a cochlear implant to aid her hearing.

Her educational background includes attending Oudtshoorn High School and earning a nutrition certificate from the Sport Science Institute of South Africa and an exercise specialist diploma from Eta College. She is also a part-time B.Com Marketing student.

== Pageantry ==
=== Miss South Africa 2024 ===
Le Roux won Miss South Africa 2024, held at the SunBet Arena in Menlyn, Pretoria, on 10 August 2024, competing against nine other contestants. She had previously been announced as one of the 30 semifinalists in May 2024. She made history as the first woman with impaired hearing to be crowned Miss South Africa.

=== Miss Universe 2024 ===
Le Roux represented South Africa at Miss Universe 2024 in Mexico, but withdrew due to "health concerns" on 14 November 2024. The statement by the Miss South Africa Organisation regarding le Roux's withdrawal did not disclose the nature of her health concern.

Awards and achievements
Preceded by Natasha Joubert	Miss South Africa; 2024	Succeeded by Qhawekazi Mazaleni
Preceded by Bryoni Govender	Miss Universe South Africa; 2024	Succeeded by Melissa Nayimuli
