= Gert-Johan Coetzee =

South African fashion designer

Gert-Johan Coetzee (born 18 November 1987), is a South African fashion artist. His fashion atelier is based in Linden, Johannesburg in Gauteng province. He specialises in couture red carpet gowns, he also designs ready-to-wear range. Coetzee is known for dressing South African and international celebrities at red-carpet events.

== Early life and education ==
Coetzee was born in Koster, North West Province. His love for fashion started at a very early age, and when he was in Grade Two he told his mother that one day he was going to be a famous fashion designer. He attended Koster primary school until Grade Four and then was home-schooled. As a young boy in school he used to dress his pencils up in tissue paper and by the age of sixteen he started studying at the North West School of Design. He graduated from NWSD in 2005.

== Career and the Gert-Johan Coetzee label ==
During Coetzee's second year at college (2004) he won the High Fashion Award at the annual Vukani Awards. This is where he was spotted by the television personality Sandy Ngema. He dressed her for the red carpet at the Durban July Handicap premier horseracing event that year and also went on to dress her for two seasons as presenter of the SABC3 reality TV series Strictly Come Dancing. In 2006, at the young age of 19, Coetzee was named South Africa's Most Promising Designer at the Cape Town Fashion festival. His first commercial venture was as partner in the Diamond Face Couture label with businesswoman Uyanda Mbuli which launched in 2006. He went on his own in 2010 and launched Gert-Johan Coetzee Pty Ltd at the age of 22. He has since shown his collections at South Africa Fashion week as well as showcasing his work at international Fashion Week shows in Canada at Vancouver Fashion Week, Angola and Nigeria. His couture designs are worn at all major fashion events including the Durban July Handicap, J&B Met, SA Music Awards, Huisgenoot Skouspel, You Spectacular and Miss World. His gowns have been worn by presenters of popular TV shows such as Strictly Come Dancing and Top Billing. Just a year into establishing his own label Coetzee achieved a celebrity coup when international TV stars Kourteney Kardashian (Keeping Up with the Kardashians). and Kristin Cavallari (The Hills) wore GJC dresses on the Hollywood red carpet. He subsequently also dressed soap opera star Arianna Zucker (Days of Our Lives) in 2012, and Kelly Rowland, (in 2013, at the 40th anniversary of the Ms Foundation for Women in Beverly Hills, in honour of its founder Gloria Steinem. Coetzee has a long list of high-end clients and celebrities including such notable figures as Revlon Ambassador Bonang Matheba, Pabi Moloi, Tamara Dey, Lira, Liezel van der Westhuizen, Cindy Nell, Terry Pheto, Tatum Keshwar, Kerry McGregor, Louise Carver, Doreen Morris as well as several influential women in politics and African royalty. Coetzee is also the first South African Swarovski brand ambassador. Coetzee is interested in technological advances in fashion and constantly pushes the envelope in his collections. In April 2013 he was the first South African fashion designer to utilise hi-tech 3D-printing technology in his SA Fashion Week Spring Summer 2013 "sea urchin" collection. He collaborated with the Vaal University of Technology on the technical side, to render and print three-dimensional embellishments to incorporate into the garments. Then in October 2013, at the next SA Fashion Week, he looked to new technologies again and collaborated with photographer Nicole Phillips to captured his all-pink Autumn Winter 2014 collection with never-before seen in South Africa time-slice fashion photography on an intricate set using 40 cameras firing simultaneously.

== Social condition ==
Coetzee believes in "fashion with a conscience" and is known for using his platform and voice as a celebrity designer in the media to bring attention to social issues, mainly concentrating on women. Coetzee first launched this concept in September 2012 when he met Thando Hopa, a prosecutor with the National Prosecuting Authority, who has albinism and whom he convinced to become the face of his new collection. Hopa had never modelled before but her appearance on the catwalk at SA Fashion Week in GJC caused a stir in the fashion industry. In the process GJC and Hopa raised awareness of the plight of people with albinism who still face superstition and discrimination in Africa. The partnership between GJC and Thando Hopa endures and she has since become a spokesperson for people with albinism. In April 2013 Coetzee partnered up with Shout, the South African anticrime organisation and dedicated his Spring/Summer 2013 "sea urchin" collection to women victims of violence, in protest against the high levels of violence against women in SA society. Inspired by the protective, dangerous spines of the fragile sea urchin, he created 3D-printed spikes which embellished his garments symbolising armour-like wearable protection for women. Then for his "all pink" Auntumn/Winter 2014 SA Fashion week collection he dedicated it to breast cancer awareness. For this collection, Gert-Johan Coetzee partnered up with the organisation The Pink Drive, which is a mobile organisation that brings breast cancer awareness to the public and testing facilities via trucks with built in equipment. The message he wished to convey through this couture range is "take charge of yourself".
