= MaXhosa =

MaXhosa by Laduma is a luxury clothing label in South Africa that was founded by Laduma Ngxokolo. His knitwear was originally intended for initiates (amakrwala) who were looking for heritage atire to wear when they returned to town.

Today, Ngxokolo is an internationally renowned award-winning designer who focuses on wool and mohair knitwear and textiles. His company is a significant fashion exporter to the United States, Paris, Japan, Nigeria and Netherlands. MaXhosa sells woven clothing that uses beadwork patterns, symbolism and the rich culture of the Xhosa people. MaXhosa embodies the beauty, language and aspirations of the Xhosa people.

== Background ==
Laduma Ngxokolo was a student at Nelson Mandela University where he completed his B Tech. His student work won him seed funding, from where he launched his brand of clothing. In 2011, he went as a student to the Designer Indaba from where this traditional clothing company was launched Ngxolo wanted to reflect his heritage and felt it was important to wear beautiful, modern, traditional clothing that would be worn or suitable for the Xhosa initiates as they returned from the mountains to the city.

In 2021, ten years after its founding, MaXhosa's recognizable knits, patterns and beadwork has led to the brand being dubbed "the Missoni of Africa". By 2025, the MaXhosa brand had established itself and was branching out into home wares.
