= Dangoor =

Dangoor is a surname. Notable people with the surname include:

- David Dangoor (born 1948), British businessman
- Ezra Dangoor (1848–1930), Chief Rabbi of Baghdad
- Naim Dangoor (1914–2015), British-naturalised Iraqi-born Jewish entrepreneur and philanthropist
- Renée Dangoor (1925–2008), Iraqi beauty queen
