= Mohammed Saud =

Saudi internet personality disappeared in 2023

Mohammed Saud (born 1990) is a Saudi internet personality who exceptionally expressed support for the State of Israel and the normalization agreement between Israel and Saudi Arabia. On October 3, 2023, he disappeared, and since then, his whereabouts are unknown.

== History ==
Mohammed Saud was born in 1990. He is allegedly a law student who studied in the United States, and a graduate with a bachelor's degree in law from King Saud University in Riyadh. According to him, he loves the songs of Zohar Argov, Margalit Tzan'ani, and Chava Alberstein. Over the years, Saud became one of the most dominant pro-Israel voices in the Arab world. He amassed tens of thousands of followers on social media, and posted many videos and interviews promoting the peace agreement between Israel and Arab states. In August 2019, he was interviewed by Channel 13, and in August 2023, he was interviewed by the main edition of Now 14, inviting the citizens of the State of Israel to visit Riyadh. After the Saudi Arabian national team's victory over Argentina in the 2022 World Cup in Qatar, the Prime Minister of Israel called to congratulate him.

=== The Temple Mount Assault Incident ===
In July 2019, he visited Israel after being invited by the Ministry of Foreign Affairs. During that visit, he met with Prime Minister Benjamin Netanyahu, and even visited the Temple Mount, where he was verbally attacked and spat upon by Palestinians who shouted at him "Go to a synagogue" and "You are not welcome at the holy site". Following this, the IDF spokesperson in Arabic, Avichay Adraee, responded: "What happened with blogger Mohammed Saud in Jerusalem by thugs is very sad. Is this how you treat someone who wants to pray? May God avenge you. Shame on you". Miss Iraq, Sarah Idan, also condemned the attack: "A Saudi visited Al-Aqsa, how did the Palestinians react? By spitting on him, trying to insult him, calling him 'animal' and suggesting he go pray with the Jews and with Trump. Is this fitting for Muslims, whose even children do not respect a Muslim from a sister country visiting Al-Aqsa and spitting on him? Unlike those who did these acts, he is not an animal". The Israeli Ministry of Foreign Affairs also condemned the attack. The police arrested several suspects in the assault from East Jerusalem.

==== His Views on Israeli Politics ====
Saud used to express his views on Israeli politics and express support for the election of Benjamin Netanyahu and Likud. His tweets were promoted by Netanyahu and his son Yair Netanyahu. He also expressed his views on the internal party politics of the Likud Party.

=== The Disappearance Incident ===
On October 3, 2023, during the Sukkot holiday, Mohammed Saud was supposed to meet with the Minister of Communications Shlomo Karhi in Saudi Arabia, and he even built a sukkah in his honor. But a short time before that, he disappeared. Saud was also supposed to appear on the Patriots program on Channel 14. The Orientalist Edy Cohen, who spoke with Saud a few days earlier, provided unverified information in his possession, Saud was arrested and interrogated by the Saudi police, who did not look favorably upon his connections with Israeli politicians who were in Saudi Arabia at that time. Saud's last tweet included a picture of Karhi with the Four Species in Saudi Arabia, alongside the caption: "Friends, is this a dream? A prayer quorum with a Torah scroll and the Four Species here in Riyadh during Sukkot openly! What is this if not true peace? There will be a synagogue and kosher restaurants here very soon. Peace is already here".
