= Miss Iraq in America =

- Formation: July 11, 2013; 11 years ago
- Type: Beauty pageant
- Headquarters: Chicago
- Location: United States
- Official language: English & Arabic
- Key people: Joe Rasho (President)
- Website: http://www.missiraqusa.com

Miss Iraq in America (Arabic: ملكة جمال العراق في أمريكا) was an annual beauty pageant, first held in 2013. The competition was supervised by Yalla Fan, an artistic production company founded by Iraqi Assyrian Joe Rasho. Contestants were required to be unmarried women of Iraqi descent residing in the United States, between the ages of 18 and 27.

== History ==
The first Miss Iraq in America ceremony was held in 2013 in Chicago, Illinois. There were fifteen contestants competing for the title. The winner was Lavin Hama, followed by first-runner up Alina Oraha, and second-runner up Sjaa Al-Otaibi. The judging panel consisted of producer Billy Hado, Julius Isak, Dasco Charwani, celebrity decorator Per Mimi, decorator and designer Ghada Ajami, Dr. Rachel Corcis, and activist Samira Kirkawes.

The ceremony started with a dance inspired by hopes for peace. The pageant hosts introduced participants to the audience. The contest included video interviews where each woman spoke about their home city in Iraq and Iraq as a country. The ceremony also included culturally relevant song performances and interaction with the audience in the theatre. The pageant and subsequent celebration lasted until the early morning hours, with a show conclusion presented by the 19-year-old winner, Lavin Hama.

On November 26, 2014, the Miss Iraq-America Award ceremony was held for the second consecutive year in the state of Michigan and was won by Melinda Tuma, a student at the College of Pharmacy. The first runner-up was Farah Sto, followed by Lavinia Issa, Rita Ghannam, and Marie Curcis.

In the 2014 pageant, the opening ceremony again consisted of an expressionist dance symbolizing peace. The participants, along with visiting artist, Megan Hormuz, sang "Ghali Ya Iraq" by the Lebanese artist Rabie Baroud. Artist, Ismail Faruji, opened the concert with the song "Raise Your Head to the End of Iraq." The beauty pageant was attended by a selection of famous Iraqi artists including Dean Asmro, and Melad Yunus.

The next Miss Iraq-America contest was held in Bellagio Hall on Warren Street in Michigan on 12 March 2016. The 2016 pageant was attended by several acclaimed artists, most notably Hussam Al-Rassam. Sarah Idan won the Miss Iraq-America 2016 title with Lord Hanna and Anwar Hussein as first and second runner up respectively.

== Titleholders ==
Edition	Country	Name
2016	Iraq	Sarah Idan
2014	Iraq	Melinda Toma
2013	Iraq	Lavin Hama

== See also ==
- Iraqi beauty pageants
- Miss Iraq 2017
