= Gillain =

Gillain is a surname and given name. Notable people with the name include:

- Cyriaque Gillain (1857–1931), Belgian army officer
- Henri Gillain (1913–1999), Belgian teacher and comics enthusiast
- Marie Gillain (born 1975), Belgian actress
- Gillain Berry (born 1988), Jamaican-Aruban model and beauty queen
