= Miss Universe 2017 =

66th edition of the international beauty pageant

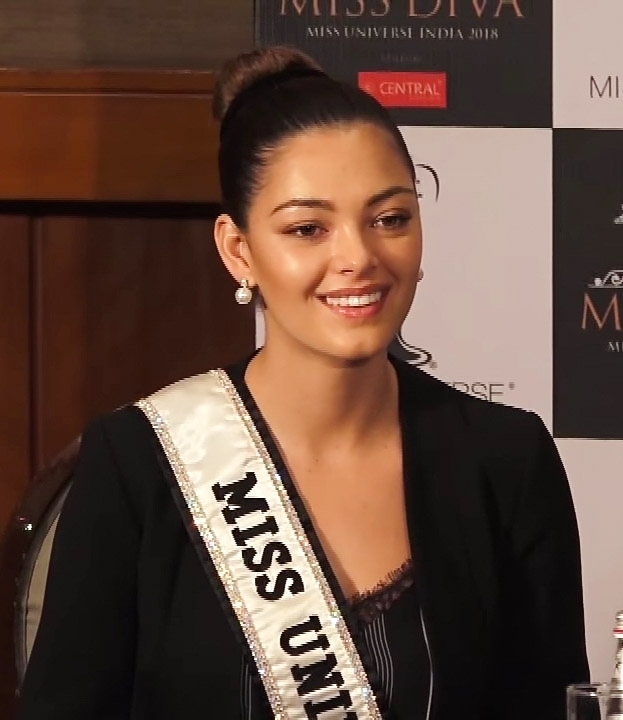
- Demi-Leigh Nel-Peters
- Date: 26 November 2017
- Presenters: Steve Harvey; Ashley Graham; Carson Kressley; Lu Sierra
- Entertainment: Fergie; Rachel Platten
- Venue: The AXIS, Las Vegas, Nevada, United States
- Broadcaster: Fox; Azteca
- Entrants: 92
- Placements: 16
- Debuts: Cambodia; Laos; Nepal
- Withdrawals: Belize; Denmark; Hungary; Kenya; Kosovo; Sierra Leone; Switzerland
- Returns: Egypt; El Salvador; Ethiopia; Ghana; Iraq; Ireland; Lebanon; Saint Lucia; Trinidad and Tobago; Zambia
- Winner: Demi-Leigh Nel-Peters; South Africa
- Congeniality: Farah Sedky, Egypt; Laura de Sanctis, Panama
- Best National Costume: Momoko Abe, Japan

Miss Universe 2017 was the 66th Miss Universe pageant, held at The AXIS in Las Vegas, Nevada, United States, on 26 November 2017.

At the end of the event, Iris Mittenaere of France crowned Demi-Leigh Nel-Peters of South Africa as Miss Universe 2017. It was South Africa's first victory in almost four decades, and the second victory of the country in the pageant's history.

Contestants from ninety-two countries and territories competed in this year's pageant, surpassing the previous record of eighty-nine contestants in 2011 and 2012. The pageant was hosted by Steve Harvey in his third consecutive year, and supermodel Ashley Graham. Television personality Carson Kressley and runway coach Lu Sierra provided commentary and analysis throughout the event. American singer-songwriters Fergie and Rachel Platten performed in this year's pageant.

The competition also featured the return of the Phoenix Mikimoto crown, which was last used in 2007, after WME/IMG reportedly sued the Diamond International Company due to a breach of contract in August 2017. After failing to make payments, IMG canceled the contract with DIC.

== Background ==
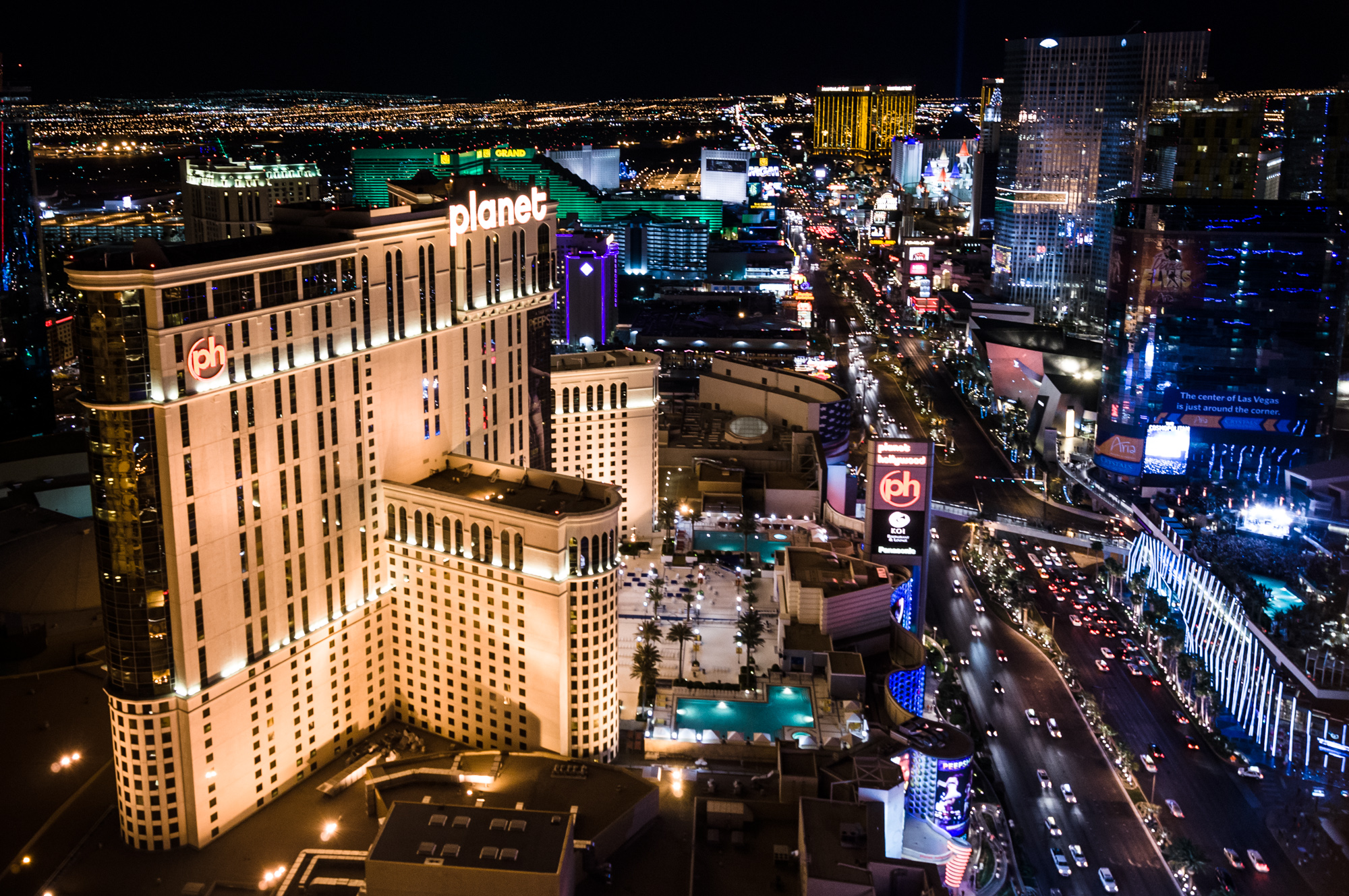
Planet Hollywood Resort and Casino the venue for Miss Universe 2017.

=== Location and date ===
Miss Universe Australia organization's Troy Barbagallo, Australian businessman, informed the Herald Sun that he submitted an offer to IMG for Australia to host the 2017 edition, with Sydney or Melbourne as viable host cities.

The Department of Tourism of the Philippines announced on 25 May 2017, that the Miss Universe Organization had proposed to hold the contest again in the Philippines. The Miss Universe 2016 pageant took place in the nation. The Miss Universe Organization was pleased with the previous pageant's hosting in the Philippines, stating it dominated the pre-events of Super Bowl LI. On 22 June 2017, the Department of Tourism decided that they will not host the pageant this year and instead consider hosting the following edition.

On 28 September 2017, the Miss Universe Organization confirmed the date and location of the contest through Instagram. The pageant will take place in The AXIS theatre of Planet Hollywood in Las Vegas, Nevada on 26 November 2017. The last time that The AXIS theatre was used by the pageant was in 2015.

=== Selection of participants ===
Contestants from ninety-two countries and territories were selected to compete in the pageant. Fourteen of these delegates were appointees to their titles after being a runner-up of their national pageant or an audition process or other internal selection, while three were selected to replace the original dethroned winner.

Liesbeth Claus, the third runner-up of Miss Belgium 2017, was appointed to represent Belgium after Romanie Schotte, Miss Belgium 2017, chose to compete at Miss World 2017 due to conflicting schedules of the two pageants. Kseniya Alexandrova, the first runner-up of Miss Russia 2017, was also appointed to represent Russia after Polina Popova, Miss Russia 2017, chose to compete at Miss World 2017. Katarzyna Włodarek, the second runner-up of Miss Polonia 2016, was appointed to represent Poland after the Miss Polonia pageant was postponed to late November following the Miss Universe pageant.

Mira Simeonova, Miss Universe Bulgaria 2017, originally was supposed to represent Bulgaria at Miss Universe. However, Simeonova did not meet the minimum age requirements of the pageant. Due to this, Nikoleta Todorova, a finalist at Miss Universe Bulgaria 2017, replaced Simeonova as Miss Universe Bulgaria 2017. Vian Sulaimani was supposed to represent Iraq at Miss Universe. However, Sulaimani was dethroned after it was discovered that she was married. Following Sulaimani's dethronement, the Miss Iraq Organization held a casting call to select the new representative of Iraq to Miss Universe. Sarah Idan emerged as the new Miss Iraq 2017. Pınar Tartan, Miss Turkey Supranational 2017, replaced Aslı Sümen as Miss Universe 2017 after Sümen replaced Itır Esen as Miss Turkey World 2017 hours after her crowning because of a tweet about the 2016 Turkish coup d'état attempt.

The 2017 edition saw the debuts of Cambodia, Laos, and Nepal and the returns of Egypt, El Salvador, Ethiopia, Ghana, Iraq, Ireland, Lebanon, Saint Lucia, Trinidad and Tobago, and Zambia. Iraq last competed in 1972, which makes the country's first time to compete after four decades of withdrawing from Miss Universe. Zambia last competed in 2010, Egypt, Ethiopia, Saint Lucia, and Trinidad and Tobago last competed in 2014, while the others last competed in 2015. Belize, Denmark, Hungary, Kenya, Kosovo, Sierra Leone, and Switzerland withdrew. Sierra Leone withdrew from the competition after Adama Kargbo was unable to secure a visa in time for the competition in the United States. Belize, Denmark, Hungary, Kenya, Kosovo, and Switzerland withdrew after their respective organizations failed to hold a national competition or appoint a delegate.

== Results ==
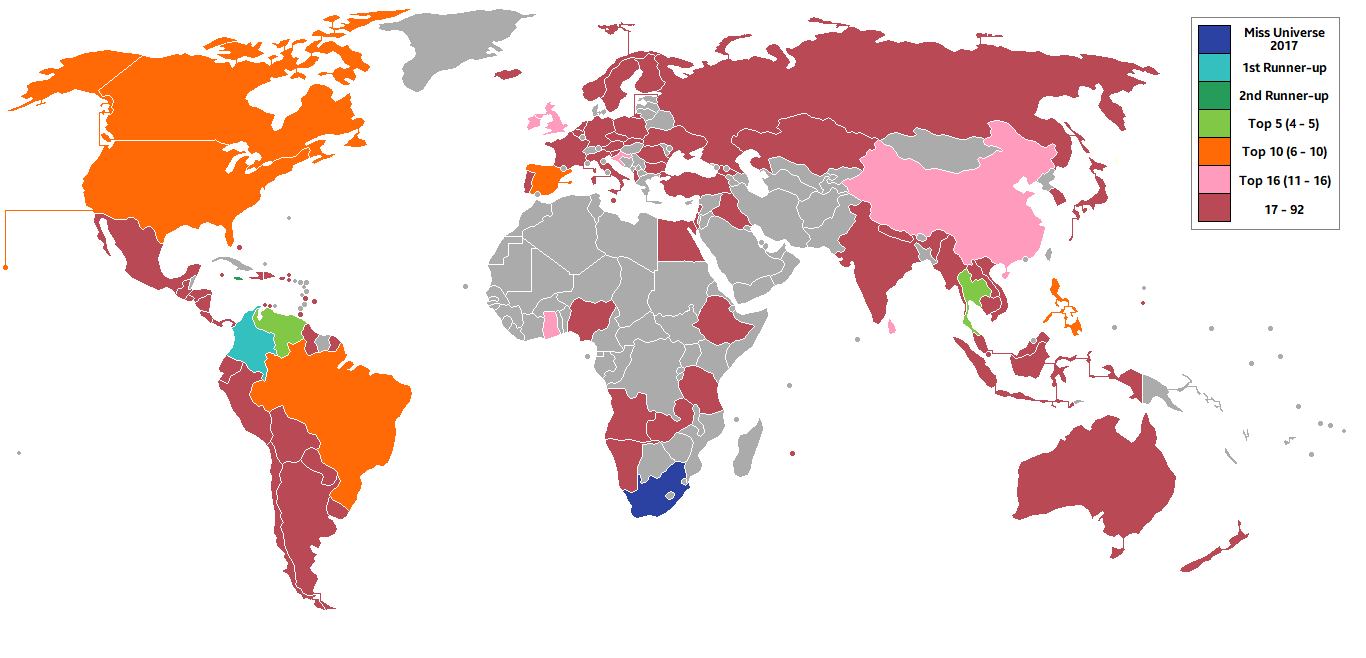
Miss Universe 2017 participating countries and territories.

=== Placements ===
Placement	Contestant
Miss Universe 2017	South Africa – Demi-Leigh Nel-Peters
1st Runner-Up	Colombia – Laura González
2nd Runner-Up	Jamaica – Davina Bennett
Top 5	Thailand – Maria Poonlertlarp; Venezuela – Keysi Sayago
Top 10	Brazil – Monalysa Alcântara; Canada – Lauren Howe; Philippines – Rachel Peters; Spain – Sofía del Prado; United States – Kára McCullough
Top 16	China – Roxette Qiu; Croatia – Shanaelle Petty; Ghana – Ruth Quarshie; Great Britain – Anna Burdzy; Ireland – Cailín Toibín; Sri Lanka – Christina Peiris

=== Special awards ===
Award	Contestant
Best National Costume	Japan – Momoko Abe
Miss Congeniality	Egypt – Farah Sedky; Panama – Laura de Sanctis

== Pageant ==
=== Format ===
The number of semifinalists was increased from thirteen in 2016 to sixteen. For the first time in this edition, contestants were divided into three geographical regions: The Americas, Europe, and Africa & Asia-Pacific. The judges chose the top four contestants from each of the three regions, as well as four other contestants from any region to complete the sixteen semifinalists. The sixteen semifinalists participated in the swimsuit competition, with ten advancing in the competition for the evening gown competition. Five finalists advanced to compete in the question and answer portion, while three finalists advanced to compete in the final question and the final walk.

=== Selection committee ===
==== Preliminary competition ====
- Cecilio Asuncion – Slay Models director and founder
- Morgan Deane – Tao Asian Bistro marketing director
- Wendy Fitzwilliam – Miss Universe 1998 from Trinidad and Tobago
- Isabelle Lindblom – IMG Models scout
- Megan Olivi – Fox Sports 1 host and reporter
- Bill Pereira – CEO, president, and co-chairman of IDT Telecom

==== Final telecast ====
- Wendy Fitzwilliam – Miss Universe 1998 from Trinidad and Tobago
- Jay Manuel – television host, creative director, and makeup artist
- Farouk Shami - businessman, owner of Farouk Systems
- Ross Mathews – television personality
- Megan Olivi – Fox Sports 1 host and reporter
- Lele Pons – Vine and YouTube personality
- Pia Wurtzbach – Miss Universe 2015 from the Philippines

== Contestants ==
Ninety-two contestants competed for the title.

Country/Territory	Candidate	Age (Note: Ages at the time of the pageant)	Hometown	Continental Group
Albania	Blerta Leka	19	Tirana	Europe
Angola	Lauriela Martins	19	Cabinda	Africa & Asia Pacific
Argentina	Stefanía Incandela	23	Buenos Aires	Americas
Aruba	Alina Mansur	26	Malmok	Americas
Australia	Olivia Rogers	25	Adelaide	Africa & Asia Pacific
Austria	Celine Schrenk	19	Gänserndorf	Europe
(The Bahamas) Bahamas	Yasmine Cooke	25	Nassau	Americas
Barbados	Lesley Chapman	26	Bridgetown	Americas
Belgium	Liesbeth Claus	20	Assenede	Europe
Bolivia	Gleisy Noguer	21	Cobija	Americas
Brazil	Monalysa Alcântara	18	Teresina	Americas
British Virgin Islands	Khephra Sylvester	25	Tortola	Americas
Bulgaria	Nikoleta Todorova	19	Vratsa	Europe
Cambodia	Sotheary By	19	Phnom Penh	Africa & Asia Pacific
Canada	Lauren Howe	24	Toronto	Americas
Cayman Islands	Anika Conolly	27	West Bay	Americas
Chile	Natividad Leiva	25	Santiago	Americas
China	Roxette Qiu	27	Chengdu	Africa & Asia Pacific
Colombia	Laura González	22	Cartagena	Americas
Costa Rica	Elena Correa	27	Heredia	Americas
Croatia	Shanaelle Petty	19	Slavonski Brod	Europe
Curaçao	Nashaira Balentien	20	Willemstad	Americas
Czech Republic	Michaela Habáňová	21	Zlín	Europe
Dominican Republic	Carmen Muñoz	24	Licey al Medio	Americas
Ecuador	Daniela Cepeda	22	Guayaquil	Americas
Egypt	Farah Sedky	23	Cairo	Africa & Asia Pacific
El Salvador	Alisson Abarca	21	San Salvador	Americas
Ethiopia	Akinahom Zergaw	22	Addis Ababa	Africa & Asia Pacific
Finland	Michaela Söderholm	25	Helsinki	Europe
France	Alicia Aylies	19	Paris	Europe
(Georgia (country)) Georgia	Marita Gogodze	21	Rustavi	Europe
Germany	Sophia Koch	20	Halle	Europe
Ghana	Ruth Quarshie	23	Ajumako	Africa & Asia Pacific
(United Kingdom) Great Britain	Anna Burdzy	25	Leicester	Europe
Guam	Myana Welch	27	Tamuning	Africa & Asia Pacific
Guatemala	Isel Suñiga	23	Ayutla	Americas
Guyana	Rafieya Husain	25	Anna Regina	Americas
Haiti	Cassandra Chéry	22	Port-au-Prince	Americas
Honduras	April Tobie	18	Roatán	Americas
Iceland	Arna Jónsdóttir	22	Kópavogur	Europe
India	Shraddha Shashidhar	21	Chennai	Africa & Asia Pacific
Indonesia	Bunga Jelitha Ibrani	26	Jakarta	Africa & Asia Pacific
Iraq	Sarah Idan	27	Baghdad	Africa & Asia Pacific
Ireland	Cailín Toibín	23	Cobh	Europe
Israel	Adar Gandelsman	19	Ashkelon	Africa & Asia Pacific
Italy	Maria Polverino	25	Naples	Europe
Jamaica	Davina Bennett	21	Clarendon	Americas
Japan	Momoko Abe	23	Chiba	Africa & Asia Pacific
Kazakhstan	Kamilla Asylova	19	Almaty	Africa & Asia Pacific
Laos	Souphaphone Somvichith	20	Champasak	Africa & Asia Pacific
Lebanon	Jana Sader	20	Sidon	Africa & Asia Pacific
Malaysia	Samantha James	23	Kuala Lumpur	Africa & Asia Pacific
Malta	Tiffany Pisani	25	Attard	Europe
Mauritius	Angie Callychurn	27	Curepipe	Africa & Asia Pacific
Mexico	Denisse Franco	19	Culiacán	Americas
Myanmar	Zun Than Sin	22	Yangon	Africa & Asia Pacific
Namibia	Suné January	23	Rehoboth	Africa & Asia Pacific
Nepal	Nagma Shrestha	26	Kathmandu	Africa & Asia Pacific
Netherlands	Nicky Opheij	22	Handel	Europe
New Zealand	Harlem Atarangi Ihaia	19	Napier	Africa & Asia Pacific
Nicaragua	Berenice Quezada	24	El Rama	Americas
Nigeria	Stephanie Agbasi	22	Neni	Africa & Asia Pacific
Norway	Kaja Kojan	20	Kongsvinger	Europe
Panama	Laura de Sanctis	21	Panama City	Americas
Paraguay	Ariela Machado	25	Asunción	Americas
Peru	Prissila Howard	26	Piura	Americas
Philippines	Rachel Peters	26	Canaman	Africa & Asia Pacific
Poland	Katarzyna Włodarek	26	Wrocław	Europe
Portugal	Matilde Lima	18	Setúbal	Europe
Puerto Rico	Danna Hernández	21	San Juan	Americas
Romania	Ioana Mihalache	26	Constanța	Europe
Russia	Kseniya Alexandrova	22	Moscow	Europe
Saint Lucia	Louise Victor	26	Micoud	Americas
Singapore	Manuela Bruntraeger	24	Singapore	Africa & Asia Pacific
Slovakia	Vanessa Bottánová	19	Bratislava	Europe
Slovenia	Emina Ekić	22	Ptuj	Europe
South Africa	Demi-Leigh Nel-Peters	22	Sedgefield	Africa & Asia Pacific
South Korea	Se-whee Cho	26	Seoul	Africa & Asia Pacific
Spain	Sofía del Prado	22	Albacete	Europe
Sri Lanka	Christina Peiris	23	Colombo	Africa & Asia Pacific
Sweden	Frida Fornander	22	Gothenburg	Europe
Tanzania	Lilian Maraule	22	Dar es Salaam	Africa & Asia Pacific
Thailand	Maria Poonlertlarp	25	Bangkok	Africa & Asia Pacific
Trinidad and Tobago	Yvonne Clarke	27	San Fernando	Americas
Turkey	Pınar Tartan	20	İzmir	Europe
Ukraine	Yana Krasnikova	18	Kyiv	Europe
United States	Kára McCullough	26	Washington, D.C.	Americas
United States Virgin Islands	Esonica Veira	27	Charlotte Amalie	Americas
Uruguay	Marisol Acosta	20	Canelones	Americas
Venezuela	Keysi Sayago	24	Caracas	Americas
Vietnam	Loan Nguyễn	27	Thái Bình	Africa & Asia Pacific
Zambia	Isabel Chikoti	26	Chingola	Africa & Asia Pacific
