= Pınar Tartan =

Turkish beauty pageant winners

- Born: 26 March 1997 (age 29); İzmir, Turkey
- Height: 6 ft 0 in (183 cm)
- Beauty pageant titleholder
- Title: Miss Turkey Universe 2017
- Hair color: Brown
- Eye color: Dark Brown
- Major competitions: Miss Turkey Universe 2017 (Winner); Miss Universe 2017 (Unplaced)

Pınar Tartan (born 26 March 1997) is a Turkish model and beauty pageant titleholder who won Miss Turkey Universe 2017 and represented Turkey at the Miss Universe 2017 pageant.

In December 2018, she was named Miss Model of the World.

Awards and achievements
Preceded by Tansu Sila Çakir	Miss Turkey; 2017	Succeeded by Tara De Vries
