= Naim Dangoor =

British-Iraqi entrepreneur and philanthropist (1914–2015)

Sir Naim Dangoor
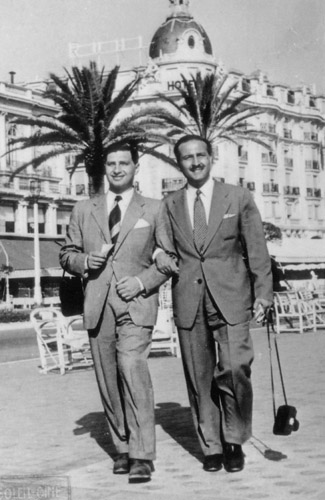
- Naim Dangoor (left) with his friend Ahmed Safwat in the 1940s
- Born: 17 April 1914; Baghdad, Ottoman Empire
- Died: 19 November 2015 (aged 101); London, United Kingdom
- Education: University of London
- Occupation: Businessman
- Known for: Philanthropy
- Spouse: Renée Dangoor (1947–2008)
- Children: David Dangoor and three other sons
- Parent: Eliahou Dangoor
- Relatives: Hakham Ezra Reuben Dangoor (grandfather)

Sir Naim Eliahou Dangoor, CBE (Arabic: نعيم إلياهو دنكور; 17 April 1914 – 19 November 2015) was a British-Iraqi entrepreneur and philanthropist known for his business ventures.

== Early life ==
Dangoor was born in Baghdad in 1914, the second of six siblings. His father, Eliahou Dangoor (1883–1976), was the world's largest printer of Arabic books, and his grandfather Hakham Ezra Reuben Dangoor was the Chief Rabbi of Baghdad.

In the 1930s, Dangoor made the five-day journey from Baghdad to London, at the age of 17, in order to enroll in an engineering degree at the University of London. After graduating he returned to Iraq where he was conscripted into the army and became an officer. It was during his army training that he met his future business partner Ahmed Safwat.

== Career ==
Initially on leaving the army he had hoped to become an engineer on the railways, but due to restrictions imposed upon Jews this was not possible, so he and Ahmed, a Muslim, decided to go into business together, setting up Eastern Industries in 1949.

Their first contract was to supply new windows to all Iraqi government buildings, and soon their portfolio grew to include property development and letting. In 1950, Eastern industries secured the first contract to bottle Coca-Cola in Iraq. Alongside Eastern Industries, Dangoor also ran factories producing matches and furniture.

With the founding of the State of Israel and the resulting conflict between Israel and the Arab states, the situation for Jews in the country worsened and in 1959 Dangoor took the difficult decision to take his family out. He continued travelling back and forth for business until 1963, when he decided that the worsening political situation made it too risky for him to return. As a result of laws specific to Jews, he lost his Iraqi citizenship, and his property and business interests were taken by the government. He was eventually permitted to settle in the UK where he set about rebuilding his life, setting up a property business that his four sons went on to join.

== Personal life ==
In November 1947, Dangoor married his cousin, Renée Dangoor (who had been crowned Miss Iraq earlier that year). They went on to have four sons.

== Philanthropy ==
In order to preserve the heritage of the community he had left behind, soon after settling in the UK, he founded a community centre in West Kensington for new Iraqi Jewish immigrants, and in 1971 began editing and publishing The Scribe – Journal of Babylonian Jewry, with 4000 subscribers in 25 countries which continued to be published for 35 years.

In 1970, he revived the title of Exilarch – an ancient title held by the supreme leader of all the Jewish communities in Babylonia, up until the 13th century.

During the sanctions on Iraq, Dangoor donated a significant amount to needy people in the country.

In 2003, he demanded £12 billion ($20 billion) from Iraq's leaders as compensation for what the Iraqi-Jewish community had lost in Iraq after the Second World War.

As his business in the UK grew, he wanted to give back to the country that had taken him in. In 1980 he set up the Exilarch's Foundation, a charity that has made numerous donations to causes relating to education and health.

In 2004, he created the Dangoor Scholarships to help one thousand undergraduate students who had no family history of further education, at the 1994 Group of universities.

In 2008 Dangoor initiated "The Sir Naim Dangoor Program for Universal Monotheism" at Bar Ilan University.The main goal of the program was to cultivate real peace and understanding through truth, ethics, and action of the broad common ground shared by the major monotheistic religions: Judaism, Christianity and Islam. Later, the program’s goal expended and were defined as to open horizons to learn more about other religions, and to serve as a bridge to East Asian beliefs and traditions. After 10 fruitful years of activity the program developed into a cultural diplomacy and educational center: "The Sir Naim Dangoor Centre for Universal monotheism". The Dangoor Centre (מרכז דנגור) is the direct continuation of the Dangoor Program which was active from 2008-2018. The Centre began its official activities during the 2019 academic school year at Bar-Ilan University.

The primary aim of the Sir Naim Dangoor Centre for Universal Monotheism (מרכז דת-עולם ע”ש סר נעים דנגור) is to return the humanities to its place as a connector between worlds and to act as an intercultural mediator. The centre's operations focus on innovation, publication, development and distribution of knowledge and insights on issues of universal cultural interest, based on tolerance, mutual respect, and a comprehensive and respectful intellectual worldview. It operates as an inter-religious and inter-cultural mediator in a variety of fields of knowledge and interest shared by all peoples and cultures, heritages and traditions from the West and East.

In 2009, he created the Eliahou Dangoor Scholarships, in honour of his father. These were awarded to four thousand undergraduate students, with limited means, studying STEM (science, technology, engineering and maths) subjects.

In the same year Dangoor was made honorary President for the Association of Jewish Academics from Iraq.

The Exilarch's Foundation also sponsors the Westminster Academy in West London, whose pupils hail from over 60 countries, many in the Middle East. Dangoor's family have been closely involved with the running of the school and have seen it go from being issued with an Ofsted 'Notice to Improve' in 2009, to being rated as 'Outstanding' in 2013. Since the Academy opened the number of students achieving five A*-C GCSE grades including both English and Maths has increased from 17% to 70% in 2014.

Dangoor also donated a significant amount to Cancer Research UK to support their website, in memory of his late wife Renée, who died from breast cancer in 2008.

At Bar-Ilan University in Israel, Dangoor set up the Dangoor Centre for Personalised Medicine in the Galilee, which partners with hospitals to analyse the genetic makeup of individual patients, enabling doctors to implement the most effective treatments.

In 2014 he made the largest gift to the Royal Society of Medicine in its history. The donation is being used to help support young people from disadvantaged backgrounds who would like to pursue a career in medicine, as well as supporting the society's post-graduate education provision.

Dangoor was also the largest private individual donor to the Francis Crick Institute in London, Europe's largest biomedical research centre.

Dangoor Walk, a pathway that runs beside the Francis Crick Institute and links Midland Road with Ossulston Street, is named after him.

Through his foundation Dangoor promoted the idea of 'Universal Monotheism' a concept that he believes can bring about unity and create a framework for a global religious ethic. He has sponsored the setting up of a Centre for Universal Monotheism at Bar-Ilan University from which he received an honorary doctorate in 2006.

He made contributions to the University of Nanjing in China, and had a particular interest in China because his late wife Renée was born and grew up in Shanghai. In Nanjing he funded scholarships for the university's Jewish Studies Institute and sponsored an international symposium on monotheism, attended by delegates from all over China, the US, Australia and Israel. In 2011 he was made a consultant professor of the University of Nanjing in recognition of his contributions.

== Honours ==
He was appointed OBE in 2006, and CBE in the 2012 New Year Honours List, and was made a Knight Bachelor in the Queen's 2015 Birthday Honours list. He became the second-oldest person to be knighted, and the oldest to be knighted for the first time – Robert Mayer was 101 when he was made a Knight Commander of the Royal Victorian Order, but he had already been made a Knight Bachelor at the age of 60.

In 2012, Dangoor was made a fellow of Birkbeck College, part of the University of London. This was in addition to his honorary fellowship of the Royal Albert Hall of Arts and Sciences, awarded in 2007.

In April 2015, to mark his 101st birthday, Coca-Cola published a piece on the first Coca-Cola bottler of Iraq sharing a centenary with the iconic Coca-Cola bottle.
