= Miss Aruba 2018 =

- Date: June 7, 2018
- Venue: Alhambra Ballroom, Divi Resorts, Oranjestad, Aruba
- Entrants: 4

The Miss Aruba 2018 the 51st edition of the Miss Aruba pageant was held in Alhambra Ballroom, Divi Resorts in Oranjestad, Aruba. Alina Mansur crowned her successor at the end of the event. 4 contestants from the islands in Aruba competed. The winner represented Aruba in Miss Universe 2018 and Miss World 2018 pageant.

== Placements ==
Final results	Contestant
Miss Aruba - Universe 2018	Kimberly Julsing
Miss Aruba - World 2018	Nurianne Arias Helder
Miss Aruba - Hispanoamericana 2018	Raquelle Reeberg
Miss Aruba - Internacional del Café 2018	Hannah Arends

== Contestants ==
The official Top 4 finalists of The Next Miss Aruba 2018.

No.	Contestant	Age	Height	Hometown
1	Hannah Arends	21	1.75 cm	Savaneta
2	Nurianne Arias Helder	23	1.65 cm	Oranjestad
3	Kimberly Julsing	20	1.82 cm	Oranjestad
4	Raquelle Reeberg	25	1.75 cm	Oranjestad
