= Ruth Quarshie =

Ghanaian model

Ruth Quarshie is a Ghanaian model and beauty pageant titleholder, winner of the 2017 Miss Universe Ghana. She represented Ghana at the Miss Universe 2017 in the United States and ended up as one of the top 16 finalists.

== Education ==
She is a graduate of the University of Ghana Business School.
