= Maria Farhad =

Iraqi model (born 2001)

- Born: Maria Farhad; 2001 (age 24–25); Qaraqosh, Iraq
- Height: 1.70 m (5 ft 7 in)
- Beauty pageant titleholder
- Title: Miss Iraq 2021
- Hair color: Brown
- Eye color: Brown
- Major competitions: Miss Iraq 2021 (Winner); Miss World 2022 (Unplaced)

Maria Farhad (Arabic: ماريا فرهاد, born 2001) is an Iraqi model and beauty pageant titleholder who was named Miss Iraq 2021. She represented Iraq at the Miss World 2022 pageant in Puerto Rico.

== Early life ==
Farhad was born to an ethnic Assyrian family in Qaraqosh, located in the Nineveh Governorate, northern Iraq. Farhad is studying computer science at the University of Mosul. Farhad relocated to Erbil in the wake of the Islamic State attacks in 2014.

== Pageantry ==
Farhad was named Miss Iraq 2021 at a pageant held in Erbil and sponsored by the Iraqi Culture Ministry and broadcast on Al Rasheed TV.

Although the Miss Iraq organization held a contest to send its representative to Miss Universe, it participated in Miss World 2021 instead since the Miss Universe 2021 contest venue was Israel.

== See also ==
Iraqi beauty pageants
