= Miss Aruba =

Beauty pageant

Miss Aruba Foundation
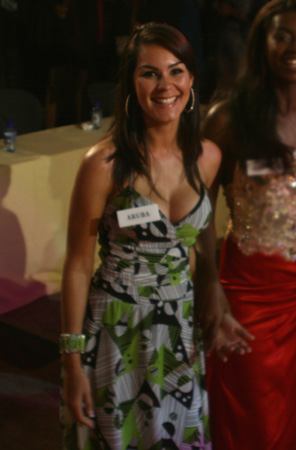
- Formation: 1964; 62 years ago
- Type: Beauty pageant
- Headquarters: Oranjestad
- Location: Aruba
- Members: Miss Universe
- Official language: Dutch; English; Papiamento
- Company: Star Promotion Foundation

The Miss Aruba is a national beauty pageant in Aruba. The pageant was founded in 1964, where the winners were sent to Miss Universe.

== History ==
Under the direction of the New Star Promotion Organization since 1992, Aruba has been accumulating positive results, with Taryn Mansell placing as first runner-up in 1996 at Miss Universe and Tamara Scaroni, becoming the first Aruban to receive the Miss Congeniality award in 2000; representatives placing as semifinalists in 1990, 1996, 2002, along with a first runner-up in 2001 at Miss World; and another semifinalist in Miss International 2001, three Best National Costume awards in 2000, 2007, 2008 and a first runner-up placement in 1994 at Miss International. In 2011, the New Star Promotion acquired the franchise for Miss Earth.

=== National directors ===
- Government of Tourism and Culture Aruba (1964―1991)
- Star Promotion (1992―present)

== Titleholders ==
Year	Miss Aruba
1963	Lidia Lidwina Henriquez
1964	Dorinda Croes
1965	Sandra Fang
1966	Ivonne Maduro
1967	Sandra Croes
1968	Jeanette Geerman
1969	Linda Annette Richmon
1970	Vicenta Vallita Maduro
1971	Ivonne Dirksz
1972	Monica Ethline Oduber
1973	Maureen Ava Vieira
1974	Martica Pamela Brown
1975	Cynthia Marlene Bruin
1976	Margaret Eldrid Oduber
1977	Margarita Marieta Tromp
1978	Lugina Liliana Margareta Vilchez
1979	Magaly Celestina Maduro
1980	Synia Reyes
1981	Noriza Antonio Helder
1982	Milva Evertz
1983	Jacqueline Deborah van Putten
1984	Margaret Jane Bislick
1985	Mildred Jacqueline Semeleer
1987	Melva Sanon
1989	Karina Felix
1990	Gwendolyne Charlotte Kwidama
1991	Yerusha Rasmijn
1992	Dyane Escalona
1993	Alexandra Ochoa Hincapie
1994	Marie-Denise Herrlein
1995	Taryn Mansell
1996	Karen-Ann Peterson
1997	Wendy Lacle
1998	Irina Croes
1999	Tamara Scaroni
2000	Denise Balinge
2001	Deyanira Ludwina Frank
2002	Malayka Rasmijn
2003	Fatima Salie
2004	Luisana Cicilia
2005	Melissa Vanessa Laclé
2006	Carolina Raven
2007	Tracey Nicolaas
2008	Dianne Croes
2009	Priscilla Lee
2010	Gillain Berry
2011	Lucianette Verhoeks
2012	Liza Helder
2013	Stefanie Evangelista
2014	Digene Zimmerman
2015	Alysha Boekhoudt
2016	Charlene Leslie
2017	Alina Mansur
2018	Kimberly Julsing
2019	Danna Garcia
2020	Helen Hernandez
2021	Thessaly Zimmerman
2022	Kiara Arends
2023	Karol Croes
2024	Anouk Eman

== Titleholders under Miss Aruba Foundation ==
=== Miss Aruba Universe ===
- : Declared as Winner
- : Ended as runner-up or top 5/6 qualification
- : Ended as one of the finalists or semifinalists
- : Ended as special awards winner

The Miss Aruba winner usually represents the island at Miss Universe. In 2012 the Aruban representative was selected in a separate casting "Miss Universe Aruba", and began 2013 the main Miss Aruba titleholder was recompeting at the pageant. On occasion, when the winner does not qualify (due to age) for either contest, a runner-up is sent.

Year	Miss Aruba	Placement at Miss Universe	Special Awards	Notes
2026	Elizabeth Johnson	TBA
2025	Hannah Arends	Unplaced
2024	Anouk Eman	Top 30
2023	Karol Croes	Unplaced
2022	Kiara Arends	Unplaced
2021	Thessaly Zimmerman	Top 10
2020	Helen Hernandez	Unplaced
2019	Danna Melissa García Cardenas	Unplaced
2018	Kimberly Orline Julsing	Unplaced
2017	Alina Danelle Mansur	Unplaced
2016	Charlene Leslie	Unplaced
2015	Alyenne Alysha Edith Boekhoudt	Unplaced
2014	Digene Marilyn Zimmerman	Unplaced
2013	Stefanie Guillen Evangelista	Unplaced
2012	Liza Nerelyn Helder	Unplaced		Appointed — Designation as Miss Universe Aruba 2012 after the annual Miss Aruba postponed and a private casting of Miss Universe Aruba held.
2011	Gillain Alicia Berry	Unplaced
2010	Priscilla Nicole Wai-Yien Lee	Unplaced
2009	Angene Dianne Shanella Croes	Unplaced
2008	Tracey Marion Jeniree Nicolaas	Unplaced
2007	Carolina Raven Pérez	Unplaced
2006	Melissa Vanessa Laclé	Unplaced
2005	Luisana Cicilia	Unplaced
2004	Zerelda "Zizi" Candice Wai-Yen Lee	Unplaced
2003	Malayka Rasmijn	Unplaced
2002	Deyanira Ludwina Frank	Unplaced
2001	Denise Balinge	Unplaced
2000	Tamara Scaroni	Unplaced	Miss Congeniality
1999	Irina Croes	Unplaced
1998	Wendy Lacle	Unplaced
1997	Karen-Ann Peterson	Unplaced
1996	Taryn Scheryl Mansell	1st Runner-up
1995	Marie-Denise Herrlein	Unplaced
1994	Alexandra Ochoa Hincapié	Unplaced
1993	Dyane Escalona	Unplaced
1992	Yerusha Rasmijn	Unplaced
1991	Did not compete
1990	Gwendolyne Charlotte Kwidama	Unplaced
1989	Karina Felix	Unplaced
Did not compete between 1987—1988
1986	Mildred Jacqueline Semeleer	Unplaced
1985	Margaret Jane Bislick	Did not compete
1984	Jacqueline Deborah van Putten	Unplaced
1983	Milva Evertz	Unplaced
1982	Noriza Antonio Helder	Unplaced
1981	Synia Reyes	Unplaced
1980	Magaly Celestina Maduro	Unplaced
1979	Lugina Liliana Margareta Vilchez	Unplaced
1978	Margarita Marieta Tromp	Unplaced	Miss Press
1977	Margaret Eldrid Oduber	Unplaced
1976	Cynthia Marlene Bruin	Unplaced
1975	Martica Pamela Brown	Unplaced
1974	Maureen Ava Vieira	4th Runner-up
1973	Monica Ethline Oduber	Unplaced
1972	Ivonne Dirksz	Unplaced
1971	Vicenta Vallita Maduro	Unplaced
1970	Linda Annette Richmon	Unplaced
1969	Jeanette Geerman	Unplaced
1968	Sandra Croes	Unplaced
1967	Ivonne Maduro	Unplaced
1966	Sandra Fang	Unplaced
1965	Dorinda Croes	Unplaced
1964	Lidia Lidwina Henriquez	Unplaced

=== Miss Aruba World ===
- : Declared as Winner
- : Ended as runner-up or top 5/6 qualification
- : Ended as one of the finalists or semifinalists
- : Ended as special awards winner

The runner-up of Miss Aruba previously competed at Miss World pageant. In some years the main Miss Aruba could compete at Miss World. On occasion, when the position does not qualify (due to age) for either contest, another contestant is sent. 2019 was the last Aruba competed at the pageant. Since then, there has been no update about Miss World representation from Aruba at the pageant.

Year	Miss Aruba World	Placement at Miss World	Special Awards	Notes
Did not compete since 2020—present
2019	Ghislaine Mejia	Unplaced	Miss World Sport (Top 32)	
2018	Nurianne Arias	Unplaced		
2017	Anouk Eman	Unplaced		
2016	Lynette do Nascimento	Unplaced	Miss World Sport (Top 24)	
2015	Nicole Van Tellingen	Unplaced		
2014	Joitza Henriquez	Unplaced		
2013	Larisa Leeuwe	Top 20	Beauty With a Purpose (Top 10); Miss World Sport (Top 20); Miss World Beach Beauty (Top 33)	
2012	Lucianette Verhoeks	Unplaced		
2011	Gillain Alicia Berry	Unplaced	Miss World Beach Beauty (Top 36)	
2010	Kimberly del Valle Kuiperi	Unplaced		
2009	Nuraisa Lispier	Unplaced		
2008	Christina Trejo	Unplaced		
2007	Boyoura Martijn	Unplaced		
2006	Shanandoa Wijshijer	Unplaced		
2005	Sarah Carolina Juddan	Unplaced		
2004	Luisana Nikually Cicilia	Unplaced		
2003	Nathalie Biermanns	Unplaced		
2002	Rachelle Oduber	Top 20	Miss World Caribbean	
2001	Zerelda "Zizi" Candice Wai-Yen Lee	1st Runner-up	Miss World Caribbean	
2000	Monique Angelique van der Horn	Unplaced		
1999	Cindy Vanessa Cam Lin Martinus	Unplaced		
1998	Judelca Shahira Briceno	Unplaced		
1997	Michella Laclé Croes	Unplaced		
1996	Afranina Henriques	Top 10	Miss World Caribbean	
1995	Tessa Pieterz	Unplaced		
1994	Did not compete			
1993	Christina van der Berg	Unplaced		
1992	Solange Noelle Nicolaas	Unplaced		
1991	Sandra Croes	Unplaced		
1990	Gwendolyne Kwidama	Top 10		
1989	Delailah Odor-Wever	Unplaced		
Did not compete between 1986—1988
1985	Jacqueline Deborah van Putten	Unplaced		
1984	Margaret Jane Bislick	Unplaced		
1983	Audrey Bruges	Unplaced		
1982	Noriza Antonia Helder	Unplaced		
1981	Gerarda Hendrine Jantiene Reopel	Unplaced		
1980	Ethline Ambrosia Dekker	Unplaced		
1979	Vianca van Hoek	Unplaced		
1978	Rose Anne Marie Lejuez	Unplaced		
1977	Helene Marie Croes	Unplaced		
1976	Maureen Wever	Unplaced		
1975	Cynthia Marlene Bruin	Unplaced		
1974	Esther Angeli Luisa Marugg	Unplaced		
1973	Edwina Diaz	Unplaced		
1972	Sandra Werleman	Unplaced		
Did not compete between 1967—1970
1966	Reina Patricia Hernandez	Unplaced		
1965	Did not compete			
1964	Regina Croes	Unplaced		

== Past titleholders under Miss Aruba Foundation ==
=== Miss Aruba International ===
- : Declared as Winner
- : Ended as runner-up or top 5/6 qualification
- : Ended as one of the finalists or semifinalists
- : Ended as special awards winner

The third place of Miss Aruba was titled Miss Aruba International and went to Miss International until 2011. Began 2012 Aruban representative at Miss International beauty pageant will be selected at Señorita Aruba.

Year	Miss Aruba International	Placement at Miss International	Special Awards	Notes
2011	Vivian Chow	Unplaced	Goodwill Ambassador	
2010	Ivana Werleman	Unplaced		
2009	Christina Trejo	Unplaced		
2008	Nuraisa Lispier	Unplaced	Best National Costume	
2007	Jonella Oduber	Unplaced	Best National Costume	
2006	Luizanne "Zenny" Donata	Unplaced		
2005	Gita van Bochove	Unplaced		
2004	Ysaura Giel	Unplaced		
2003	Falon Juliana Lopez	Unplaced		
2002	Jerianne Tiel	Unplaced		
2001	Daphne Dione Croes	Top 15		
2000	Carolina Francisca Albertsz	Unplaced	Best National Costume	
1999	Cindy Vanessa Cam Lin Martinus	Unplaced		
1998	Anushka Sheritsa Lew Jen Tai	Unplaced		
1997	Louisette Mariela Vlinder	Unplaced		
1996	Julisa Marie Lampe	Unplaced		
1995	Yolanda Janssen	Unplaced		
1994	Alexandra Ochoa Hincapié	1st Runner-up		

=== Miss Grand Aruba ===
Aruba participated in Miss Grand International only once in 2016. Its representative, Chimay Ramos, obtained the national title after competing at the Miss Aruba 2016 pageant.

Year	Miss Aruba Grand International	Placement at Miss Grand International	Special Awards	Notes
2016	Chimay Ramos	Unplaced		

== See also ==
- Miss Aruba 2018
