= Tracey Nicolaas =

Aruban model

Tracey Marion Jeniree Nicolaas (born 1987) is an Aruban model and beauty pageant titleholder who won Miss Aruba 2007. The then 19-year-old Nicolaas was crowned at the Grand Ballroom, Westin Aruba Resort.

She represented her country at Miss Universe 2008.

Preceded by Carolina Raven	Miss Aruba; 2007–2008	Succeeded by Dianne Croes
