= Ezra Dangoor =

Chief Rabbi of Baghdad (1848–1930)

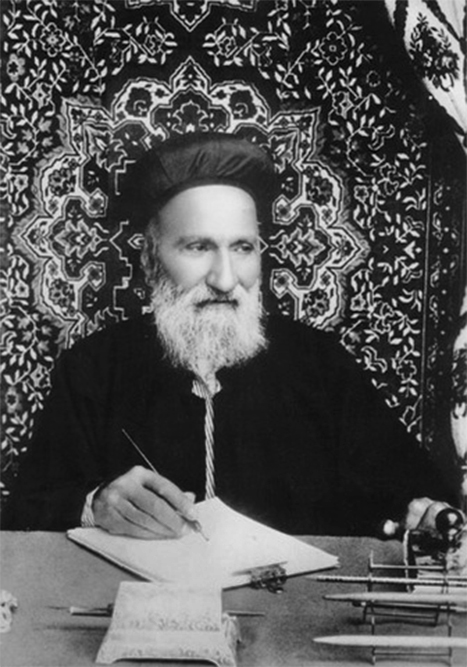
- Born: 1848; Baghdad, Ottoman Iraq
- Died: 1930 (aged 81–82)
- Occupation: Rabbi
- Children: Eliahou Dangoor
- Relatives: Sir Naim Eliahou Dangoor (grandson)

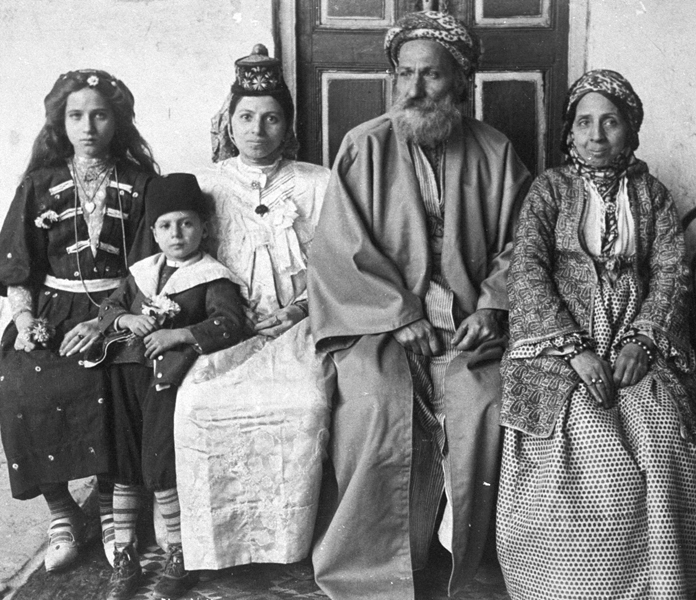
Ezra Dangoor and family, Baghdad, 1910

Hakham Ezra Reuben Dangoor (1848–1930) was the Chief Rabbi of Baghdad from 1923 to 1926, and the founder of one of the city's first publishing companies.

== Early life ==
Hakham Ezra Sasson Reuben Dangoor was born in 1848 in Baghdad, Iraq. At that time, the city was part of the Ottoman Empire, with a population of around 60,000 including around 16,000 Jews.

In his youth Dangoor studied under Hakham Abdallah Somekh at Beit Zilkha, the main rabbinical seminary in Baghdad. While Rabbi Abdallah Somekh did not hold any official position in the city’s Jewish community such as that of Chief Rabbi (Hakham Bashi) he was recognised as Baghdad’s greatest sage. Under his tutelage, Beit Zilkha developed into the principal Court of Appeal for all of the Jewish courts in Iraq and Kurdistan.

In 1866, at the age of 18, Dangoor married Habiba Gareh, with whom he would have four children: a daughter, Farah (1876-1973), and four sons named Sion (1871-1955), Abdullah Joseph (1873-1889), Eliahu (1883-1976) and Moshe (1888-1962). While married students at Beit Zilkha received a stipend to support their families, Dangoor is said to have turned down this support: instead studying half the day and working to support himself the other half of the day. He worked in a number of jobs including as a ritual slaughterer, circumciser, and bill writer during his early career.

== Career ==
In 1880 Dangoor was appointed as a scribe at Baghdad's Beth Din Rabbinical Court which served the city's Jewish community, overseeing matters including marriage and divorce, inheritance disputes, kosher supervision, commercial arbitration and communal religious governance.

In 1893 Dangoor was presented with the opportunity to leave Baghdad, and serve as Chief Rabbi to one of the Jewish mercantile communities established in Asia, in Rangoon, now Yangon, Myanmar. At the time it was under the control of the British Empire as part of British India. A community of Baghdadi Jews had emerged in Burma around 1850 and included merchants exporting rice, teak and cotton to the Middle East and India, linked with other mercantile communities in Asian cities including Bombay, Singapore, Shanghai, and Hong Kong.

Dangoor stayed in Rangoon for around two years before returning to Baghdad in 1895. His departure has been attributed to factors including ill health and tensions with communal leaders over questions of authority and religious practice.

In 1897, a couple of years after returning to Baghdad, Hakham Ezra Dangoor began managing the city's Great Synagogue which was located near Al-Rashid street, close to the Tigris River. He also administered several charities, often associated with the synagogue, collecting and distributing donations to the needy. Some of Hakham Ezta Dangoor's records of these activities are held at the British Library.

Around nine years after returning to Baghdad, in 1904, Dangoor opened a new enterprise: a printing press, one of the first in the city. Dangoor Printing Press mainly printed Arabic textbooks, with books also printed in Hebrew, using paper imported from Sweden.

The Dangoor Printing Press was reportedly the first printing press in Iraq to print the Qur’an. Other works printed included titles focused on Jewish history and traditions like the Scroll of the Prophet Daniel and his Companions (1912) and The Scroll of Persia (1912), in addition to a popular work about Maimonides (1913), the famed medieval Jewish philosopher and polymath. The Dangoor Printing Press also produced some periodicals including a short-lived Hebrew Weekly, Yeshu Run, which printed five editions in 1921.

Dangoor also authored a number of books and commentaries on the Torah, in addition to hymns and songs. A commentary written by Dangoor on Ecclesiastes survived in manuscript form and was later reprinted by Dangoor's grandson, Naim Dangoor, in London. His son, Eliahu, also worked alongside his father in the printing press, eventually took over its running and became a leading figure in the paper and printing machinery trade in Iraq, publishing the 1936 Official Directory of Iraq.

The establishment of the Dangoor Printing Press reflected wider processes of modernization that were transforming late Ottoman Iraq. Advances in communication, education, and commerce fostered the growth of print culture, enhancing connectivity between Baghdad and local, regional, and global networks. For Baghdad’s Jewish community, the press formed part of a broader engagement with modernity characterised by rising literary, educational reform, and increased participation in cultural life.

== From Ottoman to British rule ==
In 1917, Baghdad moved from Ottoman to British control during the First World War, following the advance of British and Indian forces into Mesopotamia. The change marked the beginning of a new period of British administration, and later, political influence in Iraq.

The British Mandate for Iraq was officially established by the League of Nations at the San Remo conference on 25 April 1920, and came into place in August 1921, with Faisal I of Iraq installed as King.

Within this context, Dangoor was appointed Chief Rabbi of Baghdad in 1923, six years after the British took control of the city, and two years after Faisal I became King. He held the position for three years until 1926. His tenure was marked by tensions and disputes within the Baghdad Jewish community, as a rising group of Western-educated professionals, merchants, and intellectuals challenged traditional rabbinic authority over communal governance. This process has been described by Joel Beinin, Professor of Middle East History at Stanford University:

“... By the late 1920s a whole new generation of Iraqi Jews, mostly graduates of the various Alliance schools, sought to install a chief rabbi (Hakham Bashi) and a communal leadership more receptive to modern concepts and mores. The only course open to these was to infiltrate the community’s institutions and work for change from within. They started with penetrating the community’s “lay council”, Al-Majlis Al-Jismani, leaving strictly religious matters to members of its so-called “Spiritual Council,” Al-Majlis Al-Ruhani. This they managed to do by working hard, throughout the 1920s, to have their members elected to the lay council – and by the early 1930s they had managed to secure the resignation of the conservative chief rabbi, Ezra Dangoor, replacing him with Rabbi Sasson Khedhouri as chief rabbi as well as president of the Spiritual Council.”

== Personal life ==
Hakham Ezra Dangoor had five children: Sion, Abdulla Joseph, Farha (who married Shaul Basri), Eliahou and Moshe.

== Death and legacy ==
Dangoor died in 1930, four years after stepping down as Chief Rabbi of Baghdad. He was 83 years-old. Obituary notices were published in several Baghdad newspapers at the time including Al-Bilad, Al-Iraq, Al-Alam Al-Arabi, and Al-Awqat Al-Baghdadiyya. Hakham Ezra Dangoor's grandson, Salim, was 11 at the time and gave a euology during the funeral:

“He was very popular and some ten thousand people went to the funeral. On the seventh day a big memorial service was held at Albert Sassoon Synagogue. Many dignitaries and a representative of the king were present. I was asked by the late Sasson Murad, a community notable in charge of the service, to read a eulogy which he wrote for me. I stood on a high-chair and I started reading the speech with tears in my eyes.

When I read the passage ‘Oh God, we are deprived of someone we loved dearly. Won’t you make a miracle to bring him back to life for at least one month?’ The ladies started crying and wailing loudly and the public joined. The speech was a big success and the following day it came out in all the newspapers that ‘the lad Salim, the grandson brought tears to all present with his moving words.’ With my picture published in the papers, I felt very proud.”

Hakham Ezra Dangoor was the grandfather of entreperneur and philanthropist Sir Naim Eliahou Dangoor (1914–2015), husband of Iraq's first beauty queen, Renée Dangoor, and also the great-grandfather of the philanthropist David Dangoor.
