= Ben Barkow =

British librarian (born 1956)

Ben Barkow, CBE (born 1956) is a writer and was the director of the Wiener Holocaust Library from 1998 to 2019.

Barkow was born in Berlin but lived in London from the age of four. He studied at the Middlesex Polytechnic and at University College London. After employment as a researcher at the Wellcome Institute for the History of Medicine, he started to work for the Wiener Library Institute of Contemporary History and is today its director. Also he is a member of the editorial advisory board of Jewish Renaissance magazine.

Barkow was appointed an Honorary Commander of the Order of the British Empire (CBE) for services to Holocaust Education and Remembrance in 2022.

== Publications ==
Barkow is the author or editor of these books:

- Alfred Wiener and the Making of the Holocaust Library (1997) (ISBN 0-85303-328-5)
- Testaments of the Holocaust, series 1 – 3 (editor) (1998–2000)
- Philipp Manes, Als ob’s ein Leben wär: Tatsachenbericht Theresienstadt 1942-1944 (editor with Klaus Leist) (2005)
- Novemberpogrom 1938: Die Augenzeugenberichte der Wiener Library, (with Raphel Gross and Michael Lenarz) London (2008)
- Philipp Manes, As Though it were a Life (with Klaus Leist, in preparation)
