= Miss Iraq 2017 =

- Date: May 25, 2017
- Presenters: Hamsa Maged Khazraji
- Entertainment: Rola Saad, Layal Abboud
- Venue: Babylon Warwick Hotel Baghdad, Iraq
- Broadcaster: NRT News
- Entrants: 15
- Placements: 8
- Winner: Vian Amer Noori Sulaimani; Miss Karkh - West Baghdad

Miss Iraq 2017, the third edition of Miss Iraq was held on May 25, 2017 in Baghdad. Vian Sulaimani from Sulaymaniyah representing Karkh region of Baghdad was crowned as Miss Iraq 2017.

== Results ==
Final results	Contestant
Miss Iraq 2017	Karkh (West Baghdad) – Vian Sulaimani (dethroned)
1st Runner-Up	Halabja-Hawraman – Masty Hama (successor)
2nd Runner-Up	Rusafa – Marina Roqan
3rd Runner-Up	Erbil – Sara Abduljabbar
Top 8	Baghdad Belt – Shahad Shaalan; Chavi Tourism City – Solin Omer; Nineveh – Lydya Khallat; Sulaymaniyah – Shnyar Ali

== Delegates ==
15 girls representing different regions competed in the national beauty contest.

State	Name	Hometown	Placement	Notes
Anbar	Abtesam Chiad	Ramadi		Assumed title to represent the region after original contestant withdrew.
Babylon	Mayada Saad	Hillah		Did not appear on stage at the coronation ceremony.
Baghdad Belt	Shahad Shaalan	Baghdad	Top 8	
Basra	Ranya Abbas	Basra		
Chavi Tourism City	Solin Omer	Sulaymaniyah	Top 8	
Diyala	Aya Mohammed	Baqubah		Withdrew due to illness
Dohuk	Noor Hamo	Dohuk		
Erbil	Sara Abduljabbar	Erbil	3rd Runner-up	
Halabja-Hawraman	Masty Hama	Halabja/Sulaymaniyah	1st Runner-up	
Karkh (West Baghdad)	Vian Sulaimani	Sulaymaniyah	Winner	Sister of former Miss Earth Iraq - Suzan Amer
Kirkuk	Chilar Mehmet	Kirkuk		
Nineveh	Lydya Khallat	Bashiqa-Bahzany	Top 8	First Yazidi woman to participate in a beauty contest
Rusafa	Marina Roqan	Baghdad/Damascus	2nd Runner-up	
Soran	Asena Mudheher	Rawandiz		
Sulaymaniyah	Shnyar Ali	Sulaymaniyah	Top 8	
