= Sigmund Sternberg =

Hungarian-British philanthropist, business man and Labour Party donor

Sir Sigmund Sternberg
- KCSG GCFO JP
- Born: 2 June 1921; Budapest, Kingdom of Hungary
- Died: 18 October 2016 (aged 95)
- Occupations: Businessman, philanthropist
- Spouses: Ruth Schiff; Hazel Sternberg
- Children: Frances Aviva Blane; Michael Sternberg; Ruth Tamir (nee Sternberg); David Sternberg

Sir Sigmund Sternberg KCSG GCFO OOA JP (Hungarian: Sternberg Zsigmond; 2 June 1921 – 18 October 2016) was a Hungarian-British philanthropist, interfaith campaigner, businessman and Labour Party donor.

== Early life ==
Sternberg was born in 1921 in Budapest, Hungary. He was Jewish. He emigrated to England in 1939, and was naturalised as a British citizen in 1947.

== Career ==
Sternberg worked in the scrap metal trade. After the war, he founded Sternberg Group of Companies. By 1968 he retired from the scrap metal trade and focused on commercial property investments.

== Philanthropy ==
Sternberg worked to promote dialogue between different faiths. For example, he relocated a Roman Catholic convent at Auschwitz. Moreover, he organised the first papal visit to a synagogue in 1986. Additionally, he negotiated the Vatican's recognition of the state of Israel.

Sternberg established The Sir Sigmund Sternberg Charitable Foundation in 1969 and was one of the co-founders of the Three Faiths Forum. Sternberg was Life President of the Movement for Reform Judaism. He was chairman of the Sternberg Interfaith Gold Medallion.

== Distinctions ==
In 1976, Sternberg was knighted by Queen Elizabeth II, and in 1985 he was made a Papal Knight Commander of the Order of St. Gregory the Great (KCSG) by Pope John Paul II. He was awarded the Templeton Prize for Progress in Religion in 1998 for his interfaith work worldwide. In November 2005, Sternberg was promoted to the highest rank within the Royal Order of Francis I to the grade of Knight Grand Cross (GCFO), this in recognition of his contributions to furthering the interfaith activities of the British and Irish Delegation. In 2008, he received the FIRST International Award for Responsible Capitalism, lifetime achievement medal. In 2009 he was made Officer of the Order of Ouissam Alaouite by King Mohammed VI.

== Politics ==
Sternberg was a long-term Labour Party supporter and donor, and was one of its top 50 donors in 2001 with a gift of £100,000 to its head office.

== Personal life and death ==
Sternberg married Ruth Schiff in 1949. They had a son, Michael Sternberg, and a daughter, artist Frances Aviva Blane. They divorced in 1969, and he later married Hazel Sternberg, who died in 2014. He died on 18 October 2016.
