= Anthony Bailey (PR advisor) =

British public relations consultant

Anthony Bailey GCSS GCHS
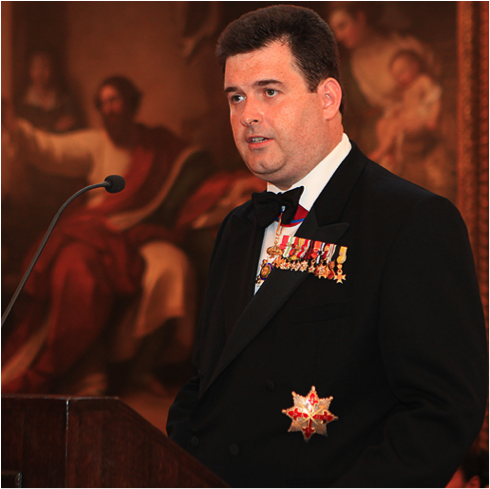
- Bailey in 2012
- Born: 13 January 1970 (age 56); London, England
- Occupation: Public relations consultant
- Spouse: Marie-Therese von Hohenberg (m. 2007; div. 2018)
- Children: 1
- Website: anthonybailey.org

Anthony John James Bailey GCSS GCHS (born 13 January 1970) is a British-born Irish public relations consultant.

Bailey was active in UK political circles in the early 2000s and has also had roles with various charities and Catholic organisations. He has received and been stripped of various honours, including an Order of the British Empire (OBE) awarded in the 2008 Birthday Honours, which was revoked in 2023 after a London High Court judge sentenced him to prison for contempt of court in a 2022 divorce settlement hearing.

== Personal life and background ==
The son of an Irish mother, Veronica, and an English father, Colin, Bailey was born in London on 13 January 1970 and brought up in Ruislip, attending The Douay Martyrs School, then University College London. (Note: The Observer says London School of Economics, but this may relate to an event Bailey organised there. Bailey's company website and his LinkedIn profile both say he graduated from the UCL School of Slavonic and East European Studies in 1991.) His father was an engineer and instructor at FÁS, an Irish state body responsible for training the unemployed. Before entering public relations, Bailey sold men's suits and worked in a pizza restaurant.

== Public relations ==
Bailey was a senior account director for communications firm Burson-Marsteller, which he joined in 1993, chairman of his own company Eligo International (incorporated in 1998), then chairman of Anthony Bailey Ltd, a public relations company incorporated in 2014. Eligo International was dissolved in January 2016 with their final accounts showing funds of -£85,000. Anthony Bailey Ltd did not trade until 2016, and in accounts posted that year showed liabilities of more than £40,000. Anthony Bailey Ltd was dissolved by order of Companies House in October 2020. Its most recent accounts from 2018 showed it had built up losses of more than £220,000.

In 2006, Bailey assisted with the first British royal marriage to take place at the Vatican since the Reformation. Described as the couple's friend, spokesman and wedding planner, he supported the Catholic wedding of Lord Nicholas Windsor, son of Prince Edward, Duke of Kent, to British-born Croatian aristocrat Princess Paola Doimi de Lupis Frankopan Šubić Zrinski. The couple had an audience with Pope Benedict XVI at the Apostolic Palace before a small ceremony.

In 2007 The Observer referred to Bailey as a "PR guru who is one of the most influential men you have never heard of" and "a key player in the world of Catholic and Middle East politics." Bailey's descriptions of his own occupation have included "Public Relations Consultant" (2010), "Royal And Diplomatic Consultant" (2011), and "Head R. Order of Knighthood" (2004).

== Politics ==
Bailey was co-president of the think-tank British Influence and a supporter of Britain's membership of both the European Union and the Commonwealth. He was a supporter of the Conservative Party until 1999 from which time he aligned himself with the Labour Party. He made a substantial donation to the failed leadership campaign of David Miliband in 2010.

In 2005, it emerged that a £500,000 donation Bailey had made to the Labour Party had been rejected by its chief fundraiser, Lord Levy, who allegedly feared the money had come from foreign businessmen. Bailey insisted the money was his own and issued legal proceedings. He later said: "The Labour party has apologised unreservedly for any distress that the affair caused". A subsequent donation of £50,000 was accepted.

== New version of a royal order of knighthood ==
In the 1990s, Bailey "revived" the so-called "Delegation for Great Britain and Ireland of the Sacred Military Constantinian Order of Saint George", under the authority of Prince Carlo, Duke of Castro, who is the "Franco-Neapolitan branch" claimant to the headship of the House of Bourbon-Two Sicilies. (The House of Bourbon-Two Sicilies has controlled no territory since the Kingdom of the Two Sicilies was suppressed in 1860. Since 1960 the headship of the House has been disputed.) In 2009 Bailey was appointed "magistral delegate" of the Delegation, and the organisation has awarded him other honours. Bailey has never been an officer or member of the long-established version of the Order, which is under the authority of Prince Pedro, Duke of Calabria, the "Hispano-Neapolitan branch" claimant to the House of Bourbon-Two Sicilies. The longstanding version of the Order has no connection with Bailey, nor with his business activities, nor with the order of which he is described as "delegate".

In December 2020, Bailey resigned from all the roles he held in his branch of the Constantinian Order, citing its impact on his "physical and mental health", though his personal website still lists him as a "campaigner" for the order. There has been no announcement of a successor, although the order's website continues to be maintained.

== Charity activities ==
Bailey was appointed in 1999 as executive chairman of the Saudi organization "Painting & Patronage". (The UK company "Painting and Patronage" was dissolved in 2014.) From December 2005 to November 2013, Bailey was a director of the United Learning Trust. He was, from December 2009 to July 2016, a director of St Mary's University.

In 2016, Bailey was appointed President of the Executive Council of the Portuguese Centenary Appeal. He is also a Patron of the Faiths Forum for London.

== Controversies ==
In 1995 police recorded his telephone conversations with a client, who claimed to be a Libyan prince. Bailey was accused of blackmailing the client, but the case was dismissed before it got to court. Bailey complained to the Press Complaints Commission about the way this was reported in the Daily Mail in 2010; in resolution, the PCC negotiated a statement from the Mail that it had omitted some details in reporting these circumstances, and that it apologised for any distress caused.

Bailey claimed to be Ambassador-at-Large for The Gambia between 2004 and 2007, though the Gambian High Commission in London said at the time that they don't know much about him and "He has no office here".

According to the Prime Minister of Grenada, Keith Mitchell, Bailey asked to be made the country's ambassador to the Holy See, which Mitchell rejected.

=== Honours granted and removed ===
In the 2008 Birthday Honours, Bailey was appointed an Officer of the Order of the British Empire (OBE) "for his services to inter-religious relations and charity." This was revoked in August 2023 following Bailey's failure to obey court orders.

In 2014, Bailey was appointed Knight Grand Cross of the Most Distinguished Order of the Nation, by the Governor-General of Antigua and Barbuda. In May 2016, the British tabloid The Mail on Sunday reported that Bailey was accused of incorrectly using an Antiguan knighthood as if it were a British title. (Since 1813, Buckingham Palace and the Foreign Office have not allowed the use of titles from foreign knighthoods in the United Kingdom by British citizens.)

Bailey also stated that he had Antiguan citizenship based on his Antiguan passport, issued when he was appointed as their special economic envoy to the European Union in 2015. The Antiguan government did confirm that Bailey's passport inaccurately stated that he is a national of Antigua and Barbuda. However, Bailey was never granted Antiguan citizenship, whether by investment or otherwise.

The British firm that printed the nation's passports apparently assumed that anyone, to be issued an Antigua and Barbuda passport, would be a national of that country -- and they were not informed that this did not apply to Bailey. Bailey's knighthood and his appointment as an economic envoy then became subject to review by the Antiguan Governor General. On 21 July 2017, his Antiguan knighthood was annulled. He remarked: "It is unfortunate that this important goodwill and interfaith engagement has been damaged by a farcical and Machiavellian side show akin to an Ealing comedy. The strong political overtones to this dirty campaign which are well documented and the internal chivalric war led by some highly questionable and unchristian individuals is regrettable."

Bailey was granted a Grenadian knighthood in 2015. The government of Grenada reviewed this grant and took legal advice; the knighthood was rescinded in August 2016. In December 2016 Private Eye reported that Bailey's lawyers were issuing legal warning letters to any Caribbean local newspapers which had reported on the knighthood controversies.

=== Divorce and prison sentence ===
In 2007, Bailey married Marie-Therese von Hohenberg, the great-granddaughter of Archduke Franz Ferdinand of Austria. Their wedding in Salzburg followed an engagement party held at St John's in London's Smith Square attended by royalty and around 40 ambassadors. They had a child in 2010, and lived in Twickenham, south-west London. They separated in 2016, Hohenberg instigated divorce proceedings, and Bailey was subsequently accused of failing to make court-ordered payments of £2 million to his ex-wife.

On 1 February 2022, the High Court in London gave Bailey a 12-month prison sentence for contempt of court, following his persistent refusal to comply with a court-ordered £1 million divorce settlement to his aristocrat ex-wife. The order came after she filed legal action in response to Bailey's repeated breaches, including halting the sale of their £4 million six-bedroom villa near Lisbon, Portugal—effectively blocking her right to a half-share of the asset.

The judge Sir Robert Peel condemned Bailey for "obstructing the court at almost every possible opportunity, deploying numerous tactical and forensic ploys to attempt to delay the process, and divert attention from his grossly culpable conduct". The judge described Bailey’s behaviour as "dishonesty, wilful obstruction, and barefaced contempt for the court process, all to avoid paying that which is owed to his former wife. It is a shameful spectacle deserving of considerable opprobrium."

Bailey was believed to be in Portugal (in January 2022 he claimed to be too ill to travel, but he had made seven trips to Spain, Germany, Rome, and the US between June 2021 and January 2022, and the judge on this occasion, Sir Jonathan Cohen, discovered that he was actually in Florida). His lawyers maintain that he cannot be extradited from Portugal, arguing that the sentence stems from a civil matter, not a criminal one. As such, the prison sentence will only take effect if he returns to the United Kingdom.

In February 2023, it was announced that Bailey was engaged to a Florida socialite, Ms Farley Rentschler of Palm Beach (the couple had previously been seen at various US social events, including a New York party in September 2022, and a British Art reception and a Palm Beach white tie centennial ball in January 2023). Rentschler and Canadian Cyril Woods were implicated in Bailey's contempt of court and, in their absence, were each given prison sentences of four months by the court. Woods, like Bailey, had his Antiguan knighthood revoked in 2017 and was a trustee of the Portuguese Centenary Appeal.

In May 2021, Bailey was appointed Honorary Consul General of Tonga by King Tupou VI to Portugal, due to his long-standing relationship with Tonga. In August 2023, Bailey was reportedly still residing in Portugal, and claimed to be working for the King of Tonga. Apparently renouncing his British citizenship, he described himself as "an Irish national", and "a true internationalist, a proud European, an Irishman living in Portugal, father to an amazing son, diplomat & interfaith and charity campaigner."

== Honours and awards ==
For many years, Bailey has sought honours and awards, particularly those of chivalric orders. Some were received in exchange for awards bestowed by Bailey's recreated order of knighthood, and some awards received have since been revoked amid controversy.

- Knight Grand Cross of the Equestrian Order of the Holy Sepulchre of Jerusalem (KGCHS) - July 2017
- Officer's Cross of the Hungarian Order of Merit - March 2013, in recognition of his "decades-long activity in strengthening British-Hungarian relations and promoting interfaith dialogue."
- Sternberg Interfaith Gold Medallion - 2012, in recognition of "many years of contribution to the improvement of understanding between the faiths in the UK and across the world."
- Knight Grand Cross of the Order of Saint Sylvester (GCSS) - July 2009; Knight Commander (KCSS) - 2004
- Grand Officer of the Order of San Carlos - 2008, in a reciprocal arrangement whereby Bailey's Order and Colombian authorities gifted awards to each other.
- Commander of the Order of Infante Dom Henrique (ComIH) - 12 July 2005, in recognition of "his efforts to promote Portuguese relations."
- Commander of the Order of Ouissam Alaouite - 2004, in recognition of "his profession work to furthering European-Moroccan ties."

=== Revoked honours ===
- Officer of the Order of the British Empire (OBE) - Awarded in the 2008 Birthday Honours "for his services to inter-religious relations and charity." Revoked in August 2023 due to Bailey's breach of the court order. (After the honour was revoked, Bailey remarked "This latest news will no doubt bring great joy to my ex wife. It is yet another illustration of what is fundamentally wrong with the deeply flawed divorce process in Britain and why its overhaul is long overdue.")
- Knight Grand Cross of the Most Distinguished Order of the Nation of Antigua – Awarded in 2014, revoked in 2017.
- Knight Grand Cross of the Order of the Nation of Grenada – Awarded in 2015, revoked in 2016.
- Governor General of Grenada's Medal of Honour (in Gold) – Awarded in 2015, revoked in 2016.

== Publications ==
- "How do we tell the real story?", pp. 61–69 in Having Faith in Foreign Policy, London, (2007)
