= Aviva Dautch =

British poet, academic and curator

- Born: 5 May 1978; Salford, England
- Occupations: Poet, academic, curator and magazine publisher
- Website: https://www.avivadautch.com/

Aviva Dautch (born 5 May 1978) is a British poet, academic, curator and magazine publisher, who is of Eastern European Jewish ancestry.

== Work ==
She has been writer in residence at the British Museum, the Jewish Museum London and the Separated Child Foundation and is resident expert on BBC Radio 4's poetry series On Form presented by poet Andrew McMillan. She is the English co-translator for Afghan refugee poet and BBC World Service journalist Suhrab Sirat.

Her poems and translations have appeared in Agenda, Ambit, Modern Poetry in Translation, The North, The Rialto, The Poetry Review and The Spectator. In 2018 she was commissioned by Bradford Literature Festival to create a poetic response to Gustav Klimt's work to mark his centenary. The resulting film poem was shown at the Hay Festival. The same year she received an Authors' Foundation award from the Society of Authors to complete her first full poetry collection.

Her sequence of poems about clearing her hoarding mother's home won the 2017 Primers Prize and were featured on BBC Radio 4's Woman's Hour. During the 2020 COVID-19 pandemic lockdown, Radio 4 made an extended half-hour programme We Sigh for Houses, in which she explored what it means to be the child of a hoarder and how her poetry seeks to make order and beauty from the chaos in which she grew up.

She has written articles, and curated exhibitions and events for arts organisations including the Bethlem Museum of the Mind, The British Library, The Royal Academy of Arts and Tara Arts. In April 2022, Dautch curated the Poets for Ukraine fundraising gala which featured Harriet Walter, Meera Syal and Nicholas Hytner, alongside British poets including Carol Ann Duffy, Jackie Kay, Imtiaz Dharker, Hannah Lowe and Andrew Motion, showcasing work by Ukrainian poets from the frontline and the diaspora.

One of Dautch's frequent collaborators is actress Juliet Stevenson. The two have worked together on projects including the centenary celebrations for Rosalind Franklin, an event marking the discovery of a new short story by Nobel Laureate Isaac Bashevis Singer, and a number of BBC Radio 4 poetry programsme.

She is well known in the Jewish community, where she lectures internationally on Jewish arts and culture. In 2020 she was appointed Executive Director of Jewish Renaissance magazine. Dautch also teaches Jewish Culture and Holocaust Studies at the University of Roehampton and lectures at the London School of Jewish Studies and JW3. On her popular Table Manners podcast, singer Jessie Ware discussed her studies with Dautch, who is preparing her for her bat mitzvah.

== #NeverAgainIsNow ==
On 19 June 2018, Dautch retweeted a video of detention facilities for refugee children in the United States with the hashtag #NeverAgainIsNow, which went viral. Her tweet was one of the first uses of this hashtag as a rallying cry and commentary on parallels between American President Donald Trump's immigration policies and the Nazi era. Since then, it has been used widely by Jewish campaigning groups across America protesting against migrant detention and the separation of children from their families. During a BBC Radio 4 interview, Dautch explained that her intention was not to diminish the atrocities of the Holocaust, or to suggest that Trump had an explicit genocidal agenda, but as a call to social action and to draw attention to research about the stages through which a climate is created that will allow genocide or atrocity to take place. These include discrimination, dehumanisation and classification and separation of the other both physically and through language.
