= Jewish Renaissance =

Quarterly British cultural magazine

- October 2018 issue
- Editor: Rebecca Taylor
- Categories: Jewish culture
- Frequency: Quarterly
- Circulation: 4,000 – 5,000
- Publisher: Renaissance Publishing Ltd
- Founder: Janet Levin
- First issue: October 2001
- Country: United Kingdom
- Based in: London
- Language: English
- Website: www.jewishrenaissance.org.uk
- ISSN: 1476-1769

Jewish Renaissance is a quarterly cultural magazine, founded in October 2001, covering Jewish culture, arts and communities in Britain and beyond. It is edited by Rebecca Taylor, a former News Editor at Time Out London.

== Scope and content ==
The magazine focuses on the arts – visual arts and architecture, music, cinema, theatre and literature in Europe and in Israel – as well as on Jewish identity and relations with other cultures and religions. In each issue there is a 10–16 page illustrated feature (now called Passport) on a different Jewish community around the world, drawing on historical material, contemporary interviews, and a cultural events listing, among other content. The October 2012 issue, for instance, looked at the Jewish community in Brazil, in January 2014, Jews in Kraków, Poland, in April 2016, the community in Brighton and, in July 2017, the Jews of Gibraltar.

The magazine also contains in-depth interviews of people of interest from a Jewish historical or cultural viewpoint. For example, it interviewed Mike Leigh prior to the National Theatre production of his 2005 play Two Thousand Years, Glasgow artist Hannah Frank and philanthropists Elizabeth Sackler of the Arthur M. Sackler Foundation and Nasser David Khalili. The magazine published an interview with Helga Bejach, a Jewish child rescued on the Kindertransport and subsequently adopted by the family of Richard and David Attenborough. In July 2012, on the eve of the 2012 Paralympic Games in London, it interviewed Israeli Paralympic rower Moran Samuel. In October 2013 it interviewed Dame Vivien Duffield. It interviewed violinist Irmina Trynkos in January 2015 and author Howard Jacobson in January 2016. In January 2017 the magazine interviewed British surgeon and cochlear implant pioneer Ellis Douek.

== Organisation ==
The magazine is independent and is financed by subscriptions, advertising and grant funding. It is published by Renaissance Publishing, a registered charity, whose Executive Director is poet, academic and arts curator Dr Aviva Dautch. Jewish Renaissance was founded by Janet Levin who edited the magazine from 2001 to 2014 and was Chief Executive until early 2019. Individuals from the British Jewish community who sit on its editorial advisory board include the educator Clive Lawton; actress Maureen Lipman; Ben Barkow, former Director of the Wiener Library; and Alex Brummer, City Editor of UK national newspaper the Daily Mail; the music historian David Conway is a member of the editorial committee. David Dangoor is the organisation's President.
