= Alina Mansur =

Aruban model

- Born: Alina Danelle Mansur; 26 September 1991 (age 35); Malmok, Aruba
- Height: 5 ft 10 in (178 cm)
- Beauty pageant titleholder
- Title: Miss Aruba 2017
- Hair color: Dark Brown
- Eye color: Black
- Major competitions: Miss Carnival Queen International 2010 (Winner); Miss Aruba 2017 (Winner); Miss Universe 2017 (Unplaced)

Alina Danelle Mansur (born 26 September 1991) is an Aruban model and beauty pageant titleholder who was crowned Miss Aruba 2017 and represented her country at Miss Universe 2017.

== Early life ==
Mansur was born in Malmok, Aruba on 26 September 1991. She is a Management and Business Administration graduate from Florida International University in Miami, Florida.

== Pageantry ==
=== Miss Aruba 2017 ===
Mansur participated in the Miss Aruba 2017 pageant, where she was crowned as Miss Universe Aruba 2017. She succeeded outgoing Miss Aruba 2016 Charlene Leslie.

=== Miss Universe 2017 ===
Mansur represented Aruba at Miss Universe 2017 where she failed to place. Demi-Leigh Nel-Peters of South Africa was crowned as Miss Universe.

Awards and achievements
Preceded by Charlene Leslie	Miss Aruba; 2017	Succeeded by Kimberly Julsing
