= Sternberg Interfaith Gold Medallion =

The Interfaith Gold Medallion is a award founded in 1986 and granted by the Sir Sir Sigmund Sternberg Charitable Foundation.

== Purpose of the award ==
The purpose of the award is to recognise those who have "endeavoired to make an exceptional contribution to the improvement of understanding between the faiths in the United Kingdom, and across the world". The Medallion is awarded to outstanding individuals who have helped promote peace and tolerance between people of different faiths. This has included heads of state and government, royalty, and religious, civic, business, and philanthropic leaders.

The Chairman of the award is Michael Sternberg KC KCFO.

== Notable winners ==
- Professor Jagbir Jhutti Johal (2025)
- Laura Marks (2025)
- Julie Siddiqi (2025)
- Sir Stephen Timms (2023)
- The Lord Richard Chartres (2023)
- David Dangoor (2019)
- Dr Peter Ammon, German Ambassador to the Court of St James (2017)
- Queen Elizabeth II of the United Kingdom (2007)
- Pope John Paul II (2005)
- Anthony Bailey (2012)
- Ferenc Glatz, Hungarian academic
- King Hassan II of Morocco
- Cardinal Basil Hume
- President Árpád Göncz of Hungary
- Queen Sofia of Spain
- President Dr Johannes Rau of Germany
- Archduke Otto von Habsburg of Austria-Hungary
- President Mary Robinson of Ireland
- King Carl XVI Gustav of Sweden
- Cardinal Edward Cassidy
- Khalid Hameed, Baron Hameed
- Yehudi Menuhin, Baron Menuhin
- Dr John Templeton
- Professor David F. Ford, Founding Director, the Cambridge Inter-Faith Programme (2008)

The Sternberg Charitable Foundation applies its funds for general charitable purposes by the making of grants in particular to charitable institutions. It has a special interest in the furtherance of interfaith activities and the promotion and support of education in the fields of racial and religious harmony.
