= Vian Sulaimani =

Iraqi beauty pageant titleholder (born 1993)

- Born: October 25, 1993 (age 32); Baghdad, Iraq
- Occupation: Miss Iraq 2017
- Website: www.instagram.com/vian_alsulaymani

Vian Sulaimani (Arabic: فيان سليماني; October 25, 1993) is an Iraqi beauty pageant titleholder who won the Miss Iraq 2017 but she was dethroned for being married.

== Early life and education ==
Vian Amer Noori Sulaimani was born in Al Mansoor, a town in the Baghdad Governorate, Iraq to a family of Kurdish origins. She received her bachelor's degree in Computer Engineering and Software from Mustansiriya University.

== Withdrawal of the Miss Iraq 2017 Award ==
On August 3, 2017, the Miss Iraq 2017 award was withdrawn from Sulaimani for violating the rules of the competition, because she was married to a student named Aziz, a citizen of Irish nationality. During the registration she brought her passport where she was not mentioned as being married. Sulaimani said during the recording that she was involved in a betrothal that had been annulled but was in fact married and now is separated or divorced. Therefore, Sulaimani violated the rules of the international organizations that the Miss Iraq 2017 was licensed to.
