= Renée Dangoor =

Iraqi beauty queen (1925–2008)

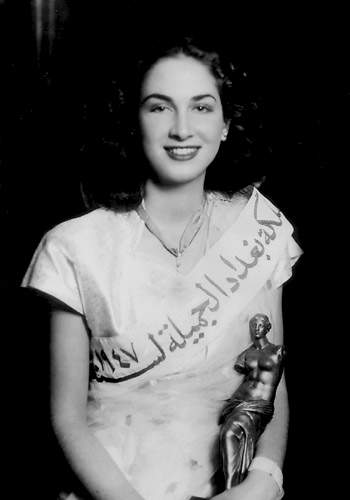
- Born: Renée Rebecca Dangoor; December 1925; Shanghai, Republic of China
- Died: 9 July 2008 (aged 82); London, England
- Spouse: Naim Dangoor
- Children: 4
- Beauty pageant titleholder
- Title: Miss Iraq 1947
- Hair color: Brown
- Eye color: Dark Green
- Website: Official website

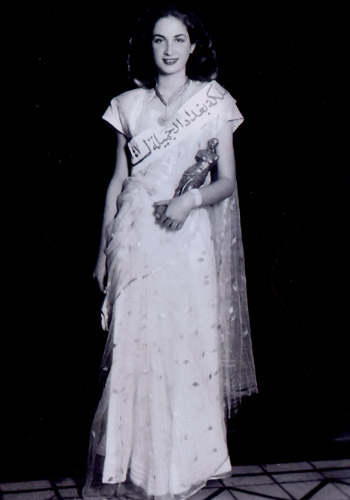
Renée Dangoor crowned Miss Baghdad, with trophy (1 January 1948)

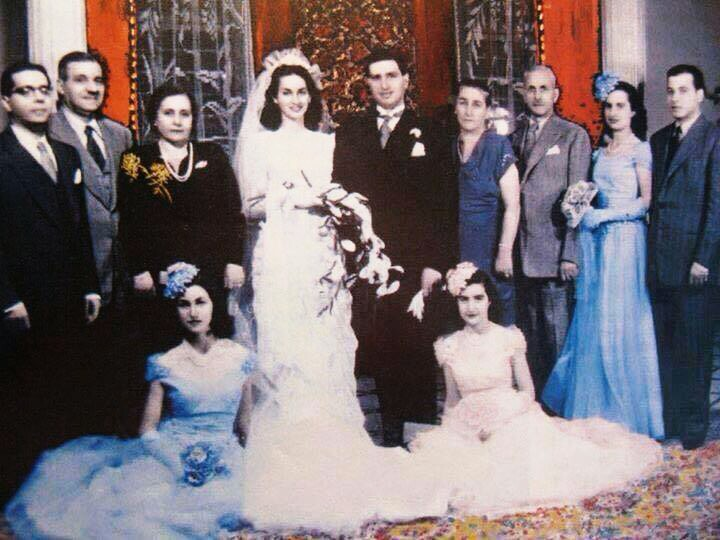
Renée Dangoor's marriage with Naim Dangoor, November 1947

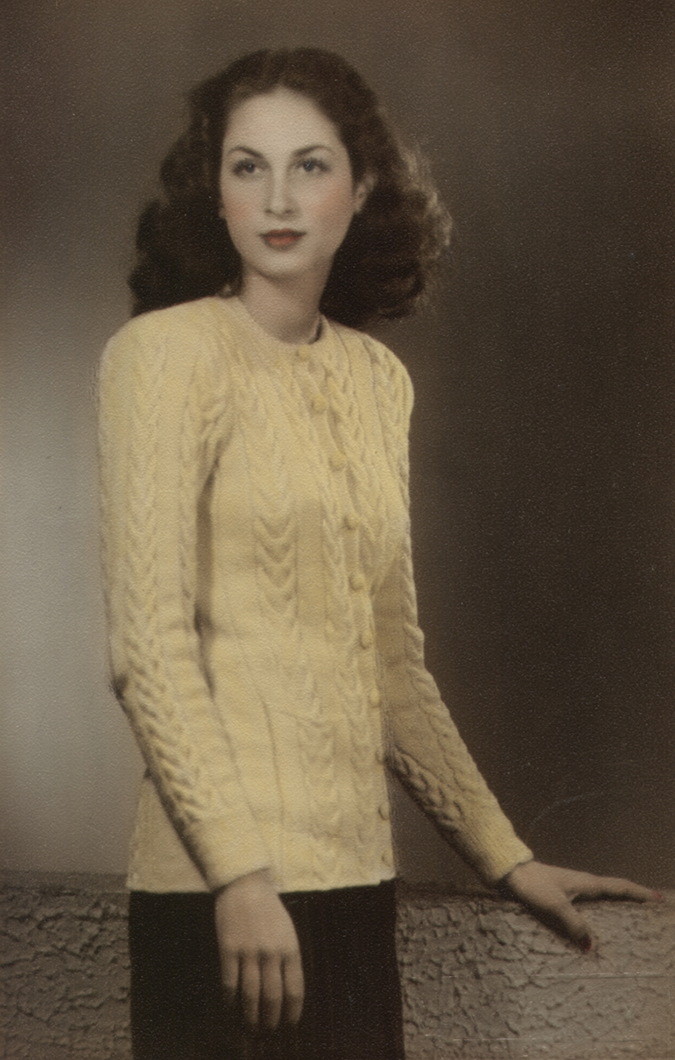
Colorised picture of Renée Dangoor after her marriage (1948)

Renée Rebecca Dangoor (Arabic: رينيه دنكور; December 1925 - 9 July 2008) was the first beauty queen in the history of Iraq, being crowned in 1947.

She belonged to a distinguished family of Baghdadi Jews. Her father, Moshe Dangoor (1888–1962), was a prominent doctor in Baghdad, whose father was the Chief Rabbi of Baghdad, Ezra Dangoor (1848–1930). Her mother was Sybil Luna Dangoor. Her paternal uncle, Eliahou Dangoor (1883-1976), father of her future husband, ran the Ezra Reuben Dangoor Print (established in Baghdad in 1904 by his father), one of the oldest in Iraq, said to be the world's largest printer of books in Arabic.

She was born in Shanghai, where her family temporarily lived for business. The family moved back to Baghdad when she was still a child.

Renée Dangor was crowned Miss Baghdad on 31 December 1946, aged 21. In September 1947, she was awarded the title of Miss Iraq. The celebration was held at the Iraqi Flying Club, during the New Year's Benefit Ball. In November 1947, she married her cousin, Naim Dangoor (1914–2015), with whom she had four sons, one of whom is British businessman and philanthropist David Dangoor. The family left Iraq in 1959 although Naim Dangoor continued managing the family business in Iraq for some years, until it was expropriated from him.

Her memorial webpage records a lecture by her, held in October 1990, on the subject of the Jews of Shanghai and their plight during the Second World War.

== Death ==
Renée Dangoor died on 9 July 2008, aged 82, from breast cancer.
