= Edy Cohen =

Israeli researcher, journalist and specialist in the Arab–Israeli conflict

- אדי כהן
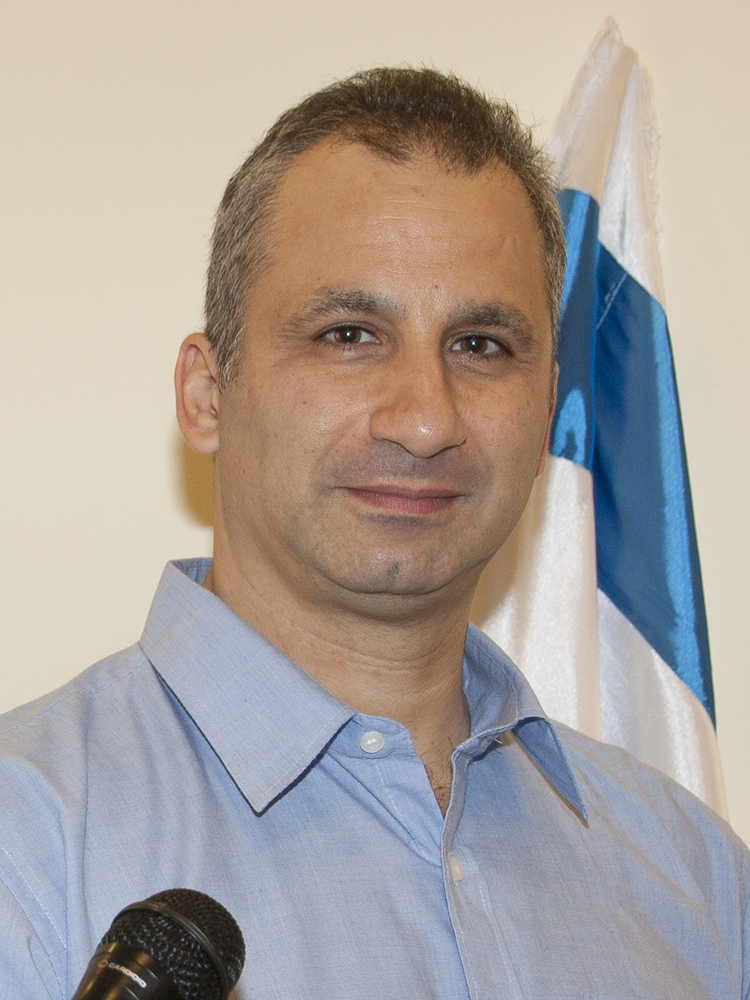
- Born: Edward Haïm Cohen Halala; 18 February 1972 (age 54); Beirut, Lebanon
- Occupations: Journalist, researcher

Edward "Edy" Haïm Cohen Halala (Hebrew: אדי כהן, Arabic: إيدي كوهين; born 18 February 1972) is an Israeli of Lebanese Jewish origin, researcher, journalist and specialist in the Arab–Israeli conflict. He is a commentator on Arab social media.

== Biography ==
In 1972, Edward Haïm Cohen Halala was born in Beirut, the capital of Lebanon, to a wealthy Jewish family named Cohen Halala. He was educated at the Christian school in the city until the kidnapping and murdering of his father in 1985. Cohen and his family immigrated to Israel.

Cohen has a bachelor's degree in political science, a master's degree, and a doctorate in Middle Eastern History, all from Bar-Ilan University. He also engaged in post-doctoral research at the Menachem Begin Center for Underground Movement Research, Bar-Ilan University. Cohen speaks Hebrew, Arabic, and French at a native level, and English at a professional competence level.

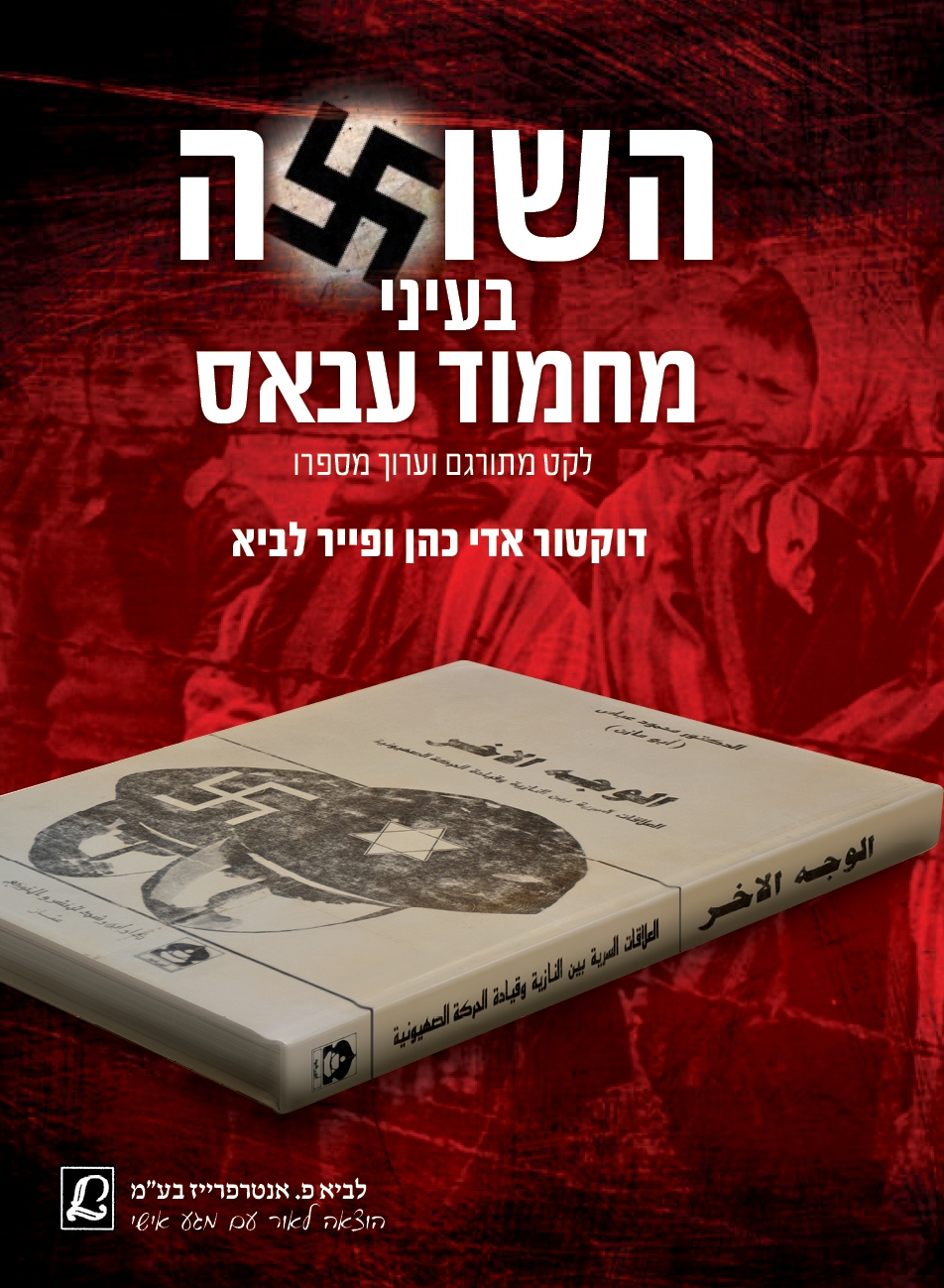
The Holocaust in the eyes of Mahmoud Abbas

== Books ==
- 2017 "The Holocaust in the Eyes of Mahmoud Abbas," - A book about Mahmoud Abbas's doctoral thesis on the relations between Zionism and Nazism, 2017.
- "The Mufti and the Jews," a book about the anti-Jewish activities of Haj Amin al-Husseini in Palestine, Iraq, Lebanon, and Germany and his cooperation with the Nazi government in the extermination of European Jews, 2021.
