= Gillain Berry =

Jamaican-Aruban model

- Born: Gillain Berry; 1988 (age 37–38); Kingston, Jamaica
- Occupation: Model
- Height: 1.75 m (5 ft 9 in)
- Beauty pageant titleholder
- Title: Miss Aruba 2010
- Hair color: Brown
- Eye color: Brown
- Major competitions: Miss Aruba 2010 (Winner); Miss Universe 2011 (Unplaced); Miss World 2011 (Unplaced)

Gillain Berry (born 1988) is a Jamaican-Aruban model and beauty pageant titleholder who was crowned Miss Aruba 2010 on December 4, 2010, and represented her country in Miss Universe 2011 and Miss World 2011.

== Early life ==
Prior to competing in Miss Aruba, Berry worked as a professional model, appearing on local television commercials and magazine ads. She plans to study for her bachelor's degree at the University of Aruba and speaks English and Papiamento.

== Miss Aruba ==
Berry, who stands 1.75 m (5 ft 9 in) tall, competed in her country's national beauty pageant, Miss Aruba, held in Oranjestad on December 4, 2010, where she was crowned the eventual winner of the title, gaining the right to represent Aruba in the 2011 Miss Universe and Miss World pageants.

Awards and achievements
Preceded by Priscilla Lee	Miss Aruba; 2010	Succeeded by Liza Helder
