= Sarah Idan =

Iraqi-American model and politician (born 1990)

Sarah Abdali Idan
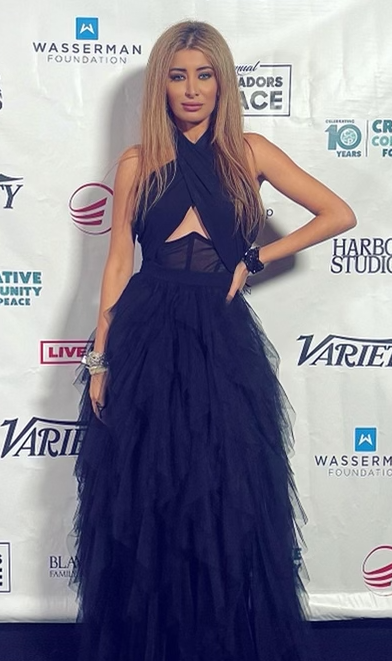
- Idan in 2022
- Born: Sarah Abdali Idan; 4 February 1990 (age 36); Baghdad, Iraq
- Height: 5 ft 7 in (170 cm)
- Political party: Democratic
- Beauty pageant titleholder
- Title: Miss Universe Iraq 2017
- Hair color: Light Brown
- Eye color: Brown
- Major competitions: Miss Universe Iraq 2017 (Winner); Miss Universe 2017 (Unplaced)

Sarah Abdali Idan (Arabic: سارة عيدان; born 4 February 1990) is an Iraqi-American model, television host, musician, beauty pageant titleholder, and politician who was crowned as Miss Universe Iraq 2017 and represented Iraq at the Miss Universe 2017 pageant.

Idan moved to the United States in 2017. In May 2023, she declared her candidacy for California's 30th congressional district in 2024 before withdrawing soon after. She defines herself as a cultural Muslim and supporter of Israel.

== Early life ==
Idan was born and raised in Baghdad to Sunni Muslim parents from the provinces of Babylon and Qadisiyah. When she was 13, Idan taught herself English by listening to the lyrics of western music. After the 2003 invasion of Iraq, the family moved to Syria but returned to Iraq a few years later. Her proficiency in English enabled her to work as a linguist for the US military at the age of 18. She also joined the US-led Coalition forces stationed around Baghdad in 2009.

Idan later studied in the US, graduating from Musicians Institute in performance arts in Hollywood, Los Angeles with a major in jazz and contemporary music. She describes herself as not very religious, but more spiritual and a cultural Muslim.

== Career ==
=== Music ===
In 2007, while living as a refugee in Syria, Idan attended a live concert of Enrique Iglesias in Damascus and realized she wanted to be a musician. She met with Enrique and his band after the concert and became friends with pianist Michael Bluestein (member of the rock band Foreigner) whom she corresponded with through email. In 2014 they met again and performed together in a live jam in Los Angeles. Idan sings in English and Arabic.

After obtaining her vocal performance artist degree, she began writing music and performing in venues in Los Angeles. She wrote/composed and performed a song "Just for you" for the Egyptian movie Monkey Talks (El-Qird Beyitkallem). She performed numerous times on Egyptian TV from 2016-2017. She plays piano, guitar and harmonica and can sing in English, Arabic, Spanish, Portuguese and French.

=== Beauty pageants and controversies ===
Idan was crowned Miss Iraq in America in 2016. She was crowned in Miss Universe Iraq 2017. She later represented Iraq at the Miss Universe 2017 pageant in Las Vegas. She is the first Iraqi model to participate in the Miss Universe pageant in 45 years. However, for taking selfies with Adar Gandelsman, who participated as Miss Israel at Miss Universe 2017, and for wearing a bikini in a swimsuit competition, she angered many Iraqis (who are often conservative Sunni or Shia Muslims) and she later received death threats. Eventually, Idan was forced to flee Iraq with her family. She immigrated to the United States in December 2009.

In June 2019, Idan became an Ambassador for Peace by UN Watch, and she spoke at the UNHRC, criticizing the Iraqi government's failure to condemn death threats against her and its curtailment of freedom of speech. She also called out biased media for not reporting on Hamas firing missiles at Israeli civilians and using Palestinians as human shields. Those remarks prompted the Security and Defense Committee of the Iraqi Parliament to consider revoking her Iraqi citizenship. In September 2020, she was invited to the signing ceremony of the Abraham Accords, the establishment of relations between Israel, the United Arab Emirates and Bahrain at the White House, where she also took pictures with the head of the Mossad, Yossi Cohen.

=== Television ===
Starting January 2018, Idan hosted an entertainment show with Indian news channel WION.

=== Politics ===
In May 2023, she declared her candidacy for California's 30th congressional district in 2024.

== Visits to Israel ==
In June 2018, Idan went to visit her friend Adar Gandelsman in Jerusalem. She toured in Mahane Yehuda Market where she was received warmly by the Israeli Jews of Iraqi origin. She described her visit by saying:

It actually felt weird—the people look like my people. And the city looks like Damascus, like Syria, and I've been there, so everything seems familiar to me.

Regarding the Arab–Israeli conflict, she said:

I don't think Iraq and Israel are enemies. I think maybe the governments are enemies with each other, but there are a lot of Iraqi people who don't have a problem with Israel or with the Jewish people. There are a lot of Iraqi people on my side, and I believe they are happy I am here.

In December 2023, she revisited Israel, in which she toured the location of the Kfar Aza massacre, during the Gaza war, then she prayed for peace at the Western Wall.

Awards and achievements
Preceded by Wijdan Burhan El-Deen Sulyman	Miss Universe Iraq 2017; 2017	Succeeded by TBA
