= David Dangoor =

British businessman and philanthropist

David Dangoor CBE DL
- Born: 1948 (age 77–78); New York
- Occupation: Businessman
- Known for: Philanthropy
- Spouse: Judy (née Emmett)
- Children: Four (two sons, two daughters)
- Parent(s): Sir Naim Dangoor and Renée Dangoor
- Honours: Honorary doctorate, Bar-Ilan University, 2017 Commander of the Order of the British Empire (CBE), 2021 Honorary doctorate, The Open University, 2022

David Alan Ezra Dangoor CBE DL (born December 1948) is a British businessman and philanthropist. He heads the Elixarch's Foundation, the Dangoor family's charitable foundation, and has been involved in education, medical and scientific research, Jewish communal life, heritage and cultural organisations in the United Kingdom and Israel.

== Early life and education ==
Dangoor was born in New York in December 1948, one of four sons of Sir Naim Dangoor and Renée Dangoor. He grew up in Baghdad as part of Iraq's Jewish community before the family moved to the United Kingdom in 1960.

He attended Carmel College from 1961 to 1967 and subsequently studied physics at Imperial College London, graduating in 1971. After university he worked as a systems analyst at IBM before joining his family's commercial property business.

== Philanthropy and education ==
Dangoor heads The Exilarch's Foundation, established by his father, Sir Naim Dangoor, in 1978. Through the Foundation and Dangoor Education, the family has supported projects principally in education, healthcare and medical research, science, Jewish heritage, and cultural and community organisations in the United Kingdom and Israel.

The Foundation is the sponsor of Westminster Academy in London. Dangoor has served as a sponsor governor of the Academy since its establishment in 2006.

In higher education, the Foundation and Dangoor Education have supported programmes at institutions including Imperial College London, The Open University, the Weizmann Institute of Science and Bar-Ilan University.

At Imperial College, where David Dangoor and his brother Elie Dangoor are alumni, the family's support has included multidisciplinary cancer research, educational outreach through the Wohl Reach Out Lab and The Invention Rooms, the Dangoor Reach Out Makerspace and the development of Dangoor Plaza at the South Kensington campus.

At the Weizmann Institute of Science, David and Judy Dangoor funded the establishment of the Dangoor Research Accelerator Mass Spectrometry (D-REAMS) Laboratory in 2013 and subsequently the Dangoor Chair of Archaeological Sciences. Dangoor is a member of the Institute's International Board.

At Bar-Ilan University, the family's support has included the Sir Naim Dangoor Centre for Universal Monotheism and the Dangoor Centre for Personalized Medicine.

== Healthcare and medical research ==
Healthcare and medical research have formed a significant part of the activities of The Exilarch's Foundation and Dangoor Education.

The Dangoor family has supported Cancer Research UK over a number of years. Through Cancer Research UK, this has included support for the creation and development of the Francis Crick Institute in London and, subsequently, for its public engagement and online information activities.

The family's support for cancer research has also included multidisciplinary research at Imperial College London.

The Exilarch's Foundation funded the establishment of the Sir Naim Dangoor Centre for Cellular Immunotherapy at University College London Hospitals and has subsequently supported the development of its CAR T-cell programme, aimed at accelerating the delivery of cellular immunotherapies to cancer patients.

Dangoor has also been involved in initiatives connecting medical and technological innovation in Israel with healthcare in the United Kingdom, including programmes developed with the UK Israel Tech Hub.

== Jewish communal life and heritage ==
Dangoor was President of the Board of the S&P Sephardi Community from 2011 to 2016. He is a Vice-President of the Jewish Leadership Council and of the World Organization of Jews from Iraq (WOJI) and is President of Jewish Renaissance magazine.

He has taken a particular interest in the history and heritage of Iraq's Jewish community. He has campaigned for access to the Iraqi Jewish Archive and has written about Iraqi-Jewish history and relations between Jews and Arabs.

Dangoor commissioned and funded Remember Baghdad, a documentary directed by Fiona Murphy about the experiences of Iraqi Jewish families and the departure of much of the Jewish community from Iraq during the twentieth century. Dangoor also appears in the film as a contributor.

The Exilarch's Foundation was among the principal supporters of the restoration and development of Bevis Marks Synagogue in the City of London, including the creation of the Dangoor Heritage and Education Centre.

== Living kidney donation ==
In January 2019, Dangoor donated a kidney to his brother Robert Dangoor, who died in 2022.

Following Robert's death, the Dangoor family supported the establishment of a national programme to increase awareness of living kidney donation. Launched in 2024, the Robert Dangoor Partnership for Living Kidney Donation is run by Kidney Research UK in partnership with Give a Kidney and provides information and support relating to living kidney donation.

== Public and community roles ==
Dangoor served as a Deputy Lieutenant of Greater London from 2016 until retiring from active service at the age of 75 in 2023. He retains the post-nominal letters DL. During his period as a Deputy Lieutenant he chaired the Lord-Lieutenant of Greater London's Council on Faith.

He is a Fellow of the British Exploring Society and an Honorary Fellow of the Royal Albert Hall.

He has also served as Honorary President of the Space Science Engineering Foundation and as a trustee of the Simon Wiesenthal Centre UK.

== Honours and awards ==
Dangoor was awarded an honorary doctorate by Bar-Ilan University in 2017 and also by The Open University in 2022.

He received the Sternberg Interfaith Gold Medallion in 2019.

He was appointed Commander of the Order of the British Empire (CBE) in the 2021 Birthday Honours for services to the community in Greater London.

== Writings ==
Dangoor has written on Iraqi-Jewish history, Jewish-Arab relations and Jewish communal affairs, including contributing to The Jerusalem Post.

== Personal life ==
Dangoor is married to Judy (née Emmett). They have four children. His brothers are Michael and Eli Dangoor, and the late Robert Dangoor.
