= Iraqi beauty pageants =

Miss Iraq Organization
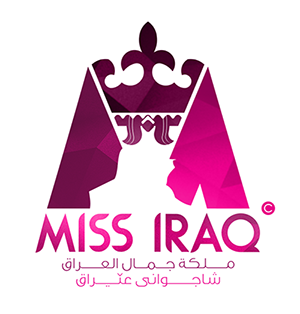
- Miss Iraq Logo
- Formation: 1947
- Type: Beauty pageant
- Headquarters: Baghdad
- Location: Iraq
- Members: Miss World
- Official language: Arabic; Kurdish; English
- Website: missuniverseiraq.com

There are a number of Iraqi beauty pageants. Miss Iraq is one of the national beauty pageants in Iraq. Others include Miss World Iraq and Miss Earth Iraq.

== History ==
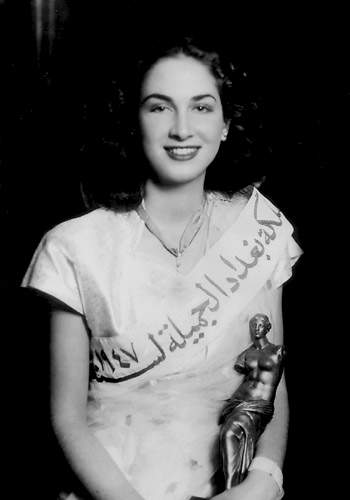
Renee Dangoor, an Iraqi Jew, won the first title of Miss Iraq in 1947.

In 2015 the first season after 43 years absence, the official national beauty contest of Iraq recognized by Ministry of Culture, Tourism and Antiquities has been held in Baghdad. The Miss Iraq titles set to be three categories which are Miss Iraq, Iraq's Maiden of Beauty and Mesopotamian Princess.

The pageant is organized by a group of civil activists, leaders from the beauty and fashion community and with the support of the Ministry of Culture, Tourism and Antiquities of Iraq.

In 2016, Miss Iraq Organization sent Miss Mesopotamia 2015 winner Susan Amer Sulaimani (Noori), a Kurdish student in Baghdad to participate in the Miss Earth 2016 pageant as Iraq's first representative since 1972 in the Big Four beauty pageants. She wore a dress instead of a bikini during the pageant's press conference.

== National franchise holders ==
In the late 2010's, Miss Iraq returned and debuted to the several international beauty pageant, such as Miss Earth in 2016, Miss Universe in 2017 and the Miss World in 2022.

== Titleholders ==
Year	Miss Iraq	Governorate
1947	Renée Dangoor	Baghdad
1962	Kholoud Saleh	Baghdad
1963	Sameera Zeidan	Baghdad
1971	Nasik Shali	Sulaymaniyah
1972	Wijdan Burhan El-Deen Sulyman	Baghdad
2014	Melinda Toma	Babylon
2015	Shimaa Qasim	Kirkuk
2017	Sarah Idan	Babylon
2021	Maria Farhad	Nineveh Plains
2022	Balsam Hussein	Baghdad

== International pageants ==
The following women have represented Iraq in the international beauty pageant which included Big Four beauty pageants; Miss World, Miss Universe, and Miss Earth, as well as other international pageants.

=== Miss Universe Iraq ===
- : Declared as Winner
- : Ended as runner-up or top 5/6 qualification
- : Ended as one of the finalists or semifinalists
- : Ended as special awards winner

Year	Governorate	Miss Universe Iraq	Placement	Special Award	Note
2026	Baghdad	Samantha Slewa	TBA		
2025	Baghdad	Hanin Al Qoreishy	Unplaced		
Did not compete between 2023—2024
2022	Baghdad	Balsam Hussein	Did not compete		Due to franchise matter, she decided to withdraw.
Did not compete between 2018—2021
2017	Baghdad	Sarah Idan	Unplaced	Best National Costume (Top 16)	
2016	Kirkuk	Shimaa Qasim	Did not compete		Due to personal reasons, Qasim withdrew at Miss Universe 2016.
Did not compete between 1973—2015
1972	Baghdad	Wijdan Burhan El-Deen Sulyman	Unplaced		

=== Miss World Iraq ===
- : Declared as Winner
- : Ended as runner-up or top 5/6 qualification
- : Ended as one of the finalists or semifinalists
- : Ended as special awards winner

Year	Governorate	Miss World Iraq	Placement	Special Award	Note
Did not compete since 2025–present
No pageant held in 2024
2023	Baghdad	Balsam Hussein	Unplaced		
No pageant held in 2022
2021	Nineveh	Maria Farhad	Unplaced	Best Designer Dress Award (2nd Runner-Up)	
Did not compete between 2018—2020
2017	Halabja	Masty Hama	Did not compete		
Did not compete between 1999—2016
1998	Baghdad	Ban Kadret	Did not compete		Kadret withdrew due to a disagreement between Eric Morley and the Miss Iraq organizers.

=== Miss Earth Iraq ===
- : Declared as Winner
- : Ended as runner-up or top 5/6 qualification
- : Ended as one of the finalists or semifinalists
- : Ended as special awards winner

Year	Governorate	Miss Earth Iraq	Placement	Special Award	Note
Did not compete since 2023—present
2022	Wasit	Jihan Majid	Unplaced		
2021	Diyala	Sima Mohamed	Did not compete		
Did not compete between 2017—2020
2016	Baghdad	Susan Amer	Unplaced		
Did not compete between 2010—2015
2009	Baghdad	Aure Arnulf	Did not compete		

=== Miss Grand International ===
- : Declared as Winner
- : Ended as runner-up or top 5/6 qualification
- : Ended as one of the finalists or semifinalists
- : Ended as special awards winner

Year	Governorate	Miss Grand Iraq	Placement	Special Award	Note
Did not compete since 2017—present
2016	Baghdad	Klaodia Khalaf	Unplaced		
