= List of beauty pageants =

List of beauty pageant competitions

A beauty pageant or beauty contest is a competition that has traditionally focused on judging and ranking the physical attributes of contestants. Pageants have now evolved to include other criteria, such as personality, intelligence, talent, character, causes, and charitable involvement, through closed-door interviews with judges, or the conventional question-and-answer round(s) in the finals. The term "beauty pageant" originally refers to the Big Four international beauty pageants.

Pageant titles are divided into Miss, Mrs., Mister, and Teen, as well as international, regional, and national—to clearly identify the differences among these categories. Similar events for male pageants are usually called by other names, some are likely to be bodybuilding competitions.

== Women's pageants ==
=== International competitions ===
Major

The following are list of the world's Big Four beauty pageants (the original Big Four) considered the most important in the world.

- Miss World (1951–2019; 2022; 2024–present)
- Miss Universe (1952–present)
- Miss International (1960–1965; 1967–2019; 2022–present)
- Miss Earth (2001–present)

Minor

The following are minor beauty pageants. These lists are based on the year they were established.

- Miss Intercontinental (1971–present)
- World Miss University (1986–present)
- Miss Model of the World (1988–2019; 2022; 2025–present)
- Miss Tourism World (1991–present)
- Top Model of the World (1993–present)
- Miss Tourism Queen of the Year International (1993–present)
- Miss Tourism International (1994–present)
- The Miss Globe (2004–2011; 2013–present)
- Miss Aura International (2006–present)
- Miss Tourism Metropolitan International (2007–present)
- Miss Supranational (2009–present)
- Miss Progress International (2010–present)
- Miss Supertalent of the World (2011–present)
- Miss Scuba International (2011–present)
- Face of Beauty International (2012–present)
- Miss Grand International (2013–present)
- Miss Global (2013–present)
- Miss Global International (2014–2019, 2023–present)
- Miss Cosmopolitan World (2015–present)
- Miss Eco International (2015–present)
- Miss, Mrs., Miss Teen Europe Global
- Miss Planet International (2019; 2022–present)
- Miss Cosmo World (2017–present)
- Miss Multinational (2017–present)
- Miss Polo International (2018–present)
- Miss Glam World (2018–present)
- Miss Glamour Look International (2019–present)
- Miss Supermodel Worldwide (2019–present)
- Queen of International Tourism (2019–present)
- World's Unforgettable Beauty (2020–present)
- Miss Ocean World (2020–present)
- Miss Elite (2021–present)
- Miss Glamour International (2021–present)
- Miss Environment International (2022–present)
- Miss Face of Humanity (2022–present)
- Miss Petite Global (2022–present)
- Queen of the World (2022–present)
- Supermodel International (2022–present)
- Miss Supraglobal (2022–present)
- Miss Business Global (2023–present)
- Miss Charm (2023–present)
- Miss Fitness Supermodel World (2023–present)
- Miss Mutya International (2023–present)
- Universal Woman (2023–present)
- Miss Cosmo (2024–present)
- Miss Celebrity International (2024–present)
- Miss Wellness World (2025–present)
- MGI All Stars (2026–present)

=== Continental, regional, sub-regional, and cultural ===
The following are continental and regional pageants:

- Miss Europe (1927; 1929–1939; 1948–2006; 2016–present)
- Reinado Internacional del Café (1957–present)
- Miss Asia Pacific International (1965, 1968–2005, 2016–2019, 2024–present)
- Miss América Latina (1981–present)
- Miss Asian America (1985–present)
- Reina Mundial del Banano (1985–2019, 2022, 2025–present)
- Miss Africa (1987–present)
- Miss Pacific Islands (1987–present)
- Miss India Worldwide (1990–present)
- Reina Hispanoamericana (1991–present)
- Miss European Global (2000–present)
- Miss Chinese World (2005, 2011, 2017, 2021, 2023–present)
- Miss European Union (2006, 2021–present)
- Mrs. Europe (2009–present)
- World Muslimah (2011–present)
- Miss Filipina International (2013–present)
- Miss Europe Continental (2013–present)
- Miss South East Asia Tourism Ambassadress (2015–present)
- Miss Europe World (2015–present)
- Miss & Mrs Europe Global (2015–present)
- Miss Europe (Austria) (2019–present)
- Reina Internacional de la Paz Petite (2020–present)
- Reina Internacional del Cacao (2020–present)

Teen

List of teen beauty pageants:

- Miss Teen International (Americas) (1966–present)
- Miss Teen Intercontinental (1973–present)
- Miss Teenager World (1990–present)
- Miss Teen World (2001–present)
- Miss Teen Earth (2012–present)
- Teen Universe International (2012–present)
- Miss Teen Africa (2014-present)
- Miss Teen International (India) (2018–present)
- Miss Teen Universe (Ecuador) (2003–present)
- Miss Teen Universe (United States) (2019–present)
- Miss Teen Supranational (2018–present)
- Miss Eco Teen (2018–present)
- Miss Teen Grand International (2023–present)
- Miss Teen Icon International (2024–present)

Marital

List of international marital beauty pageants:

- Mrs. World (1984–present)
- Mrs. International (1988–present)
- Mrs. Globe (1996–present)
- Mrs. Universe (2007–present)
- Ms. International World (2007-present)

Senior

List of senior women (aged 40+) beauty pageants:

- Senior Pageants Group

Discontinued

- Miss Globe International (1925–2021)
- International Pageant of Pulchritude (1926–1935)
- Miss Subways (1941–1976, 2004, 2017–2019, 2023)
- Miss Scandinavia (1961–1974, 1976–1981, 1986–2005, 2007–2008, 2021)
- International Teen Princess (1966–1974)
- Miss Maja International (1966–1989)
- Queen of The Pacific (1967–1977)
- Miss Young International (1970–1981, 1983, 2002, 2006–2008)
- Miss Charming International (1972)
- Miss Globe (1974–2018)
- Miss Asia Pageant (1985–2022)
- Miss Wonderland (1987–1989)
- Miss Chinese International Pageant (1988–2019)
- Miss All Nations (1989–1990, 2010–2019)
- Miss Charm International (1989–1990)
- Miss Flower Queen (1990)
- Miss Baltic Sea (1991–2008)
- Miss Global Beauty Queen (1998–2009, 2011, 2015–2017)
- Miss Arab World (2006–2021)
- Miss United Continents (2006–2022)
- Nuestra Belleza Latina (2007–2016, 2018, 2021)
- ECOWAS Peace Pageant (2008–2012)
- Miss University Africa (2010–2012, 2017–2018; 2021)
- Miss Asia Pacific World (2011–2014)
- Miss Heritage Global (2013–2016, 2019, 2022)
- Miss Crystal Angel International (2018)
- Reina Mundial de los Carnavales (2020–2021)

=== National ===
==== Africa ====
- Algeria
  - Miss Algeria
- Angola
  - Miss Angola
- Botswana
  - Miss Botswana
  - Miss Universe Botswana
  - Miss Earth Botswana
- Cameroon
  - Miss Cameroon
- Cape Verde
  - Miss Cape Verde
- Central African Republic
  - Miss Central African Republic
- Chad
  - Miss Chad
- Côte d'Ivoire
  - Miss Côte d'Ivoire
- Congo Democratic Republic
  - Miss Congo (RDC)
  - Miss Earth DR Congo
  - Miss Universe DR Congo
- Egypt
  - Miss Egypt
- Ethiopia
  - Miss Ethiopia
  - Miss Universe Ethiopia
- Gabon
  - Miss Gabon
- Ghana
  - Miss Universe Ghana
  - Miss Ghana
  - Miss Earth Ghana
  - Miss Malaika Ghana
  - Ghana's Most Beautiful
  - Miss Grand Ghana
- Guinea
  - Miss World Guinea
- Guinea-Bissau
  - Miss World Guinea-Bissau
- Kenya
  - Miss Kenya
  - Miss World Kenya
  - Miss Universe Kenya
- Lesotho
  - Miss World Lesotho
- Liberia
  - Miss Liberia
  - Miss Earth Liberia
- Madagascar
  - Miss Madagascar
- Mauritius
  - Miss Mauritius
  - Miss Estrella Mauritius
  - Miss Earth Mauritius
- Mayotte
  - Miss Mayotte
- Morocco
  - Miss Maroc
- Mozambique
  - Miss Mozambique
- Namibia
  - Miss Namibia
  - Miss Grand Namibia
- Nigeria
  - Most Beautiful Girl in Nigeria
  - Miss Universe Nigeria
  - Miss Nigeria
  - Miss Earth Nigeria
  - The Nigerian Queen
  - Miss Grand Nigeria
- Republic of the Congo
  - Miss Earth Republic of Congo
- Réunion
  - Miss Réunion
  - Miss Earth Reunion
- Rwanda
  - Miss Rwanda
- Seychelles
  - Miss Seychelles
- Sierra Leone
  - Miss Sierra Leone
  - Face of Sierra Leone
- Senegal
  - Miss Senegal
- South Africa
  - Miss South Africa
  - Miss Earth South Africa
  - Miss Grand South Africa
  - Miss African Beauty South Africa
  - Miss Charm South Africa
- South Sudan
  - Miss South Sudan
  - Miss Earth South Sudan
- Tanzania
  - Miss Universe Tanzania
  - Miss Tanzania
  - Miss Grand Tanzania
- Tunisia
  - Miss Tunisia
- Uganda
  - Miss Uganda
  - Miss Earth Uganda
- Zambia
  - Miss Zambia
  - Miss Universe Zambia
  - Miss Earth Zambia
- Zimbabwe
  - Miss Zimbabwe
  - Miss World Zimbabwe
  - Miss Earth Zimbabwe
  - Miss Global Zimbabwe
  - Miss Grand Zimbabwe
  - Miss Heritage Zimbabwe

==== Asia ====
- Afghanistan
  - Miss Afghanistan
- Armenia
  - Miss Armenia
- Azerbaijan
  - Miss Azerbaijan
- Bahrain
  - Miss Universe Bahrain
- Bangladesh
  - Miss Bangladesh
  - Miss World Bangladesh
  - Miss Universe Bangladesh
  - Miss Earth Bangladesh
  - Miss Grand Bangladesh
- Bhutan
  - Miss Bhutan
- Cambodia
  - Miss Cambodia
  - Miss Grand Cambodia
- China
  - Miss Universe China
  - Miss China World
  - Miss International China
  - Miss Earth China
  - Miss Grand China
  - Hong Kong
    - Miss Hong Kong Pageant
    - Miss Asia Pageant
    - Miss Grand Hong Kong
  - Macau
    - Miss Macau
    - Miss Grand Macau
  - Tibet
    - Miss Tibet
- Cyprus
  - Miss Cyprus
- Georgia
  - Miss Georgia
- India
  - Femina Miss India
  - Miss Universe India
  - Miss Diva
  - Miss Divine Beauty
  - Miss Supranational India
  - Glamanand Supermodel India
  - Miss Earth India
  - Miss India International
  - Miss Grand India
  - Miss Teen Diva
  - Miss India Worldwide India
  - Gladrags Megamodel Contest
  - Elite Model Look India
  - I Am She–Miss Universe India
  - Alee Club
- Indonesia
  - Puteri Indonesia
  - Miss Indonesia
  - Miss Universe Indonesia
  - Miss Grand Indonesia
  - Miss Mega Bintang Indonesia
  - Putri Nusantara
  - Putri Bumi Indonesia
  - Putri Pariwisata Indonesia
- Iran
  - Miss Earth Iran
  - Miss Grand Iran
- Iraq
  - Iraqi beauty pageants
  - Miss Grand Kurdistan
- Israel
  - Miss Israel
  - Miss Holocaust Survivor
- Japan
  - Miss Nippon
  - Miss Japan
  - Miss Universe Japan
  - Miss World Japan
  - Miss International Japan
  - Miss Earth Japan
  - Miss Grand Japan
- Jordan
  - Miss Jordan
- Kazakhstan
  - Miss Kazakhstan
  - Miss Grand Kazakhstan
- Kyrgyzstan
  - Miss Kyrgyzstan
- Laos
  - Lao beauty pageants
  - Miss Grand Laos
- Lebanon
  - Miss Lebanon
  - Miss Grand Lebanon
- Maldives
  - Miss Universe Maldives
- Malaysia
  - Miss Universe Malaysia
  - Miss World Malaysia
  - Miss International Malaysia
  - Miss Supranational Malaysia
  - Miss Grand Malaysia
  - Ratu Wanita Malaysia
- Mongolia
  - Miss Mongolia
  - Miss Universe Mongolia
  - Miss World Mongolia
- Myanmar
  - Miss Universe Myanmar
  - Miss Myanmar World
  - Miss Myanmar International
  - Miss Earth Myanmar
  - Miss Supranational Myanmar
  - Miss Grand Myanmar
- Nepal
  - Miss Universe Nepal
  - Miss Vibhaa
  - Miss Cosmo Nepal
  - Miss Teen Nepal
  - Miss Nepal
  - Miss Grand Nepal
  - Mister and Miss National Nepal
- Pakistan
  - Miss Pakistan World
  - Miss Universe Pakistan
  - Miss Earth Pakistan
  - Miss Grand Pakistan
  - Miss Pakistan Universal
- Philippines
  - Binibining Pilipinas
  - Miss Universe Philippines
  - Miss Philippines Earth
  - Miss World Philippines
  - Miss Republic of the Philippines
  - Mutya ng Pilipinas
  - Miss Grand Philippines
  - Reina Filipinas
  - The Miss Philippines
- Singapore
  - Miss Universe Singapore
  - Miss World Singapore
  - Miss Singapore International
  - Miss Earth Singapore
  - Miss Grand Singapore
- South Korea
  - Miss Korea
  - Miss Queen Korea
  - Miss Grand Korea
- Sri Lanka
  - Miss Earth Sri Lanka
  - Miss Universe Sri Lanka
  - Miss World Sri Lanka
  - Miss Sri Lanka Online
  - Miss Grand Sri Lanka
- Taiwan
  - Miss Chinese Taipei
  - Miss Grand Taiwan
- Thailand
  - Miss Thailand
  - Miss Teen Thailand
  - Miss World Thailand
  - Miss Universe Thailand
  - Miss Earth Thailand
  - Miss International Thailand
  - Miss Grand Thailand
  - Miss Supranational Thailand
- Turkey
  - Miss Turkey
  - Miss Grand Turkey
- Uzbekistan
  - Miss Uzbekistan
- Vietnam
  - Miss Vietnam
  - Miss Universe Vietnam
  - Miss World Vietnam
  - Miss Grand Vietnam
  - Miss Supranational Vietnam
  - Miss Earth Vietnam
  - Miss Cosmo Vietnam
  - Miss Vietnam World

==== Europe ====
- Albania
  - Miss Universe Albania
  - Miss Shqipëria
  - Miss Grand Albania
- Austria
  - Miss Austria
  - Miss Earth Austria
- Belarus
  - Miss Belarus
  - Miss Grand Belarus
- Belgium
  - Miss Belgium
  - Miss Belgian Beauty
  - Miss International Belgium
  - Miss Earth Belgium
  - Miss Grand Belgium
- Bosnia and Herzegovina
  - Miss Bosne i Hercegovine
  - Miss Earth BiH
- Bulgaria
  - Miss Bulgaria
  - Miss Universe Bulgaria
  - Miss World Bulgaria
- Croatia
  - Miss Universe Croatia
  - Miss Croatia
- Czech Republic
  - Czech Miss
  - Miss České republiky
  - Miss Czech Republic
- Denmark
  - Miss Denmark
  - Miss Universe Denmark
  - Miss World Denmark
  - Face of Denmark
- Estonia
  - Miss Estonia
- Finland
  - Miss Finland
  - Suomen Neito
- France
  - Miss France
  - Miss International France
  - Miss Grand France
  - Miss Excellence France
  - Miss Corsica
- Germany
  - Miss Germany
  - Miss Universe Germany
  - Miss World Germany
  - Miss Earth Germany
  - Miss Grand Germany
- Gibraltar
  - Miss Gibraltar
- Greece
  - Star Hellas
  - Star GS Hellas
  - Miss Grand Greece
- Hungary
  - Miss Hungary
  - Miss Universe Hungary
  - Magyarország Szépe
  - Miss Grand Hungary
  - Belle of the Anna-ball
- Iceland
  - Miss Iceland
  - Miss World Iceland
- Ireland
  - Miss Universe Ireland
  - Miss Ireland
- Italy
  - Miss Italia
  - Miss Italia nel Mondo
  - Miss Universo Italia
  - Miss World Italy
  - Miss Earth Italy
  - Miss Grand Italy
- Kosovo
  - Miss Universe Kosovo
  - Miss World Kosova
  - Miss Kosovo
  - Miss Grand Kosovo
- Latvia
  - Mis Latvija
  - Miss Universe Latvia
- Liechtenstein
  - Miss Liechtenstein
- Lithuania
  - Miss Lithuania
  - Miss Captivity Pageant
- Luxembourg
  - Miss Luxembourg
  - Miss Grand Luxembourg
- Malta
  - Miss Malta
  - Miss World Malta
  - Miss Malta Universe
  - Miss Grand Malta
- Monaco
  - Miss Monaco
- Montenegro
  - Miss Montenegro
- Netherlands
  - Miss Nederland
  - Miss Universe Netherlands
  - Miss International Netherlands
  - Miss Earth Netherlands
  - Miss Grand Netherlands
- North Macedonia
  - Miss North Macedonia
- Norway
  - Miss Norway
- Poland
  - Miss Polski
  - Miss World Poland
  - Miss Polonia
  - Miss Earth Poland
- Portugal
  - Miss República Portuguesa
  - Miss Queen Portugal
- Romania
  - Miss Romania
  - Miss Grand Romania
- Russia
  - Miss Russia
  - Miss International Russia
  - Krasa Rossii
  - Miss Russian Army
  - Miss Grand Russia
  - Miss Grand Tatarstan
  - Miss Grand Bashkortostan
- San Marino
  - Miss San Marino
- Serbia
  - Miss Serbia
- Slovakia
  - Miss Slovakia
  - Miss Universe Slovenskej Republiky
  - Miss Grand Slovakia
- Slovenia
  - Miss Universe Slovenia
  - Miss Slovenia
  - Miss Earth Slovenia
- Spain
  - Miss Spain
  - Miss Earth Spain
  - Miss Grand Spain
- Sweden
  - Miss Sweden
  - Miss World Sweden
  - Miss Earth Sweden
  - Lucia Bride of Sweden
  - Nya Fröken Sverige
- Switzerland
  - Miss Switzerland
  - Miss World Switzerland
  - Miss Earth Switzerland
  - Miss Grand Switzerland
- Ukraine
  - Miss Ukraine
  - Miss Ukraine Universe
  - Miss Grand Ukraine
- United Kingdom
  - Miss Universe Great Britain
  - Miss Great Britain
  - Miss United Kingdom
  - Miss Africa Great Britain
  - Miss Grand United Kingdom
  - England
    - Miss England
    - Miss Earth England
  - Northern Ireland
    - Miss Northern Ireland
    - Miss Earth Northern Ireland
  - Scotland
    - Miss Scotland
    - Miss Earth Scotland
  - Wales
    - Miss Wales
    - Miss Earth Wales

==== North America ====
- Antigua and Barbuda
  - Miss Antigua & Barbuda
- Aruba
  - Miss Aruba
  - Señorita Aruba
- Bahamas
  - Miss Bahamas
  - Miss Universe Bahamas
  - Miss Grand Bahamas
- Barbados
  - Miss Universe Barbados
  - Miss Barbados World
- Belize
  - Miss Universe Belize
  - Miss World Belize
  - Miss Earth Belize
- Bermuda
  - Miss Bermuda
  - Miss World Bermuda
- Bonaire
  - Miss Bonaire
- British Virgin Islands
  - Miss British Virgin Islands
- Canada
  - Miss Canada
  - Miss Universe Canada
  - Miss World Canada
  - Miss Earth Canada
  - Miss Teen Canada
  - Miss Canada International
  - Miss Grand Canada
- Cayman Islands
  - Miss Cayman Islands
- Costa Rica
  - Miss Costa Rica
  - Reinas de Costa Rica
  - Miss Grand Costa Rica
- Cuba
  - Miss Cuba
  - Miss Grand Cuba
- Curaçao
  - Miss Curaçao
  - Miss International Curaçao
  - Señorita Curaçao
  - Miss Grand Curaçao
- Dominica
  - Miss Dominica
- Dominican Republic
  - Miss Dominican Republic
  - Miss Grand Dominican Republic
- El Salvador
  - Miss El Salvador
  - Nuestra Belleza Mundo El Salvador
  - Reinado de El Salvador
- Greenland
  - Miss Greenland
- Grenada
  - Miss Grenada World
- Guadeloupe
  - Miss Guadeloupe
  - Miss International Guadeloupe
- Guatemala
  - Miss Guatemala
- Haiti
  - Miss Haiti
- Honduras
  - Miss Honduras
  - Miss Grand Honduras
- Jamaica
  - Miss Jamaica Universe
  - Miss Jamaica World
  - Miss Earth Jamaica
  - Miss Jamaica Global
  - Miss Grand Jamaica
- Martinique
  - Miss Martinique
  - Martinique Queens
- Mexico
  - Mexicana Universal
  - Miss Mexico Organization
  - Miss Earth México
  - Señorita México
  - Miss Grand Mexico
- Nicaragua
  - Bellezas Globales De Nicaragua
  - Miss Nicaragua
  - Miss Universe Nicaragua
  - Miss Mundo Nicaragua
  - Miss Nicaragua International
  - Miss Grand Nicaragua
  - Miss Supranational Nicaragua
- Panama
  - Señorita Panamá
- Puerto Rico
  - Miss Puerto Rico
  - Miss Universe Puerto Rico
  - Miss World Puerto Rico
  - Miss International Puerto Rico
  - Miss Earth Puerto Rico
  - Miss Grand Puerto Rico
  - Miss Puerto Rico's Outstanding Teen
- Saint-Barthélemy
  - Miss St. Barthelemy
  - Miss Saint Martin and Saint Barthélemy
- Saint Kitts and Nevis
  - Miss Saint Kitts and Nevis
- Saint Lucia
  - Miss Saint Lucia Universe
  - Miss Saint Lucia World
- Saint-Martin (French part of Saint Martin)
  - Miss Saint Martin and Saint Barthélemy
- Sint Maarten (Dutch part of Saint Martin)
  - Miss Sint Maarten
- Saint Pierre and Miquelon
  - Miss Saint Pierre and Miquelon
- Saint Vincent and the Grenadines
  - Miss Saint Vincent and the Grenadines
- Trinidad and Tobago
  - Miss Trinidad and Tobago
  - Miss Universe Trinidad and Tobago
  - Miss Earth Trinidad and Tobago
  - Miss Grand Trinidad and Tobago
- Turks and Caicos
  - Miss Turks and Caicos
- United States
  - Miss America
  - Miss America's Teen
  - Miss USA
  - Miss World America
  - Hawaiian Tropic Teen Miss
  - Miss Asian America
  - Miss Black America
  - Miss Black USA Pageant
  - Miss Chinatown USA
  - Miss Earth USA
  - Miss Grand USA
  - Miss Hawaiian Tropic USA
  - Miss India USA
  - Ms. International (2010–present)
  - Miss Latina US
  - Miss Rodeo America
  - Miss Rodeo USA
  - Miss Teen Rodeo USA
  - Miss Supranational USA
  - Miss U.S. International
  - Miss United States
  - Miss Teen America
  - Miss Teen US Latina
  - Miss Teen USA
  - Miss Teenage America
  - Ms. Texas Senior America
  - Miss Viet Nam Continents
  - Mrs. America
  - National Sweetheart
  - Miss Navajo
- US Virgin Islands
  - Miss Grand United States Virgin Islands
  - Miss US Virgin Islands
  - Miss Virgin Islands
  - Miss Virgin Islands' Outstanding Teen

==== Oceania ====
- Australia
  - Miss Australia
  - Miss Earth Australia
  - Miss International Australia
  - Miss Universe Australia
  - Miss World Australia
  - Miss Latina Australia
  - Miss Grand Australia
- Cook Islands
  - Miss Cook Islands
- Fiji
  - Miss Fiji
- Guam
  - Miss Guam
  - Miss World Guam
  - Miss Earth Guam
- New Caledonia
  - Miss New Caledonia
- New Zealand
  - Miss Universe New Zealand
  - New Zealand at Miss World
  - Miss Earth New Zealand
- Northern Mariana Islands
  - Miss Marianas
- Samoa
  - Miss Samoa
- Tahiti/French Polynesia
  - Miss Tahiti
- Wallis and Futuna
  - Miss Wallis and Futuna

==== South America ====
- Argentina
  - Miss Argentina
  - Belleza Argentina
  - Miss Earth Argentina
  - Miss Grand Argentina
- Bolivia
  - Miss Bolivia
- Brazil
  - Miss Brazil
  - Miss Brazil World
  - Miss Earth Brazil
  - Miss Grand Brazil
- Chile
  - Miss Universo Chile
  - Miss Internacional Chile
  - Miss Earth Chile
  - Miss World Chile
  - Miss Grand Chile
- Colombia
  - Miss Colombia
  - Miss Mundo Colombia
  - Miss Earth Colombia
  - Miss Universe Colombia
  - Miss Grand Colombia
- Ecuador
  - Miss Ecuador
  - Miss Earth Ecuador
  - Concurso Nacional de Belleza Ecuador
  - Miss Teen Ecuador
  - Miss Grand Ecuador
- French Guiana
  - Miss French Guiana
- Guyana
  - Miss Guyana
  - Miss Universe Guyana
  - Miss Earth Guyana
- Paraguay
  - Miss Paraguay
  - Reinas del Paraguay
  - Miss Grand Paraguay
- Peru
  - Miss Peru
  - Miss Grand Peru
- Suriname
  - Miss Suriname
- Uruguay
  - Miss Uruguay
- Venezuela
  - Miss Venezuela
  - Miss Earth Venezuela
  - Miss Grand Venezuela

==== Former states ====
- Serbia and Montenegro (before 2006)
  - Miss Serbia and Montenegro
- (Socialist Federal Republic of Yugoslavia) / (Serbia and Montenegro) Yugoslavia (before 2002)
  - Miss Yugoslavia
- Czechoslovakia (before 1993)
  - Miss Czechoslovakia
- USSR (before 1991)
  - Miss USSR
- Union of South Africa (before 1981)
  - Miss RSA
- Rhodesia (before 1980)
  - Miss Rhodesia
- Rhodesia and Nyasaland (before 1963)
  - Miss Rhodesia and Nyasaland
- Siam (before 1938)
  - Miss Siam

== Men's pageants ==
=== International competitions ===
Major

The following is a list of the world's premier male beauty pageants, known as major male pageants. Six male beauty pageants are considered major competitions:

- Manhunt International (1993–2012, 2016–present)
- Mister World (1996–present, once every 2-5 years)
- Mister International (2006–present)
  - Philippines (2023–present)
  - Thailand (2023–present)
- Mister Global (2014–present)
- Mister Supranational (2016–present)
- Man of the World (2017–present)

Minor

The following is a list of minor male beauty pageants. This list is based on the year they were established.

- Mister Model International (2013–present)
- Mister Universe International (2015–present)
- Man of the Year (2016–present)
- Mister Planet (2016–present)
- Mister Tourism World (2016–present)
- Mister Grand International
  - Brazil (2016–present)
  - Asia (2017–present)
- Mister National Universe (2017–present)
- Mister Universe Tourism (2017–present)
- Mister Earth World (2018–present)
- Man of the Globe International (2019–present)
- Mister Continental World (2019–present)
- Mister Glam International (2019–present)
- Mister Tourism Globe (2019–present)
- Caballero Universal (2021–present)
- Mister Friendship International (2021–present)
- Man Hot Star International (2022–present)
- Mister Heritage (2022–present)
- Mister Universe
  - India (2022–present)
  - USA (2024–present)
- World Fitness Supermodel (2022–present)
- Great Man of the Universe (2023–present)
- Mister Celebrity International (2023–present)
- Mister Cosmopolitan (2023–present)
- Mister Culture International (2023–present)
- Mister Earth International (2023–present)
- Mister Fashion Model (2023–present)
- Mister Fitness Supermodel World (2023–present)
- Mister Tourism Intercontinental (2024–present)
- Masters of the World (2025–present)

Continental and regional

- Mister Asian International (2011–present)
- Mister Global Asian (2022–2023, 2025–present)
- Mr. Latinoamérica Internacional (2023–present)

Teen

List of teen beauty pageants:

- Mister Teen World (2003–present)
- Mister Teenager Universe (2024–present)

Discontinued

- Mr. Europe (1993–1998)
- Mr. Joven Internacional (1993–1999)
- Mr. Scandinavia (1997–2003)
- Hombre Internacional (1998–2002)
- Male International Model (1998–2005)
- Mister Handsome International (1998–2019)
- Mister Intercontinental (1998–2005, 2007–2009, 2011)
- Mr. International (1998–2003)
- Mister Continents (1999–2003)
- Mister Young International (2000–2014)
- Mister Tourism International (2001–2002, 2010–2015)
- Mister Latino International (2002–2004)
- Mister Model Millenium (2003)
- Mister Teen Continents (2002–2003)
- Mister Tourism Universe (2002–2005)
- International Best Male Model of the World (2003)
- Axe Men World Male Model (2004)
- Mister Teen Model World (2004)
- Zeus of the World (2004)
- Mister Continentes del Mundo (2005–2016)
- Mister Expo World (2005–2020)
- Mister Mundial (2005–2014)
- Mister Pacific of the World (2006–2018)
- World Most Beautiful Bum (2007–2008)
- Mister Sea World (2008–2019)
- Men Universe Model (2008–2019)
- Fresh Faces (2010–2013)
- Mister Teen Jade Universe (2010–2018)
- Mister Jade Universe (2010–2018)
- Mister Pacífico y el Caribe (2012–2015)
- Mister Universo Mundial (2012–2019)
- Mister América Internacional (2013–2019)
- Mister Mesoamérica International (2013–2019)
- Mister Teen Mesoamérica Universe (2013–2017)
- Mr. Joven Mesoamérica International (2014–2019)
- Mister Real Universe (2014–2019)
- Mister Teen América International (2014–2019)
- Mister Teen Earth (2014–2022)
- Mister Global Teen (2015–2018)
- Mister United Continents (2015–2018)
- Mister Universal Ambassador (2015–2019)
- Mister Model Universe (2015–2019)
- Mister Globe (2015–2021)
- Mister Grand International (Philippines) (2017–2018)
- Mister Trifinio Mundo Internacional (2017–2019)
- Mister Tourism and Culture Universe (2018–2019)
- Mister United World (2018–2019)
- Mister Working Men International (2019)
- Man of the Earth (2021–2022)

=== National ===
==== Africa ====
- Egypt
  - Mister Egypt
- Nigeria
  - Mr Nigeria
  - Misters of Nigeria
- South Africa
  - Mister South Africa

==== Asia ====
- Cambodia
  - Mister Cambodia
- China
  - Hong Kong
    - Mr. Hong Kong
- India
  - Mister India World
  - Mister Supranational India
  - Gladrags Manhunt
  - Rubaru Mister India
  - Grasim Mr. India
  - Alee Club
- Indonesia
  - The New L-Men of The Year
  - Putera Indonesia
  - Mister Indonesia
  - Mister Global Indonesia
- Japan
  - Mister Japan
- South Korea
  - Mister Korea
  - Mister International Korea
  - Mister World Korea
- Laos
  - Mister Laos
- Lebanon
  - Mister Lebanon
- Philippines
  - Manhunt International Philippines
  - Mister Pilipinas Worldwide
  - Mr World Philippines
- Taiwan
  - Mister Taiwan
- Thailand
  - Mister Supranational Thailand
- Vietnam
  - Mister Fitness Supermodel Vietnam
  - Mister Vietnam
  - Mr World Vietnam
  - The Next Gentleman

==== Europe ====
- Czech Republic
  - Muž Roku
- Poland
  - Mister Polski
- Slovakia
  - Mister Slovak Republic
- Spain
  - Mister Spain
  - RNB España

==== North America ====
- Canada
  - Mr World Canada
- Dominican Republic
  - Mister Dominican Republic
- El Salvador
  - Mister El Salvador
- Mexico
  - Mr World Mexico
  - Mr Model México
  - Mister México
- Puerto Rico
  - Misters of Puerto Rico
- United States
  - Mister USA

==== South America ====
- Brazil
  - Mister Brazil
- Ecuador
  - Mister Ecuador
- Peru
  - Mister Peru
- Venezuela
  - Mister Venezuela

== LGBTQIA+ & Deaf pageants ==
=== International ===
Here is the following list of the largest international LGBTQIA+ competitions in pageantry.

- Miss International Queen (2004–present)
- Mister Gay World (2009–present)
- Miss Star International (2010–present)
- Miss T World (2017–present)
- Miss Trans Global (2020–present)
- Miss Equality World (2022–present)
- Mister Bear International (2024–present)
- Mr Gay Universe (2025–present)

Here is the following list of the largest international deaf competitions in pageantry.

- Miss & Mister Deaf World (2001–present)
- Miss & Mister Deaf International (2010–present)
- Mister Deaf Universum (2014–present)

Continental and regional

- Mister Gay Europe (2005–present)

Discontinued

- Mr. Gay International (2005–2012)
- Super Sireyna Worldwide (2014, 2018)
- Best Model of the World (1990–2021)
- Miss Fabulous International (2022–2023)

=== National ===
==== Africa ====
- South Africa
  - Mr Gay World South Africa

==== Asia ====
- Cambodia
  - Miss Queen Cambodia
- India
  - Mr. Gay India
  - Miss Transqueen India
- Israel
  - Miss Trans Israel
- Pakistan
  - Miss Trans Pakistan
- Philippines
  - Miss Gay Philippines
  - Mr. Gay World Philippines
- Thailand
  - Miss Tiffany's Universe
  - Miss Fabulous Thailand
- Turkey
  - Best Model of Turkey
- Vietnam
  - Miss International Queen Vietnam

==== Europe ====
- Albania
  - Miss Trans Albania
- Ireland
  - Mr Gay Ireland
- Sweden
  - Mr Gay Sweden
- United Kingdom
  - Mr Gay UK
  - Wales
    - Mr Gay Wales

==== Americas ====
- Chile
  - Mister Gay Chile
- Mexico
  - Miss Trans México
- United States
  - All American Goddess
  - Best in Drag Show
  - La Femme Magnifique International Pageant
  - Miss Continental
  - Miss'd America
  - Miss Gay America
  - Miss Gay USofA
  - National Entertainer of the Year
  - International Ms. Leather
  - International Mr. Leather

==== Oceania ====
- American Samoa
  - Miss Island Queen Pageant
- Tonga
  - Miss Galaxy Pageant

== See also ==
- Lists of awards
