= Sergio Floccari =

Italian footballer

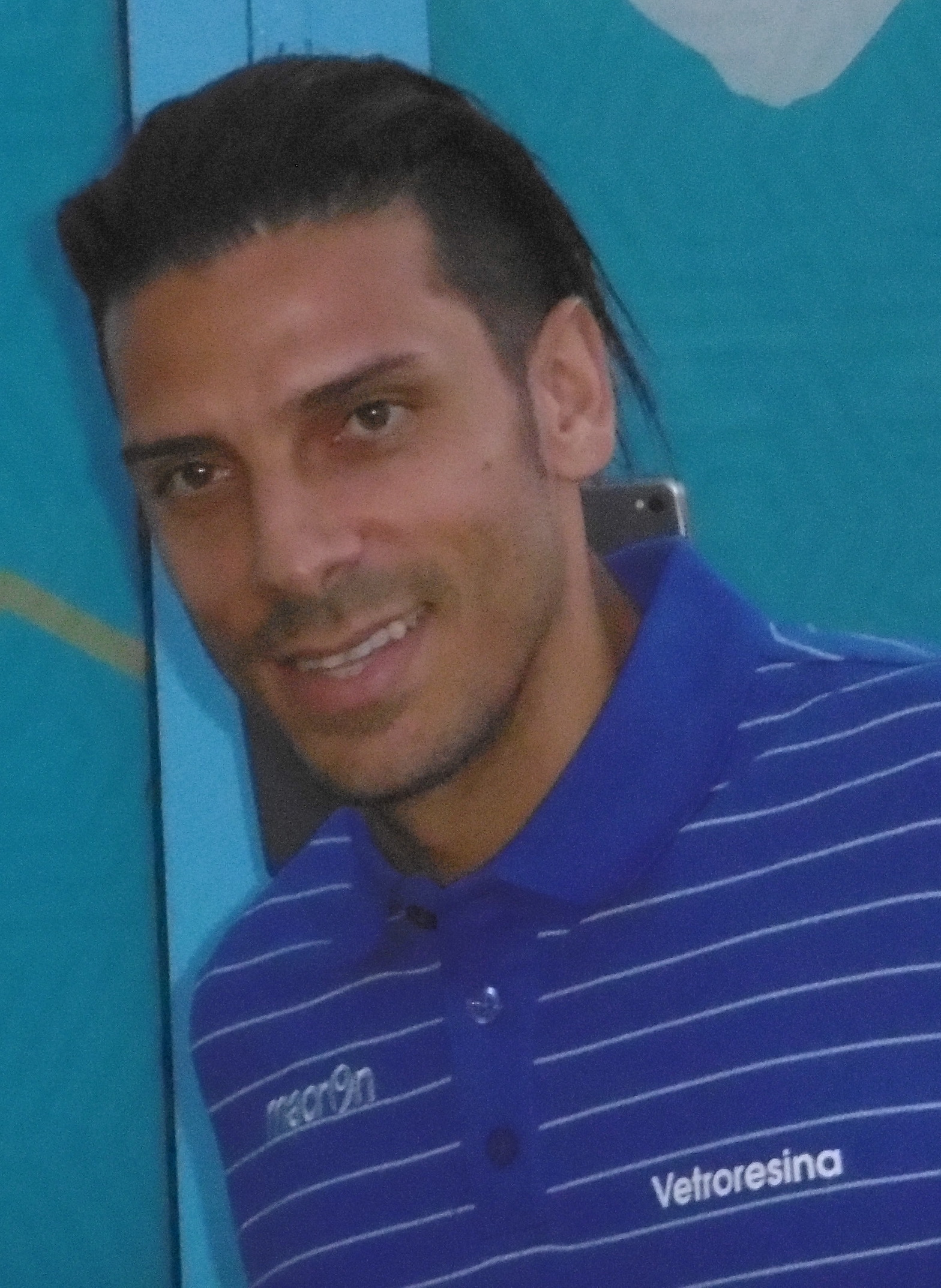

Personal information
- Full name: Sergio Floccari
- Date of birth: 12 November 1981 (age 45)
- Place of birth: Vibo Valentia, Italy
- Height: 1.82 m (6 ft 0 in)
- Position: Striker

Youth career
- Nicotera
- Catanzaro

Senior career*
Years	Team	Apps	(Gls)
1997–1998	Avezzano	11	(1)
1998–2000	Montebelluna	3	(0)
2000–2002	Mestre	4	(0)
2001–2002	→ Faenza (loan)	33	(10)
2002–2003	Genoa	9	(1)
2003–2006	Rimini	89	(21)
2006–2007	Messina	45	(5)
2007–2009	Atalanta	67	(20)
2009–2010	Genoa	11	(4)
2010	→ Lazio (loan)	17	(8)
2010–2014	Lazio	66	(13)
2011–2012	→ Parma (loan)	28	(8)
2014–2016	Sassuolo	50	(7)
2016–2017	Bologna	23	(2)
2017–2021	SPAL	103	(15)
- * Club domestic league appearances and goals as of 10 May 2021

Sergio Floccari (Italian pronunciation: [ˈsɛrdʒo ˈflɔkkari]; born 12 November 1981) is a former Italian footballer who played as a striker.

== Club career ==
=== Early career ===
Floccari began playing football as a junior with the local side of his town, Nicotera, before moving into the youth system of Catanzaro. He began senior career with Avezzano and Promozione team Montebelluna before moving up to Serie C2 with Mestre and Faenza. It was at Faenza, under coach Carlo Regno, assistant to 2009–10 Lazio coach Davide Ballardini, that Floccari first bloomed, scoring many goals.

=== Rise ===
Following his successful period at Faenza, he joined Genoa in 2002, but did not establish himself as a regular, playing just nine league games and scoring one goal in his first season of Serie B.

Floccari took a step back into Serie C2, joining Rimini in co-ownership deal where he played and scored regularly. His goals contributed to successful promotions as Rimini went from playing in C2 to Serie B during his time there. The club also bought him outright in June 2003.

In January 2006, Floccari's form was rewarded when Serie A strugglers Messina signed him (jointly-signed with Atalanta from Rimini) as they looked to avoid relegation. Floccari scored three times as Messina survived thanks to the Calciopoli scandal. Two of those goals came in a 2–2 draw with Juventus. In June 2006, Messina bought the remain rights from Atalanta. In his first full season of Serie A in 2006–07, Floccari scored only twice as Messina finished last.

=== Atalanta ===
The Calabrese striker did not return to Serie B with his Messina teammates though. Atalanta re-signed him for a fee of €1.875 million (€1.675 million plus defender Mariano Stendardo).

At Atalanta, Floccari battled for a starting place with the likes of Simone Inzaghi, Antonio Langella and Riccardo Zampagna. Floccari scored his first goal against league champions Inter and after Zampagna's bust-up with coach Luigi Delneri (which resulted in the striker's departure to Vicenza Calcio), Floccari's first-team opportunities increased, and he closed out the 2007–08 season with eight league goals.

In 2008–09, Floccari improved yet again, scoring twelve league goals as Atalanta comfortably finished in mid table.

=== Return to Genoa ===
On 1 July 2009, Floccari returned to Genoa, the club he left in 2003, for €9.1 million. He scored on debut in a 4–1 win over Napoli and scored his first goal in the Europa League against Valencia. Having scored four league goals, Floccari was struggling to find space in the Genoa attack with coach Gian Piero Gasperini preferring the likes of Giuseppe Sculli and Raffaele Palladino. That transfer windows also saw a three-men three-way swap formed, which Floccari moved to Lazio to replace Goran Pandev who left for Inter on free transfer, and Genoa got David Suazo from Inter.

=== Lazio ===
The three strikers were all unsuccessful in the first half of the season. As a result, Floccari sealed a loan move to struggling Lazio, for €500,000. He made his debut after just one training session and scored twice in a 4–1 win over Livorno. Following that, Floccari made a surprising impact on the team, and was one of the key players in guiding the club to 12th in the league, well clear of the relegation zone. He missed a vital penalty in the defeat against Roma in the vital derby, but made up for it by scoring the winner against former club Genoa seven days later, a result that all but granted Lazio's Serie A status for 2010–11. At the end of season Lazio signed him permanently for a €8.5 million transfer fee having agreed a four-year contract.

=== Parma ===
On 31 August 2011, Floccari was loaned to Parma for €1.5 million with the option to buy set at €1.5 million After an injury to start the season, he scored his first goal for the club on 18 December, the opener in a match against Lecce that ended 3-3. He also scored a brace against his parent club Lazio in a match that ended 3-1 on 31 March 2012. Parma did not activate his buy clause however so he returned to Rome in the summer of 2012.

=== Return to Lazio ===
The new Lazio coach Vladimir Petković did not initially prefer Floccari, only occasionally using him. However, he began playing more often after December, scoring a goal against Atalanta in a 2-0 win on 13 January 2013 and also in the following match against Palermo. He also scored a 93rd minute winner against Juventus in the Copa Italia semifinal, making the score 2-1 to Lazio. The team would then go on to beat Roma in the final 1-0.

=== Sassuolo ===
On 30 January 2014, Floccari was sold to fellow Serie A club Sassuolo for €2 million.

=== Bologna ===
On 11 January 2016, Floccari officially joined Serie A club Bologna for an undisclosed fee. He missed three weeks of the 2016–17 season through injury.

=== SPAL ===
On 19 January 2017, Floccari signed a one-year deal with Serie B side SPAL. Two days later, he made his debut for the club in a 2–0 league win over Benevento. Floccari's first goal in a SPAL shirt came in stoppage time to seal the victory for the home side, after defender Francesco Vicari gave them the lead just before the break. On 13 April 2019, he scored the winner in a shock 2–1 victory over reigning champions Juventus.

== International career ==
In October 2010, he was called up for the first and only time by new national team coach Cesare Prandelli for the Euro 2012 qualifiers against Northern Ireland and Serbia, as a replacement for the injured Alberto Gilardino; he didn't make an appearance in either game. Floccari married former Miss San Marino Maria Elisa Canti, and has Sammarinese citizenship, so is eligible for the San Marino national football team.

== Career statistics ==
=== Club ===
As of match played 2 August 2020.

Club	Season	League			Cup		Continental		Total		Ref.
Club	Season	Division	Apps	Goals	Apps	Goals	Apps	Goals	Apps	Goals	Ref.
Italy		League			Coppa Italia		Europe		Total		–
Avezzano	1997–98	Serie C2	11	1	?	?			11	1	
Montebelluna	1998–99	Promozione	3	0	?	?			3	0	
Mestre	1999–2000	Serie C2	0	0	?	?			0	0	
Mestre	2000–01	Serie C2	4	0	?	?			4	0	
Mestre	Total		4	0	0	0	0	0	4	0	–
Faenza (loan)	2001–02	Serie C2	33	10	?	?			33	10	
Genoa	2002–03	Serie B	9	1	2	0			11	1	
Rimini	2002–03	Serie C2	13	2					13	2^{1}	
Rimini	2003–04	Serie C1	24	10	?	?			24	10^{2}	
Rimini	2004–05	Serie C1	31	7	3	0			34	7	
Rimini	2005–06	Serie B	18	2	2	0			20	2	
Rimini	Total		86	21	5	0	0	0	91	21	–
Messina	2005–06	Serie A	18	3					18	3	
Messina	2006–07	Serie A	27	2	4	0			31	2	
Messina	Total		45	5	4	0	0	0	49	5	–
Atalanta	2007–08	Serie A	34	8	1	0			35	8	
Atalanta	2008–09	Serie A	33	12	1	0			34	12	
Atalanta	Total		67	20	2	0	0	0	69	20	–
Genoa	2009–10	Serie A	11	4	0	0	4	1	15	5	
Lazio (loan)	2009–10	Serie A	17	8	1	1			18	9	
Lazio	2010–11	Serie A	30	8	1	0			31	8	
Lazio	2012–13	Serie A	22	5	4	1	10	4	36	10	
Lazio	2013–14	Serie A	14	0	1	0	6	4	21	4	
Lazio	Total		66	13	6	1	16	8	88	22	–
Parma (loan)	2011–12	Serie A	28	8	0	0	0	0	28	8	
Sassuolo	2013–14	Serie A	15	1	0	0	0	0	15	1	
Sassuolo	2014–15	Serie A	27	2	2	0	0	0	29	2	
Sassuolo	2014–15	Serie A	7	4	0	0	0	0	7	4	
Sassuolo	Total		49	7	2	0	0	0	51	7	–
Bologna	2015–16	Serie A	18	2	0	0	0	0	15	2	
Bologna	2016–17	Serie A	5	0	0	0	0	0	5	0	
Bologna	Total		23	2	0	0	0	0	23	2	–
SPAL	2016–17	Serie B	16	7	0	0			16	7	
SPAL	2017–18	Serie A	20	3	1	0			21	3	
SPAL	2018–19	Serie A	23	3	1	1			24	4	
SPAL	2019–20	Serie A	24	1	1	1			25	2	
SPAL	Total		83	14	3	2	0	0	86	16	–
Career total			535	114	25	4^{3}	20	9	581	137	–

^{1} 1 match in 2002–03 playoffs
^{2} 2 matches in 2003–04 playoffs
^{3} Not included match in Coppa Italia Lega Pro and regional cups
^{4} Note 1, 2 and 3

== Honours ==
Lazio

- Coppa Italia: 2012–13
