= International Professional Rodeo Association =

- Sport: Rodeo
- Founded: 1957
- Countries: United States; Canada
- Most recent champions: (United States) Justin Thigpen, All-Around
- Website: ipra-rodeo.com

The International Professional Rodeo Association (IPRA) is the second-largest rodeo organization and largest semi-professional rodeo organization in the world. It sanctions events in the United States and Canada, with members from said countries, as well as others. Its championship event is the International Finals Rodeo (IFR), held every January. The IPRA is headquartered in Oklahoma City, Oklahoma.

== History ==
The organization was formed in 1957 as the Interstate Rodeo Association. At the end of that same year, it named its first world champions. However, world champions would not be crowned again until 1960.

In 1961, it became the first rodeo organization to recognize cowgirls' barrel racing as a world championship event in a predominantly male rodeo.

In 1964, the Interstate Rodeo Association changed its name to the International Rodeo Association. That same year, it set its headquarters in Pauls Valley, Oklahoma, and created a Board of Governors, which consisted of performers, producers, fans, contestants, and contractors.

In February 1971, the association debuted the International Finals Rodeo (IFR) to determine the world champions in each rodeo event. It was the finals event for the 1970 season, and was held at the Tulsa Assembly Center in Tulsa, Oklahoma, where it remained the home of the IFR through 1973. In 1974, the IFR relocated to Tingley Coliseum in Albuquerque, New Mexico. In 1975, the event returned to Tulsa, where it remained through 1990. After the IFR celebrated its 20th anniversary, the association announced that they had signed a multi-year agreement with the Oklahoma City All Sports Association to hold the event in the city's Myriad Convention Center beginning in January 1991. In 1997, the IFR moved to Oklahoma City's State Fair Arena where it took place through 2002. The city's recently opened Ford Center hosted the IFR in 2003. The event then returned to the State Fair Arena in 2004, where it remained through 2019. The IFR moved to the Lazy E Arena in Guthrie, Oklahoma, in 2020 during its 50th year, where it remains today.

In 1983, the organization was renamed the International Professional Rodeo Association (IPRA).

In April 1993, the IPRA changed its Pauls Valley, Oklahoma, headquarters to Oklahoma City, adjacent to the city's historic stockyards.

In 2009, the IPRA began to sanction events in eastern Canada.

In 2023, the IPRA was acquired by Rodeo Logistics.

== Events ==
- Bareback bronc riding
- Breakaway roping
- Steer wrestling
- Team roping
- Saddle bronc riding
- Tie-down roping
- Barrel racing
- Bull riding

== Organization ==
The IPRA has been sanctioning rodeos for over 60 years in cities of all sizes. It sanctions almost 300 rodeos throughout the country, making it the second largest organization in the sport. It is also the largest rodeo organization specific to semi-professional contestants. The association is headquartered in Oklahoma City, Oklahoma.

Montana Silversmiths partners with the IPRA and provides their belt buckles and is recognized as the "Official Silversmiths of the IPRA."

The IPRA is registered on Bloomberg.

The IPRA announced on August 28, 2019, that the IFR would now be held at the Lazy E Arena in Guthrie, Oklahoma.

From 2016 through 2023, the IFR was streamed live on the now-defunct Wrangler Network website and app. Since 2024, it is streamed live on the NextGen Rodeo app.

== Miss Rodeo USA ==
The Miss Rodeo USA pageant is held at the IFR every year. The Miss Rodeo USA Association has represented the IFR for six decades.

== See also ==
- Lists of rodeo performers
- Professional Rodeo Cowboys Association
- ProRodeo Hall of Fame
- Bull Riding Hall of Fame
- Professional Bull Riders
- American Bucking Bull
- Bull Riders Only
- Championship Bull Riding
- Women's Professional Rodeo Association
- Canadian Professional Rodeo Association
