= Rodeo queen =

Female representative and "face" of the sport

The Timberbowl Rodeo Queen at the Methow Valley Rodeo in Winthrop, Washington.

A rodeo queen is a female representative and "face" of the sport of rodeo. She represents her rodeo, association, or region for a standard time of usually 12 months and is usually required to wear a cowboy hat, crown, and sash with her title on it. Being a rodeo queen requires skills in western style horse riding, public speaking, rodeo knowledge, appearance, and personality. Rodeo Queens spend their time professionally representing their title at various rodeos, parades, public events, television interviews, radio interviews, school events, and charity events.

There are four nationwide pageants in the United States, Miss Rodeo America, Miss Rodeo USA, the National Little Britches Rodeo Association Royalty, and the National High School Rodeo Association Queen Contest. In addition, most states have their own pageants. There are a number of qualifying pageants, local pageants, and contests for specific rodeo events. Australia also hosts rodeo queens, and Canada has numerous pageants as well as a national title. Rodeo associations can also hold queen pageants and crown rodeo queens, such as Miss Rodeo New York and Miss Pennsylvania High School Rodeo Queen.

Most pageants require contestants to be single, childless, unmarried, under a certain age, and female. The most common major categories are appearance, horsemanship, knowledge, and personality, with a number of subcategories. The winner is usually chosen from a field of multiple contestants and judged by a panel of qualified judges in each event. The young lady with the most points will win the title.

== See also ==
- Indian princess – a similar title at pow wows
