= Miss Scuba International =

International beauty pageant

- Formation: 2011
- Type: Beauty Pageant
- Purpose: Marine Conservation
- Headquarters: Kota Kinabalu
- Location: Malaysia
- Official language: English
- President: Datuk Robert Lo
- Slogan: Saving the Oceans through Beauty
- Current titleholder: Christina Zhang Rui; China
- Website: http://www.missscuba.org/

Miss Scuba International is an international beauty pageant that was first held in 2011 in Sipadan Mabul Resort, Malaysia and has since become a global event that raises awareness about ocean health and marine conservation.

The current titleholder is Christina Zhang Rui from China. She was crowned Miss Scuba International 2024 at Port View Palace, Hakka Hall, Kota Kinabalu, Malaysia, on November 30, 2024.

== History ==
The pageant was established by Datuk Robert Lo, owner of the Mabul Water Bungalows and Sipadan-Mabul Resort (SMART). Lo, a marine mammal specialist and advocate for sustainable development, founded the pageant with the aim of inspiring the protection of the oceans and the planet. The event emphasizes both the beauty and resilience of women, while also promoting safe diving practices.

Since its inception in 2011, contestants from Europe, the United States, and Malaysia have participated in its two seasons, which have been regarded as highly successful. Miss Scuba International also promotes safe diving practices through collaboration with professional training organizations worldwide. Titleholders participate in an intensive campaign aimed at educating the public on ocean conservation. The pageant aims to raise awareness about the fragility of the oceans and the importance of their protection, with a focus on marine and ocean conservation.

== Titleholders ==
This is the complete list of countries and territories that have won the crown through the years.

Editions	Year	Miss Scuba International	Runner-ups		Venue	Entrants	Ref.
Editions	Year	Miss Scuba International	First	Second	Venue	Entrants	Ref.
12th	2025	Czech Republic; Anna Dvorakova	United States; Kimber Lynn Collins	Costa Rica; Anumi Sassaroli Oriana	Port View Palace, Hakka Hall, Kota Kinabalu	18	
11th	2024	China; Christina Zhang Rui	United States; Rachel Novak	United Kingdom; Jessica Higgins	Port View Palace, Hakka Hall, Kota Kinabalu	15	
10th	2023	United Kingdom; Hayley Louise Adlam	United States; Alysha Brooke Costa	South Korea; Park Hayan	Sutera Harbour Resort, Kota Kinabalu	23	
2020–2022 Cancelled due to the COVID-19 pandemic.
9th	2019	Australia; Michaela Shuttleworth	Indonesia; Anavaliza Admatja	Philippines; Flordeliz Mabao	Sutera Harbor Resort, Kota Kinabalu, Malaysia	22	
8th	2018	United Kingdom; Daisy Whetlor	Taiwan; Dami Huang	Philippines; Noelle Fuentes Uy-Tuazon	Magellan Sutera Resort, Kota Kinabalu, Malaysia	21	
7th	2017	United States; Brittany Anne Novick	United Kingdom; Alexandra Prior	Latvia; Magda Jentgena	Magellan Grand Ballroom, Sutera Harbour Resort, Malaysia	16	
6th	2016	India; Varsha Rajkhowa	Philippines; Meryl Angeline King	China; Sun Zitong	Kota Kinabalu, Malaysia	16	
5th	2015	Philippines; Cindy Pacia Madduma	Venezuela; Kiara Aiello	United States; Tessa Ptacek	Kota Kinabalu, Malaysia	18	
4th	2014	United States; Tabitha Lipkin	Thailand; Cattaleya Schulze	Ireland; Amber Ryan Marie Gamble	Magellan Sutera Hotel, Kota Kinabalu	14	
3rd	2013	United Kingdom; Jaime-Lee Faulkner	Philippines; Christine Bernasor	United States; Chanel Hason	Sutera Harbor Country Club, Kota Kinabalu, Malaysia	15	
2nd	2012	Thailand; Jamie Piyada Monmaneerat	Indonesia; Yovita Ayu Liwanuru	United States; Ashlee Smith	Bali, Indonesia	20	
1st	2011	Indonesia; Dayu Prastini Hatmanti	Indonesia; Nendy Yunizar	Malaysia; Jia Jie Lee	Sipadan Mabul Resort, Malaysia	15	

Countries/Territories by number of wins
Country/Territory	Titles	Year(s)
United Kingdom	3	2013, 2018, 2023
United States	2	2014, 2017
Czech Republic	1	2025
China	1	2024
Australia	1	2019
India	1	2016
Philippines	1	2015
Thailand	1	2012
Indonesia	1	2011

Continents by number of wins
Continents	Titles	Country (Number)
Americas	2	United States (2)
Europe	4	United Kingdom (3), Czech Republic (1)
Asia	5	Indonesia (1), Thailand (1), Philippines (1), India (1), China (1)
Africa	0	
Oceania	1	Australia (1)

== See also ==
- List of beauty pageants
