= World Muslimah =

International beauty pageant

- Logo of Miss World Muslimah
- Formation: August 1, 2010; 16 years ago
- Type: Beauty pageant
- Headquarters: Jakarta
- Location: Indonesia
- Official language: English; Arabic
- Key people: Eka Shanty
- Website: worldmuslimah.org wm-foundation.org

World Muslimah, also known as Miss World Muslimah (Arabic: ملكة جمال العالم مسلمه; Persian: دوشیزه جهان مسلمان), is an international beauty pageant and awards event for young Muslim women who are judged to have shown dedication, reputation and concern for Islamic values and community development. The event is run as an international charity event by the World Muslimah Foundation (WMF) to benefit relief of Muslim women in food crises, wars, conflicts and natural disasters.

The first World Muslimah Award was held online at 1 August 2010, and the first Grand Final was held 13 September in the same year.

The requirements are designed to be different from those of pageants like Miss World. Contestants are required to demonstrate religious piety, to be positive role models and show a life of Muslim spirituality.

== The pageant ==
The contest was first held in 2010 and was then only open to Indonesians, but it was later opened up to international entrants. Before entering the World Muslim selection, the 20 finalists have to come to Jakarta, Indonesia to participate in a workshop which is divided into two themes.

- Sholeha (pious) and Smart: participants focus on spiritual subjects including Quran memorization, the development of humanitarian intelligence, the challenges of Islam, woman and their future development, and being the best wife and mother in Islam.
- Healthy, Wealthy, and Beauty: participants are briefed about fashion photography, fun walk, public speaking, presentation skills, fashion, beauty, style, and stage performance.

Recitation of Quran, along with performing both compulsory prayers and gaining more knowledge of Islam, are the finalists' daily activities during the duration of the event, even more so outside the event, because finalists are intended to be exemplary models of the ideal Muslimah.

=== World Muslimah Foundation ===
The pageant is organized by the World Muslimah Foundation (WMF), a Muslim women's organization found in 2010.

=== Winning categories ===
Winners are announced in the following categories during the event:

1. Winner Miss World Muslimah
2. 1st Runner-Up World Muslimah
3. 2nd Runner-Up World Muslimah
4. The Best Al Qur'an Recitation
5. The Most Talented Muslimah
6. The World Netizen Muslimah
7. The Most Favorite World Muslimah (online vote)
8. The Most Inspiring Video Profile (online vote)

=== Titleholders ===
Year	Country/Territory	Titleholder	Location	Host Country	National title	No. of Entrants
2025	TBA	TBA	Ankara	Turkey	TBA	TBA
2024	France	Sylvie Eberena	Amman	Jordan	Miss World Muslimah France	88
2023	India	Muskan Khan	New Delhi	India	Miss World Muslimah India	78
2022	Bangladesh	Shaheda Aktar Chowdhury	Istanbul	Turkey	Miss World Muslimah Bangladesh	76
2021	United States	Mahya Mirshadeghi	Dubai (virtual Pageant)	United Arab Emirates	World Muslimah USA	68
2020	Indonesia	Iin Marlinah Medina	Beirut	Lebanon	Muslimah World Indonesia	74
2019	New Zealand	Nurul Zuriantie Shamsul	Samarkand	Uzbekistan	Miss World Muslimah New Zealand	71
2018	Malaysia	Shaidatul Naseha Uyaina Arshad	Tangier	Morocco	Muslimah World Malaysia	63
2017	India	Rojmina Patel Morecambe	Kuala Lumpur	Malaysia	Miss World Muslimah India	50
2016	Great Britain	Farhia Ali	Singapore	Singapore	Muslimah World Britain	66
2015	Singapore	Nur Hafiza Binte Osman	Singapore	Singapore	Muslimah World Singapore	52
2014	Tunisia	Fatma Ben Guefrache	Yogyakarta	Indonesia	Muslimah World Tunisia	18
2013	Nigeria	Obabiyi Aishah Ajibolaa	Yogyakarta	Indonesia	Muslimah World Nigeria	20
2012	Indonesia	Nina Septiani	Jakarta	Indonesia	Muslimah World Indonesia	20
2011	Indonesia	Dika Restiyanti	Jakarta	Indonesia	Muslimah World Indonesia	20
2010	Great Britain	Shanna Bukhari	Jakarta	Indonesia	Muslimah World Britain	24

== Country/Territory and number of wins ==
Country/Territory	Titles	Year(s)
Indonesia	3	2011, 2012, 2020
India	2	2017, 2023
Great Britain	2	2010, 2016
France	1	2024
Bangladesh	1	2022
United States	1	2021
New Zealand	1	2019
Malaysia	1	2018
Singapore	1	2015
Tunisia	1	2014
Nigeria	1	2013

== See also ==
- List of beauty contests
