= Yvonne Ryding =

Swedish model (born 1962)

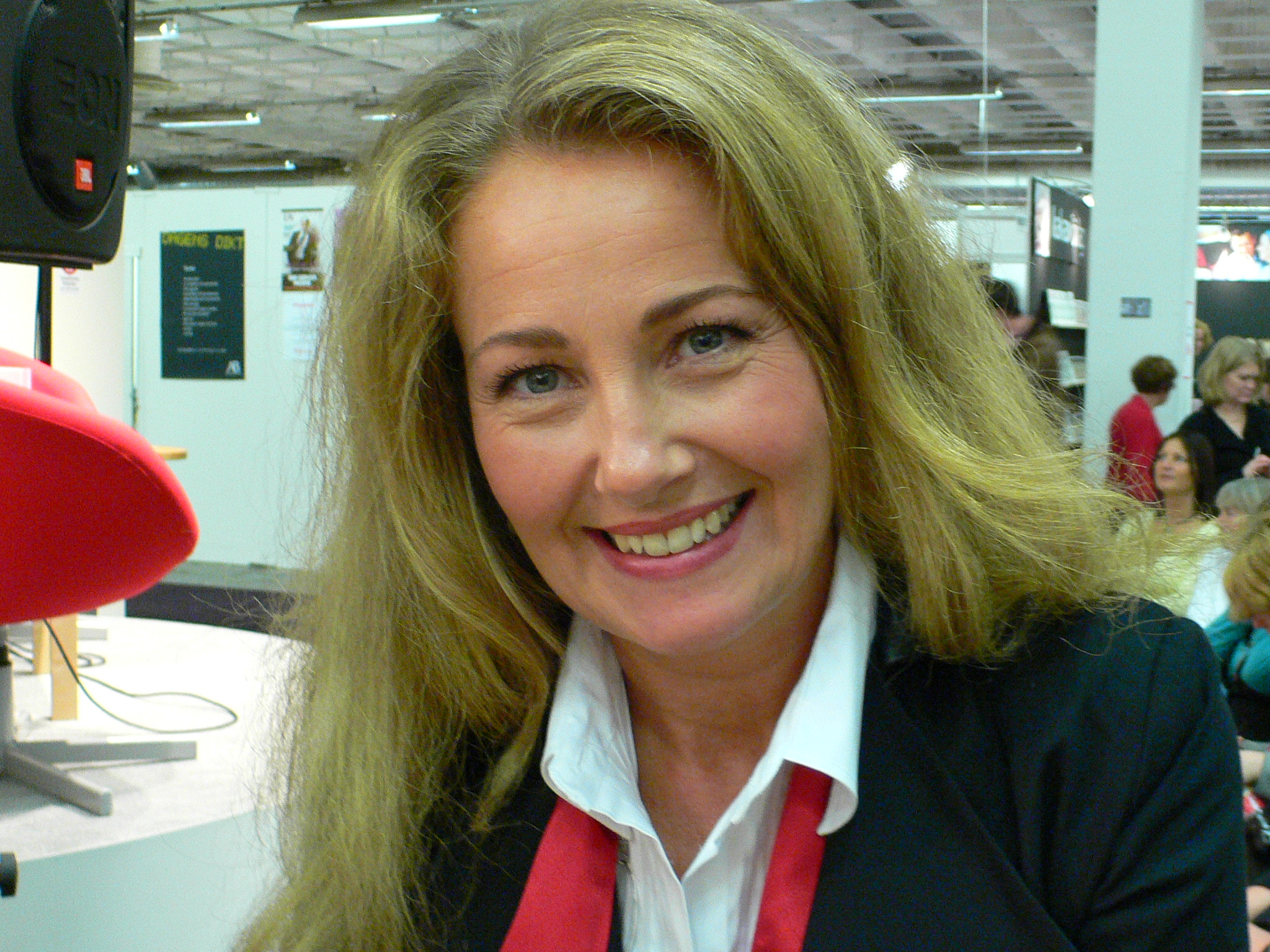
- Ryding in 2007
- Born: Yvonne Ryding; 14 December 1962 (age 63); Eskilstuna, Sweden
- Height: 1.70 m (5 ft 7 in)
- Spouse: Kjell Bergqvist (m. 1988; div. 2000)
- Children: 2
- Beauty pageant titleholder
- Title: Fröken Sverige 1984; Miss Universe 1984
- Hair color: Blonde
- Eye color: Blue
- Major competitions: Fröken Sverige 1984 (Winner); Miss Universe 1984 (Winner)

Yvonne Agneta Ryding (born 14 December 1962) is a Swedish TV host, dancer, model and beauty queen who was crowned Miss Universe 1984 on 9 July 1984. She is the third Swede in history to win the title, and the most recent one.

== Early life ==
She was born to Agneta and Sten Ryding in Eskilstuna, Sweden. Prior to being crowned Miss Sweden and competing in the Miss Universe pageant, Ryding was a Swedish National Lucia Bride, formerly a midfield soccer player, and nurse.

== After Miss Universe ==
Following the year as Miss Universe, Ryding worked within the fashion industry and also did some commission work. In 1988, her homesickness got the upper hand and she moved back to Sweden. In 1989 she presented the Swedish singing competition Melodifestivalen. In 1997, she launched her skincare line originally called Y. Ryding. She was a guest of honor at the Miss Universe 2006 competition, held in Los Angeles, United States.

She is divorced from Swedish actor Kjell Bergqvist, whom she met in Monaco in 1986. The couple has two daughters. In 2007, Ryding competed against eleven other Swedish celebrities in the television dance contest Let's Dance, and was eliminated on 23 February.

She participated in Farmen VIP 2018 which was broadcast on TV4.

== See also ==
- Miss Sweden

Awards and achievements
Preceded by (New Zealand) Lorraine Downes	Miss Universe; 1984	Succeeded by (Puerto Rico) Deborah Carthy Deu
Preceded by Viveka Miriam Jung	Fröken Sverige; 1984	Succeeded by Carina Marklund
