= Miss Cosmo World =

Beauty pageant

- Formation: 2017
- Founded at: Kuala Lumpur, Malaysia
- Type: Beauty pageant
- Headquarters: Kuala Lumpur
- Location: Malaysia
- Official language: English
- Founder: Carrie Lee Sze Kei
- Current titleholder: Valeria Sizova; Australia
- Website: www.misscosmoworld.org

Miss CosmoWorld is an annual international beauty pageant established in 2017 and based in Malaysia. It is organized by a former beauty queen and entrepreneur Carrie Lee Sze Kei.

The current titleholder of Miss CosmoWorld 2024 is Valeria Sizova from Australia. This is the first time Australia has won a crown and the seventh edition of MissCosmo World. She won the title on November 20, 2024, held at St. Regis Hotel, Kuala Lumpur, Malaysia.

== History ==
Miss CosmoWorld was founded by Carrie Lee Sze Kei, winner of Miss Chinese Cosmos International Pageant in 2004. The contest established in 2006 and developed into an international beauty pageant that was based in Malaysia. In 2017, it was rebranded as Miss CosmoWorld, expanding its reach internationally.

Miss CosmoWorld is a beauty pageant that highlights Malaysia's heritage and culture on an international stage. The event emphasizes beauty, talent, and cultural expression to foster global awareness and understanding of Malaysian identity. It also focuses on women's empowerment, aiming to support and guide women in their personal and professional development. The pageant includes initiatives that provide participants with opportunities in areas such as grooming and entrepreneurship, aimed at developing skills and resources for future success.

Miss CosmoWorld has implemented projects to support past contestants in their career and personal development. The organization also focuses on promoting cultural diversity and plans to expand its initiatives.

== Titleholders ==
This is the complete list of countries and territories that have won the crown through the years.

Editions	Year	Miss CosmoWorld	Runners-up		Venue	City	Entrants	Ref.
Editions	Year	Miss CosmoWorld	First	Second	Venue	City	Entrants	Ref.
7th	2024	Australia; Valeria Sizova	Iceland; Disa Dungal	Philippines; Samantha Acosta	St. Regis Hotel	Kuala Lumpur, Malaysia	30	
6th	2023	United States; Shelby Ann Howell	Philippines; Elda Louise Aznar	Ukraine; Maryna Karpeka	St. Regis Hotel	Kuala Lumpur, Malaysia	25	
5th	2022	Philippines; Meiji Aculana Cruz	Uzbekistan; Amaliya Shakirova	Thailand; Onnapun Na Chiangmai	St. Regis Hotel	Kuala Lumpur, Malaysia	22	
4th	2020	Malaysia; Shirley Yeap (叶雪丽)	Perak; Malaysia Joyce Chao (周栋燕)	Ipoh; Malaysia Tiffany Lee (李俐吟)	St. Regis Hotel	Kuala Lumpur, Malaysia	25	
3rd	2019	India; Sandra Soman	Korea; Shin Chaein	Philippines; Jessa Mae	St. Regis Hotel	Kuala Lumpur, Malaysia	24	
2nd	2018	Indonesia; Delvia Wirajaya	Philippines; Jeanyfer Ozbot	Serbia; Milica Vuklis	JW Marriott Hotel	Kuala Lumpur, Malaysia	27	
1st	2017	Thailand; Natthapat Pongpraphan	China; Michelle Chen	Russia; Svetlana Sheyko	St. Regis Hotel	Kuala Lumpur, Malaysia	20	

Countries/Territories by number of wins
Country/Territory	Titles	Year(s)
Australia	1	2024
United States	1	2023
Philippines	1	2022
Malaysia	1	2020
India	1	2019
Indonesia	1	2018
Thailand	1	2017

== See also ==
- List of beauty pageants
