= International Christian Embassy Jerusalem =

Christian pro-Israel institution in Jerusalem

- השגרירות הנוצרית הבינלאומית ירושלים (Hebrew)
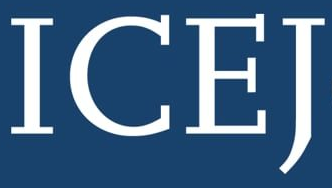
- The textual version of the logo of the ICEJ

- Location within Jerusalem
- 31.7510224°N 35.2134258°E
- Location: 38 General Pierre Koenig Street; Jerusalem

The International Christian Embassy Jerusalem (ICEJ) is a Christian Zionist organisation based in Jerusalem.

== History ==
The International Christian Embassy was founded in 1980 by evangelical Christians to express their support for the State of Israel and the Jewish people, specifically the Israeli government's enactment of the Jerusalem Law and in protest of the closure of foreign embassies in Jerusalem. The ICEJ is best known for hosting an annual Christian celebration of the Feast of Tabernacles, which attracts several thousand participants from almost 100 countries. The location and name were chosen deliberately to show that unlike other international groups, its members regard Jerusalem as the capital of the State of Israel.

The Israel and German branches of the International Christian Embassy are headed by Jürgen Bühler, son of Albert Bühler, a Wehrmacht soldier who spent years in a Russian prison camp after World War II. Bühler's father was aided by two Jewish families, who provided him with medical care and food. Sixty years later, Bühler spearheaded a campaign to raise funds for an assisted living facility for Holocaust survivors in Haifa.

The International Christian Embassy is one of the creators of the Miss Holocaust Survivor beauty pageant, held annually in Haifa, Israel.

== American Christian Leaders for Israel ==
American Christian Leaders for Israel is a project of the U.S. Branch of the International Christian Embassy Jerusalem.
