= Miss Arab World =

Annual international beauty pageant competition

- Formation: 2006; 20 years ago
- Type: Beauty pageant
- Headquarters: Cairo
- Location: Egypt
- Official language: Arabic
- Key people: Dr. Hanan Nasr (Founder, Owner & CEO of Miss Arab World; Owner of Motion Media Production); Hala Al-Madani (Manager of Motion Media Production)
- Parent organization: Motion Media Production
- Affiliations: Egyptian Ministry of Tourism
- Website: missarabworld.com

Miss Arab World (Arabic: مسابقة ملكة جمال العرب) is an annual regional beauty pageant in the Arab World. The contest seeks to select the Arab girl that best represents her country based on traditional Arab customs and traditions.

== Titleholders ==
Edition	Miss Arab World	Runners-up			
Edition	Miss Arab World	1st runner-up	2nd runner-up	3rd runner-up	4th runner-up
2006	Klodia Hana; Iraq	Dina Shalby; Egypt	Jomana Al E'eid; Syria	Not awarded	Not awarded
2007	Wafaa Yacoub; Bahrain	Shaimaa Mansour; Egypt	Abeer Laios; Lebanon	Khadija Merabet; Tunisia	Rima Al Bosiri; Libya
2008	Not Held				
2009	Mawadda Nour; Saudi Arabia	Jessy Zaher; Egypt	Rana Al Wardi; Syria	Injy Tawos; Egypt	Aliaa Alkelani; Syria
2010	Reem Al-Tunisi; Tunisia	Rawan Mousli; Saudi Arabia	Lara Al Abdlat; Jordan	Fatma Mohamed; Sudan	Zohour Elwardi; Bahrain
2011	Not Held				
2012	Nadine Fahad; Syria	Rofan Yousef; Egypt	Nadia Khalifa; Tunisia	Safa Makram; Iraq	Laden Abdullah; Somalia
2013	Mariam Morgan; Egypt	Zain Karazon; Jordan	Noura Alsayegh; Bahrain	Merna Aleek; Lebanon	Yasmeen Kamoun; Tunisia
2014	Chorouk Chelouati; Morocco				
2015	Yasmin Dakoumy; Tunisia		Mariam George; Egypt	Suzan Mohamed; Yemen	Sara Nakhla; Syria
2016	Nesrin Nobeir; Morocco	Kera Sabah; Egypt	Nelay Adnan; Syria	Aseel Alahmar; Lebanon	Nour Eldewik; Palestine
2017	Suhair El Ghadab; Tunisia	Shaima Alaraby; Morocco	Tmam Kalbona; Jordan	Sara Alhaj; Lebanon	Sophia Hesham; Sudan
2018	Sherine Hosni; Morocco	Rania Ayshoush; Algeria	Fwzia Abd Elreda; Bahrain	Fatim Alshamesy (United Arab Emirates) Emirates	Ghofran Ismael; Sudan
2019	Samara Yahia; Algeria	Loreen Amseih; Palestine	Maria Kamoun; Lebanon	Nabila Akili; Morocco	Nermen Algaafari; Yemen
2020	Elham Elmakhfy; Morocco	Norhan Ahmed; Egypt	Ahlam Sewedi (Tunisia) Tunis	Soha Zeid; Algeria	Mariam Ahmed; Iraq
2021	Mariana Al Obaidi; Iraq	Shery Abdel Hamed; Egypt	Sabreen Shahrazad; Morocco	Dara Abbas; Sudan	Sandra Ezz; Palestine
2024	Narjis Bitar Lebanon	title=Miss Arab World 2024 - Miss Arab world			

=== Titleholders by country ===
Country	Titles	Edition(s)
Morocco	4	2014, 2016, 2018, 2020,
Tunisia	3	2010, 2015, 2017
Iraq	2	2006, 2021
Bahrain	1	2007
Saudi Arabia	1	2009
Syria	1	2012
Egypt	1	2013
Algeria	1	2019
Lebanon	1	2024

== See also ==
- List of beauty pageants
