= Miss Fabulous International =

International beauty pageant held in Thailand

- Abbreviation: MFI
- Formation: December 2022
- Type: Beauty pageant
- Headquarters: Chiang Mai, Thailand
- Official language: English
- Parent organization: Bryan Tan World Co., Ltd.

Miss Fabulous International (Thai: มิสแฟบิวลัสอินเตอร์เนชันแนล) is an international beauty pageant open to women and individuals from the LGBTQIA+ community, ages 18 to 40, who are eligible to participate. Its head office and headquarters are located in Chiang Mai, Thailand. The pageant held its inaugural edition in 2022 under the leadership of Bryan Tan, who also serves as the president of the contest.

Miss Fabulous International operates a national platform under the direct supervision of its organization, including Miss Fabulous Thailand and other national Miss Fabulous competitions. The organization grants the rights to the respective country's competition division to manage and oversee the event.

== History ==
Miss Fabulous International is an international beauty pageant founded by Brian Tan, a well-known Thai influencer. The contest was first held in 2022 in Chiang Mai, Thailand.

== Titleholders ==
Year	Edition	Miss Fabulous International	Runner-Ups		Date	Venue	Host Country	Entrants	Ref.
Year	Edition	Miss Fabulous International	First	Second	Date	Venue	Host Country	Entrants	Ref.
2022	1st	Thailand; Chutikan Suwannakhot	Laos; Sophia Sornphet Inthisom	Sweden; Natalia Wannes Phukthong	December 15, 2022	Chiangmai Hall, Central Chiang Mai Airport	Thailand	9	
2023	2nd	Japan; Rika Kinoshita	Thailand; Maeya Sun Sun	Vietnam; Lương Mỹ Kỳ	December 3, 2023	Chao Phraya Grand Hall, Bangkok	Thailand	9	

=== Country/Territory by number of wins ===
Country	Title(s)	Years
Japan	1	2023
Thailand	1	2022

==== Continents by number of wins ====
Continents	Title(s)	Country (Number)
America	0	
Europe	0	
Asia	2	Thailand (1), Japan (1)
Africa	0	
Oceania	0	

== Ranking of countries ==
Country	Winner	1st Runner-Up	2nd Runner-Up	Top 5	Competed	Total
Thailand	1	1	0	0	0	2
Laos	0	1	0	1	0	2
Vietnam	0	0	1	0	1	2
Cambodia	0	0	0	0	2	2
Japan	1	0	0	0	0	1
Sweden	0	0	1	0	0	1
Denmark	0	0	0	1	0	1
Pakistan	0	0	0	1	0	1
Russia	0	0	0	1	0	1
Australia	0	0	0	0	1	1
Indonesia	0	0	0	0	1	1
Myanmar	0	0	0	0	1	1
Serbia	0	0	0	0	1	1
United Kingdom	0	0	0	0	1	1

== See also ==
- Miss Fabulous Myanmar
- Miss Fabulous Thailand
- List of beauty pageants
