= Miss Cosmopolitan World =

Beauty pageant

- Formation: 2015
- Founded at: Kuala Lumpur, Malaysia
- Type: Beauty pageant
- Headquarters: Kuala Lumpur
- Location: Malaysia
- Official language: English
- Current titleholder: Rindsay Rachelle Laige; Malaysia
- Key people: Amelia Liew
- Website: www.misscosmopolitanworld.org

Miss Cosmopolitan World is an international beauty pageant that was established in 2015 and is headquartered in Malaysia, under the leadership of Amelia Liew.

The current titleholder is Rindsay Rachelle Laige from Malaysia. She was crowned on the 9th of November 2023.

== History ==
Amelia Liew owner and President of the organization competed in the 2009 Miss Universe Malaysia contest and participated in a world-level contest, Miss Asia Pageant 2011 in Hong Kong. The first official media launch of MCW 2015 was held in Penang on May 20, 2015.

The contest functions as a platform to promote the local tourism industry, showcasing its culture, cuisine, and attractions to participants from other countries.

== Titleholders ==
This is the complete list of countries and territories that have won the crown.

Year	Miss Cosmopolitan World	Runners-up				Venue	City	Entrants	Ref.
Year	Miss Cosmopolitan World	First	Second	Third	Fourth	Venue	City	Entrants	Ref.
2023	Malaysia; Rindsay Rachelle Laige	Philippines; Valerie Mae Guillermo	Tonga; Lata I Tu’ Atau Naeata	Nepal; Smriti Shrestha	Crimea; Bella Kim	Majestic Hotel Kuala Lumpur	Kuala Lumpur, Malaysia	15	
2020–2022 Cancelled due to the COVID-19 pandemic.
2019	Nepal; Priya Rani Lama	Malaysia; Christine Chai Xin Tze	Netherlands; Marit Beets	Philippines; Clarisa Maye Presa Isidro	Russia; Ekaterina Veinberger	Putrajaya Marriott Hotel	Kuala Lumpur	32	
2018	South Korea; Soyeon Lim	Namibia; Stephanie Silvia Tsuos	Philippines; Zoe Kirsten Zarate Carlyle	Lithuania; Brigita Gaizauskaite	Netherlands; Kimberley Mady IJsbrandij	One World Hotel	Petaling Jaya, Malaysia	29	
2017	Indonesia; Sheryltha Pratyscha	Myanmar; Myat Noe Chit	Trinidad and Tobago; Semoy De Four	United States; Stephanie Ellen	Malaysia; Chenelle Wong	Putrajaya Marriott Hotel	Kuala Lumpur, Malaysia	30	
2016	Russia; Veronika Markova	United States; Kiana Harris	Japan; Maria Kamiyama	Indonesia; Levina Faby	New Zealand; Brooke Craig	Hotel Istana Kuala Lumpur City Centre	Kuala Lumpur, Malaysia	28	
2015	New Zealand; Rachel Adele Harradence	South Korea; Monique Song	Malaysia; Kohinoor Kaur	Croatia; Andrea Ankovic	England; Rebecca Boggiano	Hotel Istana Kuala Lumpur City Centre	Kuala Lumpur, Malaysia	17	

=== Countries/territories by number of wins ===
Country/Territory	Titles	Year(s)
Malaysia	1	2023
Nepal	1	2019
South Korea	1	2018
Indonesia	1	2017
Russia	1	2016
New Zealand	1	2015

== See also ==
- List of beauty pageants
