= QX (magazine) =

Swedish LGBT magazine

- July 2019 cover
- Categories: LGBT magazine
- Frequency: Monthly
- Publisher: QX Förlag AB
- Founded: 1995; 31 years ago
- Country: Sweden
- Based in: Stockholm
- Language: Swedish
- Website: qx.se
- ISSN: 1401-1794

QX is a magazine specializing in topics of interest to the LGBTQ community in Sweden (and, more generally, throughout Scandinavia). It was launched started in 1995. It is published in Swedish monthly by QX Förlag AB and is the largest magazine of its kind in the region.

QX GayMap Stockholm is a printed summer guide in English to the Stockholm gay scene. The printed map has a distribution of 40,000 copies.

== QX Events ==
QX arranges the yearly award-ceremony Gaygalan Awards, handing out prizes for LGBT-achievements since 1999. In 2004, the gala was broadcast for the first time on Sveriges Television when it was held at Hamburger Börs with Annika Lantz as the host. QX also currently rules the franchise of Mr Gay Sweden and has a sponsorship with the Stockholm Pride Agency.

== Online ==
QX ran the Internet community Qruiser, which has over 100,000 users. It was the largest community for LGBT people in Scandinavia. There are versions in Swedish, Danish, Norwegian, Finnish, German and English. The website covered entertainment news, as well as political and cultural events. On the 31 March 2025, Qruiser shut down after being active for 25 years, citing a lack of funds due to an inability to compete with newer social media platforms run by large corporations like Meta.

The magazine continues to publish articles online on its website, and also runs a web shop which sells various items related to the LGBTQ community to local governments, Pride festivals and organisations as well as to private customers. The web shop is available in Swedish, English and Finnish.
