= Mr. Universe =

Mr. Universe may refer to:

== Bodybuilding contests ==
- IFBB Mr. Universe, now the World Amateur Bodybuilding Championships, a male bodybuilding contest organised by the International Federation of BodyBuilding & Fitness (IFBB)
- NABBA Mr. Universe, a Pro/Am competition at the Universe Championships annual bodybuilding event

== Entertainment ==
- Jim Gaffigan: Mr. Universe, 2012 stand-up special by comedian Jim Gaffigan
- Mr. Universe (album), a 1979 album by the British rock band Gillan
- Mister Universe (film), the 1951 film debut of Vince Edwards
- Mister Universo 2016 Austrian-Italian film in which 1957 Mr. Universe Arthur Robin plays himself
- Mr. Universe, a 1988 Hungarian feature film with a cameo by 1955 Mr. Universe Mickey Hargitay playing himself
- Mr. Universe, a character in the 2005 film Serenity
- Mr. Universe, the stage name of Greg Universe from Cartoon Network show Steven Universe
