= Mister Taiwan =

- Type: Male beauty pageant
- Headquarters: Taichung, Taiwan
- Qualifies for: 6: Mister Friendship International; Man of the Year; Mister Tourism World; Mister Universe Tourism; Man of the World; Mister Cosmopolitan
- First edition: 2023
- Most recent edition: 2025
- Current titleholder: Beson Ku
- National Director: Jason Kao
- CEO: Kenta Sung
- Language: Chinese

Mister Taiwan (Chinese: 台灣先生; previously, the pageant was known as Mister Friendship Taiwan since 2023) is an annual national male beauty pageant responsible for selecting Taiwan's representatives to the Mister International, Mister Global, Mister Friendship International, Man of the World and other international competitions. The current Mister Taiwan is Beson Ku.

== International Crowns ==
Number of wins under Mister Taiwan
Franchises
Pageant	Title	Winning year(s)
Man of the Year	1	2025
Mister Universe Tourism	1	2024
Mister Friendship International	1	2024
Mister Cosmopolitan	1	2025

The following are the Mister Taiwan titleholders throughout the years.

- One — Mister Friendship International winner:
  - Henry Chang (2024)
- One — Man of the Year winner:
  - Ven Lee (2025)
- One — Mister Universe Tourism winner:
  - Mint Chen (2024)
- One — Mister Cosmopolitan winner:
  - Shawn Lin (2025)

== Titles ==
Number of wins from Mister Taiwan (past licenses)
Membership	Year
Man of the World	2023 — Present
Mister Friendship International	2023 — Present
Mister Tourism World	2024 — Present
Mister Universe Tourism	2024 — Present
Man Hot Star International	2024 — Present
Man of the Year	2025 — Present
Mister Cosmopolitan	2025 — Present
Mister International	2023 — 2024
Mister Global	2023 — 2024

Note that the year designates the time Mister Taiwan has acquired that particular pageant franchise.

Current

- Man of the World 2023 — Present
- Mister Friendship International 2023 — Present
- Mister Tourism World 2024 — Present
- Mister Universe Tourism 2024 — Present
- Man Hot Star International 2024 — Present
- Man of the Year 2025 — Present
- Mister Cosmopolitan 2025 — Present

Current

- Mister International 2023 — 2024
- Mister Global 2023 — 2024

== Titleholders ==
Edition	Year	Date	Mister Taiwan (Note: Mister Friendship Taiwan since 2023, the name was changed to Mister Taiwan in 2024.)	Runners-Up				Venue	Entrants	Ref.
Edition	Year	Date	Mister Taiwan	First	Second	Third	Fourth	Venue	Entrants	Ref.
1	2023	24 September 2023	朱天宇 Sky Chu	戴啟明 Kevin Tai	陳建宇 Mint Chen	林周皓鈞 Aziman Mai 邱羿浤 Chris Chiu	Not awarded	Lih Pao Fulloon Hotel, Taichung	26	
2	2024	30 June 2024	何國仲 Adam He	張立亭 Henry Chang	吳政霖 Leon Wu	林承鈞 Ace Lin 游文瑋 Angus Yu; ~~劉大澄 Leo Liu~~ (Note: Dethroned.)	陳億燦 Kaye Chen 黃允韜 Tao Huang 賴韋廷 Wayne Lai 林鈺翔 Shawn Lin	Lih Pao Fulloon Hotel, Taichung	43	
3	2025	20 July 2025	古翔原 Beson Ku	唐偉祥 Sean Tang 蘇俊瑜 Stefan Su	謝承志 Evin Xie 李俊龍 Ven Lee 劉淇 Liu Chi	黃傳恩 Ryan Huang 黃鄧霖 Kenny Huang 簡嘉宏 Arthur Jian 陳泓嘉 Josh Chen 姜俊豪 Jiang Jun Hao	Not awarded	Fullon Hotel Taipei Central, Taipei	15	

== Taiwan representatives at international beauty pageants ==
Color keys

- : Declared as winner
- : Ended as runner-up
- : Ended as one of the finalists
- : Ended as one of the semi-finalists
- : Ended as special awards winner

=== Mister Friendship International ===
Year	Representative	Placement at Mister Taiwan	Placement at Mister Friendship International	Special Award(s)	Ref.
2023	朱天宇 Sky Chu	Mister Taiwan 2023	1st Runner-up	1: Best National Costume	
2024	張立亭 Henry Chang	1st Runner-up (2024)	Mister Friendship International	0	
2025	古翔原 Benson Ku	Mister Taiwan 2025	4th Runner-up	0	

=== Mister Global ===
Year	Representative	Placement at Mister Taiwan	Placement at Mister Global	Special Award(s)	Ref.
2023	戴啟明 Kevin Tai	1st Runner-up (2023)	3rd Runner-up		
2024	林承鈞 Ace Lin	3rd Runner-up (2024)	Top 20	1: Top 3 Mister Popular Vote	

=== Mister International ===
Year	Representative	Placement at Mister Taiwan	Placement at Mister International	Special Award(s)	Ref.
2023	陳建宇 Mint Chen	1st Runner-up (2023)	Unplaced	2: Shining Bright by HYA; Most Attractive Men	
2024	何國仲 Adam He	Mister Taiwan 2024	Unplaced		

=== Man of the World ===
Year	Representative	Placement at Mister Taiwan	Placement at Man of the World	Special Award(s)	Ref.
2025	游文瑋 Angus Yu	3rd Runner-up (2024)	Top 18	1: (bronze) Mister Photogenic	
2026	劉淇 Liu Chi	2nd Runner-up (2025)	Top 18	1: (bronze) Best in Formal Wear	

=== Man of the Year ===
Year	Representative	Placement at Mister Taiwan	Placement at Man of the Year	Special Award(s)	Ref.
2023	林周皓鈞 Aziman Mai	3rd Runner-up (2023)	1st Runner-up	1: Masculine	
2024	黃允韜 Tao Huang	4th Runner-up (2024)	Top 8	1: Supermodel	
2025	李俊龍 Ven Lee	2nd Runner-up (2025)	Man of the Year	1: Manly	

=== Mister Tourism World ===
Year	Representative	Placement at Mister Taiwan	Placement at Mister Tourism World	Special Award(s)	Ref.
2024	吳政霖 Leon Wu	2nd Runner-up (2024)	3rd Runner-up	4: 1st Runner-Up Multimedia Award; Best National Costume by Fan Vote; Mister Charming Smile; Mister Tourism People's Choice	

=== Man Hot Star International ===
Year	Representative	Placement at Mister Taiwan	Placement at Man Hot Star International	Special Award(s)	Ref.
2024	陳億燦 Kaye Chen	4th Runner-up (2024)	4th Runner-up		

=== Mister Universe Tourism ===
Year	Representative	Placement at Mister Taiwan	Placement at Mister Universe Tourism	Special Award(s)	Ref.
2024	陳建宇 Mint Chen	2nd Runner-up (2023)	Mister Universe Tourism	1: Best in Swim Wear	

=== Mister Cosmopolitan ===
Year	Representative	Placement at Mister Taiwan	Placement at Mister Cosmopolitan	Special Award(s)	Ref.
2025	林鈺翔 Shawn Lin	4th Runner-up (2024)	Mister Cosmopolitan	1: People Choice Award	
