= Miss Wallis and Futuna =

French beauty pageant

- Type: Beauty pageant
- Headquarters: Wallis and Futuna, France
- Members: Miss France
- Official language: French
- Regional director: Alain Ruotolo

Miss Wallis and Futuna (French: Miss Wallis-et-Futuna) is a French beauty pageant which selects a representative for the Miss France national competition from the overseas collectivity of Wallis and Futuna. The first Miss Wallis and Futuna was crowned in 2000, although the competition is not organized on a regular schedule. It was not run for a decade after 2004, and a new titleholder has not been crowned since 2020.

The most recent Miss Wallis and Futuna is Mylène Halemai, who was crowned Miss Wallis and Futuna 2020 on 26 September 2020. No Miss Wallis and Futuna titleholders have gone on to win Miss France.

== Results summary ==
No Miss Wallis and Futuna titleholders have reached the semifinals of Miss France.

== Gallery ==
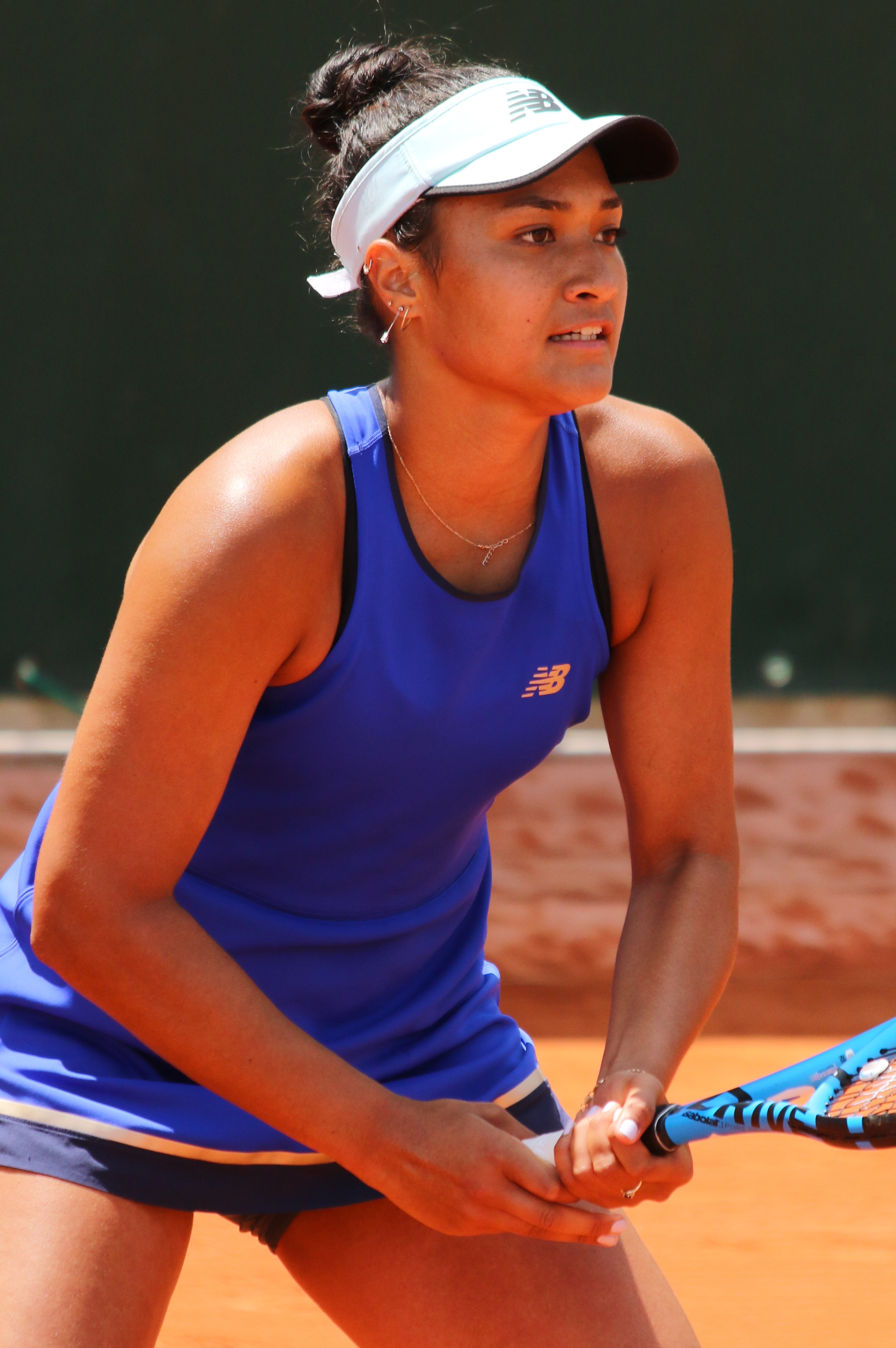
Miss Wallis and Futuna 2020
Mylène Halemai

== Titleholders ==
Year	Name	Age (Note: Ages at the time of Miss France)	Height	Hometown	Miss France placement	Notes
2020	Mylène Halemai	19	1.73 m (5 ft 8 in)	Fineveke		
2019	Violène Blondel	18	1.70 m (5 ft 7 in)	Falaleu	Did not compete	
2004	Monika Fiafialoto	20	1.70 m (5 ft 7 in)			
2003	Léonella Tuulaki		1.75 m (5 ft 9 in)			
2002	Caroline Brial		1.76 m (5 ft 9 1/2 in)			
2000	Sabrina Javelier			Hahake		
