= Ms. Texas Senior America =

Ms Texas Senior America is an annual competition open to senior citizens, with minimum required age of 60 years or above. The participants write stories of their life and showcase their talent to five judges.

== Winners ==
- Vivian Kleinwacher (1991)
- Gaynelle Carley Gray (1992)
- Mary Frances Hansen (1997)
- Mary Virginia Tuinstra (2002)
- Beth Weems Pirtle (2003)
- Wanda Madge Jones (2004)
- Fan Benno-Caris (2005)
- Pat Madden Housel (2006)
- Mary Edwards Zumwalt (2007)
- Syntha West (2008)
- Sarah Senter (2009)
- Paula Lee (2010)
- Debbie Carroll-Boyce (2011)
- Lillie Madison (2012)
- Myrna Blackwood (2013)
- Sheila Klein (2014)
- Jill Beam (2015)
- Sandy McCravy (2016)
- Catherine Brown (2017)
- Sherry Dodson (2018)
- Joyce Brown (2019)
- Kimberly Ghedi (2022)
