= Miss Viet Nam Continents =

- Logo of the MVNC organization
- Formation: 2011
- Type: Beauty Pageant
- Headquarters: California
- Location: United States
- Official language: Vietnamese, English
- President: Minh Chanh
- Website: missvnc.com

The Miss Viet Nam Continents (Vietnamese: Hoa hậu phu nhân người Việt thế giới) is a beauty pageant for women from Vietnam or of Vietnamese descent that is held annually in the United States. MVNC, the organizer, also hosts a Mrs. Viet Nam Continents, and a Mr. Viet Nam Continents pageant.

== Competition rounds ==
Prior to the final telecast the delegates compete in the preliminary competition, which involves private interviews with the judges and showcasing their evening gown and swimsuits for the judges for scoring. During the final competition, the semi-finalists are announced and go on to compete in swimsuit and evening gown and questions and answers.

== History ==
The first edition of Miss Viet Nam Continents pageant was held August 13, 2011 in Long Beach, California. The pageant is a combine entertainment and pageant show. Each year there are a number of line up performances for the night.

=== Editions ===
Year	Edition	Date	Venue	Host country	Entrants
2011	1st Annual	August 13	Carpenter Performing Arts Center, Long Beach, California	United States	35
2012	2nd Annual	July 7	PH Live, Planet Hollywood Resort and Casino, Paradise, Nevada	United States	29
2012-2013	1st Annual	December 15	Carpenter Performing Arts Center, Long Beach, California	United States	15
2013	3rd Annual	August 10	Carpenter Performing Arts Center, Long Beach, California	United States	18
2014	2nd Annual	January 3	La Mirada Theatre, La Mirada, California	United States	14
2014	4th Annual	August 9	Carpenter Performing Arts Center, Long Beach, California	United States	22
Miss and Mr Vietnam Continents 2015	5th Annual	August 1	Rose Centre Theatre, Westminster, California	United States	16
Mrs Vietnam Continents 2015	4th Annual	December 26	The Venetian Las Vegas, Las Vegas, Nevada	United States	19

== Titleholders ==
Year	Country/Territory	MVNC	Winner title	Location
2018/2019	California	Angelina Phuong Pham	Ms. Viet Nam Continents	Garden Grove, California, United States
2015/2016	California	Phan Yen Phuong	Mrs Viet Nam Continents	Las Vegas, Nevada, United States
2015	California	Jennifer Tien Huynh	Mrs Viet Nam Continents	California, United States
2015	California	Kevin Nguyen	Mr Viet Nam Continents	California, United States
2015	Washington	Brandy Ngo	Miss Viet Nam Continents	California, United States
2014	Missouri	Tung Ngo	Mr Viet Nam Continents	California, United States
2014	Vietnam	Le Tuong Vy	Miss Viet Nam Continents	California, United States
2014	Vietnam	Bu Thi Ha	Mrs Viet Nam Continents	California, United States
2013	California	Myna Le	Miss Viet Nam Continents	California, United States
2012-2013	Vietnam	Nguyen Thu Hoai	Mrs Viet Nam Continents	California, United States
2012	California	Julia Ho	Miss Viet Nam Continents	Las Vegas, Nevada, United States
2012	Germany	Pham Tuan Anh	Mr Viet Nam Continents	Las Vegas, Nevada, United States
2011	Vietnam	Ngoc Trinh	Miss Viet Nam Continents	California, United States
