= Alee Club =

Oldest Pageant

- Alee Club Miss & Mr Teen India
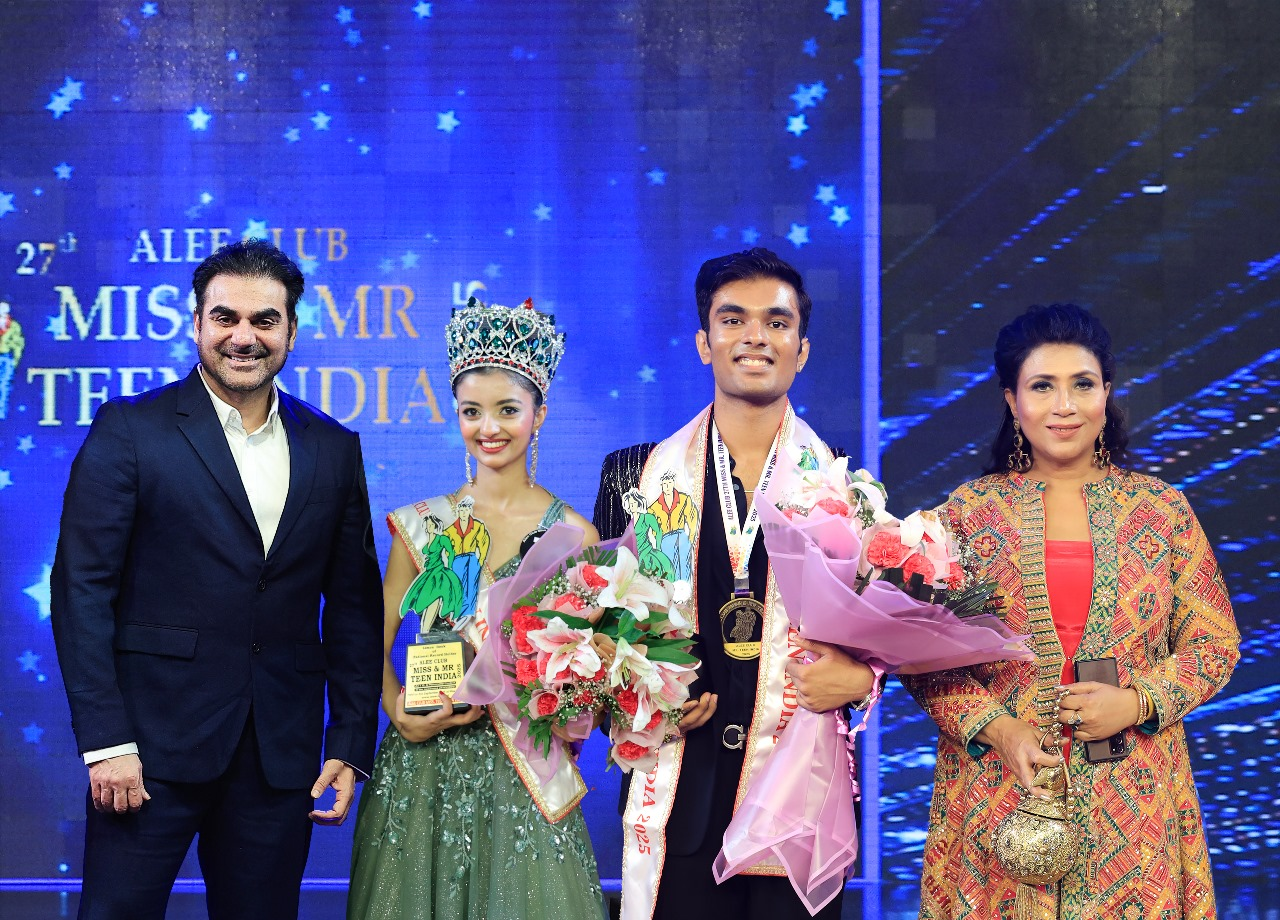
- 2025 winners with Arbaaz Khan and Rampguru Sambita Bose
- Formation: 1997
- Purpose: to nurture and promote young talent, empower teenagers, and create a pathway into the glamour and entertainment industries.
- Headquarters: New Delhi
- Location: India
- Official language: Hindi and English
- Director: Sambita Bose
- President: M M Mehta
- Website: https://www.aleeclub.net insta page :- https://www.instagram.com/teenindia/?hl=en

Miss & Mr Teen India also called Alee Club Miss & Mr Teen India is the oldest pageant with holding Limca Book of Records for teenagers in India, which was started in the year 1997, that is the platform to the young boys and girls between 13 and 19 years of age to showcase their talent in front of the world.

The first pageant was organized on 10 August 1997 at the Talkatora Stadium, New Delhi. The first winners of the pageant were Rushali crowned as Alee Club Miss Teen India 1997 and Umesh crowned as Alee Club Mr. Teen India 1997. The Reigning Alee Club 27th Miss Teen India is Misty Gadhwal and Alee Club 27th Mr Teen India is Raghav Sarraf.

== Winners ==
Award Year	Miss Teen India	Mr. Teen India
1997	Rushali	Umesh
1998	Sanana	Ashish
1999	Natasha Aggarwal	Gaurav
2000	Antra Bhatt	Siddharth
2001	Anisha Kapoor	Suminder Oberoi
2002	Priyanka Soni	Kartik Uppal
2003	Ashima Sethi	Aditya Chawala
2004	Abhishek Jain	Ridhima Jain
2005	Rohit Raghav	Khyati Pal
2006	Shweta Saroha	Sopan Sethi
2007	Sonam	Atul
2008	Akrita Saim	Nikhil Malhotra
2009	Satkaran Bajwa	Himani Singh
2010	Pratyaksha Arora	Raghu Bhatiya
2011	Simran Kaur	Kshitij Puniya
2012	Aman Gupta	Shaleen Bhasin
2013	Neha Gupta	Mayank Kumar
2014	Akanksha Sharma	Vishal Rathi
2015	Scully Dsouza	Prakhar Khandelwal
2016	Snighda Seth	Ansh Handa
2017	Khushboo Bhatia	Umang Mahajan
2018	Milan Kumari Panda	Rajnish Singh
2019	Dia Singh	Harsh Madhani
2020	No event due to Covid-19	No event due to Covid-19
2021	Anoushka Chouhan	Divyansh Sonwal
2022	Rifkah Das Gupta	Dheeren Pathania
2023	Maahee Sood	Aarab Sharma
2024	Fiona Wilfy Vas	Anshul Rawat
2025	Mishty Gadhwal	Raghav Sarraf
