= Miss Holocaust Survivor =

Israeli beauty pageant

- Type: Beauty pageant
- Location: Israel
- Key people: Shimon Sabag
- Affiliations: International Christian Embassy; Yad Ezer L’Haver

Miss Holocaust Survivor was a beauty pageant in Israel for elderly women who survived the Holocaust. It was organized by International Christian Embassy and Yad Ezer L’Haver. The event, held for the first time in Haifa, Israel, sparked controversy.

== History ==
In 2012, the International Christian Embassy and Yad Ezer L’Haver (English: Helping Hand) joined to create the Miss Holocaust Survivor pageant, organized by Shimon Sabag. The event, which was touted as a "celebration of life", immediately drew criticism. Sabag responded that the participants "feel good together. They are having a good time and laughing in the rehearsals. The fact that so many wanted to participate proves that it's a good idea." Almost 300 participants applied to be in the competition, which was eventually whittled down to 14. The age range of the participants ranged from 74 to 97. The event was held on June 28, 2012, and attended by approximately 600 people, among them politicians Moshe Kahlon and Yossi Peled. A four-person panel of judges judged the event.

In 2013, the pageant was held at the Romema Sport Arena in Haifa, Israel. The event was attended by approximately 2,500 people. Pageant judges included Pnina Rosenblum and media personality Judy Shalom Nir-Mozes. 18 women participated in the pageant, aged 70 to 94.

In 2015, 13 women participated in the pageant, which was held on November 24, 2015. Participants told the stories of their survival to the audience. One of the judges that year was journalist Lihi Lapid, wife of Israeli politician Yair Lapid, who stated, "I think we chose them by their will for life, by their energy. They were so happy to be there on stage and to tell their story. Each one of them wanted and mentioned the fact that she is here because she wants us to remember and to talk about it and to never forget. And there was something so touching by the way they just wanted us to understand that we need to celebrate life."

In 2016, out of 300 women who applied for the competition, applicants were whittled down to 14 finalists. A choir made up entirely of Holocaust survivors made its debut at the event, which was attended by almost 1,000 people. Among the attendees were Yona Yahav and Sara Netanyahu, among other Israeli dignitaries. The winner, Anna Grinis, was crowned to the song "Pretty Woman."

In 2018, the 93-year-old great-grandmother, Tova Ringer who was born in Poland and survived the Auschwitz concentration camp during World War II was chosen out of 12 finalists.

== Titleholders ==
| Year | Miss Holocaust Survivor | Age at time of competition | Birth Country | Source |
|---|---|---|---|---|
| 2018 | Tova Ringer | 93 | Poland | |
| 2016 | Anna Grinis | 75 | Russia | |
| 2015 | Rita Berkowitz | 83 | Romania | |
| 2013 | Shoshana Kolmer | 94 | Czech Republic | |
| 2012 | Hava Hershkovitz | 78 | Romania | |

== Criticism ==
Colette Avital, an Israeli politician, stated, "It sounds totally macabre to me. I am in favor of enriching lives, but a one-time pageant masquerading (survivors) with beautiful clothes is not what is going to make their lives more meaningful."

Gal Mor, an editor of Holes in the Net, stated, "Why should a decayed, competitive institution that emphasizes women's appearance be used as inspiration, instead of allowing them to tell their story without gimmicks? This is one step short of 'Survivor-Holocaust' or 'Big Brother Auschwitz.' It leaves a bad taste. Holocaust survivors should be above all this."
