= Senior Pageants Group =

American glamour lifestyle company

- #Embrace, Encourage, Empower
- Founded: 2015
- Headquarters: New York City
- Location: United States
- Products: Non-Profit Senior Pageants
- Official language: English
- Key people: Marianne Hamilton, Pageant Executive Director
- Website: seniorpageantsgroup.com

Senior Pageants Group is a glamour lifestyle company that manages and promotes various beauty pageants for women aged 50 to 90+ in the United States. The organization is headquartered in New York, New York. As of 2022, the pageants are broken down to six categories; Ms. Senior United States is a contest open to women aged For ages 50–59, Ms. Senior USA open to women ages 60–74, Ms. Super Senior USA open to women ages 75–89, and Grande Dame Universe for women aged 90+.

The organization also has active pageants for Ms. Senior Universe for those aged 55–74 with a country of origin and another national pageant title, and Ms. Super Senior Universe for those aged 75+ and Ms. Senior Universe standard.

The Senior Pageants are not affiliated with the much younger-aged Miss USA and Miss Universe organizations.

== Latest pageants ==
The 2023 finals for the Ms. Senior Universe, Ms. Super Senior Universe, and Ms. Grande Dame Universe pageants were held in Orlando, Florida. The 2024 finals were held in Las Vegas, Nevada, with the winners attending the Super Bowl LVIII.

== Awards ==
- Ms. Senior United States (Ages 50–59)
- Ms. Senior USA (Ages 60–74)
- Ms. Super Senior USA (Ages 75–89)
- Ms. Senior Universe (Ages 60–74)
- Ms. Super Senior Universe (Ages 75–89)
- Ms. Grand Dame Universe (Age 90+)

The various categories focus on the competitors’ ability to show their accomplishments and how the contestants portray themselves. There is no bathing suit competition, only an evening gown segment. During the pageants, candidates are judged on integrity, talent, philosophy of life, poise in formal wear, and answering interview questions.

== Winners ==
Data reported for 2016–2022, by Pageantry Magazine
| Award | Ms. Senior Sweetheart (50+) | Ms. Senior United States (50–59) | Ms. Senior USA (60+) | Ms. Senior United Nations Ambassador (60+) | Ms. Senior Universe (60+) | Ms. Super Senior USA (75+) | Ms. Super Senior Universe (75+) | Ms. Grand Dame Universe (90+) |
|---|---|---|---|---|---|---|---|---|
| 2024–25 | | | | Christine Campbell | Debbie Nelson | | Nancy Berhorst | Sonya Ross |
| 2022–23 | Christine Campbell Shelley Gish, 1st runner up to complete year | Karryn Russo | Debbie Nelson Janene Burton, 1st runner up to complete year | Becky Wu | Jian Sakakeeny | Elin Jones | JoAnn Bechtel | Bonnie Luebke |
| 2021–22 | Nancy Berhorst | Diane Moore-Eubanks | Gailyn Saahir | Gailyn Saahir | Marianne Hamilton | Faye Melton | Barbara Reincke | Ida White |
| 2020–21 | Gailyn Saahir | Crystal Stout | Philly Arnold | Cherie Kidd | Marianne Hamilton | Barbara Reincke | Barbara Reincke | Klyda Mahoney |
| 2019–20 | Peggy Fowler | Liz Palmer (resigned title) Nicole Duffel | Cheri Kidd | Debbie Miller | Nicole Duffel | Joanie Helgesen | Joanie Helgesen | Marilyn Kohler |
| 2018–19 | June Lacey | Lauren Monahan | Sara Jo Burks | Elizabeth Purtee | Sherry Strothe | Nancy Long | Sally Beth Vick | Marilyn O’Connell |
| 2017–18 | Not awarded | Not Awarded | Donna McGuffie Debbie Miller | Not awarded | Donna McGuffie | Honorary; Elizabeth Garrison | Betty Aden | Marilyn O’Connell |
| 2016–17 | Not awarded | Not awarded | Carol Thomas | Not awarded | Kat Ray | Not awarded | Not awarded | Not awarded |
| 2015–16 | Not awarded | Not awarded | Kat Ray | Not awarded | Not awarded | Not awarded | Not awarded | Not awarded |
