= Miss Liechtenstein =

Miss Liechtenstein is a title awarded by beauty pageants for unmarried women in Liechtenstein. The first pageant was held in 1988. The second was held in 1994. Events in 2007 and 2008 were organized by a local organizing committee, Verein Miss Liechtenstein. In 2007, nine finalists were selected from among applications to compete in the pageant. The following year, eight finalists were selected.

In October 2009, the then-reigning Miss Liechtenstein, Stefanie Kaiser, gave birth to a baby girl.

== Titleholders ==
Year	Name
1988	Verena Berthold
1989–1993	not held
1994	Carmen Foser-Königsdorfer
1995–2006	not held
2007	Fabienne Walser
2008	Stefanie Kaiser

The magazine Miss Europe Continental has articles introducing person with the title 'Miss Liechtenstein': Jasmin Falk. It is unclear whether these individual is official winner of the relevant contest.

== Liechtenstein at International pageants ==
=== Miss Intercontinental Liechtenstein ===
- : Declared as Winner
- : Ended as runner-up or top 5/6 qualification
- : Ended as one of the finalists or semifinalists
- : Ended as special awards winner

Year	Miss Liechtenstein	Placement at Miss Intercontinental	Special Awards	Notes
Did not compete since 2005—present
2004	Sybille Grossenbacher	Unplaced		
