= Miss Teen Africa =

Teen beauty pageant

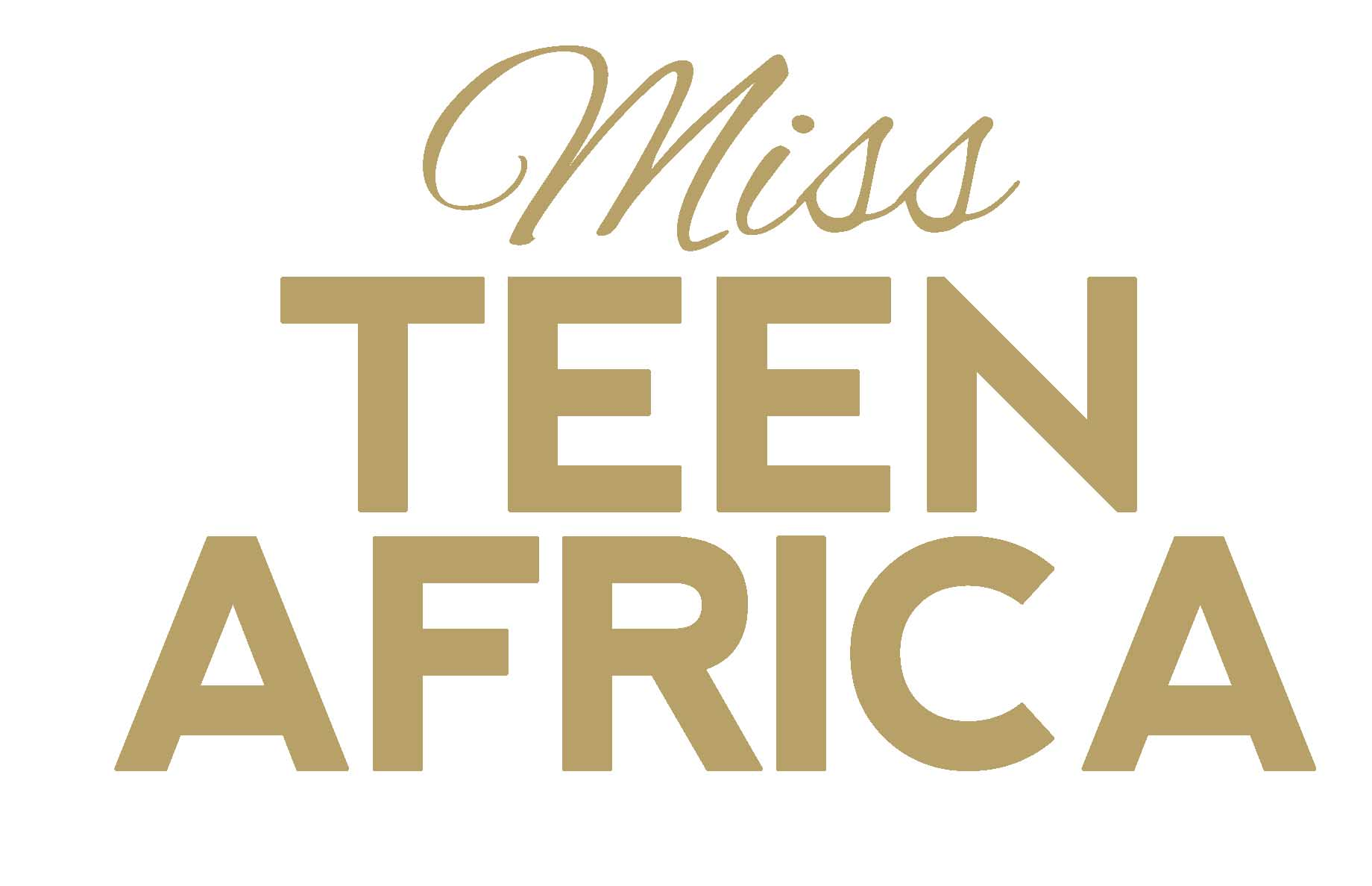
- Formation: 26 May 2014; 12 years ago
- Founder: Yomi Adegoke
- Purpose: Beauty pageant
- Headquarters: London
- Location: United Kingdom
- Official language: English
- Website: www.missteenafrica.com

Miss Teen Africa is an annual international beauty and cultural pageant for young women aged 14 to 19 of African origin. Established in the United Kingdom, the pageant was created to provide a platform for African teenagers in the diaspora to celebrate and promote African culture, identity, and youth empowerment. It is regarded as one of the first pageant platforms of its kind dedicated specifically to African teens in the UK diaspora.

In 2018, the organisation entered a two year developmental hiatus to establish an international franchise structure. This expansion model enabled participating countries outside the United Kingdom to organise national competitions and select official delegates. By 2020, the Miss Teen Africa franchise had expanded to more than 15 African countries, including Botswana, Zambia, and South Africa.

In the 2025 edition, the pageant introduced the PreTeen Africa category for the first time, broadening its platform to include younger participants. Moso Ditirwa of Botswana became the inaugural PreTeen Africa titleholder. The same year, Leyla Shongwe won Miss Teen Africa 2025 in South Africa.

== History ==
Miss Teen Africa (MTA) was founded in 2014 in the UK by Yomi Adegoke as a result of the need to promote African culture in the diaspora and to seek opportunities for young women of African Heritage worldwide.

In 2015, the inaugural edition was won by Monique Narh, who represented Ghana with other 15 delegates from around the UK.

In 2016, Sangwani Harawa won the title from Malawi. In 2017 Amirah Akpan became the first Nigerian winner.

In 2018, the pageant was not held due to increased demands from contestants and stakeholders all over Africa. In 2019 the organisation announced the launch of its first-ever franchise that will give more countries the opportunity to send their representative to compete at the grand finale. In 2020 the pageant was postponed due to the ongoing COVID-19 pandemic.

== Franchise ==
In 2020 the first Miss Teen Africa Zambia was held in Lusaka under the Miss Teen Africa franchise. Mwaka Halwindii was selected to represent Zambia. The Miss Teen Africa franchise is established in over 15 countries including Uganda, Nigeria, Namibia, Botswana and Zambia

== Competition ==
The competition consists of introduction round, national costume, sport wear, question answer round, and evening gown.

== Miss Teen Africa Foundation ==
The Miss Teen Africa Foundation was established in 2017 as a non-profit organisation which serves as the charity arm of the Miss Teen Africa pageant.

== Title holders ==
Edition.	Year	Date	Winner	Country	Venue
1st	2015	7 November	Monique Narh	Ghana	Stratford Town Hall Stratford, London, UK
2nd	2016	10 December	Sangwani Harawa	Malawi	Newham Town Hall East Ham, London, UK
3rd	2017	25 November	Amirah Akpan	Nigeria	Stratford Town Hall Stratford, London, UK
2018 - 2022		Postponed to 2023			
4th	2023	11 September	Anca Smith	Namibia	TBA
5th	2025	14 December	Leyla Shongwe	South Africa	TBA

National Title
Year	Country	Name	Title
2020	Zambia	Mwaka Halwiindi	Miss Teen Africa Zambia
2021	Botswana	Lefika Tladi	Miss Teen Africa Botswana
2021	Namibia	Kaino Jona	Miss Teen Africa Namibia
