= Miss Fabulous Thailand =

Women and LGBTQIA+ pageant contest

- Abbreviation: MFT
- Formation: December, 2021
- Type: Beauty pageant
- Headquarters: Chiang Mai, Thailand
- Key people: Bryan Tan
- Parent organization: Bryan Tan World Co., Ltd.

Miss Fabulous Thailand or Miss Fa Boonlert, is the Thai edition of Miss Fabulous International, a televised beauty pageant for women and LGBTQIA+ individuals between the ages of 18 and 80. Its head office is located in Chiang Mai, Thailand. It was held for the first time in 2022 and was under the leadership of Brian Tan.

== History ==
Miss Fabulous Thailand It is a beauty pageant at the level of Thailand by Mr. Brian Tan, model, singer, actor, influencer. Thailand's YouTube number President of the contest to find people who are beautiful in their own way and have confidence Shape and proportions are not taken into account. The person who receives the title of Miss Fabulous Thailand will receive a cash prize of 300,000 baht, a crown of honor Miss Fabulous Thailand worth 1,000,000 baht for 1 year and sign a contract as a personnel in Brian Tan World Company Limited for 1 year.

== Pageant ==
The competition involves collecting points through doing campaigns or challenges (60% of score) and receiving votes from home viewers (40% of score).

In 2022, these two categories each respectively contributed to 50% of competitors' total scores.

In 2023, the competition involves collecting points through doing campaigns or challenges (50% of score), receiving votes from home viewers via Mr. Fox (30% of score), sale from TikTok shop (10% of score) and special secret score that will be announce before the final competition (10% of score)

=== Selection ===
In 2022, the ten contestants were selected by audition.

In 2023 and for future years, three contestants are chosen from each region of Thailand by a Regional Director, with twelve total contestants participating. The Regional Directors are as follows:

Regional	2023	2024
Northern	Sprite Bababi (Patcheerat Laemluang)	All Souls International
North Eastern	Kana Warrior (Khanasak Nakrob)	
Center	Bannang-ngamkeemao (Miss Keemao)	
Southern	Sivalai Rahothan	

In Season 3 (2024), there are 16 contestants open for applications, which come from the regional contest, 3 from each region and from the Wild Card 4 from the top 4 with the highest number of votes from the Mini Campaign every week, along with the contest at the regional level. All 4 contestants will have the right to choose which sector they will be in Miss Fabulous Thailand.

=== Competition ===
Contestants in the program will be able to complete the Challenge and Campaign of the program prepared.

The winner of each Challenge will receive special privileges including Choosing a set or order in a campaign or earning the highest collection points.

Making a campaign will be the collected points for each competitor. By collecting points, it will be a Ranking score. Those who do the best will receive the highest score. The next best performer gets one point each, and no one gets the same score. The bottom two or the two lowest performers will be voted by the Regional Directors. who will get 2 points and who will get 1 point (in 2022, the contestants will vote for themselves).

=== Final Competition ===
The section of the competition involves collecting points in four rounds:

- Speech Competition
- Swimsuit Competition
- Evening Gown Competition
- Q&A Competition

The contestant who accumulates the most points over the past rounds and the most votes from home is then crowned Miss Fabulous Thailand. The winner will then represent Thailand in Miss Fabulous International.

== Titleholders ==
Northern Central North Eastern Southern

List of Miss Fabulous Thailand Titleholders
Year	Season	Titleholder	Runners Up		Venue	Entrants
Year	Season	Titleholder	First	Second	Venue	Entrants
2022	1st	Chutikarn Suwannakhot (Bangkok)	Ratchanakon Sukchan (Samut Prakan)	Weerinpimon Khamkansingh (Lamphun)	Chiang Mai, Thailand	10
2023	2nd	Koson Seangciware (Nakhon Si Thammarat)	Karina Mueller (Chiang Rai)	Anastasia Ogoye (Bangkok)	Chiang Mai, Thailand	12
2024	3rd	Nok Yallada (Nan)	Aissaree Tharakoolphipat (Nakhon Sawan)	Chayatat Sangpong (Nakhon Pathom)	Bangkok, Thailand	16

List of Young & Fabulous Thailand Titleholders
Year	Season	Category	Titleholder	Runners Up	Venue	Entrants
Year	Season	Category	Titleholder	First	Venue	Entrants
2024	1st	Junior	Serena Moser (Rangsit)	Yanin Palakawong (Thap Thiang)	Bangkok, Thailand	19
2024	1st	Teenager	Martanita thienpradit (Arun Amarin)	Janna Sklam (Bang Lamung)	Bangkok, Thailand	24
2025	2nd	Junior	TBA	TBA	Bangkok, Thailand	TBA
2025	2nd	Teenager	TBA	TBA	Bangkok, Thailand	TBA
2025	2nd	Boy	TBA	TBA	Bangkok, Thailand	TBA

List of Miss & Junior Miss Fah Boonlert Titleholders
Year	Season	Category	Titleholder	Runners Up		Venue	Entrants
Year	Season	Category	Titleholder	First	Second	Venue	Entrants
2024 (B.E. 2567)	1st	Junior Miss	Kanisnicha Krachangrat (Chiang Mai)	Ploypatcha Boonnithiphan (Chiang Mai)	Emily Kamela (Chiang Mai)	Chiang Mai, Thailand	3
2024 (B.E. 2567)	1st	Miss	Chatcharisa Patcharatrichat (Chiang Mai)	Anucharee Thitiratphureepattananon (Chiang Mai)	Phonlach Buakhao (Bangkok)	Chiang Mai, Thailand	9
