= Lucia Bride of Sweden =

Competition in Sweden

National Lucia Bride of Sweden (in Swedish: Sveriges Lucia) was a competition for Swedish females. The winner of the competition would be the "Lucia Bride" heading traditional Lucia processions on December 13, Saint Lucy's Day. The contest was usually held in churches or at the open-air museum Skansen in Stockholm. It was held between 1973 and 2012, and it was sponsored by the publications Året Runt and Stockholm City. Between 2001 and 2007, the competition was called either "Årets Lucia" (Lucia of the year) or "Stockholms Lucia" (Lucia of Stockholm).

Prior to 2008 the event was mainly a beauty contest, but from that year the sponsors wished to judge the contestants primarily by their responses during an interview with the competition's judges, and on their singing ability. Every contestant represented a Swedish charity organization.

Winners include Yvonne Ryding, titleholder of the 1983 contest, who became Miss Sweden and Miss Universe the following year.

== Winners ==
Year	Lucia Bride	Presenter
1973	May Gret Andersson	Princess Christina
1974	Anne Olofsdotter	Nils Erik Baehrendtz
1975	Birgitta Lindvall	Liv Ullmann
1976	Liselotte Cargain	Saul Bellow
1977	Maria Sandahl	Bertil Ohlin
1978	Elisabeth Bernhoff	Ola Ullsten
1979	Gunilla Nilsson	Britt Mogård
1980	Monica Rydell	Jan-Erik Wikström
1981	Laura Wessberg	Kai Siegbahn
1982	Carina Vogestedt	Kai Siegbahn
1983	Yvonne Ryding	William Golding
1984	Cecilia Gullin	Ingemund Bengtsson
1985	Cecilia Ericsson	Sten Andersson
1986	Martina Jansson	Anders Wijkman
1987	Annelie Ericsson	Astrid Lindgren
1988	Sophie Andersson	Cyndee Peters
1989	Anna Kohlström	Alice Babs
1990	Anna Jansson	Princess Christina
1991	Monica Andreasson	Eva Nordenson
1992	Linda Olofsson	Derek Walcott
1993	Victoria Reichel	Ulf Adelsohn
1994	Lisa Almgren	Hans Alfredson
1995	Camilla Johansson	Börje Ahlstedt
1996	Therése Nilsson	Marita Ulvskog
1997	Linda Harritz	Ulf Adelsohn
1998	Jenny Åkerström	Peter Harrysson
1999	Linda Pettersson	Herman Lindqvist
2000	Amanda Gustafsson	Anna Maria Bildt
2001	Linda Cahling	Thomas Di Leva
2002	Emma Johannesson	Bibi Andersson
2003	Therése Andersson	Lars Berghagen
2004	Karin Westerberg	Leif Pagrotsky
2005	Isolde Palombo	Michael Nyqvist
2006	Jennie Samuelsson	Ernst Billgren
2007	Madeleine Gustafsson	Paolo Roberto
2008	Emma Johansson	Paolo Roberto
