= Miss Rodeo America =

Beauty pageant

Miss Rodeo America is an annual pageant to select the official spokesperson for the Professional Rodeo Cowboys Association.

== Current Miss Rodeo America 2026 ==
The Miss Rodeo America 2026 Pageant was held from November 29th to December 7th, 2025, at the South Point Hotel and Casino in Las Vegas. At the pageant, Olivia Favero was crowned Miss Rodeo America. Olivia previously served as the 2025 Miss Rodeo Utah. She is the seventh woman from her state to win the title.

== History ==
The Miss Rodeo America pageant is held in December of every year in conjunction with the National Finals Rodeo (NFR). The competition takes place in Las Vegas, Nevada. Reigning state rodeo queens from across America are eligible to compete for the title and are judged on their appearance, horsemanship, and personality. The winner receives over $20,000 in prizes, including a crown that fits on her cowboy hat, scholarships, Montana Silversmiths jewelry and belt buckles, Justin Boots and Wrangler apparel. She reigns for one year and is expected to travel more than 120,000 miles during her reign. She also makes public appearances at schools and other venues to promote rodeo. Miss Rodeo America was inaugurated in 1956, and the first winner was Marilyn Scott Freimark, who later became a rancher. Olivia Favero of Utah is the 2026 Miss Rodeo America.

== Winners ==
This is a list of women who have won the Miss Rodeo America crown.

Miss Rodeo America
Name	State	Year	Ref
Olivia Favero	Utah	2026	
Callie Mueller	South Dakota	2025	
Emma Cameron	New Mexico	2024	
Kennadee Riggs	Arizona	2023	
Hailey Fredriksen	Colorado	2022	
Jordan Tierney	South Dakota	2020-2021	
Taylor McNair	Mississippi	2019	
Keri (Sheffield) Smith	Florida	2018	
Lisa (Lageshaar) Lucia	Texas	2017	
Katherine Merck	Washington	2016	
Lauren Heaton	Oklahoma	2015	
Paige (Nicholson) Bergeron	Mississippi	2014	
Chenae (Shiner) Vest	Utah	2013	
Mackenzie (Carr) Ivie	Oregon	2012	
McKenzie Haley	South Dakota	2011	
Kelli (Jackson) Russell	Mississippi	2010	
Maegan (Ridley) Hollander	California	2009	
Amy Wilson	Kansas	2008	
Ashley (Andrews) Alderson	North Dakota	2007	
Amanda (Jenkins) Legge	Arizona	2006	
Selena (Ulch) Pope	Nevada	2005	
Darci Robertson	California	2004	
Lori (Bortner) Harding	Nebraska	2003	
Kara (Brown) Gillit	Texas	2002	
Tara (Graham) Rowe	Colorado	2001	
Brandy (DeJongh) Whitlow	California	2000	
Shelly (Williams) Wilcox	Idaho	1999	
Mary (Shaw) Drake	Utah	1998	
MiQuel (Holyoak) McRae	Arizona	1997	
Tanya (McKinnon) Bartlett	Utah	1996	
Jennifer (Douglas) Smith	Texas	1995	
Michele (Green) Mackey	Wyoming	1994	
Sheri (Hannigan) Kloop	California	1993	
Stacey (Talbott) Sinclair	Wyoming	1992	
Lisa (Poese) Jamison	Nebraska	1991	
Joni (James) Smith	Idaho	1990	
Chrissy (Sparling) Allen	California	1989	
Kellie (Dilka) Lambert	Colorado	1988	
Suzy (Gillard) Trahan	Louisiana	1987	
Vicki (Vest) Woodard	Utah	1986	
Leslie (Patten) White	South Dakota	1985	
Sandy (Meyer) Brazile	Wyoming	1984	
Brenda Lee (Bonogofsky) Pickett	North Dakota	1983	
Donna Keffeler	South Dakota	1982	
Kathy (Martin) Colletti	Colorado	1981	
Diana (Putnam) Friend	Kansas	1980	
Debbie (Johnston) Garrison	Texas	1979	
Almabeth (Carroll) Kaess	Colorado	1978	
Terry Ann (Edington) Dukes	Texas	1977	
Betty (Schnell) Freeman	Idaho	1976	
Connie (Della Lucia) Robinson	Utah	1975	
Donna (Howsley) Bullard	Texas	1974	
Pam (Martin) Minick	Nevada	1973	
Susan (Merrill) Agicola	Utah	1972	
Lana (Brackenbury) Parker	Idaho	1971	
Christine (Vincent) Williams	California	1970	
Patricia Eaves	New Mexico	1969	
Sherrie (Vincent) Scott	Arizona	1968	
Nancy Ann (Simmons) Brannon	Nebraska	1967	
Carolynn (Seay) Vietor	Texas	1966	
Pat (Koren) Sanmartin	South Dakota	1965	
Sandi (Prati) Cardwell	Texas	1964	
Joyce (Shelley) Loomis-Kernek	New Mexico	1963	
Karen (Lavens) James	Idaho	1962	
Marie (Mass) Gatlin	Colorado	1961	
Martha (Lehman) Robertson	Arizona	1960	
Susan (Cox) Stauffer	Idaho	1959	
Jan (Porath) Thompson	Michigan	1958	
Dallas (Hunt) George	Nebraska	1957	
Marilyn (Scott) Freimark	Wyoming	1956	

== Miss Rodeo America Scholarship Foundation ==
The Miss Rodeo America program provides one of the most visible media spokespersons for the sport of professional rodeo and the Western way of life. Since its inception in 1955, the Miss Rodeo America Pageant has recognized the need for scholarships to help contestants further their education. The Miss Rodeo America Scholarship Foundation was established in 1997 to broaden the scope of the scholarship program. The winner of Miss Rodeo America receives a $20,000 Educational Scholarship from the Miss Rodeo America Scholarship Foundation, with various other scholarships being awarded for winners of categories and recognition in other areas. Every contestant receives at a minimum $1,000 just for competing.

== See also ==
- Miss Rodeo USA
- Professional Rodeo Cowboys Association
