= Mr Gay Wales =

Gay male beauty contest

Mr Gay Wales (Welsh: Mr Hoyw Cymru) is a Welsh gay male beauty pageant. It was founded in 2005 as part of the Cardiff Mardi Gras (gay pride) celebrations, but is now an independent contest.

Heats are held at gay venues around the country with the winner of each heat representing that venue or city in the final.

As well as gaining the title Mr Gay Wales, the winner also has the opportunity of representing Wales in the Mr Gay Europe contest. From 2007, the winner also competed at international level in the Mr Gay International Contest in Hollywood, United States.

== Past winners ==
- 2016 – Paul Davies
- 2017 – Ben Brown

== See also ==
- Mr Gay World
