= Mr Gay Sweden =

Gay male beauty contest

Mr Gay Sweden was a beauty pageant for gay Swedes. The contest was held at Berns in Berzelii Park, Stockholm, Sweden. It was created by the Swedish gay magazine and Internet community Qruiser in 1999. Since 2005, the winner represented the country at the Mr Gay Europe pageant. The winner was traditionally announced by SMS-voting after hot picks by a panel of celebrity judges. It was cancelled in 2018.

== Past winners ==
- 2025 - Haris Eloy
- 2018 – cancelled
- 2017 – Samuel Bälter
- 2015 – 2016 (ingen tävling)
- 2014 – Anton Ljungberg
- 2013 – Jack Johansson
- 2012 – Fritiof Ingelhammar (plus QX readers' favourite: Jakob Prim)
- 2011 – Kristian Sääf
- 2010 – Simon Forsberg
- 2009 – Christo Willesen
- 2008 – Mirza "Mirre"
- 2007 – Joachim Brattfjord Corneliusson
- 2006 – Henrik Lindholm
- 2005 – Erik Berger
- 2004 – Jörgen Tenor
- 2003 – Nicklas Ottosson
- 2002 – Cato Helleren
- 2001 – Alexander Ervik
- 2000 – Jonas Hedqvist
- 1999 – Jesper Wallin
