= Miss Heritage Zimbabwe =

Miss Heritage Zimbabwe is a national beauty pageant celebrating the culture and heritage of Zimbabwe. The pageant is organized by Kenakor Media. The 2015 Miss Heritage Zimbabwe was Francina Katuruza.

The winner of the competition can represent Zimbabwe in the Miss Heritage Global Pageant. The pageant's mission is to promote and enhance Zimbabwe's local culture, heritage and traditions.

== History ==
The pageant was first held in 2012, when Melissa Chaka was crowned as the winner. She represented Zimbabwe in the Miss Heritage Global Pageant, held in Sandton, South Africa.

== Winners ==
Year	Name
2020	Eva Mzondiwa
2015	Francina Katuruza
2014	Tendai Rukwava
2013	Thabiso Phiri
2012	Melissa Chaka
