= Miss Rodeo USA =

Beauty pageant

Miss Rodeo USA is an annual pageant to select the official spokesperson for the International Professional Rodeo Association (IPRA).

== History ==
The Miss Rodeo USA Association has represented the IPRA for six decades. The pageant is open to cowgirls around the nation, who have won the title each January at the International Finals Rodeo (IFR).

== Winners ==
This is a list of women who have won the Miss Rodeo USA crown.

2026	Ashley Polson	Kentucky
2025	Megan Kelly	California
2024	Kaelanne Quiñónez	Texas
2023	Anna Woolsey	Oklahoma
2022	Jessie Lynn Nichols	Alabama
2021	Kylee Campbell	Alabama
2020	Brooke Wallace	Kansas
2019	Heather Morison	Iowa
2018	Summer Weldon	Tennessee
2017	Brittany Howard	Kentucky
2016	Harmony Latham	California
2015	Kirbi Allen	Arkansas
2014	Elisa Swenson	California
2013	Lauren Terry	Alabama
2012	Trisha Smeenk	South Dakota
2011	Katie Barger	Arkansas
2010	Dakota Missildine	Alabama
2009	Jamie Virden	Washington
2008	Kristin Scott	Alabama
2007	Candice Carper	California
2006	Stacy Jo Johnson	Wyoming
2005	Joanna Blackwell	Texas
2004	Katie Woods	California
2003	Leslie Burgreen	Alabama
2002	Georgiana Abdo	Oklahoma
2001	Rebecca Passion	Alabama
2000	Marjon Brady	Arizona
1999	Bobbie Jo Loomis	Oklahoma
1998	Kimberly Williams	Idaho
1997	Donna Stricklen	Texas
1996	Kimberly Bullard	Texas
1995	Amy Hettich	Wyoming
1994	Lucynda Henrick	Oklahoma
1993	Karen Ranswieler	California
1992	Lana Grubb	Texas
1991	Lorraine Keogh	California
1990	Nicki Barefoot	Alabama
1989	Lisa Watson	Oklahoma
1988	Bobbie Kay Tate	Texas
1987	Paige Hoffman	Alabama
1986	Carmen Knepper	Nevada
1985	Catherine Santee	Oklahoma
1984	Robin Vroman	Oklahoma
1983	Teresa Bailey	Alabama
1982	Bobbie Newman	California
1981	Laura Akers	California
1980	Diana Parsons	Alabama
1979	Sheri Howell	Oklahoma
1978	Nancy Sides	California
1977	Katie Kiebler	Missouri
1976	Jackie Hayes	Tennessee
1975	Billie Ruth Elrod	Texas
1974	Terry Jo Langford	Florida
1973	Sandra Garnett	New Mexico
1972	Brenda Jowers	Louisiana
1971	Mary Ellen Maxwell	Ohio
1970	Diana Flynn	Oklahoma
1969	Donna McLaughlin	Texas
1968	Linda Lindsay	Texas
1967	Sandra Polovkas	Texas
1966	Donna Gittleson	

== Miss Teen Rodeo USA ==
The inaugural Miss Teen Pageant, for ages 13-17, was held mid-July, 2021, at the International Finals Youth Rodeo (IFYR) in Shawnee, Oklahoma. Contestants must be able to perform a Horsemanship pattern and ride in a Grand entry. Lana Carter of Crossett, Arkansas, was the winner.

== See also ==
- Miss Rodeo America
- International Professional Rodeo Association
