= Miss San Marino =

National beauty pageant for unmarried women

Miss San Marino is a national beauty pageant for unmarried women in San Marino. The winners have represented their country at Miss International in 2000 and 2001, and Miss Europe in 2001 and 2002.

== Winners ==
Color key

- Declared as Winner
- Ended as runner-up
- Ended as one of the finalists or semifinalists

Year	Miss San Marino	Notes
1996	Alessandra Gessi	
1997	Claudia Zannoni	
1998	Eva Neri	
1999	Francesca Guidi	
2000	Chiara Valentini	
2001	Marzia Bellesso	Top 15 at Miss International 2001
2002	Melania Astolfi	
2015	Glenda Canavese	Top 16 at Miss Intercontinental 2015

== See also ==
- Miss Italy
