= List of Pakistani films of 2026 =

List of Pakistani films by year 2026

This is a list of notable Pakistani films that are scheduled to be released in 2026.

The top highest-grossing Pakistani films released in 2026, by worldwide box office gross revenue, are as follows.

Background color indicates the current releases

Highest-grossing films of 2026
Rank	Title	Studio	Gross	Ref.
1	Aag Lagay Basti Mein	Big Bang Entertainment; ARY Films; Salman Iqbal Films	Rs. 101.06 crore (US$3.6 million)	
2	Zombeid	Filmwala Pictures	Rs. 35 crore (US$1.3 million)	
3	Bullah	Shake Films	Rs. 17.84 crore (US$640,000)	

== January–March ==
Opening		Title	Director	Cast	Production company	Ref.
M A R	21	Aag Lagay Basti Mein	Bilal Atif Khan	Fahad Mustafa; Mahira Khan; Javed Sheikh; Tabish Hashmi; Samra Shehzaadi; Salahuddin Tunio	Big Bang Entertainment; Salman Iqbal Films; ARY Films	
M A R	21	Delhi Gate	Nadeem Cheema	Jawed Sheikh; Shafqat Cheema; Roma Micheal; Khalid Butt; Yasser Khan; Suzain Fatima	Sky Fall Films	
M A R	21	Bullah	Shoaib Khan	Shaan Shahid; Sara Loren; Saleem Sheikh; Naeema Butt; Adnan Butt	Shake Films	

== April–June ==
Opening		Title	Director	Cast	Production company	Ref.
M A Y	8	Mera Lyari	Abu Aleeha	Ayesha Omar; Dananeer Mobeen; Samiya Mumtaz; Nayyar Ejaz; Adnan Shah Tipu	Hawksbay Productions	
M A Y	27	Luv Di Saun	Imran Malik	Farhan Saeed; Mamya Shajaffar; Babar Ali	ARY Films; Parvez Malik Films; Salman Iqbal Films	
M A Y	27	Psycho	Shaan Shahid	Shaan Shahid; Meera; Sonya Hussyn	Red Lipstick Productions	
M A Y	27	Zombeid	Nabeel Qureshi	Fahad Mustafa; Mehwish Hayat; Babar Ali	Filmwala Pictures	

== October–December ==
Opening		Title	Director	Cast	Production company	Ref.
O C T	2	Sheroes	Saqib Khan; Badar Mehmood	Zara Noor Abbas; Ushna Shah; Kinza Hashmi	Geo Films; Sindh Films; Tamasha Films; Orient Distribution	
O C T	16	Mango Jutt	Abu Aleeha	Faysal Quraishi; Hareem Farooq; Shamoon Abbasi	Hameem Productions	
O C T	30	Ghost School	Seemab Gul	Nazualiya Arsalan; Samina Seher; Adnan Shah Tipu; Vajdaan Shah	Cinelava; Red Balloon Film	
N O V	6	Aashiq Rang Rangeelay	Riaz Malik	Iftikhar Thakur; Naseem Vicky; Bushra Gulfam; Abbas Ashraf; Hamza Shafiq; Dua Khan	Maa Productions	
N O V	13	The Colour of My Heart (Rang Hai Dil Ka Mere)	Umar Riaz	Zia Mohyeddin; Dr. Arfa Sayeda Zehra; Azra Mohyeddin; Salima Hashmi; Moneeza Hashmi; Nahid Siddiqui	Asna Pictures	

== See also ==
- List of highest-grossing Pakistani films
- List of highest-grossing films in Pakistan
- Lists of Pakistani films
