= Sayyid Mumtaz Ali =

Indian Islamic scholar

Mawlānā Sayyid Mumtaz Ali
- Title: Shams al-Ulama

Personal life
- Born: 27 September 1860 Deoband, British India
- Died: 15 June 1935 (aged 74) Lahore, British India
- Spouse: Muhammadi Begum
- Children: Imtiaz Ali Taj (son)
- Notable work(s): Tehzeeb-e-Niswan, Huquq-e-Niswan, Tafṣīl al-bayān fī maqāṣid al-Qurʼān
- Education: Darul Uloom Deoband
- Relatives: Yasmeen Tahir (granddaughter); Naeem Tahir (grandson); Ali Tahir (great-grandson); Faran Tahir (great-grandson)

Religious life
- Religion: Islam
- Denomination: Sunni Islam
- Founder of: Rifah-e-Aam Press
- Movement: Deobandi

Senior posting
- Teacher: Muhammad Yaqub Nanautawi and Muhammad Qasim Nanautawi

Sayyid Mumtaz Ali Deobandi (27 September 1860 – 15 June 1935) was an Indian Sunni Muslim scholar and an advocate of women rights in the late 19th century. He was an alumnus of Darul Uloom Deoband. His book Huquq-e-Niswan and the journal Tehzeeb-e-Niswan that he started with his wife Muhammadi Begum are said to be pioneering works on women rights.

== Biography ==
Sayyid Mumtaz Ali was born on 27 September 1860 in Deoband, British India. He was a fellow and contemporary of Mahmud Hasan Deobandi and studied at Darul Uloom Deoband with Muhammad Yaqub Nanautawi and Muhammad Qasim Nanautawi.

After graduating from the Deoband seminary, Mumtaz Ali moved to Lahore and established a publishing house "Darul Isha'at". On 1 July 1898, he released a journal Tehzeeb-e-Niswan under the editorship of his wife Muhammadi Begum. This journal continued till 1949. In 1898, he started a publishing house called "Rifah-e-Aam Press" in Lahore which is said to the first press in Lahore whose owner was a Muslim. In 1905, he started a journal, called, Mushīr-e-Mādar (Advisor to the mother), and then the children's journal Phūl (Flower) in 1909, and laid the foundation of children's literature in Urdu.

Mumtaz Ali was honoured with title of "Shams-ul-Ulama" (lit: "Sun of Scholars") by the Government of British India in 1934. He died on 15 June 1935 in Lahore.

== Literary works ==
- Huquq-e-Niswan
- Taz̲kiratulanbiyā
- Tafṣīl al-bayān fī maqāṣid al-Qurʼān (6 volumes)
- Naqsh bo uṭhe

== Legacy ==
American historian, Gail Minault argues in her article "Sayyid Mumtaz Ali and 'Huquq un-Niswan': An Advocate of Women's Rights in Islam in the Late Nineteenth Century" that, Mumtaz Ali's "Huquq-e-Niswan was undoubtedly too far in advance of its times. Given the current debate about the importance of Muslim personal reform, however, it is well to remember this early champion of women rights in the shar'iat." Commending Mumtaz Ali's work, Tafṣīl al-bayān fī maqāṣid al-Qurʼān, former Grand Mufti of Jerusalem, Amin al-Husseini, comments that "such book does not exist even in the Arab world". This 6 volume work of Mumtaz Ali on the Quran also received praise from scholarly figures including Anwar Shah Kashmiri, Abul Kalam Azad and Syed Sulaiman Nadwi.
