= Samjhauta Express (TV series) =

Pakistani television series

- Also known as: Samjhota Express
- Genre: Drama
- Written by: Naeem Tahir
- Directed by: Ali Tahir
- Starring: Zeba Bakhtiar; Farhan Ally Agha; Noman Ijaz; Naeem Tahir; Ali Tahir; Nayyar Ejaz
- Country of origin: Pakistan
- Original language: Urdu

Production
- Producer: Ali Tahir
- Production company: Tahir Productions

Original release
- Network: PTV Home
- Release: 2012

Samjhauta Express or Samjhota Express (Urdu: سمجھوتا ایکسپریس) is a 2012 Pakistani drama television serial about the 2007 Samjhauta Express bombings. Written by Naeem Tahir, directed and produced by Ali Tahir, the serial aired on PTV Home. It stars Zeba Bakhtiar, Farhan Ally Agha, Noman Ijaz, Naeem Tahir, Ali Tahir and Nayyar Ejaz.

== Cast and characters ==
- Zeba Bakhtiar as Shaista
- Farhan Ally Agha as Azhar
- Nauman Ijaz as Prasad Shrikant Purohit
- Bushra Ansari as Kaveeta Karkari
- Naeem Tahir
- Ali Tahir as Sajjad Mubeen
- Nayyar Ejaz as Bhatadia
- Asma Abbas as Kamini
- Irsa Ghazal as Pragya Singh Thakur
- Amir Qureshi
- Nayyar Ejaz
- Omair Rana
- Tahira Syed
- Sara Razi as Ayesha
  - Arisha Razi as Ayesha (young)
- Zainab

== See also ==
- Sevak: The Confessions
