= Nazar ul Hassan =

Pakistani actor

Nazar ul Hassan is a Pakistani actor. He works predominantly in theater and television, though he has also appeared in films. A graduate of National Academy of Performing Arts, he started his acting career from theatre and won Best Actor Award at Mumbai International Film Festival for his performance in Kachrachi (2018). He appeared in the web series Sevak: The Confessions (2022). In 2023, he appeared as Daad Saein in Green Entertainment's Jindo (2023).

== Career ==
In 2022, he played the role of Manu in Anjum Shahzad's directorial controversial web series Sevak: The Confessions. He was praised for his portrayal of a good-for-nothing landlord in the television series Jindo.

== Filmography ==
=== Theater ===
- Jasoosi Dunya (2018)
- Raagni (2018)
- King Lear (2019)
- 100 Din Chor Kay (2022)

=== Film ===
Year	Title	Role	Notes
2016	Jeewan Hathi		short film
2017	Darzi Ki Marzi	Master tailor	
2018	Na Maloom Afraad 2	Thaakrey	
2018	Kachrachi		short film

=== Television ===
Year	Title	Role	Notes
2017	Mohabbat.pk		
2018	Visaal	Tariq/ Munna	
2019	Bhook	Aziz	
2023	Jindo	Daad Saein	

=== Web series ===
Year	Title	Role	Notes
2022	Sevak: The Confessions	Manu	

== Awards and nominations ==
Year	Ceremony	Category	Project	Result
2018	Mumbai International Film Festival	Best Actor	Kachrachi	Won
