= Hijab Imtiaz Ali =

Indo-Pakistani writer and pilot (1908-1999)

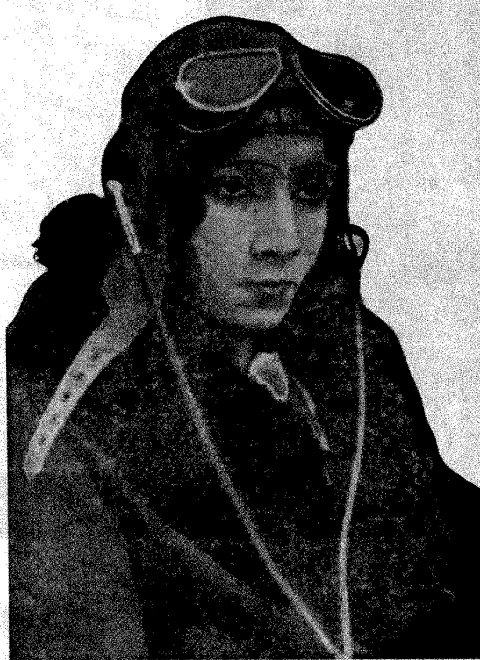
- Born: 1908; Hyderabad, Hyderabad State, British India (now Hyderabad, India)
- Died: 19 March 1999 at age 90 or 91; Lahore, Punjab, Pakistan
- Occupations: Writer, editor, pilot
- Spouse: Imtiaz Ali Taj
- Children: Yasmeen Tahir (daughter)
- Relatives: Naeem Tahir (son-in-law); Faran Tahir (grandson); Ali Tahir (grandson)

Hijab Imtiaz Ali (1908–1999) was a Pakistani writer, editor and diarist. She is a pioneer of romanticism and a well known name in Urdu literature. She is also considered the first female Muslim pilot after she obtained her official pilot license in 1936, although Zuleykha Seyidmammadova from Soviet Azerbaijan had qualified as a pilot two years earlier, in 1934.

== Personal life ==
Hijab was born in 1908 in Madras, British India. Madras was known as Madras Presidency at that time and she was born in a town on the banks Palar River known as Vaniyambadi. She had her primary education at The London Mission School of Vaniyambadi. Later her family moved to the princely state of Hyderabad Deccan. Her mother, Abbasi Begum, was a writer who wrote for Tehzeeb-e-Niswan.

Hijab is a notable name in Urdu literature. She started writing at a very young age. One of her best-known works "Meri Natamam Mohabbat", which is considered one of the best love stories ever written in Urdu literature, was written at the age of twelve.

In the 1930s, Hijab married Imtiaz Ali Taj, a well-known writer and journalist who wrote for many films, dramas and radio channels. She moved to Lahore with him. Hijab had one daughter, Yasmeen Tahir who went on to become a notable voice for Radio Pakistan. Hijab's grandsons, Faran Tahir and Ali Tahir are well-known actors.

== Career ==
=== Pilot ===
Hijab was passionate about flying. She trained at the Lahore Flying Club and also took part in many competitions organised by the club. Hijab obtained her pilot's license in 1936. In 1939, The International Women’s News reported that Hijab had become the first Muslim woman in the British Empire to obtain an ‘A’ license as an air pilot. Sarla Thakral, is often claimed as the first Indian pilot, however, both Sarla and Hijab obtained the license around the same time but Hijab was the first to do so.

=== Writer ===
Hijab, whose writing career spans more than 60 years, is known for her romantic stories in Urdu literature. Her stories revolve around romance, women, nature and psychology. Her writing was often related to reality and contained a lot of imagery of life. Her repeated use of words and a unique construction of sentences, stands out in her writing. Hijab's stories used the same characters in different stories and scenarios. Some of the famous and memorable characters from her novels are Dr Gaar, Sir Harley, Dadi Zubeida, and Habshan Zonash.

Hijab became an author at an early age. She published her first short story at the age of 9. Her story was published in 'Tehzeeb-e-Niswan' and was well received by the readers. Her stories were published by two popular magazines of the era, namely ‘Tehzeeb-e-Nizwaan’ and ‘Phool’. She also worked as an editor for both the magazines. At the age of 12, Hijab wrote her first novel "Meri Natamam Mohabbat" which is considered one of the best love stories written in the Urdu language. Some of her other famous works include Lail-o-Nehar, Sanober Kay Saey Mein and Tasveer-e-Butaa’n. She is considered the first woman in the Indian subcontinent to publish short stories that gained recognition.

She published a few short story collections and also translated Louisa May Alcott's famous novel Little Women in Urdu.

Hijab was also a diarist. Her diaries were published in magazines and some of them were also published as books. One of her novels, Mombatti ke Samne (In Front of the Candle) was based on her experiences in Lahore during the 1965 Indo-Pak war. The name came because Hijab used to write the diary in candlelight during the war blackouts. Her experience of the war also inspired her to write her award-winning novel Pagal Khana (Madhouse), which was also her last novel.

Hijab studied Sigmund Freud's work in detail and was fascinated by his concept of the subconscious mind. Freud's work provided background material for another of her great novels Andhera Khwab (Dark Dream).

== Publications ==
Some of her well-known publications are:

- Zalim Muhabbat
- Lail-o-Nehar
- Sanober Kay Saey Mein
- Adab-e-Zerin, İhtiyat-e-Aşk
- Pagal Khana (Mad House)
- Tasveer-e-Butaa’n
- Voh Baharin, Yeh Khizayan
- Andhera Khwab (Dark Dream)
- Meri Na Tamam Mohabbat

== Death ==
Hijab Imtiaz Ali died at her home in Model Town, Lahore on 19 March 1999 at age 90 or 91.

== See also ==
- Qurratulain Hyder
- Ismat Chughtayi
