= Virasat =

Virasat may refer to:

- Virasat (1997 film), a Bollywood film starring Anil Kapoor, Tabu and Pooja Batra
- Virasat (1999 film), a Pakistani Urdu-language film
- Viraasat (STAR One), a drama-series appeared on the Indian satellite television network STAR One
- Virasaat (Sahara One), a Hindi language serial aired on the Indian satellite television network Sahara One
- Virasat (festival), a cultural festival organized by SPIC MACAY
