= Luv Di Saun =

- Poster
- Directed by: Imran Malik
- Written by: Wajid Zuberi
- Produced by: Imran Malik; Irfan Malik
- Starring: Farhan Saeed; Mamya Shajaffar; Mehrunnisa Iqbal; Rana Ejaz; Babar Ali; Tabrez Khan
- Cinematography: Syed Faisal Bukhari
- Edited by: Ali Bukhari
- Music by: Naveed Nashad; Adrian Emmanuel David
- Production companies: Salman Iqbal Films; Parvez Malik Films; ARY Films
- Distributed by: ARY Digital
- Release date: 27 May 2026
- Country: Pakistan
- Language: Urdu

Luv Di Saun is a 2026 Pakistani romantic action drama film directed and produced by Imran Malik. It stars Farhan Saeed, Mamya Shajaffar, Mehrunnisa Iqbal, Rana Ejaz, Babar Ali, and Tabrez Khan in pivotal roles.

== Plot ==
The story follows Zarshaan (Farhan Saeed), a young man who returns from abroad and falls in love with Billo (Mamya Shajaffar), a woman trapped in a life controlled by a ruthless human trafficking gang. What begins as a tender romance quickly descends into a violent, high-stakes battle as Zarshaan fights to rescue Billo from the criminal underworld. Along the way, he encounters an eccentric friend and a larger-than-life police officer (Babar Ali) who intervenes after Zarshaan is brutally beaten by the gang. Blending dark social commentary on trafficking and survival with traditional romance, the film ends on an abrupt "To Be Continued" cliffhanger, setting up a potential sequel.

== Cast ==
- Farhan Saeed as Zarshaan
- Mamya Shajaffar as Billo
- Mehrunnisa Iqbal
- Rana Ejaz
- Babar Ali
- Tabrez Khan

== Release ==
The first teaser for Luv Di Saun was released in late April 2026, building anticipation for its Eid al-Adha release. The film was released worldwide in theatres on 27 May 2026, coinciding with Eid al-Adha alongside the Pakistani films Psycho and Zombeid.

== Reception ==
=== Critical response ===
A critic of The AZB described, Luv Di Saun as a disjointed drama hampered by a weak narrative structure, pacing issues, and excessive subplots. While Farhan Saeed's lead performance, the cinematography and the soundtrack received praise, the film was ultimately criticized for poor editing and an inconsistent tone.

Raana Kanwal of Youlin Magazine, praised Luv Di Saun for Farhan Saeed and Mamya Shajaffar's performances, their strong chemistry, and the film's cinematography capturing Lahore. However, she criticized the film for its predictable storytelling, intrusive comedy and weak musical score.

Farheen Jawaid of Dawn Images, panned Luv Di Saun for its weak narrative structure, ill-fitting subplots, poor sound design and reliance on low-quality AI flashbacks. While praising Farhan Saeed's performance and the film's visuals, the review criticized its sudden plot shift and abrupt, unresolved "To Be Continued" ending.

== See also ==
- List of Pakistani films of 2026
