= Roma Michael =

Pakistani model and beauty pageant titleholder (born 1995)

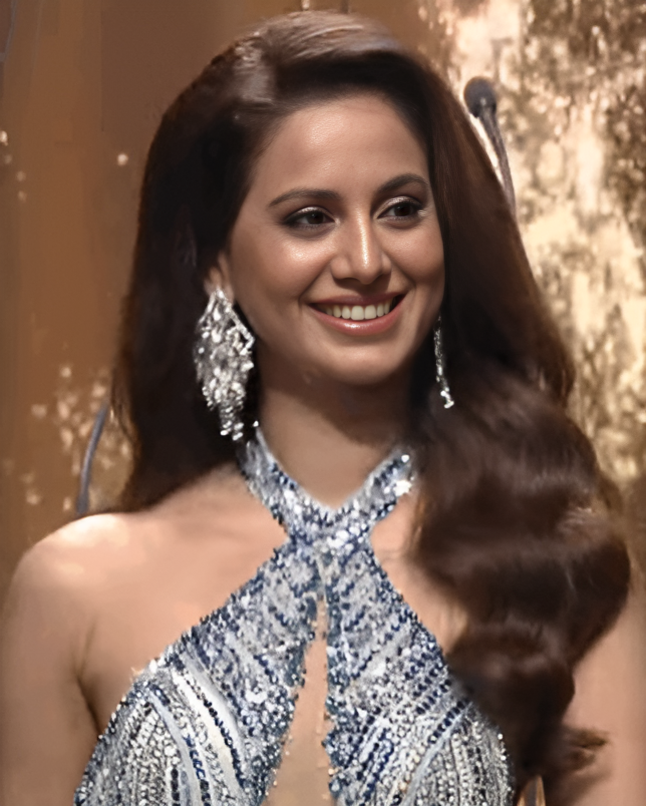
- Roma Michael in 2024
- Born: Roma Michael; 6 April 1995 (age 31); Lahore, Punjab, Pakistan
- Education: University of South Asia
- Occupations: Model; Actress
- Beauty pageant titleholder
- Title: Miss Grand Pakistan 2024 Miss Charm Pakistan 2023
- Years active: 2013 – present
- Major competitions: Miss Charm 2023; (Unplaced); Miss Grand International 2024; (Unplaced)

Roma Michael (born April 6, 1995) is a Pakistani model and actress. She represented Pakistan in the Miss Charm 2023 and Miss Grand International 2024.

== Early life and education ==
Michael was born and raised in Lahore, Punjab, Pakistan, into a Christian family. She holds a bachelor's degree in BTech from the University of South Asia in Lahore.

== Career ==
=== Modeling and Pageantry ===
Michael began her modeling career in 2013 and became established in the Pakistani fashion industry. Michael established a successful modeling career in Pakistan, collaborating with renowned fashion designers and brands such as HSY, Nida Azwer, and Mohsin Naveed Ranjha. She has participated in major domestic events like the Pakistan Fashion Design Council (PFDC) and Fashion Pakistan Week (FPW) from 2016 to 2019.

On the international stage, Michael has represented Pakistan at various prestigious events, including the Cannes Fashion Week, the Dubai Fashion Show, and the Miss Charm International pageant.

Transitioning into acting, Michael has appeared in several feature films and television dramas. Her filmography includes roles in Kahey Dil Jidher and Delhi Gate, while her TV appearances feature shows like Tu Zindagi Hai, Pyari Nimmo and Iqtidar.

She has worked with prominent designers and walked in national and international fashion events like PFDC, Fashion Pakistan Week, Cannes Fashion Week, and Dubai Fashion Show. In 2024, she made history as the first Pakistani representative at the Miss Grand International pageant in Thailand as Miss Grand Pakistan. She has also participated in the Miss Charm International pageant.

== Pageantry ==
In 2024, Michael was crowned Miss Grand Pakistan, making her the first Pakistani national to compete in the Miss Grand International pageant held in Thailand.

== Filmography ==
=== Television ===
Year	Title	Role	Network
2019	Tu Zindgi Hai	Sara	PTV
2023	Pyari Nimmo	Hina	Geo Entertainment
2024	Iqtidar	Amal	Green Entertainment
2026	Hadd	Mehak	Hum TV
2026	Ay Dushman-e-Jaan	Samana	Express Entertainment

=== Film ===
Year	Title	Role	Notes
2022	Kahay Dil Jidhar	Naina Ansari	
2026	Delhi Gate	Anya	
