= Rifah-e-Aam Press =

Publishing house in Lahore (1898–1935)

- Status: Defunct
- Founded: 1898
- Founder: Sayyid Mumtaz Ali
- Defunct: c. 1935
- Country of origin: British India
- Headquarters location: Lahore
- Nonfiction topics: Urdu literature
- Owner: Sayyid Mumtaz Ali

Rifah-e-Aam Press (also called Matba Rifah-i 'Am) was a publishing house in Lahore, Punjab, established by Sayyid Mumtaz Ali in 1898. The last recorded book it published was Dastoor-ul-Amal Bhatta (lit. 'Rules of Allowance') in 1935.

== Publications ==
- Farhang e Asifiya
- Ma'arka Mazhab-o-Science, Zafar Ali Khan.
- Ma'athir al-kiram, Azad Bilgrami.
