= Kalka (1989 film) =

1989 film

Kalka کالکا
- Directed by: Shahid Rana
- Screenplay by: Mazhar Anjam
- Story by: Mukhtar Gillani
- Produced by: Ahed Malik; Parvez Butt; Babar Butt
- Starring: Sultan Rahi; Anjuman; Asif Khan; Sangeeta; Kanwal Nauman; Afzaal Ahmed; Adeeb; Talish; Shafqat Cheema; Tariq Shah; Jahangir Mughal
- Cinematography: Iqbal Nimmi
- Edited by: Khalid Buki
- Music by: M. Ashraf; Zulfiqar Ali Atre
- Production company: Bari Studios
- Distributed by: Jajji films
- Release date: 7 May 1989
- Running time: 161 minutes
- Country: Pakistan
- Language: Punjabi

Kalka (Urdu: کالکا) is a 1989 Pakistani action film, directed by Shahid Rana and produced by Ahad Malik. The film stars actors Anjuman, Sultan Rahi and Afzaal Ahmed.

== Cast ==
- Sultan Rahi as (Kalka)
- Anjuman as (Noreen)
- Asif Khan as (ISP Saleem Nagra)
- Sangeeta as (Madam Babari)
- Talish as (ASP Sultan Khan)
- Kanwal Nauman
- Munir Zarif
- Nehmat Sarhadi as (Badal)
- Afzaal Ahmed - (Katwal)
- Adeeb as (Candi Wala)
- Munawar Saeed as (Deputy Haq Nawaz)
- Jahangir Mughal as (Shola)
- Zahir Shah as (Babbar)
- Altaf Khan as (Jimmy)
- Shafqat Cheema as (Qasim)
- Tariq Shah as (Fakharuddin)
- Nasrrullah Butt as (Tiger)

=== Guests actors ===
- Asad Bukhari as Tari Wal
- Tanzeem Hassan
- Asim Bukhari as (APAHAJ)
- Zamurd
- Saiqa as Salma
- Shahida Mini
- Ilyas Kashmiri as (Judge)
- Bahar as (Lawyer)

== Awards ==
- Nigar Award for Sultan Rahi as Best Actor in Punjabi-language film Kalka (1989).

== Soundtrack ==
The music of Kalka is composed by Zulfiqar Ali Atre with lyrics penned by Waris Ludhyanvi.

کالکا Kalka

Soundtrack album by Zulfiqar Ali Atre
- Released: 1989
- Recorded: 1989
- Genre: Film soundtrack
- Length: 27:44
- Language: Punjabi
- Label: Super Musical
- Director: Shahid Rana
- Producer: Ahed Malik

Zulfiqar Ali Atre chronology
Insaniyat Kay Dushman (1990)	کالکا; Kalka (1989)	Kamyabi (1984)

=== Track listing ===
No.	Title	Artist(s)	Length
1.	"Saray Deewaneya Nu Welcome"	Noor Jehan	4:33
2.	"Dil Da Faisla Hay"	Noor Jehan	4:57
3.	"Kalka O Kalka"	Noor Jehan	5:16
4.	"Ja Ve Ja Jhutheya"	Noor Jehan	4:18
5.	"Door Door Reh Ke Kahnu"	Noor Jehan	4:12
6.	"Tere Ishq Di Chubh Gai"	Noor Jehan	4:28
