= Delhi Gate (film) =

2026 Pakistani film by Nadeem Cheema

- Directed by: Nadeem Cheema
- Written by: M. Kamal Pasha
- Starring: Jawed Sheikh; Shafqat Cheema; Roma Michael; Khalid Butt; Yasser Khan; Suzain Fatima
- Cinematography: M. A. Mustafa
- Music by: Sanvel Khan M. Meesam Ali (assistant)
- Production companies: Sky Fall Films; Nadeem Cheema Films
- Release date: 21 March 2026
- Country: Pakistan
- Language: Urdu

Delhi Gate is a 2026 Pakistani romantic comedy action film directed by Nadeem Cheema with a story written by M. Kamal Pasha. The film follows two strangers, Aamir, a struggling journalist, and Anya, a software engineer with a secret, who cross paths at the iconic Delhi Gate, of the Walled City of Lahore, Pakistan. After witnessing a shocking event, they become entangled in a conspiracy that links powerful figures to a dangerous underground network. The film stars Jawed Sheikh, Shafqat Cheema, Roma Michael, Khalid Butt, Yasser Khan, and Suzain Fatima.

== Cast ==
- Jawed Sheikh
- Shafqat Cheema
- Roma Michael as Anya
- Khalid Butt
- Yasser Khan
- Suzain Fatima
- DJ Fluke
- DJ Henaary

== Production ==
Originally, the cast consisted of Saud, Rashid Mehmood and Umer Cheema, but some of the cast members were later replaced. The film was made in the city of Lahore, the first in a long time as most filmmaking had moved to Karachi from Lahore.

== Release ==
The film's release was announced for 2020, but because of the COVID-19 pandemic it was delayed. In 2022, Shamoon Abbasi revealed that the film will be released in mid-2022. The film is scheduled for a nationwide theatrical release across Pakistan on Eid ul Fitr 2026, Delhi Gate Film Distributed Nationwide by Empire Productions. The film was released in Pakistani cinemas during Eid al-Fitr 2026, alongside other local releases including Aag Lagay Basti Mein and Bullah.

== Reception ==
=== Critical response ===
Writing for Youlin Magazine, Aroosh Ammad offered a critical review of Delhi Gate, noting that despite its visually appealing cinematography and setting in the historic Walled City of Lahore, the film suffered from a convoluted narrative and weak character development. Fatima observed that while the movie attempted to blend romance, action, and local culture, it was burdened by an overcrowded cast and disjointed pacing that diminished its overall impact. Writing for Dawn, Muhammad Suhayb noted that, Nadeem Cheema's film Delhi Gate suffered from severe production delays after starting in 2020, ultimately struggling to make an impact at the box office upon its eventual Eid ul-Fitr release. Suhayb also noted that, the film was primarily marked by tragic off-screen events, featuring posthumous appearances and contributions from key figures who passed away prior to its release, including veteran actors Qavi Khan and Khalid Butt, as well as screenwriter Muhammad Kamal Pasha.

== See also ==
- List of Pakistani films of 2026
