= Sevak: The Confessions =

Pakistani web series

- Title screen
- Written by: Saji Gul
- Directed by: Anjum Shahzad
- Starring: Hajra Yamin; Mohsin Abbas Haider; Nayyar Ejaz; Adnan Jaffar
- Country of origin: Pakistan
- Original languages: Urdu; Hindi
- No. of episodes: 8

Production
- Camera setup: Multi-camera

Original release
- Release: 26 November 2022

Sevak: The Confessions is a Pakistani action thriller web series directed by Anjum Shahzad and is originally streaming on Vidly. The series released weekly on the platform with the first episode being released on 26 November 2022. It stars an ensemble cast of Hajra Yamin, Mohsin Abbas Haider, Adnan Jaffar, Nayyar Ejaz, Nazarul Hassan and Ammara Malik. Set in India, the series claims to be based on true events from 1984 (1984 anti-Sikh riots) to 2022 about purported human rights violations by Hindutva groups in India, including in Punjab and religious and caste-related violence.

== Cast ==
- Hajra Yamin as Vidya (based on Gauri Lankesh)
- Mohsin Abbas Haider as Diljeet Singh (based on Deep Sidhu)
- Adnan Jaffar as Inspector Karkaray
- Nayyar Ejaz as Swami Ji
- Nazarul Hassan as Manu
- Ali Ammar as Junaid Khan
- Fahad Hashmi as Vinayak
- Bushra Yasmin as Pragya Thakur
- Ammara Malik as Dilpreet
- Carl Von Urban as Graham Stains

== Production ==
=== Release ===
The first teaser of the series was released in early November 2022 and the first episode was released on 26 November 2022 on Vidly. The series has eight episodes.

On 12 December 2022, India's Ministry of Information and Broadcasting banned the web series along with Vidly as it portrayed "a distorted version of sensitive historical events pertaining to India."

== See also ==
- Ayodhya dispute
- 2002 Gujarat violence
- Khairlanji massacre
- 2006 Malegaon bombings
- Sutlej Yamuna link canal
- Caste system in India
