= Yasmeen Tahir =

Pakistani radio host (1937–2025)

- یاسمین طاہر
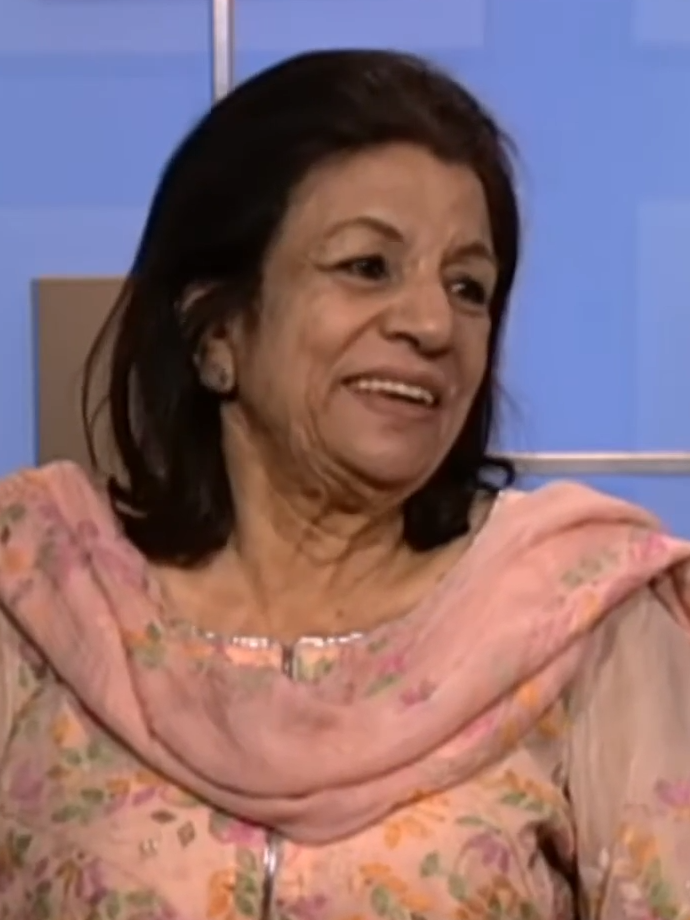
- Tahir in 2016
- Born: Yasmeen Imtiaz; 1937; Lahore, Punjab Province, British India
- Died: 19 July 2025 (aged 88); Lahore, Punjab, Pakistan
- Education: University of California, Los Angeles
- Occupations: Actress; radio artist; writer; host
- Years active: 1958–2025
- Spouse: Naeem Tahir (m. 1960)
- Children: Ali Tahir (son); Faran Tahir (son); Mehran Tahir (son)
- Parent(s): Imtiaz Ali Taj (father); Hijab Imtiaz Ali (mother)
- Relatives: Muhammadi Begum (grandmother); Sayyid Mumtaz Ali (grandfather)
- Awards: Sitara-i-Imtiaz (Star of Excellence) Award by the Government of Pakistan (2015)

Yasmeen Tahir (1937 – 19 July 2025) was a Pakistani actress, radio artist, host and writer. She worked for Radio Pakistan for more than three decades.

== Early life ==
Born in Lahore in 1937 and educated at the Convent and Kinnaird College, Yasmeen pursued acting during her time in the Government College Dramatics Club, despite the societal constraints of her time.

== Career ==
In 1958, after completing her master's degree, Yasmeen joined Radio Pakistan and served as a publicity officer. Her career in radio broadcasting began before the partition of India when she joined the Lahore Radio Station as a children's program host. Subsequently, she introduced Western music to Pakistani radio when she hosted the Western music request show. She is known for hosting the morning show Saat Rang for over 12 years, where her listeners resonated personally with her commentary.

During the Indo-Pakistani war of 1965, Yasmeen hosted Fauji Bhaiyon Ka Programme for military personnel, which had extended airtime during the war and was the first call-in show on Pakistani radio. Her live program featured conversations between the singer Noor Jehan and the soldiers which helped boost their morale.

Yasmeen also did programmes from Voice of America and BBC, although she noted a lack of the personal rapport she had with her Pakistani audience.

Yasmeen hosted another popular morning program called Subah Savere, which ran for more than three and a half years.

In 1970, she interviewed ghazal singer Mehdi Hassan on Radio Pakistan and she asked about his entry in the music industry.

She declined an offer from the Director-General of Pakistan Broadcast Corporation to lead FM 101, citing her dissatisfaction with modern radio's casual usage of different languages.

In 2018, she was cast in the drama Mohini Mansion Ki Cinderellayain along with Shabnam, Naeem Tahir, Faryal Gohar and Usama Khan. Her broadcasting career spanned 37 years, during which she acted in plays, hosted talk shows and other formats.

== Personal life ==
Yasmeen was born to Imtiaz Ali Taj and Hijab Imtiaz Ali. In 1960, Yasmeen married Naeem Tahir and had three sons, Faran Tahir, Mehran Tahir and Ali Tahir. Noor Jehan sang the sehra for their marriage which was penned by the poet Faiz Ahmed Faiz. The couple pursued further education in theater at UCLA on a Rockefeller Scholarship, during which their eldest son, Faran Tahir, was born.

On 19 April 1970, her father Imtiaz Ali Taj was murdered at his home by unknown assailants. At the time of the murder, Yasmeen and Naeem were in Rawalpindi. Following the murder, Yasmeen was involved in a legal inheritance case concerning her father. Relatives of Imtiaz Ali Taj contested that they needed a share of the inheritance since Yasmeen was not a male child. It was argued in court that Imtiaz Ali Taj had converted to the Shia sect, making his children the rightful heirs, regardless of gender. This claim was supported by newspaper advertisements and the court ruled in Yasmeen's favor.

=== Death ===
Tahir died after a prolonged illness in Lahore, on 19 July 2025, at the age of 88.

== Awards and recognition ==
Tahir was awarded the Sitara-e-Imtiaz, which was presented by acting Punjab Governor Rana Muhammad Iqbal on Pakistan Day, March 23, 2015.

== Filmography ==
=== Radio programs ===
- Western music request show
- Fauji Bhaiyon Ke Liye
- Saat Rang
- Subh Savere

=== Television ===
Year	Title	Role	Network
1969	Khuda Ki Basti	Mrs. Kamal	PTV
1982	Sona Chandi	Mrs. Tafazzul	PTV
2008	Sitara	Azra	Hum TV
2018	Mohini Mansion Ki Cinderellayain	Zubeida	BOL Entertainment
