= Imtiaz Ali Taj =

Pakistani playwright (1900 - 1970)

Syed Imtiaz Ali Taj
- Born: 13 October 1900; Lahore, British India
- Died: 19 April 1970 (aged 69); Lahore, Pakistan
- Spouse: Hijab Imtiaz Ali
- Children: Yasmeen Tahir (daughter); Naeem Tahir (son-in-law)
- Parents: Sayyid Mumtaz Ali (father); Muhammadi Begum (mother)
- Relatives: Faran Tahir (grandson); Ali Tahir (grandson)
- Awards: Pride of Performance Award by the President of Pakistan in 1965

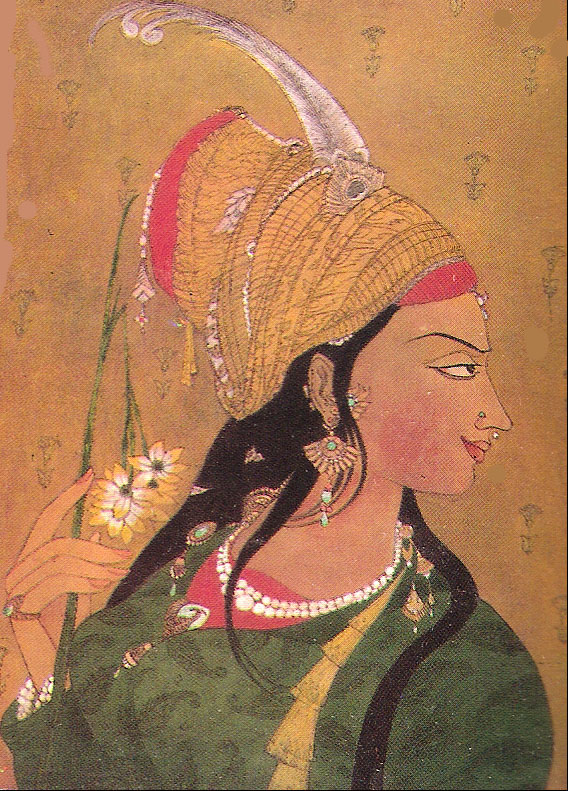
Anarkali as illustrated on the title page of Imtiaz Ali Taj's book in 1922

Syed Imtiaz Ali Taj (Urdu: سیّد امتیاز علی تاؔج; Sayyid Imtiyāz ʿAlī Tāj; 1900–1970) was a Pakistani dramatist who wrote in the Urdu language. He is best known for his 1922 play Anarkali, based on the life of Anarkali, that was staged hundreds of times and was adapted for feature films in India and Pakistan, including the Indian film Mughal-e-Azam (1960).

== Early life ==
Born Syed Imtiaz Ali in Lahore (then in British India) on 13 October 1900, he was the son of Sayyid Mumtaz Ali (1860 – 1935), who was also known as Shams-ul-Ulema (Sun of the Scholars), in recognition of his pioneering contribution to Urdu drama. His mother Muhammadi Begum lovingly nicknamed him 'Mera Taj' (my crown). His forefathers had moved to Lahore following the 1857 Indian revolt in Delhi. When Imtiaz started writing, he adopted the literary pseudonym "Taj". During his student days, his literary skill came to the fore as he translated and directed many English plays, sometimes acting in female roles at a time when girls were not encouraged to act. After studying in Lahore, he first worked in his father's publishing house, Dar-ul-Ishaat Punjab (lit: "Punjab publishing house").

He then contributed to the children's journal Phool, founded by his father on 13 October 1909 and the women's magazine Tahzeeb-e-Niswan; he wrote for Phool in association with Ghulam Abbas Ahmed and Ahmad Nadeem Qasmi. He was a co-founder (together with Maulana Abdul Majeed Salik) of the literary journal Kehkashan. He undertook many translations of Shakespeare's plays into Urdu, including A Midsummer Night's Dream as Sawan Rain Ka Sapna. He also wrote a number of plays himself, the most notable being Anarkali and Chacha Chakkan, which continue to be performed today.

== Career ==
=== Films based on his play ===
Anarkali, (literal meaning:"Bud of Pomegranate" written in 1922, is a romantic play based on a quasi-mythical legend. It tells the story of a beautiful slave girl named Anarkali (a courtesan) who falls in love with Prince Salim, but the romance ultimately leads to her tragic death. Anarkali (birth name was Nadira Begum or Sharf-un-Nissa) had come to Lahore from Iran with a traders' caravan as a young girl. She was endowed with the title of 'Anarkali' (Bud of Pomegranate) by the Mughal Emperor Akbar because she was physically very attractive. It's really amazing that Emperor Jahangir (son and successor to Emperor Akbar) who allegedly got involved romantically with this courtesan girl never mentioned her in his autobiography Tuzk-i-Jahangiri or any other historian of that time mentioned their love saga. Of course, at that time, due to the fear of disapproval by the domineering Emperor Akbar, no historian of that time would risk touching the subject. Yet this tragic love saga persisted and stayed alive among the common public and ended up becoming a popular folktale.

The first historical mention of Anarkali is found in the travelogue of the British tourist and trader, William Finch (merchant) who toured Lahore around the same time when this love saga took place - from 1608 to 1611. Finch's version of this tragic love saga is that Anarkali was actually one of the wives of Emperor Akbar and the mother of his son Danial Shah. Emperor Akbar developed suspicions that Anarkali also was romantically involved with his son Jahangir and had gone as far as committing incest with his son Jahangir. On the basis of those suspicions, he had her buried alive in the wall of Lahore Fort in 1599. Finch goes on to describe further in his version of events that Emperor Jahangir, after the death of his father and after becoming the emperor himself, had a tomb built in Lahore in memory of his beloved Anarkali in 1615.

Imtiaz Ali Taj's later-written novel Anarkali (published in 1922) is said to be "a milestone in the annals of Urdu drama". It has immortalized the tragic love story in Urdu literature as well. He modified the play in 1930, with a reprint in 1931, in the popular "modern prose genre" which became a basis for several feature films from India and Pakistan.

=== Anarkali Bazaar ===
Anarkali remains popular among the public in Pakistan and India. Lahore's popular Anarkali Bazaar is named after Anarkali, and her tomb in Lahore is a testimony to her existence.

Imtiaz Ali Taj provided a link between Agha Hashr, who was known as the "Shakespeare of India", and contemporary Pakistani playwrights. The theatre activities in Bombay and Calcutta had a strong influence from the Urdu heartland group and Taj was one of the pioneers of this group. In the post-Hashr days, Taj was considered the best playwright of the time.

In the film titled Anarkali, produced in 1953 and based on Imtiaz's plot, the ending was tragic, similar to the ending in the drama. Later the play formed the basis for the highly successful Indian feature film Mughal-e-Azam, released in 1960. In this film produced by K. Asif, there was a twist to the story through a happy ending with Emperor Akbar finally being clement towards Anarkali. Though Imtiaz Ali Taj claimed that the film had no historical authenticity, he still gave snippets of historical evidence. In the preface to his book published in 1931 (designed to impress the middle class intelligentsia), he refers to Anarkali's existence during the historical period of Emperor Akbar (1556–1605) and his son Prince Salim (later Emperor Jahangir) as well as to the Persian couplet inscribed on the marble tomb in Agra dedicated to Anarkali by her lover Prince Salim who becomes Emperor Jahangir after the death of his father. The couplet reads "Ta Kiyamat shukr geom kardgate khwesh ra, Aah garman bez benaam roo-e yare khwesh ra", meaning: "Ah! could I behold the face of my love once more, I would give thanks to my God until the day of resurrection." In writing the love story of Anarkali, a love story with hidden meanings of the times, the author's intention, according to the critic Balwant Gargi, was "to represent tyrannical forms of patriarchal authority through the relationship between Crown Prince Saleem and his father 'Akbar the Great', which Taj portrays as domineering, and a 'complex father-son relationship' marked by 'filial love interlaced with hate'."

=== Magazine ===
In 1918, Taj also published a monthly magazine called the Kahkashan from the publishing firm of Darul Ishat which he owned. Another contemporary writer, Munshi Premchand, contributed stories to this magazine in Urdu. It so happened that an article which Premchand had submitted was on the same theme on which Taj was also writing a story. Then Taj decided to drop his article in favour of the one written by Premchand, who then expressed his regret but said that at least they both were on the same wavelength.

Taj had also promoted the Lahore Arts School in association with many other stalwarts of the theatre scene in Lahore whose activities included promoting arts through a theatre and an art gallery.

Chacha Chakan (1926) is a hilarious comedy of plays for children with themes of satire and humour. Chacha Chakan is considered the funniest character in Urdu drama. Chakkan is said to be based on Jerome K. Jerome's character Uncle Podger.

Imtiaz Ali Taj also wrote short stories, novels and screenplays. From 1958, he was director of "Majlis" a translation board established in 1950, in which he republished works of Urdu literature. He was active in the theatre both as an actor and a director.

=== Radio Pakistan ===
After Pakistan gained independence in 1947, he hosted the daily feature Pakistan Hamara Hai (Pakistan is ours) on Radio Pakistan. It continued as one of the most popular radio programmes for several years.

== Death ==
On 19 April 1970, Imtiaz Ali Taj was murdered while asleep in his bed by unknown assassins. His wife, Hijab Imitiaz Ali, was seriously wounded, when she tried to rescue him.

Hijab (1908–1999) was a well-known Urdu poet and writer in her own right, and also had the distinction of being the first Muslim woman pilot of India, in 1936.

== Publications ==
Of Taj's many works, estimated at "more than 100 books", the most important publications in the Urdu language are:

- Anārkalī, about the love between Anārkalī, d. 1599, maid-servant, and Salīm, Mogul prince, later known as Jahangir, Emperor of Hindustan, 1569-1627
- Sayyid Imtiyāz ʻAlī Tāj ke yak bābī ḍrāme, one-act plays based on social themes
- Urdū kā klāsīkī adab, anthology of classical Urdu plays, includes biographical sketches and critical appreciation of the playwrights
- Rail kahānīyān̲ : rail ke safar ke daurān pesh aanay vāle intihāʼī pur isrār vāqiʻāt
- Chacha Chhakkan, Chacha Chakkan is a very funny & famous character of Urdu literature
- Gharelū āzmūdah nusk̲h̲on̲ kā insāʼiklopīḍiyā, original herbal medicines which can be prepared at home
- Majlis-i Taraqqī-yi Adab, report on the foundation, early years and publications of the institution
- Qurt̤ubah kā qāz̤ī aur dusre yakbābī khel, plays
- Lailā, yā, Muạ̄ṣira-i-G̲h̲arnātā, Urdu translation from the English of Edward Bulwer-Lytton's Leila; or, The Siege of Granada

The books written about Taj include:

- Sayyid Imtiyāz ʻAlī Tāj : shak̲h̲ṣīyyat aur fann by Gauhar Naushāhī
- Sayyid Imtiyāz ʻAlī Tāj kī tams̲īl shināsī by Muḥammad Salīm Malik
- Imtiyāz : taḥqīq va tanqīd by Muḥammad Salīm Malik
- Tāj ke ḍarāme Anārkalī par ek naẓar by Rūh Afzā Raḥmān

== Awards and recognition ==
- Pride of Performance Award in 1965 by the President of Pakistan.
- On 13 October 2001, Pakistan Post issued a commemorative postage stamp to honor him in its 'Men of Letters' series.
