= Faran Tahir =

American actor (born 1963)

Faran Haroon Tahir
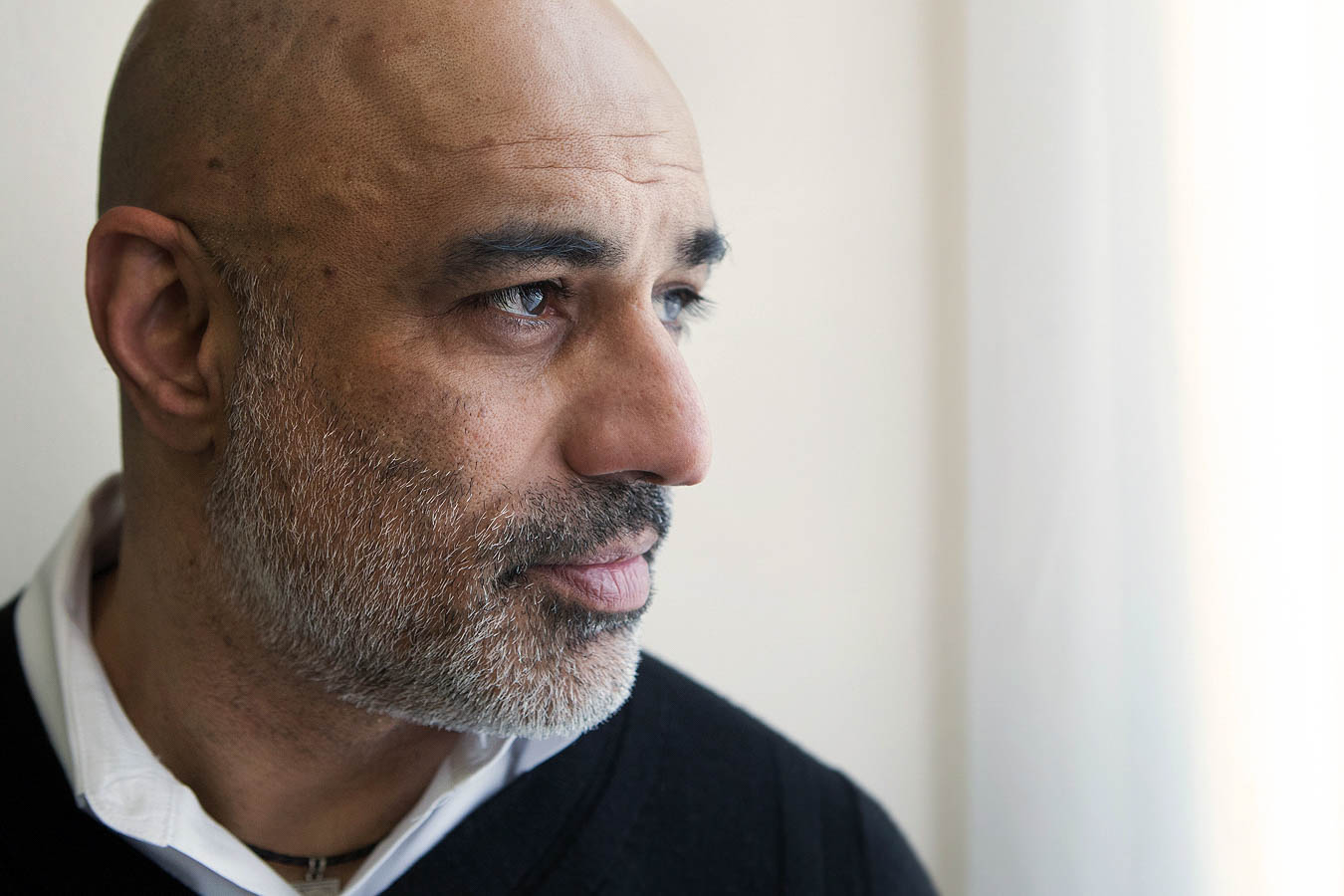
- Tahir in 2016
- Born: Faran Haroon Tahir; 16 February 1963 (age 63); Los Angeles, California, U.S.
- Education: University of California, Berkeley (BA); Harvard University (MFA)
- Occupation: Actor
- Years active: 1989–present
- Parent(s): Naeem Tahir (father); Yasmeen Tahir (mother)
- Relatives: Imtiaz Ali Taj (maternal grandfather); Hijab Imtiaz Ali (maternal grandmother); Sayyid Mumtaz Ali (maternal great-grandfather); Muhammadi Begum (maternal great-grandmother); Ali Tahir (brother)

Faran Haroon Tahir (born 16 February 1963) is a Pakistani-American actor.

Tahir made his film debut as Nathoo in Disney's 1994 film The Jungle Book. He went on to star in a variety of roles, such as Raza al-Wazar in Iron Man (2008) and miniseries VisionQuest (2026), Captain Robau in Star Trek (2009), and President Patel in Elysium (2013). In 2016, he played the title role of Othello in a production by the Shakespeare Theatre Company in Washington, D.C.

== Early life and education ==
Faran Haroon Tahir was born on 16 February 1963 in Los Angeles to Naeem Tahir, an actor and writer, and Yasmeen Tahir, a radio host. He was born in Los Angeles as his parents were studying acting and directing at the University of California (UCLA). Through his mother, "one of the most famous voices of Radio Pakistan", his grandparents are writers Imtiaz Ali Taj and Hijab Imtiaz Ali, the first Muslim female pilot. His younger brother Ali Tahir is an actor as well, best known for starring in the comedy-drama sitcom Teen Bata Teen. His other younger brother, Mehran Tahir, is a TV producer, who has worked for Hum TV. Tahir is of Punjabi descent through his father, and Muhajir descent through his mother. He grew up in Pakistan and returned to the United States in 1980.

Tahir studied business economics at the University of California, Berkeley before transitioning to the performing arts, graduating with a degree in theatre. He later graduated with a MFA from the American Repertory Theater's (A.R.T.) Institute for Advanced Theater Training at Harvard University.

== Personal life ==
From a previous marriage with Marie, Ali has a son, Javan, who has played the minor role of Ezil in Iron Man (2008), and a daughter, Lena. Later, Javan Tahir earned a PhD in applied physics from Stanford University. In 2021, Tahir married model, actor and photographer, Zara Tareen. Their marriage lasted four months. The divorce was finalized in 2023.

In addition to his screen and stage career, Tahir is an avid long-distance runner who earned the San Diego Half Marathon Triple Crown in 2015 after completing the Carlsbad, La Jolla, and America's Finest City half marathons.

== Career ==
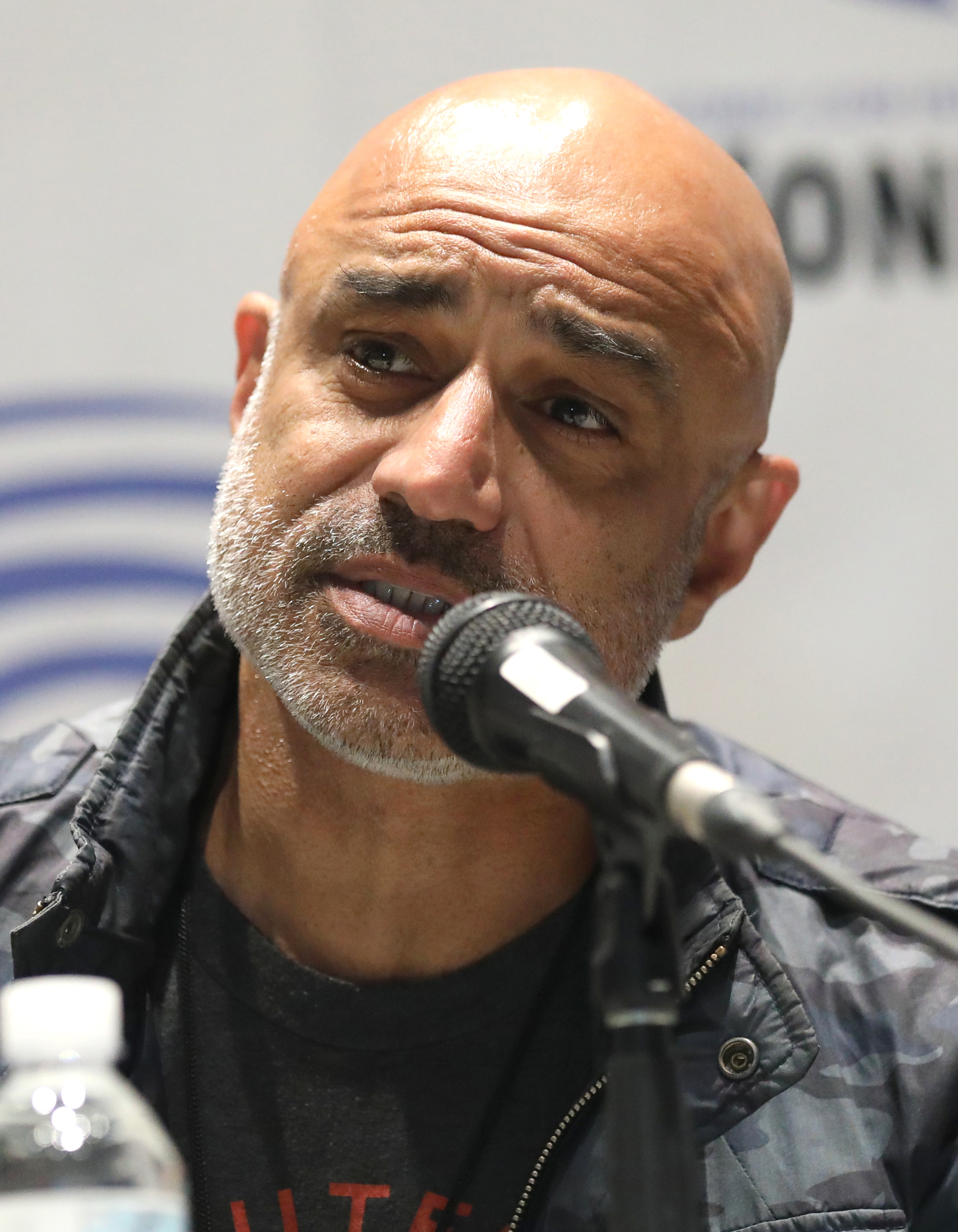
Tahir at the 2024 WonderCon

He made his film debut playing Nathoo in the Disney's 1994 live-action version of Rudyard Kipling's The Jungle Book. He has since appeared in such films as Picture Perfect (1997), Anywhere But Here (1999) and Charlie Wilson's War (2007). He also played the male lead in the 1999 independent film ABCD (1999).

In 2008, Tahir played the role of the villain Raza al-Wazar in the Marvel Comics film Iron Man.

He played Starfleet Captain Richard Robau in the 2009 film Star Trek. In 2013, Tahir played President Patel in the science-fiction film Elysium.

Tahir has guest starred on many television series, including Alias, Criminal Minds, The Practice, Family Law, The Agency, NYPD Blue, Lost, 7th Heaven, The West Wing, Walker, Texas Ranger, The D.A., 24, Monk, Justice, Cold Case, Chuck, Hawaii Five-0 and Warehouse 13. He also co-starred with Robert Beltran and Chase Masterson in the 2005 Sci-Fi Channel original movie Manticore. He also starred in the medical drama series Grey's Anatomy as Isaac and appeared on the CW series Supernatural as the Egyptian god Osiris in the seventh season's episode "Defending Your Life". Tahir starred in the ghost horror film Jinn, and in the role of Frank, Cliff Barnes' right-hand man in the revival of Dallas. In 2015 Tahir appeared in a role as the Commander on Supergirl.

He appeared in JAG in the episodes "Ice Queen" and "Meltdown" which served as the two pilot episodes for the series NCIS. Seven years later, Tahir appeared in the spin-off NCIS: Los Angeles.

In 2016 Tahir joined American Crime as Rhys Bashir, and was cast as Captain Nemo on Once Upon a Time. In 2017, Tahir played the role of Mallick in Syfy's TV show, 12 Monkeys.

On his visit to Karachi, Pakistan, he appeared in a web series Speak Your Heart With Samina Peerzada in January 2019.

In June 2024, Tahir, along with his Umrao Ayyar co-star Ali Kazmi, appeared in a vlog by PakWheels.

== Filmography ==
=== Film ===
Year	Title	Role	Notes
1994	The Jungle Book	Nathoo	
1997	Picture Perfect	Sajit	
1998	A Price Above Rubies	Hrundi Kapoor	
1998	Anywhere But Here	Hisham Badir	
1998	ABCD	Raj Mehta	
2007	Charlie Wilson's War	Brigadier Rashid	
2008	Iron Man	Raza Hamidmi al-Wazar	
2009	Star Trek	Captain Robau	
2010	Ashes	Kartik	
2013	Elysium	President Patel	
2013	Torn	Ali Munsif	
2013	Escape Plan	Javed Afridi	
2013	Mr. Jones	The Anthropologist	
2014	Jinn	Ali	
2015	Flight World War II	William Strong	
2016	Honeyglue	Dr. Konig	
2018	Mad Genius	Eden	
2019	Boris and the Bomb	Sammi	
2020	I Am Fear	Asad	
2020	I'll Meet You There	Majeed	
2021	Lamya's Poem	Baha Walad	Voice role
2021	Injustice	Ra's al Ghul	Voice role
2023	Coup!	Kaan	
2024	Umro Ayyar - A New Beginning	Laqqa	
2027	Inspector Jamshed: The Secret Parchment	Zafar Iqbal Burki	

=== Television ===
Year	Title	Role	Notes
1989	Midnight Caller	Desk Clerk	Episode: "Blood Red"
1993	Law & Order	Mr. Khan	Episode: "Profile"
1994	New York Undercover	Dr. Venegas	Episode: "Missing"
1995	New York News	Neilson	Episode: "Past Imperfect"
1997	Party of Five	Radiologist	2 episodes
1999	The Pretender	Anesthesiologist	Episode: "At the Hour of Our Death"
2000	The Practice	Dr. Michael Shields	Episode: "Death Penalties"
2000	FreakyLinks	Doctor	Episode: "Subject: Three Thirteen"
2000	Family Law	Dr. Singh	2 episodes
2001	Alias	Mokhtar	Episode: "A Broken Heart"
2001	NYPD Blue	Isa Al-Ramai	Episode: "Baby Love"
2001–2003	The Agency	Jamar Akil / India's Secret Police Leader	2 episodes
2002	7th Heaven	Mr. Halawi	Episode: "Suspicion"
2002	MDs	Dr. Banfa	Episode: "Cruel and Unusual"
2002	A Town Without Pity	Antoine Fahd	TV movie
2002–2003	The West Wing	Manny	2 episodes
2003	The Agency	Jamar Akil	Episode: "An Isolated Incident"
2003	JAG	Amad Bin Atwa / Said Labdouni	3 episodes
2003	Boston Public	Mr. Mubarik	Episode: "Chapter Seventy-Four"
2003–2005	24	Mosque Greeter / Tomas Sherek	3 episodes
2004	Judging Amy	Dr. Omidi	Episode: "The Quick and The Dead"
2004	The D.A.	Asaf Shah	Episode: "The People vs. Achmed Abbas"
2005	Over There	Hamza	Episode: "Embedded"
2005	Just Legal	Unknown	Episode: "Pilot"
2005	Manticore	Umari	TV movie
2006	Charmed	Savard	Episode: "Repo Manor"
2006	Monk	Museum Official	Episode: "Mr. Monk and the Big Reward"
2006	Justice	Oscar Rivera	Episode: "Behind the Orange Curtain"
2006	Sleeper Cell	Aziz	Episode: "Faith"
2007	Cold Case	Anil Patel	Episode: "A Dollar, A Dream"
2008	Lost	Ishmael Bakir	Episode: "The Shape of Things to Come"
2008	Chuck	Farrokh Bulsara	Episode: "Chuck Versus Tom Sawyer"
2009	Grey's Anatomy	Isaac	Episode: "Give Peace a Chance"
2010	NCIS: Los Angeles	Hassad Al-Jahiri	Episode: "Fame"
2010	Childrens Hospital	Malik	Episode: "The Sultan's Finger: Live"
2010–2013	Warehouse 13	Adwin Kosan	11 episodes
2011	Blue Bloods	El Haq	Episode: "Hall of Mirrors"
2011	In Plain Sight	Ali Tavali	Episode: "A Womb with a View"
2011	Supernatural	Osiris	Episode: "Defending Your Life"
2012	Burn Notice	Ahmad Damour	Episode: "Last Rites"
2012–2013	Dallas	Frank 'Smiling Frank'	8 episodes
2013	Private Practice	Charles	Episode: "Full Release"
2014	Elementary	Agent Mattoo	Episode: "The Diabolical Kind"
2014	Crisis	Tariq Rind	Episode: "If You Are Watching This I Am Dead"
2014–2015	Criminal Minds	Tivon Askari	2 episodes
2015	The Blacklist	Ruslan Denisov	Episode: "Ruslan Denisov (No. 67)"
2015	Supergirl	The Commander	Episode: "Pilot"
2015	How to Get Away with Murder	Terrence Amos	Episode: "Hello Raskolnikov"
2015	Satisfaction	Omar Sandhal	Recurring role in season 2
2016	American Crime	Rhys Bashir	6 episodes
2016	Hawaii Five-0	'Lucky' Morad	Episode: "No ke ali'i wahine a me ka 'aina"
2016–2017	Once Upon a Time	Captain Nemo	3 episodes
2017	Prison Break: Resurrection	Jamil	Season 5
2017	Scandal	President Rashad	Season 7
2017	Shameless	Adeeb Singh	Episode: "Where's My Meth?"
2017–2018	12 Monkeys	Mallick	7 episodes
2018	The Magicians	The Great Cock of the Darkling Woods	Episode: "The Tales of the Seven Keys"
2018	Madam Secretary	President Tarindo Nandasiri	Episode: "Reading the Signs"
2019	MacGyver	The Fence	Episode: "Fence + Suitcase + Americium-241"
2019	FBI	Ravi Sharma	Episode: "Undisclosed"
2022	Mira, Royal Detective	Sher (voice)	Episode: "Mira's Musical Mystery Tour/The Case of the Mystery Mehfil"
2022	The Old Man	Rahmani	3 episodes
2026	Leader	Agha	
2026	Bas Tera Saath Ho	Mursaleen	
2026	Tapish	Taimur Ali Khan	
2026	Dar-e-Nijaat	Habib	
2026	VisionQuest	Raza Hamidmi al-Wazar	Episode: "Deadlock"

=== Video games ===
Year	Title	Role	Notes
2015	Call of Duty: Black Ops III	General Abasi Hakim	Voice and motion capture
2023	Dead Space	Challus Mercer	

=== Stage ===
Year	Title	Role	Notes
2016	Othello	Othello	
2019	Bhai Bhai	Buddy	
