= Geo Sar Utha Kay =

Pakistani film

- Teaser poster
- جیو سر اُٹھا کے
- Directed by: Nadeem Cheema
- Written by: Nasir Mehmood
- Produced by: Nadeem Cheema; Mian Anwar Ul Haq
- Starring: Babar Ali; Shafqat Cheema; Nayyar Ejaz; Sheharyar Cheema; Umar Cheema; Yasir Khan; Naeem Khan; Areeba Khan; Ahmad Cheema; Qaynaat Rana; Rashid Mehmood
- Cinematography: Salman Nafees
- Edited by: Jasim Khan
- Music by: Sanvel Khan
- Production companies: Cheema Films; Anwar & Sons Films
- Release date: 11 August 2017
- Country: Pakistan
- Language: Urdu

Geo Sar Utha Kay (Urdu: جیو سر اُٹھا کے) is a 2017 Pakistani action-drama film directed and produced by Nadeem Cheema under his production banner Cheema Films.

The film was written by Nasir Mehmood. Veteran actors Babar Ali, Shafqat Cheema, Nayyer Ejaz and Rashid Mehmood were cast in prominent roles. The film is based around actual events, involving the Chottu Gang of outlaws, of the 'Kacha' riverain area of Southern Punjab, Pakistan.

== Plot ==
The film is based around actual events involving the Chottu Gang of outlaws based in the 'Kacha' area of Rajanpur District in Southern Punjab. The gang has brought terror to the land and the people living there. A police team has been sent to put a stop to the gang's crimes. It would be a bloody struggle for the police.

== Cast ==
- Babar Ali as Rohail
- Shafqat Cheema as 'Kallu'
- Nayyar Ejaz as 'Chaudhary'
- Sheharyar Cheema as Sherry
- Maahi Shahi as Preeto
- Umar Cheema as Sameer
- Naeem Khan as AD
- Areeba Khan as Fiza
- Ahmad Cheema as Husnain
- Rashid Mehmood as Rulya
- Arshad Cheema as Chota Chaudary
- Mahnoor as Daku Rani

== Music ==
Music by Sanvel Khan.

== Production ==
The entire film was shot in Pakistan in Lahore, Murree, Bahawalpur, Rajanpur and Rahim Yar Khan. The film's Post Production was done in the United States.

== Release ==
The trailer for the film was released on 30 June 2016. The film was released in cinemas across Pakistan on 11 August 2017.

== See also ==
- List of Pakistani films of 2017
- Nadeem Cheema
