= Sarla Thukral =

Pioneer Indian woman pilot (1914–2008)

- सरला ठकराल
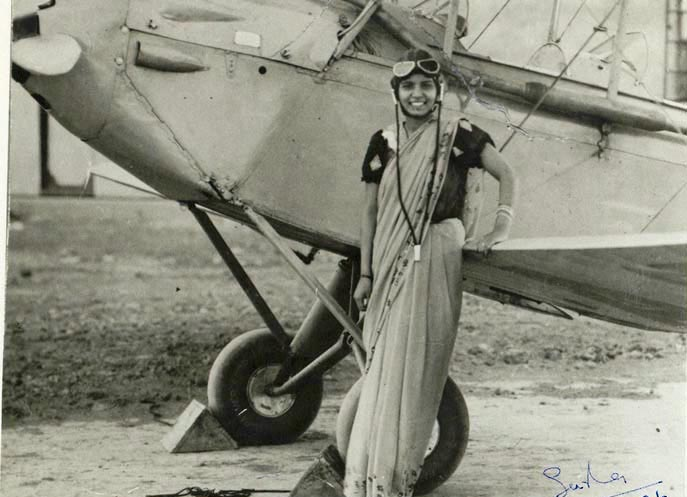
- Born: August 8, 1914; Delhi
- Died: March 15, 2008 (aged 93)
- Occupations: Businesswoman, painter and designer
- Known for: One of the first Indian women to fly aircraft
- Spouses: P. D. Sharma; R. P. Thakral
- Children: 2

Sarla Thukral (सरला ठकराल, also spelt Thakral; 8 August 1914 – 15 March 2008) was among the first Indian women to fly aircraft.

== Early life and marriage ==
Born in 1914, she earned an aviation pilot license in 1936 at the age of 21 and flew a Gypsy Moth solo. After obtaining the initial license, she persevered and completed one thousand hours of flying in the aircraft owned by the Lahore Flying Club. Her husband, P. D. Sharma, whom she married at 16 and who came from a family which had nine pilots, encouraged her.

== Aviation career ==
While her husband P. D. Sharma had been the first Indian to get his airmail pilot's license, flying between Karachi and Lahore, Sarla Thukral was among the first women in India to attain her "A" license, when she accumulated more than 1,000 hours of flying. Imtiaz Ali received an A license in June 1936, but Urmila Parikh was the first woman of Indian nationality to get a license in 1932. Sylla and Rodabeh Tata, sisters of J. R. D. Tata got licenses earlier but the Tatas were of British nationality. Sylla Petit (née Tata) was technically the first woman in British India to obtain a license, Certificate No. 11, May 1929.

Sarla Thukral's husband Sharma died in an airplane crash in 1939. After some time, Sarla tried to apply to train for her commercial pilot license, but World War II had begun and civil training was suspended. With a child to raise, and needing to earn her livelihood, Sarla abandoned her plans to become a commercial pilot, returning to Lahore and attending the Mayo School of Art where she trained in the Bengal school of painting, obtaining a diploma in fine arts.

== Personal life and death ==
Thukral was a dedicated follower of the Arya Samaj, a spiritual community dedicated to following the teachings of the Vedas. Within this community, remarriage was a possibility for Thukral. After the Partition of India, she moved to Delhi with her two daughters, where she met R. P. Thakral and married him in 1948.

Thukral, also known as Mati, became a successful businesswoman, painter and began designing clothes and costume jewellery. She died in 2008.

== In popular culture ==
On 8 August 2021, Google honoured Thukral with a Google Doodle on her birth anniversary.
