= Syed Ahmad Dehlvi =

Indian Muslim scholar (d. 1918)

Mawlānā Syed Ahmad Dehlvi
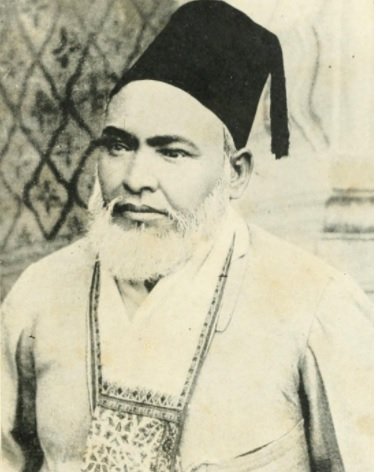
- Title: Khan Sahib

Personal life
- Born: 8 January 1846 Delhi, Mughal India
- Died: 11 May 1918 (aged 72)
- Notable work: Farhang e Asifiya

Religious life
- Religion: Islam

Syed Ahmad Dehlvi (also written as Sayyid Aḥmad Dihlawī; 8 January 1846 – 11 May 1918) was an Indian Muslim scholar, linguist, lexicographer, philologist, educationist and an author of the Urdu language. He compiled the Asifiya dictionary.

== Biography ==
Syed Ahmad Dehlvi was born on 8 January 1846 in Delhi, Mughal India. He was the son of Hafiz Abd al-Rahman Mongheri, a descendant of Abdul Qadir Jilani.

Dehlvi assisted S W Fallon in dictionary projects between 1873 and 1879. He taught at Shahi Madrasa, located in the Arab Sarai, in Delhi. He was later appointed as a teacher of Urdu and Persian in the Municipal Board High School, in Himachal Pradesh. He was a fellow and examiner at University of the Punjab and served as the vice-manager of Government Book Depot in Lahore.

In 1914, Dehlvi was honored with the title of Khan Sahib by the Government of British India. He died on 11 May 1918.

== Literary works ==
Dehlvi's works include:

- Farhang e Asifiya
- Hādi-un-Nisa
- Lughāt-un-Nisā
- ʻIlmullisān : yaʻnī, insān kī ibtidāʼī, darmiyānī aur ak̲h̲īr zabān
- Rusūm-i Dihlī
- Qiṣṣah-yi Mihr Afroz
- Munāẓirah-yi taqdīr-o-tadbīr, maʻrūf bih kunzulfavāʼid.
- Muhakama-e-Markaz-e-Urdu
- Muraqqa-e-Zuban-o-Bayan-e-Dehli

== Opinions on Urdu vocabulary ==
Syed Ahmed Dehlavi estimated in the Farhang-e-Asifiya Urdu dictionary, that 75% of Urdu words have their etymological roots in Sanskrit and Prakrit, and approximately 99% of Urdu verbs have their roots in Sanskrit and Prakrit. Urdu has borrowed words from Persian and to a lesser extent, Arabic through Persian, to the extent of about 25% to 30% of Urdu's vocabulary.

== Legacy ==
Zahrah Jafri wrote Sayyid Aḥmad Dihlavī: ḥayāt aur kārnāme (transl. Sayyid Aḥmad Dihlavī: Life and works).

== Bibliography ==
- Asir Adrawi (2 April 2016). Tazkirah Mashāhīr-e-Hind: Karwān-e-Rafta (in Urdu). Deoband: Darul Muallifeen. p. 116.
