= Kabhi Main Kabhi Tum =

2024 Pakistani television series

- Title screen
- کبھی میں کبھی تم
- Genre: Drama; Romance
- Written by: Farhat Ishtiaq
- Directed by: Badar Mehmood
- Starring: Fahad Mustafa; Hania Aamir (See full cast)
- Theme music composer: Chal Diye Tum Kahaan
- Composer: AUR
- Country of origin: Pakistan
- Original language: Urdu
- No. of seasons: 1
- No. of episodes: 34

Production
- Executive producers: Fahad Mustafa; Dr Ali Kazmi
- Producers: Fahad Mustafa; Dr. Ali Kazmi
- Production locations: Karachi, Pakistan
- Cinematography: Ghayas Uddin Siddiqui
- Camera setup: Multi-camera setup
- Running time: 37 minutes
- Production company: Big Bang Entertainment

Original release
- Network: ARY Digital
- Release: 2 July – 5 November 2024

Kabhi Main Kabhi Tum (Urdu: کبھی میں کبھی تم, lit. 'Sometimes Me, Sometimes You') is a 2024 Pakistani romantic drama television series, produced by Fahad Mustafa and Ali Kazmi under the banner of Big Bang Entertainment, and directed by Badar Mehmood. It stars Mustafa and Hania Aamir alongside Javaid Sheikh, Bushra Ansari, Emmad Irfani and Naeema Butt. The series marks the return of Fahad Mustafa to television after ten years.

The series became the highest-rated program on Pakistani television since 2021 to 2024, receiving critical acclaim for its storyline, performances, and soundtrack, becoming a huge success across Indian subcontinent.

== Plot ==
The story begins with the wedding preparations of Adeel and Sharjeena. Adeel is a topper, a hard-working and ambitious guy who believes money is everything, whereas Sharjeena, an independent and strong woman, wants a simple life with someone she can love and trust.

Things take a turn when Adeel's boss Rubaab, confesses her love to Adeel after hearing about his marriage. She has loved him since he first joined her company. Rubaab is a strong, narcissistic and hardworking woman who believes she can take anything or anyone she likes, no matter the cost or risk.

Upon hearing the news, Adeel calls off the wedding and proposes to Rubab not because he loves her but because of her wealth and status. He found an opportunity to improve his social and wealth status and so decided to marry Rubaab. Heartbroken, Sharjeena doesn't know what to do, as her sister was also getting married at the same reception, and this would harm her sister's image in front of her future in-laws. To save the dignity of both families, Adeel's younger brother, Mustafa, comes in.

Mustafa, unlike his brother, is an academic failure, dropout, and unambitious person; instead, he is into gaming, technology and practical life. He doesn't believe in planning for the future, all he wants to do is live in the present. Sharjeena asks Mustafa to marry her. At first he hesitates, but then he accepts, and they both get married.

Mustafa and Sharjeena face problems with Mustafa's mother, Shagufta, but his father, Iftekhar, and his sister, Sidra, like Sharjeena. As time passes, they grow closer and begin loving each other. Sharjeena's love changes Mustafa, and he understands his responsibility. Sharjeena tells him that he is talented and should use his talent to work in a field where he can earn well so that his family and Sharjeena's father would not taunt him. He gets a job in the gaming field.

On the other hand, Adeel faces class superiority issues from his wife, who controls him as if he were a slave for her. Her father always taunts Adeel because he is using Rubaab's wealth to enjoy a luxurious life, but Rubaab doesn't care much about this because she loves him.

Things get worse when Iftekhar suffers from a heart disease and needs surgery. But Shagufta prefers Rubaab over Sharjeena due to her wealth. Rubaab thought that Adeel still has feelings for Sharjeena, which is the reason why she came along with Adeel to keep an eye on him. Sharjeena doesn't love Adeel anymore, and her love for Mustafa makes Adeel jealous, as he is not happy with Rubaab.

Rubaab creates chaos, giving Sharjeena money for food only to insult her, her sister and her husband, thus getting into a fight with Sharjeena.

One day, Rubaab creates a hoax to drag Mustafa and Sharjeena. Everyone blames Mustafa and asks him to leave if he doesn't apologise to Rubaab for something he didn't do. Enraged, Mustafa and Sharjeena leave the house. They move into a rented house, working hard all day to meet the basic necessities. Mustafa has an idea to develop a game. He pitches the idea to his boss Joseph only to get cheated by him. Mustafa is discovered by another developer Danish who offers him a partnership in his company which he named DANMUSA (Danish and Mustafa). Mustafa gets really focused on his job. He wants to earn so much that no one could raise a finger on Sharjeena and they both are able to live a peaceful life. But Sharjeena wanted Mustafa to live a normal life and be who he is but he has changed a lot which causes problems between them. More problems arise when Sharjeena tells Mustafa that she is pregnant. They both want the child, but Mustafa's working behaviour haunts Sharjeena, causing her to think that he doesn't want the baby, but Mustafa was only doing this for her and the baby.

On the other hand, it is discovered that Adeel was committing fraud in his company by telling their strategies and information to rival companies to get commission. He gets threatened by a custom agent who wanted money at any cost. So, Adeel sells his fathers house and takes everyone to Rubab's house which his father doesn't like. He is also cheating on his wife with her best friend, Natasha and soon Rubaab finds out. She exposes Adeel in front of everyone about his fraudulent behaviour and affair. She gets him arrested, thus Adeel is ruined.

Mustafa becomes a successful game developer. He returns home and finds Sharjeena laying on floor quickly takes her to the hospital where they find out that she has miscarried. Heartbroken, Sharjeena leaves Mustafa and moves in with her family. Mustafa who was once a nobody has everything now but has lost his precious, Sharjeena. Upon hearing his families condition, Mustafa brings his parents into his house as Rubaab threw both of them out. Both parents apologise to Mustafa for everything they did to him and Sharjeena but Sharjeena wasn't ready to return. Mustafa gets Adeel bailed out of jail but cuts ties with him and also buys back his father's house.

Mustafa meets with Sharjeena who wants the old Mustafa back, the one she fell in love with. But he has changed and wants her to accept him as he is. They both go to their rented house, they hug each other and reconcile. The story ends with the title 'Kabhi Main Kabhi Tum'.

== Cast ==
- Fahad Mustafa as Mustafa Ahmed: Iftikhar & Shagufta's younger son; Adeel & Sidra's brother; Sharjeena's husband.
- Hania Aamir as Sharjeena Murtaza: Murtaza & Salma's eldest daughter; Yumna & Rameen's sister; Adeel's ex fiancée; Mustafa's wife.
- Emmad Irfani as Adeel Ahmed: Iftikhar & Shagufta's elder son; Sidra & Mustafa's brother; Sharjeena's ex fiancé; Rubab's husband.
- Naeema Butt as Rubab Mansoor Khan: Mansoor's daughter; Adeel's wife
- Jawed Sheikh as Iftikhar Ahmed: Shagufta's husband; Adeel, Sidra & Mustafa's father.
- Bushra Ansari as Shagufta Ahmed: Iftikhar's wife; Adeel, Sidra & Mustafa's mother.
- Maya Khan as Sidra Waqas / Sidra Ahmed: Iftikhar & Shagufta's daughter; Adeel & Mustafa's sister; Waqas's wife; Hamza's mother.
- Tauseeq Haider as Murtaza: Salma's husband; Sharjeena, Yumna & Rameen's father.
- Annie Zaidi as Salma Murtaza: Murtaza's wife; Sharjeena, Yumna & Rameen's mother.
- Zainab Mazhar as Yumna Bilal / Yumna Murtaza: Murtaza & Salma's second daughter; Sharjeena & Rameen's sister; Bilal's wife
- Hania Ahmed as Rameen Murtaza: Murtaza & Salma's youngest daughter; Sharjeena & Yumna's sister.
- Afnaan Banday as Bilal: Yumna's husband.
- Yousuf Bashir Qureshi as Mansoor Ali Khan: Rubab's father
- Faham Usman as Salman: Natasha's ex-husband.
- Areej Chaudhary as Natasha Salman: Salman's ex-wife; Rubab and Sarfaraz's childhood best friend.
- Sheraz Sikandar as Sarfaraz: Rubab and Natasha's childhood best friend.

== Casting ==
Before Fahad Mustafa was cast as Mustafa, the role was reportedly offered to Bilal Abbas Khan. According to reports and discussions surrounding the production, Abbas initially accepted the role but later departed from the project for reasons that were not publicly disclosed. Fahad Mustafa subsequently joined the drama as Mustafa, marking his return to television after a lengthy absence. The circumstances surrounding Bilal Abbas Khan reported departure have not been officially clarified by the actor or the production team. Consequently, the exact reason for the change in casting remains unconfirmed.

== Reception ==
The series received positive feedback from fans and critics, and the chemistry between Mustafa and Aamir was particularly praised along with the poignant storytelling and direction. It was praised for its realistic portrayal of Karachi, the woes of the middle-class of the country and an acute depiction of the relationship dynamics in families. The series consistently garnered high TRPs throughout its run, with the finale getting a TRP of 24.2 - highest in Pakistan since 2021. Owing to the popularity of the series, the final episode was screened in movie theaters across Pakistan with sold out shows.

== Music ==
The drama series featured multiple original soundtracks for different stages of the story.

#	Song	Singer	Notes
01.	Main Haar Giyan	Naseebo Lal, Hassan Ali Hashmi	
02.	Uri Uri	Hassan Ali Hashmi	
03.	Main Haar Giyan (Female)	Naseebo Lal	
04.	Oye Loser	Sherry Khattak	Instrumental
05.	Sajna Da Dil Torya	Zeeshan Ali	
06.	Chal Diye Tum Kahan	AUR	

== Controversy ==
Safdar Ali Soomro, an artist from Ghotki, filed a notice against the creators of a series after discovering that his lost paintings were featured in the show. He had submitted these works to the Frere Hall gallery in 2017, along with pieces from other artists, but they went missing. Soomro has also filed a lawsuit against Frere Hall and the makers had supported an investigation by the government on Frere Hall.

== Accolades ==
Year	Ceremony	Category	Recipient	Result	Ref.
2025	24th Lux Style Awards	Actor of the Year - Female (Viewers’ choice)	Hania Aamir	Won	
2025	24th Lux Style Awards	Actor of the Year - Male (Viewers’ choice)	Fahad Mustafa	Won	
2025	24th Lux Style Awards	Best Original Soundtrack (Viewers’ choice)	Chal Diye Tum Kaha Pe	Nominated	
2025	24th Lux Style Awards	Best Original Soundtrack (Viewers’ choice)	Sajna Da Dil Torya	Nominated	
2025	24th Lux Style Awards	Play of the Year (Viewers’ choice	Kabhi Main Kabhi Tum	Won	
2025	24th Lux Style Awards	Best Ensemble Play (Critics’ choice)	Kabhi Main Kabhi Tum	Nominated	
2025	24th Lux Style Awards	TV Director of the Year (Critics’ choice)	Badar Mehmood	Nominated	
2025	24th Lux Style Awards	TV Play Writer of the Year (Critics’ choice)	Farhat Ishtiaq	Nominated	
2025	2nd Kya Drama Hai Icon Awards	Best Writer (Critics’ Choice)	Farhat Ishtiaq	Nominated	
2025	2nd Kya Drama Hai Icon Awards	Best Writer (Popular Choice)	Farhat Ishtiaq	Won	
2025	Pakistan International Screen Awards	Best Writer	Farhat Ishtiaq	Pending	
2025	Pakistan International Screen Awards	Best TV Serial	Kabhi Main Kabhi Tum	Pending	
2025	Pakistan International Screen Awards	Best Actor - TV (Popular)	Fahad Mustafa	Pending	
2025	Pakistan International Screen Awards	Best Actor - TV (Critic’s Choice)	Fahad Mustafa	Pending	
2025	Pakistan International Screen Awards	Best Actress - TV (Popular)	Hania Aamir	Pending	
2025	Pakistan International Screen Awards	Best Onscreen Couple	Fahad Mustafa and Hania Aamir	Pending	
2025	Pakistan International Screen Awards	Best Actor/Actress in a Negative Role	Naeema Butt	Pending	
2025	Pakistan International Screen Awards	Best Original Soundtrack	Chal Diye Tum Kaha Pe	Pending	
2025	Pakistan International Screen Awards	Best Director	Badar Mehmood	Pending	

== See also ==
- List of programs broadcast by ARY Digital
- Eta Amaderi Golpo, Bangladeshi adaptation
