= Muhammadi Begum =

Indian writer (1878–1908)

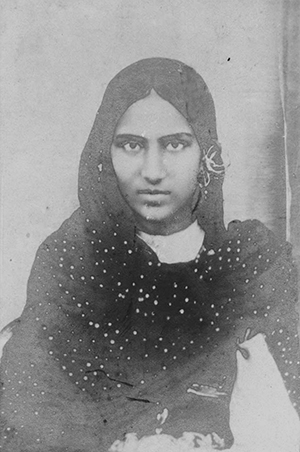

Personal life
- Born: 22 May 1878 Delhi, British India
- Died: 2 November 1908 (aged 30) Shimla, British India
- Spouse: Sayyid Mumtaz Ali
- Children: Imtiaz Ali Taj (son)
- Notable work(s): Tehzeeb-e-Niswan
- Relatives: Yasmeen Tahir (granddaughter); Naeem Tahir (grandson); Faran Tahir (great-grandson); Ali Tahir (great-grandson)

Religious life
- Religion: Islam
- Denomination: Sunni Islam

Muhammadi Begum (also known as Sayyidah Muhammadi Begum; 22 May 1878 – 2 November 1908) was an Indian Sunni Muslim scholar, Urdu writer and an advocate of women education. She co-founded the Islamic weekly magazine Tehzeeb-e-Niswan, and was its founding editor. She is known as the first woman who edited an Urdu magazine. She was the wife of Sayyid Mumtaz Ali Deobandi.

== Biography ==
Muhammadi Begum was born on 22 May 1878 in Shahpur in Delhi. She learned Urdu and she became a Hafiz as she memorized the Quran. She learned to write letters to remain in touch with her elder sister after she got married in 1886.

In 1897, she became the second wife of Sayyid Mumtaz Ali Deobandi, an Islamic scholar and an alumnus of Darul Uloom Deoband. She learned Arabic and Persian from her new husband and was privately educated in English, Hindi and mathematics.

On 1 July 1898, the couple started a weekly magazine for women called Tehzeeb-e-Niswan, which is regarded as one of the pioneering works on women rights in Islam. The magazine published radical ideas about divorce with enforced alimony and to end purdah and polygamy as it existed. She has been considered as India's first Muslim feminist woman and the first woman who ever edited an Urdu magazine. She edited Tehzeeb-e-Niswan until her death in 1908.

== Literary works ==
Muhammadi Begum authored thirty books which included Shareef Beti, which dealt with the hazards of arranged marriages of children which often lead to enforced marriages. Her other works include:

- Aaj Kal
- Safia Begum
- Chandan Haar
- Aadab-e-Mulaqaat
- Rafeeqe Aroos
- Khaanadari
- Sughhar Beti

== Death and legacy ==
Aged 30, Muhammadi Begum died at Shimla on 2 November 1908. Her grandson Naeem Tahir compiled a biography Sayyidah Muhammadi Begum awr Unka Khandan (transl. Sayyidah Muhammadi Begum and her family). Her son was Imtiaz Ali Taj who was born in 1900. She nicknamed him "Mera Taj" (My crown) and in time he would become a leading playwright and adopt her pet name for him, "Taj", as part of his own name. Her daughter, Waheeda Begum, became the editor of her magazine after she died and after a few years Imtiaz Ali Taj took over.
