= Farhang-e-Asifiya =

Urdu dictionary

Farhaṅg-i Āṣafiyya
- Book cover
- Editor: Syed Ahmad Dehlvi
- Original title: فَرْہَن٘گِ آصَفِیَّہ
- Language: Urdu
- Genre: Dictionary
- Publisher: Rifah-e-Aam Press (Lahore)
- Publication date: January 1901 (1st edition)
- Publication place: British India
- Media type: Print
- Website: archive.org/details/FarhangAsifiya

Farhang-e-Asifiya (Urdu: فرہنگ آصفیہ, lit. 'The Dictionary of Asif') is an Urdu-to-Urdu dictionary compiled by Syed Ahmad Dehlvi. It has more than 60,000 entries in four volumes. It was first published in January 1901 by the Rifah-e-Aam Press in Lahore.

== History ==
It was compiled from 1868 to 1898. This dictionary is believed to be the most comprehensive work of Urdu lexicon.

== Lexicography ==
There were Urdu dictionaries before this, but they described Urdu vocables either in Persian or in English (because of the emergence of British Raj). These dictionaries contained mostly common words and idioms and had limited extent. This was the first Urdu-to-Urdu dictionary. During its compilation, Syed Dehlvi’s health worsened and he got into monetary issues. It was only completed with the support of the ruler of Nizam of Hyderabad, Mahbub Ali Khan, Asaf Jah VI, after whom the dictionary was named.
