= Naeema Butt =

Pakistani actress

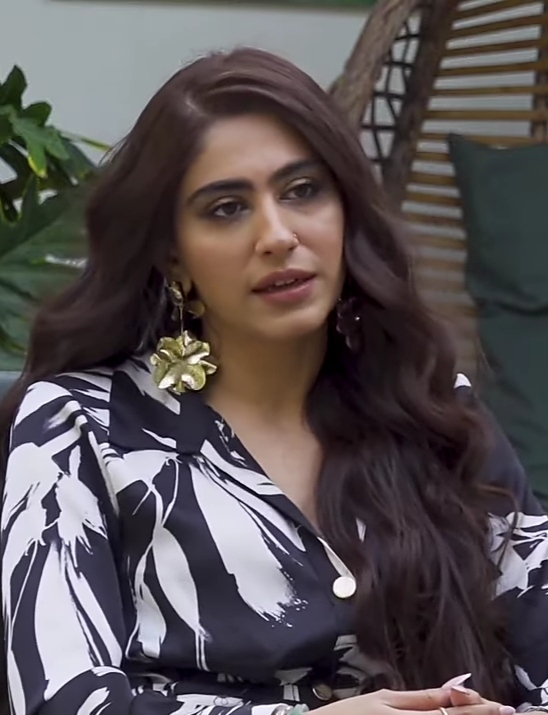
- Butt in 2023
- Born: 11 July 1990 (age 35); Lahore, Pakistan
- Occupation: Actress
- Years active: 2019–present

Naeema Butt (born 11 July 1990) is a Pakistani actress who mainly works in Urdu television dramas. She is known for playing Ghazala Habib in Ehd-e-Wafa, Rubab Mansoor Khan in Kabhi Main Kabhi Tum, and Irma in Daasi, which earned her recognition in the television industry.

== Filmography ==
=== Films ===
Year	Title	Role	Director	Notes	Ref(s)
2026	Bullah	Fakeera	Shoaib Khan	Film Debut	

=== Television ===
Year	Title	Role	Channel	Notes	Ref(s)
2019	Bhook	Unknown	Hum TV	Debut	
2019	Ehd-e-Wafa	Ghazala Habib	Hum TV		
2019	Daasi	Irma	Hum TV		
2019	Main Khwab Bunti Hoon	Areen	Hum TV		
2022	Fraud	Tooba Shujaat Atray	ARY Digital		
2023	Jindo	Shano	Green Entertainment		
2024	Inspector Sabiha	Nadia	Express Entertainment		
2024	Kabhi Main Kabhi Tum	Rubab Mansoor Khan	ARY Digital		

=== Telefilms ===
Year	Title	Role	Channel	Notes	Ref(s)
2026	Pyaar Ka Punch	Rania	Green Entertainment		

=== Web Series ===
Year	Title	Role	Ref(s)
2020	Weham	Nazia	

== Awards and nominations ==
Year	Award	Category	Work	Result	Ref(s)
2025	24th Lux Style Awards	Best Emerging Talent of the Year – Drama	Inspector Sabiha	Nominated	
2026	3rd Pakistan International Screen Awards	Best Actress in a Negative Role	Kabhi Main Kabhi Tum	Nominated	
