= Zulfiqar Ali Atre =

Pakistani singer (1954 – 2025)

Zulfiqar Ali Atray
- Born: 1954; Lahore, West Pakistan, Pakistan
- Died: 17 January 2025 (aged 71); Lahore, Punjab, Pakistan
- Other names: Zulfiqar Ali (During his career, he was mostly credited as Zulfiqar Ali in films)
- Occupations: Film score composer Musician; Classical music singer
- Awards: Pride of Performance award by the President of Pakistan in 2024 * Won 4 Nigar Awards during his career

Zulfiqar Ali Atre, Zulfiqar Ali Atray, Zulfiqar Ali (1954 – 17 January 2025) was a Pakistani musician. As a film score composer, he composed songs for more than 250 Pakistani films, many of them in Punjabi language.

He also composed music for many Urdu language ghazals and films in Pakistan.

== Early life and career ==
Zulfiqar was born in 1954 in Lahore, Pakistan. Zulfiqar Ali Atre was a nephew and student of the famous Pakistani film score composer Rasheed Atre (1919 – 1967).

== Filmography ==
All films listed below are in Punjabi language:

- Wohti Da Sawal Ae (1982)
- Moti Tay Dogar (1983)
- Dilan De Sauday (1983)
- Bau Jee (1983)
- Basheera In Trouble (1988)
- Kalka (1989 film)
- Lahori Badshah (1991 film)
- Cobra (1991 film)
- Badmash Thug (1991)
- Choorian (1998 film)
- Nikki Jaee Haan (1999 film)
- Mehndi Waley Hath (2000 film)
- Majajan (2006 film)
- Zill-e-Shah (2008 film)

=== Ghazals composed by him ===
- Niyyat-e-Shauq Bhar Nah Jaey Kahin, Sung by Noor Jehan, lyrics by the poet Nasir Kazmi
- Suna Hai Loag Ussay Ankh Bhar Kay Dekhtay Hain, Sung by Noor Jehan, lyrics by the poet Ahmad Faraz

== Awards and recognition ==
- Pride of Performance award by the President of Pakistan in 2024.
- Won 4 Nigar Awards for films Choorian (1998 film), Nikki Jaee Haan (1999 film), Mehndi Waley Hath (2000 film) and Majajan (2006 film).

== Death ==
Zulfiqar Ali Atre died from a severe heart attack in Lahore, on 17 January 2025, at the age of 71. According to his son, he had developed a chest infection and was having difficulty breathing. He was taken to Punjab Institute of Cardiology in Lahore for treatment where doctors gave him an injection and he seemed to be in stable condition. So he was sent home. At night, his condition suddenly deteriorated and he was rushed to a private hospital in Allama Iqbal Town, Lahore where doctors pronounced him dead.

Among the survivors are his widow, five daughters and two sons. Lahore Arts Council and Punjab Institute of Language, Art and Culture (PILAC) have condoled his loss.
