= Moti Tay Dogar =

1983 film

- Directed by: Jahangir Qaisar
- Written by: Mirza Adeeb & Shahid Adeeb
- Screenplay by: Mirza Adeeb; Shahid Adeeb
- Produced by: Shahid Mir; Aziz Khan
- Starring: Mustafa Qureshi; Sultan Rahi; Mumtaz; Zamurrad; Nazli; Mazhar Shah; Bahar; Sawan; Sheikh Iqbal; Adeeb; Altaf Khan; M. Ajmal
- Cinematography: Irshad Bhatti
- Edited by: Hamayun; Hamid Rahi
- Music by: Zulfiqar Ali Atre
- Production company: Evernew Studios
- Distributed by: Mir Films
- Release date: July 11, 1983 (Pakistan)
- Running time: 170 minutes
- Country: Pakistan
- Language: Punjabi

Moti Tay Dogar (Punjabi: موتی تے ڈوگر) is a 1983 Pakistani Punjabi language action film.

Directed by Jahangir Qaisar and produced by Shahid Mir, the film starred Mustafa Qureshi, Sultan Rahi, Mumtaz and Adeeb.

== Cast ==
- Mustafa Qureshi - (Moti Dogar)
- Sultan Rahi
- Mumtaz
- Zumurrud
- Nazli
- Mazhar Shah
- Sawan
- Sheikh Iqbal
- M. Ajmal
- Afzal Khan
- Adeeb
- Bahar - (Malika-E- Jazbat)

== Track list ==
The music of the film is by musician Zulfiqar Ali Atre. The lyrics are penned by Saeed Gillani and singers are Noor Jehan, Shaukat Ali.

| # | Title | Singer(s) |
|---|---|---|
| 1 | "Shadi Kar Kay Sanu Bhul Na Janvin" | Shaukat Ali |
| 2 | "Akh Laday Ee Laday" | Noor Jehan |
| 3 | "Main Pyar Tere Naal" | Noor Jehan |
| 4 | "Rung Khushian De Nal" | Noor Jahan |
