= Ali Tahir =

Pakistani actor, writer and director

Syed Ali Tahir
- Born: 11 August 1970 (age 56); Lahore, Punjab, Pakistan
- Occupations: Actor; Director; Producer
- Years active: 1995–present
- Spouse: Wajeeha Tahir
- Parent(s): Naeem Tahir (father); Yasmeen Tahir (mother)
- Relatives: Imtiaz Ali Taj (maternal grandfather); Hijab Imtiaz Ali (maternal grandmother); Sayyid Mumtaz Ali (maternal great-grandfather); Muhammadi Begum (maternal great-grandmother); Faran Tahir (brother)

Ali Tahir (Urdu: علی طاہر) is a Pakistani actor, director, producer and educationist.

Ali is best known for his role in the 1995 sitcom Teen Bata Teen and more recently as character actor in different other dramas.

== Personal life ==
=== Family background ===
Ali belongs to a family involved in both Urdu literature and the media industry: his father Naeem Tahir is an actor and writer; his mother, Yasmeen Tahir, was one of the earliest female voices of Radio Pakistan; his grandparents Imtiaz Ali Taj and Hijab Imtiaz Ali were both well-known writers, Hijab also being the first Muslim female pilot; his brother Faran Tahir is an actor as well while another brother, Mehran Tahir, is a television producer.

=== Relationships ===
Ali is married to Wajeeha Tahir, who is also an actress and was a cast member of Teen Bata Teen.

== Career ==
Having begun as an actor in the 1990s with PTV, after acting for many years he turned to direction and production, his first project being Taj Classics, a set of episodes based on the works of his grandfather Imtiaz Ali Taj.

== Other work ==
=== Academia ===
Ali has been teaching media arts at the Beaconhouse National University as well at the Punjab University.

== Filmography ==
=== Film ===
Year	Title	Role	Note
2013	Chambaili		

=== Television serials ===
Key
†	Denotes films/dramas that are not released/aired

Year	Title	Role	Channel	Director	Producer	Notes
1995	Teen Bata Teen	Johnny	PTV			
1996	Ranjish	Salman	PTV			
2001	Kaun: The Search for Truth	Fareed Shah	STN			Crime-mystery series
2006	Gharoor	Aulia	PTV			
2012	Samjhota Express	Sajjad Mubeen	PTV	Yes	Yes	
2013	Mohabat Subh Ka Sitara Hai	Waleed	Hum TV			
2013	Taar-e-Ankaboot	Baqir	Geo Entertainment			
2014	Do Saal Ki Aurat	Shehzad	Hum TV			
2016	Pashemaan	Bilal	Express TV			
2017	Mohini Mansion Ki Cinderellayain	No	Bol Entertainment	Yes		
2017	Sangsar	Fayyaz	Hum TV			
2017	Iltija	Saqib	ARY Digital			
2017	Mujhay Jeenay Do	Muraad	Urdu 1			
2019	Inkaar	Azam Iqbal	Hum TV			
2021	Phaans	Siraj	Hum TV			
2021	Hum Kahan Ke Sachay Thay	Tahir	Hum TV			
2022	Qalandar	Ehsaan	Geo Entertainment			
2023	Kuch Ankahi	Salman's client	ARY Digital			Cameo (episode 15)
2023	Jaisay Aapki Marzi	Ehtasham	ARY Digital			
2023	Muhabbat Gumshuda Meri	Sarmad	Hum TV			
2023	Rah-e-Junoon	Azhar Kareem	Hum TV			
2024	Mehroom	Zaffar	Geo Entertainment			
2024	Zard Patton Ka Bunn	Afzal "Fazlu" Khan	Hum TV			
2025	Shirin Farhad	Sultan	Hum TV			
2025	Raaja Rani	Shahid	Hum TV			
2025	Sher	Badar	ARY Digital			
2025	Sanwal Yaar Piya	Aslam	Geo Entertainment			
2026	Hurmat	Akram	Hum TV			
2026	Rutba	Maulvi	ARY Digital			
