= Kanwal Nauman =

Pakistani actress-turned-politician (1964)

Member of the Provincial Assembly of the Punjab
- In office 29 May 2013 – 22 May 2018
- Constituency: Reserved seat for women

Personal details
- Born: Tasneem Begum; 1 January 1964 (age 62) Multan, Pakistan
- Party: Pakistan Muslim League (N)
- Spouse: Syed Nauman Aziz
- Children: 1
- Education: Lahore College for Women University
- Occupation: Actress; Politician; Human Rights Activist

Kanwal Nauman is a Pakistani actress-turned-politician who was a Member of the Provincial Assembly of the Punjab from May 2013 to May 2018.

== Early life and education ==
She was born on 1 January 1964 in Multan.

She completed high school level education from Women Degree College, Multan in 1983.

== Career ==
=== Acting career ===
She was cast in a supporting role in the 1982 Urdu film Bara Bhai which was a Silver Jubilee hit. She later started working in Pakistan Television (PTV) dramas in 1986. Kanwal made her debut in PTV drama Aik Din as Jatti, a milkmaid. The play was written by Munnu Bhai and directed by Iftikhar Thakur. She continued working in TV dramas in the mid-1980s and the 1990s, including super-hit drama Shab Daig. She worked almost for twenty years and has achieved prestigious awards. In 1993, she won Nigar Award for Best Supporting Actress in film Qasam. She also runs a production media house, which produces programmes for public awareness. Then she took a break from acting and then she returned after a gap of eight years and she performed in a Eid special play Dada Ka Pota.

=== Political career ===
She joined politics in 2008.

She was elected to the Provincial Assembly of the Punjab as a candidate of Pakistan Muslim League (N) (PML-N) on a reserved seat for women in the 2013 general election. In May 2018, she resigned from the Provincial Assembly of the Punjab.

=== Activist career ===
She runs an NGO working for poverty alleviation, eradication of drug addiction, highlighting women and special persons related issues and promoting importance of education and health facilities. She is a Member of Standing Committee on Special Education and Standing Committee on Home Affairs.

== Personal life ==
Kanwal is married to Colonel Syed Nauman Aziz and has a son named Ahmed Nauman.

== Death hoax ==
On 1 February 2016, Nauman was erroneously reported dead. At the time, Nauman was in a critical condition and was in intensive care recovering from brain hemorrhage. On 5 April 2016, she returned to the Provincial Assembly of the Punjab after 65 days of absence.

== Filmography ==
=== Television ===
Year	Title	Role	Network
1986	Aik Din	Jatti	PTV
1987	Dhund Ke Uss Par	Atiqa	PTV
1988	Lab-e-Sahil	Sajida	PTV
1989	Pyas	Zareena	PTV
1989	Neelay Hath	Amna	PTV
1990	Shab Daig	Rosheen	PTV
1991	Khoji	Shareefa	PTV
1993	Mohallay Daar	Noori	PTV
1994	Premeshier Singh	Banto	PTV
1995	Red Card	Zahra Bai	PTV
1996	Sona Mila Na Pee Milay	Begum Bhutta	PTV
1996	Hip Hip Hurray Season 2	Herself	STN
1998	Ghulam Gardish	Sharman	PTV
1999	Ghareeb-e-Shehar	Shah Bano	PTV
2001	Muskarahat	Sarwat	PTV
2004	Saray Gamay	Begum Ali	PTV
2007	Jag Beeti	Saniya	PTV
2008	Sill	Zara	ATV

=== Telefilm ===
Year	Title	Role
2016	Dada Ka Pota	Begum Sahiba

=== Film ===
Year	Film	Language
1982	Bara Bhai	Urdu
1987	Chann Mahi	Punjabi
1989	Nagin Jogi	Punjabi / Urdu
1989	Kalka	Punjabi
1989	Changeza	Punjabi
1990	Leader	Urdu
1990	Insaniyat Kay Dushman	Urdu
1991	Sher Afgan	Punjabi
1991	Pyar Hi Pyar	Urdu / Punjabi
1992	Akhara	Urdu / Punjabi
1992	Chahat	Punjabi / Urdu
1993	Qasam	Urdu
1996	Ishq Deewana	Urdu
1999	Virasat	Urdu
2001	Martay Dam Tak	Urdu
2006	Pehla Pehla Pyar	Urdu

== Awards and recognition ==
Year	Award	Category	Result	Title	Ref.
1993	Nigar Award	Best Supporting Actress	Won	Qasam	
1996	STN Awards	Best New Talent	Won	Hip Hip Hurray Season 2	
