= Tehzeeb-e-Niswan =

Women rights journal

- Cover image of 2 January 1943 issue of Tehzeeb-e-Niswan
- Former editors: Muhammadi Begum; Waheeda Begum; Imtiaz Ali Taj; Abdul Majeed Salik; Ahmad Nadeem Qasmi
- Categories: Women Magazine
- Frequency: Weekly
- Publisher: Sayyid Mumtaz Ali
- Founder: Sayyid Mumtaz Ali; Muhammadi Begum
- First issue: 1 July 1898
- Final issue: 1949
- Company: Darul Isha'at, Lahore
- Country: British India (1898-1947); Pakistan (1947-1949)
- Based in: Lahore
- Language: Urdu

Tehzeeb-e-Niswan (Urdu: تہذیبِ نسواں) was an Islamic weekly magazine for women, started by Sayyid Mumtaz Ali along with his wife Muhammadi Begum in 1898. It is regarded as the pioneering work on women rights in Islam. It was published from Lahore between 1898 and 1949.

== History ==
Named Tehzeeb-e-Niswan by Syed Ahmad Khan, this women rights magazine was started by Sayyid Mumtaz Ali along with his wife Muhammadi Begum in 1898. Its first issue was published on 1 July 1898. It started with eight pages and subsequently expanded to 10 pages, and finally 16 pages.

Mumtaz Ali's wife was the first editor of Tehzeeb-e-Niswan and after her death, Mumtaz Ali's daughter Waheeda Begum edited the magazine. It was later edited by Mumtaz Ali's son Imtiaz Ali Taj, and scholarly figures including Abdul Majeed Salik and Ahmad Nadeem Qasmi.

The magazine helped many female writers gain prominence. In her research work titled Feminism in Modern Urdu Poetesses, Ambreen Salahuddin wrote that "from the very first issue a large number of women started writing for this magazine nearly all of them wrote reformative articles against dowry superstitions or extravagance etc."

According to Gail Minault, Tehzeeb-e-Niswan had 60 or 70 subscribers after three or four months, and after four years it had 300 or 400 subscribers. The magazine discontinued in 1949.

== Legacy ==
Commending Mumtaz Ali for Tehzeeb-e-Niswan, Pakistani historian Ghulam Rasool Mehr said that,

The girls of Muslim families, from Peshawar to Kanyakumari who have a bit of understanding about reading and writing or have gained higher education or are studying, are undoubtedly indebted to Shams al-Ulama Mawlāna Mumtaz Ali, who sacrificed his whole life for the betterment and education of women. If he have had tried in political or religious sphere, he would have been a great leader of the country, but it would have delayed or deferred education and upbringing of the half of the Nation, because there is no second to Mawlāna in this field."
