= Bullah =

2026 Pakistani Punjabi-language action film

- Theatrical release poster
- بُلّھا
- Directed by: Shoaib Khan
- Written by: Nasir Adeeb
- Produced by: Shakeel Khan
- Starring: Shaan Shahid; Sara Loren; Saleem Sheikh; Naeema Butt; Adnan Butt; Ali Josh; Maham Mirza
- Production company: Shake Films
- Distributed by: HKC Entertainment
- Release date: 21 March 2026 (Pakistan)
- Country: Pakistan
- Language: Punjabi
- Box office: Rs. 17.84 crore (US$640,000)

Bullah (Urdu: بُلّھا) is a 2026 Pakistani Punjabi-language action film directed by Shoaib Khan and written by Nasir Adeeb. Produced by Shake Films and distributed by HKC Entertainment, the film stars Shaan Shahid in the title role, alongside Sara Loren, Saleem Sheikh, Naeema Butt, Adnan Butt, Ali Josh and Maham Mirza.

The film was released in Pakistan during Eid al-Fitr 2026. It received mixed reviews from critics, with praise for some performances, songs and technical elements, while criticism was directed at its screenplay, characterisation and reliance on older Lollywood action conventions.

== Plot ==
Bullah follows its title character, a man who confronts organised crime and injustice across Punjab. Guided by the philosophical teachings associated with his father, Bullah rescues people targeted by violent gangs and becomes involved in a conflict with criminal networks led by Faqeera, Bakshi and Shahu.

Sophia, an undercover operative and Bullah's romantic interest, joins him as he takes on Bakshi and Shahu while protecting displaced and vulnerable people. The film presents Bullah as a modern action hero whose struggle is framed around resistance, faith, dignity and social justice.

== Cast ==
- Shaan Shahid as Bullah
- Sara Loren as Sophia
- Saleem Sheikh as Bakshi
- Naeema Butt as Faqeera
- Adnan Butt as Shahu
- Ali Josh
- Maham Mirza
- Asif Khan

== Production ==
Bullah was directed by Shoaib Khan and written by Nasir Adeeb. Pre-release coverage described the film as a contemporary Punjabi action story rooted in Punjab's culture and spiritual traditions. The film was promoted as being inspired by themes associated with the Sufi poet Bulleh Shah, including resistance to injustice and oppression.

The project marked Shaan Shahid's return to Punjabi cinema after a long interval. It also reunited Shahid and Saleem Sheikh on screen nearly three decades after their previous appearance together.

== Release ==
Bullah was released in Pakistani cinemas during Eid al-Fitr 2026, alongside other local releases including Aag Lagay Basti Mein and Delhi Gate.

== Reception ==
=== Box office ===
The film grossed Rs. 17.84 crore worldwide, including collections from Pakistan, the GCC, North America, Canada and the United Kingdom. The report also stated that the film had helped revive business for single-screen cinemas in Punjab.

=== Critical response ===
Writing for Youlin Magazine, Muhammad Suhayb described Bullah as ambitious but inconsistent. He wrote that the film attempted to combine stylised action with philosophical themes inspired by Bulleh Shah, but criticised its overcrowded narrative, weak characterisation and underdeveloped subplots. Suhayb praised the action choreography by Azam Bhatti and said the songs contributed to the film's appeal. Writing for Social Diary, Maham Shahid highlighted the film's shift from high initial potential to structural failure, noting that despite an intriguing premise inspired by Sufi cultural motifs, the movie ultimately stumbled due to weak screenwriting and inconsistent pacing. The critic observed that while the lead performances showed occasional promise, flawed direction and underdeveloped character arcs prevented the narrative from achieving emotional resonance or commercial cohesion.

== See also ==
- List of Pakistani films of 2026
- List of Pakistani Punjabi-language films
