= Ghost School =

Pakistani film

- Directed by: Seemab Gul
- Written by: Seemab Gul
- Produced by: Seemab Gul; Steffen Gerdes; Dorothe Beinemeier
- Starring: Nazualiya Arsalan
- Cinematography: Zamarin Wahdat
- Edited by: Raluca Petre; Alexandra Strauss
- Music by: Anna Bauer
- Production companies: Cinelava; Red Balloon Film
- Release dates: 8 September 2025 (TIFF); 30 October 2026 (Pakistan)
- Running time: 88 minutes
- Countries: Pakistan; Saudi Arabia; Germany
- Language: Urdu

Ghost School is a 2026 fantasy drama film directed, produced, and written by Seemab Gul in her directorial debut. It stars Nazualiya Arsalan as Rabia, a ten-year-old girl who tries to uncover the reason why her school is closed. It had its world premiere at the Toronto International Film Festival on 8 September 2025 and received a nationwide theatrical release on 30 October 2026.

== Plot ==
In a rural village, ten-year-old Rabia searches for the reason her school, the only one in the village, has been closed. As rumors of supernatural forces spread through her community, she becomes determined to uncover the truth behind the closure.

== Cast ==
- Nazualiya Arsalan as Rabia
- Samina Seher as Rabia's mother
- Adnan Shah Tipu
- Vajdaan Shah
- Muhammad Zamaan
- Muhammad Zayan
- Kehan Naqvi
- Taha Khan
- Ziarat Gul
- Tariq Raja
- Tutu Baba

== Production ==
Gul began developing a feature film project titled Haven of Hope. While working on it, she decided to self-fund another project which eventually became Ghost School. The project received a €25,000 completion grant from the MOIN Film Fund. It also received a post-production grant from the Red Sea Fund.

In an interview with Variety, Gul revealed that the film was inspired by her travel to Pakistan in 2022, where she encountered many "ghost schools" in Sindh and Balochistan. The term refers to abandoned school buildings that were originally intended to function as schools but are no longer in use, often due to neglect or corruption. She further explained to The Indian Express that she wanted to highlight the issues surrounding female education in the country. She aimed to "develop a script that examines the cracks in the education system".

Principal photography took place in Karachi in November 2024.

== Release ==
Ghost School had its world premiere at the 2025 Toronto International Film Festival at the Discovery section on 8 September 2025. Prior to its premiere, French-based MPM Premium acquired the film's international sales rights. It also screened at the Red Sea International Film Festival at the Families & Children section in December 2025. The film had its European premiere at the 76th Berlin International Film Festival on 16 February 2026, in the section "Generation Kplus".

Ghost School also screened at a wide range of international festivals, including the Indian Film Festival of Los Angeles, Seoul International Women's Film Festival, Muslim International Film Festival, Austin Asian American Film Festival, Flying Broom International Women's Film Festival, Zlín Film Festival, UK Asian Film Festival, San Francisco International Film Festival, Stockholm International Film Festival Junior, FESCAAAL, Luxembourg City Film Festival, New York International Children's Film Festival, Glasgow Film Festival, and the Women International Film Festival.

Ghost School was released in cinemas across Pakistan, including Sindh, on 30 October 2026, following an initial denial of its censor certificate in the province and subsequent orders for the Sindh Censor Board to reconsider the film's certification.

== Reception ==
=== Critical reception ===
The Reviews Hub rated the film 6/10, calling it a "rational examination of the impact of institutional corruption in Pakistan" that is "analytical rather than emotional." The review praised Nazualiya Arsalan's performance, noting she "plays Rabia as a dutiful student rather than a rebellious tomboy" and called it "an excellent performance from such a young actor." It also highlighted the film's effective use of demonstration over dialogue, such as a market stall holder being taught basic arithmetic to illustrate the limits of a system that denies higher education to the poor.

In a review for taz.de, Barbara Schweizerhof praised the film as a "successful girl portrait," noting that "without much dialogue, the young actress Nazualiya Arsalan makes clear what is inside her." She commended Seemab Gul's documentary-like approach, stating that "through Rabia's gaze one gets to know the adult world better" and that the film's real message is that "it is easier to talk about jinns than about corrupt civil servants."

In a review for Kino-Zeit, Reinhard Kleber compared the film to Abbas Kiarostami's Where Is the Friend's House?, noting that Rabia's "laborious research is reminiscent of the Iranian children's film classic" while praising the director's use of "small fantastic sprinklings" including a winged white horse that represents "Rabia's probably unfulfillable dream of a better world."

epd Film rated the film 4/5, describing it as a work that "reveals the systemic flaws of Pakistani society and its government" through the perspective of a girl determined to uncover why her school has closed. The review noted that the film uses the village as a microcosm to expose authoritarian patriarchal power structures, and that "ghost schools" are a real phenomenon in Pakistan where institutions are built but never staffed.

In a review for Asian Movie Pulse, Panos Kotzathanasis wrote that "Ghost School emerges as a competent piece of cinema that manages to communicate its themes in a way that is both thought-provoking and engaging," praising Nazualiya Arsalan's "impressive performance" and Zamarin Wahdat's cinematography, though noting that the inclusion of the supernatural "feels somewhat forced in a narrative that had previously been grounded in realism."

In a review for Eye For Film, Jennie Kermode described the film as a "beautifully shot, luminous film" that "shines a light on a real phenomenon which blights millions of lives across the globe, yet, in reminding us that there are always some individuals willing to fight, finds a degree of hope." She praised Arsalan's performance as "exceptional," noting she delivers "a character whose vulnerability is clear but who is utterly certain of her purpose."

In a review for PakistaniCinema.Net, the film's craft was described as failing to "do the message or the art justice," with the reviewer stating that "in trying to be artsy and also push a message (a very noble one), the film doesn't really accomplish either." The review praised the performances, particularly Nazualiya Arsalan as Rabia, noting that "she has the talent that can be polished into a gem." It also highlighted Adnan Shah Tipu and Vajdaan Shah for "well executed performances," and commended the "incredible shots that show off the rugged landscapes of Sindh" as well as the "clear, crisp" sound design. However, the reviewer criticised the screenplay for "very basic mistakes," arguing that the central premise that villagers believe the school is literally haunted is "ludicrous," as "nowhere in Sindh do people believe that these schools are actually haunted." They also pointed to "extremely long, still shots" that padded the runtime and the fact that "everyone in the village speaks clear and proper Urdu," which robbed the film of its realism. The review concluded that "the execution is nothing but middling."

== Accolades ==
| Award / Film Festival | Year | Category | Recipient(s) | Result | Ref. |
|---|---|---|---|---|---|
| Berlin International Film Festival | February 2026 | Grand Prix of the Generation Kplus International Jury | Ghost School | Nominated | |
| Toronto International Film Festival | September 2025 | Best Film – Discovery | Ghost School | Nominated | |
| Indian Film Festival of Los Angeles | April 2026 | Grand Jury Prize – Feature | Ghost School | Honourable Mention | |
| UK Asian Film Festival | May 2026 | Flame Award for Best Director | Seemab Gul | Won | |
| Festival del Cinema Africano, d'Asia e America Latina (FESCAAAL) | March 2026 | Jury Special Mention – Feature Film Competition | Ghost School | Special Mention | |
| Festival del Cinema Africano, d'Asia e America Latina (FESCAAAL) | March 2026 | "Visioni Future" Terre des Hommes Italia Award | Ghost School | Won | |

== See also ==
- List of Pakistani films of 2026
