= Sangsar (TV series) =

- Genre: Serial drama; Family drama; Romantic drama; Revenge
- Written by: Nuzhat Saman
- Directed by: Kamran Akbar Khan
- Starring: Kinza Hashmi; Afraz Rasool; Najiba Faiz; Ali Tahir; Alizeh Tahir; Naeem Tahir; Hammad Farooqui; Laila Wasti
- Original language: Urdu
- No. of episodes: 92

Production
- Executive producer: Momina Duraid
- Producer: Momina Duraid
- Camera setup: Multi-camera setup
- Running time: 17 minutes
- Production company: MD Productions

Original release
- Network: Hum TV
- Release: 3 April – 11 August 2017

Sangsar (Urdu: سنگسار; lit:Stone To Death) is a Pakistani drama serial which was first aired on 3 April 2017 on Hum TV preceding Gila. The drama was directed by Kamran Akbar Khan and written by Nuzhat Saman. It was produced by Momina Duraid under MD Productions.

== Plot ==
Ahmer is a businessman and Roshni is a young graduate from a middle-class family. Both love each other. Ahmer's mother Nadra is landlord of her house who takes advice from a Muslim scholar before deciding family matters. Ahmer's father Fayyaz is a patient who always keeps himself busy in studies and is often depressed because of his past. Ahmer also has a brother, Ashar, and a sister, Mehwish, who is social and short-tempered.

Roshni lives with her father, her brother, Aneeq and his ill-tempered and social wife, Samira. Her mother died after giving birth to Roshni. She is the one who takes care of her father. Ahmer told her mother about his interest in Roshni but she initially refused. After consulting a Muslim scholar, she agreed. Ashar also started liking Roshni but is unaware that his brother is going to marry her as he left abroad for studies. The day Ahmer and Roshni marry and the moment Roshni enters his house, Nadra's maternal uncle dies and she blames Roshni for being unlucky. Ahmer considered her mother to be sad that's why nothing happened. One day, Aneeq and Samira came to Ahmer's house to see Roshni and Samira told Nadra falsely about family matters because of Roshni so that is why Roshni is not accepted by Nadra and Ahmer doesn't know as Roshni remains silent. Later, Ashar returns from abroad and is shocked to see roshni in his house but respects her. One day, Nadra was telling her friend that Roshni is having an affair with Ashar and Roshni overhears this and angrily goes to her room and cries. Ahmer asks her what happened but she moves him out of the room. Immediately after this, Ahmer has an accident and dies. After a few days Ashar marries a meaningless woman who cares about herself. When Mahwish wants to marry Addan, she grabs Mahreen's stuff and Ashar's credit card and leaves one of the jewelry in Roshni's room, but she tells the truth to Nadra and then she pushes her to the bed so that Roshni is covered with the blood of Ashar's father; Nadra realises this when Mahreen pushed her of the stairs.

== Cast ==
- Kinza Hashmi as Roshni
- Afraz Rasool as Ahmer
- Laila Wasti as Nadra
- Hammad Farooqui as Ashar
- Alizeh Tahir as Mehwish
- Yasir Ali Khan as Adnan, Mehwish's husband
- Ali Tahir as Fayyaz
- Naeem Tahir as Roshni's father
- Hassan Noman as Aneeq
- Sarah Baloch as Samira
- Faheem Tijani
- Rehana Akhtar as Mehreen, Ashar's Divorced wife
- Sofia Khan
- Najiba Faiz as Neelum
