= Shafqat Cheema =

Pakistani actor and producer

- شفقت چیمہ
- Born: 20 November 1955 (age 70); Lahore, Punjab, Pakistan
- Occupation: Actor
- Years active: 1989–present
- Children: 6
- Relatives: Nadeem Cheema (brother)

Shafqat Cheema is a Pakistani actor and producer.

In a career spanning more than three decades, he has particularly become known for his fine acting in negative roles and has been called "Pakistan’s favorite villain".

== Early and personal life ==
Shafqat graduated from the Jamia Naeemia, an Islamic seminary affiliated with the Barelvi movement, in 1974. He is the son of a religious scholar and is himself a hafiz (memorizer) and qari (reciter) of the Qur'an.

Before entering the film industry he was a wrestler as well a painter.

Cheema has five daughters and a son, Sheharyar, who starred alongside his father in the 2017 movie Geo Sar Utha Kay, which Cheema also produced, while it was directed by his brother Nadeem Cheema.

== Career ==
According to Shafqat, his acting career began by coincidence, when he walked into the Shahnoor Studios in Lahore. He then decided that he wanted to become a film actor. He struggled for almost twelve years before he was offered a side role in the film Kalka (1989), which also starred Sultan Rahi.

== Selected filmography ==
=== Films ===
Year	Film	Role	Producer	Notes
1989	Kalka			
1991	Kalay Chor			
1992	God-Father			
1992	Munda Bigra Jae			
1993	Zabata			
1994	Zameen Aasman			
1994	Pajero Group	Haji Rasheed Ahmed		
1994	Ghunda Raj			
1995	Munda Bigra Jaye	Ghafoor / Surya		
1996	Baazigar			
1997	Umar Mukhtar			
1998	Choorian			
1999	Kursi Aur Qanoon			
2000	Mehndi Waley Hath			
2001	Moosa Khan			
2002	Toofan			
2004	Sassi Punno			
2006	Majajan			
2007	Jhoomar			
2007	Godfather			
2008	Zill-e-Shah	Abid Shah		
2008	Yarana			Pashto film debut
2011	Bhai Log	Israr David		
2011	Bol	Saqa Kanjar (Panderer)		
2011	Son of Pakistan			
2013	Chambaili			
2013	Main Hoon Shahid Afridi	Bashir Bhatti		
2013	Ishq Khuda			
2014	The System	Corrupt SHO		
2015	Wrong No.	Shera		
2015	Badnam			Pashto film
2016	Ishq Positive			
2016	Zindagi Kitni Haseen Hai	Cheema		
2016	Saya e Khuda e Zuljalal	Subedar Sher Muhammad		
2017	Balu Mahi			
2017	Geo Sar Utha Kay	Kalu	Yes	
2018	Parchi	Zodiac		
2019	Daal Chawal	Bhola Pehlwan		
2019	Wrong No. 2	Choudury		
2021	36 Garh			
2022	The Legend of Maula Jatt	Jeeva Natt		Punjabi film
2022	Zarrar	Ravinder Kaushik		
TBA	Delhi Gate	TBA		Post-production
TBA	Mausam	TBA		Filming
TBA	Jab Tak Hain Hum	TBA		Post-production
TBA	Kambakht	Chaudhry Rustam		Post-production

=== Television series ===
Year	Title	Role	Network	Note
2011	Khuda Aur Muhabbat (season 1)	Ghafoor Coolie	Geo TV	Supporting role
2012	Ashk	Dinga	Hum TV	Supporting role
2013	Heer Ranjha	Kedo	PTV Home	Main antagonist

== See also ==
- List of Lollywood actors
- Shaan Shahid
- Saima
