= Fliggo =

Video sharing website

Fliggo, Inc.
- Company type: C corporation
- Website type: Video hosting service
- Founded: July 2008
- Headquarters: San Francisco, California, United States
- Launched: February 25, 2009
- Current status: Active

Fliggo was a video sharing website where users could create their own private video sharing site. Users could choose who had access to their videos and what they could do on their site. The site eventually merged with video sharing website Vidly, which was later renamed Twitvid.io.

The website was founded in October 2007 by Chrys Bader and Daniel Rhodes and became incorporated in July 2008. Fliggo publicly launched on February 25, 2009, and was relatively well received. Tech Crunch gave an overall positive view of the website but commented that the website had the potential to become "a magnet for videos taken down for copyright violations elsewhere or porn". On September 17, 2009, the site announced that it would merge with Vidly, another video website they run, in November of that same year.
