= Bhook (TV series) =

Pakistani television drama series

- Hina Khawaja Bayat (left) and Maria Wasti
- Written by: Abdull Khaaliq Khan
- Directed by: Mohsin Ali
- Starring: Maria Wasti
- Country of origin: Pakistan
- Original language: Urdu
- No. of episodes: 5

Production
- Producer: Momina Duraid
- Camera setup: Multi-camera setup
- Production company: MD Productions

Original release
- Network: Hum TV
- Release: 10 May – 14 June 2019

Bhook (Urdu: بھوک, lit. 'Hunger') is a 5-episode Pakistani mini series, produced by Momina Duraid under their banner MD Productions. The series aired on Hum TV every Friday replacing Baandi. It explores the story of Noreen played by Maria Wasti who for uncertain reasons killed her own children by serving them poisonous food.

== Cast ==
- Maria Wasti as Naureen
- Kamran Jilani as Aftab (Dead)
- Nazar Ul Hassan as Aziz
- Kosar Siddiqui as Noori
- Saad Azhar as Naseer
- Iftikhar
- Rabiya Shakeel as Rabia
- Muzaffar
- Saad Zameer Faridi
- Malik Sher Afzal as Afzal
- Hina Khawaja Bayat as Gaiti's mother
- Maryam Nafees as Gaiti Araa
- Saad (Child artist) as Saad
- Hamna Amir(Child artist) as Javeria
