= Psycho (2026 film) =

2026 Pakistani psychological thriller film

- Poster
- Directed by: Shaan Shahid
- Written by: Shaan Shahid
- Produced by: Suleman Ahmed Butt
- Starring: Shaan Shahid; Meera; Sonya Hussyn; Javed Sheikh; Shabbir Jan; Nayyar Ejaz
- Production company: Red Lipstick Productions
- Release date: 27 May 2026 (Pakistan)
- Country: Pakistan
- Language: Urdu

Psycho is a 2026 Pakistani Urdu-language Psychological thriller film written and directed by Shaan Shahid. The film stars Shahid, Meera, Sonya Hussyn, Javed Sheikh, Shabbir Jan and Nayyar Ejaz. It was released in Pakistan on 27 May 2026, coinciding with Eid al-Adha.

== Premise ==
The film has been described as a psychological thriller about mental conflict and the boundary between reality and perception.

== Cast ==
- Shaan Shahid
- Meera
- Sonya Hussyn
- Javed Sheikh
- Shabbir Jan
- Nayyar Ejaz
- Adnan Butt

== Production ==
Psycho is written and directed by Shaan Shahid, who also stars in the film. The film is produced under the Red Lipstick banner, with Geo serving as media partner.

Shahid described the film as a psychological thriller focused on the human mind rather than a conventional suspense narrative, while Meera said she approached her role through the psychological background of her character.

== Release ==
The teaser for Psycho was presented at The O2 Arena in London in March 2026. A teaser was subsequently screened for media at a press briefing in Lahore in April 2026. The film's trailer was released later that month ahead of its Eid al-Adha release.

Psycho is released on worldwide theatrical on 27 May 2026, coinciding with Eid al-Adha.

== Reception ==
Writing for Dawn Images, Nawa Tahir criticized its lack of plot, character development, and engaging dialogue. While praising the performances of the main cast, Tahir argued their acting could not compensate for the weak storytelling. Furthermore, she expressed disappointment that the filmmakers relied on dangerous stereotypes about mental illness instead of using the opportunity to foster meaningful awareness.

Writing for Youlin Magazine, Muhammad Suhayb praised the chemistry and technical execution of Shaan and Sonya Hussyn's romantic storyline. However, he found the pairing of Javed Sheikh and Meera confusing due to plot inconsistencies regarding her character's background and motivations. Suhayb also criticized Nayyar Ejaz's antagonist role as stretched and unconvincing, while dismissing Meera's subplot with Adnan Butt as poorly executed.

== See also ==
- List of Pakistani films of 2026
