= Virasat (1999 film) =

- Directed by: Masood Butt
- Produced by: Chaudhry Khadam Hussain
- Starring: Saima; Shaan; Moammar Rana; Meera; Resham; Humayun Qureshi; Kanwal Nauman
- Release date: 10 September 1999
- Country: Pakistan
- Language: Urdu

Virasat is a 1999 Pakistani Urdu action movie starring Saima and Shaan. Film song lyrics by Altaf Bajwa and Saeed Gillani. Singers were Shazia Manzoor, Saira Nasim and Azra Jehan, film music composer is Ustad Tafu.
