= Nadeem Cheema =

Pakistani film director and actor

- Born: September 11, 1986 (age 39); Lahore, Punjab, Pakistan
- Occupations: Actor, Director
- Years active: 2016 – present
- Known for: Delhi Gate (2021); Geo Sar Utha Kay (2017)
- Relatives: Shafqat Cheema (Brother)

Nadeem Cheema is a Pakistani film director and actor. He is best known for action film Geo Sar Utha Kay. He founded the film production company Nadeem Cheema Films.

== Career ==
His first film was Geo Sar Utha Kay (2017). Nadeem Cheema has also worked on the project of film 36 Garh, released in 2021.

== Films ==
Year	Title	Director	Producer
2017	Geo Sar Utha Kay	Yes	Yes
2021	36 Garh	Yes	Yes
2026	Delhi Gate	Yes	No
