= Jindo (TV series) =

2023 Pakistani television serial

- Written by: Qurban Ali Rao
- Directed by: Anjum Shahzad
- Starring: Humaima Malick; Samiya Mumtaz; Gohar Rasheed; Hajra Yamin; Nazrul Hassan
- Opening theme: Schumaila Rehmat Hussain
- Country of origin: Pakistan
- Original languages: Urdu; Rangri
- No. of episodes: 26

Production
- Executive producer: Imran Raza
- Cinematography: Asir Ahmed Khan
- Camera setup: Multi-camera
- Production company: A2W Entertainment

Original release
- Network: Green Entertainment
- Release: 12 July 2023 – 3 January 2024

Jindo is a Pakistani television series directed by Anjum Shahzad and first broadcast on Green Entertainment on 12 July 2023. The series stars Humaima Malick in the titular role in her television comeback after 12 years. The other cast members include Gohar Rasheed, Samiya Mumtaz, Hajra Yamin and Naeema Butt in pivotal roles. The series is based on a true story.

== Plot ==
After giving birth to two children, teenage Jindo's stepmother dies. Jindo raises her half siblings Jugni and Fakira with utmost love and care. However, tragedy strikes when the local landlord Daad Saein rapes her on her wedding night, which leaves a lasting trauma in her life. Years pass and Jindo's siblings get older, and she always teaches them to live life couragously. Jindo's neighbour and Fakira's childhood friend Shano is in love with Fakira. Despite knowing this, Jindo fixes Fakira's marriage with Beena, a girl from another village, and Shano is left heartbroken. During the wedding ceremony, Daad Saein's son Hasrat tries to kidnap Beena, and ends up killing Jindo's husband Bakshu who tries to save Beena. Bakshu is killed, Fakira gets injured and Beena is taken to the Haveli, but she manages to escape successfully.

Hasrat gets married again, this time to Falak, a girl from a neighbouring village. The rebellious Falak then takes revenge of this injustice by destroying the inhabitants of this haveli. When Hasrat and Daad Saein come to know about the former's first wife Rakhna's pregnancy, they pressure her to give birth to a male baby, otherwise she will be killed. To save her life, Rakhna runs away from the haveli. She takes shelter in Jindo's house and dies shortly after giving birth to a girl. While looking for Rakhna in the village, Hasrat comes across Jugni and starts lusting after her. To sell slaughtering animals for Eid-ul-Fitr, Fakira goes to city for some days.

In the tumultuous events following Jindo's refusal to grant Jugni to Hasrat for a day, Daad Saein orchestrates a deceptive game, falsely accusing Jugni of an illicit affair with a man from Haveli. The Panchiyat, convened by Daad Saein, unfairly accepts a fabricated admission from a Haveli man, denying Jindo, Hasrat, and her Aunt a fair trial. Fakira is unjustly subjected to the Charbeli tradition, forced to walk on fire, and Jindo sacrifices herself to spare her brother by walking on burning coals.

Manipulating the situation, Daad Saein adds salt to the fire, causing burns on Jindo's feet. Jugni, punished by being left in the desert heat, later becomes a victim of rape by Hasrat, resulting in pregnancy. Meanwhile, Fakira, away in the city for Eid-ul-Fitr, returns to discover Jindo's attempt to conceal Jugni's trauma. In a quest for justice, Fakira retaliates by taking the lives of those who provided false testimony against Jugni and then goes into hiding.

Learning of Jugni's pregnancy, Daad Saein proposes marriage between her and Hasrat. Despite Fakira's absence, Jugni is wedded to Hasrat while he remains in hiding.

After some time, Jindo returns as powerful Pirni Sarkar Bibi to avenge the injustices and oppression done to her.

== Cast ==
- Humaima Malick as Jindo/ Sarkar Bibi
- Gohar Rasheed as Hasrat
- Samiya Mumtaz as Bandi
- Nazrul Hassan as Daad Saein
- Hajra Yamin as Falak
- Naeema Butt as Shano
- Faraz Ali as Fakira
- Malik Raza as Bakhshu
- Ayesha Gul as Kajli
- Mizna Waqas as Rukhna
- Farah Nadir as Khala
- Saad Farrukh Khan as Baali
- Saleem Mairaj as Gallu
- Razia Malik as Gallu's mother
- Areeba Ahmed Tirmizi as Jeena

== Soundtrack ==
"Jindo - O Rabba Ho"

Song by Schumaila Rehmat Hussain
- Released: 13 June 2023
- Length: 3:53
- Composer: Schumaila Rehmat Hussain
- Lyricist: Ahad Siddiqui

Music video
- "Jindo" Lyrical OST on YouTube

The official soundtrack of the series "O Rabba Ho" is performed by Schumaila Rehmat Hussain who composed the music as well along with Faraz Rizvi. The lyrics were by Ahad Siddiqui.

== Production ==
In September 2022, Gohar Rasheed revealed in an interview with DAWN Images that he is starring in Jindo alongside Humaima Malick, Hajra Yamin and Saleem Mairaj. Malick was chosen to portray the title role of Jindo which was previously offered to Aamina Sheikh who rejected it due to her personal reasons. In October, Malick revealed about the storyline of the series which revolves around a woman's fight against injustice and feudalism. The entire filming of the series was held in Cholistan Desert and Bahawalpur (City Scenes) which took three months. The building shown as Mah of Daad Sain is Karachi Metropolitan Corporation Building Malick learnt the Rangri language for the series to portray the character of a woman from desert.

The official trailer of the series was released in April 2023.

== Reception ==
=== Critics ===
The News International praised the OST of the series stating, "Schumaila Rehmat Hussain, brings the lyrics to life with her passionate vocals, enhancing the emotional impact of the song."

In a review of the first episode by Galaxy Lollywood, the riveting plot and the portrayal of oppressed women was praised. The review however mentioned the inconsistent dialects of the actors and the confusion of timelines. The judges of the show Yeh Kya Drama Hai praised the portrayal of romance in the series while reviewing an episode. In a review by Youlin Magazine, the series was praised for its cinematography, story and the performances of Malick, Hassan and Butt.
