= Naeem Tahir =

Pakistani TV actor

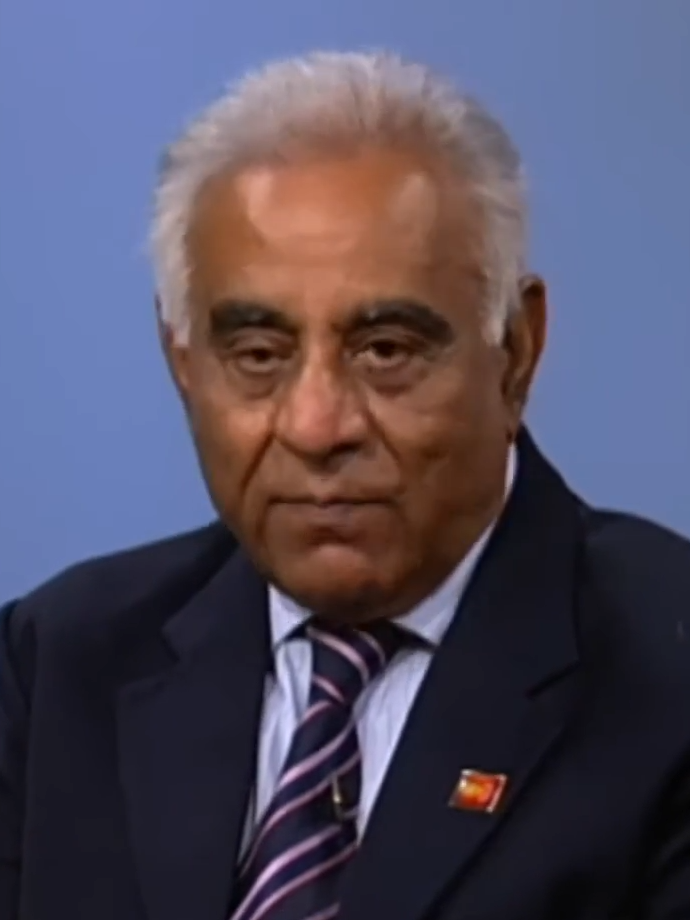
- Tahir in 2016
- Born: 26 February 1937 (age 89); Amritsar, Punjab, British India
- Occupations: Actor; Public speaker; Columnist; Teacher; Dramatist
- Years active: 1960 – present
- Spouse: Yasmeen Tahir
- Children: Faran Tahir; Mehran Tahir; Ali Tahir
- Relatives: Imtiaz Ali Taj (father-in-law); Hijab Imtiaz Ali (mother-in-law); Lena Tahir; Muhammadi Begum (father-in-law's mother)

Naeem Tahir (born 26 February 1937) is a Pakistani theatre, film and television actor, scholar, public speaker, newspaper columnist, teacher and dramatist.

== Career ==
His research work on the Pre-History of the People of Indus Valley was published by the National Council of the Arts Islamabad. His other publications include 'Views and Comments', a collection of 60 articles published in Daily Times newspaper. Volume 2 of this series contains over 100 articles. Also in publication are his articles in English published in different magazines and newspapers.

His publication of 'Jalsa Urdu Dramay Ka' is in Urdu. It was staged at the World Urdu Conference Islamabad and later at Alhamra, the Lahore Arts Council. Another rare form of an epic drama in Urdu has been written by Tahir under the title 'Sael-e-Rawan'. It is a researched narrative dramatized for stage. The subject is the rise and fall of the Muslim Empire and later the freedom struggle in the Indo-Pakistan Sub-Continent. The narrative covers the period from 1609 to August 1947. The play has been repeatedly staged and is published along with other outstanding works as "Land Mark Theatre' by Pakistan National Council of the Arts, Islamabad, Pakistan.

Naeem Tahir has several other works telecast/ broadcast by Pakistan's networks. His research-based work on terrorism was serialized as 'Samjhota Express'. Some of the subjects of his research include the roots, history and extent of terrorism in Pakistan and India. During his stay in the US in 2000, he was the COO of ICTV, a satellite channel in Urdu and English based in Irvine, California.

He has written two scripts for future film production namely 'Bombay by Boat' and 'God is Mine'. Naeem Tahir holds degrees of BSc and MA (Psychology) from University of Punjab, Lahore and a bachelor's degree in Theatre Arts from the University of California at Los Angeles. As a scholar, he continues to update his knowledge.

== Trainer of Pakistani television personnel ==
Naeem Tahir taught theatre subjects in the 1960s at the Lahore Arts Council, located at the Alhamra Arts Council building in Lahore, Pakistan. From 1968 to 1970, Naeem Tahir was appointed Principal, Central Television Institute, Islamabad, now known as Pakistan Television Academy, where he trained all entrants at the newly established TV networks in Pakistan, which at the time also included present-day Bangladesh. He was responsible for developing the curriculum in consultation with a German and Pakistani faculty. He taught 'Analysis and interpretation' of scripts. Many Pakistani stage and television artists including Irfan Khoosat (PTV's drama 'Direct Havaldar' role fame) have expressed their appreciation for him training them in their early days.

He is a visiting lecturer at the highest training centre for senior civil servants in Lahore named until recently as Civil Services of Pakistan.

Tahir has held administrative positions in the Government of Pakistan. His last appointment was as Chief Executive, Pakistan National Council of Arts, Ministry of Culture. He successfully completed and commissioned the National Art Gallery, popularly called, the 'Jewel of Islamabad' and taken note of by the international media. The National Art Gallery project was entirely developed during his tenure and under his supervision. The National art Gallery complex is spread over 143,000 Sq. Meters and houses 14 exhibition galleries, a modern theatre hall and studios. During his tenure, Tahir developed a program of 'Cultural Understanding through Performing Arts' with the John F. Kennedy Center for the Performing Arts at Washington. It was a three-year program which was partly implemented during his tenure.

== 'Alhamra Arts Centre' building developer ==
Earlier, in his tenure in 1972, at the Arts Council in Lahore, he helped complete the construction and commissioning of the 'Alhamra Arts Centre' building which includes two theatre halls and several art exhibition galleries, music centre and seminar halls. In 1963, the land was purchased and Naeem Tahir initiated a vigorous struggle with former President Ayub Khan's government to get the funds finally approved in 1966. These are just some of Tahir's tangible contributions, which form part of his legacy.

In 1965, he led a delegation and asked veteran Pakistani music director Feroz Nizami compose a musical program based on folk heritage themes for the first cultural delegation of 48 members to China.

In 2005, he was designated to head the Pakistani delegation to the Asia Culture Ministers Conference in Beijing. He has earlier been head of several cultural, goodwill and trade delegations to Europe, and South Asian Countries. Presently, he is Chairman of the Unesco Theatre Institute Pakistan.

== Filmography ==
- Producer Shoaib Mansoor's - Khuda Kay Liye (2007 film)

== Television ==
- Muhabat Subh Ka Sitara Hai (2014)
- Mann Mayal (2016)
- Sangsaar (2017)
- Jannat (2017)

== Published works ==
- Jalsa Urdu Dramay Ka (Urdu)
- Samjhota Express (Urdu)
- Melluhas of the Indus Valley (English)
- The Landmark Theatre (Urdu)
- Views and Comments, 2 Volumes (English)
- App Kee Tareef (Urdu)
- Seilay Rowan (Urdu)
- Sayyidah Muhammadi Begum awr Unka Khandan (transl. Sayyidah Muhammadi Begum and her family), a biography of Naeem Tahir's grandmother, Muhammadi Begum.
