= Gail Minault =

American historian (born 1939)

- Born: March 25, 1939 (age 86); Minneapolis, Minnesota
- Education: Northfield School for Girls
- Alma mater: Smith College; University of Pennsylvania (M.A., Ph.D)
- Occupation: Historian
- Spouses: Thomas Graham, Jr.; Leon W. Ellsworth

Gail Minault (born March 25, 1939) is an American historian of South Asia.

== Life ==
Gail Minault was born in Minneapolis, Minnesota on March 25, 1939. She was educated in the public schools of Pottstown, Pennsylvania, before completing high school at the Northfield School for Girls in Northfield, Massachusetts. While attending Smith College, Minault spent her junior year abroad attending the École Libre des Sciences Politiques in Paris, France, and graduated in 1961. Minault then worked three years for the United States Foreign Service in Washington, D.C., Beirut, Lebanon, and East Pakistan (now Bangladesh) before resigning to study South Asian history at the University of Pennsylvania. She was awarded her M.A. degree in South Asian regional studies in 1966 and her Ph.D. six years later. Minault has been married twice. Minault's first marriage, to Thomas Graham, Jr., ended in divorce after the death of their son. She remarried Leon W. Ellsworth. Minault has one adopted daughter from her first marriage and a stepson from her second. Minault began teaching at the University of Texas and has written or co-editor of five books and thirty-five scholarly articles.
