= Miss Pakistan Universal =

Pakistan's National Beauty Pageant

- مس پاکستان یونیورسل
- Formation: 2022
- Type: Pakistan's National: Beauty pageant; Organization
- Headquarters: Toronto, Canada & Lahore, Pakistan
- Location(s): Pakistan & Canada
- Members: Universal Pageants
- Official language: English, Urdu, Punjabi
- President: Sonia Ahmed
- Founder: Sonia Ahmed
- Parent organization: Miss Pakistan World (2005–Present)
- Website: http://misspakistanworld.com/

Miss Pakistan Universal (Urdu: مس پاکستان یونیورسل) is a national beauty pageant title awarded to Pakistani representatives competing at the various international contests like Miss Aura International, Miss Planet and Miss Elite.

The title "Miss Pakistan Universal" was first created by president of Miss Pakistan World Sonia Ahmed when the winner of Miss Pakistan Universal was assigned to represent the country at the Miss Aura International 2022 in Turkey.

== History ==
The first Miss Pakistan Universal was crowned on 31 January 2022 in Lahore, Pakistan. Dr. Shafaq Akhtar was also the first Christian girl to even win a pageant and represent Pakistan internationally. She was also the first working doctor to win the Miss Pakistan Universal title.

Shafaq Akhtar took part in three international pageants from 2022 to 2023. She was the first delegate sent to Miss Aura International 2022 in Antalya, Turkey, as well as Miss Planet 2023 in Cambodia and finally Miss Elite 2023 in Egypt. She further went on to win two titles for Pakistan. She won a sponsor title Miss Rixos Sungate in Miss Aura International 2023 and Miss Humanity in Miss Planet International 2023.

On 31 May 2023, the second Miss Pakistan Universal was crowned, and this time this was the first Bangladeshi decent girl from Karachi to be crowned. Kapotaqkhy Chanchala was inspired by Shafaq Akhtar and applied for the pageant. Kapotaqkhy went on to participate in Miss World Tourism 2023 in Colombo, Sri Lanka and then was assigned to the third largest pageant in the world, Miss Earth 2023.

In a press conference in Karachi, Pakistan, Kapotaqkhy Chanchala along with Areej Chaudhary, Miss Pakistan World 2020 urged young girls especially professionals to partake in pageants.

On May 31, 2024 the next Miss Pakistan Universal 2024 was crowned in the Faletti's Hotel in Lahore, Pakistan. This was the third year of Miss Pakistan Universal. On May 30, 2025 Afshan Ahmad Sial was crowned Miss Pakistan Universal 2025.

== Miss Pakistan Universal ==
Year	Representative	Province	Host city	Host country
2026		Punjab	Lahore	Pakistan
2025	Afshan Ahmad Sial	Punjab	Lahore	Pakistan
2024	Kokab Mehmood	Punjab	Lahore	Pakistan
2023	Dr. Kapotaqkhy Chanchala	Punjab	Lahore	Pakistan
2022	Dr. Shafaq Akhtar	Punjab	Lahore	Pakistan

=== Wins by province ===
Province	Titles	Years
Punjab	3	2022, 2024
Sindh	1	2023

== International pageants ==
- : Declared as Winner
- : Ended as runner-up or top 5/6 qualification
- : Ended as one of the finalists or semifinalists
- : Ended as special awards winner

Year	Representative	International Pageant	Titles won	Host country
2023	Kapotaqkhy Chanchala	Miss Earth 2023	Did Not Place	Vietnam
2023	Kapotaqkhy Chanchala	Miss World Tourism 2023	Did Not Place	Sri Lanka
2023	Shafaq Akhtar	Miss Elite 2023	Did Not Place	Egypt
2023	Shafaq Akhtar	Miss Planet International 2023	Miss Humanity (Won)	Cambodia
2022	Shafaq Akhtar	Miss Aura International 2022	Miss Rixos Sungate (Won)	Turkey

== See also ==
- Miss Universe Pakistan
- Miss Pakistan World
- Mrs. Pakistan World
- Miss Trans Pakistan
- Miss Earth Pakistan
- Miss Grand Pakistan
