= Miss Pakistan World =

Pakistan's National Beauty Pageant

- Formation: 2002
- Type: Pakistan's National Beauty pageant
- Headquarters: Toronto, Lahore
- Location: Canada, Pakistan
- Members: Miss World; Miss Supranational; Miss Earth; Miss International; Miss Global; Miss Cosmo
- Official language: English, Urdu, Punjabi
- President: Sonia Ahmed (since 2002)
- Website: Miss Pakistan Official website

Miss Pakistan World is the oldest national beauty pageant for women of Pakistani descent from around the world that selects the Pakistan's official representative to international pageants including Miss World, Miss Earth, Miss Supranational, Miss Cosmo, Miss International and Miss Global. In 2026, they selected the first Miss World representative for Pakistan.The event used to be held in Toronto, Canada but has moved to Pakistan and is held annually in Lahore, Pakistan.

== History ==
=== Launched in Canada & USA ===
The pageant was originally launched in 2002 by Sonia Ahmed under the name of Miss Canada Pakistan. The organizers held the event in Canada due to security concerns and the general attitude towards pageants held by the Pakistani public. The pageant has taken place in Canada every year since with the exception of 2014, which was held in New Jersey. The first Miss Pakistan World to be crowned was Zehra Sheerazi on 1 February 2003.

=== Moved to Pakistan ===
In 2020, during Covid-19, the Miss Pakistan World pageant moved to Lahore, Pakistan. The first Miss Pakistan World to be crowned on the soil of Pakistan in August 2020 was Areej Chaudhary. On 23 May 2021, Miss Pakistan World announced that it would allow trans women to compete in a separate pageant called Miss Trans Pakistan. Shyraa Roy became the first trans woman to win the Miss Trans Pakistan 2021 title.

On 31 January 2022, the crowning ceremony was held in a bigger way and new titles were introduced; Miss Pakistan Universal, Miss Pakistan Supreme, Miss Pakistan National, Miss Pakistan Global, Ms. Pakistan Universe, Mrs. Pakistan Universal, Mr. Pakistan Universal and Mr. Pakistan Global.

In 2022, the first Christian girl, Dr. Shafaq Akhtar was crowned Miss Pakistan Universal in Lahore, and went on to compete in 3 international pageants and since then brought back two winning titles for Pakistan. She is scheduled for 2 more international pageants in the coming years.

On May 31, 2023, the crowning ceremony was held in Lahore, Pakistan and 8 new girls were crowned including the next transgender girl crowned on the soil of Pakistan, Alina Khan. On May 31, 2023, one of the first Pakistani girl of Bangladeshi descent, Dr. Kapotaqkhy Chanchala was crowned Miss Pakistan Universal 2023. She has represented Pakistan in the Miss World Tourism 2023 in Sri Lanka and in Miss Earth 2023 in Vietnam as Miss Earth Pakistan 2023.

On 24 May 2024, Lahore saw yet another national pageant with the crowning of new winners. On the 30th of May 2025, the 6th Mr. & Miss Pakistan Event was held in Lahore, Pakistan.

=== Entry into Miss World ===
On 15 July 2026, after 25 years, the pageant officially entered Miss World with Anniqa Jamal Iqbal as the first ever candidate to represent Pakistan in the biggest pageant in the world with 120 contestants participating.

== Titleholders ==
=== Miss Pakistan World ===
Year	Representative	From	Host city	Host country
2026	TBA	Punjab	Lahore	Pakistan
2025	Mia Sadique	Punjab	Lahore	Pakistan
2024	Wajiha Ihsan	Sindh	Lahore	Pakistan
2023	Misbah Arshad	Punjab	Lahore	Pakistan
2022	Anniqa Meraj	Punjab	Lahore	Pakistan
2020 & 2021	Areej Chaudhary	Islamabad	Lahore	Pakistan
2019	Arooj Bokahri	Punjab	Lahore	Pakistan
2017–18	Diya Ali	Punjab	Lahore	Pakistan
2016–17	Ramina Ashfaque	Sindh	Toronto	Canada
2015	Anzhelika Tahir	Punjab	Toronto	Canada
2014	Aatka Feroz	Punjab	New Jersey	United States
2013	Shanzay Hayat	Khyber Pakhtunkhwa	Mississauga	Canada
2012	Zanib Naveed	Punjab	Mississauga	Canada
2011	Sanober Hussain	Punjab	Mississauga	Canada
2010	Annie Rupani	Sindh	Mississauga	Canada
2009	Ayesha Gilani	Punjab	Mississauga	Canada
2008	Natasha Paracha	Punjab	Mississauga	Canada
2007	Mahleej Sarkari	Balochistan	Mississauga	Canada
2006	Sehr Mahmood	Sindh	Mississauga	Canada
2005	Naomi Zaman	Punjab	Mississauga	Canada
2004	Batool Cheema	Punjab	Mississauga	Canada
2003	Zehra Sheerazi	Sindh	Ottawa	Canada

=== Wins by province ===
Province	Titles	Years
Punjab	12	2004, 2005, 2008, 2009, 2011, 2012, 2014, 2015, 2018, 2022, 2023, 2025
Sindh	7	2003, 2006, 2010, 2016, 2017, 2024, 2023
Balochistan	1	2007
Khyber Pakhtunkhwa	1	2013
Islamabad	2	2019, 2020, 2021

=== Mrs Pakistan World ===
Mrs. Pakistan World
- مسز پاکستان ورلڈ
- Formation: 2007
- Type: Beauty Pageant
- Headquarters: Toronto, Lahore
- Location: Pakistan
- Official language: English, Urdu, Punjabi
- President: Sonia Ahmed Since 2007.
- Website: Mrs. Pakistan Official website

Mrs. Pakistan World (Urdu: مسز پاکستان ورلڈ ) is a beauty pageant hosted in Toronto for married women of Pakistani descent. The contest was launched in 2007 with Misbah Yasin–Iqbal being the first winner. Saiyma Haroon, Mrs. Pakistan World 2012 was the first Pakistani married woman to win from Norway. In 2018, Usma Kashaf was sent to Lady of Brilliancy in Taiwan and won the title "Lady of Popularity" for Pakistan. In 2020, Ravish Zahid–Thomas became the first Catholic Pakistani to win Mrs. Pakistan World. In 2022 the first Mrs. Pakistan World was crowned on the soil of Pakistan. Nida Khan was the first married woman at age 26 to be crowned in Lahore, Pakistan. In 2023 the winner of Mrs. Pakistan World 2023 was Fatima Fakhar.

Year	Representative	From	Host city	Host Province	References
2024-25	TBA	Punjab	Lahore	Punjab	
2023-24	Fatima Fakhar	Punjab	Lahore	Punjab	
2022	Nida Khan	Punjab	Lahore	Punjab	
2020–21	Ravish Zahid–Thomas	Punjab	Lahore	Punjab	
2019	Humaira Iqbal	Punjab	Lahore	Punjab	
2017–18	Usma Kashaf	Punjab	Toronto	Canada	
2016	Muskan Jay	Punjab	Toronto	Canada	
2015	Noor Sheheryar	Punjab	Toronto	Canada	
2014	Mariam Mohammad	Khyber Pakhtunkhwa	Toronto	Canada	
2013	Farah Mahmood	Punjab	Toronto	Canada	
2012	Saiyma Haroon	Punjab	Toronto	Canada	
2011	Nyla Hasan	Sindh	Toronto	Canada	
2009–10	Tahmena Bokhari	Punjab	Toronto	Canada	
2008	Saman Hasnain	Punjab	Toronto	Canada	
2007	Misbah Yasin–Iqbal	Sindh	Toronto	Canada	

=== Wins by province ===
Province	Titles	Years
Punjab	11	2008, 2009, 2012, 2013, 2015, 2017, 2018, 2019, 2020, 2021, 2023, 2024
Sindh	2	2007, 2011
Balochistan	0	None
Khyber Pakhtunkhwa	1	2013
Islamabad	0	None

=== Miss Trans Pakistan ===
On 23 May 2021, the first Miss Trans Pakistan was announced. The crowning ceremony took place in Lahore, Pakistan on 25 May 2021.

Year	Representative	From	Host city	Host country
2023 & 2024	Alina Khan	Lahore, Punjab	Lahore	Pakistan
2021 & 2022	Shyraa Roy	Sialkot , Punjab	Lahore	Pakistan

== Editions ==
In January 2022, Sonia Ahmed began the first pageant on Pakistani soil in Lahore, Pakistan. This was initiated after the crowning of Areej Chaudhary in August 2020 and the successful launch of the Miss Trans Pakistan pageant on 25 May 2021. The ceremony for the winners of Miss Pakistan, Mrs. Pakistan and Mr. Pakistan took place on 31 January 2022.

Both overseas Pakistanis and local Pakistanis are allowed to participate in the pageants and the ceremony takes place in Lahore, Pakistan.

=== Pakistan & Overseas Edition 2025 ===
The 2025 edition o Mr. and Miss Pakistan will be taking place in Lahore, Pakistan.

Year	Representative	Title	Representing	Host city	Host country
2025	Afshan Ahmad	Miss Pakistan Universal	Lahore, Punjab	Lahore	Pakistan
2025	Syeda Dua-e-Khadija	Miss Pakistan Global	Peshawar, Khyber Pakhtunkhwa	Lahore	Pakistan
2025	Syeda Fizza Fatima Naqvi	Ms. Pakistan World	Lahore, Punjab	Lahore	Pakistan
2025	Saba Chaudhary	Miss Pakistan Supreme	Islamabad	Lahore	Pakistan
2025	Mia Sadique	Miss Pakistan World	Lahore, Punjab	Lahore	Pakistan
2025	Hassan Abdullah	Mr. Pakistan World	Islamabad	Lahore	Pakistan

=== Pakistan & Overseas Edition 2024 ===
The 2024 edition of Mr. and Miss Pakistan took place at the Faletti's Hotel in Lahore, Pakistan. This was the 5th event held in Lahore, after the first crowning that took place in 2020, followed by the Miss Trans Pakistan inaugural event, and then the ceremonies for Mr. & Miss Pakistan 2022, 2023 and the current year of 2024.

These winners will be off to represent Pakistan internationally in the upcoming international pageants.

Year	Representative	Title	Representing	Host city	Host country
2024	Kokab Mahmood	Miss Pakistan Universal	Lahore, Punjab	Lahore	Pakistan
2024	Mehwish Butt	Miss Pakistan Global	Lahore, Punjab	Lahore	Pakistan
2024	Dr. Rabail Aslam	Ms. Pakistan World	Lahore, Punjab	Lahore	Pakistan
2024	Ali Javaid	Mr. Pakistan Universal	Karachi, Sindh	Lahore	Pakistan
2024	Wajiha Ihsan	Miss Pakistan World	Karachi, Sindh	Lahore	Pakistan
2024	Usman Janjua	Mr. Pakistan World	Lahore, Punjab	Lahore	Pakistan

=== Pakistan & Overseas Edition 2023 ===
The Miss Pakistan 2023 ceremony took place at the Grand Palm Hotel in Lahore, Pakistan and the new titleholders were crowned by Areej Chaudhary and Dr. Shafaq Akhtar. In the month of July 2023, Dr. Kapotaqkhy Chanchala, Miss Pakistan Universal 2023 was sent to Miss World Tourism 2023 in Sri Lanka and will be representing Pakistan in the Miss Earth 2023 pageant to be held in Vietnam.

Year	Representative	Title	Representing	Host city	Host country
2023	Kapotaqkhy Chanchala	Miss Pakistan Universal	Karachi, Sindh	Lahore	Pakistan
2023	Warda Muneeb Rao	Miss Pakistan Global	Lahore, Punjab	Lahore	Pakistan
2023	Shafina Shah	Ms. Pakistan World	Islamabad	Lahore	Pakistan
2023	Beenish George	Ms. Pakistan Universe	Lahore, Punjab	Lahore	Pakistan
2023	Fatima Fakhar	Mrs. Pakistan World	Lahore, Punjab	Lahore	Pakistan
2023	Sabeen Baledina	Miss Pakistan Supreme	Karachi, Sindh	Lahore	Pakistan
2023	Misbah Arshad	Miss Pakistan World	Lahore, Punjab	Lahore	Pakistan
2023	Alina Khan	Miss Trans Pakistan	Lahore, Punjab	Lahore	Pakistan

=== Pakistan & Overseas Edition 2022 ===
The 2022 edition took place at the Alladin's Lounge in Gulberg, Lahore on 31 January 2022.

In September 2022, Dr. Shafaq Akhtar represented Pakistan in Miss Aura International 2022 in Turkey, and was sent to Miss Planet International 2023 held in Vietnam in the month of January. She won the title of Miss Humanity in Miss Planet and had also won the title of Miss Rixos Sungate (a sponsor title) in Miss Aura International. She later participated in Miss Elite 2023 in Egypt but did not win any title.

Year	Representative	Title	Representing	Host city	Host country
2022	Shafaq Akhtar	Miss Pakistan Universal	Lahore, Punjab	Lahore	Pakistan
2022	Sana Hayat	Miss Pakistan Global	Lahore, Punjab	Lahore	Pakistan
2022	Alamdar Khan	Mr. Pakistan Universal	Islamabad	Lahore	Pakistan
2022	Muhammad Umer	Mr. Pakistan Global	Lahore, Punjab	Lahore	Pakistan
2022	Nida Khan	Mrs. Pakistan World	Lahore, Punjab	Lahore	Pakistan
2022	Attaullah Gujjar	Mr. Pakistan World	Faisalabad, Punjab	Lahore	Pakistan

Year	Representative	Title	Representing	Host city	Host country
2022	Anniqa Meraj	Miss Pakistan World	Lahore, Punjab	Lahore	Pakistan
2022	Sara Kast	Miss Pakistan National	Lahore, Punjab	Lahore	Pakistan
2022	Sabrina Wasim	Miss Pakistan Supreme	Lahore, Punjab	Lahore	Pakistan
2022	Uroosa Raza	Mrs. Pakistan Universal	Karachi, Sindh	Lahore	Pakistan

== Top Pageant Representatives ==
The following Pakistani beauty queens have represented Pakistan in the top Big Four international beauty pageants major international beauty pageants for women.

In 2005, Naomi Zaman became the first girl to represent Pakistan in Miss Earth 2005 as Miss Earth Pakistan.In 2013, Shanzay Hayat, Miss Pakistan World 2013 was the first contestant to represent Pakistan in Miss Grand International 2013 as Miss Grand Pakistan. In 2018, Anzhelika Tahir became the first Pakistani beauty queen to represent Pakistan in Miss Supranational. She represented Pakistan in Miss Supranational 2018 in Warsaw, Poland. In 2023, Misbah Arshad became the first delegate to represent Pakistan in Miss International. She represented Pakistan in Miss International 2023 in Tokyo, Japan. In 2026, Anniqa Meraj became the first Pakistani beauty pageant titleholder to represent Pakistan in Miss World 2026 in Vietnam.

=== Miss World ===
Following are the representatives of Miss World Pakistan at Miss World pageant.

- : Declared as Winner
- : Ended as runner-up or top 5/6 qualification
- : Ended as one of the finalists or semifinalists
- : Ended as special awards winner

Year	Province	Miss Pakistan	Placement at Miss World	Special Awards
2027	Punjab	TBA	TBA	
2026	Punjab	Anniqa Jamal Iqbal	TBA	

=== Miss Earth Pakistan ===
Following are the representatives of Miss Earth Pakistan at Miss Earth pageant.

- : Declared as Winner
- : Ended as runner-up or top 5/6 qualification
- : Ended as one of the finalists or semifinalists
- : Ended as special awards winner

Year	City Province	Miss Earth Pakistan	Placement at Miss Earth	Special Awards
2025	Khyber Pakhtunkhwa	Dua-e-Khadija	Unplaced	Gold Medal for Group Earth Project
2024	Gujrat	Mehwish Butt	Unplaced	
2023	Sindh	Kapotaqkhy Chanchala	Unplaced	
2022	Punjab	Anniqa Jamal Iqbal	Unplaced	
2021	Did not compete			
2020	Punjab	Areej Chaudhary	Unplaced	
Did not compete between 2018—2019
2017	Sindh	Ramina Ashfaque	Unplaced	
2016	Punjab	Anzhelika Tahir	Unplaced	Talent Competition Winner
2015	Did not compete			
2014	Khyber Pakhtunkhwa	Shanzay Hayat	Unplaced	Talent Competition Winner
2013	Did not compete			
2012	Punjab	Zanib Naveed	Unplaced	Silver Medal
2011	Punjab	Sanober Hussain	Unplaced	Miss Friendship
2010	Did not compete			
2009	Punjab	Ayesha Gilani	Unplaced	
2008	Jhelum	Nosheen Idrees	Unplaced	
2007	Did not compete			
2006	Sindh	Sehr Mahmood	Unplaced	
2005	Punjab	Naomi Zaman	Unplaced	

=== Miss International ===
Following are the representatives of Miss International Pakistan at Miss International pageant.

- : Declared as Winner
- : Ended as runner-up or top 5/6 qualification
- : Ended as one of the finalists or semifinalists
- : Ended as special awards winner

Year	Province	Miss Pakistan	Placement at Miss International	Special Awards
2025	Punjab	Mia Sadique	Unplaced	None
2024	Did not compete			
2023	Punjab	Misbah Arshad	Unplaced	None

=== Miss Supranational ===
The first Miss Pakistan World to represent Pakistan at the Miss Supranational pageant was Anzhelika Tahir, followed by other Miss Pakistan World winners. Miss Pakistan World 2023 Misbah Arshad and Miss Pakistan World 2021 Aina Qureishi both have participated but unplaced.

Following are the representatives of Miss Supranational Pakistan at Miss Supranational pageant.

- : Declared as Winner
- : Ended as runner-up or top 5/6 qualification
- : Ended as one of the finalists or semifinalists
- : Ended as special awards winner

Year	Province	Miss Pakistan	Placement at Miss Supranational	Special Awards
2026	Rawalpindi	Azqa Sohail	TBA	TBA
2025	Did not compete	No Representation	Unplaced	None
2024	Punjab	Misbah Arshad	Unplaced	None
Did not compete between 2019—2023
2018	Punjab	Anzhelika Tahir	Top 25	

=== Miss Cosmo ===
Following are the representatives of Miss Cosmo Pakistan at Miss Cosmo pageant.

- : Declared as Winner
- : Ended as runner-up or top 5/6 qualification
- : Ended as one of the finalists or semifinalists
- : Ended as special awards winner

Year	Province	Miss Pakistan	Placement at Miss Cosmo	Special Awards
2025	Punjab	Mia Sadique	Unplaced	None
2024	Punjab	Anniqa Jamal Iqbal	Unplaced	None

== Controversies ==
The pageant has been criticized by Pakistani feminist Amna Buttar of the Asian-American Network Against Abuse of Human Rights, who wrote in an email to the New York Times, "In Pakistan, we are trying to get basic rights for women: right to marry, right to divorce, equal opportunity for job and education, and issues like Miss Pakistan create problems for this movement. An average Pakistani young woman does not want to wear a bikini in public, and for her it is important to have equal opportunity and all focus should be on that, and not on a pageant where only the elite can participate." Sonia Ahmed, the president of Miss Pakistan World, defended the event as a movement for self-expression, saying that the participants have the freedom to do as they wish. In 2006, Culture Ministry official Abdul Hafeez Chaudhry questioned the wearing of bikinis to represent Pakistan.

In 2010 the organizers were criticized for holding the pageant in Ramadan and during the 2010 Pakistan floods.

== See also ==
- Sonia Ahmed
- Mrs. Pakistan World
- Miss Trans Pakistan
- Miss Earth Pakistan
- Miss Grand Pakistan
- Miss Pakistan Universal
