= Miss Trans Pakistan =

Beauty pageant and contest

- Formation: 2021
- Type: Beauty Pageant
- Headquarters: Toronto, Canada & Lahore, Pakistan
- Location: Pakistan
- Members: Miss International Queen
- Official language: English, Urdu, Punjabi
- President: Sonia Ahmed (since 2021)
- Parent organization: Miss Pakistan World (2021–Present)
- Website: Miss Trans Pakistan Official website

Miss Trans Pakistan is a pageant for the trans women of Pakistan founded by Sonia Ahmed. It is part of the Miss Pakistan World pageant.

== History ==
In 2020, during COVID-19, the Miss Pakistan World pageant moved from Toronto Canada to Lahore, Pakistan. The first Miss Pakistan World crowned in Pakistan in August 2020 was Areej Chaudhary.This allowed the pageant to expand to allow trans women to become part of Pakistan's pageantry.

The pageant brought attention to the plight of trans women in Pakistan through their titleholders. The news of the crowning of the first Miss Trans Pakistan was the most read news in Pakistan and came in the top ten news of the year in Pakistan's leading English newspaper Dawn.

On 23 May 2021, Miss Pakistan World announced that it would allow trans women to compete in a separate pageant called Miss Trans Pakistan. On 23 May 2021, the first Miss Trans Pakistan was announced. The crowning ceremony took place in Lahore, Pakistan on 25 May 2021.

Shyraa Roy became the first trans woman to win the Miss Trans Pakistan 2021 title.

On Jan 31, 2022, the crowning ceremony of Miss Pakistan was held in a much bigger way and new titles were introduced.

On May 31, 2023, the next transgender girl crowned by Areej Chaudhary on the soil of Pakistan was Alina Khan. Khan was known for her role in the movie Joyland.

== Titleholders ==
Year	Representative	From	Host city	Host country
2024 & 2025	TBA	TBA	Lahore	Pakistan
2023 & 2024	Alina Khan	Lahore, Punjab	Lahore	Pakistan
2021 & 2022	Shyraa Roy	Sialkot, Punjab	Lahore	Pakistan

=== Wins by province ===
Province	Titles	Years
Punjab	2	2022, 2024

== See also ==
- Sonia Ahmed
- Miss Pakistan World
- Mrs. Pakistan World
- Miss Earth Pakistan
- Miss Grand Pakistan
- Miss Pakistan Universal
