= List of Pakistani models =

This is a list of notable Pakistani models.

== Female models ==
- Aaminah Haq
- Ainy Jaffri
- Amna Ilyas
- Amna Babar
- Annie Ali Khan
- Anoushay Abbasi
- Anzhelika Tahir
- Arij Fatyma
- Ayesha Omar
- Ayyan
- Farah Shah
- Iffat Rahim
- Iman Ali
- Iqra Aziz
- Juggan Kazim
- Mariyah Moten
- Mathira
- Mawra Hocane
- Maya Ali
- Meera
- Meesha Shafi
- Mehreen Raheel
- Mehwish Hayat
- Misbah Mumtaz
- Momal Sheikh
- Mushk Kaleem
- Nadia Hussain
- Neelam Muneer
- Nida Yasir
- Noor Bukhari
- Rabia Butt
- Reema Khan
- Rubya Chaudhry
- Saba Qamar
- Sabeeka Imam
- Sadia Imam
- Sana Askari
- Sana Fakhar
- Sanam Saeed
- Sonia Ahmed
- Sumbul Iqbal
- Tooba Siddiqui
- Urwa Hocane
- Vaneeza Ahmad
- Veena Malik
- Yasmeen Ghauri
- Yumna Zaidi
- Zainab Qayyum
- Zara Abid
- Zara Sheikh
- Zeba Ali
- Zhalay Sarhadi

== Male models ==
- Abbas Jafri
- Ahmed "Ahmii" Rehman
- Aijaz Aslam
- Azfar Rehman
- Emmad Irfani
- Fahad Mustafa
- Hasnain Lehri
- Jahan-e-Khalid
- Junaid Khan
- Nauman Ijaz
- Omer Shahzad
- Rizwan Ali Jaffri
- Shahzad Noor
- Shahzad Sheikh
