= Saim Sadiq =

Pakistani filmmaker

- Born: 1991 (age 34–35); Lahore, Pakistan
- Education: Lahore University of Management Sciences (BSc); Columbia University School of the Arts (MFA)
- Occupations: Director; screenwriter
- Years active: 2019–present

Saim Sadiq is a Pakistani screenwriter and director who won the Jury Prize of the Un Certain Regard section at the 2022 Cannes Film Festival for directing the drama film Joyland, the first Pakistani film to be selected in Cannes. Joyland also won the Queer Palm award during its world premiere at Cannes.

== Biography ==
Sadiq grew up in what he describes as a "middle-class, conservative family" in Rawalpindi. He attended St Mary's Academy in Lalazar, Rawalpindi. He graduated with a BSc with honors in anthropology from the Lahore University of Management Sciences in 2014. He obtained his MFA in Screenwriting and Directing from the Columbia University School of the Arts in 2019.

Sadiq has said that his filmmaking has been inspired by his family, and by his discovery of a theater community in Lahore that is only a 10-minute ride from his childhood home.

== Work ==
His first short, Nice Talking To You, was an official selection at SXSW 2019, Palm Springs 2019, and was a BAFTA Shortlist for Best Student Film. He also won Vimeo's Best Director award at Columbia University Film Festival along with the Kodak Gold Award.

For his Columbia film school thesis, he explored the world of trans dancers in the short Darling, which won the Orizzonti Award for Best Short Film in the 76th Venice International Film Festival. It was also the first Pakistani film to screen and win an award at the Venice Film Festival and received special jury mention at SXSW and was an official selection at the 2019 Toronto International Film Festival before being acquired by Focus Features.

=== Joyland ===
Sadiq's first feature, Joyland, follows the poor and patriarchal Rana family, and the youngest son, Haider, as he gets a job as an exotic dancer and becomes entangled in an affair with his boss, Biba, the trans lead dancer. Sadiq has said that this story is not his own but "its portrayal of the patriarchy, desire and intimacy, all of which [he has] been struggling with". This film also features Sadiq's second collaboration with Alina Khan, who plays Biba, and starred in Sadiq's short Darling. Khan has praised Sadiq for his care surrounding trans representation in Joyland.

Sadiq spent almost 7 years trying to get funding for Joyland. Sadiq credits the numerous rejections of the script because, [t]here were a lot of things that were wrong," and they allowed him to refine the script and fix the issues. Sadiq also had to drastically change the script following the numerous following the passage of Pakistan's landmark transgender rights bill in 2018. According to Producer Apoorva Guru Charan, Joyland is the first Pakistani film to be made with only American funding. The film was initially banned in Pakistan, but was allowed to be shown but with heavy censorship that Sadiq describes as, "laughably random cuts and dialogue omissions" including "the shot of a platonic hug between a husband and wife." Eventually the film was shown in Pakistan, but not in the state of Punjab, where the story is set and which hosts half of Pakistan's population. Joyland had a private screening in Lahore, the capital city of Punjab, in August 2025.

Sadiq has been signed by notable talent agency CAA, following the success of Joyland. Sadiq won the Baumi Script Development Award for his script Little Men in May 2025. The script follows a Pakistani-American man living in New York that enters into a fraudulent marriage with his former lover to help her escape Pakistan. The script was written with Maggie Briggs, who also co-wrote Joyland.
