= Miss Earth Pakistan =

Pakistani beauty pageant title

- مس ارض پاکستان
- Formation: 2005
- Type: Beauty pageant
- Headquarters: Toronto; Lahore
- Location(s): Canada; Pakistan
- Members: Miss Earth
- Official language: English
- President: Sonia Ahmed
- Parent organization: Miss Pakistan World (2005–Present)
- Website: http://misspakistanworld.com/

Miss Earth Pakistan (Urdu: مس ارض پاکستان) is a national beauty pageant title presented to Pakistani delegates who participate in the Miss Earth competition.

This title was initially acquired in 2005 by the president of Miss Pakistan World, Sonia Ahmed pageant was chosen to represent Pakistan at the Miss Earth 2005 pageant held in the Philippines.

== History ==
In 2005, Pakistan made its debut at Miss Earth when Naomi Zaman, the winner of the Miss Pakistan World pageant held in Toronto, was designated by the president of Miss Pakistan World, Sonia Ahmed, to represent Pakistan in the Miss Earth pageant.

Since that inaugural participation in Miss Earth 2005, the Miss Pakistan World organization has sent a total of 12 contestants to the Miss Earth pageant. There were some years when the organization couldn't send delegates due to scheduling conflicts, as the crowning ceremony of Miss Pakistan World coincided with the Miss Earth pageant.

Regrettably, Pakistan was unable to field representatives in 2007, 2010, 2013, 2015, 2018, 2019, and 2021. Nevertheless, despite these occasional gaps, Miss Earth Pakistan successfully completed 12 years of participation in the international competition.

On October 31, 2015, the first girl who was a mixed race was crowned Miss Pakistan World, Anzhelika Tahir who went on to compete in Miss Earth 2016.

In 2020,Areej Chaudhary became the first Miss Earth Pakistan to participate directly from the soil of Pakistan to compete in Miss Earth 2020. Previously the candidates were girls who were born out of Pakistan and were part of the Overseas Pakistani Community. In 2023, Dr. Kapotaqkhy Chanchala who was crowned Miss Pakistan Universal 2023 became the second girl from Karachi, Pakistan to compete in Miss Earth 2023.

== International competition ==
The following is a list of Pakistani representatives at the Miss Earth contest.

- : Declared as Winner
- : Ended as runner-up or top 5/6 qualification
- : Ended as one of the finalists or semifinalists
- : Ended as special awards winner

Year	Province	Miss Earth Pakistan	Placement at Miss Earth	Special Awards
2025	Peshawar Khyber Pakhtunkhwa	Syeda Dua-e-Khadija	TBA	Gold Medal for Green Leaders in Action
2024	Punjab	Mehwish Butt	Unplaced	None
2023	Sindh	Dr. Kapotaqkhy Chanchala	Unplaced	None
2022	Punjab	Anniqa Jamal Iqbal	Unplaced	None
Did not compete in 2021
2020	Punjab	Areej Chaudhary	Unplaced	None
Did not compete between 2018—2019
2017	Sindh	Ramina Ashfaque	Unplaced	None
2016	Punjab	Anzhelika Tahir	Unplaced	Talent Competition Winner
Did not compete in 2015
2014	Khyber Pakhtunkhwa	Shanzay Hayat	Unplaced	Talent Competition Winner
Did not compete in 2013
2012	Punjab	Zanib Naveed	Unplaced	Silver Medal
2011	Punjab	Sanober Hussain	Unplaced	Miss Friendship
Did not compete in 2010
2009	Punjab	Ayesha Gilani	Unplaced	None
2008	Jhelum	Nosheen Idrees	Unplaced	None
Did not compete in 2007
2006	Sindh	Sehar Mahmood	Unplaced	None
2005	Punjab	Naomi Zaman	Unplaced	Miss Talent

== Gallery ==
Gallery

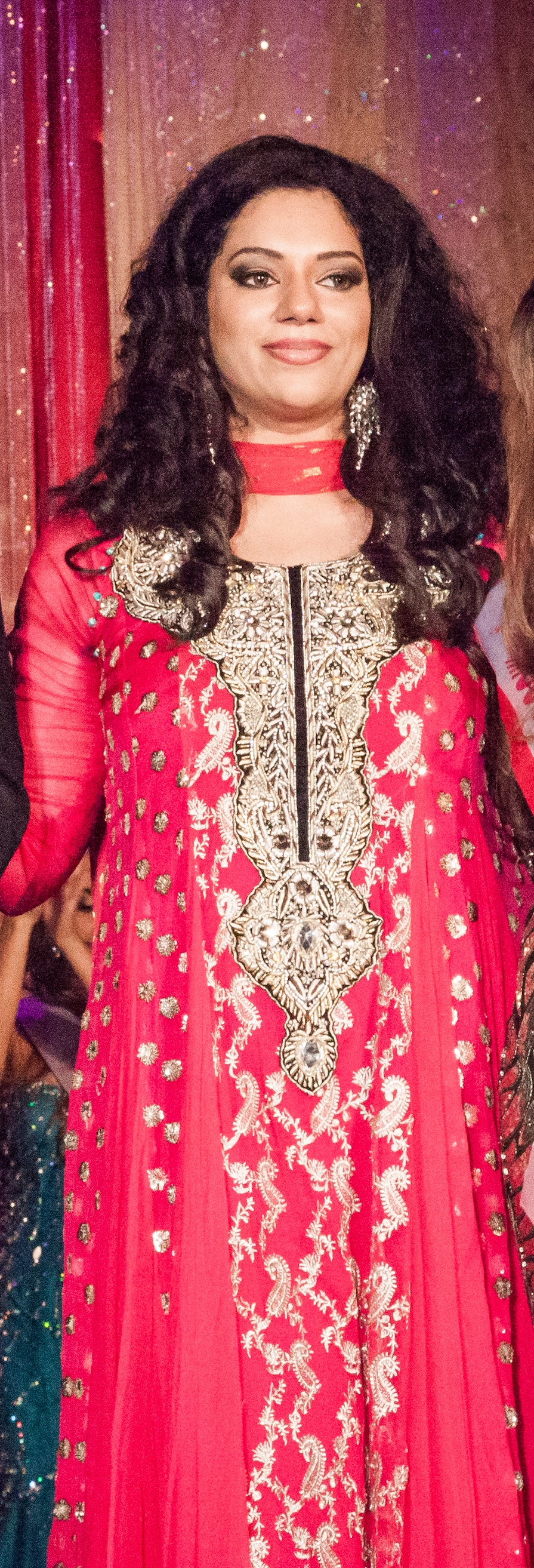
Sonia Ahmed
Miss Earth Pakistan President

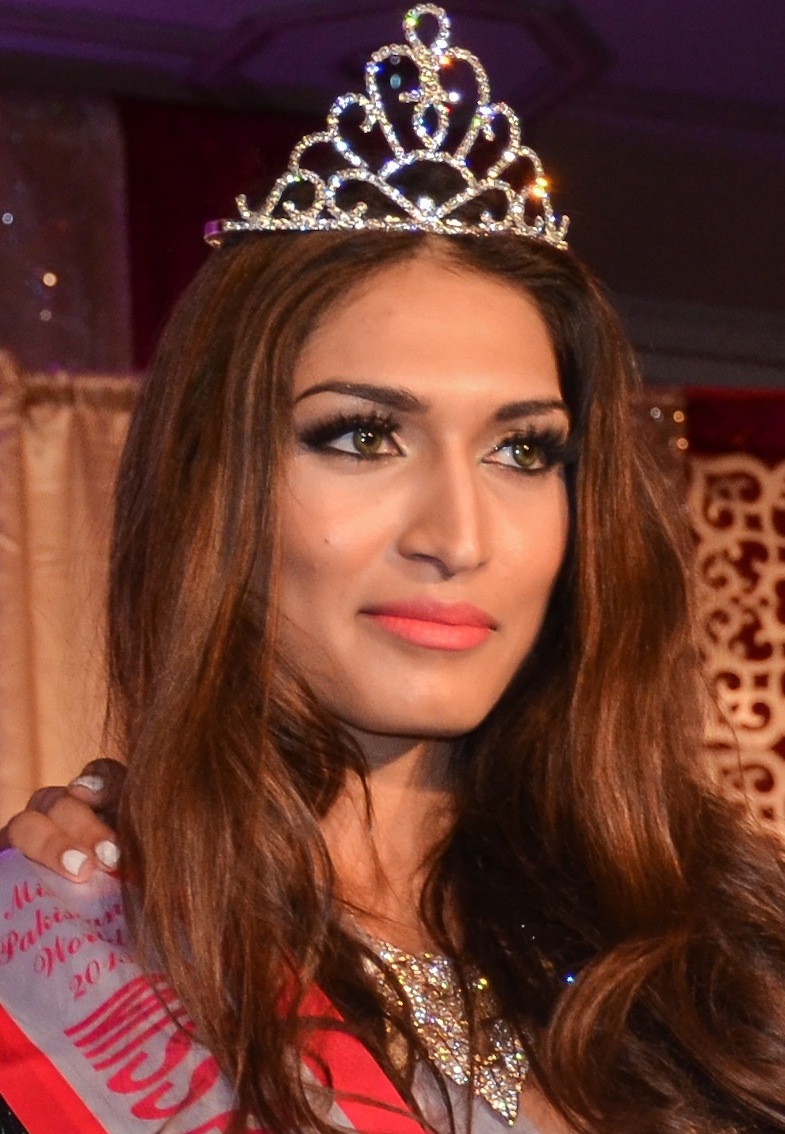
Shanzay Hayat
Miss Earth Pakistan 2014

== Controversies ==
On December 1, 2019, Miss Earth Pakistan 2012 died in a car accident. At approximately 11:40 p.m. on Sunday December 1, 2019, an incident occurred on the Inter-County Connector in Maryland involving Zanib Naveed, aged 32. Naveed was driving a 2018 Mercedes CL2 heading eastbound when she approached a curve leading to Route 1. Her vehicle collided with a curb, resulting in it overturning. Naveed was ejected from the vehicle and succumbed to her injuries at the scene. Based on a preliminary investigation, it has been determined that alcohol was not a contributing factor in the accident. Naveed was the sole occupant of the vehicle at the time of the incident.

== See also ==
- Beauty for a Cause
- Big Four international beauty pageants
- List of beauty pageants
- Miss Pakistan Universal
- Miss Grand Pakistan
- Miss Pakistan World
- Miss Trans Pakistan
- Miss Pakistan Universal
- Sonia Ahmed
