= Misbah Arshad =

Pakistani beauty pageant titleholder

- مصباح ارشد
- Born: Lahore, Pakistan
- Education: University of Hagen
- Beauty pageant titleholder
- Title: Miss Pakistan World 2023; Miss Universe Pakistan 2026
- Major competitions: Miss Pakistan World 2023; (Winner); Miss Aura International 2023; (Unplaced); Miss International 2023; (Unplaced); Miss Supranational 2024; (Unplaced); Miss Universe Pakistan 2026; (Winner); Miss Universe 2026; (TBD)

Misbah Arshad (Urdu: مصباح ارشد) is a Pakistani beauty pageant titleholder who will represent Pakistan at Miss Universe 2026. She previously competed at Miss Supranational 2024 and Miss International 2023.

== Early life and education ==
Misbah Arshad was born in Lahore, Pakistan, and previously lived in Islamabad. She is currently based in Munich and studied psychology at the University of Hagen.

== Pageantry ==
Arshad won Miss Pakistan World 2023 and went on to represent Pakistan at several international pageants, including Miss Aura International 2023 in Turkey, where she was unplaced, and Miss International 2023 in Japan, where she was also unplaced. She later competed at Miss Supranational 2024 in Poland, where she was unplaced.

She won Miss Universe Pakistan 2026 and will represent Pakistan at Miss Universe 2026 in San Juan, Puerto Rico.

Awards and achievements
Preceded by Roma Riaz	Miss Universe Pakistan; 2026	Incumbent
Preceded by Anzhelika Tahir	Miss Supranational Pakistan; 2024	Succeeded by Azqa Sohail
Preceded by –	Miss International Pakistan; 2023	Succeeded by Mia Siddique
Preceded by Shafaq Akhtar	Miss Aura Pakistan; 2023	Succeeded by Anniqa Jamal Iqbal
Preceded by Anniqa Jamal Iqbal	Miss Pakistan World; 2023	Succeeded by Wajiha Ihsan
