= Sonia Ahmed =

Founder of Miss Pakistan and Film Director (born 1980)

- سونیا احمد
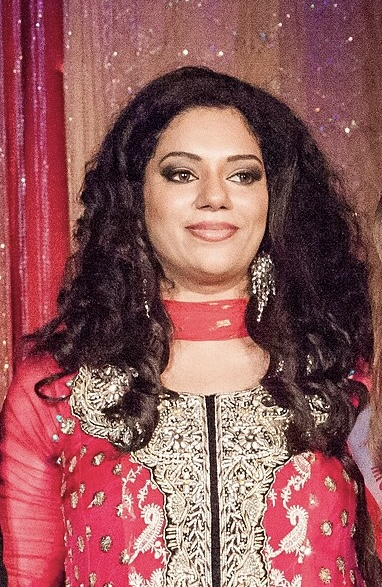
- Born: 23 August 1980 (age 46); Sharq, Kuwait
- Citizenship: Pakistan; Canada
- Education: University of Ottawa (BBA)
- Occupations: Director; Producer; Writer
- Years active: 2000–present
- Title: Founder of Pakistan's Pageant Industry; National Director Miss Pakistan World, Miss Pakistan Universal, Miss Earth Pakistan, Miss Grand Pakistan, Miss Trans Pakistan,Mrs. Pakistan World
- Website: soniaahmedofficial.com

Sonia Ahmed (Urdu: سونیا احمد) (born 23 August 1980) as Sonia Iqbal Ahmed, is a Kuwait-born Canadian Pakistani and founder of Miss Canada Pakistan Inc., now known as Miss Pakistan World, Mr. Pakistan World and Mrs. Pakistan World that were first held in 2002 in Toronto, Ontario, Canada.

She established the Miss Pakistan pageant on the soil of Pakistan in 2020 and crowned the first girl in Pakistan and in 2021, she established the Miss Trans Pakistan pageant. Since 2020, the pageant is held in Lahore, Pakistan.

== Biography ==
Sonia Ahmed was born in Kuwait to Arain Punjabi father from Lahore, Punjab and mother is from Karachi, Sindh. She spent her childhood in Kuwait and did her high school and university in Ottawa, Ontario. She graduated from the University of Ottawa. Ahmed is a certified accountant. She views herself as a patriot and progressive Pakistani working to liberate Pakistani women by opening different avenues and showcase the beauty and talent of the new Pakistani generation. She is known to create the pageant industry of Pakistan through Miss Pakistan World, Mrs. Pakistan, Miss Earth Pakistan, Miss Grand Pakistan, Miss Pakistan Universal, Ms. Pakistan, Mr. Pakistan and Miss Trans Pakistan events.

== Career ==
=== Pakistan's pageant industry ===
In 2002, Ahmed created a beauty pageant called Miss Canada Pakistan and changed its name to Miss Pakistan World in 2006. She created Mrs. Pakistan World in 2007, for married women of Pakistani descent. She created Mr. Pakistan World in 2011, and moved the event to New Jersey, USA in 2014. From 2002-2019 the Miss Pakistan pageant was held in Toronto, Ontario.

Ahmed has sent contestants to pageants like Miss Grand International, Miss Earth, Miss International, Miss Supranational and many mid level and minor competitions around the world. Her participation as the National Director of Pakistan created the pageant industry for Pakistan through Miss Pakistan World, Miss Pakistan Universal, Miss Grand Pakistan, Mrs. Pakistan World, Miss Earth Pakistan and Miss Trans Pakistan.

During Covid, the pageant was virtually brought in Lahore, Pakistan and since then has been held in Pakistan. In 2020, Ahmed, brought the pageant to Lahore, Pakistan where the first Miss Pakistan World was crowned on the soil of Pakistan, Areej Chaudhary. Since 2020, the pageant is held in Lahore, Pakistan.

Another history was made in Lahore, Pakistan on May 25, 2021. Ahmed created the first Miss Trans Pakistan for trans women of Pakistani descent and the first trans girl to be crowned was Shyraa Roy. On 31st, January 2022, the Mr. and Miss Pakistan ceremoney was held in Lahore, Pakistan and 6 winners were crowned. On May 31, 2023 along with the other winners, the second Miss Trans Pakistan was crowned, Alina Khan. This was the fourth Miss Pakistan event organized by Ahmed on the soil of Pakistan. On 31 May 2024, Ahmed went to Lahore, Pakistan and completed the 5th event on the soil of Pakistan and on 30 May 2025, Ahmed completed the 6th Mr. & Miss Pakistan Event in Lahore. On July 15, 2026, Ahmed became the national director of Miss World after 25 years.

=== Entering film work ===
In 2014, Ahmed filmed her first documentary, "I Shall Dance," under her production company, Touchgate Global Inc., which was released in September 2014 in Toronto, Ontario, Canada.

== Filmography ==
Year	Film	Credited as			Notes	Ref.
Year	Film	Director	Writer	Producer	Notes	Ref.
2014	I Shall Dance	Yes	Yes	Yes	Selected at the YellowKnife Film Festival	Feature
2024	Pakistan's Minority Queen	Yes	Yes	Yes	Post Production	Short
2024	Multan's	Yes	Yes	Yes	Documentary/ Filming	Short

== Controversies ==
Ahmed faced opposition on her holding the pageant from some conservative sections of the community. However the opposition soon ended. In August 2010, Ahmed was criticized for going ahead with the 8th annual Miss Pakistan World during the month of Ramadan and while Pakistan faced a humanitarian crisis due to widespread flooding.

== See also ==
- Miss Pakistan World
- Mrs. Pakistan World
- Miss Trans Pakistan
- Miss Earth Pakistan
- Miss Grand Pakistan
- Miss Pakistan Universal
