= Noor Xarmina =

Pakistani model and beauty pageant titleholder (born 1995)

Noor Xarmina Khattak
- Born: Noor Xarmina Khattak; 1995 (age 30–31); Islamabad, Pakistan
- Education: Imperial College London
- Alma mater: London Business School
- Occupations: Model; Actress; Consultant
- Beauty pageant titleholder
- Title: Miss Universe Pakistan 2024
- Years active: 2023 - present
- Major competitions: Miss Universe Pakistan 2024; (Winner); Miss Universe 2024; (Unplaced)

Noor Xarmina (born 1995) is a Pakistani actress, model, and beauty pageant titleholder who was crowned Miss Universe Pakistan 2024. She represented Pakistan at the Miss Universe 2024 pageant.

== Early life and education ==
Noor Xarmina was born in Islamabad, Pakistan. Due to her parents' diplomatic careers, she spent her formative years growing up in nine different countries across four continents, including the United States, South Africa, Romania, the UAE, Singapore, Canada, the UK, Portugal, and Pakistan.

She pursued higher education in London, earning a Bachelor of Science (B.S.) in Biological Sciences from Imperial College London and a Master of Science (M.S.) in Management from London Business School.

== Career ==
=== Finance and consulting ===
Before transitioning to the entertainment industry, Xarmina had a successful career in finance. She worked as a strategy consultant for KPMG in the UAE and as a visiting consultant for Salesforce. She then moved into venture capital, holding positions as an investment analyst and associate for several London-based firms, including Nauta Capital, Frog Capital, Downing Ventures, and Foresight Group. She also served as a member of the board of directors for Rated People for a year.

=== Acting and modeling ===
At the age of 28, Xarmina left her venture capital job to attend drama school in London to pursue her long-held ambition of becoming an actress. After completing her studies, she moved back to Pakistan in November 2023 to model and act full-time, working with various leading brands in Karachi and Lahore.

=== Pageantry ===
In July 2024, Xarmina was crowned Miss Universe Pakistan 2024, triumphing over 21 other candidates in a competition held in the Maldives by the Dubai-based Yugen Group. She represented Pakistan at the 73rd Miss Universe pageant in Mexico in November 2024. Her participation has been described as a groundbreaking moment for the country, aimed at challenging stereotypes and presenting a modern image of Pakistani women globally.

== Miss Universe ==
=== Miss Universe Pakistan 2024 ===
Xarmina was crowned Miss Universe Pakistan 2024, triumphing over 21 other candidates in a competition held in the Maldives by the Dubai-based Yugen Group.

=== Miss Universe 2024 ===
She represented Pakistan at the 73rd Miss Universe pageant in Mexico in November 2024.

== Advocacy and platform ==
Xarmina is a passionate advocate for social issues, with her primary platforms focusing on women's safety and climate action in Pakistan. She views her international platform as a way to enhance Pakistan's global representation and inspire strong female leadership within her home country.

Growing up globally, she embraces her diverse cultural background while remaining connected to her Pakistani roots and traditional family values. She has been praised for presenting the modern Pakistani woman on an international stage.

Awards and achievements
Preceded by Erica Robin	Miss Universe Pakistan; 2024	Succeeded by Roma Riaz
