= Aks (2018 film) =

- Film poster
- Directed by: Asif Pervez
- Written by: Asif Pervez,, Fahad Waheed
- Screenplay by: Fahad Waheed
- Produced by: Asif Pervez
- Starring: Roman Khan; Faiza Asif; Arslan Sheraz; Jyoti Dagar; Shyraa Roy; Fahad Rajpoot; Meera
- Cinematography: Asim Saadi
- Edited by: Media Virtuation Studios
- Music by: Asim Saadi
- Production companies: Roy Motion Pictures and Asim Saadi Productions
- Distributed by: Filmika pictures
- Release date: 16 February 2018
- Running time: 120 minutes
- Country: Pakistan
- Language: Urdu

Aks (Urdu: عکس) is a first Pakistani 3D horror film directed and produced by Asif Pervez. The film features Meera, Roman Khan, Faiza Asif, Arslan Sheraz, Jyoti Dagar, Shyraa Roy, Nidhi Kumar and Fahad Rajpoot.

== Plot ==
Two newly married couples go for a getaway to visit an abandoned village. Consequences start happening when they realize that the place is haunted.

== Cast ==
- Roman Khan as Rayan
- Arslan Sheraz as Daniyal
- Sarfaraz Ali Khan
- Faiza Asif as Aleesha
- Jyoti Dagar as Sophie
- Shyraa Roy as Sania
- Fahad Rajpoot as Professor Shareef
- Araj Hassan as Mr.X
- Farwa Shah as Sara Khan
- Nidhi Kumar as Zoya
- Meera as Meera (Guest appearance)

== Release ==
An earlier announcement reported that the film was stated for release in December 2017. After completing the filming, it was confirmed that it is scheduled for release in February 2018.

== Music ==
Aks

Soundtrack album by Asim Saadi
- Released: 12 March 2018
- Recorded: 2017
- Genre: Feature film soundtrack
- Language: Urdu
- Label: Zee Music Company

The music for Aks is composed by Asim Saadi while the lyrics are written by Asif. The songs are produced by Asim Saadi Studios. The full music album is expected to be released in January 2018.

No.	Title	Lyrics	Music	Singer(s)	Length
1.	"O Humnava"	Shyraa Roy	Asim Saadi	Shyraa Roy	3:24
2.	"Aks"	Shyraa roy	Asim Saadi	Bushra Barday	4:05
3.	"Raat"	Arko	Aditiya Dev	Shyraa Roy	4:43
4.	"Jeeney Laga mein"	Shyraa Roy	Asim Saadi	Jayraj Jagada and Shyraa Roy	4:13
Total length:					18:10
