= Ayyan (model) =

Pakistani model and singer

Ayyan Ali
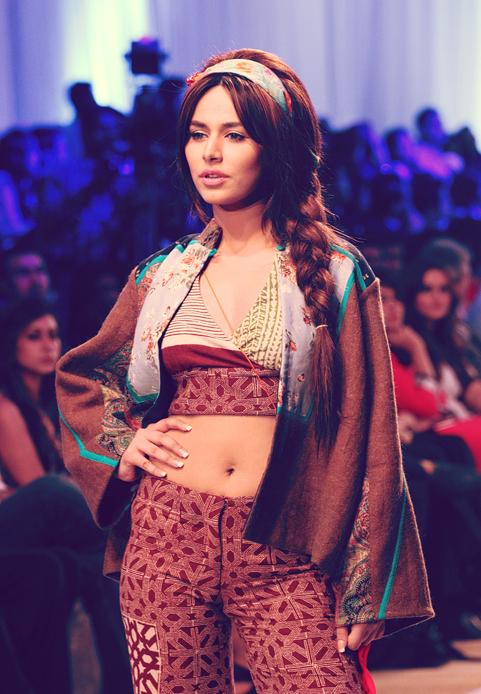
- Ayyan modeling during Fashion Week in Pakistan in 2012
- Born: Ayyan Ali; Dubai, United Arab Emirates
- Occupation: Model
- Years active: 2009 – present
- Modeling information
- Hair color: Black
- Website: ayyanworld.com

Ayyan Ali, or simply Ayyan (Urdu: ایان علی), is a Pakistani model and singer. She started modeling in 2010 and has been nominated four times for the Lux Style Awards.

== Career ==
Ayyan started her career as a model at the age of sixteen. She started modeling in 2010 and won the title of Best Female Emerging Model. She was nominated four times for the Lux Style Awards.

In 2010, Ayyan was awarded the title of Calvin Klein ‘Beauty of the Year 2010’. Later, she became their brand ambassador. That same year, she was nominated for Best Female Emerging Model for the Lux Style Awards, and in 2011 for Best Female Model. Her music video and single, titled "You and I", was released on the occasion of Eid al-Fitr in July 2014, and was panned by the critics.

== Charges and arrest ==
On 14 March 2015, the Pakistan Airports Security Force arrested Ayyan and charged her with money laundering. She was boarding a flight to the UAE from the Benazir Bhutto International Airport in Islamabad. Ayyan was off to Dubai through a private airline when the Airports Security Force (ASF) personnel checked her luggage at the counter and discovered US$506,800. She was presented before a customs judge who sent her on a fourteen-day judicial remand. She was then taken to a medical facility for examination. The $500,000 in her suitcase far exceeded the $10,000 legal limit on foreign currency that an individual can take outside Pakistan in cash in a single trip. During interrogation, she allegedly named several Pakistani politicians and models involved in money laundering. On 14 July 2015, Ayyan was released from jail on bail.

=== Murder of the Customs Inspector who caught her ===
The widow of the customs inspector who was to be the key prosecution witness in the money laundering case of Ayyan Ali stated that her husband had been killed to protect Ayyan.

== Discography ==
Singles

- "Earthquake"
- "Making Dollars" featuring Timo
- "You and I" featuring F. Charm

== Awards and nominations ==
The following are the awards and nominations for Ayyan:

Year	Award	Category	Result
2009	U.S. Consulate General ‘Women’s Day,.	Best Model	Won
2010	Lux Style Awards	Best Emerging Female Model	Nominated
2011	Lux Style Awards	Nominated	
2011	Miss Calvin Klein Beauty	Miss Calvin Klein	Won
2012	Lux Style Awards	Best Female Model	Nominated
2012	Pakistan Media Awards	Best Female Model	Won
2013	Lux Style Awards	Best Female Model	Nominated
2013	Hum Awards	Best Female Model	Won

== See also ==
- List of Pakistani models
