= Areej Chaudhary =

Pakistani Actress & Miss Pakistan World

- اریج چوہدری
- Born: 7 May 1997 (age 29); Islamabad, Pakistan
- Education: Comsat University
- Occupation: Actress
- Height: 167.64 cm (66.00 in)
- Beauty pageant titleholder
- Title: Miss Pakistan World 2020; Miss Earth Pakistan 2020; Miss Eco Pakistan 2022; Miss Global Pakistan 2022
- Years active: 2020 - present
- Major competition: Miss Pakistan World2020 Miss Earth 2020

Areej Chaudhary (Urdu: اریج چوہدری; born 7 May 1997) is a Pakistani actress and the winner of Miss Pakistan World 2020 and was sent to Miss Earth 2020 virtually to represent Pakistan. She is also a psychologist by profession.

== Early life ==
Areej Chaudhary was born on 7 May 1997 in Jeddah, Saudi Arabia. She did her schooling in Jeddah from Springhill International School and Bloomfield Hall School in Pakistan and later enrolled at Comsats University in Lahore for graduation in psychology.

Her family roots lie in Multan, Punjab and is a relative of actor-director Hamza Ali Abbasi. Her father owns translation companies in Dubai, UAE, and Qatar. Areej, the youngest of the family, has a sister and two brothers, she resides with her family in Bani Gala, Islamabad.

== Beauty pageants ==
Areej Chaudhary's pageant work started when she applied for the Miss Pakistan World pageant in 2020.

Chaudhary won the title of Miss Pakistan World in 25 August, 2020, She was the first girl who got the crown from the soil of Pakistan,

Areej Chaudhary, crowned the Pakistan World and Shyraa Roy on 25 May 2021 became the first Miss Trans Pakistan.Later was invited to the Miss Pakistan 2022 ceremony that took place in Lahore, Pakistan and crowned Miss & Mr. Pakistan Global. Chaudhary, made it to the top news of the year in 2022 in Pakistan's leading newspaper, Dawn. In 2023, she crowned Ms. Pakistan World 2023, Mrs. Pakistan World 2023 and the second Miss Trans Pakistan 2023, Alina Khan.

Chaudhary participated in Miss Earth 2020 which took place virtually due to pandemic. Where she finished unplaced.

In the year 2022, Areej represented Pakistan in the Miss Eco International 2022 competition, held in Egypt. She was the third Pakistani contestant to represents Pakistan in the Miss Eco pageant.

Areej took part in her fourth pageant and third international pageant in Miss Global 2022 which took place at Bali Nusa Dua International Convention Center in Bali, Indonesia.

== Acting career ==
Chaudhary's acting career started after she was crowned Miss Pakistan World in 2020. Her first break was the drama Maahi.

=== Pakistan industry ===
Chaudhary joined the Pakistani drama industry while she was studying in Comsats University, Lahore and known as veli girl. She has worked in dramas like Sitam aired on HUM TV where she played a negative role, She was also seen in the drama Sirat-e-Mustaqeem on ARY Digital and Oey Moti on Express Entertainment. Her first drama was Maahi on LTN family channel where she was a lead character in which she projected a positive character. She completed her first film called Dhai Chaal in March 2022 which got released in December 2023.

== Television ==
Year	Drama	Role	Channel
2021	Maahi	Maahi	LTN Family
2021	Sitam	Ramsha	HUM TV
2021	Sirat-e-Mustaqeem	Mehwish	ARY Digital
2021	Oey Moti	Natasha	Express Entertainment
2022	Inteqam	Bubbly	Geo Entertainment
2022	Woh Pagal Si	Sajjo	ARY Digital
2023	Jannat Se Aagay	Aneela	Har Pal Geo
2024	Gentleman	Journalist	Green Entertainment
2024	Kabhi Main Kabhi Tum	Natasha Salman	ARY Digital
2025	Pal Do Pal	Wafa	ARY Digital

== Filmography ==
Year	Film	Role	Notes
2021	Dhai Chaal	ZolZai	First film/ Urdu Film
2022	Aar Ya Paar	Laura Hardmeat	Punjabi Film
2023	Andkaar		Short Film
2024	Jinna Teri Marzi		Punjabi Film

== Discography ==
Album	Song	Singer
Single	"Mann Mera"	Fahad Ishfaq
Single	"Ishq"	Saieen Zahoor
Single	"Show you some Love"	Kabir Singh

Awards and achievements
Preceded by Anzhelika Tahir	Miss Eco Pakistan; 2022	Succeeded by Anniqa Jamal Iqbal
Preceded by Incumbent	Miss Global Pakistan; 2022	Succeeded by Shafina Shah
Preceded by Ramina Ashfaque	Miss Earth Pakistan; 2020	Succeeded by Anniqa Jamal Iqbal
Preceded by Arooj Bokhari	Miss Pakistan World; 2020	Succeeded by Anniqa Jamal Iqbal
