= Roma Riaz =

Pakistani beauty pageant titleholder (born 1999)

- Born: Lahore, Punjab, Pakistan
- Education: Manchester Metropolitan University
- Beauty pageant titleholder
- Title: Miss Universe Pakistan 2025
- Years active: 2025 - present
- Major competitions: Miss Universe Pakistan 2025; (Winner); Miss Universe 2025; (Unplaced)

Roma Riaz is a British-Pakistani beauty pageant titleholder who won Miss Universe Pakistan 2025 in Thailand. She represented Pakistan at the 74th Miss Universe pageant in Thailand .

== Early life and education ==
Roma Riaz was born into a Punjabi Christian family in Lahore, Pakistan, and grew up in Pakistan, Saudi Arabia, and the United Kingdom. She is based in Manchester, UK. She attended Aquinas College in Stockport, England, and has a degree in business and marketing from Manchester Metropolitan University. Professionally, she works as an assistant merchandiser for the sports fashion retailer JD Sports Fashion. Riaz has mentioned that her Christian faith is part of her life and that she prays before important events.

== Miss Universe ==
=== Miss Universe Pakistan 2025 ===
Riaz won her first pageant, Miss Universe Pakistan 2025, held in the Maldives. Her selection generated widespread conversation and some online criticism, and she used the contest to challenge conventional beauty standards and present a positive, diverse image of Pakistan. During the competition, she won the Universal Radiance title, which guaranteed her a place in the top three. She advocated against colorism and body shaming within the South Asian beauty industry.

=== Miss Universe 2025 ===
Riaz represented Pakistan at Miss Universe 2025 in Thailand on November 21, 2025. Her wardrobe choices were designed to reflect her heritage and faith, including a sari and a gown featuring a cross motif. Riaz advocated for women's empowerment, girls' education, and the representation of minority communities. She focused on dismantling colorism and body shaming prevalent in South Asian communities. She has directly addressed online trolls who criticized her skin tone and body type, stating, "I will not apologise for looking like my people".

== Charity work ==
She has collaborated with charitable organizations such as Smile Train Dubai, which supports children with cleft conditions, and aims to use her platform to improve educational access for women in rural Pakistan.

Awards and achievements
Preceded by Noor Xarmina	Miss Universe Pakistan; 2025	Succeeded by Misbah Arshad
