= Miss Universe Pakistan =

Pakistan's national beauty pageant

- Type: Women's beauty pageant
- Franchise holder: Yugen Group
- Headquarters: Dubai, United Arab Emirates
- Country represented: Pakistan
- Qualifies for: Miss Universe
- Most recent edition: 2026
- Current titleholder: Misbah Arshad; Islamabad
- Owner: Josh Yugen
- Language: English

Miss Universe Pakistan is a national beauty pageant franchise organized by the Yugen Group of Dubai, to select a representative from Pakistan for the Miss Universe pageant.

Misbah Arshad of Lahore, Punjab was declared the 4th and current Miss Universe Pakistan 2026. She has represented Pakistan at Miss Aura international 2023, Miss International 2023 and Miss Supranational 2024. She is now representing Pakistan at 75th Miss Universe in Puerto Rico.

== Editions ==
The winner of Miss Universe Pakistan represents her country at Miss Universe. On occasion, when the winner does not qualify (due to some reason) a runner-up is sent.

| Year | Winner | Runner-up | Shortlisted Contestants | Date | Venue |
|---|---|---|---|---|---|
| 2023 | Erica Robin | Jessica Zain Wilson | 5 | September 14, 2023 | Brennia Kottefaru, Maldives |
| 2024 | Noor Xarmina | Nimra Jacob | 9 | July 20, 2024 | Brennia Kottefaru, Maldives |
| 2025 | Roma Riaz | Jessica Zain Wilson | 8 | October 4, 2025 | Brennia Kottefaru, Maldives |
| 2026 | Misbah Arshad | Zara Yonus | 10 | August 19, 2026 | Philippines |

== Titleholders ==
- : Declared the winner
- : Finished as a runner-up or top 5/6 qualification
- : Finished as one of the finalists or semifinalists
- : Finished as a special awards winner

| Year | Province | Miss Universe Pakistan | Placement at Miss Universe | Special Award(s) | Ref. |
|---|---|---|---|---|---|
| 2026 | Punjab | Misbah Arshad | | | |
| 2025 | Punjab | Roma Riaz | Unplaced | | |
| 2024 | Islamabad Capital Territory | Noor Xarmina | Unplaced | | |
| 2023 | Sindh | Erica Robin | Top 20 | | |

=== Wins by province ===
| Province | Titles | Years |
|---|---|---|
| Punjab | 2 | 2025,2026 |
| Islamabad Capital Territory | 1 | 2024 |
| Sindh | 1 | 2023 |

== Trivia ==
Jessica Zain Wilson joined the beauty pageant twice. She was crowned as 1st Runner-up of Miss Universe Pakistan 2023, later she joined the pageant again in 2025, and again she got the 1st Runner-up of Miss Universe Pakistan 2025.
