= Shyraa Roy =

Pakistani singer

Shyraa Roy شاعرہ رائے
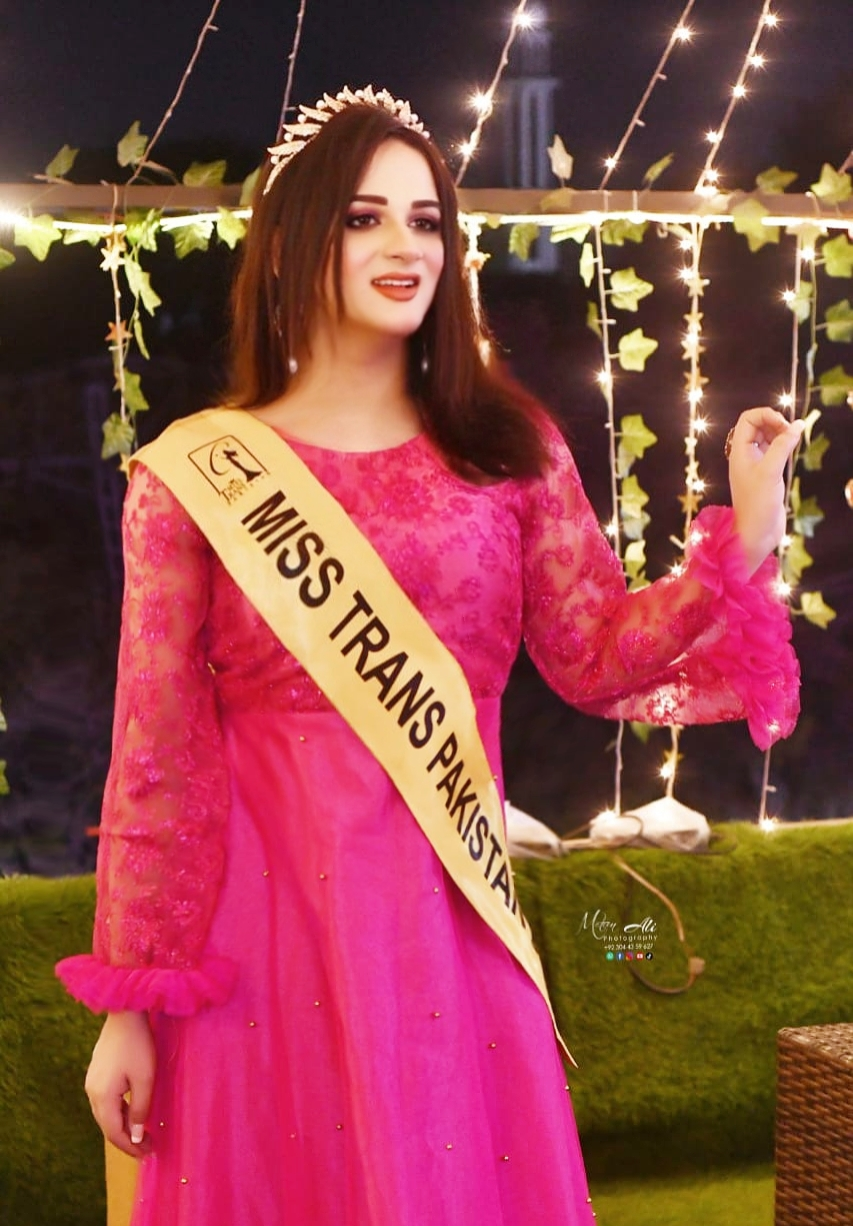
- Roy during Miss Trans Pakistan

Background information
- Born: 25 October 1999 (age 27); Sialkot, Pakistan
- Origin: Sialkot, Pakistan
- Genres: Playback singer, Pop, Fusion
- Occupations: Beauty Queen, Singer, Actress
- Years active: 2018 - present
- Labels: ARY Films, Zee Music Company
- Website: www.shyraaroy.com

Shyraa Roy (Urdu: شاعرہ رائے) is a Pakistani singer, actress and producer based in Dubai. She is known for being the first Miss Trans Pakistan for 2021 and 2022 to be crowned in Pakistan. She made her debut in cinema through Vikram Bhatt's feature film Sanak in 2023.

== Early life ==
Roy was born into a Muslim family in Sialkot, Pakistan on 25 October 1999. She is a student of Anwar Rafi, who is a student of Mohammed Rafi. On 26 September 2020 Roy revealed to independent Urdu that she is a gender dysphoric transgender woman. She was subjected to criticism and trolling over social media. On 21 February 2021, Roy released Kamli through ARY Films. She created a new trend in Pakistan through her music video release in a cinema at DHA Lahore called Duniya, where it received a theatrical premiere.

== Career ==
=== Miss Trans Pakistan ===
On 25 May 2021, Roy was crowned Miss Trans Pakistan at the Swiss Lounge in Lahore, Pakistan. This pageant was an extension to Miss Pakistan World where, in 2021, the pageant was open to trans women. She was the first trans woman to be crowned Miss Trans Pakistan. Areej Chaudhary, former Miss Pakistan World 2020, crowned the first Miss Trans Pakistan, Shyraa Roy in Pakistan. On 31 January 2022 Shyraa Roy hosted the 20th annual Miss Pakistan award ceremony in Aladdin Lounge in Lahore and crowned the newly titled Mrs. Pakistan World 2022 Nida Khan & Mr Pakistan World Ataullah Gujjar from Faisalabad in the event.

=== Music and film work ===
Shyraa is an aspiring singer and actress and has come in various different roles in movies like Aks, Mohini in Mohenjodaro and Natasha in Saaho. She sang in music singles like Raat, Kamli in 2020, meanwhile she started working in an Indian web series by Ursula Manvatkar’s Hello Shabnam. She was featured in 2021 with Pakistani singer Mohsin Abbas Haider in a duet. On 31 December 2022 Shyraa shared the first-look poster of her upcoming feature movie Sanak as a lead heroine and producer.

== Filmography ==
Key
| † | Denotes films/dramas that are not released/aired |

| Film | Title | Role | Notes |
|---|---|---|---|
| 2016 | Mohenjo Daro | Mohini | Cameo |
| 2018 | Aks | Sania | Debut film |
| 2019 | Saaho | Natasha | Uncredited cameo |
| 2020 | Street Dancer 3D | Roxen | Cameo |
| 2022 | Hello Shabnam † | Shabnam | Filming |
| 2023 | Sanak | Samaira Khan | Producer/Lead |

== Discography ==
=== Soundtracks ===
| Year | Song | Album | Composer | Co-singer |
|---|---|---|---|---|
| 2018 | "Aks Title" | Aks | Asim Saadi | Bushra Bardey |
| 2018 | "Jeeney laga" | Aks | Asim Saadi | Jayraj Jagata |
| 2019 | "Jalty Bhujty" | Ghost | Arko, Aditya Dev | |
| 2020 | "Ye Pyar ho na Khatam" | Zakhmi | Harish Sagane | Yasser Desai |

Singles

| Year | Song | Co-singer | Notes |
|---|---|---|---|
| 2019 | "Raat" | | from the album Ghost |
| 2020 | "Asmaa" | | album Shyraa Roy in quarantine |
| 2020 | "O Yaara" | | album Shyraa Roy in quarantine |
| 2020 | "Sensational Eyes" | Dapstar Amigo | composed by Jeyabarghavi |
| 2020 | "Tere Naal Pyar" | Asad Razzak | Producer for Zee Music |
| 2021 | "Kamli" | Mohsin Abbas Haider | chartbuster song released by ARY Films |
| 2021 | "Greater Suffer Sometimes" | Oscar Oghenekarg | first rap track with a Nigerian |
| 2021 | "Mahiya" | Mujahid Baig | Worked as Producer for Zee Music Company |
| 2021 | "Duniya" | Kashif Ali Babber | Produced by Roy Motion Pictures |
| 2022 | "Kareeb Ao" | | Chapter 1 - Audio Release |
| 2022 | "Dildaariya" | | Animated Music Video |
| 2022 | "Raat Reboot" | Arko | Duet version of Raat |
| 2022 | "Baarish" | | Pre-Production yet to release. |

=== Covers ===
| Year | Song |
|---|---|
| 2019 | "Tum Hi Ana" |
| 2020 | "Kaun Tujhe" |
| 2020 | "Chithi Na Koi Sandes" |
| 2021 | "Dil ko karaar Aya" |
| 2022 | "Dil" |

== Awards and nominations ==
| Year | Award | Category | Work | Result | Ref |
|---|---|---|---|---|---|
| 2020 | Pakistan International Screen Awards | Best Song | Raat (Single) | Nominated | |
| 2021 | Cannes Film Festival | Musical Short film | Kamli | Selected | |
| 2021 | International Iconic Awards | Best Singer (Female) | Singer | Nominated | |
| 2022 | 20th Anniversary Miss Pakistan | Miss Trans Pakistan | Beauty Queen | Won | |

Awards and achievements
| Preceded by INCUMBENT | Miss Trans Pakistan; 2021/2022 | Succeeded by Alina Khan |
