= Joyland (film) =

2022 Pakistani drama film

- Release poster featuring a painting by Salman Toor
- Urdu: جوائے لینڈ
- Directed by: Saim Sadiq
- Written by: Saim Sadiq; Maggie Briggs
- Produced by: Apoorva Guru Charan; Sarmad Sultan Khoosat; Sabiha Sumar; Lauren Mann
- Cinematography: Joe Saade
- Edited by: Saim Sadiq; Jasmin Tenucci
- Music by: Abdullah Siddiqui
- Production companies: All Caps; Khoosat Films; Diversity Hire Ltd.; One Two Twenty Entertainment; Blood Moon Creative; NNB Digital Media; Film Manufacturers Inc.; Astrakan AB; Noruz Films; Vidhi Films
- Distributed by: Film Constellation
- Release dates: 23 May 2022 (Cannes); 18 November 2022 (Pakistan)
- Running time: 127 minutes
- Country: Pakistan
- Languages: Punjabi; Urdu
- Box office: $1.2 million

Joyland (Urdu: جوائے لینڈ) is a 2022 Pakistani drama film, written and directed by Saim Sadiq in his feature directorial debut. The film stars Ali Junejo, Rasti Farooq, Alina Khan, Sarwat Gilani, and Salmaan Peerzada. Set in inner-city Lahore, Joyland centers around the low-income Rana family, headed by an elder patriarch (Peerzada) who yearns for the birth of a grandson. He forces his daughter-in-law Mumtaz (Farooq) to quit her job after Haider (Junejo), his youngest son and her husband, finds work at an erotic dance theater. However, complications arise when Haider becomes infatuated with Biba (Khan), a hijra dancer.

Joyland's executive producers include prominent figures Malala Yousufzai, Jemima Goldsmith, Riz Ahmed, and Ramin Bahrani among others.

Joyland had its world premiere at the Cannes Film Festival on 23 May 2022, becoming the first Pakistani film to premiere at the festival. It screened in the Un Certain Regard section, where it competed for the Caméra d'Or. It won the Jury Prize, as well as the Queer Palm for best LGBTQ-themed film. It was initially banned for theatrical release in Pakistan, but eventually approved for release after minor cuts. It premiered domestically on 18 November 2022 and received generally positive reviews from critics. Joyland was Pakistan's entry for Best International Feature Film at 95th Academy Awards, where it became the first Pakistani film to be shortlisted in the category.

== Plot ==
In inner-city Lahore, Amanullah is the elder patriarch of the middle-class Rana family. His younger son, Haider, has been unemployed for years, while Haider's wife, Mumtaz, works as an aesthetician at a salon, a job she values. Haider's friend Qaiser helps him secure work at an erotic dance theatre as a backup dancer for Biba, a hijra dancer. Haider had previously seen Biba bloodied at a hospital while his sister-in-law, Nucchi, was giving birth to her fourth daughter. When Amanullah learns that Haider has found work, he orders Mumtaz to quit, as he hopes for a grandson.

Haider joins Biba and the other dancers in rehearsals but initially lacks experience. After witnessing Biba argue with the theatre manager over an unaffordable standee of herself, Haider helps her order one. Unable to store it at the theatre, he brings it home, where he and Mumtaz place it on the roof. The following morning, family friend Fayyaz alerts Amanullah, and they condemn the standee as shameful. Meanwhile, Haider improves as a dancer.

Biba later explains that the blood Haider saw at the hospital belonged to Tina, another hijra who was shot dead in front of her. Haider and Biba discuss the ocean, which he has never seen. After nearly kissing her, Haider returns home and asks Mumtaz about the ocean; she suggests that they visit it someday. He then returns to Biba, and they kiss passionately.

While Mumtaz and Nucchi visit the amusement park Joyland, Haider performs with Biba. When the theatre loses power, he persuades them to continue dancing until the lights return, and their performance is well received. Later, Saleem, Nucchi's husband, catches Mumtaz masturbating while watching a man masturbate in an alley visible from her bathroom window. The next morning, Fayyaz's son berates the Rana family because Fayyaz had spent the night with Amanullah, which he considers disgraceful.

Mumtaz and Nucchi visit a doctor and learn that Mumtaz is pregnant with a boy. Mumtaz tells Nucchi that she feels like "running away", then dismisses the remark as a joke. At the theatre, the dancers question Haider about Biba's genitals, prompting Biba to rebuke them. Later, when Haider attempts to have sex with Biba as a receptive partner, she angrily expels him and tells him not to return. At home, Haider cries when Mumtaz tells him they are expecting a son.

After Amanullah's 70th birthday party, Mumtaz retrieves a hidden bottle from a toilet tank and drinks from it. She is later found dead. Her family, neighbours and others, including Biba, gather to pray as her body is washed, shrouded, and taken away for burial. Afterwards, Haider confronts Saleem for blaming Mumtaz for killing her unborn son. Nucchi rebukes Saleem, arguing that Mumtaz's death is the fault of the entire family.

In the past, an unmarried Haider visits Mumtaz at her home and asks whether she wants to marry him despite their marriage being arranged. They agree, with Mumtaz stipulating only that she must be allowed to work after marriage. In the present, Haider leaves Lahore to visit the ocean and wades into the water.

== Cast ==
- Ali Junejo as Haider, the youngest son of the Rana family. He finds work as a backup dancer at an erotic dance company and falls for Biba in the process.
- Alina Khan as Biba, the lead dancer of the erotic dance company. She is openly trans and is often faced with prejudice.
- Rasti Farooq as Mumtaz, the wife of Haider who is forced to stop working once he gets his job.
- Sarwat Gilani as Nucchi, the wife of Salmaan and a traditional stay at home mom to four girls.
- Salmaan Peerzada as Rana Amanullah, the oldest member and head of the family. He is widowed and lives his life in a wheelchair.
- Sohail Sameer as Saleem, the oldest son of the Rana family who is employed and a father to four girls.
- Sania Saeed as Fayyaz, an older widow who is a neighbor and friend to the Rana family.

== Themes ==
In the context of a conservative Pakistani society, Joyland is a daring cinematic intervention that skilfully explores the complex crossroads of gender, desire and sexuality. Sadiq talks about drawing inspiration from his own upbringing in a patriarchal society that led to struggles within his relationship dynamics. This is reflected in the Rana's family system, the men expected to be working and leading while the women take care of the house and children. We see Haider struggle in his masculinity in his relationship with Biba, who is a transgender woman. However, Sadiq discusses her character as being one of the leads who happens to be trans; it's not the transgender character that the film is about. He wrote Biba with the same dichotomies that he wrote the character of Mumtaz with. Joyland also brings up questions of desire and identity. Biba is comfortable with her desires, and has a strong sense of identity, where Haider lacks this completely.

== Production ==
Joyland was made with a budget of under €100,000. It was shot in the span of 6 weeks in 2021, during the global pandemic. All of production took place in the city of Lahore, Pakistan with key locations being the Mehfil Theatre, an actual erotic dance theater, and the amusement park Joyland Lahore.

== Release ==
=== Premiere and festival screenings ===
Joyland had its world premiere at the 75th Cannes Film Festival in the Un Certain Regard section on 23 May 2022. Film Constellation, a U.K. and France-based sales firm, has taken up the international rights for the film, which will be shared with WME Independent for representation in North America. French rights of the film were acquired by Condor.

The film was invited at 2022 Toronto International Film Festival in the "Special Presentations" section and was screened on 8 September 2022. It was also selected as part of the 27th Busan International Film Festival's "A Window on Asian Cinema" section, screening on 6 October 2022. Later in December, it was invited to the 28th Kolkata International Film Festival and was screened on 18 December 2022. In the same month, it was also invited to "Spotlight" section of 2023 Sundance Film Festival, held from 19 to 29 January 2023.

Joyland did not screen at the International Film Festival of Kerala, one of India's most respected film festivals. In a report for Firstpost, journalist Anna M. M. Vetticad revealed that the film was rejected by the artistic director of the festival, Deepika Suseelan, who said: "There are actually so many films dealing with the same [sic], particularly transgender if we take out, you know there is lesbian, gay, different segments ... Joyland was taking too much time." Vetticad wrote: "It is inexcusable ... for an individual in such a critical position to consider their personal opinion reason enough to reject such a film despite its cultural and socio-political significance; to be unaware of that significance and equally unaware of audience interest in it despite the crowds it has drawn at festivals across the world."

=== Theatrical release and censorship ===
Joyland was scheduled to be released in Pakistan on 18 November 2022. Despite the censor board having granted the film a censor certificate in August, Pakistan's Ministry of Information & Broadcasting was announced to have banned the film's domestic release in November, citing Pakistan's Motion Picture Ordinance of 1979 and written complaints about the film. Additionally, Senator Mushtaq Ahmad Khan of the Jamaat-e-Islami political party accused the film of being "against Pakistani values", stating that, "Glamourising transgenders in Pakistan, as well as their love affairs, is a direct attack on our beliefs."

The ban was met with harsh criticism, with the hashtag #ReleaseJoyland making rounds on social media. In an Instagram post, director Saim Sadiq wrote that he and his team were "gutted" by the ban and said it was, "absolutely unconstitutional and illegal." Alina Khan, the actress playing the protagonist of the film, said, "There's nothing against Islam and I don't understand how Islam can get endangered by mere films." In a written defense published in Variety, Nobel Prize winner Malala Yousafzai, who is also an executive producer of the film, stated:

"Joyland is not activism posing as art; it doesn't argue for a particular point of view or issue a call to action. The film treats each character with compassion... It's a film about the ways in which patriarchy hurts everyone — men, women and children...the film reflects reality for millions of ordinary Pakistanis, people who yearn for freedom and fulfilment, people who create moments of joy every day for those they love."

On 16 November 2022, an aide to Prime Minister Shehbaz Sharif told Associated Press that a committee formed to evaluate the film approved its release with minor cuts. The film premiered in Pakistan on its planned release date of 18 November, although several "objectionable erotic" scenes were subjected to censorship.

Joyland remains banned in the Punjab province. Private screenings of Joyland have been hosted in Lahore, the first in August 2025.

== Reception ==
=== Critical response ===
The film received widespread critical acclaim from international critics. It received a standing ovation at the Cannes Film Festival premiere. On the review aggregator website Rotten Tomatoes, 98% of 85 critics' reviews are positive, with an average rating of 8.2/10. The website's consensus reads: "With stunning honesty that's achingly bittersweet, Joyland tackles gender and sexual fluidity in a repressed patriarchal society with wisps of hopefulness." On Metacritic, it has a weighted average score of 82 out of 100, based on 22 critics, indicating "universal acclaim".

==== India ====
Upon the film's premiere in India, Anna M. M. Vetticad wrote on Firstpost: "In these divisive times, it is worth pondering over the many commonalities between our two countries – our failings included – as are reflected in this wonderfully sensitive chronicle of friendship and love, longing and loneliness, sexuality, desire, enforced gender roles, and the everydayness behind which prejudice, repression and oppression thrive." Vetticad added that, "In contrast to the cacophony of tyranny and persecution accompanying Haider, Mumtaz and Biba's journey, the film [...] runs as smoothly as a symphony in motion."

Siddhant Adlakha of IndieWire gave the film a grade of "B+", writing, "The frame moves slowly, if at all, but it always brims with physical and emotional energy; there’s always something in the ether, whether embodied by dazzling displays of light as characters move across stages and club floors or by breathtaking silences."

Film critic Anupama Chopra praised the performances of the film's cast, writing, "The actors - Ali Junejo, Salmaan Peerzada, Sarwat Gilani, Sania Saeed, and Alina Khan - deliver emotionally resonant performances." Chopra concluded, "With poetry and abiding melancholy, Joyland creates a poignant portrait of a splintered family". Shubhra Gupta of The Indian Express found Joyland "heartwarming".

==== International ====
Lovia Gyarkye of The Hollywood Reporter called Joyland a "family saga, one that [the director] Sadiq uses to observe how gender norms constrict, and then asphyxiate, individuals". Gyarkye concluded that the film is "an aching consideration of gender and sexuality."

Deadline Hollywood's Anna Smith opined that the film "has a vivid sense of place, created not so much by its geographical backdrop as its characters", and wrote that it "remains a thoughtful, well performed and engrossing drama set in a culture that's shifting, and not always with ease."

Allan Hunter of Screen Daily wrote, "Sadiq's screenplay navigates a complex web of secrets and lies, pressures and prejudices to create a soulful human drama intent on challenging narrow minds." Arguing that the film offers "no real villains here beyond a society that imposes rigid expectations on individuals and genders", Hunter writes that "liberation carries a hefty price in Joyland, especially for the women," further adding that "Sadiq's engaging, thought-provoking film is fully aware of the sacrifices made and the struggles that still lie ahead."

Film critic Jason Gorber, reviewing at the film at Cannes festival, wrote, "Expect this to be an absolute breakthrough from this year's Cannes 2022 with enormous international attention." Gorber called the film "profound and powerful", and one that "upends all expectation of cinema from that often closed culture, one that brashly looks at love, family, longing in its myriad forms.

Variety's Guy Lodge found the film "tartly funny and plungingly sad in equal measure," and opined that, "as a tale of transgender desire in a Muslim country, its very premise makes it a boundary-breaker." Appreciating the director, Lodge wrote, "Sadiq's debut impresses with its sensitive storytelling and vibrant visuals."

== Accolades ==
Award	Date of ceremony	Category	Recipient(s)	Result	Ref(s)
Asia Pacific Screen Awards	11 November 2022	Young Cinema Award	Saim Sadiq	Won	
Asian Film Awards	12 March 2023	Best New Director	Saim Sadiq	Nominated	
Cannes Film Festival	27 May 2022	Un Certain Regard Award	Saim Sadiq	Nominated	
Cannes Film Festival	27 May 2022	Caméra d'Or	Saim Sadiq	Nominated	
Cannes Film Festival	27 May 2022	Un Certain Regard Jury Prize	Saim Sadiq	Won	
Cannes Film Festival	27 May 2022	Queer Palm	Saim Sadiq	Won	
Cleveland International Film Festival	1 April 2023	New Direction Award	Joyland	Won	
Independent Spirit Awards	4 March 2023	Best International Film	Joyland	Won	
Indian Film Festival of Melbourne	16 August 2022	Best Film From The Subcontinent	Joyland	Won	
London Film Festival	16 October 2022	Sutherland Award	Joyland	Nominated	
London Film Festival	16 October 2022	Sutherland Award Honourable Mention	Joyland	Won	
Lux Style Awards	6 October 2023	Best Film (Viewers' Choice)	Joyland	Nominated	
Lux Style Awards	6 October 2023	Best Film (Critics' Choice)	Joyland	Nominated	
Lux Style Awards	6 October 2023	Best Film Actor of the Year Female	Alina Khan	Nominated	
Lux Style Awards	6 October 2023	Best Film Director of the Year	Saim Sadiq	Nominated	
Palm Springs International Film Festival	16 January 2023	Best International Feature Film	Joyland	Nominated	
Palm Springs International Film Festival	16 January 2023	Best Actor in an International Feature Film	Ali Junejo	Won	
GLAAD Media Awards	14 March 2024	Outstanding Film – Limited Release	Joyland	Nominated	

== See also ==
- List of Pakistani films of 2022
- List of submissions to the 95th Academy Awards for Best International Feature Film
- List of Pakistani submissions for the Academy Award for Best International Feature Film
