= Erica Robin =

Pakistani beauty pageant titleholder

- Born: 8 November 1998 (age 27); Karachi, Sindh, Pakistan
- Occupation: Model-Actress
- Beauty pageant titleholder
- Title: Miss Universe Pakistan 2023
- Major competitions: Miss Universe Pakistan 2023; (Winner); Miss Universe 2023; (Top 20)

Erica Robin (Urdu: ایریکا رابن, pronounced [ɛːriːkaː ɾaːbɪn]) is a Pakistani beauty pageant titleholder, who won the inaugural Miss Universe Pakistan in 2023. She represented Pakistan at Miss Universe 2023, and reached the top 20.She represented Pakistan at Cannes Film festival, in France in 2024

== Personal life ==
Erica Robin was born on in Karachi, Sindh, into a Christian family. She works as a model in Pakistan.

== Miss Universe ==
=== Miss Universe Pakistan 2023 ===
Robin won Miss Universe Pakistan at the inaugural contest at the Brennia Kottefaru resort, Raa Atoll, Maldives.

=== Miss Universe 2023 ===
As the winner of Miss Universe Pakistan 2023, Robin competed in Miss Universe 2023, in El Salvador, where she reached the top 20.

=== Cannes Film Festival ===
In May 2024, Robin represented Pakistan at Cannes Film Festival.

Awards and achievements
Preceded by Inaugural	Miss Universe Pakistan; 2023	Succeeded by Noor Xarmina
