= Asian-American Network Against Abuse of Human Rights =

ANAA Logo

The Asian-American Network Against Abuse of Human Rights (ANAA) is a volunteer-run organization with the purpose of increasing awareness about gender apartheid and gendercide that is occurring in Pakistan. It received national media attention for its involvement in inviting Mukhtar Mai to the United States.

== Vision ==
According to ANAA's website:

ANAA's vision is of a progressive and enlightened Pakistan where there is no room for discrimination and injustice. ANAA believes in justice for all, gender equality, and human rights for all as enshrined in the principles of Universal Declaration of Human Rights, CEDAW - The Convention on the Elimination of all forms of Discrimination Against Women and all other charters, covenants and protocols of the United Nations Organization on human rights. ANAA envisions its work to expand beyond Pakistan to include all of South Asia in the future.

== Mission ==
ANAA's stated mission is to:

1. To increase awareness about the existence of human rights abuses in Pakistan by educating Pakistanis and the international community about the existing discriminatory laws and practices in Pakistan.
2. To initiate public debate about the means to eradicate discrimination and social injustice against women, minorities and other disenfranchised groups in Pakistan through organization of educational seminars and conferences designed to increase awareness
3. To help improve the human rights situation in Pakistan, an integral concern for the international community through collaboration with national and international groups engaged in the promotion of human rights in Pakistan
4. And to expose the legal, social and psychological obstacles, ostracism and alienation faced by victims of sexual violence in Pakistan and to confront the issue of sexual violence against women through publication of newsletters, research reports and public seminars.

ANAA members are known to organize demonstrations and to urge Pakistan's government to defend the rights of women against all kinds of abuse in Pakistan.
