= Alina Khan =

Pakistani transgender actress

- Born: Lahore, Pakistan
- Occupation: Actress
- Years active: 2019–present
- Notable work: Darling (2019); Joyland (2022)
- Beauty pageant titleholder
- Title: Miss Trans Pakistan
- Major competition: Miss Trans Pakistan 2023

Alina Khan (Urdu: علینہ خان) is a Pakistani actress known for her lead roles in the short film Darling in 2019 and the feature film Joyland in 2022. She is the first transgender person to have a lead role in a major Pakistani film. In May 2023, she was crowned Miss Trans Pakistan 2023 in Lahore, Pakistan.

== Early life and career ==
Khan was born into a Muslim family in Lahore, Pakistan. She has described facing societal discrimination due to being transgender, and how after being contacted by an NGO in Pakistan, she auditioned and won a lead role in the film Darling, which won the Orizzonti Award for Best Short Film at the Venice Film Festival and had global distribution rights sold to Focus Features. According to Aiman Rizvi, writing for Dawn about Darling, "The crux of the story is perhaps best encapsulated in the words of the lead actress, Alina Khan, a trans woman who describes her personal struggle in the industry, 'I've always wanted to act in movies, since I was a child. But then I'd ask myself, how are they going to cast me? As a man, or a woman?'"

Khan has also appeared in the short film Happy Marriage, as well as commercials, a music video by Ali Sethi, and on the television show Good Morning Zindgi. In 2018, she performed as a dancer at the Naaz Theatre in Lahore.

== Joyland ==
Khan made her debut at the 75th Cannes Film Festival in the role of Biba in Joyland, the first Pakistani feature film screened at Cannes, and "the first major Pakistani motion picture to feature a trans actor in a lead role", according to The Guardian. Khan, the director, and other cast members were present during the Cannes screening where they received a standing ovation that lasted almost ten minutes. Siddhant Adlakha writes in a review for IndieWire that in the film, Khan "has an immediately commanding presence — when she walks into a room, she makes it hers" and "as Biba grows closer to Haider, inadvertently threatening what little footing he has left as a man in society's eyes, a deep vulnerability begins to emerge, which Khan wields with precision."

In November 2022, after the film was approved to be shown, the Pakistan Ministry of Information & Broadcasting banned Joyland from national distribution, in response to complaints about its subject matter, including from the Jamaat-e-Islami party. In response to the ban, Khan told The Guardian, "I've been very sad. There's nothing against Islam and I don't understand how Islam can get endangered by mere films." The ban was reversed on November 16, clearing the way for domestic screenings of the film.

== Miss Trans Pakistan ==
On 31 May 2023, Khan was crowned Miss Trans Pakistan 2023 in a ceremony held in Lahore, Pakistan. Khan commented to the media, "The feeling of being crowned in front of my Trans community is a very great feeling because it gives us a voice through this platform to represent ourselves." Sonia Ahmed began the Miss Trans Pakistan pageant in 2021 where Shyraa Roy got the title previously; it is the first pageant for trans women in Pakistan with an opportunity for the winner to represent Pakistan at international pageants.

== Filmography ==
Year	Film	Role	Notes	Ref.
2019	Darling	Alina	Orizzonti Award for Best Short Film, 76th Venice Film Festival	
2022	Joyland	Biba	Jury Prize in the Un Certain Regard category and Queer Palme award, 75th Cannes Film Festival	

== Love Interests ==
1. Samarth Kakarla

Awards and achievements
Preceded by Shyraa Roy	Miss Trans Pakistan; 2023/2024	Succeeded by To Be Announced
