= Miss Grand Pakistan =

Pakistani beauty pageant title

- مس گرینڈ پاکستان
- Formation: 2013
- Type: Beauty pageant
- Headquarters: Dubai
- Location: United Arab Emirates
- Members: Miss Grand International
- Official language: English
- Parent organization: Miss Pakistan World (2013–2014); Miss Bangladesh US Organization (2021–2022, 2024); Yugen Group (2026-Present)

Miss Grand Pakistan (Urdu: مس گرینڈ پاکستان) is a national beauty pageant title awarded to Pakistan representatives competing at the Miss Grand International contest. The title was first mentioned in 2013 when the winner of Miss Pakistan World 2013 was assigned to represent the country at the inaugural edition of Miss Grand International in Thailand, and was placed among the top 20 finalists, which was also considered the highest and only placement obtained by Pakistani candidates at the mentioned international tournament.

Since the establishment of Miss Grand International, Pakistan participated only four times; in 2013 – 2014 and 2021–2022, and all of its representatives are Overseas Pakistanis.

== History ==
Pakistan debuted at Miss Grand International in 2013 when the winner of a Pakistani Toronto-based pageant Miss Pakistan World, Shanzay Hayat, was assigned by the director Sonia Ahmed to represent Pakistan at the Miss Grand International 2013 pageant in Thailand, and she managed to be placed among the final-20 candidates. The following representative, Laila Khan Niazi, was also appointed; no national pageant was held specifically to select the Miss Grand titleholder.

After six consecutive years of absence from 2016 to 2020, the license of Miss Grand Pakistan for 2021–2024 was purchased by Hiam Amani Hafizuddin, founder of an Illinois-based Bangladeshi pageant, Miss Bangladesh US. During such a period, Hiam was also the licensee of Miss Grand Bangladesh; however, all Pakistani and Bangladeshi representatives sent by her were appointed.

Gallery

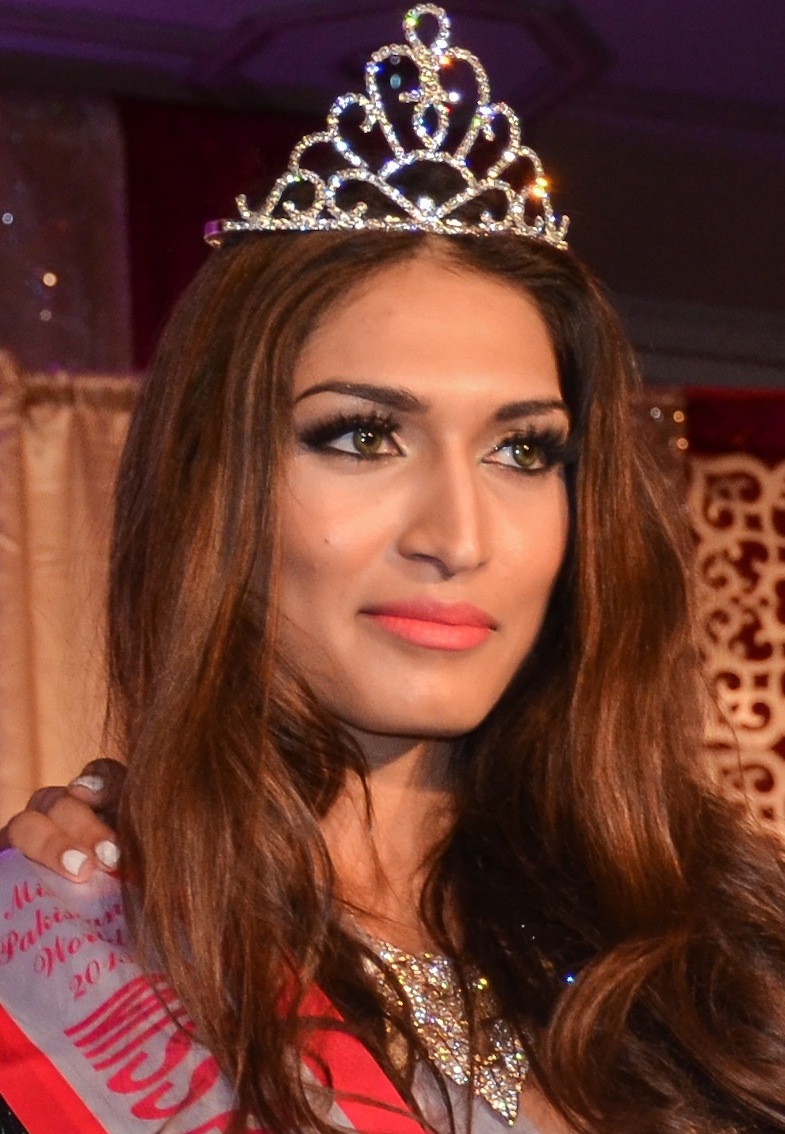
Shanzay Hayat
Miss Grand Pakistan 2013

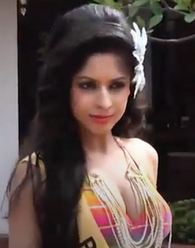
Laila Khan
Miss Grand Pakistan 2014

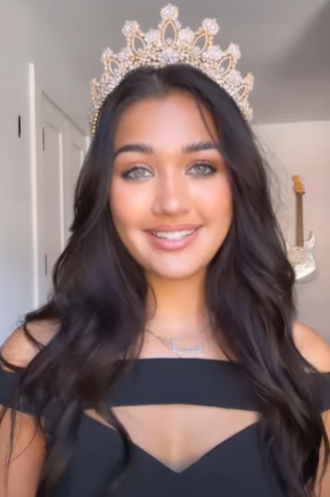
Aneesa Sheikh
Miss Grand Pakistan 2022

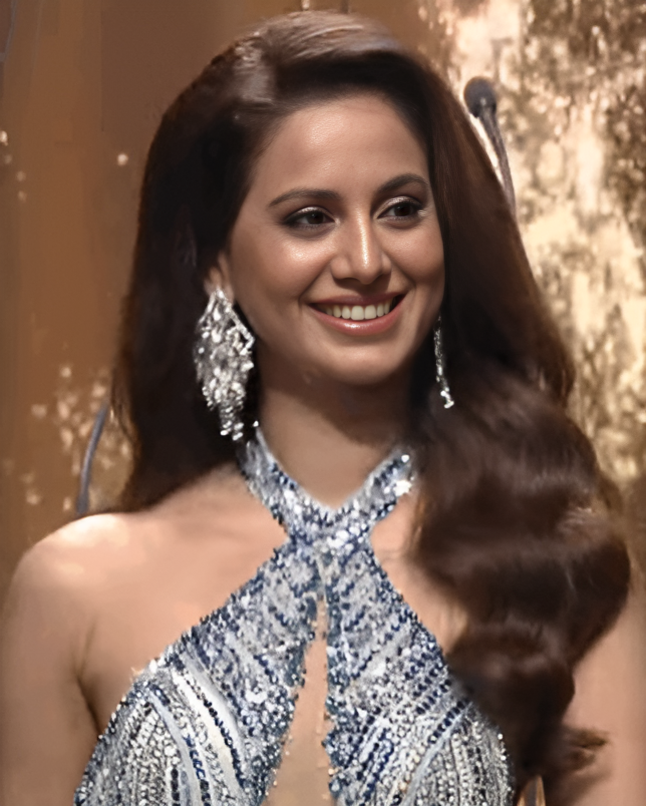
Roma Michael
Miss Grand Pakistan 2024

== International competition ==
The following is a list of Pakistani representatives at the Miss Grand International contest.

Year	Representative	Original national title	Competition Performance		National director
Year	Representative	Original national title	Placement	Other award(s)	National director
2013	Shanzay Hayat	Miss Pakistan World 2013	Top 20	—	Sonia Ahmed
2014	Laila Khan Niazi	Appointed	Unplaced	—	Sonia Ahmed
No representatives between 2015–2020
2021	Ramina Ashfaque	Miss Pakistan World 2016	Unplaced	—	Hiam Amani
2022	Aneesa Sheikh	Appointed	Unplaced	—	Hiam Amani
2023	No representative				
2024	Roma Michael	Appointed	Unplaced	—	Hiam Amani
2025	No representative				
2026	Zara Youns	Miss Universe Pakistan 1st Runner-Up			
