= Anzhelika Tahir =

Pakistani-Ukrainian beauty queen and Lollywood actress

- Born: Anzhelika Rublevska; 5 January 1994 (age 31); Kyiv, Ukraine
- Occupation: Actress
- Height: 5'9 (175cm)
- Beauty pageant titleholder
- Title: Miss Pakistan World 2015 (Winner); Miss Supertalent 2015 (2nd runner-up); World Miss University 2016 (2nd runner-up) (Miss Talent); Miss Earth 2016 (Unplaced) (Gold Medal in Talent); Miss Eco International 2017 (1st Runner-up); Exquisite Face of the Universe 2017 (2nd runner-up); Miss Supranational 2018 (Top 20)

Anzhelika Rublevska Tahir (Ukrainian: Анжеліка Рублевська Тахір; born 5 January 1994) is a Pakistani-Ukrainian actress, model and beauty pageant titleholder. She was crowned Miss Pakistan World 2015 and represented Pakistan at Miss Earth 2016. In 2016, she entered the Pakistani film industry.

== Career ==
=== Beauty pageants ===
Tahir was born in Kyiv, Ukraine to a Pakistani father and a Ukrainian mother. Her father was from Sheikupura, in Punjab, Pakistan. She is the first Pakistani of mixed descent to win the title of Miss Pakistan World. She grew up in Ukraine. After graduating from the Lyceum, she began studies Fashion design at the Kyiv National University of Technologies and Design.

Tahir won Miss Pakistan World 2015 on 31 October 2015, in Toronto, Canada. She also won Miss Perfect and Miss Popularity. She then went to compete in World Miss University and was second runner-up. She went to Korea to compete in Miss Supertalent 2016 and was second runner-up again. Tahir then competed as Miss Earth Pakistan 2016 in Miss Earth 2016 2016 and won gold medal for the talent round. She went on to compete in Miss Eco International 2017 in Cairo, Egypt and was first runner-up and finally competed in Face of the Universe and was second runner-up.

=== Acting ===
Tahir was in a Lollywood movie, Na Band Na Baraati, which starred Mikaal Zulfiqar, Ali Kazmi and Qavi Khan. This was her first movie in Pakistan's film industry and she has signed her next film to be shot in Dubai.

Tahir, became the second Pakistani actress and pageant queen to walk the red carpet at the 2018 Cannes Film Festival, as the Brand Ambassador of Miss Pakistan World.

== Filmography ==
Year	Film	Role	Language
2018	Na Band Na Baraati	Aisha	Urdu

== Discography ==
Album/Film	Song	Music	Label	Released
Single Track	"Mahiya"	Pav Dharia	Sony India	2021

Awards and achievements
Preceded by Shanzay Hayat	Miss Earth Pakistan; 2016	Succeeded by Ramina Ashfaque
Preceded by Aatka Feroz	Miss Pakistan World; 2015	Succeeded by Ramina Ashfaque
