= Miss Teen =

List of teen beauty pageants:

- Miss Teen International (Americas) (1966–present)
- Miss Teen Intercontinental (1973–present)
- Miss Teenager World (1990–present)
- Miss Teen World (2001–present)
- Miss Teen Earth (2012–present)
- Teen Universe International (2012–present)
- Miss Teen Africa (2014-present)
- Miss Teen International (India) (2018–present)
- Miss Teen Universe (Ecuador) (2003–present)
- Miss Teen Universe (United States) (2019–present)
- Miss Teen Supranational (2018–present)
- Miss Eco Teen (2018–present)
- Miss Teen Grand International (2023–present)
- Miss Teen Icon International (2024–present)
