= Miss Teen Ecuador =

National beauty pageant in Ecuador

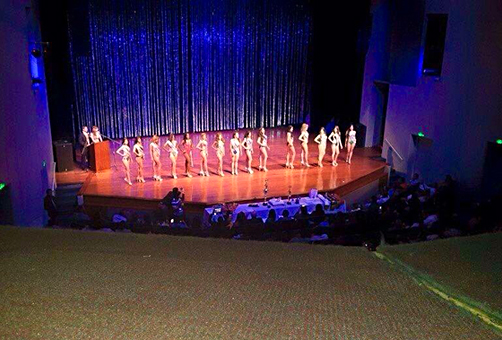
- Formation: 1966; 60 years ago
- Founder: César Montecé
- Type: Beauty pageant
- Headquarters: Guayaquil
- Location: Ecuador
- Members: Miss Teen International (1966 - present); Miss Teenager World (1971 - present); Miss Teen Intercontinental (1974 - present); Miss Teen World (2001 - present); Miss Teen Universe (2003 - present); Miss Teen Earth (2012 - present); Miss Teen Supranational (2018 - present)
- President: Rodrigo Moreira (2012-present)
- Key people: Joselin Benalcázar
- Website: missteenecuador.com

Miss Teen Ecuador is a national beauty pageant in Ecuador that began in 1966.

The pageant selects Miss Teen Ecuador, Miss Teenager Ecuador and representatives of Ecuador to international competitions.

Miss Teen Ecuador has a long history producing recognized international competitions inside and outside the country.

The contest is produced and organized by Rodrigo Moreira, who promotes the values of Ecuadorian women through an awareness-raising campaign among contestants for the benefit of children and adolescents with cancer treated at SOLCA.

== History ==
=== 20th century ===
Miss Teen Ecuador emerged as a preliminary event to select the representative of Ecuador in the International Teen Princess competition in 1966.

In 1974, Zoila Villagran Salazar of Manabí was crowned as the first Miss Teenage and represented at Miss Teenage Intercontinental.

In 1975, Yela Denise Klein moved on to the top 8 of Miss Teenage Intercontinental held in the Grand Salon, Americana Hotel, in Oranjestad, Aruba.

In 1981, Gisella Puertas Del Barco competed in the last edition of Miss Teen Intercontinental held at the Aparta Hotel Golf in Barranquilla, Colombia.

The Miss Teen Intercontinental contest based in Aruba directed only teens were allowed to compete was renamed Miss Intercontinental in 1982.

The contest under the direction of Cesar Montece changed officially its name to Miss Teen Ecuador in 1990. Alicia Álvarez representing Guayas became the first Miss Teen Ecuador winner in Guayaquil City, Ecuador. C. J. Arosemena Monroy, a former President of the Republic of Ecuador was present during the pageant coronation night.

=== 21st century ===
Cesar Montece died in 2010, and his sister, Rosa, succeeded as chairwoman of the Queen of Ecuador company.

In 2012, the Queen of Ecuador Inc. company sold all the rights of the contest to Rodrigo Moreira.

The Miss Teen Ecuador pageant celebrated its 25th anniversary at the Teatro Centro de Arte on April 18, 2015.

Miss Teen Ecuador is one of the most important beauty pageants in Ecuador.

== Titleholders ==
This is a list of women who have won the Miss Teen Ecuador beauty pageant.

Key

- Triple winners for 25th Anniversary

Year	Miss Teen Ecuador	Province
1966	Yudafin Saab	Guayas
1974	Zoila Angelita Villagran Salazar	Manabí
1975	Yela Denise Klein Loffredo	Guayas
1976	Ana Isabel Zea Medina	Guayas
1977	Mabel Adelaida Ceballos Sangster	Guayas
1978	María Fernanda Insua Romero	Guayas
1980	Sandra Patricia Zea Medina	Guayas
1981	Gisella María Puertas del Barco	Guayas
1990	Alicia Álvarez	Guayas
1993	Mildred Rivas Asang	Guayas
1994	Geraldine Vásquez	Esmeraldas
1995	Johana Noguera Ludeña	Pichincha
1996	Linda Jazmin Suárez Gómez	Guayas
1997	Andrea Elizabeth Cazar Villacís	Imbabura
1998	Tamara de Lourdes Hidalgo Zapata	Guayas
1999	María Agustina Loor Murillo	Manabí
2000	Tahíz Andrea Panus Jiménez	Guayas
2001	Johanna Real Carrera	Guayas
2002	Karen Macías Zambrano	Manabí
2003	Daniela Villacrés Cuadrado	Tungurahua
2004	Yalitza Alcívar Montecé	Guayas
2005	Ximena Valarezo Alvarado	El Oro
2006	Evelyn Ayora Estrada	Guayas
2007	Lisbeth Carolina Plúa Gutiérrez	Manabí
2008	María Fernanda Carchi Rodríguez	Guayas
2009	Sonia Alvarado Aguilera	Los Ríos
2010	Karen Viteri Flores	Santo Domingo
2011	Andrea Donoso Vélez	Guayas
2012	Angie Larrea Barzola	Guayas
2013	Andrea Ojeda Fernández	Guayas
2014	Odalis Villacrés Báez	Guayas
2015	Lessie Giler Sánchez; Débora Zamora Ramírez; Daniela Cepeda Matamoros	Manabí; Guayas; Guayas
2016	Camila Montenegro Castro	Tungurahua
2017	María de los Ángeles Guillén Aguirre	Guayas
2018	Franshesca Carvallo Rodríguez	Loja
2019	Evelyn Morocho Ocaña	El Oro
2020	Yarixa Marcillo Castillo	Santo Domingo
2021	Nayeli Zurita Fierro	Guayas
2022	Frany Delgado Quintero	Esmeraldas

This is a list of women who have won the Miss Teenager Ecuador title.

Year	Miss Teenager Ecuador	Province Represented
2015	Angie Larrea Barzola	Guayas
2016	Melissa Mite Mendoza	Santa Elena
2017	Alisson Flores Lozano	Santo Domingo
2018	Athina Centanaro Paredes	Guayas
2019	TBA	TBA

=== Representatives at Miss Teen Universe ===
This is a list of women who competed at the Miss Teen Universe beauty pageant.

Key

- Declared as Winner
- Ended as Runner-up
- Ended as one of the Finalists or Semi-finalists

Year	Miss Teen Ecuador	Province	Placement	Special Awards
2016	Camila Montenegro	Tungurahua	2nd. Runner Up	Best in Interview
2017	María Guillén	Guayas	3rd. Runner Up	Miss Photogenic
2019	Evelyn Morocho	El Oro	Top 10	Best Smile
2024	Doménica Morán	Manabí	Winner	Best National Costume

=== Representatives at Miss Teen World ===
This is a list of women who competed at the Miss Teen World beauty pageant.

Key

- Declared as Winner
- Ended as runner-up

Year	Miss Teen World Ecuador	Province	Placement	Special Awards
2003	Daniela Villacrés Cuadrado	Tungurahua	4th Runner-Up	
2005	Andrea Chávez	Guayas	1st. Runner-Up	
2008	Iliana Gallardo García	Tungurahua	Winner	
2010	Nicole Cevallos Correa	Guayas	Unplaced	
2018	María Eduarda Guzmán	El Oro	Winner	
2021	Niurka Piza Guerrero	Manabí	3rd Runner-Up	
2022	Melissa Núñez Fernández	Guayas	Unplaced	
2023	Aitana Lara Calle	Los Ríos	2nd Runner-Up	

=== Representatives at Miss Teenager World ===
This is a list of women who competed at the Miss Teenager World beauty pageant.

Key

- Declared as Winner
- Ended as Runner-up
- Ended as one of the Finalists or Semi-finalists

Year	Miss Teen Ecuador	Province	Placement	Special Awards
1999	María Agustina Loor Murillo	Manabí	4th Runner-Up	
2014	Odalis Villacrés	Guayas	2nd Runner-Up	Best Catwalk
2015	Angie Larrea	Guayas	Winner	Best in Long Gown

=== Representatives at Miss Teen Earth ===
This is a list of women who competed at the Miss Teen Earth International beauty pageant.

Key

- Declared as Winner
- Ended as runner-up

Year	Miss Teen Earth Ecuador	Province	Placement	Special Awards
2012	Ma. del Cisne Rivera	Guayas	Winner	Best in Long Gown
2013	Iris Carvallo	Loja	2nd Runner-Up	Best in Long Gown
2014	Débora Zamora	Guayas	3rd Runner-Up	Best in Long Gown
2015	Daniela Cepeda	Guayas	Winner	Best in Long Gown
2016	Sayra León	Guayas	2nd Runner-Up	Best in Long Gown
2017	Joselyn Suárez	Guayas	Top 7	Miss Photogenic
2018	Bibian Carrion	Guayas	Unplaced	
2019	Sara Varas	Guayas	Top 7	Best National Costume
2020	Evelyn Cartagena	Guayas	Winner	
2021	Valeska Pazmiño	Guayas	Unplaced	
2023	Danna Soto Crow	Guayas	2nd Runner-Up	Best National Costume

=== Representatives at Miss Teen International ===
This is a list of women who competed at the Miss Teen International beauty pageant.

Key

- Declared as Winner
- Ended as Runner-up
- Ended as one of the Finalists or Semi-finalists

Year	Miss Teen International Ecuador	Province	Placement	Special Awards
2002	Patricia Molina	Imbabura	Unplaced	Best National Costume
2003	Kimberly Gort Cabrera		Unplaced	Best National Costume
2007	Gianna María Haro Vallaza	Guayas	Unplaced	Best National Costume
2008	Flor Violeta Quirola	El Oro	Semi-finalist	
2009	Renata Moreira Tortorelli	Santo Domingo	2nd Runner-Up	
2010	Barbara Fernandes Sabaté	Guayas	Unplaced	
2017	Melissa Mite Mendoza	Guayas	1st Runner-Up	
2018	Alisson Flores Lozano	Santo Domingo	1st Runner-Up	
2019	María Guillén Aguirre	Guayas	3rd Runner Up	
2020	María Grazzia Oviedo	Tungurahua	didn't compete^{1}	
2021	Alexis Calderón	Guayas	2nd. Runner Up	
2022	Caesy Rivadeneira Chávez	Galápagos	1st. Runner Up	Best National Costume
2023	Ailen Santana	Guayas	1st. Runner Up	

^{1}The Miss Teen International organization based in Ecuador not held any competitions due to COVID-19. Judging of the competition took place outside of the normal pageant environment due to the global restrictions on public events and international travel imposed by the COVID-19 pandemic. The winner was crowned in a live-streamed event.

=== Representatives at Miss Teen Intercontinental ===
This is a list of women who competed at the Miss Teen Intercontinental beauty pageant.

Key

- Declared as Winner
- Ended as Runner-up
- Ended as one of the Finalists or Semi-finalists

Year	Miss Teen Intercontinental Ecuador	Province	Placement	Special Awards
2007	Lisbeth Plúa Gutiérrez	Manabí	Winner	
2010	Brigitte Salazar Llerena	Guayas	Winner	
2012	Jennifer Ochoa Samaniego	Guayas	Winner	
2017	Melissa Mite Mendoza	Guayas	Unplaced	
2018	Alisson Flores Lozano	Santo Domingo	Unplaced	
2019	María Guillén Aguirre	Guayas	2nd. Runner Up	
2021	Nayeli Zurita Fierro	Guayas	Winner	Best National Costume
2022	Thalia Valverde Romero	Guayas	2nd. Runner Up	
2023	Ashlee Mariscal	Guayas	1st. Runner Up	

=== Representatives at Miss Teen Supranational ===
This is a list of women who competed at the Miss Teen Supranational beauty pageant.

Key

- Declared as Winner
- Ended as runner-up

Year	Miss Teen Supranational Ecuador	Province	Placement	Special Awards
2019	Nadia Palma De Santis	Los Ríos	4th Runner Up	
2021	Yormi Montenegro Montoya	Esmeraldas	Unplaced	
2022	Frany Delgado Quintero	Esmeraldas	Winner	Best National Costume
2023	Smirnova Peñafiel	Guayas	2nd Runner Up	Best National Costume

== Major beauty pageants ==
Miss Teen Ecuador winners and runners-up in the world's major beauty contests.

Year	Miss Universe	Miss Earth
1978	Mabel Ceballos Sangster; Miss Ecuador Universo 1978; Ecuador	Est. in 2001 - Manila, Philippines
2017	Daniela Cepeda; Miss Ecuador Universo 2017; Ecuador	Lessie Giler; Miss Earth Ecuador 2017; Ecuador

== See also ==
- Miss Teen Earth
- Miss Teenager World
