= Miss Teen Universe =

Miss Teen Universe may refer to:

- Miss Teen Universe (Ecuador), an international beauty pageant for girls aged 14–19
