= Aurora Villalobos =

Mexican model and beauty pageant titleholder

- Born: Aurora Jiménez Villalobos; September 14, 2002 (age 24); Ocotlán, Mexico
- Occupation: Model
- Height: 1.76 m (5 ft 9 in)
- Beauty pageant titleholder
- Hair color: Brown
- Eye color: Brown
- Major competitions: Miss Teen Mexico International 2021 (Winner); Miss Teen International 2021 (Winner)

Aurora Jiménez Villalobos (born September 14, 2002) is a Mexican beauty pageant titleholder who was crowned as Miss Teen Mexico International 2021 and Miss Teen International 2021 in Guayaquil, Ecuador.

== Pageantry ==
=== Miss Teen Earth Mexico 2021 ===
She participated in the contest Miss Teen Earth Mexico 2021 where she won the Miss Teen Mexico International title.

=== Miss Teen International 2021 ===
Aurora, who stands 5 ft 9 in (1.75 m) tall, was crowned Miss Teen International, on October 23, 2021.

== See also ==
- Rodrigo Moreira

Awards and achievements
Preceded by (Panama) Maria Alejandra Royo	Miss Teen International; 2021	Succeeded by (South Africa) Yulienke Jacobs
