= Maria Alejandra Royo =

Panamanian model and beauty pageant titleholder

María Alejandra Royo
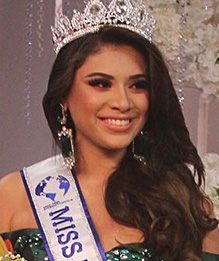
- Maria Alejandra Royo crowned as Miss Teen International in 2020
- Born: María Alejandra Royo Díaz; April 19, 2001 (age 25); Panama City, Panama
- Occupation: Model
- Height: 1.72 m (5 ft 8 in)
- Beauty pageant titleholder
- Hair color: Black
- Eye color: Brown
- Major competitions: Miss Teen Panama International 2019 (Winner); Miss Teen International 2020 (Winner)

María Alejandra Royo Díaz (born April 19, 2001) is a Panamanian beauty pageant titleholder who was crowned as Miss Teen Panama International 2019 and Miss Teen International 2020. She is the first Panamanian to win the Miss Teen International title.

== Pageantry ==
=== Miss Teen Panamá 2019 ===
She participated in the contest Miss Teen Panamá 2019 where she won the Miss Teen Panama International title.

=== Miss Teen International 2020 ===
Royo, who stands 5 ft 9 in (1.75 m) tall, was crowned Miss Teen International by Rodrigo Moreira, on December 9, 2020.

== See also ==
- Rodrigo Moreira

Awards and achievements
| Preceded by (Peru) Luciana Begazo | Miss Teen International; 2020 | Succeeded by (Mexico) Aurora Villalobos |
| Preceded by Hillary Ortega | Miss Teen Panama International; 2020 | Succeeded by |
