= María del Cisne Rivera =

Ecuadorian model

- Born: María del Cisne Rivera Álvarez; April 27, 1996 (age 30); Cuenca, Ecuador
- Height: 1.70 m (5 ft 7 in)
- Beauty pageant titleholder
- Hair color: Brown
- Eye color: Hazel
- Major competitions: Miss Teen Earth Ecuador 2012 (Winner); Miss Teen Earth 2012 (Winner)

María del Cisne Rivera Álvarez (born April 27, 1996, in Cuenca) is an Ecuadorian model, winner of the Miss Teen Earth 2012.

== Miss Teen Earth 2012 ==
After winning the Señorita Festejos 2012 title in Bucay, Ecuador, Rivera was crowned Miss Teen Americas Ecuador 2012 at the Grand Hotel Guayaquil, chosen by Rodrigo Moreira.

She travelled El Salvador to represent Ecuador and won the Best National Costume.

Rivera was chosen as the first Miss Teen Earth Ecuador and she earned the right to represent her country Ecuador in the Miss Teen Earth pageant.

She was crowned Miss Teen Earth on September 15 in Guayaquil, Ecuador, where seventeen contestants from all over the world took part in the competition. She wore a white evening gown with Swarovski crystals, which was hand-embroidered.

== Charity work ==
She cooperates to several charity foundations and street children in her community.

== See also ==
- Rodrigo Moreira
