= Miss Teen Universe (Ecuador) =

International beauty pageant based in Ecuador

- Type: International women's beauty pageant
- Parent organization: Queen of Ecuador
- Headquarters: Guayaquil, Ecuador
- First edition: 2003
- Most recent edition: 2025
- Current titleholder: Valentina Padilla; Costa Rica
- Founder: César Montecé
- President and owner: Rodrigo Moreira
- Language: English and Spanish
- Website: www.missteenuniverse.org

Miss Teen Universe is an international beauty pageant for girls aged 14–19, featuring contestants from various countries and territories. That was established in 2003 by Cesar Montece, its founder, and is currently operated by Ecuadorian businessman Rodrigo Moreira, who holds the intellectual property rights to the Miss Teen and Miss Teen Universe brands in the Republic of Ecuador. Under Moreira’s leadership, the organization aims to connect young women worldwide and promote positive community impact through philanthropic initiatives and anti-bullying campaigns.

The current Miss Teen Universe is Valentina Padilla from Alajuela, Costa Rica, who was crowned on November 30, 2025, at Casa Andina Select in Chiclayo, Peru. The pageant was originally scheduled to take place in Lima, but was later moved to Chiclayo after Peru's President José Jerí declared a state of emergency in the capital.

== History ==
The pageant was founded in Guayaquil, Ecuador on 11 February 2003 by César Montecé, president of the Queen of Ecuador company. Montecé, who passed away in 2010, was an Ecuadorian businessman and pageant director known for organizing national and international beauty pageants, including the Miss Teen World pageant, which he founded in 2001.

After a hiatus of more than a decade, the pageant was revived in 2024 under the direction of Rodrigo Moreira, who holds the intellectual property rights associated with a family of marks, including Miss Teen Earth, Miss Teen International, among others. The 2024 edition was won by Doménica Morán of Ecuador and the competition was subsequently held in 2025.

== Eligibility criteria ==
Sex	Female
Age range	14 to 19
Marital status	Single
Height	At least 1.60 metres / 5'2"
Skills	Communication skills, modelling experience
Additional attributes	Photogenic, pleasing personality, friendly

== Recent titleholders ==
Edition	Titleholder	Country	Age (Note: Ages at the time of the pageant.)	Venue	Ref.
2025	Valentina Padilla Gonzalez	Costa Rica	14	Chiclayo, Peru (Note: Originally scheduled to be held in Lima, Peru, but was moved to Chiclayo due to state of emergency.)	
2024	Domenica Moran Mendoza	Ecuador	18	Lima, Peru	
