= Renata Moreira =

Ecuadorian beauty pageant titleholder (born 1991)

- Born: Evelyn Renata Moreira Tortorelli; November 26, 1991 (age 34)
- Height: 1.72 m (5 ft 7 1/2 in)
- Beauty pageant titleholder
- Title: Reina de Santo Domingo 2008; Reina de Mi Tierra 2008; Miss Teen International Ecuador 2009; Miss Italia Nel Mondo Ecuador 2011
- Hair color: Blonde
- Eye color: Green
- Major competitions: Reina de Santo Domingo 2008 (Winner); Reina de Mi Tierra 2008 (Winner); Miss Ecuador 2009 (Best Figure) (Best Face); Miss Teen International 2009 (2nd Runner-up); Miss Italia Nel Mondo 2011 (Top 6)

Renata Moreira Tortorelli (26 November 1991) is an Ecuadorian beauty pageant titleholder who was crowned Miss Italia Nel Mondo Ecuador 2011 and will represent her country in the 2011 Miss Italia Nel Mondo pageant.

== Personal life ==
Born to an Ecuadorian father and an Italian mother. Moreira is studying commerce, and speaks Spanish, English and Italian.

== Miss Ecuador 2009 ==
Prior to her participation in Miss Ecuador 2009, Renata was Reina de Santo Domingo 2009 and Reina de Mi Tierra 2009, triumph that allows her to compete in Miss Ecuador the next year, where she won Best Fegure and Best Face awards.

== Miss Teen International 2009 ==
Moreira, who stands 1.72 m (5 ft 7 1/2 in) tall, competed as the representative of Ecuador in Miss Teen International in Costa Rica, where she was 2nd Runner-up.

== Miss Italia Nel Mondo 2011 ==
Moreira Tortorelli, as an Italian descendant, competed in the national pageant of Miss Italia Nel Mondo where she won the title. On July 4, 2011 she competed in Miss Italia Nel Mondo where she finished on top 6.

Awards and achievements
Preceded by Paola Amoretti	Miss Italia Nel Mondo Ecuador; 2011	Succeeded by María José Maza
