= Luciana Begazo =

Peruvian model and beauty pageant titleholder

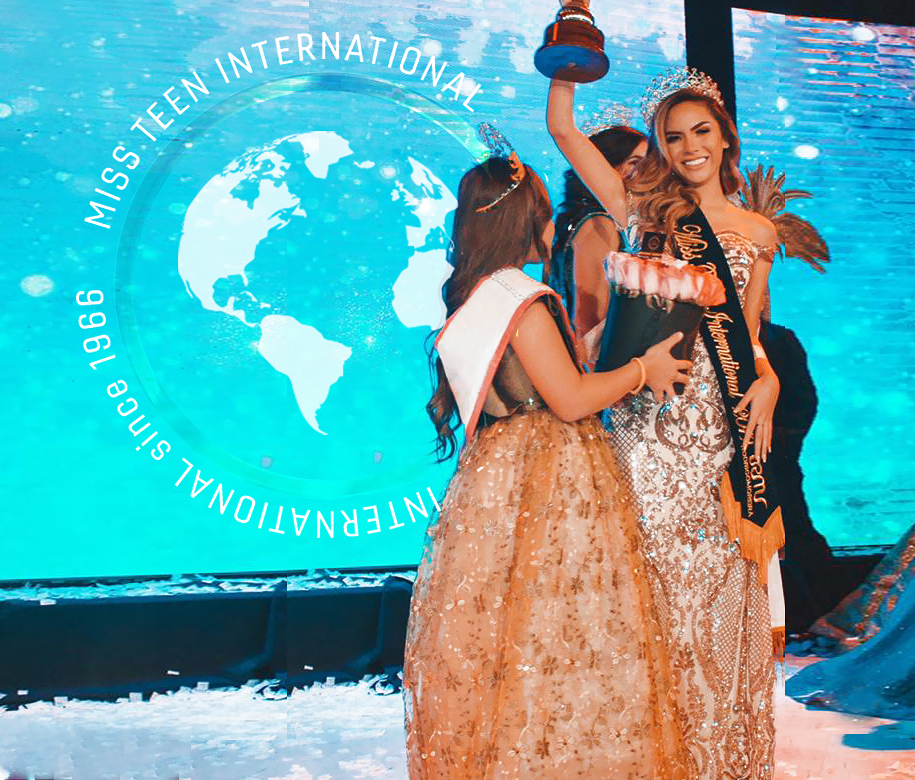
- Pictured winning Miss Teen International in 2019
- Born: Luciana Begazo Medina; August 4, 1999 (age 27); Camaná, Peru
- Occupation: Model
- Height: 1.75 m (5 ft 9 in)
- Beauty pageant titleholder
- Hair color: Brown
- Eye color: Hazel
- Major competitions: Miss Teen Arequipa 2018 (Winner); Miss Teen Peru International 2019 (Winner); Miss Teen International 2019 (Winner)

Luciana Begazo Medina (born August 4, 1999, in Camaná, Peru) is a Peruvian model and beauty pageant titleholder who was crowned Miss Teen International 2019 in Ecuador. She is the first Peruvian to win the Miss Teen International title.

== Pageantry ==
=== Miss Teen Peru 2018 ===
As Miss Teen Arequipa, she competed in the Miss Teen Peru contest where she won the Miss Teen Peru International title.

=== Miss Teen International 2019 ===
Begazo, who stands 5 ft 9 in (1.75 m) tall, was crowned Miss Teen International, on July 20, 2019, in Guayaquil, Ecuador.

== See also ==
- Rodrigo Moreira

Awards and achievements
| Preceded by (Brazil) Julia Hemza | Miss Teen International; 2019 | Succeeded by (Panama) Maria Alejandra Royo |
| Preceded by Luren Márquez | Miss Teen Peru International; 2019 | Succeeded by Catherine Castillo |
