= Lauryn Eagle =

Australian boxer (born 1987)

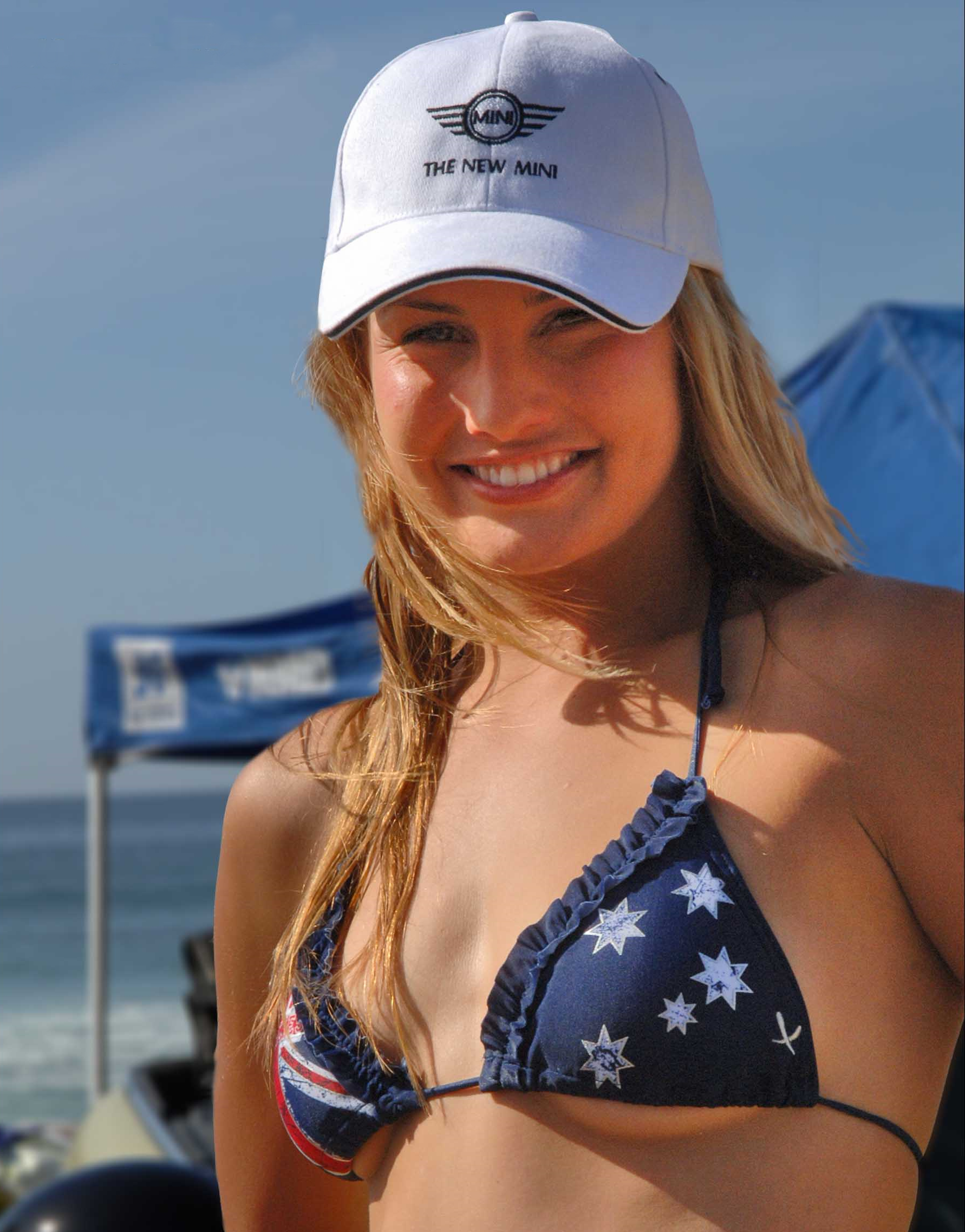
- Eagle in 2010

Personal information
- Nationality: Australian
- Born: 11 December 1987 (age 38) Randwick, New South Wales
- Height: 1.74 m (5 ft 9 in)
- Weight: Lightweight; Super featherweight

Boxing career
- Stance: Orthodox

Boxing record
- Total fights: 20
- Wins: 15
- Win by KO: 7
- Losses: 4
- Draws: 1
- No contests: 0

Lauryn Eagle (born 11 December 1987) is an Australian professional boxer and water skiing champion. She was a contestant on the reality television show The Celebrity Apprentice Australia and is a former Miss Teen International 2004.

== Early life ==
Eagle was born in Randwick, New South Wales, the daughter of Peter and Kerrie Eagle. Eagle was from a water skiing family: both her parents were skiers, her father Peter was a 10-time Australian water-skiing champion, and her sister Sarah was placed second at the 2007 World Championships. Eagle first learnt to ski when she was four years old, and started racing at the age of nine. When she was 20 years old, Eagle's father died when his speedboat flipped and crashed in Sydney Harbour on the way to the Superboat Grand Prix.

== Water skiing ==
In 2003, Eagle came second in the Junior Division and at the next World Championships in 2005 she won the women's division title in the F2 class. In 2006, she won the Australian Speed Championships (U/19) and the Australian Marathon Championships (U/19). She then finished third at the 2007 World Championship in May in the Formula 1 Division. She retired shortly from racing after her father's death in 2008. In 2009 Lauryn returned to racing, placing third at the 2009 World Championships and, after suffering a big fall in the third race, seventh in the 2011 World Championships.

== Professional boxing career ==
Eagle took up boxing and, upon turning professional in 2010, she went 2–0–1 with one knockout that year; in 2011 she suffered two split-decision losses.

On 13 July 2012, she defeated Kiangsak Sithsaithong (then 9–0–0 4KO) by a 5th-round TKO to win the World Boxing Foundation women's super featherweight title, improving her record to 3–2–1 2 knockouts.

The match was widely criticised within the boxing media. Commentators pointed out that Eagle had not fought more than six rounds in her career and had not won a fight since 2010. It was also noted that Sithsaithong's record was almost entirely against debut fighters in Thai villages.

In September 2012, Eagle participated in a promotional fight against Fox FM radio presenter Matt Tilley in a 'Champ vs Chump' promotion. Eagle won the three-round fight by a TKO in the third round. Two days later Eagle fought New Zealand's Nicki Bigwood as an undercard to former professional rugby league footballer Solomon Haumono's fight, winning in a unanimous decision in a six-round bout.

On 30 January 2013 she won the vacant Australia female lightweight title beating Nadine Brown on points at the Sydney Entertainment Centre.

== Modeling and media ==
Eagle also has a keen interest in modelling. In 2005, she competed in Miss Teen Australia in Darwin and won the title along with Miss Congeniality. She then went to Costa Rica in Central America and competed in Miss Teen International and made a clean sweep, winning Miss Teen International, along with Most Photogenic, Miss Congeniality and Best Silhouette.

In 2006, she won the FHM Lara Croft Challenge, involving physical challenges of shooting, running, ropes, ladders, 4-wheel driving and swimming.

She starred in the second season of The Celebrity Apprentice Australia, in which she lasted until the final episode, where she finished fourth.

In the August edition of Maxim magazine, Eagle featured on the front cover and a photo shoot.

== Professional boxing record ==
23 fights	18 wins	4 losses
By knockout	10	0
By decision	8	4
Draws	1	

No.	Result	Record	Opponent	Type	Round, time	Date	Location	Notes
23	Win		Supawadee Kabounram	KO		2017-07-08	WA Italian Club, Perth	
22	Win		Flora Machela	TKO		2016-12-16	Emporium Function Centre, Bankstown	
21	Win		Preeya Intaraklan	KO		2016-09-02	Emporium Function Centre, Bankstown	
20	Win		Lee Dittmar	UD		2016-06-03	Emporium Function Centre, Bankstown	vacant Australia Female Super Featherweight Title
19	Win		Alicia Pestana	UD		2016-05-07	WA Italian Club, Perth	
18	Win		Wachiraya Chamnankit	KO		2016-03-05	City Hall, Hobart	
17	Win		Kewarin Boonme	TKO		2016-02-19	Entertainment Centre, Hurstville	
16	Win			TKO		2015-06-13	Entertainment Centre, Hurstville	
15	Win		Samon Khunurat	TKO		2015-02-20	Entertainment Centre, Hurstville	
14	Win		Pantiwa Kaewmahosod	UD		2014-08-29	WA Italian Club, Perth	
13	Loss		Shari Ranger	UD		2014-02-19	Horden Pavilion, Moore Park	
12	Win		Nicki Bigwood	SD		2013-11-16	Claudelands Arena, Hamilton	
11	Win		Nicki Bigwood	UD		2013-09-27	RSL Club, Dubbo	
10	Win		Nadine Brown	UD		2013-01-30	Entertainment Centre, Sydney	vacant Australia Female Lightweight Title
9	Loss		Daniella Smith	UD		2012-12-15	The Trusts Arena, Auckland	
8	Win		Jenny Cavanagh	TKO		2012-10-14	Gold Coast Turf Club, Bundall	
7	Win		Nicki Bigwood	UD		2012-09-07	The Melbourne Pavilion, Flemington	
6	Win		Griangsupa Rodploy	TKO		2012-07-13	The Melbourne Pavilion, Flemington	vacant World Boxing Foundation Female Super Featherweight Title
5	Loss		Malin Morgan	SD		2011-04-29	Roundhouse, Uni of NSW, Kensington	
4	Loss		Bronwyn Wylie	SD		2011-03-04	The Melbourne Pavilion, Flemington	
3	Draw		Eileen Forrest	Draw		2010-11-25	The Cube, Campbelltown, Sydney	
2	Win		Christina Tai	UD		2010-10-31	Olympic Park Sports Centre, Homebush	
1	Win	1–0	Kay Hodgson	UD	4	2010-03-31	Le Montage, Lilyfield, New South Wales, Australia	Professional Debut

Sporting positions
Preceded by Janine Doherty	2005; World Water Skiing Championship; Female Formula 2 champion	Succeeded by Tania Teelow
Preceded by Vacant	WBFo Female Super Featherweight; Boxing champion 13 July 2012 – 14 July 2013	Succeeded by Vacant
Preceded by Vacant	Australian Female Lightweight; Boxing champion 30 January 2013 – present	Succeeded by incumbent
