= List of Australian female boxing champions =

This list of Australian female boxing champions is a table showing the female boxers who have won the Australian professional championship. The title has been administered by the Australian National Boxing Federation since 2002. A champion will often voluntarily relinquish the title in order to fight for a higher-ranked championship, such as the world. Where the date on which a champion relinquished the title is unclear.

== Middleweight ==
| Name | Beginning of Reign | Title | Opponent |
|---|---|---|---|
| Tayla Harris | 10 March 2018 | Australian National Boxing Federation | Aimee Addis |

== Super-welterweight ==
| Name | Beginning of Reign | Title | Opponent |
|---|---|---|---|
| Millicent Agboegbulem | 25 March 2023 | Australian National Boxing Federation | Desley Robinson |
| Deanha Hobbs | 22 September 2018 | Australian National Boxing Federation | Aimee Addis |

== Welterweight ==
| Name | Beginning of Reign | Title | Opponent |
|---|---|---|---|
| Kylie Hutt | 22 September 2018 | Australian National Boxing Federation | Sarah Dwyer |

== Super-lightweight ==
| Name | Beginning of Reign | Title | Opponent |
|---|---|---|---|
| Diana Prazak | 9 August 2011 | Australian National Boxing Federation | Malin Morgan |
| Deanha Hobbs | 13 December 2017 | Australian National Boxing Federation | Sarah Dwyer |

== Lightweight ==
| Name | Beginning of Reign | Title | Opponent |
|---|---|---|---|
| Lauryn Eagle | 6 May 2013 | Australian National Boxing Federation | Nadine Brown |
| Sabrina Ostowari | 6 May 2013 | Australian National Boxing Federation | Arlene Blencowe |

== Super-featherweight ==
| Name | Beginning of Reign | Title | Opponent | Defences |
|---|---|---|---|---|
| Lauryn Eagle | 10 September 2016 | Australian National Boxing Federation | Lee Dittmar | |

== Featherweight ==
| Name | Beginning of Reign | Title | Opponent | Defences |
|---|---|---|---|---|
| Kori Farr | 10 September 2016 | Australian National Boxing Federation | Julie Gaston | 1 |

== Super-bantamweight ==
| Name | Beginning of Reign | Title | Opponent |
|---|---|---|---|
| Susie Ramadan | 13 December 2008 | Australian National Boxing Federation | Edith Smith |
| Lee Dittmar | 19 May 2016 | Australian National Boxing Federation | April Adams |
| April Adams | 19 May 2017 | Australian National Boxing Federation | Carol Earl |
| April Adams | 19 May 2017 | Australian National Boxing Federation | Kori Farr |
| Shannon O'Connell | 19 May 2020 | Australian National Boxing Federation | Kylie Fulmer |

== Bantamweight ==
| Name | Beginning of Reign | Title | Opponent |
|---|---|---|---|
| Julie Gaston | 1 September 2011 | Australian National Boxing Federation | Edith Smith |
| Sylvia Scharper | 1 September 2014 | Australian National Boxing Federation | Kori Farr |

== Super-flyweight ==
| Name | Beginning of Reign | Title | Opponent |
|---|---|---|---|
| Pauline O'Hello | 5 November 2002 | Australian National Boxing Federation | Edith Smith |
| Edith Smith | 5 November 2003 | Australian National Boxing Federation | Nicole Cubillo |
| Jasmine Parr | 5 November 2021 | Australian National Boxing Federation | Nicila Costello |

== See also ==
- List of New Zealand female boxing champions
- List of Australian heavyweight boxing champions
- List of Australian cruiserweight boxing champions
- List of Australian light heavyweight boxing champions
- List of Australian super middleweight boxing champions
- List of Australian middleweight boxing champions
- List of Australian super welterweight boxing champions
- List of Australian welterweight boxing champions
- List of Australian super lightweight boxing champions
- List of Australian lightweight boxing champions
- List of Australian super featherweight boxing champions
- List of Australian featherweight boxing champions
- List of Australian bantamweight boxing champions
- Boxing in Australia
