= Denisse Robles =

Ecuadorian economist and politician

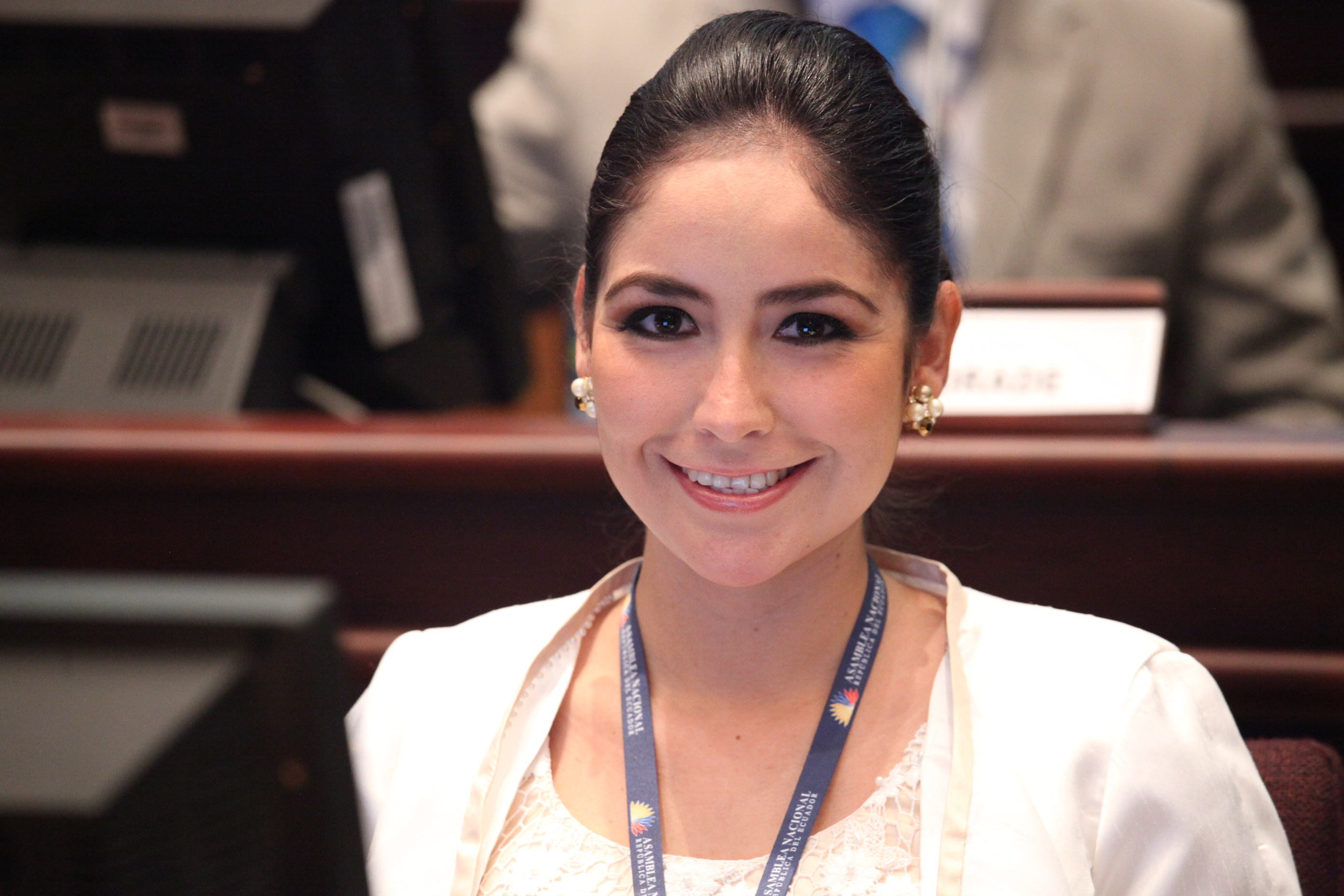
Denisse Robles in 2013

Denisse Priscila Robles Andrade (born 11 July 1987) is an Ecuadorian economist and politician. She formerly served as mayor of the city of Milagro. Her election in 2014 made her the youngest person to be elected as a mayor in Ecuador.

== Biography ==
Robles was born on 11 July 1987 in Milagro. She is the daughter of Sandra Andrade and Presley Robles. Robles was educated at Alborada High School in the FAE Education Unit No. 3 (TAURA) and studied economics at the Universidad de Especialidades Espíritu Santo where she graduated with the top grades in her class. She is married to Carlos Xavier Zuniga Pico, a doctor, with whom she has one child. Her public life began in 2007 when she was elected as beauty queen of the city of Milagro. Two years later, during the regional elections of 2009, she ran and won a seat as councillor with the political movement party PAIS Alliance. In November 2012, Robles resigned her post of councillor to stand as candidate for assemblywoman in the legislative elections of 2013, where she headed the list of candidates of PAIS Alliance for the fourth district of the province of Guayas and was elected.

She resigned her position in the Assembly in November 2013 to participate in the sectional elections the following year, as a candidate for mayor of Milagro. Robles stated during the election campaign that she wanted to have a railway station built in the city, and hoped to have two water treatment plants constructed in order to improve the coverage of Milgaro's drinking water. She pledged training for traders and housewives to allow them more financial development, and wanted to encourage tourism and trade in the city. She was elected the mayor of Milgaro with 38% of the vote, finishing ahead of Romulo Minchala, and the incumbent mayor Francisco Ashan. Robles assumed office in May 2014, becoming the first female mayor of the city, and the youngest mayor in the country.
