= Tayla Harris =

Australian rules footballer (born 1997)

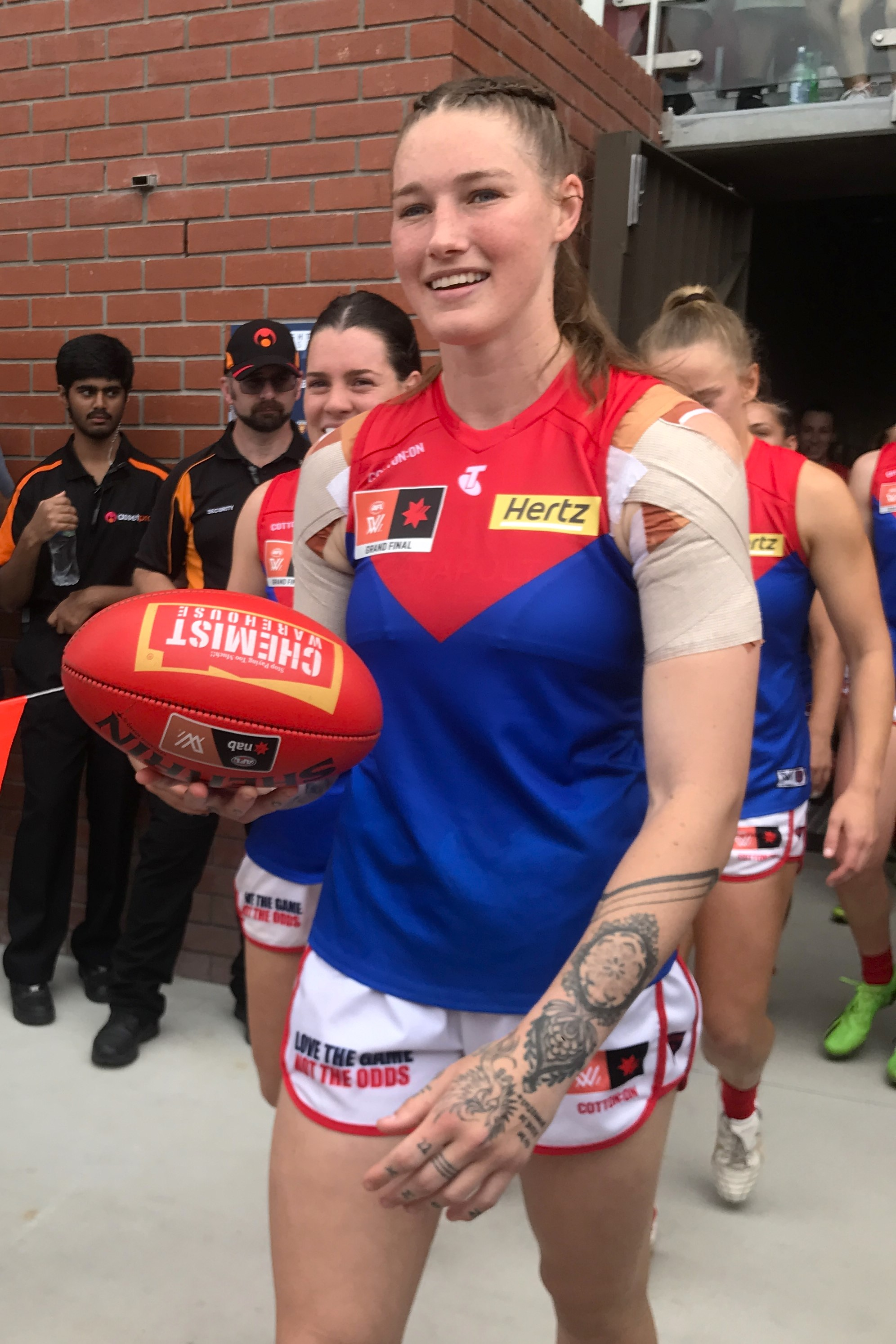
- Harris with Melbourne in 2022
Australian rules football career
Personal information
- Born: 16 April 1997 (age 29); Brisbane, Queensland, Australia
- Original team: Zillmere (QAWFL)
- Draft: Marquee player, 2016: Brisbane
- Debut: Round 1, 2017, Brisbane vs. Melbourne, at Casey Fields
- Height: 177 cm (5 ft 10 in)
- Position: Forward/ruck
Club information
- Current club: Melbourne
- Number: 7
Playing career^{1}
Years	Club	Games (Goals)
2017	Brisbane	8 (4)
2018–2021	Carlton	29 (25)
2022 (S6)–	Melbourne	48 (48)
Total		85 (77)
Representative team honours^{2}
Years	Team	Games (Goals)
2017	Allies	1 (1)
- ^{1} Playing statistics correct to the end of the 2025 season.^{2} Representative statistics correct as of 2017.
Career highlights
- AFLW: AFLW Premiership Player: 2022 (S7); 4× AFL Women's All-Australian team: 2017, 2018, 2020, 2022 (S6); 3× Carlton leading goalkicker: 2018, 2019, 2020; Melbourne leading goalkicker: 2022 (S6); State: QAWFL best and fairest: 2012
- Boxing career
- Weight: Middleweight

Boxing record
- Total fights: 10
- Wins: 8
- Win by KO: 3
- Losses: 1
- Draws: 1

Tayla Harris (born 16 April 1997) is a professional Australian sportsperson best known for her careers in Australian rules football with the Melbourne Football Club in the AFL Women's (AFLW) and in professional boxing. She is a highly successful boxer, being an Australian National Boxing Federation female middleweight title holder. As a footballer, she plays as a key forward and previously played with Carlton and Brisbane. Harris is an AFLW premiership player, four-time All-Australian, as well as former Carlton leading goalkicker and Melbourne leading goalkicker.

== Early life and amateur career ==
Harris was born and raised in Brisbane's northern suburbs and began playing competitive football for Aspley at age five. She played in a mixed competition with young girls and boys until 2010.

At the age of 15, she began playing senior football for Zillmere in the AFL Queensland Women's League (QAWFL), where she won the league best and fairest award in her first season. In 2017, following a move to Melbourne, she began playing in the VFL Women's competition with the St Kilda Sharks.

She represented Queensland in the youth girls competition, and is a five time All-Australian.

At the age of 17, she was drafted to the Melbourne representative side as part of the AFL women's exhibition series. She continued to play for the club through 2016. She also played as part of the Brisbane Lions' representative team in 2016.

She attended primary school at Prince of Peace Lutheran College and high school at Albany Creek State High School.

== AFL Women's career ==
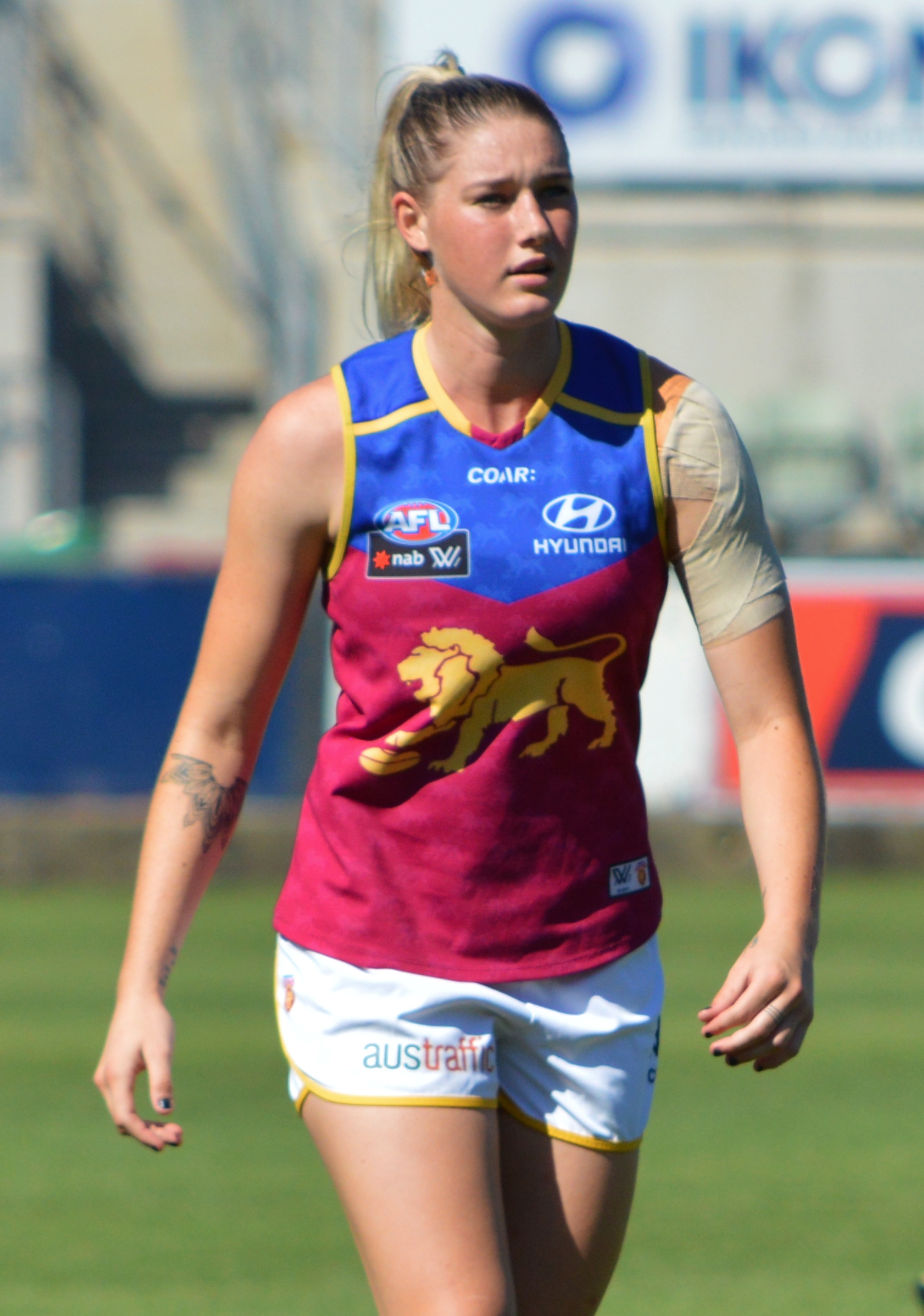
Harris playing for Brisbane in 2017

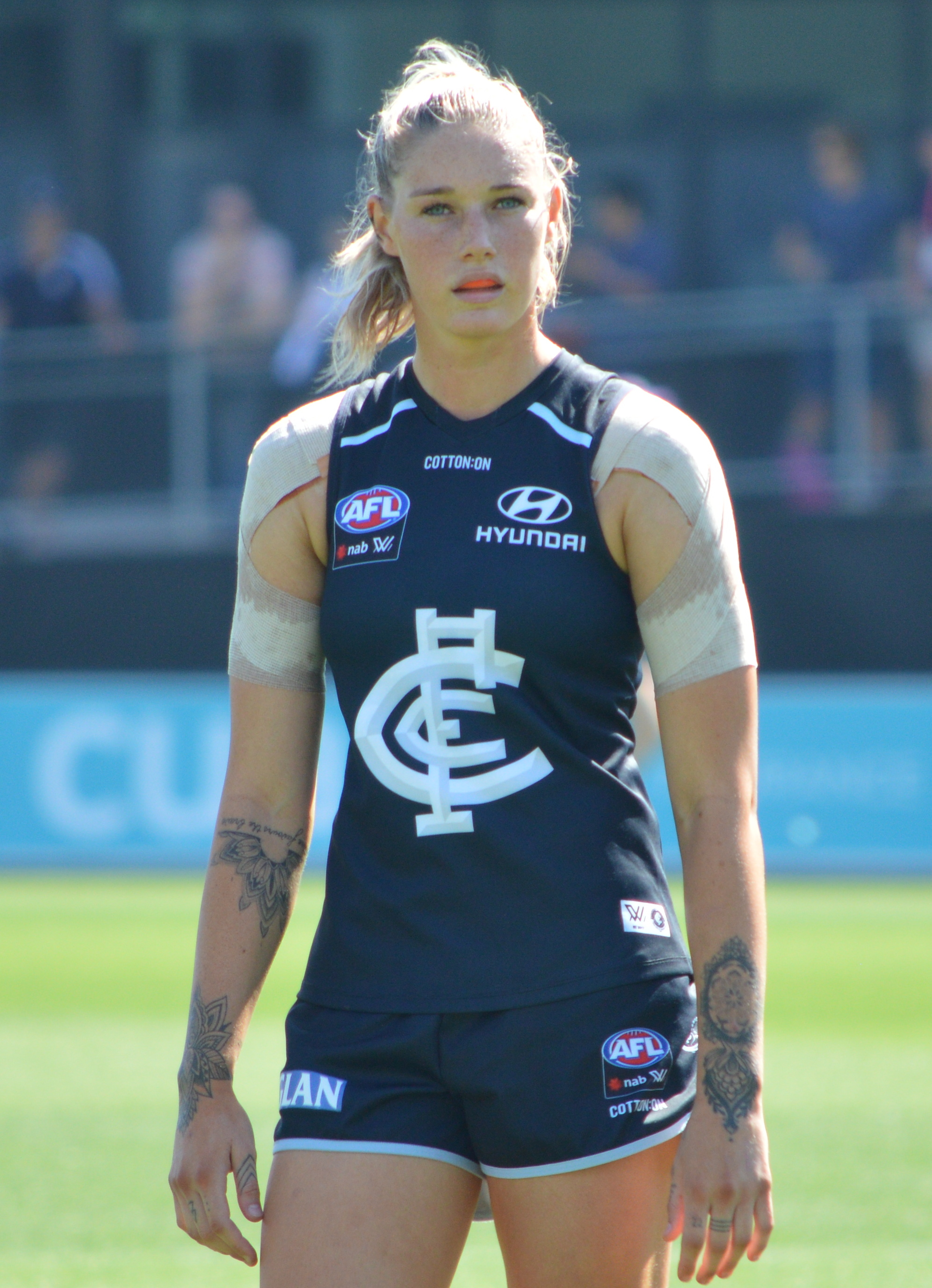
Harris playing for Carlton in 2019

Harris was one of two marquee player signings announced by Brisbane in anticipation of the league's inaugural 2017 season. She made her league debut in the club's inaugural match, in round 1, 2017, against Melbourne at Casey Fields. In round 2, she was nominated for the league Rising Star award for a two-goal, twelve disposal and seven mark performance against Fremantle, and also was named "Player of the Week" by the AFL Players Association. At the conclusion of two rounds she was ranked equal fourth in the league for total goals scored (two) and first in the league for contested marks (eight).

At the end of the season, Harris was listed in the 2017 All-Australian team.

Prior to the 2017 AFLW trade period, Harris expressed her desire to be traded to a Victorian club. The trade period started on 15 May. Early talks between Brisbane and Carlton faltered; although Carlton offered Bianca Jakobsson in trade, Brisbane wanted an additional player. Melbourne also made an offer for Harris. On 25 May 2017, Harris was traded to Carlton in a complex trade involving four teams, five players and a draft pick.

She played six matches with her new club in 2018 and kicked five goals, tying with Darcy Vescio to share the club's leading goalkicker award with them. She also claimed All-Australian selection that year, named on the interchange bench. Her 2019 and 2020 seasons were both solid, as she kicked 8 goals in each. She was named in the All-Australian team in 2020 on the interchange bench. 2021 saw Harris down on form, playing 9 games but only kicking 4 goals and averaging under 10 disposals. Harris was involved in controversy in March 2021 after it was reported that she missed part of her training in order to create an Instagram post promoting her new documentary. Around May 2021, it was revealed that Harris was looking for the club to double her salary to a total of $150,000, which Carlton were reluctant to do. Harris cautioned that she may switch sporting codes back to boxing, where she was successful in the past. It was reported that her relationship with the club had begun to deteriorate. Harris ultimately requested a trade to Melbourne, and was traded on 8 June.

=== AFLW statistics ===
Statistics are correct to the end of 2022 season 6.

Legend
G	Goals	K	Kicks	D	Disposals	T	Tackles
B	Behinds	H	Handballs	M	Marks

Season	Team	No.	Games	Totals							Averages (per game)							Votes
Season	Team	No.	Games	G	B	K	H	D	M	T	G	B	K	H	D	M	T	Votes
2017	Brisbane	7	8	4	9	45	11	56	23	16	0.5	1.1	5.6	1.4	7.0	2.9	2.0	6
2018	Carlton	22	6	5	6	48	11	59	20	19	0.8	1.0	8.0	1.8	9.8	3.3	3.2	4
2019	Carlton	7	8	8	7	50	13	63	25	21	1.0	0.9	6.3	1.6	7.9	3.1	2.6	0
2020	Carlton	7	7	8	5	55	18	73	26	17	1.1	0.7	7.9	2.6	10.5	3.7	2.4	3
2021	Carlton	7	9	4	3	34	14	48	16	17	0.5	0.3	4.3	1.8	6.0	2.0	2.1	0
2022 (S6)	Melbourne	7	12	18	11	66	31	97	39	17	1.5	0.9	5.5	2.6	8.1	3.3	1.4	3
Career			49	47	40	298	98	396	149	107	1.0	0.8	6.1	2.0	8.1	3.0	2.2	13

== Professional boxing record ==
10 fights	8 wins	1 loss
By knockout	3	0
By decision	5	1
Draws	1	

No.	Result	Record	Opponent	Type	Round, time	Date	Location	Notes
10	Loss	8-1-1	(Nigeria) Millicent Agboegbulem	MD	2	26 Jul 2023	Hoops Capital East, Moore Park, Australia	
9	Win	8-0-1	(Australia) Connie Chan	UD	6	29 Apr 2023	The Melbourne Pavilion, Flemington, Victoria, Australia	Won Australian National Boxing Federation Australasian Super Welter (vacant)
8	Win	7–0–1	(Australia) Janay Harding	TKO	4 (8), 0:58	22 Nov 2019	The Melbourne Pavilion, Flemington, Victoria, Australia	Won vacant Australian female super-welterweight title
7	Win	6–0–1	(Australia) Margarite Butcher	TKO	2 (8), 1:18	18 Oct 2019	The Melbourne Pavilion, Flemington, Victoria, Australia	Won Australian female middleweight title
6	Win	5–0–1	(Australia) Renee Gartner	TKO	2 (5), 1:53	14 Aug 2019	ICC Exhibition Centre, Sydney, New South Wales, Australia	
5	Draw	4–0–1	(Australia) Sarah Dwyer	MD	8	17 Nov 2018	The Melbourne Pavilion, Flemington, Victoria, Australia	For vacant Australian female middleweight title
4	Win	4–0–0	(Australia) Janay Harding	UD	5	7 Sep 2018	The Melbourne Pavilion, Flemington, Victoria, Australia	
3	Win	3–0	(Australia) Margarite Butcher	UD	6	4 Aug 2018	The Melbourne Pavilion, Flemington, Victoria, Australia	
2	Win	2–0	(New Zealand) Tessa Tualevao	MD	4	23 Sep 2017	Eatons Hill Hotel, Eatons Hill, Queensland, Australia	
1	Win	1–0	(Australia) Margarite Butcher	UD	4	24 Jun 2017	Eatons Hill Hotel, Eatons Hill, Queensland, Australia	

== Online harassment ==
The original picture

A picture taken by AFL Media photographer Michael Willson showing Harris kicking for goal during a 2019 match against the Western Bulldogs became the target of sexual Internet trolling after it was posted on social media by Seven Network. Harris retweeted the photograph with the caption: "Here’s a pic of me at work... think about this before your derogatory comments, animals". Critics of the trolls included fellow AFLW players Erin Phillips and Darcy Vescio, Geelong player Patrick Dangerfield, cyclist Anna Meares, AFLW head of football Nicole Livingstone and Australian Football League chief executive Gillon McLachlan, and federal minister for women Kelly O'Dwyer. Phillips, Vescio, Meares and O'Dwyer joined the chorus of people condemning Seven's decision to remove the photo, which was perceived as yielding to the trolls. It was later reinstated with an apology.

On 11 September 2019, a bronze statue immortalising the image was unveiled in Federation Square Melbourne.

On 27 February 2020, Tayla Harris was announced as an ambassador for Our Watch, a national organisation tasked with preventing violence against women and their children.

== Personal life ==
Harris was previously in a relationship with former AFLW players Kodi Jacques and Sarah Dargan.

Harris is currently dating the older brother of Brisbane Lions player Cam Rayner.

== Recognition ==
She was recognized as one of the BBC's 100 women of 2019.

== See also ==
- List of Australian rules football statues
