= Milagro Canton =

Milagro Canton San Francisco de Milagro
- Canton
- Flag

- Location of Milagro Canton in Guayas Province

- Location of Guayas Province
- Coordinates: 2°7′37″S 79°35′57″W
- Country: Ecuador
- Province: Guayas Province
- Capital: Milagro

Area
  - Total: 399.2 km^{2} (154.1 sq mi)

Population (2022 census)
  - Total: 195,943
  - Density: 490.8/km^{2} (1,271/sq mi)
- Time zone: UTC-5 (ECT)

Milagro Canton is a canton of Ecuador, located in the Guayas Province. Its capital is the town of Milagro. Its population at the 2001 census was 140,103.

== Demographics ==
Ethnic groups as of the Ecuadorian census of 2010:

- Mestizo 75.4%
- Montubio 9.6%
- Afro-Ecuadorian 7.4%
- White 6.4%
- Indigenous 1.0%
- Other 0.3%
