= Miss Teen Supranational =

Teen Beauty pageant

- Formation: 2018; 8 years ago
- Type: Beauty pageant
- Headquarters: Ecuador
- Location: Guayaquil
- CEO Founder: Rodrigo Moreira (2018-present)
- Staff: 25
- Website: Official Site

Miss Teen Supranational is an international teen beauty contest.

The current Miss Teen Supranational is Maria Eduarda Targa of Brazil who was crowned on November 30, 2025, in Chiclayo, Peru.

== Titleholders ==
Year	Miss Teen Supranational	Country	Hometown	Age	Ref.
2018	Zahira Perez Gerena	Puerto Rico	Yabucoa	18	
2019	Anna Laura Agürto	Panama	Las Tablas	19	
2020^{1}	Yianaliz Moquete	Dominican Republic	Santo Domingo	19	
2021	Kate Mayta Del Río	Peru	Huancayo	19	
2022	Frany Delgado Quintero	Ecuador	Esmeraldas	19	
2023	Lorena Ruiz Sanchez	Spain	Málaga	16	
2024	Daniela Jiménez Carrión	Ecuador	Puyango	18	
2025	María Eduarda Targa	Brazil	Colíder	18	

^{1}Judging of the competition took place outside of the normal pageant environment due to the global restrictions on public events and international travel imposed by the Covid-19 pandemic. The winner was crowned in a live-streamed event.

== Countries/Territory by winning number ==
Nation	Titles	Year(s)
Ecuador	2	2022, 2024
Puerto Rico	1	2018
Panama	1	2019
Dominican Republic	1	2020
Peru	1	2021
Spain	1	2023
Brazil	1	2025

== See also ==
- Miss Teen Ecuador
