= Miss Teen Earth =

International beauty pageant

- Formation: 2012; 14 years ago
- Type: Beauty pageant
- Headquarters: Ecuador
- Location: Guayaquil
- Official language: English
- CEO Founder: Rodrigo Moreira
- Staff: 25
- Website: missteenearth.org

Miss Teen Earth is an annual international teen beauty pageant.

The current Miss Teen Earth is Gabriela Pinheiro of Brazil who was crowned on November 30, 2025 in Chiclayo, Peru. Her title marked the first back-to-back victory in Miss Teen Earth history.

== History ==
The pageant started in Ecuador in the year 2012 and was continued in the coming year as well.

The Miss Teen Earth contest is an event that promotes the main tourist destinations in Ecuador.

The contest is the first teen pageant that promotes programs in favor of the environment and visits to children with cancer.

The Miss Teen Earth contest was held in the Central American country of Panama from 2014 to 2016.

During these years the competition was supported by the Mayor of Panama, who gave an important recognition to the pageant, for promoting environmentally beneficial activities, which included a reforestation program at the Parque Municipal Summit, a zoo and tropical botanical garden, refuge of different exotic plants and animals considered endangered.

== Environmental Contribution ==
The Miss Teen Earth pageant has been directly linked to government entities, which is why it has managed large contributions as educational tours and reforestation campaigns, with the support of the Municipality of Panama City and the Ministry of Environment of Panama.

== Competition ==
The competition consists of introduction round, national costume, swimsuit, question answer round and evening gown.

== Winners ==
Year	Titleholder	Represented	Age	Host country	Venue	Date
2025	Gabriela Pinheiro	Brazil	15	Chiclayo, Peru (Note: Originally scheduled to be held in Lima, Peru, but was moved to Chiclayo due to state of emergency.)	Hotel Casa Andina	November 30, 2025
2024	Karinne Lino	Brazil	19	Lima, Peru	Triax Television	November 24, 2024
2023	Chloe-Jade Christian	South Africa	16	Guayaquil, Ecuador	Concha Acústica, Parque Samanes	November 14, 2023
2022	Yarely Vázquez	Mexico	19	Guayaquil, Ecuador	Hotel Oro Verde	October 19, 2022
2021	María Laura Mariano da Silva	Brazil	18	Guayaquil, Ecuador	Concha Acústica, Parque Samanes	October 23, 2021
2020^{1}	Evelyn Cartagena	Ecuador	19	Milagro, Ecuador	Salón de la Ciudad, GAD Milagro	September 19, 2020
2019	Giovanna Casagrande	Brazil	19	Guayaquil, Ecuador	Centro Empresarial Las Cámaras	September 1, 2019
2019	Arisbe Cueto Ramírez	Mexico	16	Guayaquil, Ecuador	Centro Empresarial Las Cámaras	September 1, 2019
2018	Shanty Kanhai Agrela	Aruba	19	Milagro, Ecuador	Parque Central de Milagro	September 1, 2018
2017	Emily Garcia	Brazil	16	Milagro, Ecuador	Parque Central de Milagro	September 3, 2017
2016	Sarah Levandowski Rock	United States	16	Panama City, Panama	Continental Hotel & Casino	October 1, 2016
2015	María Daniela Cepeda Matamoros	Ecuador	19	Panama City, Panama	Continental Hotel & Casino	October 17, 2015
2014	Stella Velez Iandoli	Venezuela	13	Panama City, Panama	Hotel El Panamá	October 25, 2014
2013	Raisa Nicole Velez Contreras	Puerto Rico	15	Milagro, Ecuador	Coliseo Edmundo Valdez	September 1, 2013
2012	María del Cisne Rivera Álvarez	Ecuador	16	Guayaquil, Ecuador	Auditorio Espol Las Peñas	September 16, 2012

^{1}Judging of the competition took place outside of the normal pageant environment due to the global restrictions on public events and international travel imposed by the Covid-19 pandemic. The winner was crowned in a live-streamed event.

=== Countries/territories by number of title wins ===
Country	Titles	Year(s)
Brazil	5	2017, 2019, 2021, 2024, 2025
Ecuador	3	2012, 2015, 2020
Mexico	2	2019, 2022
South Africa	1	2023
Aruba	1	2018
Brazil	1	2017
United States	1	2016
Venezuela	1	2014
Puerto Rico	1	2013

== List of elemental queens ==
Year	Air	Water	Fire
2025	Sofía Peñafiel; Ecuador	Bryana Hampson; United Kingdom	Daniela Yáñez; Mexico
2024	Sharica Bondesio; South Africa	Johanne Zambrano; Ecuador	Ariana Toledo; Mexico
2023	Ana Santana; Brazil	Danna Soto; Ecuador	Jasmin Vasquez; Mexico
2022	Sadie Proulx; Canada	Keilani Eybrechts; Curaçao	Tyla Taylor; South Africa
2021	Gugulethu Mayisela; South Africa	Paola Delgado; Paraguay	Ángeles Rivera; Peru
2019	Sabrina Alarcón; Paraguay	Francine Gamboa; Philippines	Betty Hoyos; Colombia
2018	Joseane Bonissoni; Brazil	Zahira Pérez; Puerto Rico	Bhavna Jain; India
2017	Leticia Lezcano; Paraguay	Carla Navarro; Mexico	Yenny Sanoja; Venezuela
2016	Allison Roberts; Mexico	Sayra León; Ecuador	Patricia Barreto; Paraguay
2015	Mariannette Torres; Puerto Rico	Grace Jiménez; Panama	Ana Ramírez; Mexico
2014	Mónica Carrillo; Mexico	Gabriela Nepomuceno; Brazil	Débora Zamora; Ecuador
2013	Megan Trenidad; Curaçao	Iris Carvallo; Ecuador	Laura Ornano; Panama
2012	Jhairie Aguilar; United States	Mónica Serrano; Puerto Rico	Dahiana Villalona; Dominican Republic

== Major beauty pageants ==
Miss Teen Earth titleholder in the world's major beauty contests as Miss Universe.

Year	Miss Universe
2017	María Daniela Cepeda Matamoros; Miss Universe Ecuador 2017; Ecuador

== See also ==
- Miss Teen Ecuador
- Rodrigo Moreira
