= Milagro, Ecuador =

Milagro
- City
- San Francisco de Milagro
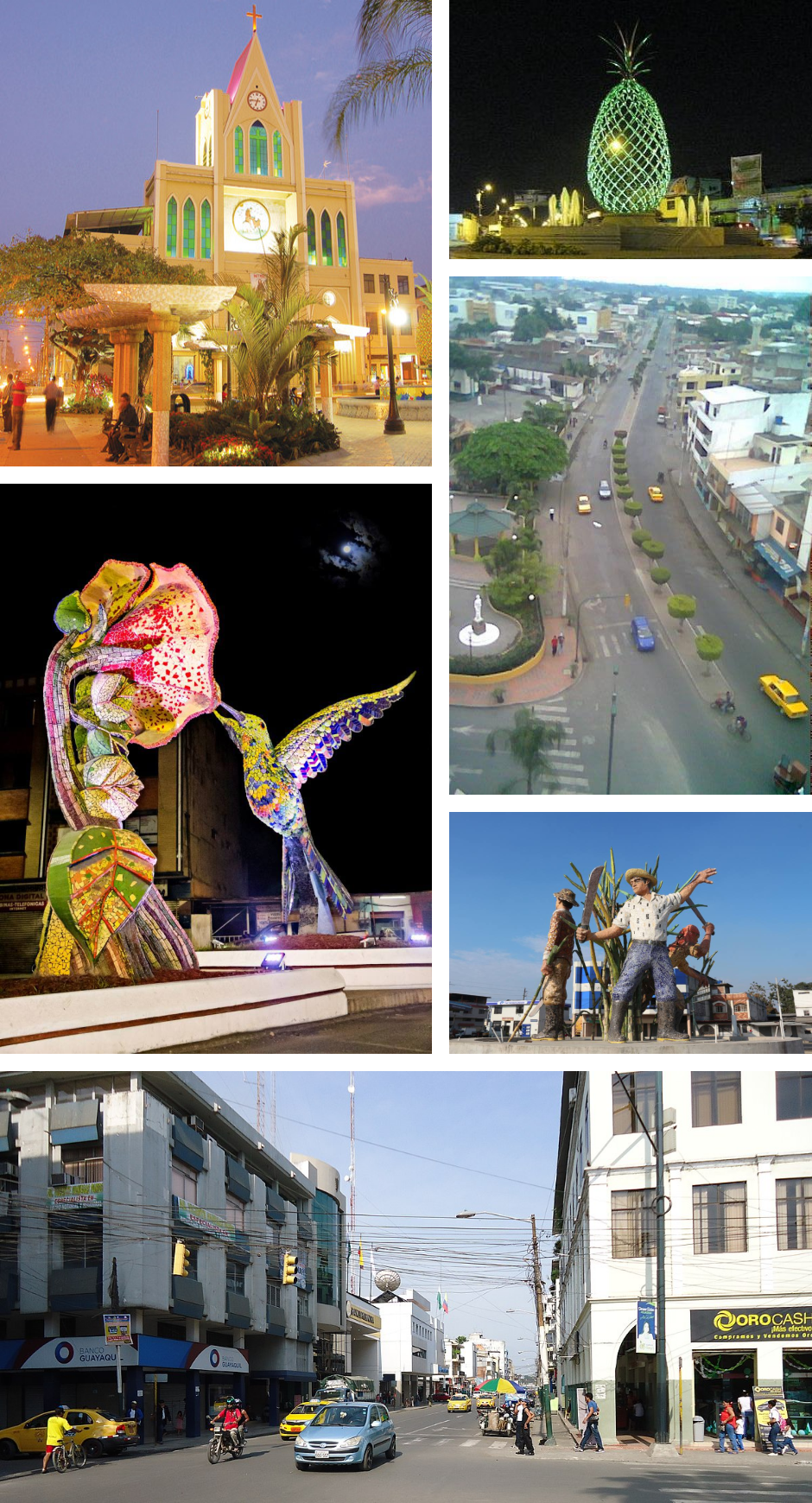
- From top, left to right: St. Francis of Assisi Central Church, monument to the Pineapple, 17th September avenue, monument to the Hummingbird, monument to the Harvester, 9th October street.

- Flag
- Nickname: Tierra de la caña de azucar y de la piña (Milagro la ciudad mas dulce del Ecuador)
- Motto: Milagro is changing (Milagro esta cambiando)
- Location within Ecuador
- Coordinates: 02°08′05″S 79°35′14″W
- Country: Ecuador
- Province: Guayas
- Canton: Milagro
- Founded: 17 September 1913

Government
  - Mayor: Pedro Solines

Area
  - City: 26.06 km^{2} (10.06 sq mi)
- Elevation: 12 m (39 ft)

Population (2022)
  - City: 159,970
  - Density: 6,139/km^{2} (15,900/sq mi)
- Time zone: UTC-5 (ECT)
- Area code: (+593) 04
- Climate: Aw
- Demonym: milagreño, -a

San Francisco de Milagro (also known as Milagro, which is Spanish for Miracle) is a city located in Guayas, Ecuador. It is the seat of Milagro Canton.

Milagro is the fourth largest city in the province of Guayas. As of the census of 2022, there were 195,943 people residing within the canton limits.

Denisse Robles, mayor (2014), pledged to get a city railway station and to improve the coverage of Milagro's drinking water. She was elected the mayor of Milagro in 2014 with 38% of the vote, finishing ahead of the incumbent mayor Francisco Asan. Robles assumed office in May 2014, becoming the first female mayor of the city, and the youngest mayor in the country.

== Climate ==
Climate data for Milagro, elevation 13 m (43 ft), (1971–2000)
Month	Jan	Feb	Mar	Apr	May	Jun	Jul	Aug	Sep	Oct	Nov	Dec	Year
Mean daily maximum °C (°F)	30.7 (87.3)	30.8 (87.4)	31.4 (88.5)	31.5 (88.7)	30.7 (87.3)	29.1 (84.4)	28.4 (83.1)	28.7 (83.7)	29.3 (84.7)	29.2 (84.6)	29.7 (85.5)	31.0 (87.8)	30.0 (86.1)
Mean daily minimum °C (°F)	21.1 (70.0)	21.6 (70.9)	21.9 (71.4)	21.7 (71.1)	21.1 (70.0)	20.1 (68.2)	19.0 (66.2)	18.9 (66.0)	19.3 (66.7)	19.5 (67.1)	19.8 (67.6)	20.7 (69.3)	20.4 (68.7)
Average precipitation mm (inches)	257.0 (10.12)	276.0 (10.87)	282.0 (11.10)	224.0 (8.82)	63.0 (2.48)	30.0 (1.18)	1.0 (0.04)	1.0 (0.04)	6.0 (0.24)	4.0 (0.16)	10.0 (0.39)	56.0 (2.20)	1,210 (47.64)
Average relative humidity (%)	84	87	85	84	85	84	84	82	79	79	77	77	82
Source: FAO
