= Miss Teenager World =

International beauty pageant in Ecuador

- Formation: 1990; 36 years ago
- Founder: César Montecé; Queen of Ecuador Inc.
- Type: Beauty pageant
- Headquarters: Ecuador
- Location: Guayaquil
- Official language: English
- President: Rodrigo Moreira (2014-present)
- Website: missteenagerworld.com

Miss Teenager World is the oldest international teen beauty pageant, founded in Guayaquil, Ecuador.

The pageant is only open to teenage girls and women who have never been married or given birth.

The current Miss Teenager World is Sahara Ledesma of Colombia who was crowned on November 30, 2025 in Chiclayo, Peru.

== History ==
Miss Teenager World was launched in the year 1990 and continued in the coming year as well. In 2016, the beauty contest chose to Miss Teenager Universal and was held for the first time in the history in Panama.

== Titleholders ==
The following women have been crowned Miss Teenager World

Year	Country/Territory	Miss Teenager World	Venue
2025	Colombia	Sahara Ledesma	Chiclayo, Peru
2024	South Africa	Mogau Ramaila	Lima, Peru
2023	Spain	Mia Acosta Iparraguirre	Guayaquil, Ecuador
2022	Mexico	Ilse Vanessa Torres Granados	Guayaquil, Ecuador
2021	Canada	Jessica Lyn Macniel	Guayaquil, Ecuador
2020	Due to the impact of COVID-19 pandemic, no pageant in 2020^{1}		
2019	Aruba	Zury Ruiz	Guayaquil, Ecuador
2018	Costa Rica	Valeria Stefania Franceschi Alvarado	Panama City, Panama
2017	Panama	Dannelys Barrios	Panama City, Panama
2016	Brazil	Luana Passos	Panama City, Panama
2015	Ecuador	Angie Larrea Barzola	Guayaquil, Ecuador
2014	Puerto Rico	Sheisa Blasini Torres	Guayaquil, Ecuador
No pageants were held between 2010—2013
César Montecé pageant ownership era
2009	Brazil	Isis Stocco Machado	Guayaquil, Ecuador
2008	Venezuela	Ana María Fois Colina	Guayaquil, Ecuador
2007	United States	Xioreli De La Vega	Guayaquil, Ecuador
2006	Dominican Republic	Paloma Massiel Almonte Reynoso	Guayaquil, Ecuador
2005	Ecuador	Ximena Valarezo Alvarado	Guayaquil, Ecuador
2004	Canada	Daniela Rojas	Guayaquil, Ecuador
2003	Ecuador	Yalitza Alcívar Montecé	Guayaquil, Ecuador
2002	Peru	Tracy Freundt Bonilla	Guayaquil, Ecuador
2001	Costa Rica	Marianela Zeledón Bolaños	Guayaquil, Ecuador
2000	Argentina	Gabriela Sobrado	Salinas, Ecuador

^{1}No pageant was held in 2020 due to the global restrictions on public events and international travel imposed by the COVID-19 pandemic.

== Countries/Territory by winning number ==
Nation	Titles	Year(s)
Ecuador	3	2003, 2005, 2015
Costa Rica	2	2001, 2018
Canada	2	2004, 2021
Brazil	2	2009, 2016
Argentina	1	2000
Peru	1	2002
Dominican Republic	1	2006
United States	1	2007
Venezuela	1	2008
Puerto Rico	1	2014
Panama	1	2017
Aruba	1	2019
Mexico	1	2022
Spain	1	2023
South Africa	1	2024
Colombia	1	2025

== Major beauty pageants ==
Miss Teenager World titleholders in the world's major beauty contests.

Year	Miss Earth
2003	Marianela Zeledon Bolaños; Miss Earth Costa Rica and Miss Water 2003; Costa Rica
	Miss Intercontinental
2013	Paloma Almonte Reynoso; Miss Intercontinental Dominican Republic 2013; Dominican Republic
	Miss International
2015	Isis Stocco Machado; Miss International Brazil; Brazil
2021	Valeria Franceschi; Miss International Panama; Panama

== Crossovers ==
Titleholders who previously competed or will be competing at other international beauty pageants:

Miss Asia Pacific International

- 2003: Peru: Tracy Freundt (3rd. Runner Up)

Miss Turismo de las Américas

- 2006: Ecuador: Yalitza Alcívar (Winner)

Top Model of the World

- 2008: Dominican Republic: Paloma Almonte(Unplaced)

== See also ==
- Miss Teen World
