= Miss Teen International (Americas) =

International beauty pageant

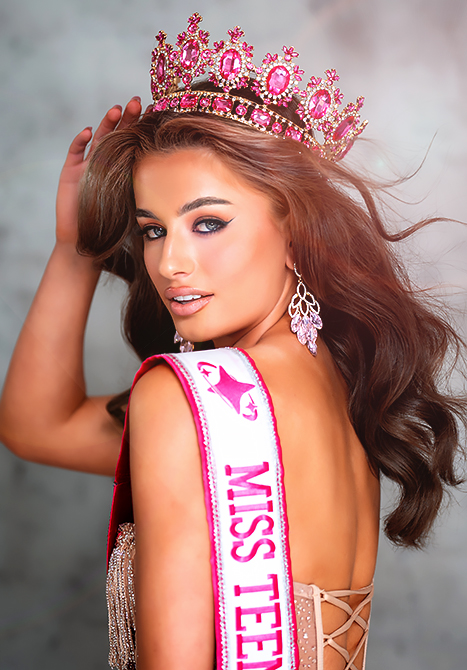
- Established: 1966; 60 years ago
- Founder: Al Burton
- Type: Beauty pageant
- Headquarters: Ecuador
- Location: Guayaquil
- Official language: Spanish
- CEO President: Rodrigo Moreira (2014–present)
- Website: missteeninternational.org

Miss Teen International is an international beauty pageant for girls aged 15–19 years of all nationalities, operated by Ecuadorian businessman Rodrigo Moreira, owner of all intellectual property rights in Brazil, Chile, Costa Rica, Dominican Republic, El Salvador, Ecuador, Mexico and Panama.

The reigning Miss Teen International is Saskia Lincoln of the United Kingdom, who was crowned on November 30, 2025, in Chiclayo, Peru.

== History ==
=== 1966 to 1969 ===
The first contest bestowing the title of Miss Teen International took place on Wednesday, April 4, 1966, in Hollywood and was hosted by Adam West, star of TV's Batman, with guest appearances by actresses Mia Farrow and Barbara Parkins, actors Vic Morrow and John Astin, singers Robert Goulet and Sonny & Cher, and 1965 Miss Teen USA Susan Henning.

The 1967 Miss Teen International pageant was held again in Hollywood on Saturday, March 20, and was hosted by actress Sally Field and actor-singer Noel Harrison, with 1966 Miss Teen USA Cindy Lewis making an appearance, along with the current 1966 and first Miss Teen International, Ewa Aulin, 17, who crowned her successor.

At the 1968 pageant in Hollywood on Saturday, April 13, there were 12 girls from different countries participating in the event, with Miss Teen USA Pamela Martin, 18, representing the United States.

The pageant was produced by Al Burton and the final competition aired as a single one-hour special nationally in prime time in the United States for each of four consecutive years on the ABC Television network in the United States and syndicated airing in foreign TV markets.

=== 1993 to 2014 ===
A version of the pageant unrelated to the original 1966 Hollywood pageant based in Costa Rica began in 1993 by Enrique Gonzalez, who also operated the Mr Costa Rica and Miss Teen Costa Rica pageants. It was held through 2014 with the winner that year being Ailin Adorno, 17, of Paraguay.

Currently Rodrigo Moreira is the owner of all intellectual property rights in the Registry of Intellectual Property Ministry of Justice and Peace of Costa Rica.

=== 2014 to 2018 ===
Another version was first held in 2014 and was previously called Miss Teenager International. The title was won by Fabiola Ortiz from Bolivia, the first winner.

She not only won the maximum title, but she also obtained the prizes for Best Figure and Best Smile. Fabiola was sent to the contest by Promociones Gloria.

=== 2019 to present ===
A version of the Miss Teen International pageant based in Ecuador is held annually. It began planning operation in 2018 by Rodrigo Moreira, who filed a trademark application that year in Ecuador for "Miss Teen International" (in English) and was approved in 2019. The first winner of the Miss Teen International title in Ecuador in 2019 was Luciana Begazo of Peru.

Rodrigo Moreira also owns the trademark at the National Institute of Industrial Property of Chile, the National Office of Industrial Property Ministry of Industry, Trade and MSMEs (ONAPI) of the Dominican Republic, the National Center of Records of the Republic of El Salvador and the Mexican Institute of Industrial Property of the Federal government of the United Mexican States.

== Eligibility criteria ==
Sex	Female
Age range	15 to 19
Marital status	Single
Height	At least 1.60 metres / 5'2"
Skills	Communication skills, modelling experience
Additional attributes	Photogenic, pleasing personality, friendly

== Titleholders ==
Edition	Titleholder	Country	Venue of Competition	Entrants	Ref.
Al Burton pageant ownership era
1966	Ewa Aulin	Sweden	Hollywood, California, United States	10	
1967	Alice Alfeim	Norway	Hollywood, California, United States	10	
1968	Jeanette McLeod	Australia	Hollywood, California, United States	11	
1969	Mary Louise Lewis	England	Hollywood, California, United States	12	
Enrique Gonzalez pageant ownership era
1993	Sofia Andersson	Sweden	San José, Costa Rica	23	
1994	Ana Carina Góis	Brazil	San José, Costa Rica	29	
1995	Kristen Hungerford	Sweden	San José, Costa Rica	23	
1996	Renata Cavazzana	Brazil	San José, Costa Rica	22	
1997	Katherine González	Puerto Rico	San José, Costa Rica	21	
1998	Vanessa Martins	Brazil	Guatemala City, Guatemala	17	
1999	Carolina Raven	Aruba	San José, Costa Rica	12	
2000	Mary Ann Statia	Curaçao	Oranjestad, Aruba	14	
2001	Yaraliz Lasanta	Puerto Rico	Willemstad, Curacao	12	
2002	Fabriella Quesada	Costa Rica	San José, Costa Rica	13	
2003	María Teresa Rodríguez	Costa Rica	Coliseo Luis Leoro Franco, Ibarra, Ecuador	18	
2004	Lauryn Eagle	Australia	San José, Costa Rica	21	
2005	No pageant held				
2006	Mayra Matos	Puerto Rico	Teatro Auditorio Nacional, San José, Costa Rica	16	
2007	Jenny Quiroga	Mexico	Auditorio del Parque de la Exposición, Lima, Peru	18	
2008	Isabele Sánchez	Brazil	Teatro Auditorio Nacional, San José, Costa Rica	16	
2009	Nazareth Cascante	Costa Rica	Teatro Auditorio Nacional, San José, Costa Rica	15	
2010	Lynette do Nascimento	Aruba	Teatro Auditorio Nacional, San José, Costa Rica	14	
2011	Adriana Paniagua	Nicaragua	Teatro Auditorio Nacional, San José, Costa Rica	12	
2012	Valerie Hernández	Puerto Rico	Teatro Auditorio Nacional, San José, Costa Rica	10	
2013	Isabella Novaes	Brazil	Teatro Auditorio Nacional, San José, Costa Rica	10	
2014	Ailin Adorno	Paraguay	Hotel Riu, Guanacaste, Costa Rica	11	
Rodrigo Moreira pageant ownership era
2014	Fabiola Ortiz	Bolivia	Auditorio del MAAC, Guayaquil, Ecuador	12	
2015	Paola Serrano	Puerto Rico	Teatro Centro de Arte, Guayaquil, Ecuador	15	
2016	Camila Montenegro	Ecuador	Continental Hotel, Panama City, Panama	14	
2017	Tanailyn Medina	Puerto Rico	Centro Empresarial Las Cámaras, Guayaquil, Ecuador	16	
2018	Julia Hemza	Brazil	Centro Empresarial Las Cámaras, Guayaquil, Ecuador	18	
2019	Luciana Begazo	Peru	Centro Empresarial Las Cámaras, Guayaquil, Ecuador	28	
2020^{1}	Maria Alejandra Royo	Panama	Nex Televisión, Panama City, Panama	12	
2021	Aurora Villalobos	Mexico	Concha Acústica, Parque Samanes, Guayaquil, Ecuador	15	
2022	Yulienke Jacobs	South Africa	Hotel Oro Verde, Guayaquil, Ecuador	18	
2023	Éffora Consoli	Brazil	Concha Acústica, Parque Samanes, Guayaquil, Ecuador	20	
2024	Christine Carbo	Ecuador	Triax Televisión, Lima, Peru	19	
2025	Saskia Lincoln	United Kingdom	Hotel Casa Andina, Chiclayo, Peru	21	

^{1}Judging of the competition took place outside of the normal pageant environment due to the global restrictions on public events and international travel imposed by the COVID-19 pandemic. The winner was crowned in a live-streamed event.

Winners gallery

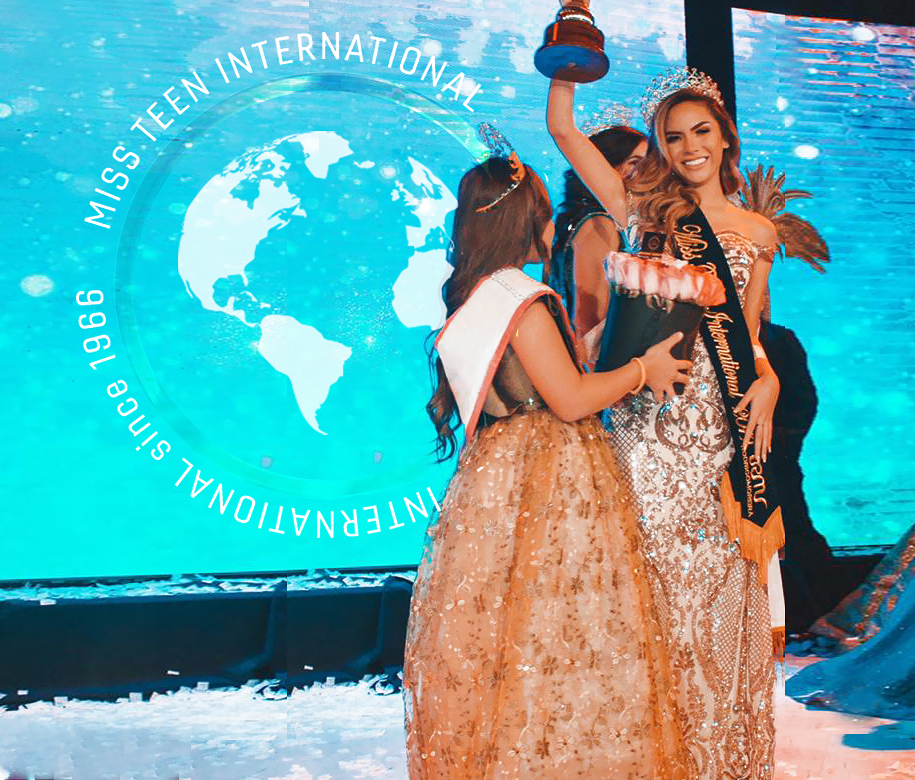
2019
Luciana Begazo
Peru

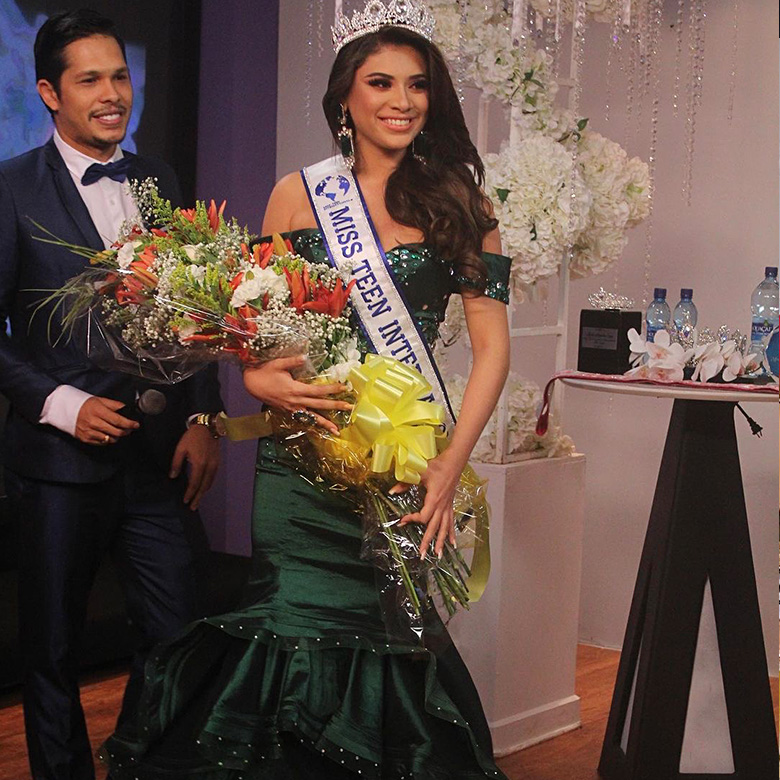
2020
Maria Alejandra Royo
Panama

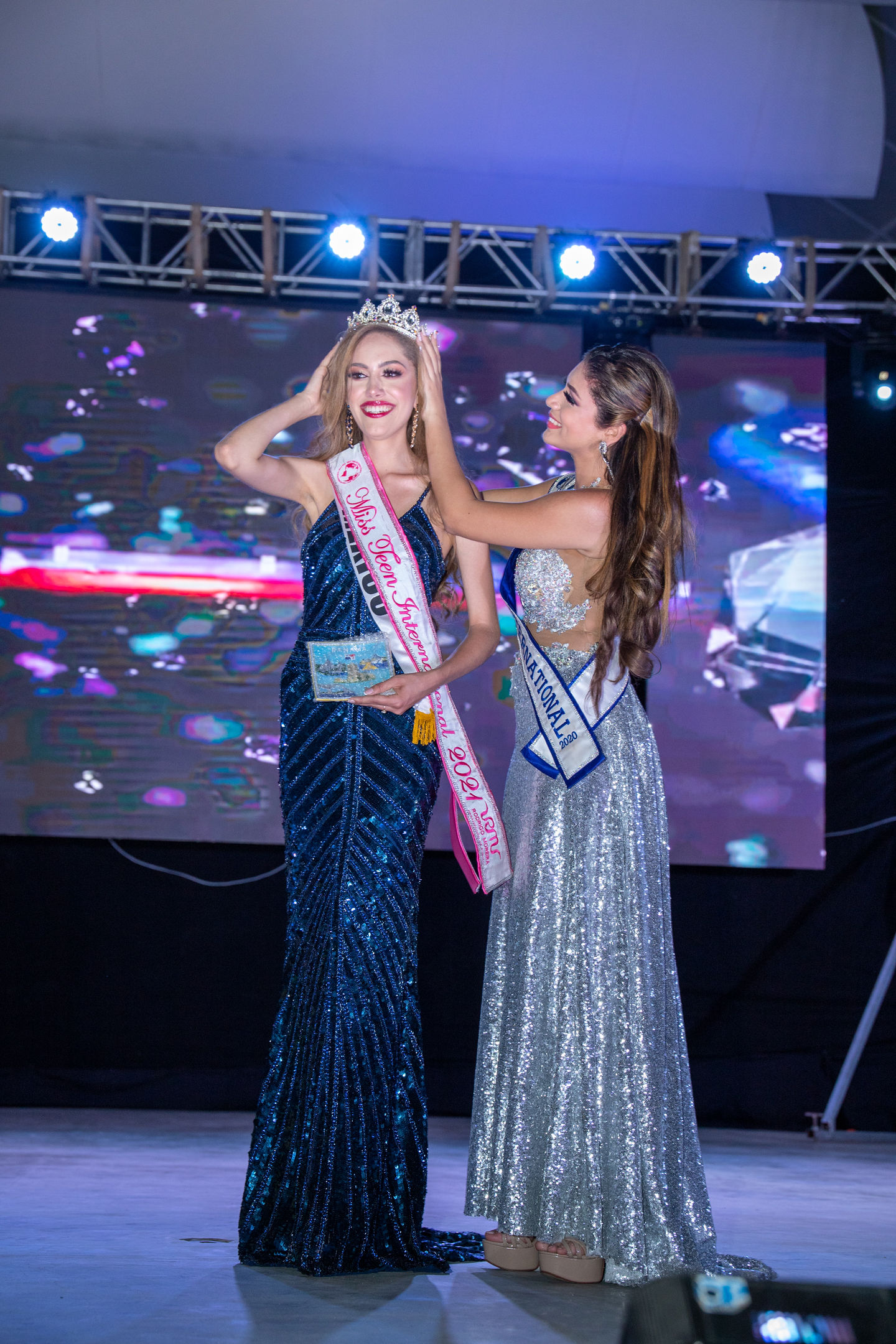
2021
Aurora Villalobos
Mexico

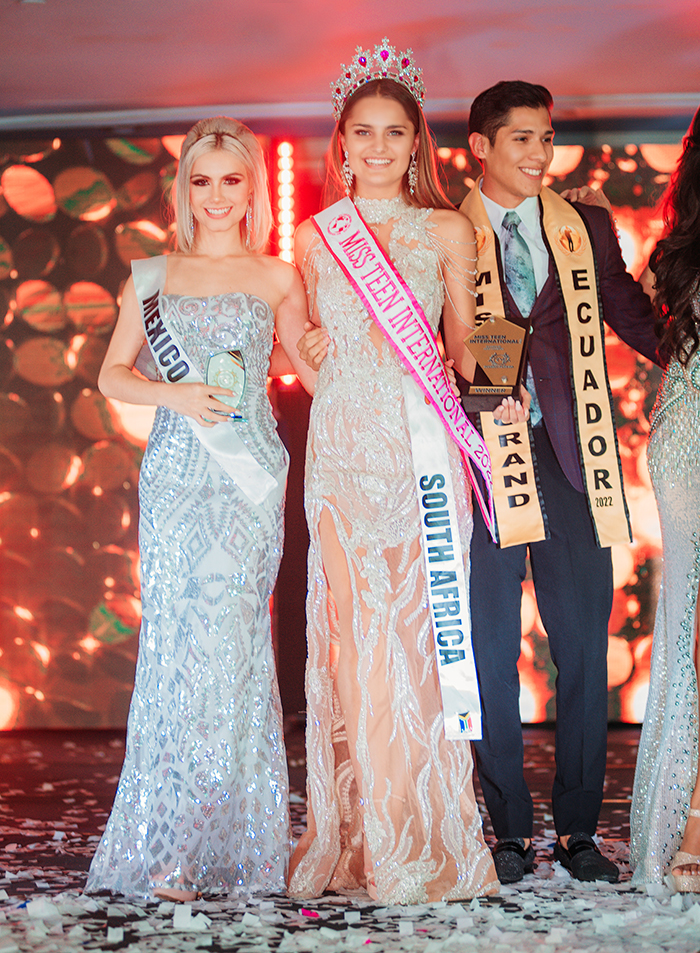
2022
Yulienke Jacobs
South Africa

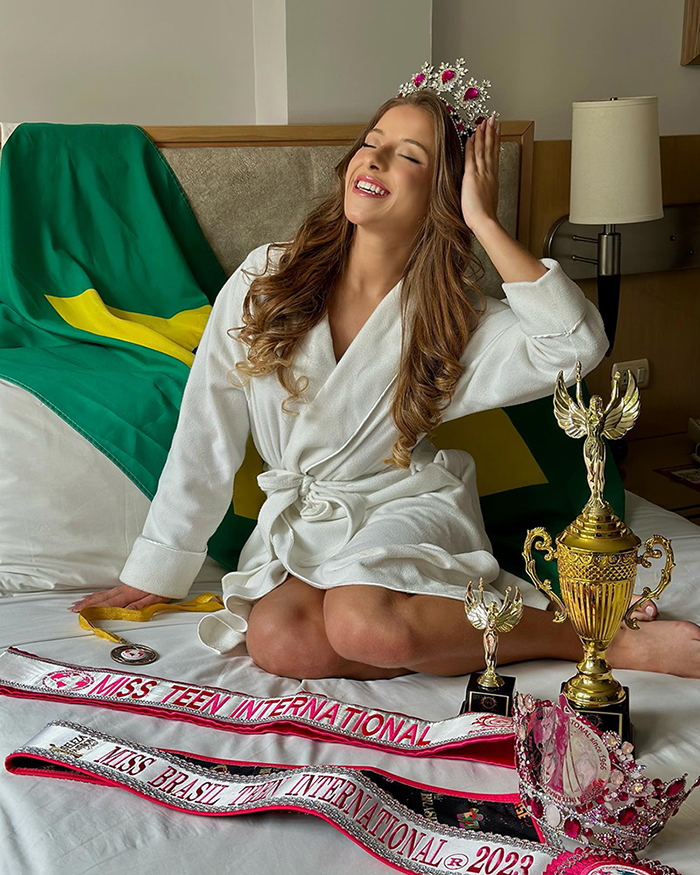
2023
Éffora Consoli
Brazil

== Countries/Territories by winning number ==
Nation	Titles	Year(s)
Brazil	7	1994, 1996, 1998, 2008, 2013, 2018, 2023
Puerto Rico	6	1997, 2001, 2006, 2012, 2015, 2017
Costa Rica	3	2002, 2003, 2009
Sweden	3	1966, 1993, 1995
Ecuador	2	2016, 2024
Mexico	2	2007, 2021
Aruba	2	1999, 2010
Australia	2	1968, 2004
United Kingdom	1	2025
South Africa	1	2022
Panama	1	2020
Peru	1	2019
Paraguay	1	2014
Nicaragua	1	2011
Curacao	1	2000
England	1	1969
Norway	1	1967

== See also ==
- Miss Teen Earth
- Miss Teen World
