= Rodrigo Moreira (director) =

Ecuadorian model

- Born: Rodrigo Moreira; June 19, 1983 (age 43); Milagro, Ecuador
- Occupations: CEO Founder & President of Miss Teen Earth (2012–present); CEO President & Producer of Miss Teen World (2012–present); CEO President & Producer of Miss Teen Intercontinental (2012–present); CEO President of Miss Teen International (2014–present); CEO & Founder of Miss Teen Supranational (2018–present); CEO President & Producer of Miss Teenager World (2014–present); CEO President & Director of Miss Teen Ecuador (2012–present)
- Height: 1.85 m (6 ft 1 in)
- Beauty pageant titleholder
- Hair color: Black
- Eye color: Brown
- Major competition: Mr. America Latina 2009 (Winner)
- Website: Official Site

Rodrigo Moreira (born June 19, 1983, in Milagro, Ecuador), is an Ecuadorian model, actor and beauty pageant titleholder who won Mr. America Latina 2009 in Lima, Peru. He is currently a beauty pageant director and producer.

== Early life ==
Rodrigo started his career as model at the age of 16 at CN Modelos Guayaquil of Cecilia Niemes.

== Pageantry ==
Moreira who is 6 ft 1 in (1.85 m) tall, represented Ecuador in the 2006 Mister Continents of the World pageant and competed in the Mister America Latina (Mister Latin America) pageant, in July 2009 and obtained the title beating sixteen contestants who took part in the competition. In addition he did win the Mr. Photogenic award.

== Beauty contests ==
In May 2012, Rodrigo organized Miss Teen Intercontinental, its first international contest, that same year he became founder of the Miss Teen Earth pageant to promote tourism of Ecuador and acquired beauty pageants which belonged to the Queen of Ecuador company.

As Director has been responsible for preparing and sending delegates from Ecuador to international contests, his most successful delegatee so far is Daniela Cepeda who won the Miss Teen Earth title and two years later was crowned Miss Ecuador, representing Ecuador in Miss Universe 2017 held at Planet Hollywood in Las Vegas, Nevada, USA.

== See also ==
- Luciana Begazo
